= Turkey in the Eurovision Song Contest 2008 =

- Eurovision Song Contest 2008
- Participating broadcaster: Türkiye Radyo ve Televizyon Kurumu (TRT)
- Country: Turkey
- Selection process: Internal selection
- Announcement date: Artist: 17 December 2007; Song: 15 February 2008

Competing entry
- Song: "Deli"
- Artist: Mor ve Ötesi
- Songwriters: Kerem Özyeğen; Burak Güven; Kerem Kabadayı; Harun Tekin

Placement
- Semi-final result: Qualified (7th, 85 points)
- Final result: 7th, 138 points

Participation chronology

Turkey was represented at the Eurovision Song Contest 2008 with the song "Deli", written by Kerem Özyeğen, Burak Güven, Kerem Kabadayı, and Harun Tekin, and performed by Mor ve Ötesi. The Turkish participating broadcaster, Türkiye Radyo ve Televizyon Kurumu (TRT), internally selected its entry for the contest.

== Before Eurovision ==
=== Internal selection ===
On 17 December 2007, TRT announced during a press conference that it had internally selected the band Mor ve Ötesi to represent Turkey in the Eurovision Song Contest 2008. The selection was decided from five shortlisted artists, among them being singer Tarkan. Three songs were submitted by the band to the broadcaster in January 2008 and a nine-member selection committee consisting of Muhsin Mete (TRT deputy general manager), Deniz Çakmakoğlu (TRT deputy head of music), Kürşat Özkök (Ankara Television manager), Ümran Sönmezer (TRT polyphonic music director), Neşet Ruacan (conductor at the TRT Istanbul Light Music and Jazz Orchestra), Kamil Özler (member of the TRT Istanbul Light Music and Jazz Orchestra), Can Sertoğlu (manager of Mor ve Ötesi), and two members of the band Harun Tekin and Kerem Özyeğen selected "Deli" as the song they would perform at the contest.

On 15 February 2008, "Deli" was presented to the public during the TRT 1 evening news bulletin. A press conference later took place at the TRT Tepebaşı Studios in Istanbul, broadcast on TRT 1 as well as online via the broadcaster's official website trt.net.tr. Mor ve Ötesi performed the song both playback and live as well as performing a mini concert during the press conference. The song was written by members of the band Kerem Özyeğen, Burak Güven, Kerem Kabadayı, and Harun Tekin.

== At Eurovision ==
Although Turkey had been granted a spot in the 2008 final because of its fourth-place finish at the Eurovision Song Contest 2007, it had to compete in a semi-final because of new rules put into effect by the European Broadcasting Union (EBU). In previous years, countries that received a top 10 placing were automatically granted a spot in the next year's final without having to compete in a semi-final, but for 2008, the EBU changed the automatic qualification regulations so that all countries except the "Big 4" (France, Germany, Spain, and the United Kingdom) and host country, would have to pass through one of two semi-finals. The EBU split up countries with a friendly voting history into separate semi-finals, to give a better chance for other countries to win. On 28 January 2008, the EBU held a special draw which determined that Turkey would be in the second semi-final, held on 22 May 2008. performed 3rd, following Sweden and preceding Ukraine. Turkey qualified to the final, placing 7th in the semi-final and scoring 85 points.

In the final they performed 12th following Iceland and preceding Portugal. They finished 7th with 138 points (including a maximum 12 from Azerbaijan).

Commentary on TRT was provided by Bülend Özveren and their spokesperson was Meltem Ersan Yazgan.

=== Voting ===
==== Points awarded to Turkey ====
Points awarded to Turkey (Semi-final 2)
Score	Country
12 points	Albania
10 points	France; United Kingdom
8 points	Denmark; Macedonia
7 points	Bulgaria; Switzerland
6 points	Sweden
5 points	Georgia; Ukraine
4 points	Hungary
3 points	Belarus
2 points	
1 point	

Points awarded to Turkey (Final)
Score	Country
12 points	Azerbaijan
10 points	Albania; Belgium; France; Germany; Netherlands
8 points	Bosnia and Herzegovina; Romania; United Kingdom
7 points	Macedonia
6 points	Georgia; Switzerland
5 points	Bulgaria; Hungary
4 points	Denmark; Finland; San Marino; Ukraine
3 points	Belarus
2 points	Norway; Russia
1 point	

==== Points awarded by Turkey ====
Points awarded by Turkey (Semi-final 2)
Score	Country
12 points	Ukraine
10 points	Georgia
8 points	Albania
7 points	Macedonia
6 points	Bulgaria
5 points	Croatia
4 points	Cyprus
3 points	Iceland
2 points	Sweden
1 point	Czech Republic

Points awarded by Turkey (Final)
Score	Country
12 points	Azerbaijan
10 points	Armenia
8 points	Ukraine
7 points	Greece
6 points	Bosnia and Herzegovina
5 points	Russia
4 points	Georgia
3 points	Spain
2 points	Norway
1 point	Albania
