= Büyük Düşler =

Studio album by Mor ve Ötesi
- Released: 9 May 2006
- Genre: Alternative rock
- Length: 51:25
- Label: Rakun
- Producer: Tarkan Gözübüyük

Mor ve Ötesi chronology
Dünya Yalan Söylüyor (2004)	Büyük Düşler (2006)	Başıbozuk (2008)

Büyük Düşler (Great Dreams) is the fifth studio album by Turkish alternative rock band Mor ve Ötesi. It was released on 9 May 2006. This is an album mainly dealing with the political problems of Turkey and the personal problems of the group members, including loss of family members and relationships. It has a darker tone than their previous albums. The first video was for the song "Şirket" (Corporation), a song criticising capitalism. The second single was chosen as "Küçük Sevgilim" (My Little Darling), and its video was directed by Ketche. Their next single was 'Ayıp Olmaz Mı?'.

== Track listing ==
1. Parti - 3:26
2. Kördüğüm - 4:50
3. Ayıp Olmaz Mı? - 4:48
4. Şirket - 3:32
5. Küçük Sevgilim - 4:14
6. Durma Öyle - 3:41
7. Kış Geliyor - 4:23
8. Darbe - 3:33
9. Saklama - 4:54
10. Sonu Belli - 4:03
11. Çocuklar ve Hayvanlar - 4:48
12. Büyük Düşler - 5:13

== Credits ==
- Harun Tekin (vocals and rhythm guitar)
- Kerem Kabadayı (drums)
- Burak Güven (bass, back vocals, lead vocals on "Sonu Belli")
- Kerem Özyeğen (lead guitar, back vocals)
- Ozan Tügen (keyboard, strings, bağlama, back vocals on "Darbe")
- Şebnem Ferah (guest vocals on "Küçük Sevgilim")
- Evren Göknar (mastering)
