= Latvia in the Eurovision Song Contest 2008 =

- Eurovision Song Contest 2008
- Participating broadcaster: Latvijas Televīzija (LTV)
- Country: Latvia
- Selection process: Eirodziesma 2008
- Selection date: 1 March 2008

Competing entry
- Song: "Wolves of the Sea"
- Artist: Pirates of the Sea
- Songwriters: Jonas Liberg; Johan Sahlen; Claes Andreasson; Torbjörn Wassenius

Placement
- Semi-final result: Qualified (6th, 86 points)
- Final result: 12th, 83 points

Participation chronology

Latvia was represented at the Eurovision Song Contest 2008 with the song "Wolves of the Sea", written by Jonas Liberg, Torbjörn Wassenius, Johan Sahlen, and Claes Andreasson, and performed by the group Pirates of the Sea. The Latvian participating broadcaster, Latvijas Televīzija (LTV), organised the national final Eirodziesma 2008 in order to select its entry for the contest. Twenty songs were selected to compete in the national final, which consisted of three shows: two semi-finals and a final. In the semi-finals on 2 and 9 February 2008, five entries were selected to advance from each show: three entries selected based on a public televote and two entries selected by an eight-member jury panel. Ten songs ultimately qualified to compete in the final on 1 March 2008 where two rounds of public voting selected "Wolves of the Sea" performed by Pirates of the Sea as the winner.

Latvia was drawn to compete in the second semi-final of the Eurovision Song Contest which took place on 22 May 2008. Performing during the show in position 10, "Wolves of the Sea" was announced among the 10 qualifying entries of the second semi-final and therefore qualified to compete in the final on 24 May. It was later revealed that Latvia placed sixth out of the 19 participating countries in the semi-final with 86 points. In the final, Latvia performed in position 14 and placed twelfth out of the 25 participating countries, scoring 83 points.

== Background ==
Prior to the 2008 contest, Latvijas Televīzija (LTV) had participated in the Eurovision Song Contest representing Latvia eight times since its first entry in 2000. It won the contest once in 2002 with the song "I Wanna" performed by Marie N. Following the introduction of semi-finals for 2004, Latvia was able to qualify to compete in the final between 2005 and 2007 including with its 2007 entry "Questa notte" performed by Bonaparti.lv.

As part of its duties as participating broadcaster, LTV organises the selection of its entry in the Eurovision Song Contest and broadcasts the event in the country. The broadcaster confirmed its intentions to participate at the 2008 contest on 23 May 2007. LTV has selected its entries for the Eurovision Song Contest through a national final. Since its debut in 2000, it had organised the selection show Eirodziesma. On 2 October 2007, the broadcaster announced that they would organise Eirodziesma 2008 in order to select its entry for the 2008 contest.

== Before Eurovision ==
=== Eirodziesma 2008 ===
Eirodziesma 2008 was the ninth edition of Eirodziesma, the music competition organised by LTV to select its entries for the Eurovision Song Contest. The competition commenced on 2 February 2008 and concluded with a final on 1 March 2008. All shows in the competition were hosted by Uģis Joksts and Kristīne Virsnīte and broadcast on LTV1 as well as online via the website apollo.lv.

==== Format ====
The format of the competition consisted of three shows: two semi-finals and a final. The two semi-finals, held on 2 and 9 February 2008, each featured ten competing entries from which five advanced to the final from each show. The final, held on 1 March 2008, selected the Latvian entry for Belgrade from the remaining ten entries over two rounds of voting: the first round selected the top three songs and the second round (superfinal) selected the winner. Results during the semi-final shows were determined by a jury panel and votes from the public. The songs first faced a public vote where the top three entries qualified. The jury then selected an additional two qualifiers from the remaining entries to proceed in the competition. In the final, a public vote exclusively determined which entry would be the winner. Viewers were able to vote via telephone or SMS.

==== Competing entries ====
Artists and songwriters were able to submit their entries to the broadcaster between 2 October 2007 and 19 November 2007. 88 entries were submitted at the conclusion of the submission period. A jury panel appointed by LTV evaluated the submitted songs and selected twenty entries for the competition. The jury panel consisted of Sopho Khalvashi (who represented Georgia in 2007), 4Fun (who represented Lithuania in 2007), Christer Björkman (Head of Delegation for Sweden at the Eurovision Song Contest and supervisor of Melodifestivalen), Adam Klein (British music manager), Bonaparti.lv (who represented Latvia in 2007), and Kaspars Zavileiskis (music expert and editor at FHM). The twenty competing artists and songs were announced during a press conference on 11 December 2007. Among the artists were Andris Ērglis and Roberto Meloni (member of Pirates of the Sea) who both represented Latvia in 2007 as part of Bonaparti.lv. It was later revealed that "Wolves of the Sea" had originally been written in Swedish for the 2007 edition of Melodifestivalen, titled "Här mellan himmel och jord" and to be performed by the group Drängarna; however the song was subsequently translated to English for Eirodziesma after being rejected from the former competition.

Artist	Song	Songwriter(s)
Aisha	"You Really Got Me Going"	Kjell Jennstig, Leif Goldkuhl
Andris Ērglis	"Broken Lullaby"	Jānis Strazds, Guntars Račs
Borowa MC feat. Kips	"The One"	Aigars Runčis, Ingars Gusans
Camillas and Vice Almana	"Mr. Weatherman"	Romans Falkenšteins, Liva Rutka
Dace Planare	"One Last Touch"	Mārtiņš Freimanis
Déjà vu	"I'm a Part of You"	Mārtiņš Freimanis
Elizabete Zagorska	"Take Me Home"	Elizabete Zagorska
Elli U and Miks feat. Pent-in Dreams	"All Come Together"	Danne Attlerud, Thomas Thörnholm
Funky Drivers	"Summertime"	Valters Sprūdžs
Iedomu spārni	"Put Some Love in the World"	Mikael Erlandsson
Ivetta	"Observations"	Ingars Viļums
Jānis Moisejs	"Fly to the Moon"	Kjell Jennstig
Joran and Axlina	"More Than 27"	Jöran Steinhauer
Ketta	"Lovely Dexter"	Romans Falkenšteins, Inga Sergejenko
Kristīna Zaharova feat. Julian	"Until You Find a Friend"	Jānis Zvirgzdiņš
Lily	"Download Your Dreams"	Miķelis Ļaksa
Pirates of the Sea	"Wolves of the Sea"	Jonas Liberg, Torbjörn Wassenius, Johan Sahlen, Claes Andreasson
Pīters Gārdens and Juris Vizbulis	"Memory Lane"	Knut-Øyvind Hagen, Arve Furset
Sabīne Berezina	"If I Only Knew"	Ann-Charlott Gensler
Triānas Parks	"Bye Bye"	Aivars Rakovskis, Agnese Rakovska

==== Shows ====
===== Semi-finals =====
The two semi-finals took place on 2 and 9 February 2008. The live portion of the show was held at the LTV studios in Riga where the artists awaited the results while their performances, which were filmed earlier at the Club Essential in Riga on 21 and 23 January 2008, were screened. In each semi-final ten acts competed and five entries qualified to the final. The competing entries first faced a public vote where the top three songs advanced; an additional two qualifiers were then selected from the remaining seven entries by the jury. The jury panel that voted in the semi-finals consisted of Ance Krauze (singer and vocal teacher), Intars Busulis (singer, trombonist and radio host), Māris Žigats (musician and DJ at Radio SWH), Aivars Hermanis (composer, arranger and producer), Gatis Gaujenieks (producer), Daina Markova (musicologist and content editor at LTV), Ilze Vītoliņa (costume designer) and members of the LTV working group.

Public vote qualifier Jury qualifier

Semi-final 1 – 2 February 2008
R/O	Artist	Song	Jury	Televote		Result
R/O	Artist	Song	Jury	Votes	Rank	Result
1	Janis Moisejs	"Fly to the Moon"	5	2,397	4	—N/a
2	Borowa MC	"The One"	10	1,714	6	—N/a
3	Joran and Axlina	"More Than 27"	7	1,994	5	—N/a
4	Ketta	"Lovely Dexter"	6	500	10	—N/a
5	Sabīne Berezina	"If I Only Knew"	1	3,765	2	Qualified
6	Funky Drivers	"Summertime"	3	923	8	Qualified
7	Pirates of the Sea	"Wolves of the Sea"	9	12,010	1	Qualified
8	Elli U and Miks feat. Pent-in Dreams	"All Come Together"	8	1,503	7	—N/a
9	Elizabete Zagorska	"Take Me Home"	4	775	9	Qualified
10	Déjà vu	"I'm a Part of You"	2	2,947	3	Qualified

Semi-final 2 – 9 February 2008
R/O	Artist	Song	Jury	Televote		Result
R/O	Artist	Song	Jury	Votes	Rank	Result
1	Aisha	"You Really Got Me Going"	2	1,751	4	Qualified
2	Dace Planare	"One Last Touch"	4	1,070	9	—N/a
3	Ivetta	"Observations"	7	1,603	6	—N/a
4	Camillas and Vice Almana	"Mr. Weatherman"	5	1,398	7	—N/a
5	Pīters Gārdens and Juris Vizbulis	"Memory Lane"	6	2,303	3	Qualified
6	Iedomu spārni	"Put Some Love in the World"	10	1,170	8	—N/a
7	Lily	"Download Your Dreams"	9	987	10	—N/a
8	Kristīna Zaharova feat. Julian	"Until You Find a Friend"	3	1,709	5	Qualified
9	Triānas Parks	"Bye Bye"	8	3,387	2	Qualified
10	Andris Ērglis	"Broken Lullaby"	1	7,256	1	Qualified

==== Final ====
The final took place at the Olympic Center in Ventspils on 1 March 2008. The ten entries that qualified from the preceding two semi-finals competed and the winner was selected over two rounds of public televoting. In the first round, the top three songs advanced to the second round, the superfinal. In the superfinal, "Wolves of the Sea" performed by Pirates of the Sea was declared the winner. In addition to the performances of the competing entries, guest performers included Bonaparti.lv (who represented Latvia in 2007), Elnur and Samir (who would represent Azerbaijan in 2008), Tereza Kerndlová (who would represent the Czech Republic in 2008), Jeronimas Milius (who would represent Lithuania in 2008), and Morena (who would represent Malta in 2008).

Final – 1 March 2008
R/O	Artist	Song	Televote	Place
1	Déjà vu	"I'm a Part of You"	1,485	7
2	Kristīna Zaharova feat. Julian	"Until You Find a Friend"	862	9
3	Sabīne Berezina	"If I Only Knew"	5,142	5
4	Pirates of the Sea	"Wolves of the Sea"	16,818	1
5	Pīters Gārdens and Juris Vizbulis	"Memory Lane"	1,932	6
6	Funky Drivers	"Summertime"	1,245	8
7	Triānas Parks	"Bye Bye"	5,656	4
8	Elizabete Zagorska	"Take Me Home"	599	10
9	Aisha	"You Really Got Me Going"	8,021	3
10	Andris Ērglis	"Broken Lullaby"	10,751	2

Superfinal – 1 March 2008
R/O	Artist	Song	Televote	Place
1	Pirates of the Sea	"Wolves of the Sea"	29,228	1
2	Aisha	"You Really Got Me Going"	22,721	2
3	Andris Ērglis	"Broken Lullaby"	21,580	3

== At Eurovision ==
It was announced in September 2007 that the competition's format would be expanded to two semi-finals in 2008. According to Eurovision rules, all nations with the exceptions of the host country and the "Big Four" (France, Germany, Spain, and the United Kingdom) are required to qualify from one of two semi-finals in order to compete for the final; the top nine songs from each semi-final as determined by televoting progress to the final, and a tenth was determined by back-up juries. The European Broadcasting Union (EBU) split up the competing countries into six different pots based on voting patterns from previous contests, with countries with favourable voting histories put into the same pot. On 28 January 2008, a special allocation draw was held which placed each country into one of the two semi-finals. Latvia was placed into the second semi-final, to be held on 22 May 2008. The running order for the semi-finals was decided through another draw on 17 March 2008 and Latvia was set to perform in position 10, following the entry from Belarus and before the entry from Croatia.

The two semi-finals and the final were broadcast in Latvia on LTV1 with all shows featuring commentary by Kārlis Streips. LTV appointed Kristīne Virsnīte as its spokesperson to announced the Latvian votes during the final.

=== Semi-final ===
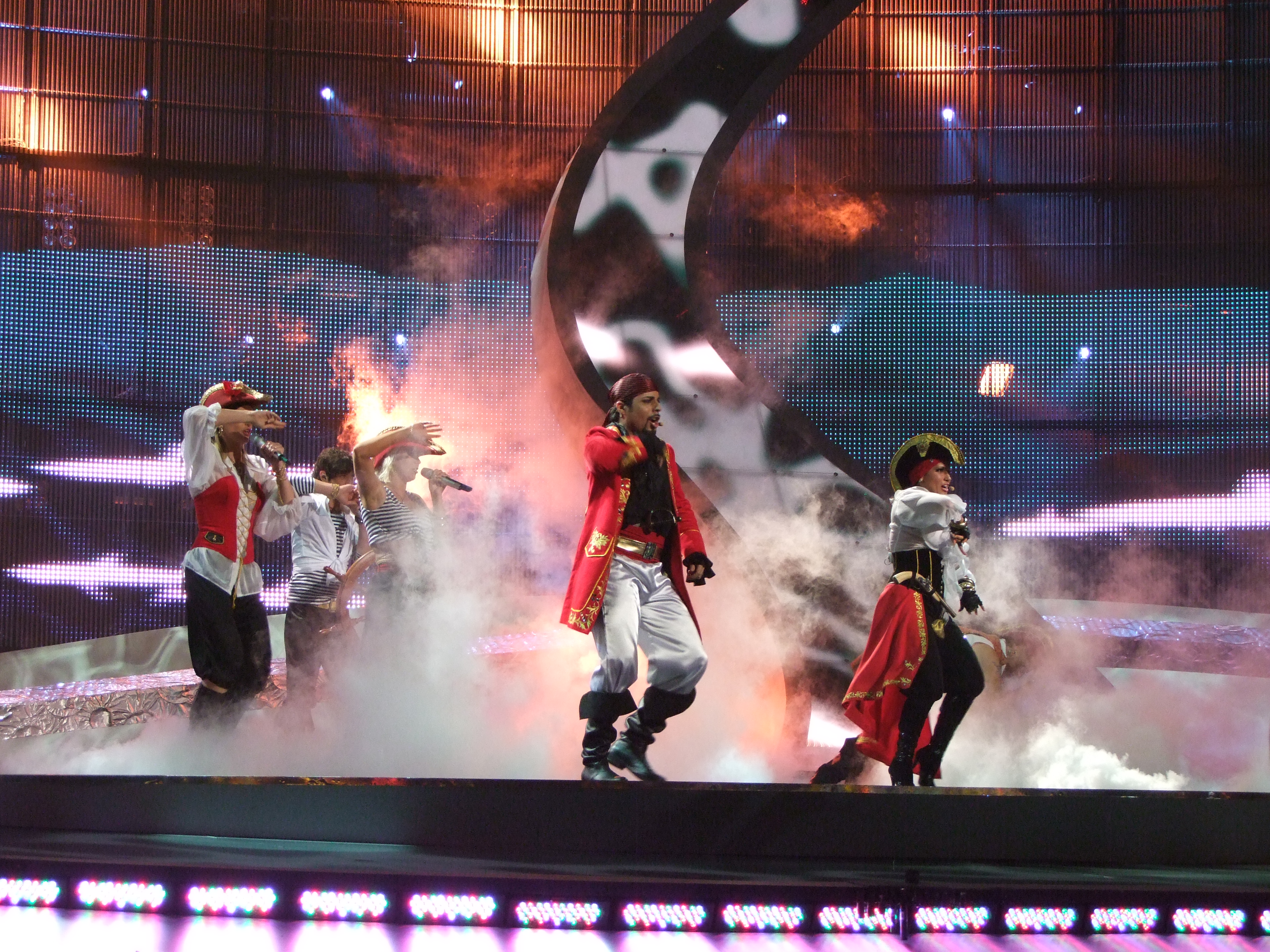
Pirates of the Sea during a rehearsal before the second semi-final

Pirates of the Sea took part in technical rehearsals on 14 and 17 May, followed by dress rehearsals on 21 and 22 May. The Latvian performance featured the members of Pirates of the Sea wearing pirate outfits and joined on stage by three backing vocalists. Several props were used for the performance which included antique weapons and swords, skull and cross bones flags, a telescope that created a small display effect showing what was seen on the top right side of the screen when used by one of the performers, and a ship steering wheel. The LED screens displayed large sharks swimming around. The backing vocalists that joined Pirates of the Sea were: Liene Candy, Oskars Zaļkalniņš and Zane Biķe-Slišāne.

At the end of the show, Latvia was announced as having finished in the top 10 and subsequently qualifying for the grand final. It was later revealed that Latvia placed sixth in the semi-final, receiving a total of 86 points.

=== Final ===
Shortly after the second semi-final, a winners' press conference was held for the ten qualifying countries. As part of this press conference, the qualifying artists took part in a draw to determine the running order of the final. This draw was done in the order the countries appeared in the semi-final running order. Latvia was drawn to perform in position 14, following the entry from Portugal and before the entry from Sweden.

Pirates of the Sea once again took part in dress rehearsals on 23 and 24 May before the final. The group performed a repeat of their semi-final performance during the final on 24 May. At the conclusion of the voting, Latvia finished in twelfth place with 83 points.

=== Voting ===
Below is a breakdown of points awarded to Latvia and awarded by Latvia in the second semi-final and grand final of the contest. The nation awarded its 12 points to Lithuania in the semi-final and to Russia in the final of the contest.

==== Points awarded to Latvia ====
Points awarded to Latvia (Semi-final 2)
Score	Country
12 points	Lithuania
10 points	Portugal
8 points	Sweden
7 points	Iceland
6 points	Belarus; Croatia; Denmark; Georgia; Malta
5 points	Czech Republic; United Kingdom
4 points	Macedonia
3 points	
2 points	Serbia; Ukraine
1 point	Bulgaria

Points awarded to Latvia (Final)
Score	Country
12 points	Ireland
10 points	Lithuania; United Kingdom
8 points	Portugal
7 points	Estonia; Malta
6 points	Denmark
5 points	
4 points	Croatia; Iceland
3 points	Czech Republic; Montenegro; Sweden
2 points	Andorra; Georgia; Spain
1 point	

==== Points awarded by Latvia ====
Points awarded by Latvia (Semi-final 2)
Score	Country
12 points	Lithuania
10 points	Georgia
8 points	Denmark
7 points	Croatia
6 points	Ukraine
5 points	Belarus
4 points	Malta
3 points	Portugal
2 points	Iceland
1 point	Bulgaria

Points awarded by Latvia (Final)
Score	Country
12 points	Russia
10 points	Ukraine
8 points	Georgia
7 points	Denmark
6 points	Norway
5 points	Croatia
4 points	Azerbaijan
3 points	France
2 points	Iceland
1 point	Finland

== After Eurovision ==
Following the contest, "Wolves of the Sea" went on to have minor success in European music charts, peaking at number 40 in Denmark's Hitlisten. The song was subsequently covered by Scottish folk metal band Alestorm and included on their 2009 album Black Sails at Midnight, and in Afrikaans by South African singer Willem Botha as "Hi Hi Ho", which has also been used as a chant by fans of the South Africa national rugby union team, the Springboks, during team matches.
