= Harun Tekin =

Harun Tekin may refer to:

- Harun Tekin (footballer) (born 1989), Turkish professional footballer
- Harun Tekin (musician) (born 1977), Turkish singer, musician, and poet
