= Bulgaria in the Eurovision Song Contest 2008 =

- Eurovision Song Contest 2008
- Participating broadcaster: Bulgarian National Television (BNT)
- Country: Bulgaria
- Selection process: Bŭlgarskata pesen v „Evroviziya 2008”
- Selection date: 23 February 2008

Competing entry
- Song: "DJ, Take Me Away"
- Artist: Deep Zone and Balthazar
- Songwriters: Dian Savov

Placement
- Semi-final result: Failed to qualify (11th)

Participation chronology

Bulgaria was represented at the Eurovision Song Contest 2008 with the song "DJ, Take Me Away", written by Dian Savov, and performed by the group Deep Zone and Balthazar. The Bulgarian participating broadcaster, Bulgarian National Television (BNT), organised the national final Bŭlgarskata pesen v „Evroviziya 2008” in order to select its entry for the contest. 56 entries were selected to participate in the first phase of the national final, EuroBGvision, which consisted of three monthly selections. Fourteen entries qualified to compete in Bŭlgarskata pesen v „Evroviziya 2008” which consisted of two shows: a semi-final and a final held on 26 January 2008 and 23 February 2008, respectively. Eighteen entries competed in the semi-final and the top nine songs qualified to the final alongside three pre-qualified songs. In the final, public televoting exclusively selected "DJ, Take Me Away" performed by Deep Zone and Balthazar as the winning entry with 15.37% of the votes.

Bulgaria was drawn to compete in the second semi-final of the Eurovision Song Contest which took place on 22 May 2008. Performing during the show in position 12, "DJ, Take Me Away" was not announced among the 10 qualifying entries of the second semi-final and therefore did not qualify to compete in the final. It was later revealed that Bulgaria placed eleventh out of the 19 participating countries in the semi-final with 56 points.

== Background ==
Prior to the 2008 contest, Bulgarian National Television (BNT) had participated in the Eurovision Song Contest representing Bulgaria three times since its first entry in 2005. It achieved its best result in 2007 with the song "Water" performed by Elitsa Todorova and Stoyan Yankoulov, which qualified to the final and placed fifth. To this point, their 2007 entry is also the only Bulgarian entry to have qualified to the Eurovision final; they had failed to qualify to the final with their other two entries.

As part of its duties as participating broadcaster, BNT organises the selection of its entry in the Eurovision Song Contest and broadcasts the event in the country. The broadcaster confirmed its participation in the 2008 contest on 29 June 2007. Since 2005, BNT has organised a national final in order to select its entry for the competition, a selection procedure that continued for its 2008 entry.

== Before Eurovision ==
=== EuroBGvision ===
EuroBGvision was the first phase of the national final format developed by BNT which determined the artist and song that would represent Bulgaria at the Eurovision Song Contest 2008. The competition consisted of three monthly selections on 26 October 2007, 23 November 2007 and 21 December 2007, held at the National Palace of Culture in Sofia. All shows were hosted by Dragomir Draganov, Aksinia Chenkova, Dani Georgiev and Niki Iliev and broadcast on Channel 1 as well as online via the broadcaster's website bnt.bg.

==== Competing entries ====
On 29 June 2007, BNT opened a submission period for artists and songwriters to submit their entries until 26 September 2007. Songs were required to contain partial Bulgarian involvement. By the end of the deadline, the broadcaster received 56 eligible entries out of 79 submitted, which were announced on 27 September 2007. The 56 entries were allocated to one of the three monthly selections and the entries competing in each selection were presented over three weekly shows: 7, 14 and 21 October 2007 for the October selection, 4, 11 and 18 November 2007 for the November selection, and 2, 9, and 16 December 2007 for the December selection.

| Artist | Song | Songwriter(s) |
|---|---|---|
| Angels | "Memory" | Silvia Georgieva, Dob Antonov |
| Big Mama Scandal | "Come With Me" | Ivaylo Gochev |
| Begacha | "Ne vyarvay" (Не вярвай) | Begacha |
| Black Rose | "Malki chudesa" (Малки чудеса) | Black Rose |
| Bobi Kokera and Bleki | "Tezhka vecher" (Тежка вечер) | Boris Vaklinov |
| Dani Milev | "Svetlinata i mraka" (Светлината и мрака) | Dani Milev |
| Deep Zone and Balthazar | "DJ, Take Me Away" | Dian Savov |
| Dennis | "Confession" | Krasimir Iliev, Rositsa Bliznakova |
| Di-Do | "Full of Love" | Alex Nushev, Alexander Kiprov |
| Dimitar Atanasov | "Koj sŭm az" (Кой съм аз) | Dimitar Atanasov, Shterion Urumov |
| Dobromir Peev | "Libe" (Либе) | Dobromir Peev |
| Elektrika | "Like I Do" | Nikola Petrov, Temi Dimitrova |
| Generation | "Running Scared" | Generation, Phil Jackson, Dimitar Trendafilov |
| Gergana Koeva | "Nyakoy den" (Някой ден) | Alex Nushev, Ann-G |
| Guava Jelly | "Smelly King-Size Bed" | Erol Ibrahimov |
| Hristina Pipova | "Kalino mome!" (Калино моме!) | Ivo Naumov, Hristina Pipova |
| Hristo Todorov | "Ostani" (Остани) | Hristo Todorov, Polya Poncheva-Nikolova |
| Iliyana Yordanova | "Unischozhavascha lyubov" (Унисчожавасча любов) | Iliyana Yordanova |
| Instinkt | "Vei, povei" (Веи, повей) | Dimitar Kostanzaliev, Boyka Dragomiretskaya |
| Intsident | "Byagstva" (Бягства) | Intsident, Diana Atanasova |
| Ivan and Stani | "You Are Magic" | Paul Abela, Joe Julian Farrugia |
| Ivelina Kolaksuzova and Popcorn | "Dance with Me" | Ivelina Kolaksuzova |
| Katina | "Almost Perfect" | Nasko Lyapchev |
| Katrin | "Tseluni noshtta" (Целуни нощта) | Ekaterina Mladenova |
| Konkurent | "Edin zhivot" (Един живот) | Emil Anchev |
| Krasimira Slavova | "Iskam tvoite usmivki" (Искам твоите усмивки) | Petar Pisarski |
| Kristina Georgieva | "Don't Leave Me" | Kristina Georgieva |
| Lora Vladova | "Dosega" (Досега) | Svetozar Hristov, Lora Vladova |
| Lora Vladova | "Sweet Love" | Svetlin Kaslev, Georgi Enchev |
| Lorado | "Paradoks remiks" (Парадокс ремикс) | Krasimir Krastev, Lorado |
| Margarita Hranova | "Ne me boli" (Не ме боли) | Deyan Nedelchev, Emil Dilchev |
| Mario Denev | "Vyarvam" (Вярвам) | Alexander Ribitsov, Nadezhda Zakharieva |
| Mariyana | "Moonlight" | Mariyana Zhekova, Bob Katsionis |
| Misha Iliev | "Nai-krasivoto litse" (Най-красивото лице) | Andro Stubel |
| Monika Goranova | "Ot zvezdite" (От звездите) | Atanas Atanasov, Strahilka Petrova |
| Monika Kirovska | "Bring Me Back My Freedom" | Tsvetan Vlaykov |
| Motel | "Chocolate Girl" | Ivan Terziev, Yasen Hadzhikolev |
| Nadezhda Manova | "The Sweetest Kiss" | Sabin Yordanov |
| Nikolay Manolov | "Po-dobre" (По-добре) | Krasimir Polmezov, Yavor Kirin |
| Nikolay Mihailov | "Vŭzdukh i voda" (Въздух и вода) | Nikolay Mihailov |
| Pavel Mihov | "Zabraven plazh" (Забравен плаж) | Dobrin Vekilov-Doni |
| Reni, Vili and Vesi | "Zvezdi" (Звезди) | Yevgeny Platov, Romanola Miroslavova |
| Simona Sivanio | "Obeschay mi" (Обещай ми) | Alexander Mikhailov |
| Sky | "Samo teb obicham" (Само теб обичам) | Vasil Vasilev, Ivaylo Georgiev |
| Stoyan Chingov | "Zvezden mig" (Звезден миг) | Ivan Chingov |
| Sunnie | "Do You Love Me" | Ivaylo Terziev |
| Svetozar Hristov | "Pandemonium" | Svetozar Hristov, Ventsislava Tumangelova |
| Svetozar Hristov and Magdalena Dzhanavarova | "Lonely World" | Svetozar Hristov, Ventsislava Tumangelova |
| Tatyana Velikova | "Den" (Ден) | Tatyana Velikova |
| Terry Angel | "Strannitsi v noshtta" (Странници в нощта) | Kamen Nikolov |
| Tikhomir Nikolov | "Byagam" (Бягам) | Tikhomir Nikolov, Svetlin Staykov, Rosen Dimitrov |
| Tiramisu | "Dali e znak" (Дали е знак) | Tsvetan Karabov, Hristina Tarnovska |
| Tsetso Vlaykov and Stetson | "Euro Train" | Tsvetan Vlaykov |
| Vlado and Svetlio | "Tired Soul" | Vladimir Dimov, Ventsislava Tumangelova |
| X-R@Y | "Na sŭn" (На сън) | Nikolay Dimitrov |
| Zhivko Ivanov | "Planeta bez bŭdeshte?" (Планета без бъдеще?) | Tsvetomir Kaloyanov, Zhivko Ivanov |

==== Monthly selections ====
The three monthly selections took place on 26 October, 23 November and 21 December 2007. Prior to the October selection, "Tseluni noshtta" performed by Katrin was disqualified from the competition, while Begacha and Dobromir Peev withdrew their songs. Three entries qualified to Bŭlgarskata pesen v „Evroviziya 2008” from each selection based on the results of public televoting, while an additional five entries received wildcards and qualified to Bŭlgarskata pesen v „Evroviziya 2008”.

In addition to the performances of the competing entries, Dmitry Koldun (who represented Belarus in 2007) performed as a guest in the October selection, while the StringS quartet, "Diva" Ballet Group, and Bon-Bon (who represented Bulgaria in Junior Eurovision 2007) performed as guests in the November selection, and Petya Buyuklieva and Karolina (who represented Macedonia in 2002 and 2007) performed as guests in the December selection.

Qualifier Wildcard qualifier Entry withdrawn/disqualified

October selection – 26 October 2007
| R/O | Artist | Song | Televote | Place |
|---|---|---|---|---|
| 1 | ~~Begacha~~ | ~~"Ne vyarvay"~~ | ~~0.24%~~ | ~~17~~ |
| 2 | Nikolay Manolov | "Po-dobre" | 10.87% | 3 |
| 3 | ~~Katrin~~ | ~~"Tseluni noshtta"~~ | — | — |
| 4 | Ivan and Stani | "You Are Magic" | 5.38% | 9 |
| 5 | Dennis | "Confession" | 5.74% | 4 |
| 6 | Monika Kirovska | "Bring Me Back My Freedom" | 0.67% | 16 |
| 7 | Sky | "Samo teb obicham" | 5.28% | 10 |
| 8 | Stoyan Chingov | "Zvezden mig" | 0.84% | 15 |
| 9 | Tatyana Velikova | "Den" | 2.20% | 12 |
| 10 | Tiramisu | "Dali e znak" | 5.59% | 5 |
| 11 | Monika Goranova | "Ot zvezdite" | 2.13% | 13 |
| 12 | ~~Dobromir Peev~~ | ~~"Libe"~~ | ~~0.10%~~ | ~~18~~ |
| 13 | Lora Vladova | "Dosega" | 5.11% | 11 |
| 14 | Tikhomir Nikolov | "Byagam" | 2.08% | 14 |
| 15 | Dimitar Atanasov | "Koj sŭm az" | 5.43% | 8 |
| 16 | Krasimira Slavova | "Iskam tvoite usmivki" | 5.47% | 6 |
| 17 | Instinkt | "Vei, povei" | 5.45% | 7 |
| 18 | Mariyana | "Moonlight" | 16.06% | 2 |
| 19 | Svetozar Hristov and Magdalena Dzhanavarova | "Lonely World" | 21.36% | 1 |

November selection – 23 November 2007
| R/O | Artist | Song | Televote | Place |
|---|---|---|---|---|
| 1 | X-R@Y | "Na sŭn" | 3.89% | 11 |
| 2 | Tsetso Vlaykov and Stetson | "Euro Train" | 0.91% | 19 |
| 3 | Zhivko Ivanov | "Planeta bez bŭdeshte?" | 0.79% | 20 |
| 4 | Iliyana Yordanova | "Unischozhavascha lyubov" | 4.89% | 10 |
| 5 | Reni, Vili and Vesi | "Zvezdi" | 2.39% | 13 |
| 6 | Hristo Todorov | "Ostani" | 1.58% | 15 |
| 7 | Kristina Georgieva | "Don't Leave Me" | 5.82% | 8 |
| 8 | Deep Zone and Balthazar | "DJ, Take Me Away" | 9.07% | 5 |
| 9 | Misha Iliev | "Nai-krasivoto litse" | 9.26% | 4 |
| 10 | Hristina Pipova | "Kalino mome!" | 5.23% | 9 |
| 11 | Bobi Kokera and Bleki | "Tezhka vecher" | 1.84% | 14 |
| 12 | Mario Denev | "Vyarvam" | 1.26% | 18 |
| 13 | Simona Sivanio | "Obeschay mi" | 3.72% | 12 |
| 14 | Big Mama Scandal | "Come With Me" | 1.43% | 17 |
| 15 | Vlado and Svetlio | "Tired Soul" | 13.22% | 1 |
| 16 | Motel | "Chocolate Girl" | 6.35% | 7 |
| 17 | Sunnie | "Do You Love Me" | 9.81% | 2 |
| 18 | Di-Do | "Full of Love" | 9.67% | 3 |
| 19 | Konkurent | "Edin zhivot" | 7.35% | 6 |
| 20 | Margarita Hranova | "Ne me boli" | 1.52% | 16 |

December selection – 21 December 2007
| R/O | Artist | Song | Televote | Place |
|---|---|---|---|---|
| 1 | Generation | "Running Scared" | 9.81% | 2 |
| 2 | Ivelina Kolaksuzova and Popcorn | "Dance with Me" | 12.81% | 1 |
| 3 | Intsident | "Byagstva" | 7.75% | 7 |
| 4 | Angels | "Memory" | 3.93% | 12 |
| 5 | Black Rose | "Malki chudesa" | 7.42% | 8 |
| 6 | Nikolay Mihailov | "Vŭzdukh i voda" | 2.02% | 13 |
| 7 | Guava Jelly | "Smelly King-Size Bed" | 1.01% | 15 |
| 8 | Gergana Koeva | "Nyakoy den" | 0.45% | 16 |
| 9 | Pavel Mihov | "Zabraven plazh" | 8.88% | 5 |
| 10 | Elektrika | "Like I Do" | 5.54% | 11 |
| 11 | Nadezhda Manova | "The Sweetest Kiss" | 1.61% | 14 |
| 12 | Lora Vladova | "Sweet Love" | 5.92% | 9 |
| 13 | Lorado | "Paradoks remiks" | 0.19% | 17 |
| 14 | Terry Angel | "Strannitsi v noshtta" | 5.62% | 10 |
| 15 | Dani Milev | "Svetlinata i mraka" | 7.87% | 6 |
| 16 | Katina | "Almost Perfect" | 9.44% | 4 |
| 17 | Svetozar Hristov | "Pandemonium" | 9.73% | 3 |

=== Bŭlgarskata pesen v „Evroviziya 2008” ===
Bŭlgarskata pesen v „Evroviziya 2008” (The Bulgarian song in Eurovision 2008) was the second phase of the national final format developed by BNT which determined the artist and song that would represent Bulgaria at the Eurovision Song Contest 2008. The competition consisted of a semi-final on 26 January 2008 and a final on 23 February 2008, held at the National Palace of Culture in Sofia. Both shows were broadcast on Channel 1 as well as online via the broadcaster's website bnt.bg.

==== Competing entries ====
On 1 October 2007, BNT opened a submission period for artists and songwriters to submit their entries until 21 December 2007. Songs were required to contain partial Bulgarian involvement. By the end of the deadline, the broadcaster received 44 eligible entries out of 47 submitted. On 22 December 2007, the eighteen artists and songs selected for the semi-final of the competition were announced. Fourteen of the entries were the qualifiers of EuroBGvision, while the remaining four entries were selected from the submitted songs. An additional three entries were produced by BNT and automatically qualified for the final of the competition, which were announced on 26 January 2008.

| Artist | Song | Songwriter(s) | Selection |
|---|---|---|---|
| Dani Milev | "Svetlinata i mraka" (Светлината и мрака) | Dani Milev | EuroBGvision |
| Deep Zone and Balthazar | "DJ, Take Me Away" | Dian Savov | EuroBGvision |
| Desi Dobreva | "Strong" | Desi Dobreva, Milena Dobreva | Produced by BNT |
| Di-Do | "Full of Love" | Alex Nushev, Alexander Kiprov | EuroBGvision |
| Generation | "Running Scared" | Generation, Phil Jackson, Dimitar Trendafilov | EuroBGvision |
| Georgi Hristov and Gianni Fiorellino | "Sogno" | Gianni Fiorellino | Produced by BNT |
| Ivan and Stani | "You Are Magic" | Paul Abela, Joe Julian Farrugia | EuroBGvision |
| Ivaylo Kolev | "Should've Been the One" | Daniel Betancourt, Jason Phelps | Open submission |
| Ivelina Kolaksuzova and Popcorn | "Dance with Me" | Ivelina Kolaksuzova | EuroBGvision |
| Katina | "Almost Perfect" | Nasko Lyapchev | EuroBGvision |
| Mariya Bachvarova feat. Van | "Love Is Not a Game" | Yuri Manoilov, Stamen Yanev | Open submission |
| Mariyana | "Moonlight" | Mariyana Zhekova, Bob Katsionis | EuroBGvision |
| Nevena | "Ne izchezvay" (Не изчезвай) | Miro Gechev, Vanya Shtereva, Karla Rahal | Produced by BNT |
| Nikolay Manolov | "Po-dobre" (По-добре) | Krasimir Polmezov, Yavor Kirin | EuroBGvision |
| Simona Sivanio | "Obeschay mi" (Обещай ми) | Alexander Mikhailov | EuroBGvision |
| Stoyan Royanov | "Sombero" | Stoyan Royanov | Open submission |
| Sunnie | "Do You Love Me" | Ivaylo Terziev | EuroBGvision |
| Svetozar Hristov | "Pandemonium" | Svetozar Hristov, Ventsislava Tumangelova | EuroBGvision |
| Svetozar Hristov and Magdalena Dzhanavarova | "Lonely World" | Svetozar Hristov, Ventsislava Tumangelova | EuroBGvision |
| TE and Preslava Peycheva | "Tazi vecher" (Тази вечер) | Yasen Velchev, Alexander Petrov | Open submission |
| Vlado and Svetlio | "Tired Soul" | Vladimir Dimov, Ventsislava Tumangelova | EuroBGvision |

==== Semi-final ====
The semi-final took place on 26 January 2008, hosted by Dragomir Draganov, Aksiniya Chenkova and Dani Georgiev. Nine entries qualified to the final based on the votes of a fifteen-person jury panel. In addition to the performances of the competing entries, guest performers were the three pre-qualified artists: Desi Dobreva, Georgi Hristov and Gianni Fiorellino, and Nevena. On 28 January 2008, "Sombero" performed by Stoyan Royanov which originally was selected to advance from the semi-final was disqualified from the competition after the song had been performed in June 2007; "Tired Soul" performed by Vlado and Svetlio was selected as the replacement qualifier.

Semi-final – 26 January 2008
| R/O | Artist | Song | Result |
|---|---|---|---|
| 1 | Ivaylo Kolev | "Should've Been the One" | Qualified |
| 2 | Ivelina Kolaksuzova and Popcorn | "Dance with Me" | —N/a |
| 3 | Deep Zone and Balthazar | "DJ, Take Me Away" | Qualified |
| 4 | Svetozar Hristov | "Pandemonium" | —N/a |
| 5 | Di-Do | "Full of Love" | —N/a |
| 6 | Mariya Bachvarova feat. Van | "Love Is Not a Game" | —N/a |
| 7 | Ivan and Stani | "You Are Magic" | Qualified |
| 8 | Vlado and Svetlio | "Tired Soul" | Qualified |
| 9 | TE and Preslava Peycheva | "Tazi vecher" | Qualified |
| 10 | Mariyana | "Moonlight" | —N/a |
| 11 | ~~Stoyan Royanov~~ | ~~"Sombero"~~ | Disqualified |
| 12 | Sunnie | "Do You Love Me" | —N/a |
| 13 | Simona Sivanio | "Obeschay mi" | Qualified |
| 14 | Svetozar Hristov and Magdalena Dzhanavarova | "Lonely World" | —N/a |
| 15 | Katina | "Almost Perfect" | —N/a |
| 16 | Generation | "Running Scared" | Qualified |
| 17 | Dani Milev | "Svetlinata i mraka" | Qualified |
| 18 | Nikolay Manolov | "Po-dobre" | Qualified |

==== Final ====
The final took place on 23 February 2008, hosted by Dragomir Draganov, Aksiniya Chenkova, Dani Georgiev and Niki Iliev. The nine semi-final qualifiers along alongside the three automatic qualifiers competed and "DJ, Take Me Away" performed by Deep Zone and Balthazar was selected as the winner exclusively by public televoting. In addition to the performances of the competing entries, guest performers were Lili Ivanova, Mike Johnson, Ruslana (who won Eurovision for Ukraine in 2004), and Elitsa Todorova and Stoyan Yankoulov (who represented Bulgaria in 2007).

Final – 23 February 2008
| R/O | Artist | Song | Televote | Place |
|---|---|---|---|---|
| 1 | Simona Sivanio | "Obeschay mi" | 2.33% | 11 |
| 2 | Nikolay Manolov | "Po-dobre" | 12.98% | 3 |
| 3 | Dani Milev | "Svetlinata i mraka" | 11.54% | 4 |
| 4 | Georgi Hristov and Gianni Fiorellino | "Sogno" | 15.27% | 2 |
| 5 | Nevena | "Ne izchezvay" | 9.36% | 7 |
| 6 | Ivaylo Kolev | "Should've Been the One" | 3.76% | 8 |
| 7 | ТE and Preslava Peycheva | "Tazi vecher" | 2.06% | 12 |
| 8 | Ivan and Stani | "You Are Magic" | 3.06% | 10 |
| 9 | Desi Dobreva | "Strong" | 9.60% | 6 |
| 10 | Deep Zone and Balthazar | "DJ, Take Me Away" | 15.37% | 1 |
| 11 | Vlado and Svetlio | "Tired Soul" | 11.26% | 5 |
| 12 | Generation | "Running Scared" | 3.14% | 9 |

=== Promotion ===
Deep Zone and Balthazar made several appearances across Europe to specifically promote "DJ, Take Me Away" as the Bulgarian Eurovision entry. Between 2 and 4 April, Deep Zone and Balthazar made radio and television appearances in Ukraine and performed at the Maidan Nezalezhnosti in Kyiv. On 14 April, the group appeared during the NET TV talk show programme Sellili in Malta. Between 18 and 20 April, the group took part in promotional activities in Turkey where they were interviewed by local media and appeared during shows on Mega Radio, ATV, MTV Turkey, Show TV, and TRT. On 24 April, the artists appeared during the RTP1 talk show Portugal no Coração in Portugal. Deep Zone and Balthazar also took part in promotional activities in Greece and Romania, and completed promotional activities in Croatia on 12 May. In addition to their international appearances, Deep Zone and Balthazar performed during the annual BG Radio Music Awards which was held on 6 April at the National Palace of Culture in Sofia.

== At Eurovision ==
The Eurovision Song Contest 2008 took place at the Belgrade Arena in Belgrade, Serbia. It consisted of two semi-finals held on 20 and 22 May, respectively, and the grand final on 24 May 2008. It was announced in September 2007 that the competition's format would be expanded to two semi-finals in 2008. According to Eurovision rules, all nations with the exceptions of the host country and the "Big Four" (France, Germany, Spain, and the United Kingdom) are required to qualify from one of two semi-finals in order to compete for the final; the top nine songs from each semi-final as determined by televoting progress to the final, and a tenth was determined by back-up juries. The European Broadcasting Union (EBU) split up the competing countries into six different pots based on voting patterns from previous contests, with countries with favourable voting histories put into the same pot. On 28 January 2008, a special allocation draw was held which placed each country into one of the two semi-finals. Bulgaria was placed into the second semi-final, to be held on 22 May 2008. The running order for the semi-finals was decided through another draw on 17 March 2008 and Bulgaria was set to perform in position 12, following the entry from Croatia and before the entry from Denmark.

The two semi-finals and the final were broadcast in Bulgaria on Channel 1 with commentary by Elena Rosberg and Georgi Kushvaliev. BNT appointed Valentina Voykova as its spokesperson to announce the Bulgarian votes during the final.

=== Semi-final ===
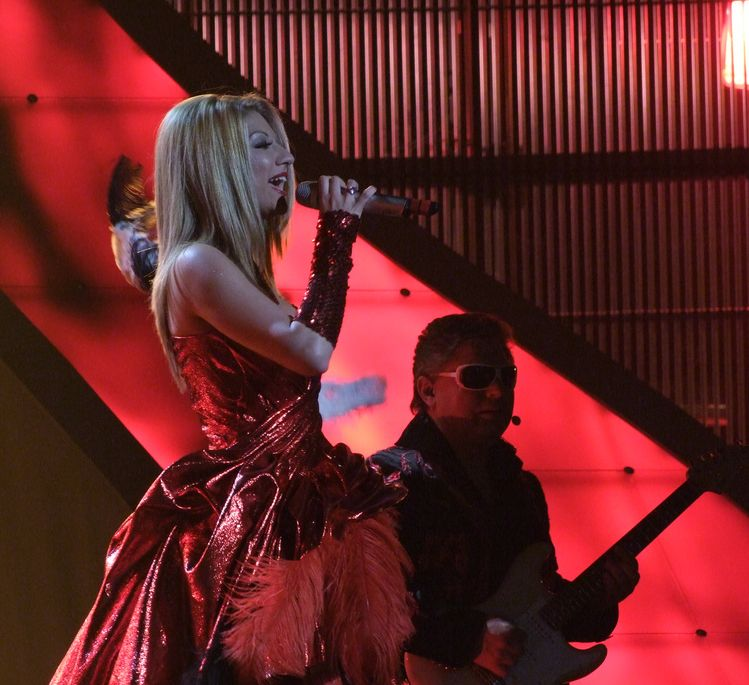
Deep Zone and Balthazar performing during the second semi-final

Deep Zone and Balthazar took part in technical rehearsals on 14 and 17 May, followed by dress rehearsals on 21 and 22 May. The Bulgarian performance featured the members of Deep Zone and Balthazar performing with guitar-shaped turntables which its disks were set alight on stage equipment cases at the end of the song. Lead singer Joanna Dragneva wore a red gown and held ostrich feathers. The other group members also performed vocals using vocoders. The stage colours were red and the LED screens displayed colourful elements. The performance also featured effects including green lasers and pyrotechnics. A breakdancer in a shirt with the number 12 joined Deep Zone and Balthazar on stage: Peter Kostov.

At the end of the show, Bulgaria was not announced among the top 10 entries in the second semi-final and therefore failed to qualify to compete in the final. It was later revealed that Bulgaria placed eleventh in the semi-final, receiving a total of 56 points.

=== Voting ===
Below is a breakdown of points awarded to Bulgaria and awarded by Bulgaria in the second semi-final and grand final of the contest. The nation awarded its 12 points to Ukraine in the semi-final and to Germany in the final of the contest.

==== Points awarded to Bulgaria ====
Points awarded to Bulgaria (Semi-final 2)
| Score | Country |
|---|---|
| 12 points | |
| 10 points | |
| 8 points | Cyprus |
| 7 points | Macedonia |
| 6 points | France; Turkey; Ukraine |
| 5 points | Iceland; Serbia |
| 4 points | |
| 3 points | Hungary |
| 2 points | Belarus; Czech Republic; Malta |
| 1 point | Croatia; Latvia; Lithuania; Portugal |

==== Points awarded by Bulgaria ====
Points awarded by Bulgaria (Semi-final 2)
| Score | Country |
|---|---|
| 12 points | Ukraine |
| 10 points | Macedonia |
| 8 points | Cyprus |
| 7 points | Turkey |
| 6 points | Croatia |
| 5 points | Portugal |
| 4 points | Georgia |
| 3 points | Malta |
| 2 points | Denmark |
| 1 point | Latvia |

Points awarded by Bulgaria (Final)
| Score | Country |
|---|---|
| 12 points | Germany |
| 10 points | Greece |
| 8 points | Armenia |
| 7 points | Ukraine |
| 6 points | Russia |
| 5 points | Turkey |
| 4 points | Serbia |
| 3 points | Azerbaijan |
| 2 points | Israel |
| 1 point | Norway |
