= Pirates of the Sea =

Latvian musical project

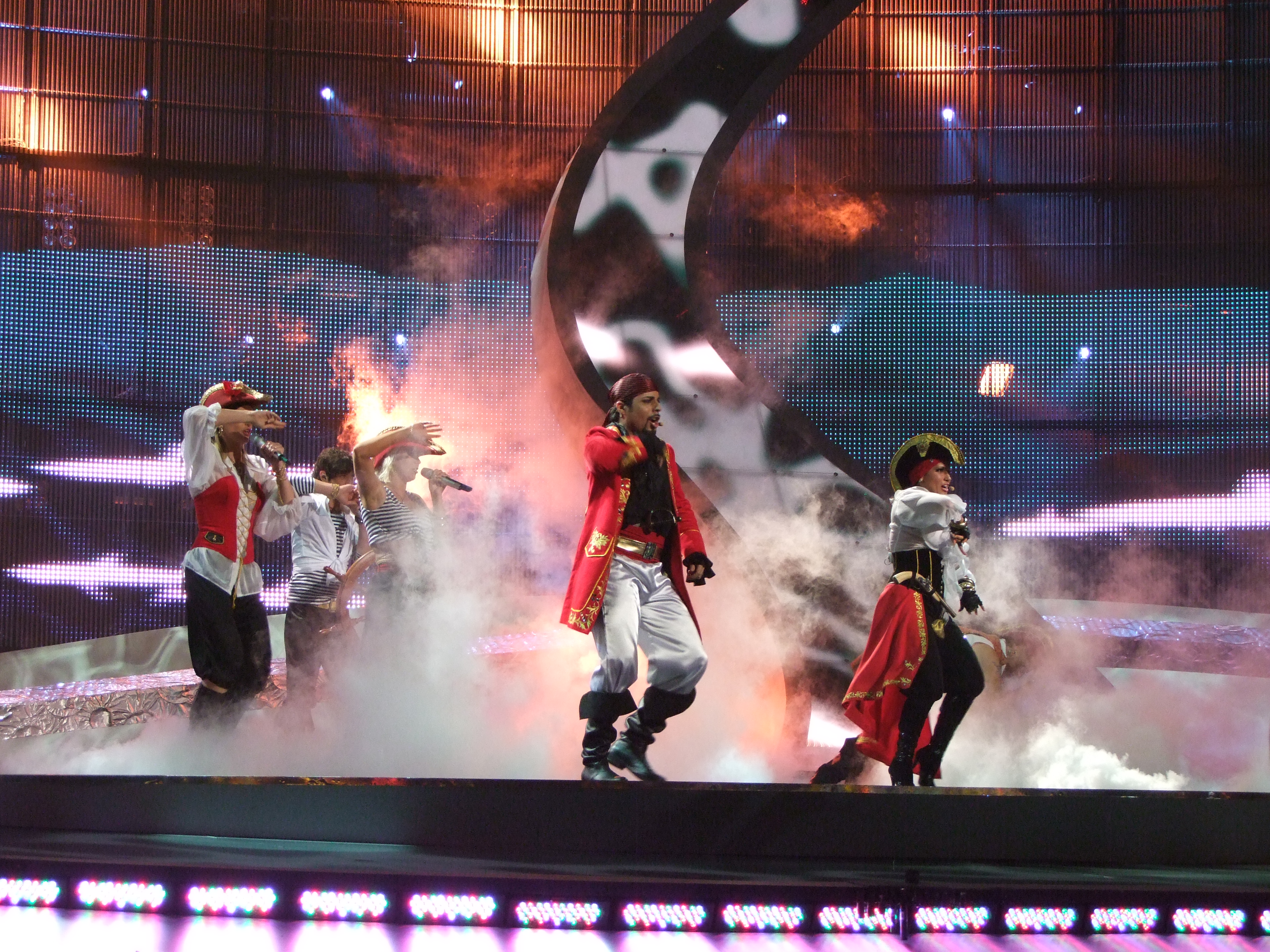
- Pirates of the Sea performing Wolves of the Sea at the Eurovision Song Contest 2008 in Belgrade

Background information
- Origin: Riga, Latvia
- Genres: Pop
- Years active: 2008–
- Members: Roberto Meloni; Aleksandra Kurusova
- Past members: Jānis Vaišļa

Pirates of the Sea is a musical project that in May 2008 represented Latvia in Eurovision Song Contest in Belgrade, Serbia with their song "Wolves of the Sea". It consists of three members: Italian singer Roberto Meloni who is living in Latvia, dancer Aleksandra Kurusova and until his death in 2016 the TV and radio personality Jānis Vaišļa. Meloni also represented Latvia in the Eurovision Song Contest 2007 as a part of Bonaparti.lv.

The song "Wolves of the Sea" was written by four Swedish composers: Jonas Liberg, Johan Sahlen, Claes Andreasson and Torbjörn Wassenius. On 2 February Pirates won the first semi-final of the national finals, getting 12,010 televotes - the best result of both semi-finals. However, the jury put them in ninth place from 10 songs of the first semi-final. On 1 March Pirates of the Sea also won the national final, which took place in Ventspils. They got 29,228 votes and beat their closest opponents Aisha and Andris Ērglis. On 22 May Pirates of the Sea participated in the second semi-final of Eurovision Song Contest 2008 and went on to become a finalist. Pirates of the Sea got the most points from Ireland (12) and United Kingdom (10) and were placed 12th in the final result of the competition.

On 30 October 2008 the pirate-themed power metal band Alestorm released a cover version of "Wolves of the Sea" on their EP Leviathan, and their 2009 album Black Sails at Midnight. Pirates of the Sea also had a song called "Happy Balalaika", released on a dance complication CD in Europe in 2008.

Jānis Vaišļa died on 9 January 2016 aged 46 from cardiac amyloidosis, after struggling with heart problems. He and fellow band member Aleksandra Kurusova had competed on the first season of The Amazing Race: China Rush, where they finished in 8th position.

== See also ==
- Latvia in the Eurovision Song Contest 2008

Awards and achievements
Preceded by Bonaparti.lv with "Questa notte"	Latvia in the Eurovision Song Contest; 2008	Succeeded by Intars Busulis with "Probka"
