= Georgia in the Eurovision Song Contest 2008 =

- Eurovision Song Contest 2008
- Participating broadcaster: Georgian Public Broadcaster (GPB)
- Country: Georgia
- Selection process: National final
- Selection date: 1 March 2008

Competing entry
- Song: "Peace Will Come"
- Artist: Diana Gurtskaya
- Songwriters: Kim Breitburg; Karen Kavaleryan

Placement
- Semi-final result: Qualified (5th, 107 points)
- Final result: 11th, 83 points

Participation chronology

Georgia was represented at the Eurovision Song Contest 2008 with the song "Peace Will Come", composed by Kim Breitburg, with lyrics by Karen Kavaleryan, and performed by Diana Gurtskaya. The Georgian participating broadcaster, the Georgian Public Broadcaster (GPB), held a national final in order to select its entry for the contest. An open call for submissions was held which resulted in the shortlisting of twelve entries that were presented to the public during a televised production on 1 March 2008. The results of a public televote exclusively resulted in the selection of "Peace Will Come" performed by Diana Gurtskaya as the Georgian entry, having received 39.4% of the votes.

Georgia was drawn to compete in the second semi-final of the Eurovision Song Contest which took place on 22 May 2008. Performing during the show in position 14, "Peace Will Come" was announced among the 10 qualifying entries of the first semi-final and therefore qualified to compete in the final on 24 May. It was later revealed that Georgia placed fifth out of the 19 participating countries in the semi-final with 107 points. In the final, Georgia performed in position 17 and placed eleventh out of the 25 participating countries, scoring 83 points.

== Background ==
Prior to the 2008 contest, the Georgian Public Broadcaster (GPB) had participated in the Eurovision Song Contest representing Georgia only once, in 2007, qualifying to the final with the song "Visionary Dream" performed by Sopho and placing 12th.

As part of its duties as participating broadcaster, GPB organises the selection of its entry in the Eurovision Song Contest and broadcasts the event in the country. The broadcaster confirmed its intentions to participate at the 2008 contest on 3 November 2007. In 2007, GPB opted to internally select its artist while the song was chosen in a national final. For their 2008 participation, both the artist and song was selected via a national final.

== Before Eurovision ==
=== National final ===
GPB opened a public submission from 3 November 2007 until 17 November 2007. 29 entries were received by the submission deadline and an expert commission selected the top twelve songs from the received submissions, which were announced on 29 November 2007 and presented to the public via the GPB First Channel programme Eurovision Year on 31 December 2007. The twelve entries were performed on 1 March 2008 via a special programme at the Sports Palace in Tbilisi, hosted by Sandro Gabisonia, Ana Tshadadze, Natia Tsalaia, and Buka Pachkoria and broadcast on the GPB First Channel as well as online at the broadcaster's website 1tv.ge. The winner, "Peace Will Come" performed by Diana Gurtskaya, was determined exclusively by a public televote. In addition to the performances of the competing entries, Sopho Khalvashi (who represented Georgia in 2007), Mariam Romelashvili (who represented Georgia in Junior Eurovision in 2007), and Ruslan Alekhno (who would represent Belarus in 2008) performed as guests.

Final – 1 March 2008
R/O	Artist	Song	Songwriter(s)	Televote	Place
1	Vivo	"Life"	Zaza Tsurtsumia	1.3%	8
2	Aleko Berdzenishvili	"The Beautiful Girl"	Mamuka Begashvili, Bibi Kvachadze	1.3%	9
3	Salome Gasviani	"Share Your Love"	Maia Kachkachishvili, Bibi Kvachadze	32.9%	2
4	Irakli Pirtskhalava	"Freedom"	Irakli Pirtskhalava	8.3%	3
5	Diana Gurtskaya	"Peace Will Come"	Kim Breitburg, Karen Kavaleryan	39.4%	1
6	Salome Korkotashvili	"Captaine"	Salome Korkotashvili	3.0%	6
7	Teatroni	"Sakartvelo itsvevs megobrebs" (საქართველოს ისთვევს მეგობრებს)	Kote Malania	2.3%	7
8	Tika Patsatsia	"Never Change"	Georgio, Giga Kukhianidze	4.0%	5
9	3G	"I'm Free"	Avto Badurashvili, Christine Imedadze	5.3%	4
10	Tako Gachechiladze	"Me and My Funky"	Bibi Kvachadze	0.9%	10
11	Tamta Chelidze	"Give Me Your Love"	Maia Kachkachishvili, Christine Imedadze	0.8%	11
12	Guga Aptsiauri	"Don't Look At Me"	Guga Aptsiauri, George Ergemlidze	0.5%	12

== At Eurovision ==
It was announced in September 2007 that the competition's format would be expanded to two semi-finals in 2008. According to Eurovision rules, all nations with the exceptions of the host country and the "Big Four" (France, Germany, Spain and the United Kingdom) are required to qualify from one of two semi-finals in order to compete for the final; the top nine songs from each semi-final as determined by televoting progress to the final, and a tenth was determined by back-up juries. The European Broadcasting Union (EBU) split up the competing countries into six different pots based on voting patterns from previous contests, with countries with favourable voting histories put into the same pot. On 28 January 2008, a special allocation draw was held which placed each country into one of the two semi-finals. Georgia was placed into the second semi-final, to be held on 22 May 2008. The running order for the semi-finals was decided through another draw on 17 March 2008 and Iceland was set to perform in position 1, following the entry from Denmark and before the entry from Hungary.

Both the semi-finals and the final were broadcast in Georgia on the GPB First Channel with commentary by Bibi Kvachadze. GPB appointed Tika Patsatsia as its spokesperson to announce the Georgian votes during the final.

=== Semi-final ===
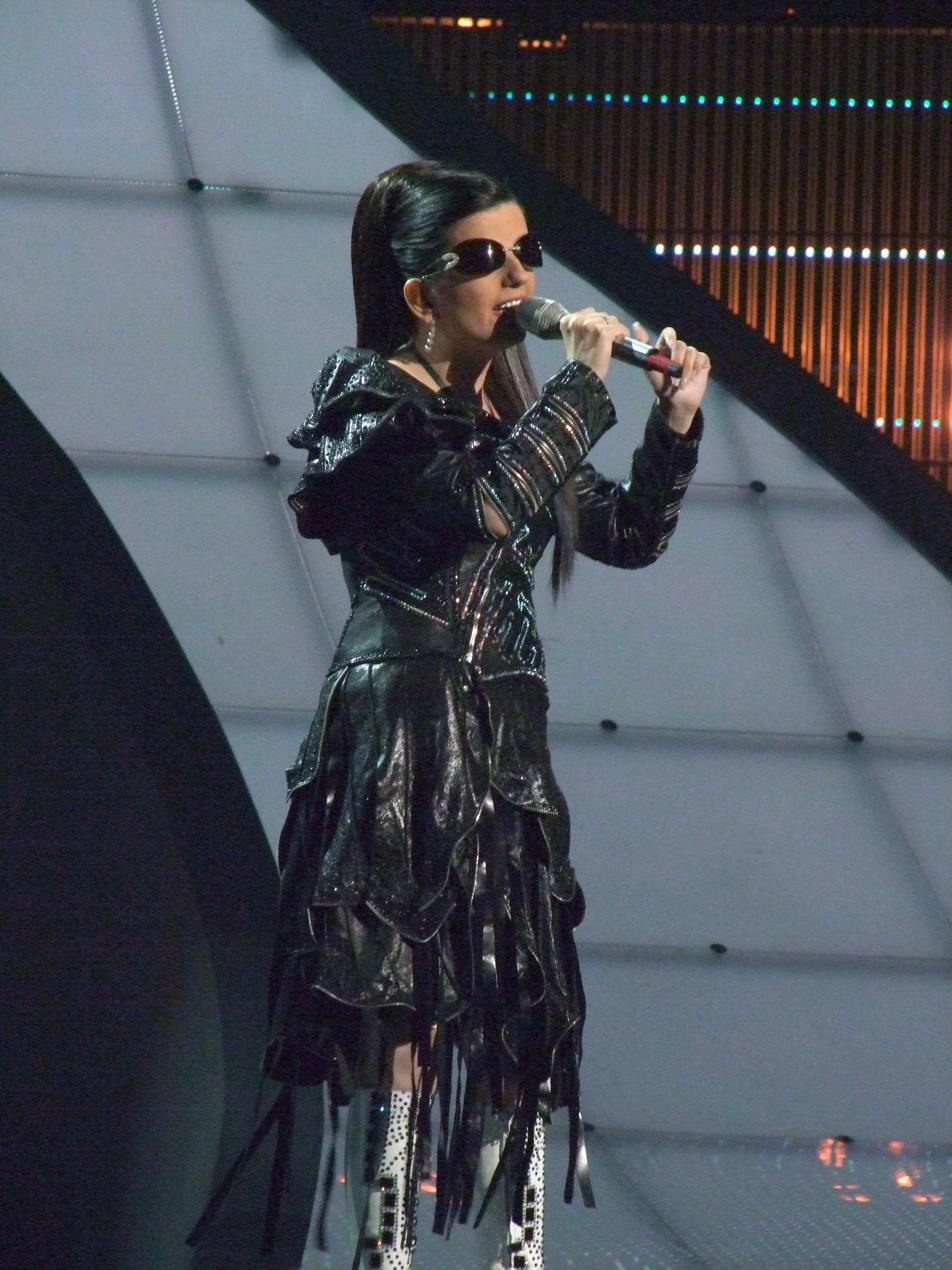
Diana Gurtskaya during a rehearsal before the second semi-final

Diana Gurtskaya took part in technical rehearsals on 14 and 18 May, followed by dress rehearsals on 21 and 22 May. The Georgian performance began with Diana Gurtskaya in a black designer dress with tassels and white high-heeled boots, joined on stage by two dancers and three backing vocalists in black outfits. At the climax of the song, a large piece of white fabric was lifted over Gurtskaya and the backing performers, revealing white outfits worn by all of the performers. The performance also featured smoke effects. Both of Gurtskaya's outfits were designed by Russian designers Dima Vinokurov and Lyuba Sukhova. Among the backing vocalists that joined Diana Gurtskaya was Anri Jokhadze, who would go on to represent Georgia in 2012.

At the end of the show, Georgia was announced as having finished in the top 10 and subsequently qualifying for the grand final. It was later revealed that Georgia placed fifth in the semi-final, receiving a total of 107 points.

=== Final ===
Shortly after the second semi-final, a winners' press conference was held for the ten qualifying countries. As part of this press conference, the qualifying artists took part in a draw to determine the running order of the final. This draw was done in the order the countries appeared in the semi-final running order. Georgia was drawn to perform in position 16, following the entry from Denmark and before the entry from Ukraine.

Diana Gurtskaya once again took part in dress rehearsals on 23 and 24 May before the final. Diana Gurtskaya performed a repeat of her semi-final performance during the final on 24 May. At the conclusion of the voting, Georgia finished in eleventh place with 83 points.

=== Voting ===
Below is a breakdown of points awarded to Georgia and awarded by Georgia in the second semi-final and grand final of the contest. The nation awarded its 12 points to Ukraine in the semi-final and to Armenia in the final of the contest.

==== Points awarded to Georgia ====
Points awarded to Georgia (Semi-final 2)
Score	Country
12 points	Cyprus; Ukraine
10 points	Belarus; Latvia; Lithuania; Malta; Turkey
8 points	Czech Republic
7 points	Portugal; Serbia
6 points	
5 points	
4 points	Bulgaria
3 points	
2 points	Hungary; Iceland; Macedonia
1 point	Sweden

Points awarded to Georgia (Final)
Score	Country
12 points	
10 points	Armenia
8 points	Latvia; Ukraine
7 points	Cyprus; Russia
6 points	Belarus
5 points	Estonia; Lithuania; Malta
4 points	Azerbaijan; Czech Republic; Greece; Turkey
3 points	Moldova
2 points	Israel
1 point	Portugal

==== Points awarded by Georgia ====
Points awarded by Georgia (Semi-final 2)
Score	Country
12 points	Ukraine
10 points	Lithuania
8 points	Croatia
7 points	Portugal
6 points	Latvia
5 points	Turkey
4 points	Belarus
3 points	Denmark
2 points	Cyprus
1 point	Hungary

Points awarded by Georgia (Final)
Score	Country
12 points	Armenia
10 points	Ukraine
8 points	Russia
7 points	Azerbaijan
6 points	Turkey
5 points	Norway
4 points	Greece
3 points	Israel
2 points	Latvia
1 point	Croatia
