= Switzerland in the Eurovision Song Contest 2008 =

- Eurovision Song Contest 2008
- Participating broadcaster: Swiss Broadcasting Corporation (SRG SSR)
- Country: Switzerland
- Selection process: Internal selection
- Announcement date: Artist: 25 November 2007; Song: 12 January 2008

Competing entry
- Song: "Era stupendo"
- Artist: Paolo Meneguzzi
- Songwriters: Paolo Meneguzzi; Mattias Brånn; Vincenzo Incenzo

Placement
- Semi-final result: Failed to qualify (13th)

Participation chronology

Switzerland was represented at the Eurovision Song Contest 2008 with the song "Era stupendo", written by Paolo Meneguzzi, Mattias Brånn, and Vincenzo Incenzo, and performed by Meneguzzi himself. The Swiss participating broadcaster, the Swiss Broadcasting Corporation (SRG SSR), internally selected its entry for the contest.

Many artists announced their intention to submit songs to SRG SSR in the hope of representing Switzerland in the Eurovision Song Contest 2008. "Era stupendo" performed in Italian by Paolo Meneguzzi was internally selected by the broadcaster.

== Background ==
Prior to the 2008 contest, the Swiss Broadcasting Corporation (SRG SSR) had participated in the Eurovision Song Contest representing Switzerland forty-eight times since their first entry in 1956. It won that first edition of the contest with the song "Refrain" performed by Lys Assia. Its second victory was achieved in 1988 with the song "Ne partez pas sans moi" performed by Canadian singer Céline Dion. Following the introduction of semi-finals for the 2004 contest, Switzerland managed to participate in the final twice. In 2005, the internal selection of "Cool Vibes", performed by Estonian girl band Vanilla Ninja, qualified and placed 8th in the final. Due to their successful result in 2005, Switzerland was pre-qualified to compete directly in the final in 2006. Switzerland did not manage to make it to the final in 2007 with "Vampires Are Alive" by DJ BoBo.

As part of its duties as participating broadcaster, SRG SSR organises the selection of its entry in the Eurovision Song Contest and broadcasts the event in the country.

== Before Eurovision ==
=== Internal selection ===
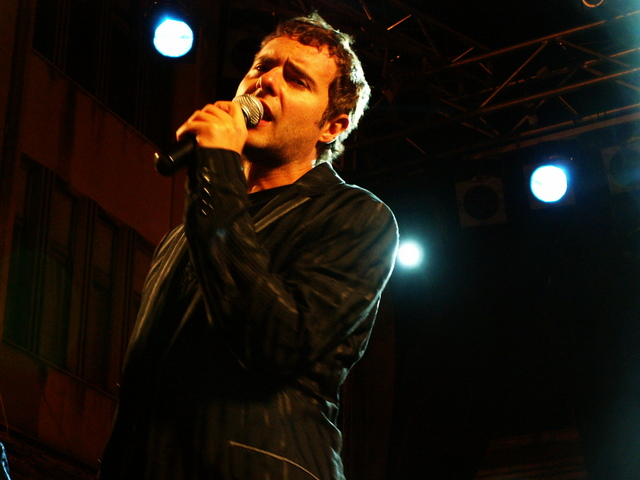
Paolo Meneguzzi was internally selected to represent Switzerland in the Eurovision Song Contest 2008

SRG SSR opened a submission period between 20 July 2007 and 22 October 2007 for interested artists and composers to submit their entries. Eligible artists were those that have had television and stage experience (live performances), have made at least one video and have released at least one CD which placed among the top 50 in an official chart. In addition to the public submission, the broadcaster was also in contact with individual composers and lyricists as well as the music industry to be involved in the selection process.

On 25 November 2007, Swiss newspaper Blick claimed that "Era stupendo" performed by Paolo Meneguzzi would be the Swiss entry for the Eurovision Song Contest 2008, which was subsequently confirmed by SRG SSR on the same day. Both the artist and song were selected by a jury panel consisting of representatives of the three broadcasters in Switzerland: the Swiss-German broadcaster Schweizer Fernsehen (SF), the Swiss-French broadcaster Télévision Suisse Romande (TSR) and the Swiss-Italian broadcaster Televisione svizzera di lingua italiana (TSI), as well as the radio station from Schweizer Radio DRS and the music channel VIVA Switzerland. Among the artists that submitted a song included Gimma, Jürgen Drews, and Peach Weber. In regards to his selection as the Swiss entrant, Meneguzzi stated: "I'm very happy and honoured to represent my homeland at Eurovision 2008. I'm anxious to go to the stage and to perform my song. I hope to meet new friends, new fans from many different nationalities who will vote for me and many new feelings we'll live together. [...] See all of you in Belgrade!".

"Era stupendo", which was written by Paolo Meneguzzi together with Mattias Brånn and Vincenzo Incenzo, was presented to the public on 12 January 2008 during the annual SwissAward show broadcast on SF1, TSR 2, and TSI 2. The official music video of the song was released on 18 March 2008.

=== Controversy ===
After the release of the song, there was speculation that "Era stupendo" was a plagiarism of "It Can Only Get Better" by Swedish singer Amy Diamond who was competing in the 2008 Swedish national final Melodifestivalen 2008. Accusations arose that the beginnings of both songs were too similar to be a coincidence, however the song was not disqualified by the European Broadcasting Union (EBU), the organiser of the contest.

=== Promotion ===
"Era stupendo" was released as a CD single ahead of the contest.

Promoting his song, Meneguzzi appeared on a Eurovision special on Maltese NET Television in April 2008. A CD single featuring the song was published, which peaked at number 11 on the Swiss Singles Chart in June 2008.

== At Eurovision ==
The Eurovision Song Contest 2008 took place at the Belgrade Arena in Belgrade, Serbia. It consisted of two semi-finals held on 20 and 22 May, respectively, and the final on 24 May 2008. According to the Eurovision rules at the time, all participating countries, except the host nation and the "Big Four", consisting of France, Germany, Spain, and the United Kingdom, were required to qualify from one of the two semi-finals to compete for the final; the top 10 countries from the respective semi-finals would proceed to the final. On 28 January 2008, an allocation draw was held that placed each country into one of the two semi-finals, with Switzerland being placed into the second semi-final. The 2008 contest was the first to feature two semi-finals, a change intended to reduce the problems of neighbourly and diaspora voting that occurred in years past. Countries that normally would vote for each other were placed into separate semi-finals. Once all of the competing songs for the Eurovision Song Contest had been released, the running order for the semi-finals was decided by the delegation heads of the 43 participating countries of the contest rather than through another draw; the nation was assigned position seven, following Albania and preceding the Czech Republic.

The commentators at the event were Sven Epiney for SF, Sandy Altermatt for RTSI, and Jean-Marc Richard and Nicolas Tanner for TSR. SRG SSR appointed Cécile Bähler as its spokesperson to announce the results of the Swiss televote for the contest.

=== Semi-final ===
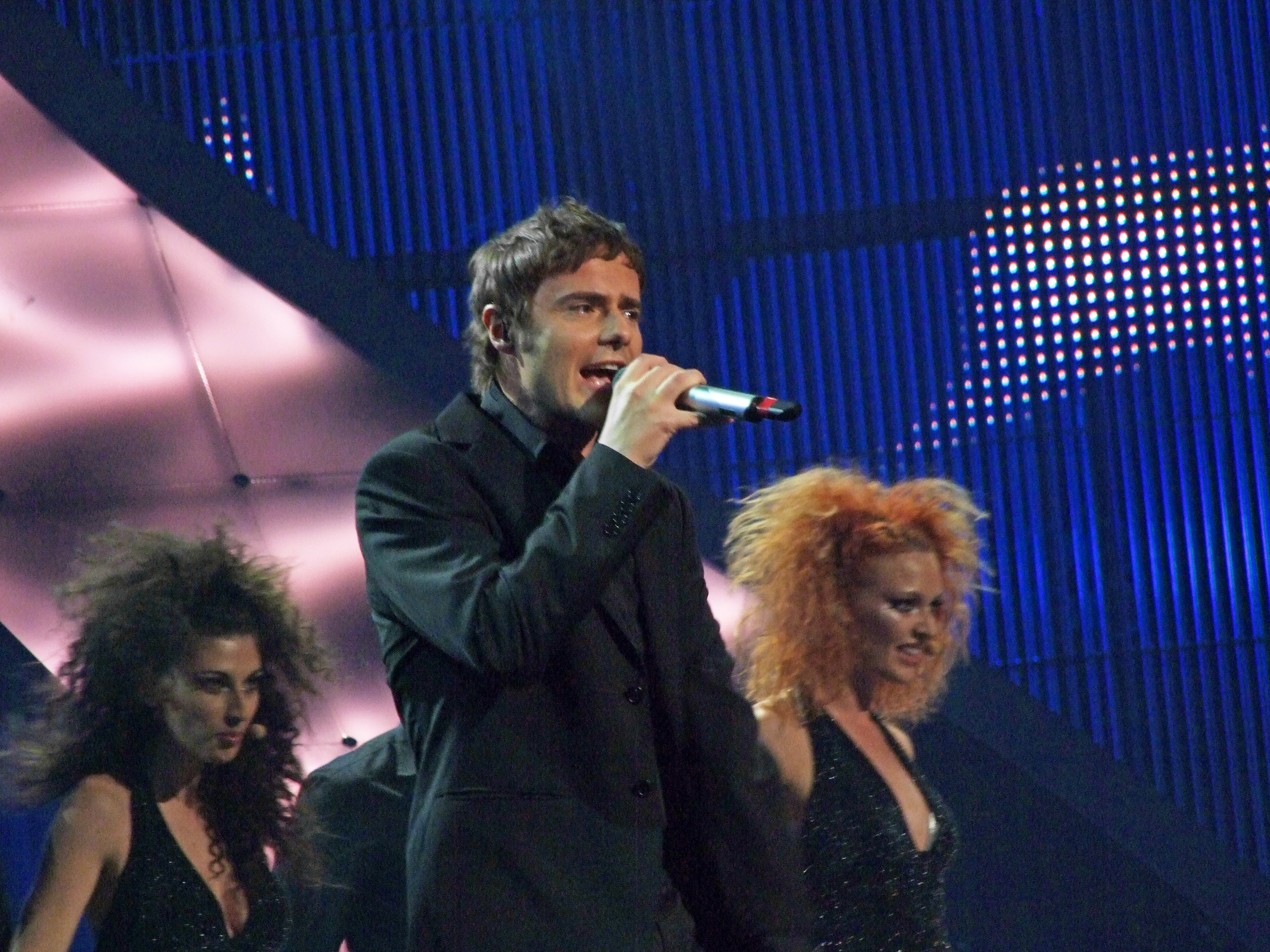
Meneguzzi performing "Era stupendo" during the second semi-final.

Meneguzzi sang in the second semi-final on 22 May 2008, performing 7th on the night. His performance included him wearing a black suit with a black shirt, and included two male and two female backing dancers and singers; the women dressed in black dresses with silver gloves, and the men in black shirts and black trousers. A pianist was also present on stage, dressed in a white shirt and black tie. The song began with Meneguzzi singing solo in the centre of the stage, with the back-up dancers surrounding the piano. As the song sped up, the dancers moved to behind Meneguzzi and began to sing. The performance included the use of pyrotechnics when the song sped up, as well as during the bridge. Despite being a fan favourite the song only managed to receive 47 points, placing 13th in a field of 19 and failing to qualify for the final.

=== Voting ===
Below is a breakdown of points awarded to Switzerland in the second semi-final of the Eurovision Song Contest 2008, as well as by the country in the semi-final and final. Meneguzzi's performance received 47 points, placing the nation 13th of the 19 entries and not qualifying for the final.

==== Points awarded to Switzerland ====
Points awarded to Switzerland (Semi-final 2)
Score	Country
12 points	Malta
10 points	Albania
8 points	
7 points	Cyprus; France
6 points	
5 points	Croatia; Denmark
4 points	
3 points	
2 points	
1 point	Macedonia

==== Points awarded by Switzerland ====
Points awarded by Switzerland (Semi-final 2)
Score	Country
12 points	Portugal
10 points	Albania
8 points	Macedonia
7 points	Turkey
6 points	Croatia
5 points	Denmark
4 points	Iceland
3 points	Sweden
2 points	Cyprus
1 point	Ukraine

Points awarded by Switzerland (Final)
Score	Country
12 points	Serbia
10 points	Portugal
8 points	Albania
7 points	Bosnia and Herzegovina
6 points	Turkey
5 points	Greece
4 points	Spain
3 points	Croatia
2 points	Germany
1 point	Israel
