= Belarus in the Eurovision Song Contest 2008 =

- Eurovision Song Contest 2008
- Participating broadcaster: Belarusian Television and Radio Company (BTRC)
- Country: Belarus
- Selection process: Eurofest 2008
- Selection date: 21 January 2008

Competing entry
- Song: "Hasta la vista"
- Artist: Ruslan Alekhno
- Songwriters: Eleonora Melnik; Taras Demchuk

Placement
- Semi-final result: Failed to qualify (17th)

Participation chronology

Belarus was represented at the Eurovision Song Contest 2008 with the song "Hasta la vista", composed by Taras Demchuk, with lyrics by Eleonora Melnik, and performed by Ruslan Alekhno. The Belarusian participating broadcaster, Belarusian Television and Radio Company (BTRC), selected its entry through a national final.

The national final was a televised production which consisted of a semi-final and a final held on 21 December 2007 and 21 January 2008, respectively. Fifteen competing acts participated in the semi-final where four entries qualified to the final: one entry selected by a public televote and three entries selected by a nine-member jury panel. In the final, the jury panel selected "Hasta la vista" performed by Ruslan Alekhno as the winner.

Belarus was drawn to compete in the second semi-final of the Eurovision Song Contest which took place on 22 May 2008. Performing during the show in position 9, "Hasta la vista" was not announced among the 10 qualifying entries of the first semi-final and therefore did not qualify to compete in the final. It was later revealed that Belarus placed seventeenth out of the 19 participating countries in the semi-final with 27 points.

== Background ==
Prior to the 2008 Contest, Belarusian Television and Radio Company (BTRC) had participated in the Eurovision Song Contest representing Belarus four times since its first entry in 2004. Its best placing in the contest was sixth, which it achieved in 2007 with the song "Work Your Magic" performed by Dmitry Koldun. Following the introduction of semi-finals for the 2004, it had only managed to qualify to the final once.

As part of its duties as participating broadcaster, BTRC organises the selection of its entry in the Eurovision Song Contest and broadcasts the event in the country. Since 2004, the broadcaster has organised a national final in order to choose its entry, a selection procedure that continued for its 2008 entry.

== Before Eurovision ==
=== Eurofest 2008 ===
Eurofest 2008 was the national final format developed by BTRC to select its entry for the Eurovision Song Contest 2008. The competition consisted of a semi-final and final held on 21 December 2007 and 21 January 2008, respectively. Both shows were hosted by Denis Kurian and Vera Poliakova and broadcast on the First Channel and Belarus TV as well as online via the broadcaster's official website tvr.by.

==== Format ====
The competition consisted of three stages. In the first stage, artists and songwriters had the opportunity to apply for the competition by attending live auditions during designated dates. Fifteen entries were selected to participate in the second stage out of all the submitted applications. The second stage was the televised semi-final which took place on 21 December 2007. Four entries advanced to the final based on a public televote and the votes from an expert jury. The fifteen songs first faced a public televote where one entry qualified to the final. The jury then selected an additional three qualifiers from the remaining entries. The third stage was the final, which took place on 21 January 2008 where the votes from an expert jury determined the winner that would represent Belarus in Belgrade out of the four acts. The competition rules also allowed for the finalists to completely change their candidate songs.

The jury panel that participated in the semi-final and final consisted of:

- Mihail Finberg (chairman of the jury) – director of the Belarusian State Academic Symphony Orchestra
- Anatoly Yarmolenko – director of the ensemble Syabry
- Vasily Rainchik – director of the Youth Variety Theater
- Yadviga Poplavskaya – singer and composer
- Leonid Shirin – composer
- Irina Dorofeeva – singer
- Vladimir Rylatko – first deputy of the Belarusian Ministry of Culture

==== Competing entries ====
Artists and composers were able to submit their applications and entries to the broadcaster between 15 November 2007 and 20 November 2007. At the closing of the deadline, 122 entries were received by the broadcaster. 76 entries were selected for auditions that were held between 5 and 7 December 2007 at the Youth Variety Theater in Minsk where a jury panel was tasked with selecting fifteen entries to proceed to the televised national final. The jury consisted of Mihail Finberg, Anatoly Yarmolenko, Vasily Rainchik, Yadviga Poplavskaya, Leonid Shirin, Irina Dorofeeva and Vladimir Rylatko. The selected semi-finalists were announced on 11 December 2007 during a press conference in Minsk.

| Artist | Song | Songwriter(s) |
|---|---|---|
| Anna Sharkunova and German Titov | "My budem pervye" (Мы будем первые) | Max Aleinikov, Vladimir Kubyshkin |
| Dali | "Silver Sky" | Victor Rudenko |
| Gunesh | "I Can't Live Without You" | Gunesh Abasova, Marina Khaitbayeva, Gleb Galushko |
| Katrin | "Follow Me" | Ekaterina Tsvirko, Andrey Kostyugov |
| Lena Voloshina | "That's All I Feel" | Leonid Shirin, Andrey Kostyugov |
| Litesound | "Do You Believe" | Dmitry Karyakin, Vladimir Karyakin |
| Oksana Kovalevskaya | "Vsegda odna" (Всегда одна) | Oksana Kovalevskaya |
| Palats | "Kola mlyna" (Кола млына) | Alieh Chamienka |
| PinCode | "You Can" | Nina Bogdanova, Vitaliy Masalsky |
| Po glazam | "Devochka tryohtysachnih let" (Девочка трёхтысячных лет) | Stasi Zylikavaj |
| Ruslan Alekhno | "Hasta la vista" | Taras Demchuk, Eleonora Melnik |
| Scandal | "Everybody" | Ioannis Ksinakis, Andrey Kostyugov |
| The Champions | "Drive Me Crazy" | Vyacheslav Lyschik, Olisa Emeka Orakposim |
| Victor Pshenichniy | "Baby Blue" | Alexander Nabeev |
| Yuliya Guseva | "Maybe" | Alexander Melnikov |

==== Semi-final ====
The televised semi-final took place on 21 December 2007 at the BTRC studios in Minsk. Prior to the semi-final, a draw for the running order took place on 20 December 2007. Four songs qualified to the final. The fifteen competing entries first faced a public televote where one song advanced. An additional three qualifiers were selected from the remaining fourteen entries by the votes of jury members made up of music professionals.

Public vote qualifier Jury qualifier

Semi-final – 21 December 2007
| R/O | Artist | Song | Televote | Place | Result |
|---|---|---|---|---|---|
| 1 | The Champions | "Drive Me Crazy" | 486 | 12 | —N/a |
| 2 | Lena Voloshina | "That's All I Feel" | 858 | 8 | —N/a |
| 3 | Yuliya Guseva | "Maybe" | 759 | 9 | —N/a |
| 4 | Anna Sharkunova and German Titov | "My budem pervye" | 991 | 7 | —N/a |
| 5 | Ruslan Alekhno | "Hasta la vista" | 6,089 | 1 | Qualified |
| 6 | Oksana Kovalevskaya | "Vsegda odna" | 271 | 15 | —N/a |
| 7 | PinCode | "You Can" | 1,075 | 6 | —N/a |
| 8 | Victor Pshenichniy | "Baby Blue" | 338 | 14 | —N/a |
| 9 | Gunesh | "I Can't Live Without You" | 2,317 | 4 | Qualified |
| 10 | Scandal | "Everybody" | 1,689 | 5 | —N/a |
| 11 | Po glazam | "Devochka tryohtysachnih let" | 420 | 13 | Qualified |
| 12 | Palats | "Kola mlyna" | 2,438 | 3 | —N/a |
| 13 | Dali | "Silver Sky" | 679 | 10 | —N/a |
| 14 | Katrin | "Follow Me" | 663 | 11 | —N/a |
| 15 | Litesound | "Do You Believe" | 3,967 | 2 | Qualified |

==== Final ====
The televised final took place on 21 January 2008 at the Sports Palace in Minsk. The votes of jury members made up of music professionals selected the song "Hasta la vista" performed by Ruslan Alekhno as the winner.

In addition to the performances from the competitors, the show featured guest performances by former Eurovision Song Contest winners Sertab Erener (2003), Ruslana (2004) and Lordi (2006), 2005 Russian Eurovision contestant Natalia Podolskaya and Belarusian Junior Eurovision Song Contest 2007 winner Alexey Zhigalkovich.

Final – 21 January 2008
| R/O | Artist | Song |
|---|---|---|
| 1 | Po glazam | "Devochka tryohtysachnih let" |
| 2 | Gunesh | "I Can't Live Without You" |
| 3 | Litesound | "Do You Believe" |
| 4 | Ruslan Alekhno | "Hasta la vista" |

=== Promotion ===
Ruslan Alekhno made several appearances across Europe to specifically promote "Hasta la vista" as the Belarusian Eurovision entry. Between 27 February and 9 March, Ruslan Alekhno performed "Hasta la vista" during the Georgian, Greek, Lithuanian, Macedonian and Russian Eurovision national finals. On 25 April, Alekhno performed during the UKEurovision Preview Party event which was held at the Scala Club in London, United Kingdom.

== At Eurovision ==
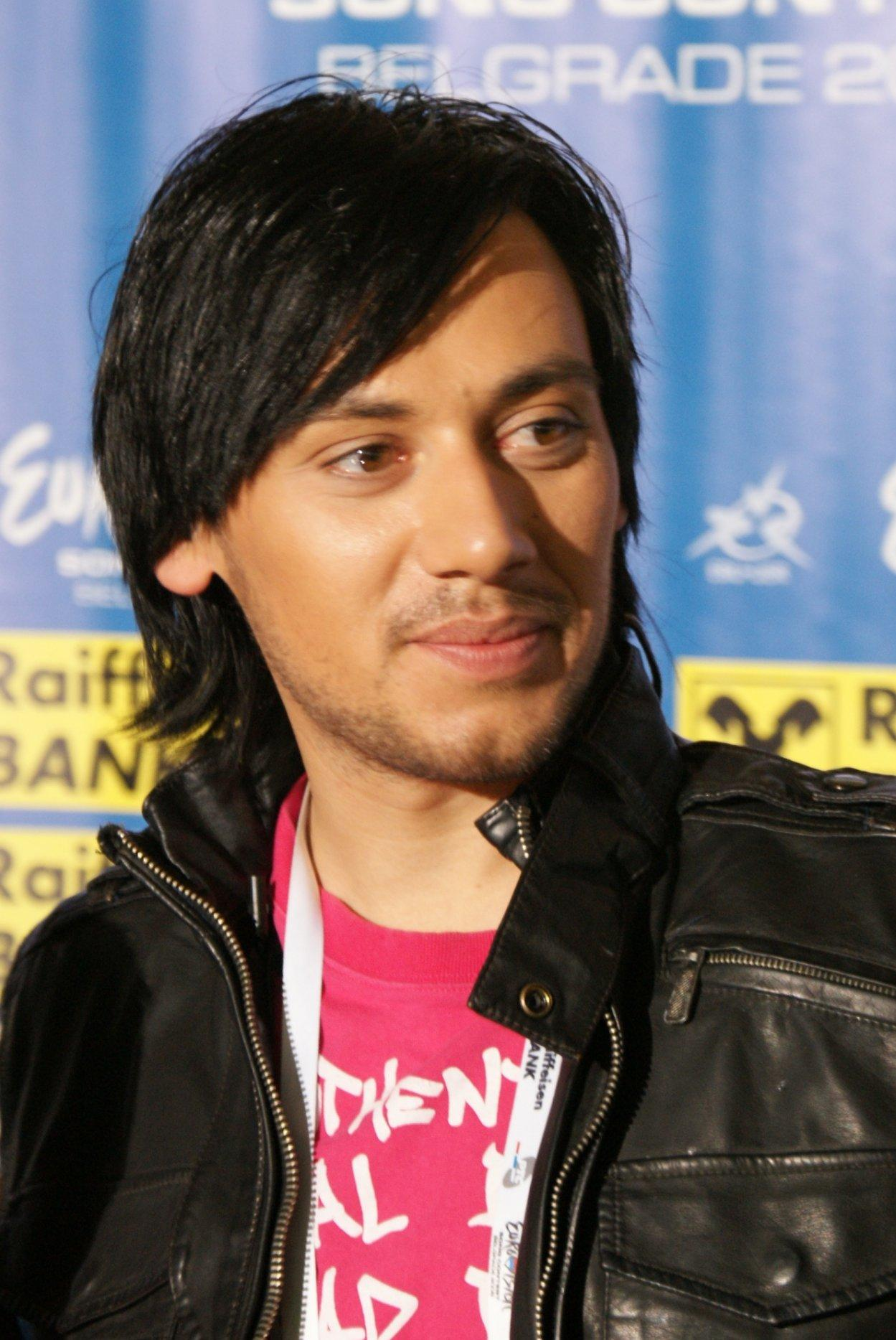
Ruslan Alekhno during a press meet and greet

According to Eurovision rules, all nations with the exceptions of the host country and the "Big Four" (France, Germany, Spain and the United Kingdom) are required to qualify from one of two semi-finals in order to compete for the final; the top nine countries from the televoting progress to the final, and a tenth qualifier was determined by the back-up juries. The European Broadcasting Union (EBU) split up the competing countries into six different pots based on voting patterns from previous contests, with countries with favourable voting histories put into the same pot. On 28 January 2008, a special allocation draw was held which placed each country into one of the two semi-finals. Belarus was placed into the second semi-final, to be held on 22 May 2008. The running order for the semi-finals was decided through another draw on 17 March 2008 and Belarus was set to perform in position 9, following the entry from Czech Republic and before the entry from Latvia.

The two semi-finals and the final were broadcast in Belarus on the First Channel with commentary by Denis Kurian and Alexander Tikhanovich. The Belarusian spokesperson, who announced the Belarusian votes during the final, was Olga Barabanschikova.

=== Semi-final ===
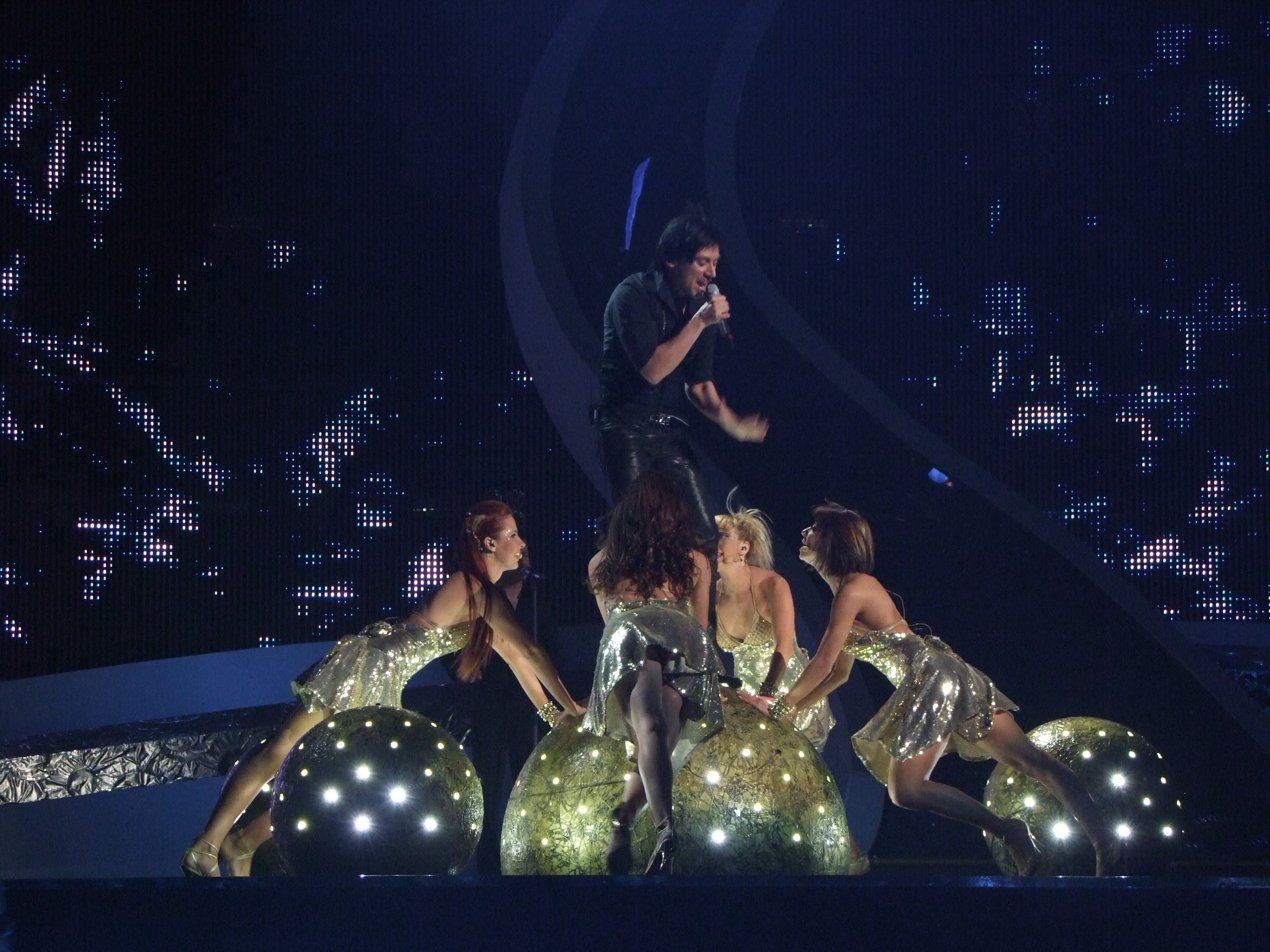
Ruslan Alekhno during a rehearsal before the second semi-final

Ruslan Alekhno took part in technical rehearsals on 13 and 17 May, followed by dress rehearsals on 21 and 22 May. The Belarusian performance featured Ruslan Alekhno performing on stage wearing a black outfit together with four female dancers wearing short silver dresses. The performers performed a choreographed routine around five light-up baubles that moved around on the stage floor during the performance, which was concluded by the dancers displaying the letter R.

At the end of the show, Belarus was not announced among the 10 qualifying entries in the second semi-final and therefore failed to qualify to compete in the final. It was later revealed that Belarus placed seventeenth in the semi-final, receiving a total of 27 points.

=== Voting ===
Below is a breakdown of points awarded to Belarus and awarded by Belarus in the second semi-final and grand final of the contest. The nation awarded its 12 points to Ukraine in the semi-final and to Russia in the final of the contest.

==== Points awarded to Belarus ====
Points awarded to Belarus (Semi-final 2)
| Score | Country |
|---|---|
| 12 points | |
| 10 points | Ukraine |
| 8 points | |
| 7 points | |
| 6 points | Lithuania |
| 5 points | Latvia |
| 4 points | Georgia |
| 3 points | |
| 2 points | Cyprus |
| 1 point | |

==== Points awarded by Belarus ====
Points awarded by Belarus (Semi-final 2)
| Score | Country |
|---|---|
| 12 points | Ukraine |
| 10 points | Georgia |
| 8 points | Portugal |
| 7 points | Croatia |
| 6 points | Latvia |
| 5 points | Albania |
| 4 points | Denmark |
| 3 points | Turkey |
| 2 points | Bulgaria |
| 1 point | Iceland |

Points awarded by Belarus (Final)
| Score | Country |
|---|---|
| 12 points | Russia |
| 10 points | Ukraine |
| 8 points | Azerbaijan |
| 7 points | Armenia |
| 6 points | Georgia |
| 5 points | Norway |
| 4 points | Israel |
| 3 points | Turkey |
| 2 points | Greece |
| 1 point | Serbia |
