= Mor ve ötesi =

Turkish alternative rock band

mor ve ötesi
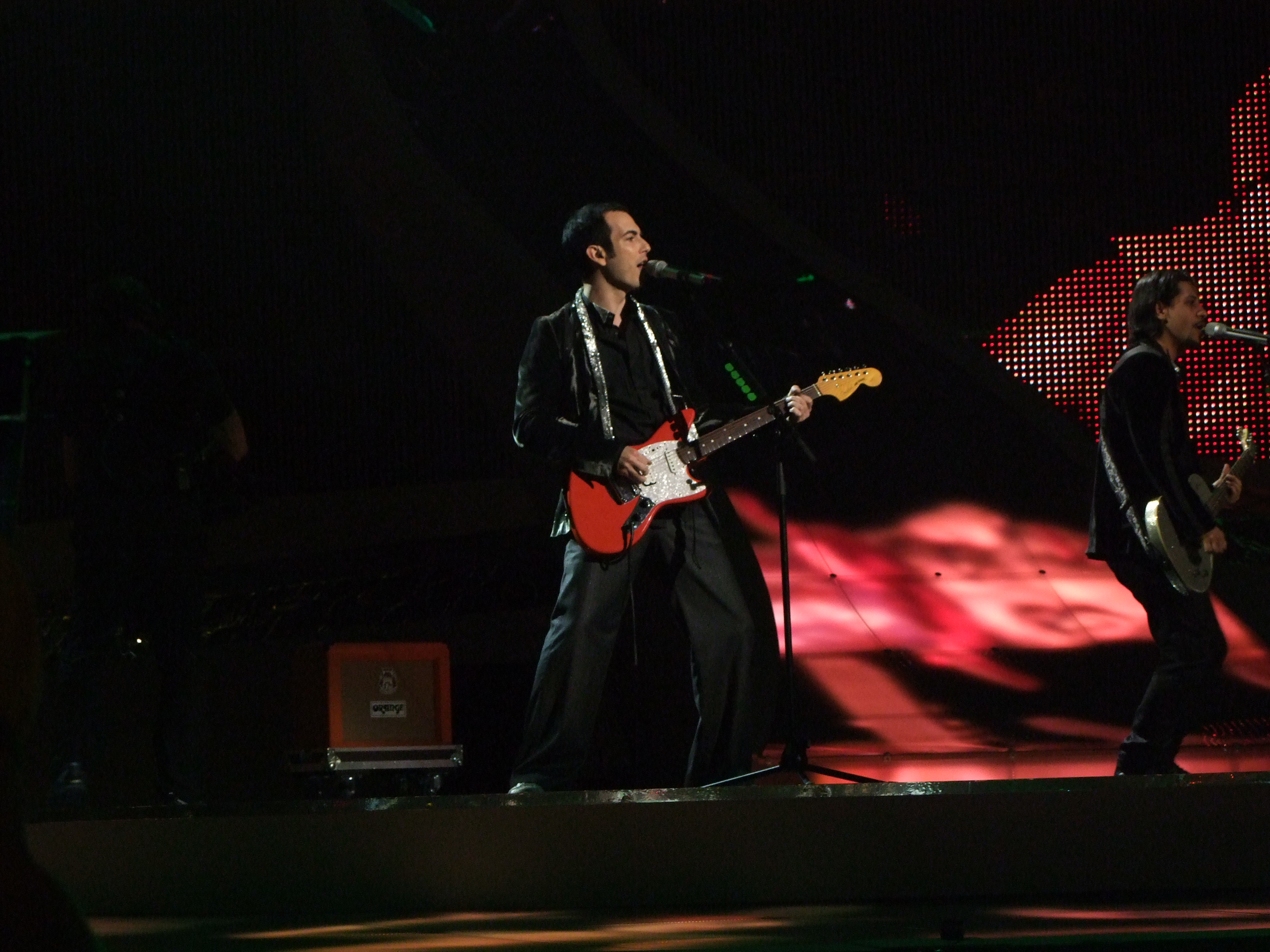
- Mor ve Ötesi performing at Eurovision Song Contest 2008

Background information
- Origin: Istanbul, Turkey
- Genres: Alternative rock, experimental rock (early)
- Years active: 1995–present
- Label: RAKUN
- Members: Harun Tekin (vocals and rhythm guitar); Kerem Kabadayı (drums); Burak Güven (bass); Kerem Özyeğen (lead guitar)
- Past members: Alper Tekin (bass); Derin Esmer (vocals & guitar)
- Website: morveotesi.com

Mor ve Ötesi (stylized as mor ve ötesi) (literally Purple and Beyond; a play on the word morötesi, meaning ultraviolet) is a Turkish alternative rock band from Istanbul. Its four current members are Harun Tekin (vocals and rhythm guitar), Kerem Kabadayı (drums), Burak Güven (bass) and Kerem Özyeğen (lead guitar). Former members include Alper Tekin and Derin Esmer. The band achieved mainstream success with the release of the album Dünya Yalan Söylüyor. In 2008, the band represented Turkey in the Eurovision Song Contest in Belgrade with the song "Deli" (Lunatic).

Mor ve Ötesi had their breakthrough with their fourth album Dünya Yalan Söylüyor in 2004. The album sold over 300,000 copies and changed the way rock was perceived by the Turkish music industry. Their hundreds of live performances have included several tours in Europe and the United States. The band celebrated their 20th anniversary in 2016 with two special CD box-sets containing all of their published work.

== History ==
Mor ve Ötesi was formed in 1995 with the line-up of Kerem Kabadayı (drums), Harun Tekin (vocals and guitar), Derin Esmer (vocals and guitar) and Alper Tekin (bass), who were then students at the Deutsche Schule Istanbul. They released their first album Şehir ("The City") in September 1996 and played their first live concert in Ankara. That year, Burak Güven replaced Alper Tekin on bass.

The band's second album Bırak Zaman Aksın ("Let Time Flow"), was released in January 1999 and was met with success. Just after its release, Derin Esmer moved to the United States and was replaced by prominent guitarist Kerem Özyeğen. After the devastating 1999 Kocaeli earthquake, Mor ve Ötesi started exploring more social and political themes. They were also very active in the opposition against the use of nuclear energy in Turkey.

In August 2001, they released their third album, Gül Kendine ("Smile at Yourself"). With Kerem Özyeğen, there was a noticeable change in the band's music and lyrics. In May 2003, Mor ve Ötesi's released the Yaz EP, which included a cover of the Ajda Pekkan song "Yaz Yaz Yaz".

Their fourth album Dünya Yalan Söylüyor ("The World is Lying") was released in March 2004. The album became their most popular album in Turkey, reaching 250,000 sales. Since their previous work was not as well known, many new fans were not aware of the band's history. Although it had been their best selling album, it is not admired by many of their old fans as much as their previous work, and some have even seen it as "sell-out". The album contained considerable political criticism against the activities of the United States; both in Iraq and the rest of the world as heard in songs such as "Yardım Et" and "Cambaz". In the same year, they received a Golden Orange Award for their single "Bir Derdim Var", included on the soundtrack of the Çağan Irmak film Mustafa Hakkında Her Şey.

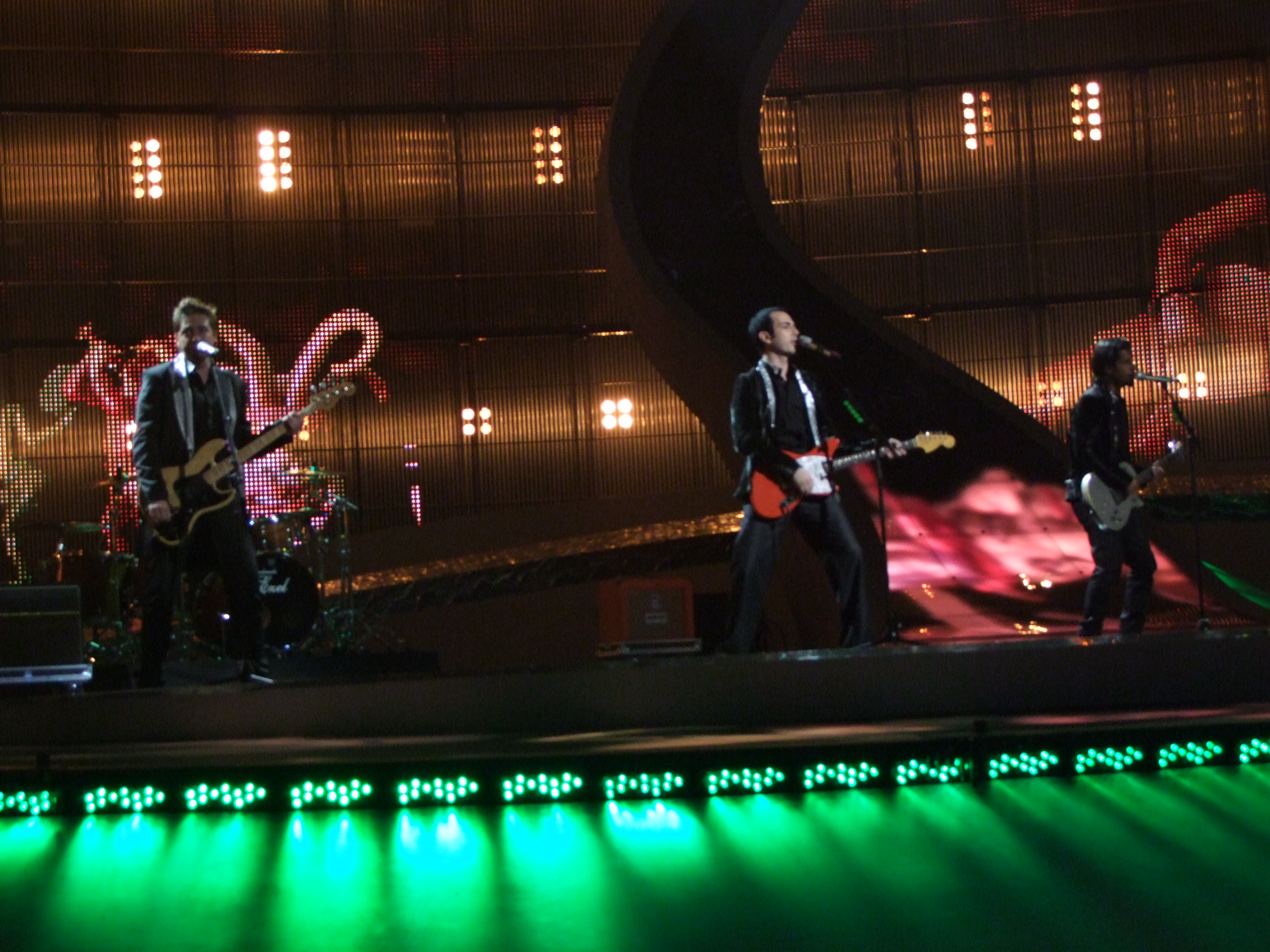
Mor ve Ötesi performing at Eurovision

Their fifth album Büyük Düşler ("Great Hopes") was released on 9 May 2006. The album mainly dealt with the political problems of Turkey and the personal problems of the group members, including loss of family members and their relationships. It also had a noticeably darker sound in comparison to their previous albums. Büyük Düşler is regarded as a homage to their old fan base and a return to a style closer to their earlier albums. Three singles were released from the album: "Şirket", "Küçük Sevgilim", and "Ayıp Olmaz Mı?". Büyük Düşler was named Best Album of the Year by Rolling Stone Turkey and Best Rock Album of the Year by Blue Jean magazine.

On 10 December 2007, TRT's general manager İbrahim Şahin announced that Mor ve Ötesi were to represent Turkey in Eurovision Song Contest 2008 with the song 'Deli'. Mor ve Ötesi qualified to finals through the second half of the semi-finals on 22 May. They had the 12th performance on the finals and finished the contest in 7th place with 138 points, which was held in Belgrade on 24 May 2008. During the contest, BBC commentator Terry Wogan described the lead singer as "a sinister James Bond".

The band's sixth album, Başıbozuk, was released in late 2008, and included three studio and four live tracks, including their Eurovision entry, as well as remixes.

Their seventh album "Masumiyetin Ziyan Olmaz" ("Your Innocence Won't Go To Waste") came out on 12 May 2010.

Their eighth album "Güneşi Beklerken" was released on 17 December 2012.

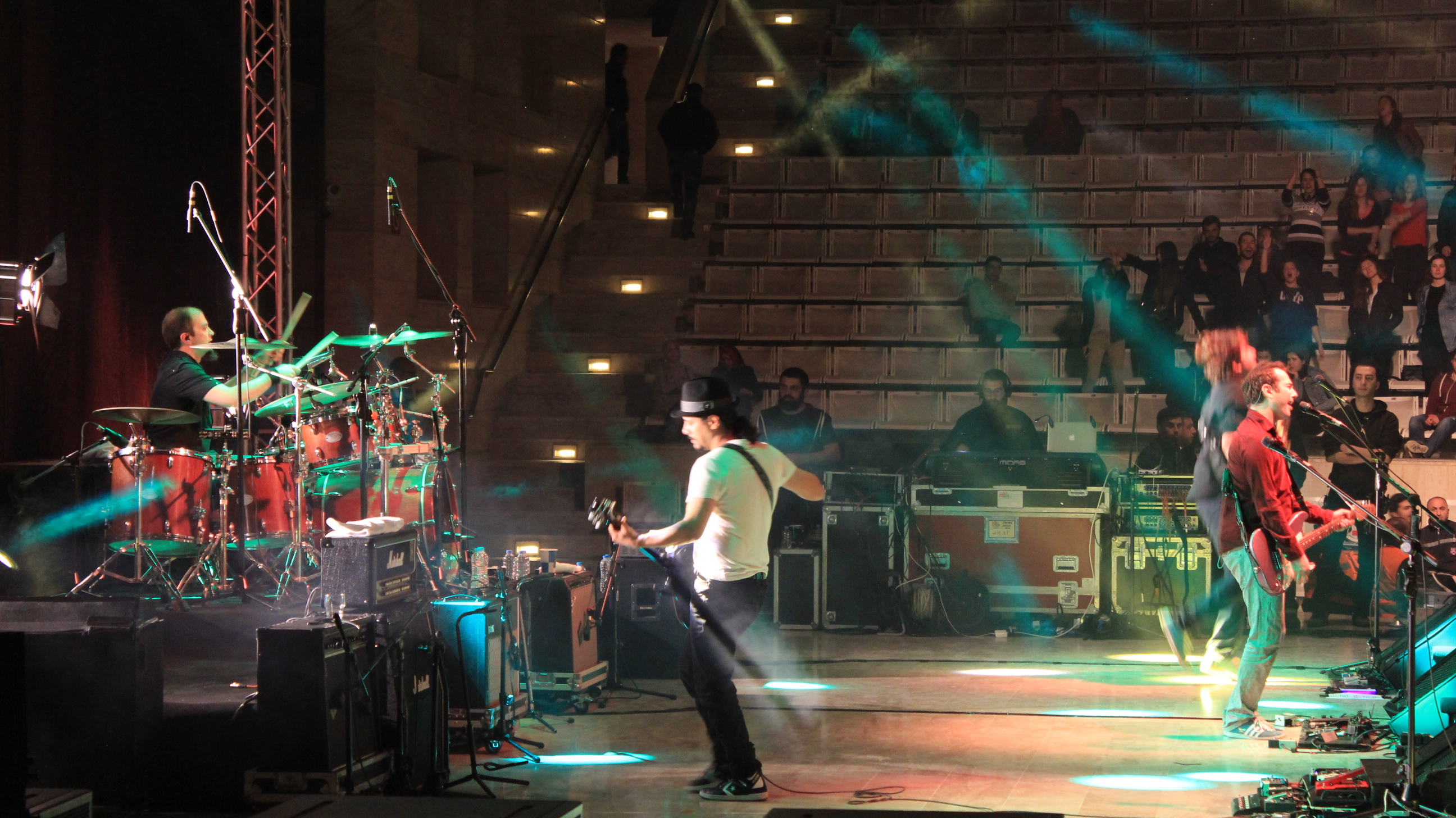
During their concert at Bilkent University Mayfest, 2015

In 2016, the band released the single "Anlatamıyorum", which came out with recording label DMC. The music video was shot together with director Serdar Ferit. Two sets were set up for shooting in Istanbul and Helsinki. On the 20th anniversary of the band's foundation, their cult album Dünya Yalan Söylüyor was, for the first time, introduced to fans on vinyl format.

On 21 January 2022 the band released their ninth album, entitled Sirenler (Sirens). Tamiri Mümkün, the film of the concert they held at Vodafone Park on 28 May 2022, was released on 13 January 2023.

== Discography ==
Studio albums

- Şehir (1996)
- Bırak Zaman Aksın (1999)
- Gül Kendine (2001)
- Dünya Yalan Söylüyor (2004)
- Büyük Düşler (2006)
- Başıbozuk (2008)
- Masumiyetin Ziyan Olmaz (2010)
- Güneşi Beklerken (2012)
- Sirenler (2022)
- Saygı1 (2025)

Live albums

- Harbiye Açıkhava (Canlı Senfonik) (2020)

Singles

- "Yaz" (2002)
- "Deli (Eurovision 08)" (2008)
- "Loveliest Mistake" (2010)
- "Sev Beni" (2011)
- "Anlatamıyorum" (2016)
- "Melekler Ölmez" (2016)
- "Sultan-ı Yegâh" (2018)
- "Forsa" (2021)
- "Dünyaya Bedel" (2021)
- "Yaz Yaz Yaz" (feat. Aleyna Tilki) (2023)

Podcasts

- "Nasıl Olunur" (2010)
- "Nasıl Gidiyor Karantina?" (2020)
- "Anormal Şartlar Altında" (2020)
- "Mümkün Podcast" (2023)

Awards and achievements
Preceded by Kenan Doğulu with "Shake It Up Şekerim"	Turkey in the Eurovision Song Contest; 2008	Succeeded by Hadise with "Düm Tek Tek"
