= Cyprus in the Eurovision Song Contest 2008 =

- Eurovision Song Contest 2008
- Participating broadcaster: Cyprus Broadcasting Corporation (CyBC)
- Country: Cyprus
- Selection process: A Song for Europe
- Selection date: 12 January 2008

Competing entry
- Song: "Femme Fatale"
- Artist: Evdokia Kadi
- Songwriters: Nikos Evagelou; Vangelis Evangelou

Placement
- Semi-final result: Failed to qualify (15th)

Participation chronology

Cyprus was represented at the Eurovision Song Contest 2008 with the song "Femme Fatale", composed by Nikos Evagelou, with lyrics by Vangelis Evangelou, and performed by Evdokia Kadi. The Cypriot participating broadcaster, the Cyprus Broadcasting Corporation (CyBC), organised the national final A Song for Europe in order to select its entry for the contest. The national final featured ten entries, resulting in the selection of "Femme Fatale" performed by Evdokia Kadi at the final on 12 January 2008.

Cyprus was drawn to compete in the second semi-final of the Eurovision Song Contest which took place on 22 May 2008. Performing during the show in position 17, "Femme Fatale" was not announced among the 10 qualifying entries of the second semi-final and therefore did not qualify to compete in the final. It was later revealed that Cyprus placed fifteenth out of the 19 participating countries in the semi-final with 36 points.

== Background ==
Prior to the 2008 contest, the Cyprus Broadcasting Corporation (CyBC) had participated in the Eurovision Song Contest representing Cyprus twenty-five times since its debut in 1981. Its best placing was fifth, achieved three times: in 1982 with the song "Mono i agapi" performed by Anna Vissi, in 1997 with "Mana mou" performed by Hara and Andreas Constantinou, and in 2004 with "Stronger Every Minute" performed by Lisa Andreas. Its least successful result was in 1986 when it placed last with the song "Tora zo" by Elpida, receiving only four points in total. Its worst finish in terms of points received, however, was in 1999 when it placed second to last with "Tha'nai erotas" by Marlain Angelidou, receiving only two points. In 2007, their entry "Comme ci, comme ça" performed by Evridiki failed to qualify to the final.

As part of its duties as participating broadcaster, CyBC organises the selection of its entry in the Eurovision Song Contest and broadcasts the event in the country. The broadcaster confirmed its intentions to participate at the 2008 contest on 28 September 2007. CyBC has used various methods to select its entry in the past, such as internal selections and televised national finals to choose the performer, song, or both to compete at Eurovision. The broadcaster selected the 2007 entry via an internal selection. However, it opted to organised a national final to select its entry for the 2008 contest.

== Before Eurovision ==
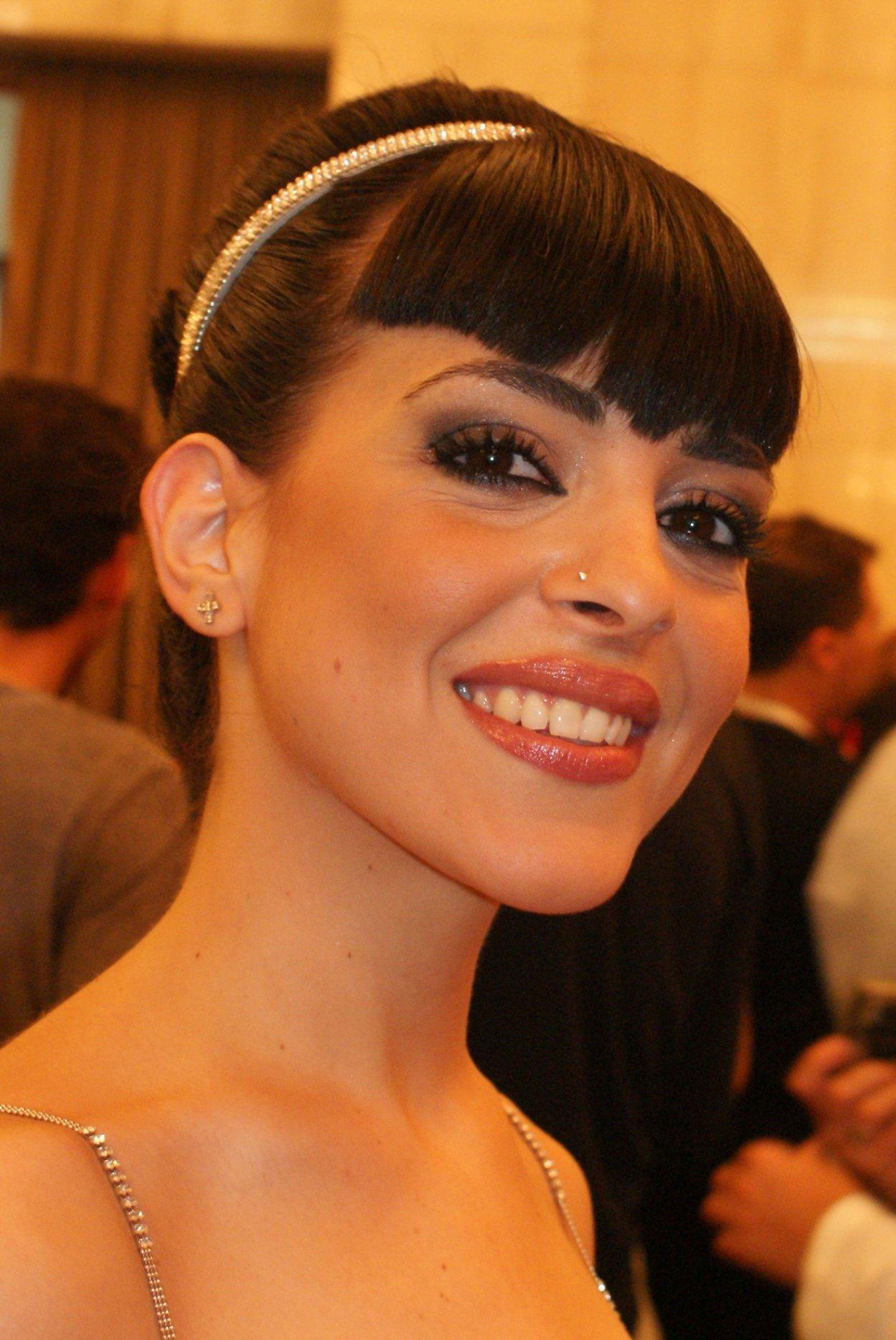
Evdokia Kadi won A Song for Europe and went on to represent Cyprus in the 2008 contest

=== A Song for Europe ===
A Song for Europe was the national final format developed by CyBC in order to select its entry for the Eurovision Song Contest 2008. The competition took place on 12 January 2008 at the CyBC Studio 3 in Nicosia, hosted by Andreas Ektoras and broadcast on RIK 1, RIK Sat, Trito Programma, London Greek Radio as well as online via the broadcaster's website cybc.cy and the official Eurovision Song Contest website eurovision.tv.

==== Competing entries ====
Artists and composers were able to submit their entries to the broadcaster between 29 September 2007 and 15 November 2007. All artists and songwriters were required to have Cypriot nationality, origin or residency as of 2007. At the conclusion of the deadline, 67 entries were received by CyBC. A seven-member selection committee selected 10 entries from the received submissions, which were announced on 8 December 2007. Among the competing artists was Marlain Angelidou, who represented Cyprus in 1999. Mike Connaris composed the Cypriot Eurovision entry in 2004.

Artist	Song	Songwriter(s)
Constantinos Andronikou	"Calling You"	Constantinos Andronikou
Eleni Skarpari	"Moments of Madness"	Mike Connaris
Elizabeth Anastasiou	"Sugar Mountain"	Michael Neophytou, Sotira Hadjipanagi
Evdokia Kadi	"Femme Fatale"	Nikos Evagelou, Vangelis Evangelou
Marlain Angelidou	"Rejection (Set Me Free)"	Marlain Angelidou
Mirto Meletiou	"Rescue Me"	Christodoulos Haralampides, Andreas Ikonomidi
Myria Pampori and Alexis Manison	"Turning to You"	Minas Pamporis
Nikolas Metaxas	"Butterfly"	Nikolas Metaxas
Nikolas Metaxas	"I Can't Be"	Nikolas Metaxas
Sofia Strati	"This Can't Be Love"	Giorgos Pellapashiotis

==== Final ====
The final took place on 12 January 2008. Ten entries competed and the winner, "Femme Fatale" performed by Evdokia Kadi, was selected by a combination of votes from a public televote (60%) and a nine-member jury panel (40%). The jury panel consisted of the seven members of the selection committee that selected the competing entries as well as two guest jurors. In addition to the performances of the competing entries, the show featured a guest performance by Evridiki (who represented Cyprus in 1992, 1994, and 2007) and Dimitris Korgialas.

Final – 12 January 2008
R/O	Artist	Song	Jury	Televote		Total	Place
R/O	Artist	Song	Jury	Votes	Points	Total	Place
1	Eleni Skarpari	"Moments of Madness"	16	1,644	18	34	7
2	Myria Pampori and Alexis Manison	"Turning to You"	8	2,850	48	56	4
3	Mirto Meletiou	"Rescue Me"	20	1,374	12	32	9
4	Sofia Strati	"This Can't Be Love"	12	2,285	42	54	5
5	Evdokia Kadi	"Femme Fatale"	32	6,279	72	104	1
6	Nikolas Metaxas	"I Can't Be"	40	3,994	60	100	2
7	Marlain Angelidou	"Rejection (Set Me Free)"	48	2,119	36	84	3
8	Nikolas Metaxas	"Butterfly"	24	2,076	30	54	6
9	Elizabeth Anastasiou	"Sugar Mountain"	4	2,048	24	28	10
10	Constantinos Andronikou	"Calling You"	28	1,342	6	34	8

=== Promotion ===
Evdokia Kadi specifically promoted "Femme Fatale" as the Cypriot Eurovision entry on 27 February 2008 by performing the song during the Greek Eurovision national final Ellinikós Telikós 2008.

== At Eurovision ==
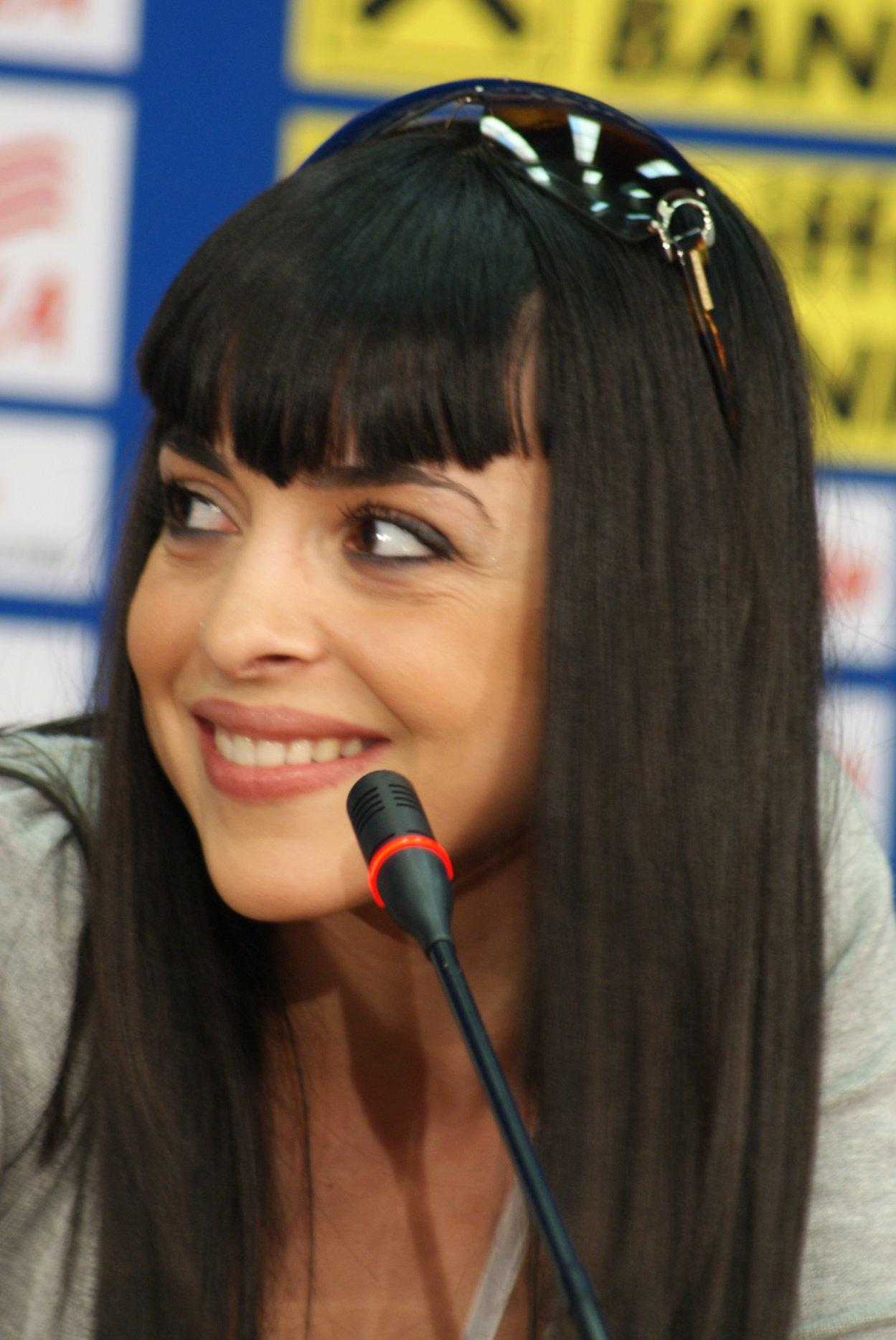
Evdokia Kadi during a press meet and greet

It was announced in September 2007 that the competition's format would be expanded to two semi-finals in 2008. According to Eurovision rules, all nations with the exceptions of the host country and the "Big Four" (France, Germany, Spain, and the United Kingdom) are required to qualify from one of two semi-finals in order to compete for the final; the top nine songs from each semi-final as determined by televoting progress to the final, and a tenth was determined by back-up juries. The European Broadcasting Union (EBU) split up the competing countries into six different pots based on voting patterns from previous contests, with countries with favourable voting histories put into the same pot. On 28 January 2008, a special allocation draw was held which placed each country into one of the two semi-finals. Cyprus was placed into the second semi-final, to be held on 22 May 2008. The running order for the semi-finals was decided through another draw on 17 March 2008 and Cyprus was set to perform in position 17, following the entry from Malta and before the entry from Macedonia.

The two semi-finals and the final were broadcast in Cyprus on RIK 1 and RIK SAT with commentary by Melina Karageorgiou. CyBC appointed Hristina Marouhou as its spokesperson to announce the Cypriot votes during the final.

=== Semi-final ===
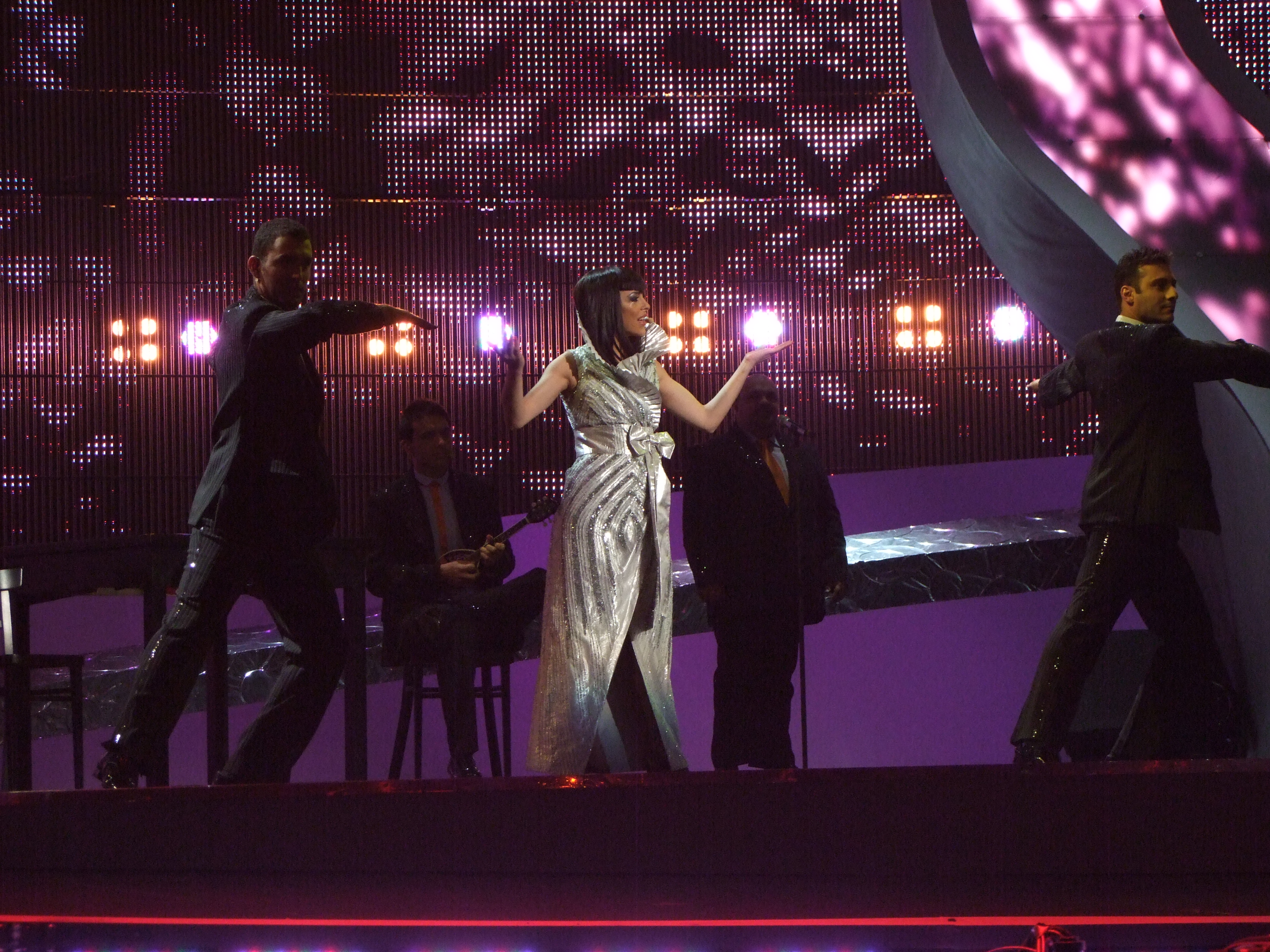
Evdokia Kadi during a rehearsal before the second semi-final

Evdokia Kadi took part in technical rehearsals on 14 and 18 May, followed by dress rehearsals on 21 and 22 May. The Cypriot performance featured Kadi wearing a high-collared silver dress that was removed to reveal a short orange and black dress, joined by four backing vocalists dressed in black suits. The performance featured Kadi performing on and around a black dining table, which was popped up to reveal a red tablecloth towards the end of the song, on which Kadi sat on while the backing vocalists lifted the table and carried it around. The backing vocalists that joined Kadi on stage were Andreas Vanezis, Christos Shakallis, Polys Kourousides and Tefkros Neokleous. An additional backing vocalist, Pavlos Gregoras, was featured for the performance.

At the end of the show, Cyprus was not announced among the top 10 entries in the second semi-final and therefore failed to qualify to compete in the final. It was later revealed that Cyprus placed fifteenth in the semi-final, receiving a total of 36 points.

=== Voting ===
Below is a breakdown of points awarded to Cyprus and awarded by Cyprus in the second semi-final and grand final of the contest. The nation awarded its 12 points to Georgia in the semi-final and to Greece in the final of the contest.

==== Points awarded to Cyprus ====
Points awarded to Cyprus (Semi-final 2)
Score	Country
12 points	United Kingdom
10 points	
8 points	Bulgaria
7 points	
6 points	
5 points	Hungary
4 points	Turkey
3 points	
2 points	Albania; Georgia; Switzerland
1 point	Serbia

==== Points awarded by Cyprus ====
Points awarded by Cyprus (Semi-final 2)
Score	Country
12 points	Georgia
10 points	Ukraine
8 points	Bulgaria
7 points	Switzerland
6 points	Croatia
5 points	Denmark
4 points	Sweden
3 points	Portugal
2 points	Belarus
1 point	Iceland

Points awarded by Cyprus (Final)
Score	Country
12 points	Greece
10 points	Armenia
8 points	Russia
7 points	Georgia
6 points	Ukraine
5 points	Serbia
4 points	Spain
3 points	Romania
2 points	Israel
1 point	Sweden
