= Sopho Khalvashi =

Georgian singer (born 1986)

Sopho Khalvashi სოფო ხალვაში
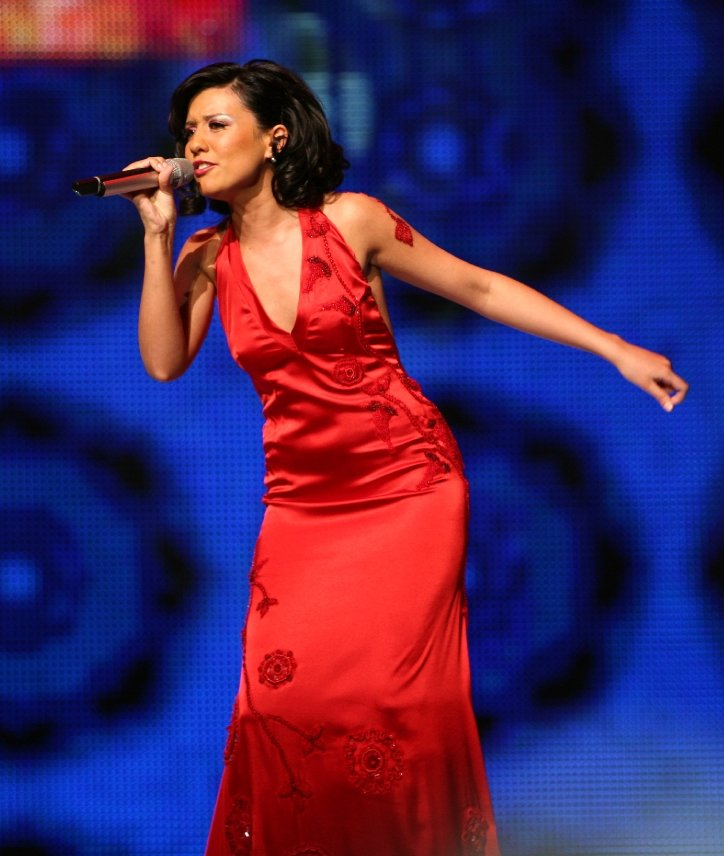
- Khalvashi performing at the Eurovision Song Contest finals

Background information
- Born: Sopho Khalvashi; 31 May 1986 (age 40); Batumi, Adjarian ASSR, Georgian SSR, Soviet Union
- Origin: Batumi
- Genres: electronic, pop
- Occupation: Singer
- Instrument: Vocals
- Years active: 2004 - present

Sopho Khalvashi (Georgian: სოფო ხალვაში [sopʰo χalvaʃi]; born 31 May 1986), sometimes known as simply Sopho, is a Georgian singer of Laz heritage. She represented her home nation at the Eurovision Song Contest 2007 with the song Visionary Dream, which was Georgia's first entry into the contest.

== Career ==
Khalvashi claimed third prize at the commercial song contest "New Wave" 2006 in Jūrmala, Latvia. She then signed a contract with Russian management agency "ARS" led by Russian composer Igor Krutoy. She returned to her homeland, where she received an offer from the Imedi TV channel to host local talent show On Imedi's Waves.

It was announced on 12 December 2006 that she would represent her home nation at the Eurovision Song Contest 2007, marking the country's debut at the event. Her competing song was "Visionary Dream", originally called "My Story". In the semi-final on 10 May 2007, she finished eighth; as one of the top 10 qualifiers she secured a spot for Georgia in the final. In the final on 12 May 2007, she finished 12th, earning maximum points from one country, Lithuania.

In November 2018, Khalvashi was appointed Deputy Mayor of her home city of Batumi.

In 2024, she announced the Georgian jury results in the grand final of Eurovision Song Contest 2024.

== Personal life ==
Sopho Khalvashi is married to Mikheil Dzodzuashvili, son of Georgian football manager and former player Revaz Dzodzuashvili. Together they have two daughters.

Awards and achievements
Preceded by None (first time entry)	Georgia in the Eurovision Song Contest; 2007	Succeeded by Diana Gurtskaya with "Peace Will Come"
