= Kerem Kabadayı =

Turkish writer and musician (born 1977)

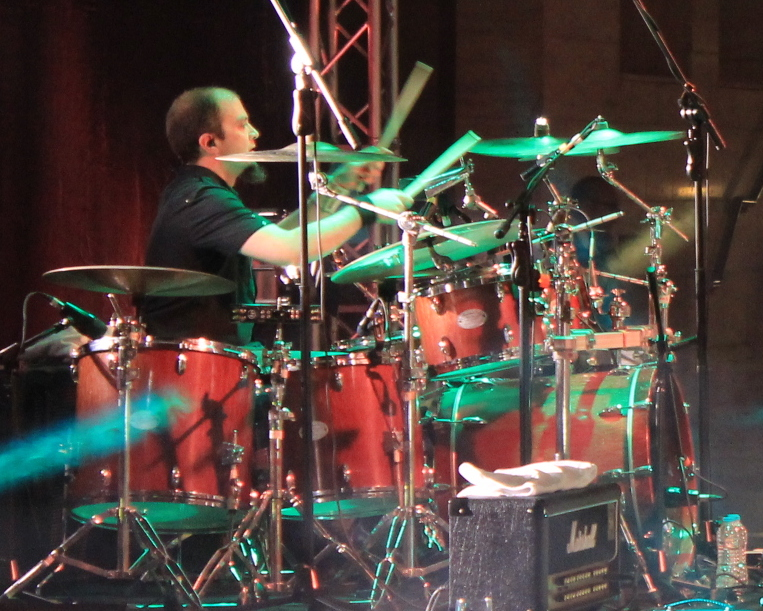
- Kadabayı in 2015

Background information
- Born: 20 December 1977 (age 48); Ankara, Turkey
- Genres: Alternative rock
- Occupation: Musician
- Instrument: drums.
- Label: Rakun
- Website: morveotesi.com sandino.deviantart.com

Kerem Kabadayı (born 20 December 1977) is a Turkish writer and musician (drummer). He is a founding member of the Turkish rock band Mor ve Ötesi.

== Biography ==
He was born on 20 December 1977 in Ankara, Turkey, to Ülkü (Yulku) Kabadayı and his wife Müjde.

=== Education ===
From 1983 to 1988, Kerem studied at the Bahariye Primary School (Bahariye İlkokulu), and from 1988 to 1996 he studied at the private German Lycée in Istanbul, where he met Harun Tekin. In 2000, he graduated from Koç University's Faculty of Production. Between 2001 and 2004, Kerem continued his study at the Department of History of Architecture, Urban and Contemporary Art of the Boğaziçi University. He graduated with his work "Capitalist Urbanization in Turkey Between 1920 and Early 1990s: an Alternative Interpretation", which is mainly based on Structuralist-Marxist theories of urbanization and history.

In the time between 2000 and 2004, he worked as a lecturer at the Faculty of Science and Literature of Koç Üniversity. After resigning from the job, he began teaching at the postgraduate program in History of Architecture at the Istanbul Technical University.

=== Creative activity ===
Literature

Kerem's first article was published in the Journal of Computer Technology "Amiga Dünyası" in 1992, but that same year the magazine shut down. Since 2003, Kabadayı has been writing in the journal "Asklepios" (Journal of Medicine).

Music

Kabadayı started playing drums in 1990, later taking lessons from the drummer of the Turkish rock band Whisky - Alpay ŞALT. He helped to found the group "Decision", along with Şahin Yalabık (vocals), Harun Tekin (guitar), Derin Esmer (guitar), and Alper Tekin (bass), playing together until 1994. After Şahin Yalabık left the group, Kabadayı decided to compose only with Turkish lyrics. In 1995, he co-founded the group Mor ve Ötesi ("Violet and Beyond"); their first album, Şehir, was published in 1996. Kabadayı wrote four of the songs on the album: Sabahın Köründe, Uyku, Past and Reality, with Uyku being the first in Turkish.
