= Harun Tekin (musician) =

Turkish singer, musician, and poet (born 1977)

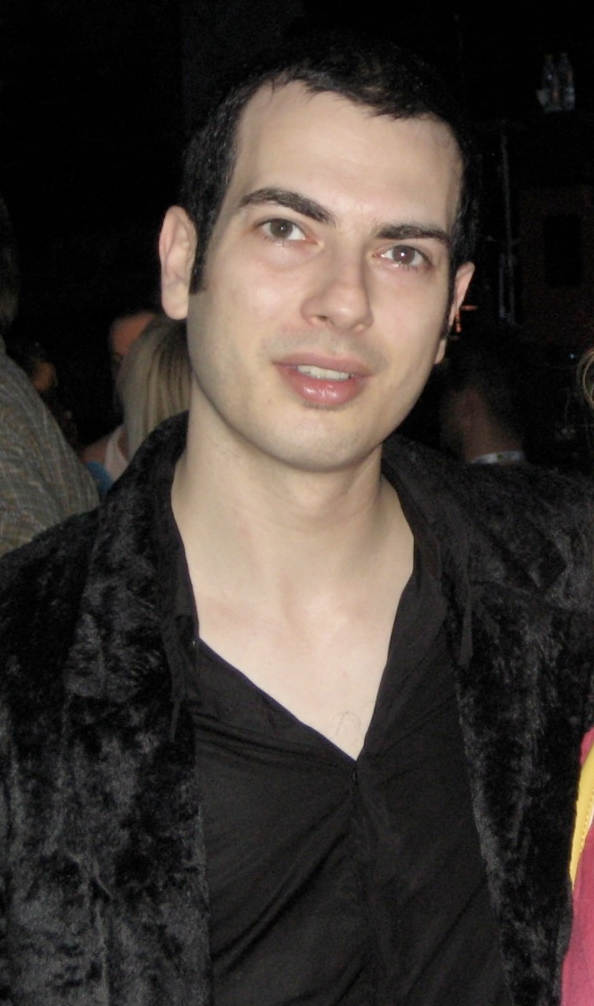
- Tekin in 2008

Background information
- Born: Sami Harun Tekin; 28 June 1977 (age 49); Ankara, Turkey
- Genre: Alternative rock
- Occupation: Musician
- Instruments: Guitar, piano, vocals
- Years active: 1990–present
- Label: Rakun
- Member of: mor ve ötesi

Sami Harun Tekin (born 28 June 1977) is a Turkish singer, musician, and poet. He is one of the founding members and the vocalist of the Turkish rock band Mor ve Ötesi.

== Biography ==
In 1988, while being a student at German High School in Istanbul, Harun met Kerem Kabadayı with whom he would later establish his first band.

In 1996, Harun started his BSc studies at Boğaziçi University, and graduated as a philosophy major in 2001.

Following the 1999 earthquake in Turkey, he joined Açık Radio to work at Earthquake Communication Centre.

In September 2008, he has appeared on television in Kısa Devre on the Turkish channel Habertürk, together with the psychiatrist Cem Mumcu and actress Pelin Batu.

In September 2010, he made his first television appearance as an actor as he appeared in two episodes of one of the most popular TV-Series in Turkey: Behzat Ç. Bir Ankara Polisiyesi.

Tekin is interested in philosophy, politics, and football. He is also a big fan of Radiohead.

As of 2014, he is in a relationship with actress Melisa Sözen.

== Creative activity ==
In 1990, Tekin, together with his school friend Kerem Kabadayı founded a group «Decision». Other members were Şahin Yalabık (vocals), Alper Tekin (bass guitar). When in 1991 the group moved to a rock sound, Harun started playing the guitar. Later, they were joined by Derin Esmer (guitar). After Yalabık left the group, the musicians decided to move to Turkish lyrics, and founded in 1995 the group of Mor ve Ötesi (literally Purple and Beyond; a play on the word morötesi, meaning ultraviolet). In the new group, Tekin shared the role of soloist with Derin Esmer, but after the latter's retirement in 1999, Tekin became the only vocalist. He and Burak Güven are the main writers of the group.

In 2007, he performed the soundtrack for the film director Veli Çelik's Kayıp. In 2008, he performed a song "İstasyon İnsanları" from the album of Teoman Söz Müzik Teoman.

== Filmography ==
- Behzat Ç. Bir Ankara Polisiyesi (2010) - Berna's boyfriend (Episode 1)
