= Andorra in the Eurovision Song Contest 2008 =

- Eurovision Song Contest 2008
- Participating broadcaster: Ràdio i Televisió d'Andorra (RTVA)
- Country: Andorra
- Selection process: Internal selection
- Announcement date: Artist: 7 December 2007; Song: 26 February 2008

Competing entry
- Song: "Casanova"
- Artist: Gisela
- Songwriters: Jordi Cubino and Dominic McDonough

Placement
- Semi-final result: Failed to qualify (16th)

Participation chronology

Andorra was represented at the Eurovision Song Contest 2008 with the song "Casanova", written by Jordi Cubino, and performed by Gisela. The Andorran participating broadcaster, Ràdio i Televisió d'Andorra (RTVA), internally selected its entry for the contest. The song, "Casanova", was presented to the public on 26 February 2008.

Andorra was drawn to compete in the first semi-final of the Eurovision Song Contest which took place on 20 May 2008. Performing during the show in position 12, "Casanova" was not announced among the 10 qualifying entries of the first semi-final and therefore did not qualify to compete in the final. It was later revealed that Andorra placed sixteenth out of the 19 participating countries in the semi-final with 22 points.

== Background ==
Prior to the 2008 contest, Ràdio i Televisió d'Andorra (RTVA) had participated in the Eurovision Song Contest representing Andorra four times since its first entry in 2004. To this point, it had yet to feature in a final, with its best result being in 2007 with the song "Salvem el món" performed by Anonymous which placed twelfth out of the 28 entries in the semi-final, while their worst result was achieved in 2006 where it placed twenty-third (last) out of the 23 entries in the semi-final with the song "Sense tu" by Jenny.

As part of its duties as participating broadcaster, RTVA organises the selection of its entry in the Eurovision Song Contest and broadcasts the event in the country. The broadcaster confirmed its intentions to participate at the 2008 contest on 6 November 2007. In 2004 and 2005, RTVA had set up a national final in order to select its entry for the contest. In 2006 and 2007, the broadcaster opted for an internal selection to select both the artist and song, a method which was continued for their 2008 entry.

== Before Eurovision ==
=== Internal selection ===
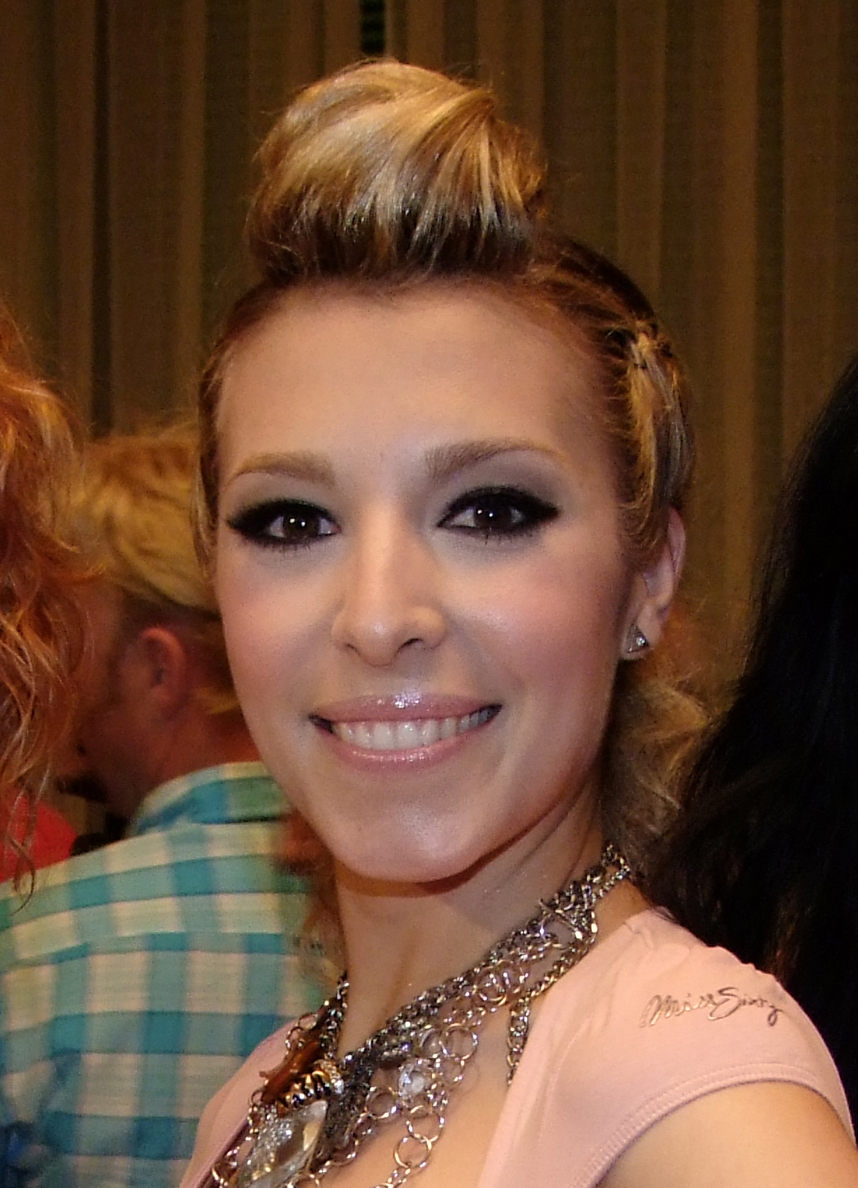
Gisela was internally selected to represent Andorra in 2008

RTVA selected its entry for the 2008 Eurovision Song Contest through an internal selection. On 6 November 2007, Andorran newspaper Diari d' Andorra reported that Spanish singer Gisela, who previously participated in the first season of the Spanish reality television talent show Operación Triunfo placing eighth, had been selected to represent Andorra in Belgrade after the broadcaster approached her record company Filmax Music. While the singer's management initially stated that an agreement had yet to be made, Gisela was confirmed by RTVA as the Andorran entrant on 7 December 2007. The internal selection process was criticised by the vice president of the Association of Andorran Musicians (ASMA), Oriol Vilella, who believed that abandoning an open selection process in favor of cooperating with a private company would prevent equal opportunities for all Andorran artists.

During a press conference in Andorra la Vella on 10 December 2007, RTVA revealed that Gisela would perform the song "Casanova" at the Eurovision Song Contest, which was written by Jordi Cubino. "Casanova" was presented to the public during a press conference that took place at the Buda Espai Andorra venue in Andorra la Vella on 26 February 2008, while its official music video, produced by Sony Music, was released on 27 February 2008. The Department of Tourism of the Andorran Government pledged €31,000 for the production of the video.

=== Promotion ===
Gisela made several appearances across Europe to specifically promote "Casanova" as the Andorran Eurovision entry. On 28 March, Gisela performed "Casanova" during the show ArusCity which was broadcast on Catalan broadcasters 8TV and TeleTaxi. Gisela also took part in promotional activities in Greece which included appearances during the Alpha TV morning show Kafes me tin Eleni and the ANT1 show Proinos Kafes on 8 April. On 12 April, a special show entitled Vull escoltar que tu m'estimes was broadcast on Catalan broadcaster TV3 that covered Gisela's preparations for Eurovision.

== At Eurovision ==
It was announced in September 2007 that the competition's format would be expanded to two semi-finals in 2008. According to the rules, all nations with the exceptions of the host country and the "Big Four" (France, Germany, Spain and the United Kingdom) are required to qualify from one of two semi-finals in order to compete for the final; the top nine songs from each semi-final as determined by televoting progress to the final, and a tenth was determined by back-up juries. The European Broadcasting Union (EBU) split up the competing countries into six different pots based on voting patterns from previous contests, with countries with favourable voting histories put into the same pot. On 28 January 2008, a special allocation draw was held which placed each country into one of the two semi-finals. Andorra was placed into the first semi-final, to be held on 20 May 2008. The running order for the semi-finals was decided through another draw on 17 March 2008 and Andorra was set to perform in position 12, following the entry from Ireland and before the entry from Bosnia and Herzegovina.

The two semi-finals and the final were broadcast in Andorra on ATV with commentary by Meri Picart and Josep Lluís Trabal. RTVA appointed Alfred Llahí as its spokesperson to announce the Andorran votes during the final.

=== Semi-final ===
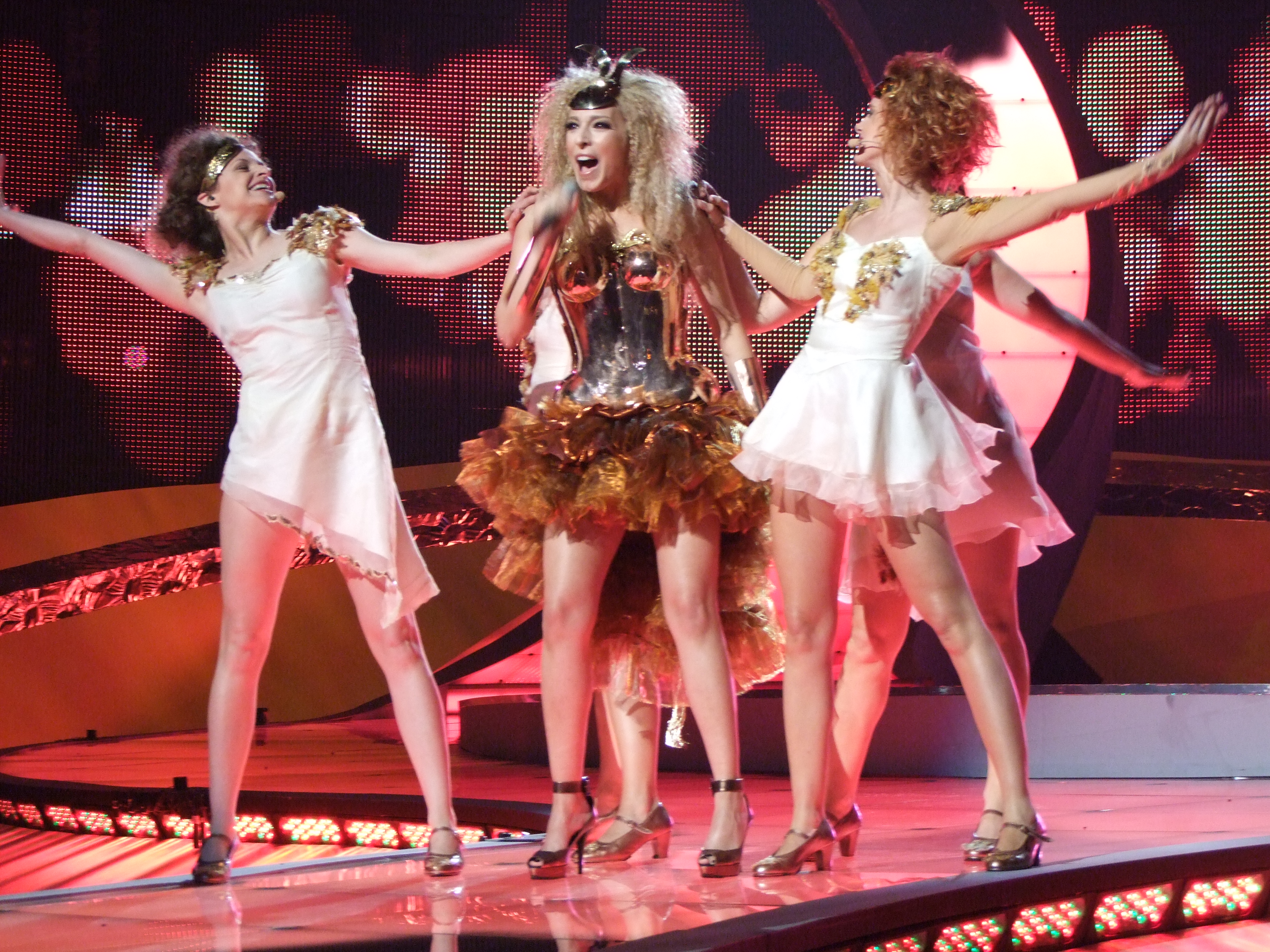
Gisela during a rehearsal before the first semi-final

Gisela took part in technical rehearsals on 13 and 15 May, followed by dress rehearsals on 19 and 20 May. The Andorran performance featured Gisela dressed in a metallic outfit and headdress, joined on stage by four dancers which also provided backing vocals. The performers moved around the stage, which included the catwalk, throughout the performance and together did a routine choreographed by José Cruz. The LED screens displayed red and yellow colours. Among the four backing performers that joined Gisela was Belinda Sánchez Leal.

At the end of the show, Andorra was not announced among the top 10 entries in the first semi-final and therefore failed to qualify to compete in the final. It was later revealed that Andorra placed sixteenth in the semi-final, receiving a total of 22 points.

=== Voting ===
Below is a breakdown of points awarded to Andorra and awarded by Andorra in the first semi-final and grand final of the contest. The nation awarded its 12 points to Finland in the semi-final and to Spain in the final of the contest.

==== Points awarded to Andorra ====
Points awarded to Andorra (Semi-final 1)
Score	Country
12 points	Spain
10 points	
8 points	
7 points	
6 points	
5 points	
4 points	Israel
3 points	Estonia
2 points	
1 point	Ireland; Poland; Slovenia

==== Points awarded by Andorra ====
Points awarded by Andorra (Semi-final 1)
Score	Country
12 points	Finland
10 points	Norway
8 points	Azerbaijan
7 points	Israel
6 points	Romania
5 points	Greece
4 points	Russia
3 points	Armenia
2 points	San Marino
1 point	Moldova

Points awarded by Andorra (Final)
Score	Country
12 points	Spain
10 points	Portugal
8 points	Greece
7 points	Azerbaijan
6 points	Ukraine
5 points	Russia
4 points	Finland
3 points	France
2 points	Latvia
1 point	Norway
