= France in the Eurovision Song Contest 2008 =

- Eurovision Song Contest 2008
- Participating broadcaster: France Télévisions
- Country: France
- Selection process: Internal selection
- Announcement date: 7 March 2008

Competing entry
- Song: "Divine"
- Artist: Sébastien Tellier
- Songwriters: Sébastien Tellier; Amandine de La Richardière

Placement
- Final result: 19th, 47 points

Participation chronology

France was represented at the Eurovision Song Contest 2008 with the song "Divine", written by Sébastien Tellier and Amandine de la Richardière, and performed by Tellier himself. The French participating broadcaster, France Télévisions, internally selected its entry for the contest. "Divine" was officially announced by France 3 as the French entry on 7 March 2008 and later the song was presented to the public on 18 March 2008 during the M6 programme T'empêches tout le monde de dormir.

As a member of the "Big Four", France automatically qualified to compete in the final of the Eurovision Song Contest. Performing in position 19, France placed nineteenth out of the 25 participating countries with 47 points.

== Background ==
Prior to the 2008 Contest, France Télévisions and its predecessor national broadcasters, have participated in the Eurovision Song Contest representing France fifty times RTF's debut in 1956. They first won the contest in 1958 with "Dors, mon amour" performed by André Claveau. In the 1960s, they won three times, with "Tom Pillibi" performed by Jacqueline Boyer in 1960, "Un premier amour" performed by Isabelle Aubret in 1962, and "Un jour, un enfant" performed by Frida Boccara, who won in 1969 in a four-way tie with the Netherlands, Spain, and the United Kingdom. Their fifth – and so far latest – victory came in 1977 with "L'oiseau et l'enfant" performed by Marie Myriam. They has also finished second four times, with Paule Desjardins in 1957, Catherine Ferry in 1976, Joëlle Ursull in 1990, and Amina in 1991 (who lost out to Sweden's Carola in a tie-break). In the 21st century, France has had less success, only making the top ten two times, with "Je n'ai que mon âme" performed by Natasha St-Pier finishing fourth in 2001 and "Il faut du temps" by Sandrine François finishing fifth in 2002. In 2007, they finished in twenty-second place with the song "L'amour à la française" performed by les Fatals Picards.

As part of its duties as participating broadcaster, France Télévisions organises the selection of its entry in the Eurovision Song Contest and broadcasts the event in the country. The broadcaster confirmed that it would participate in the 2008 contest on 27 November 2007. The French broadcasters had used both national finals and internal selection to choose their entries in the past. The French entries from 2005 to 2007 were selected via a national final that featured several competing acts. In 2008, the broadcaster opted to internally select its entry.

== Before Eurovision ==
=== Internal selection ===
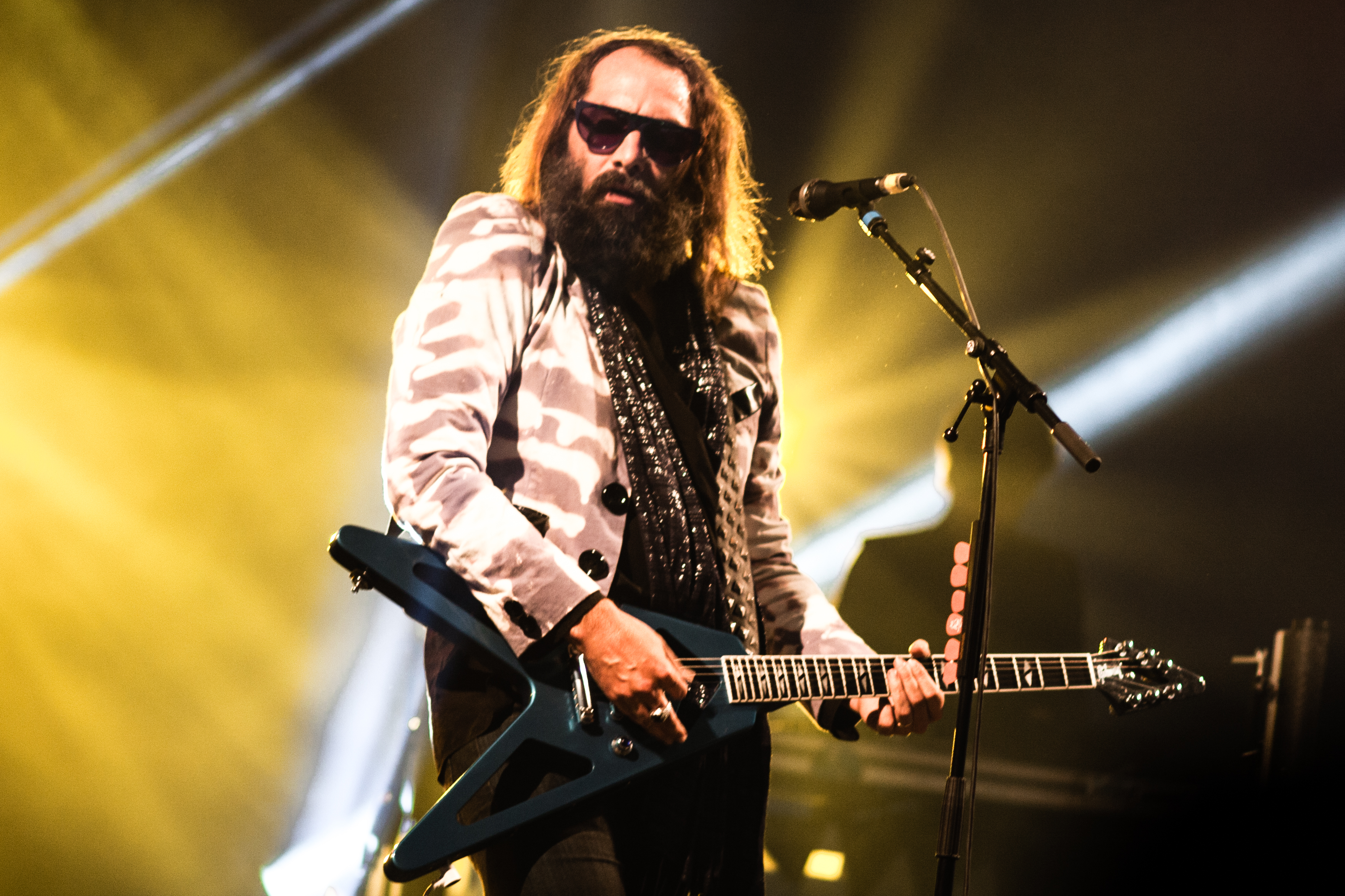
Sébastien Tellier was internally selected to represent France in the Eurovision Song Contest 2008

France 3 announced in early 2008 that the French entry for the Eurovision Song Contest 2008 would be selected internally. The organisation of the internal selection was headed by the French Head of Delegation for the Eurovision Song Contest Bruno Berberes. On 7 March 2008, France 3 announced that the French entry for the Eurovision Song Contest 2008 would be "Divine" performed by Sébastien Tellier. The song was written by Sébastien Tellier and Amandine de la Richardière and had already been released as a single from Tellier's recent album Sexuality, which was released on 25 February 2008. Among the other artists considered by France 3 before the broadcaster finalised their decision internally included Philippe Katerine. "Divine" was edited and remixed at the request of the French broadcaster, and the entry was formally presented to the public on 18 March 2008 during the M6 programme T'empêches tout le monde de dormir, hosted by Marc-Olivier Fogiel.

=== Controversy ===
The announcement of "Divine" as the French entry garnered controversy as it did not feature any French language lyrics. On 15 March 2008, member of French Parliament from the UMP Party, François-Michel Gonnot, stated that the French broadcaster "is giving up defending its language in front of hundreds of millions of television viewers around the world", which was further supported by French Secretary of State for Cooperation and Francophony Alain Joyandet who issued a statement pledging Tellier to "honor the French language" as "when one has the honour of being selected to represent France, one sings in French".

In response to the public criticism, Sébastien Tellier's producer Marc Teissier du Cros disagreed that "singing in French is the best way to make oneself understood by the whole world" as "half the Eurovision candidates [in the 2008 contest] are singing in English". Tellier also responded in an interview with RTL Radio that attempts would be made to include more French lyrics, as well as revealing that he would have written a song entirely in French if he had been asked by France 3 to write a song specifically for Eurovision instead of selecting his contest entry from his album. Eventually, the edited version of "Divine" included additional lyrics in French.

== At Eurovision ==
It was announced in September 2007 that the competition's format would be expanded to two semi-finals in 2008. According to the rules, all nations with the exceptions of the host country and the "Big Four" (France, Germany, Spain, and the United Kingdom) are required to qualify from one of two semi-finals in order to compete for the final; the top nine songs from each semi-final as determined by televoting progress to the final, and a tenth was determined by back-up juries. As a member of the "Big 4", France automatically qualified to compete in the final on 24 May 2008. In addition to their participation in the final, France is also required to broadcast and vote in one of the two semi-finals. During the semi-final allocation draw on 24 January 2008, France was assigned to broadcast and vote in the second semi-final on 22 May 2008.

In France, the second semi-final was broadcast on France 4 with commentary by Peggy Olmi and Yann Renoard, while the final was broadcast live on France 3 with commentary by Jean-Paul Gaultier and Julien Lepers, as well as via radio on France Bleu with commentary by François Kevorkian. France Télévisions appointed Cyril Hanouna as its spokesperson to announce the French votes during the final.

=== Final ===
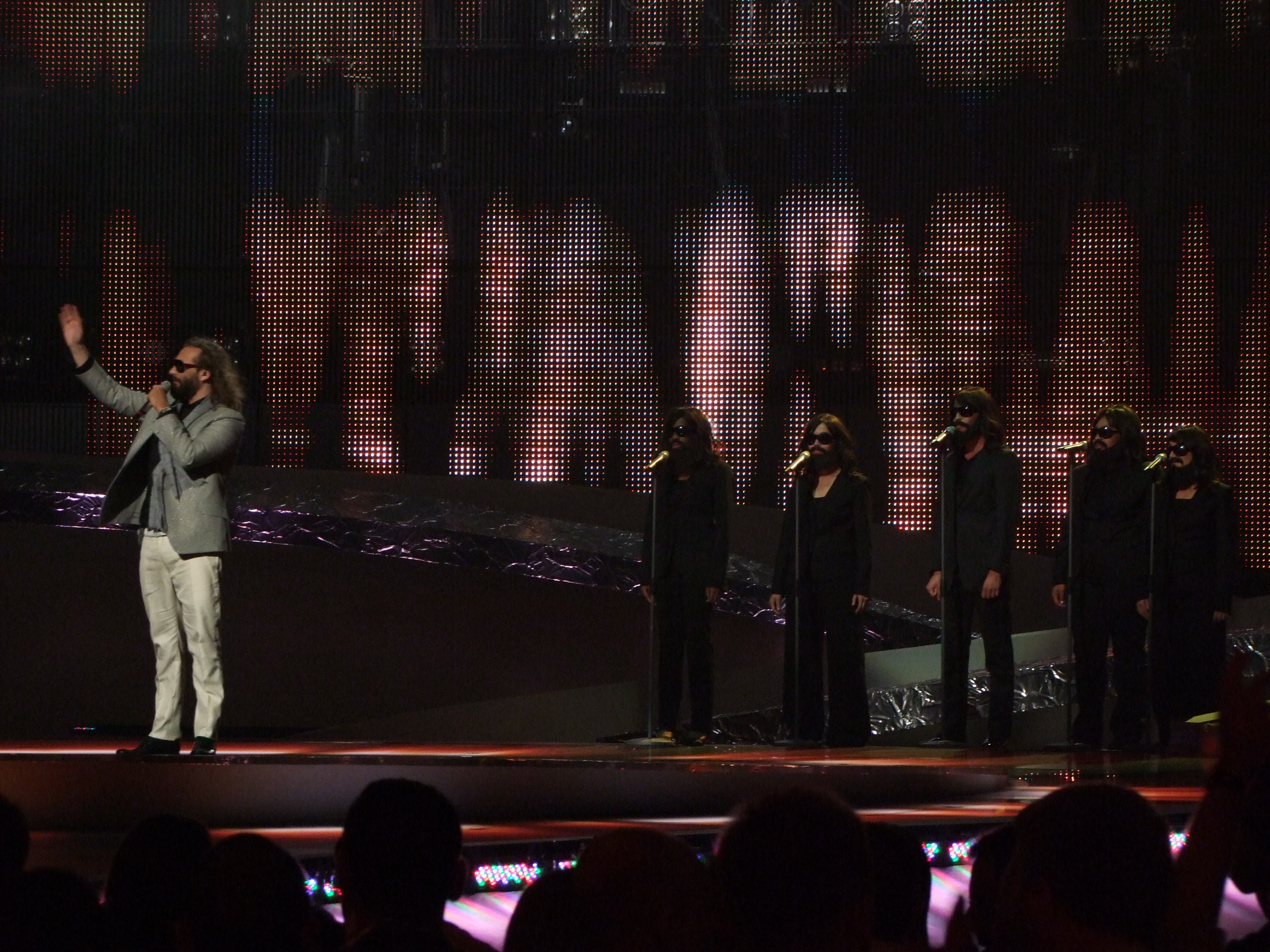
Sébastien Tellier during a rehearsal before the final

Sébastien Tellier took part in technical rehearsals on 17 and 18 May, followed by dress rehearsals on 23 and 24 May. The running order for the semi-finals and final was decided by through another draw on 17 March 2008 and France was subsequently placed to perform in position 19, following the entry from Ukraine and before the entry from Azerbaijan.

The French performance featured Sébastien Tellier on stage dressed in a suit with a black shirt and wearing black sunglasses, joined by five backing vocalists wearing sunglasses, wigs and fake facial hair which resembled Tellier: Abigael Debit, Falone Tayoung, Marie Djemali, Sheliyah Masry and Stanislas Debit. The performance began with Tellier entering the stage driving a small golf buggy branded with the French Tricolour and carrying a helium filled inflatable globe that he later inhaled from, causing his voice to become higher-pitched. The stage colours were predominately green and orange and the LED screens displayed warm colours, which turned into a sea where the image of a black sun rose above. France placed nineteenth in the final, scoring 47 points.

In a 2026 interview with British radio presenter Jo Whiley on BBC Radio 2 Tellier claimed that his intention was to crash the golf buggy into the stage, but was prevented from doing so by EBU officials due to safety concerns.

=== Voting ===
Below is a breakdown of points awarded to France and awarded by France in the second semi-final and grand final of the contest. The nation awarded its 12 points to Portugal in the semi-final and to Armenia in the final of the contest.

==== Points awarded to France ====
Points awarded to France (Final)
| Score | Country |
|---|---|
| 12 points | |
| 10 points | |
| 8 points | Iceland; Lithuania |
| 7 points | |
| 6 points | Estonia |
| 5 points | Denmark |
| 4 points | Armenia; Sweden |
| 3 points | Andorra; Latvia |
| 2 points | Finland; United Kingdom |
| 1 point | Norway; Poland |

==== Points awarded by France ====
Points awarded by France (Semi-final 2)
| Score | Country |
|---|---|
| 12 points | Portugal |
| 10 points | Turkey |
| 8 points | Iceland |
| 7 points | Switzerland |
| 6 points | Bulgaria |
| 5 points | Albania |
| 4 points | Denmark |
| 3 points | Ukraine |
| 2 points | Croatia |
| 1 point | Sweden |

Points awarded by France (Final)
| Score | Country |
|---|---|
| 12 points | Armenia |
| 10 points | Turkey |
| 8 points | Portugal |
| 7 points | Serbia |
| 6 points | Israel |
| 5 points | Spain |
| 4 points | Romania |
| 3 points | Greece |
| 2 points | Bosnia and Herzegovina |
| 1 point | Russia |
