= Ukraine in the Eurovision Song Contest 2008 =

- Eurovision Song Contest 2008
- Participating broadcaster: National Television Company of Ukraine (NTU)
- Country: Ukraine
- Selection process: Artist: Internal selection Song: Yevrobachennia 2008 – Natsionalnyi vidbir
- Selection date: Artist: 21 December 2007; Song: 23 February 2008

Competing entry
- Song: "Shady Lady"
- Artist: Ani Lorak
- Songwriters: Karen Kavaleryan; Philipp Kirkorov; Dimitris Kontopoulos

Placement
- Semi-final result: Qualified (1st, 152 points)
- Final result: 2nd, 230 points

Participation chronology

Ukraine was represented at the Eurovision Song Contest 2008 with the song "Shady Lady", written by Karen Kavaleryan, Philip Kirkorov, and Dimitris Kontopoulos, and performed by Ani Lorak. The Ukrainian participating broadcaster, the National Television Company of Ukraine (NTU), organised a national final in order to select its entry for the contest, after having previously selected the performer internally. Lorak was internally selected in December 2007, while her song was selected through a national final held on 23 February 2008. Five songs competed in the national selection and "Shady Lady" was selected as the winning song following the combination of votes from a four-member jury panel and a public televote.

Ukraine was drawn to compete in the second semi-final of the Eurovision Song Contest which took place on 22 May 2008. Performing during the show in position 4, "Shady Lady" was announced among the 10 qualifying entries of the second semi-final and therefore qualified to compete in the final on 24 May. It was later revealed that Ukraine placed first out of the 19 participating countries in the semi-final with 152 points. In the final, Ukraine performed in position 18 and placed second out of the 25 participating countries with 230 points.

== Background ==
Prior to the 2008 contest, the National Television Company of Ukraine (NTU) had participated in the Eurovision Song Contest representing Ukraine five times since its first entry in 2003, winning the contest in 2004 with the song "Wild Dances" performed by Ruslana. Following the introduction of semi-finals for the 2004 contest, it had managed to qualify to final in every contest they participated in thus far. It had been the runner-up in the contest in 2007 with the song "Dancing Lasha Tumbai" performed by Verka Serduchka. Its least successful result had been 19th place, achieved in 2005, with the song "Razom nas bahato" performed by GreenJolly.

As part of its duties as participating broadcaster, NTU organises the selection of its entry in the Eurovision Song Contest and broadcasts the event in the country. The broadcaster confirmed its intentions to participate at the 2008 contest on 21 December 2007. In the past, NTU had alternated between both internal selections and national finals in order to select its entry. Between 2005 and 2007, NTU had set up national finals with several artists to choose both the song and performer, with both the public and a panel of jury members involved in the selection. The broadcaster internally selected the artist for the 2008 contest, while a national final was also organised to select the song.

== Before Eurovision ==
=== Artist selection ===
On 21 December 2007, NTU announced that they had internally selected Ani Lorak to represent Ukraine in Belgrade. Lorak previously attempted to represent Ukraine at the Eurovision Song Contest in 2005, placing second in the national final with the song "A Little Shot of Love". On 25 December 2007, NTU announced that they would organise a national final to select her song.

=== Yevrobachennia 2008 – Natsionalnyi vidbir ===
Composers had the opportunity to submit their songs between 25 December 2007 and 5 February 2008. A seven-member selection panel consisted of Eduard Klim (CEO of Lavina Music), Vitaliy Dokalenko (President of NTU), Oleksandr Ponomaryov (singer, represented Ukraine in 2003), Oleksandr Zlotnik (composer), Ihor Poklad (composer), Vasyl Vovkun (Minister of Culture and Tourism of Ukraine) and Serhiy Kuzin (CEO of Russian Radio Ukraine) reviewed the 109 received submissions and shortlisted five songs to compete in the national final. On 20 February 2008, the five selected competing songs were announced.

The national final took place on 23 February 2008 at the NTU Studios in Kyiv, hosted by Maria Orlova and Timur Miroshnychenko and broadcast on Pershyi Natsionalnyi. All five competing songs were performed Ani Lorak and the winning song, "Shady Lady", was selected through the combination of votes from a public televote and an expert jury. The jury panel consisted of Serhiy Kuzin, Eduard Klim, Oleksandr Ponomaryov and Oleksandr Zlotnik, and "Shady Lady" was also Lorak's personal favorite. 10,765 votes were registered by the televote during the show. In addition to the performances of the competing songs, Oleksandr Ponomaryov, Ilona Halytska (who represented Ukraine in Junior Eurovision 2007), Elnur and Samir (who would represent Azerbaijan in 2008), Ruslan Alekhno (who would represent Belarus in 2008), Tereza Kerndlová (who would represent the Czech Republic in 2008), Morena (who would represent Malta in 2008), and Geta Burlacu (who would represent Moldova in 2008), performed as guests.

Final – 23 February 2008
R/O	Song	Songwriter(s)	Jury	Televote				Total	Place
R/O	Song	Songwriter(s)	Jury	Phone	SMS	Total	Points	Total	Place
1	"Zhdu tebya" (Жду тебя)	Yuriy Ostapenko, Ani Lorak	1	69	847	916	1	2	5
2	"Ya stanu morem" (Я стану морем)	Vitaliy Volkomor, Mykola Brovchenko	2	233	1,225	1,458	2	4	4
3	"The Dream of Brighter Day"	Ani Lorak, Yuriy Sak	3	368	2,491	2,859	5	8	2
4	"I'm Your Melody"	Bozhena Kostromskaya	5	168	1,444	1,612	3	8	2
5	"Shady Lady"	Philip Kirkorov, Karen Kavaleryan	7	512	3,397	3,920	7	14	1

=== Promotion ===
Ani Lorak made several appearances across Europe to specifically promote "Shady Lady" as the Ukrainian Eurovision entry. On 9 March, Lorak performed "Shady Lady" during the semi-final of the Russian Eurovision national final Evrovidenie 2008. On 25 April, Lorak performed during the UK Eurovision Preview Party, which was held at the Scala venue in London, United Kingdom and hosted by Paddy O'Connell. On 28 April, Lorak performed during an event held at the Place Sainte-Catherine/Sint-Katelijneplein in Brussels, Belgium. Ani Lorak also took part in promotional activities in Belarus, Estonia, Latvia, Lithuania, and Russia performing a guest of Philip Kirkorov's concert tour, and concluded promotional activities in Bosnia and Herzegovina, Bulgaria, Cyprus, Greece, Malta, Macedonia, and Spain which included television and radio appearances.

== At Eurovision ==
It was announced in September 2007 that the competition's format would be expanded to two semi-finals in 2008. According to Eurovision rules, all nations with the exceptions of the host country and the "Big Four" (France, Germany, Spain, and the United Kingdom) are required to qualify from one of two semi-finals in order to compete for the final; the top nine songs from each semi-final as determined by televoting progress to the final, and a tenth was determined by back-up juries. The European Broadcasting Union (EBU) split up the competing countries into six different pots based on voting patterns from previous contests, with countries with favourable voting histories put into the same pot. On 28 January 2008, a special allocation draw was held which placed each country into one of the two semi-finals. Ukraine was placed into the second semi-final, to be held on 22 May 2008. The running order for the semi-finals was decided through another draw on 17 March 2008 and Ukraine was set to perform in position 4, following the entry from Turkey and before the entry from Lithuania.

In Ukraine, both the semi-finals and the final were broadcast on Pershyi Natsionalnyi with commentary by Timur Miroshnychenko. The Ukrainian spokesperson, who announced the Ukrainian votes during the final, was Marysya Horobets.

=== Semi-final ===
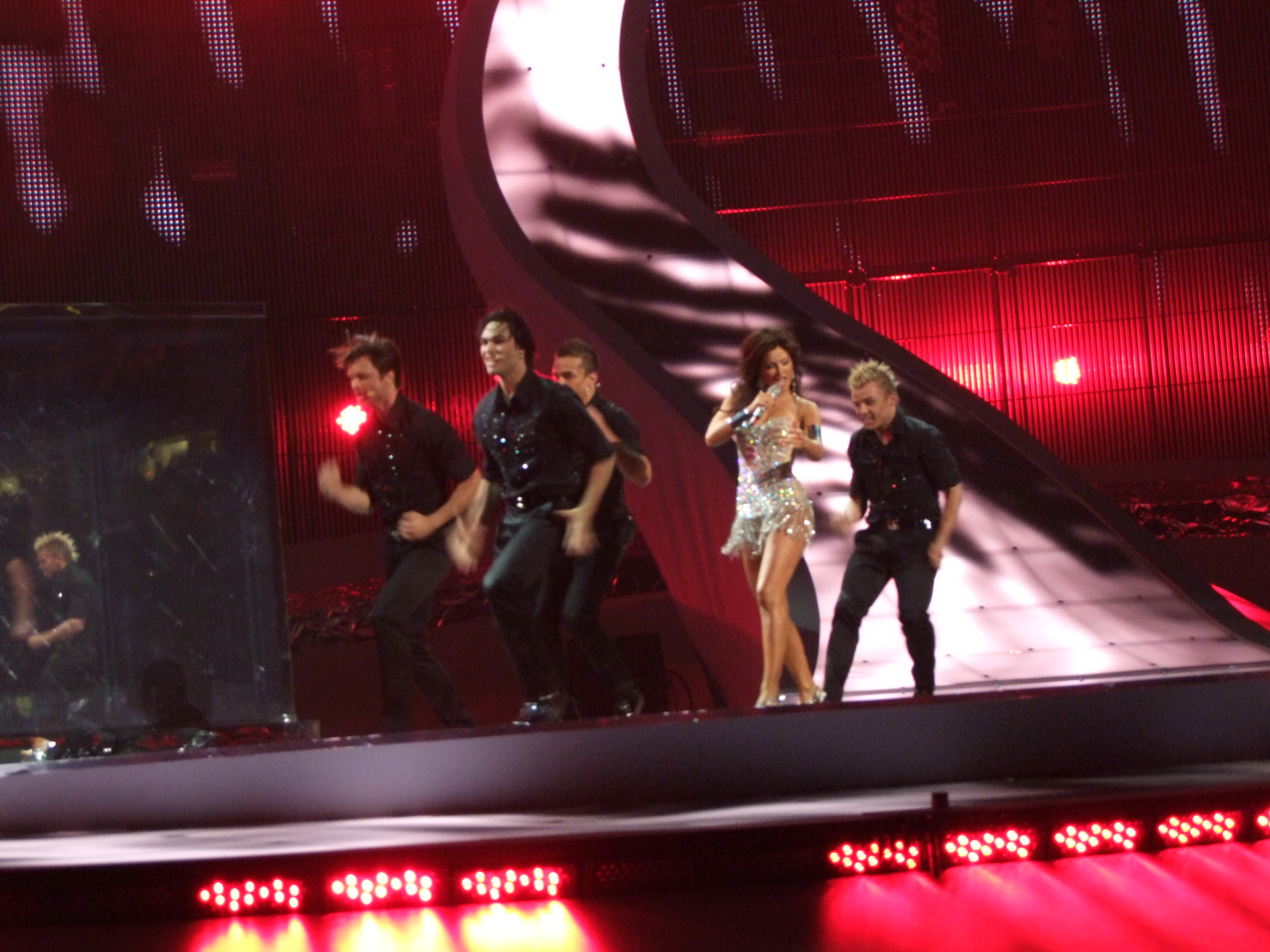
Ani Lorak during a rehearsal before the second semi-final

Ani Lorak took part in technical rehearsals on 13 and 16 May, followed by dress rehearsals on 21 and 22 May. The Ukrainian performance featured Ani Lorak performing on stage in a silver dress designed by Roberto Cavalli together with four dancers and a backing vocalist. The performance began with the dancers being revealed one by one as individual sections of a rectangular glass wall lit up. The dancers then emerge on stage to join Lorak to perform a dance routine together. Towards the end of the song, Lorak climbed to the top of the wall and was helped back down by the dancers. The stage and LED screens displayed red and black colours. The stage director and choreographer for the Ukrainian performance was Fokas Evangelinos.

At the end of the show, Ukraine was announced as having finished in the top 10 and subsequently qualifying for the grand final. It was later revealed that Ukraine placed first in the semi-final, receiving a total of 152 points.

=== Final ===
Shortly after the second semi-final, a winners' press conference was held for the ten qualifying countries. As part of this press conference, the qualifying artists took part in a draw to determine the running order of the final. This draw was done in the order the countries appeared in the semi-final running order. Ukraine was drawn to perform in position 18, following the entry from Georgia and before the entry from France.

Ani Lorak once again took part in dress rehearsals on 23 and 24 May before the final. Ani Lorak performed a repeat of her semi-final performance during the final on 24 May. At the conclusion of the voting, Ukraine finished in second place with 230 points.

=== Voting ===
Below is a breakdown of points awarded to Ukraine and awarded by Ukraine in the second semi-final and grand final of the contest. The nation awarded its 12 points to Georgia in the semi-final and to Russia in the final of the contest.

==== Points awarded to Ukraine ====
Points awarded to Ukraine (Semi-final 2)
Score	Country
12 points	Belarus; Bulgaria; Czech Republic; Georgia; Portugal; Turkey
10 points	Cyprus
8 points	Hungary; Malta; Serbia
7 points	Croatia; Denmark; Lithuania
6 points	Iceland; Latvia; Macedonia
5 points	
4 points	
3 points	France; Sweden
2 points	
1 point	Switzerland

Points awarded to Ukraine (Final)
Score	Country
12 points	Portugal
10 points	Azerbaijan; Belarus; Georgia; Israel; Latvia; Malta; Poland
8 points	Albania; Czech Republic; Russia; Turkey
7 points	Bulgaria; Croatia; Denmark; Moldova; Spain
6 points	Andorra; Cyprus; Greece; Hungary; Ireland; Lithuania; Serbia
5 points	Armenia; Iceland; United Kingdom
4 points	Estonia; Macedonia; Montenegro
3 points	Bosnia and Herzegovina; Finland; Romania
2 points	Slovenia
1 point	Belgium

==== Points awarded by Ukraine ====
Points awarded by Ukraine (Semi-final 2)
Score	Country
12 points	Georgia
10 points	Belarus
8 points	Portugal
7 points	Croatia
6 points	Bulgaria
5 points	Turkey
4 points	Denmark
3 points	Albania
2 points	Latvia
1 point	Iceland

Points awarded by Ukraine (Final)
Score	Country
12 points	Russia
10 points	Azerbaijan
8 points	Georgia
7 points	Armenia
6 points	Norway
5 points	Israel
4 points	Turkey
3 points	Portugal
2 points	Greece
1 point	Croatia
