= Israel in the Eurovision Song Contest 2008 =

- Eurovision Song Contest 2008
- Participating broadcaster: Israel Broadcasting Authority (IBA)
- Country: Israel
- Selection process: Artist: Internal selection Song: Kdam Eurovision 2008
- Selection date: Artist: 14 November 2007; Song: 26 January 2008

Competing entry
- Song: "The Fire in Your Eyes"
- Artist: Boaz Ma'uda
- Songwriters: Dana International; Shay Kerem

Placement
- Semi-final result: Qualified (5th, 104 points)
- Final result: 9th, 124 points

Participation chronology

Israel was represented at the Eurovision Song Contest 2008 with the song "The Fire in Your Eyes", written by Dana International and Shay Kerem, and performed by Boaz Ma'uda. The Israeli participating broadcaster, the Israel Broadcasting Authority (IBA), selected its entry through the national final Kdam Eurovision 2008, after having previously selected the performer internally in November 2007. The national final took place on 15 March 2010 and featured five songs. "Ke'ilu Kan" emerged as the winning song after achieving the highest score following the combination of votes from two regional juries, two thematical jury groups, a jury panel and a public vote. The song title was later translated from Hebrew to English for the Eurovision Song Contest and was titled "The Fire in Your Eyes".

Israel was drawn to compete in the first semi-final of the Eurovision Song Contest 2008. Performing during the show in position 2, "The Fire in Your Eyes" was announced among the top 10 entries of the second semi-final and therefore qualified to compete in the final. It was later revealed that Israel placed fifth out of the 19 participating countries in the semi-final with 104 points. In the final, Israel performed in position 7 and placed ninth out of the 25 participating countries, scoring 124 points.

== Background ==
Prior to the 2008 contest, the Israel Broadcasting Authority (IBA) had participated in the Eurovision Song Contest representing Israel thirty times since its first entry in 1973. It has won the contest on three occasions: in 1978 with the song "A-Ba-Ni-Bi" by Izhar Cohen and the Alphabeta, in 1979 with the song "Hallelujah" by Milk and Honey, and in 1998 with the song "Diva" by Dana International. Since the introduction of semi-finals to the format of the Eurovision Song Contest in 2004, Israel has, to this point, managed to qualify to the final two times, including a top ten result in 2005 with "HaSheket SheNish'ar" by Shiri Maimon placing fourth. Israel had qualified to the final for two consecutive years in 2005 and 2006 prior to their non-qualification in 2007 with the song "Push the Button" performed by the band Teapacks.

As part of its duties as participating broadcaster, IBA organises the selection of its entry in the Eurovision Song Contest and broadcasts the event in the country. The broadcaster confirmed its participation in the 2008 contest on 4 July 2007 and formalised a collaboration with commercial broadcaster Keshet for the first time in order to select the Israeli entrant through the reality singing competition Kokhav Nolad. In 2007, IBA conducted an internal selection to select the artist and a national final to select the song, a selection procedure that continued for its 2008 entry.

== Before Eurovision ==
=== Artist selection ===
On 14 November 2007, IBA announced that the winner of season five of the reality singing competition Kochav Nolad, Boaz Ma'uda, was selected as its representative for the Eurovision Song Contest 2008. IBA previously revealed in July 2007 that one of the participants of season five's Kokhav Nolad produced by Tedy Productions and Keshet Media Group would represent Israel at the contest. Together with the artist reveal, it was also announced that a national final titled Kdam Eurovision 2008 featuring five songs would take place to select his song.

=== Kdam Eurovision 2008 ===
IBA opened the public song submission following the announcement of Ma'uda as the selected artist with the deadline on 6 January 2008. IBA also directly invited composers to submit songs for the competition. 450 submissions were received at the close of the deadline, of which 350 were submitted by the public. Five songs were chosen for the competition by a professional committee with members from IBA and Keshet and announced on 23 January 2008. Among the competing composers was Dana International, who won Eurovision for Israel in 1998. The members of the committee were Yoav Ginai (entertainment director of IBA), Haim Hador (radio presenter), Yaakov Naveh (IBA artists representative), Tamira Yardeni (Kochav Nolad producer), Yoav Tzafir (director of Kochav Nolad), Uri Selai (editor at Tedy Productions) and Tzedi Tzarfati (judging panel member of Kochav Nolad). Prior to the final, the songs were presented on 21 February 2008 during a special presentation programme broadcast online via IBA's official Eurovision Song Contest website Eurovil, hosted by Jason Danino-Holt.

==== Final ====
The final took place over two days at the Ulpaneii TV Studios in Herzeliya, hosted by Tzvika Hadar and broadcast on Channel 2 as well as online via Eurovil and keshet-tv.com. During the first show on 25 February 2008, all five competing songs were performed by Boaz Ma'uda with two performed in a duet with other Israeli singers, and the public was able to vote for their favourite song through SMS until the second show 26 February 2008, during which the winning song, "Ke'ilu Kan", was selected by a combination of the votes from six voting groups: two regional juries (14%), two thematical jury groups (14%), an expert jury of IBA and Keshet representatives (36%) and the public vote (36%). In addition to the performances of the competing songs during the first show, Ilanit (who represented Israel in 1973) performed her Eurovision entry "Ey Sham" as the opening act, while the participants of season five's Kochav Nolad together with Izhar Cohen (who won Eurovision for Israel in 1978) performed as the interval act. A judging panel composed of Brotherhood of Man (who won Eurovision for the United Kingdom in 1976), Ralf Siegel, Carola Häggkvist (who won Eurovision for Sweden in 1991), Moshe Datz (who represented Israel in 1991), Nurit Hirsh, Kobi Oshrat, Michal Amdursky, and Assaf Amdursky was also featured which provided feedback to the songs and selected "Ke'ilu Kan" as their favourite song.

Final – 26 January 2008
R/O	Artist	Song	Songwriter(s)	Jury	Televote	Total	Place
1	Boaz Ma'uda	"Masa Hayai" (מסע חיי)	Itay Pearl	52	30	82	5
2	Boaz Ma'uda and Maya Avraham	"Hi'ne Ha'or" (הנה האור)	Ovadia Hamama	64	20	84	4
3	Boaz Ma'uda	"Bli Ahava" (בלי אהבה)	Henree	80	40	120	2
4	Boaz Ma'uda and Oshrat Papir	"Parparim" (פרפרים)	Doron Gal	60	50	110	3
5	Boaz Ma'uda	"Ke'ilu Kan" (כאילו כאן)	Dana International, Shay Kerem	104	60	164	1

Detailed Jury Vote
R/O	Song	Kiryat Shmona	Sderot	OGAE Israel	Kokhav Nolad judges	Expert jury	Total
1	"Masa Hayai"	4	4	12	12	20	52
2	"Hine Ha'or"	6	10	4	4	40	64
3	"Bli Ahava"	8	8	6	8	50	80
4	"Parparim"	10	6	8	6	30	60
5	"Ke'ilu Kan"	12	12	10	10	60	104

=== Promotion ===
On 17 April, Boaz Ma'uda performed during a concert which was organised by the Keren Hayesod organisation in Amsterdam, Netherlands, to specifically promote "The Fire in Your Eyes" as the Israeli Eurovision entry.

== At Eurovision ==
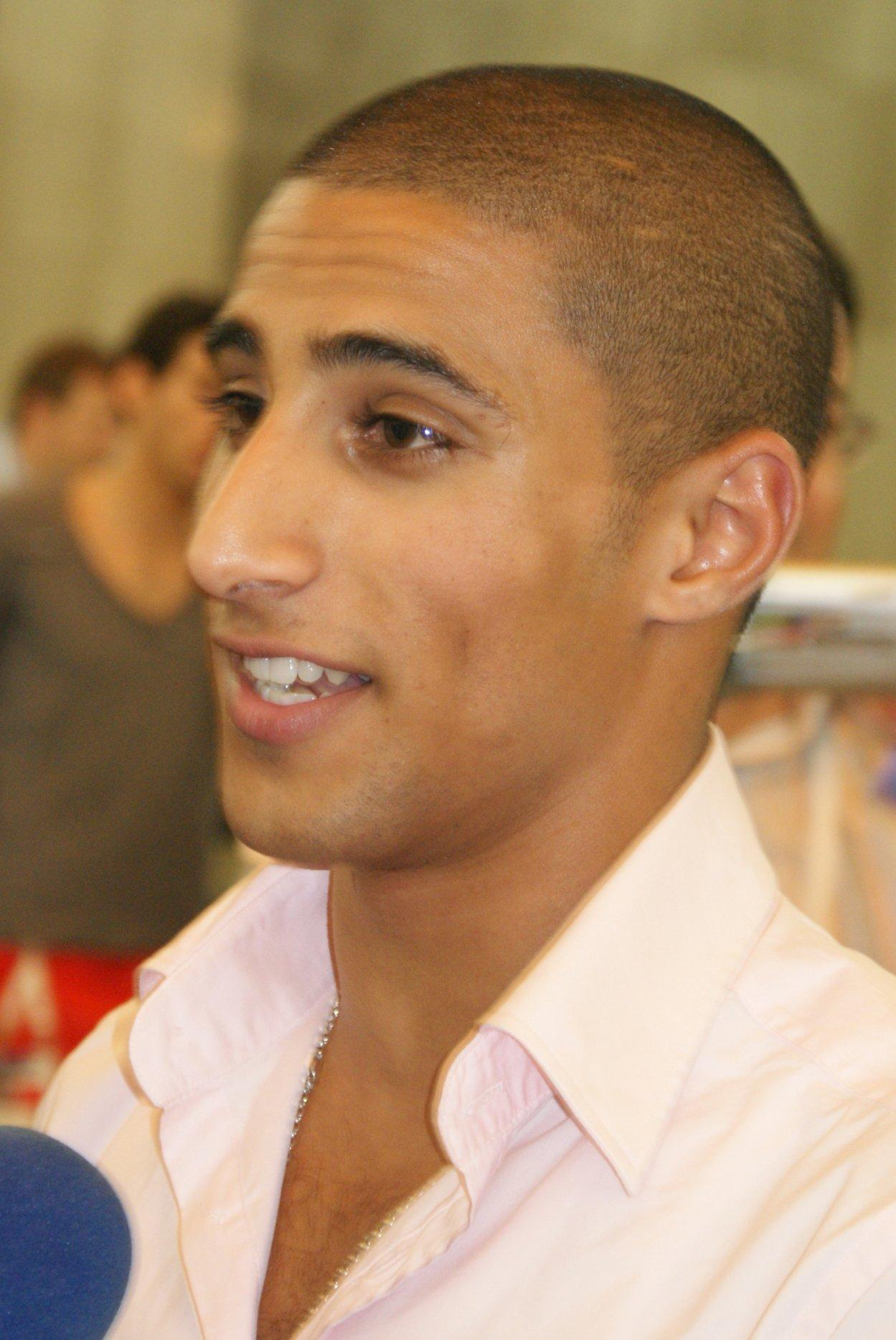
Boaz Ma'uda during a press interview

It was announced in September 2007 that the competition's format would be expanded to two semi-finals in 2008. According to the rules, all nations with the exceptions of the host country and the "Big Four" (France, Germany, Spain and the United Kingdom) are required to qualify from one of two semi-finals in order to compete for the final; the top nine songs from each semi-final as determined by televoting progress to the final, and a tenth was determined by back-up juries. The European Broadcasting Union (EBU) split up the competing countries into six different pots based on voting patterns from previous contests, with countries with favourable voting histories put into the same pot. On 28 January 2008, a special allocation draw was held which placed each country into one of the two semi-finals. Israel was placed into the first semi-final, to be held on 20 May 2008. The running order for the semi-finals was decided through another draw on 17 March 2008 and Israel was set to perform in position 2, following the entry from Montenegro and before the entry from Estonia.

IBA televised live the two semi-finals and the final in Israel. IBA appointed Noa Barak-Weshler as its spokesperson to announce the Israeli votes during the final.

=== Semi-final ===
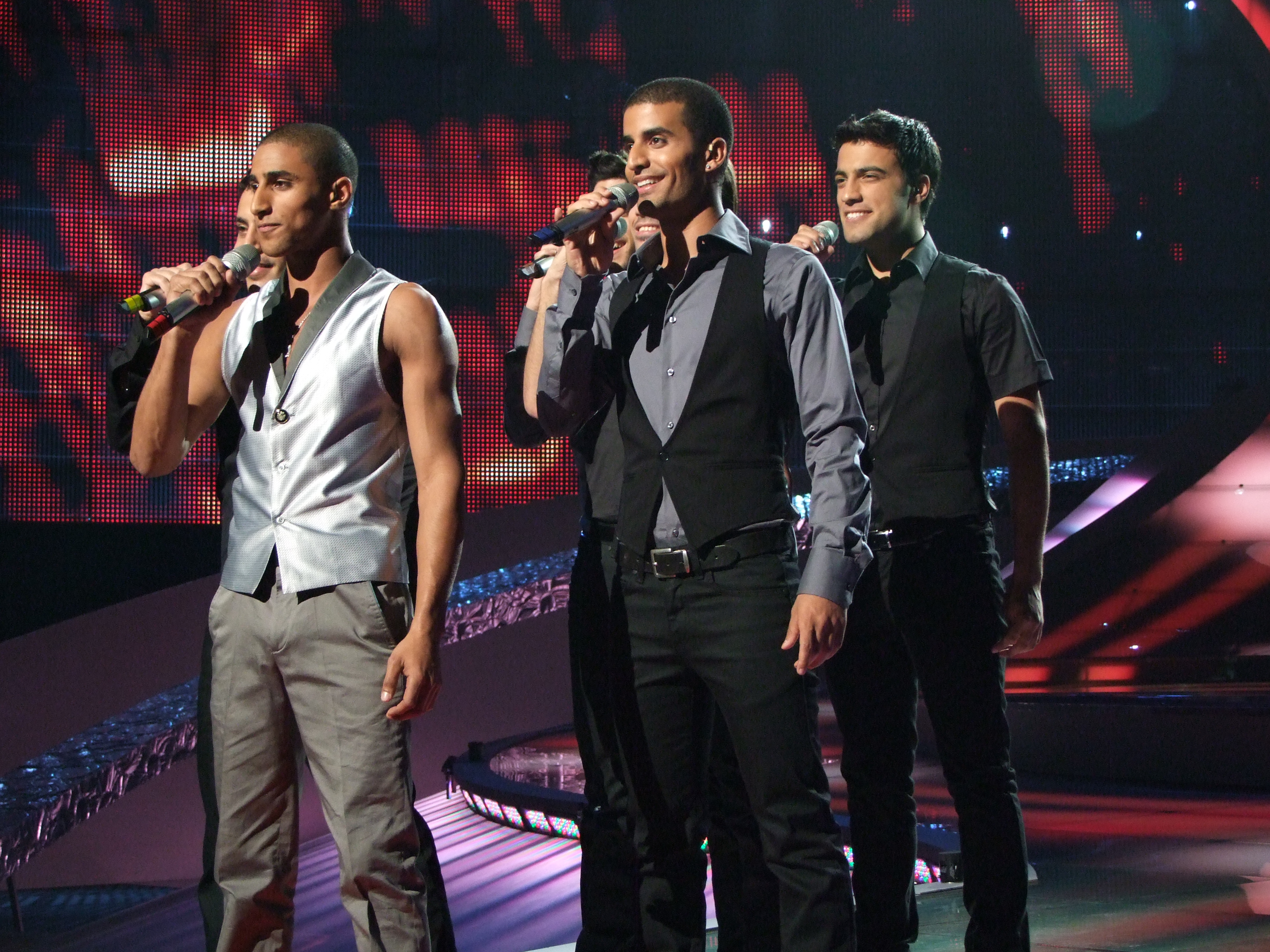
Boaz Ma'uda during a rehearsal before the first semi-final

Boaz Ma'uda took part in technical rehearsals on 11 and 15 May, followed by dress rehearsals on 19 and 20 May. The Israeli performance featured Boaz Ma'uda performing in a silver sleeveless shirt together with five male backing vocalists in black outfits. The performance began with the performers moving from behind the stage to the center part of the stage, with the backing vocalists later joining Ma'uda from the left side of the stage to the front stage. The stage was predominately blue and red with the LED screens displaying red elements. The five backing vocalists performing on stage with Boaz Ma'uda were Adam Yosef, Ariel Zohar, Eran Mazor Hecht, Lior Ashkenazi and Zach Eshel.

At the end of the show, Israel was announced as having finished in the top 10 and subsequently qualifying for the grand final. It was later revealed that Israel placed fifth in the semi-final, receiving a total of 104 points

=== Final ===
Shortly after the first semi-final, a winners' press conference was held for the ten qualifying countries. As part of this press conference, the qualifying artists took part in a draw to determine the running order of the final. This draw was done in the order the countries appeared in the semi-final running order. Israel was drawn to perform in position 7, following the entry from Bosnia and Herzegovina and before the entry from Finland. Boaz Ma'uda once again took part in dress rehearsals on 23 and 24 May before the final. Israel placed ninth in the final, scoring 124 points.

=== Voting ===
Below is a breakdown of points awarded to Israel and awarded by Israel in the first semi-final and grand final of the contest. The nation awarded its 12 points to Russia in the semi-final and the final of the contest.

==== Points awarded to Israel ====
Points awarded to Israel (Semi-final 1)
Score	Country
12 points	
10 points	Azerbaijan; Finland; Norway
8 points	Russia
7 points	Andorra; Armenia; Belgium
6 points	Netherlands; Romania
5 points	Bosnia and Herzegovina; Greece; Montenegro
4 points	Germany; Poland; Slovenia; Spain
3 points	
2 points	San Marino
1 point	

Points awarded to Israel (Final)
Score	Country
12 points	
10 points	San Marino
8 points	Finland
7 points	Azerbaijan; Serbia
6 points	Armenia; France; Moldova; Romania; Russia
5 points	Belgium; Bosnia and Herzegovina; Montenegro; Poland; Ukraine
4 points	Albania; Belarus
3 points	Georgia; Germany; Hungary; Lithuania; Netherlands; Norway; Slovenia
2 points	Bulgaria; Croatia; Cyprus
1 point	Greece; Switzerland

==== Points awarded by Israel ====
Points awarded by Israel (Semi-final 1)
Score	Country
12 points	Russia
10 points	Armenia
8 points	Romania
7 points	Greece
6 points	Norway
5 points	Azerbaijan
4 points	Andorra
3 points	Ireland
2 points	Slovenia
1 point	Netherlands

Points awarded by Israel (Final)
Score	Country
12 points	Russia
10 points	Ukraine
8 points	Armenia
7 points	Norway
6 points	Romania
5 points	Greece
4 points	Iceland
3 points	Azerbaijan
2 points	Georgia
1 point	Sweden
