= Armenia in the Eurovision Song Contest 2008 =

- Eurovision Song Contest 2008
- Participating broadcaster: Public Television of Armenia (AMPTV)
- Country: Armenia
- Selection process: Artist: Internal selection Song: Evrotesil 2008
- Selection date: Artist: 15 November 2007; Song: 8 March 2008

Competing entry
- Song: "Qélé, Qélé"
- Artist: Sirusho
- Songwriters: H.A. Der-Hovagimian (aka DerHova); Sirusho Harutyunyan

Placement
- Semi-final result: Qualified (2nd, 139 points)
- Final result: 4th, 199 points

Participation chronology

Armenia was represented at the Eurovision Song Contest 2008 with the song "Qélé, Qélé", composed by H.A. Der-Hovagimian (aka DerHova), with lyrics by Sirusho, and performed by Sirusho herself. The Armenian participating broadcaster, Public Television of Armenia (AMPTV), selected its entry through the national final Evrotesil 2008, after having previously selected the performer internally. Sirusho's appointment as the Armenian artist was announced on 15 November 2007, while the song was selected through a national final, which took place on 8 March 2008 where four songs competed. "Qélé, Qélé" was selected as the winning song after gaining 86.5% of the public televote.

Armenia was drawn to compete in the first semi-final of the Eurovision Song Contest which took place on 20 May 2008. Performing during the show in position 14, "Qélé, Qélé" was announced among the 10 qualifying entries of the first semi-final and therefore qualified to compete in the final on 24 May. It was later revealed that Armenia placed second out of the 19 participating countries in the semi-final with 139 points. In the final, Armenia performed in position 5 and placed fourth out of the 25 participating countries with 199 points.

== Background ==
Prior to the 2008 contest, Public Television of Armenia (AMPTV) had participated in the Eurovision Song Contest representing Armenia two times since its first entry in 2006. Its both entries have featured in the final and have achieved its highest placing in the contest with eighth place: in 2006 with the song "Without Your Love" performed by André, and in 2007 with the song "Anytime You Need" performed by Hayko.

As part of its duties as participating broadcaster, AMPTV organises the selection of its entry in the Eurovision Song Contest and broadcasts the event in the country. The broadcaster confirmed its intentions to participate at the 2008 contest on 15 November 2007. AMPTV has used various methods to select its entry in the past, such as internal selections and a live televised national final to choose both the performer and song to compete at Eurovision. The broadcaster opted to internally select the artist for the 2008 contest, with a national final being organized to select the song.

== Before Eurovision ==
=== Artist selection ===
The Art Council of AMPTV internally selected the Armenian representative for the Eurovision Song Contest 2008. On 15 November 2007, AMPTV announced Sirusho as its entrant. The broadcaster also announced that a national final would be held to select her song.

=== Evrotesil 2008 ===
Following their artist reveal, AMPTV announced a public call for song submissions from Armenian songwriters with a deadline of 15 January 2008. 10 songs were submitted and a jury panel together with Sirusho selected four songs to proceed to the national final, which were announced on 6 March 2008. The national final was scheduled to take place on 8 March 2008 at the Academic Opera and Ballet Theatre in Yerevan, however due to a State of Emergency in Armenia, the show, hosted by Gohar Gasparyan and Felix Khachatryan and broadcast on Channel 1, took place at the AMPTV studios in Yerevan instead. All four competing songs were performed by Sirusho and the winning song, "Qélé, Qélé", was selected exclusively by a public vote. The song was composed, co-written and produced by Canadian-Armenian composer/producer H.A. Der-Hovagimian (DerHova). In addition to the performances of the competing songs, the interval act featured previous year's Eurovision entrant Hayko performing his entry "Anytime You Need".

R/O	Song	Songwriter(s)	Televote	Place
1	"Strong"	Vahram Petrosyan, Sirusho	2.4%	4
2	"I Can't Control It"	DJ Serjo, Sirusho	6.0%	2
3	"I Still Breathe"	Martin Mirzoyan, Sirusho	5.1%	3
4	"Qélé, Qélé" (Քելե Քելե)	H.A. Der-Hovagimian, Sirusho	86.5%	1

=== Promotion ===
Sirusho made several appearances across Europe to specifically promote "Qélé, Qélé" as the Armenian Eurovision entry. On 6 April, Sirusho performed during the Armenia Tashir Awards which was held in Moscow, Russia. On 25 April, Sirusho performed during the UK Eurovision Preview Party, which was held at the Scala venue in London, United Kingdom, and hosted by Paddy O'Connell. Sirusho also completed promotional activities in France where she performed during a concert which was held at the Le Garden venue in Paris on 29 April.

== At Eurovision ==
It was announced in September 2007 that the competition's format would be expanded to two semi-finals in 2008. All countries except the "Big 4" (France, Germany, Spain and the United Kingdom), and the host country, are required to qualify from one of two semi-finals in order to compete for the final; the top nine songs from each semi-final as determined by televoting progress to the final, and a tenth was determined by back-up juries. The European Broadcasting Union (EBU) split up the competing countries into six different pots based on voting patterns from previous contests, with countries with favourable voting histories put into the same pot. On 28 January 2008, a special allocation draw was held which placed each country into one of the two semi-finals. Armenia was placed into the first semi-final, to be held on 20 May 2008. The running order for the semi-finals was decided through another draw on 17 March 2008 and Armenia was set to perform in position 14, following the entry from Bosnia and Herzegovina and before the entry from the Netherlands.

In Armenia, the two semi-finals and the final were broadcast on Channel 1 with commentary by Felix Khacatryan and Hrachuhi Utmazyan. AMPTV appointed Hrachuhi Utmazyan as its spokesperson to announced the Armenian votes during the final.

=== Semi-final ===
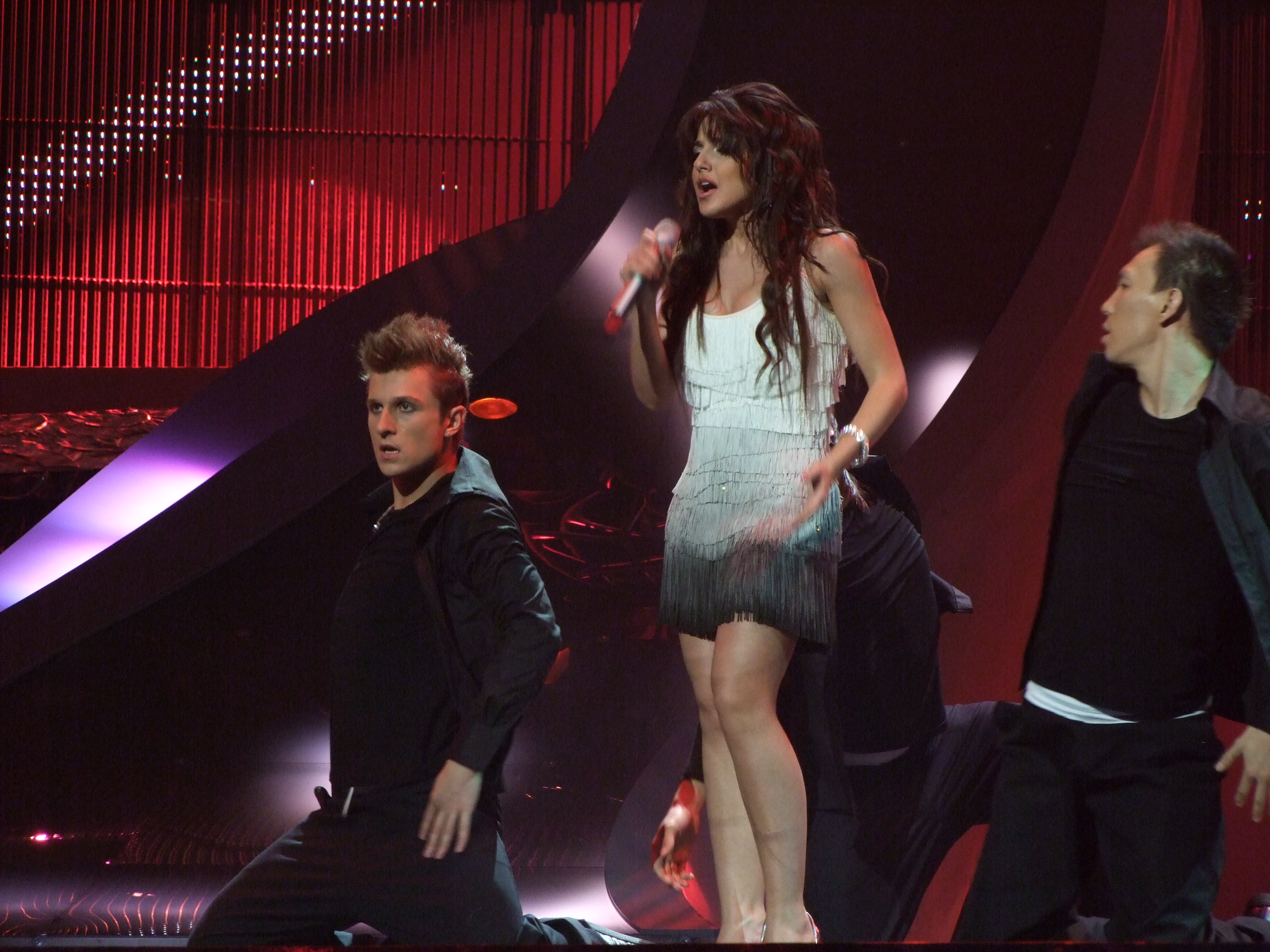
Sirusho during a rehearsal before the first semi-final

Sirusho took part in technical rehearsals on 12 and 16 May, followed by dress rehearsals on 19 and 20 May. The Armenian performance featured Sirusho wearing a short white, grey and black dress designed by designer Arevik Simonyan and performing a dance routine on stage together with three dancers. The stage presentation began with the dancers entangling around Sirusho's legs which made wave in the air while stooping. Pyrotechnic effects were also included throughout the performance. The stage director and choreographer for the Armenian performance was Sergey Mandrik. Sirusho was also joined by two off-stage backing vocalists: Tigran Petrosyan and Razmik Amyan. Stylist and the make-up artist was Aga Kankanyan.

At the end of the show, Armenia was announced as having finished in the top 10 and subsequently qualifying for the grand final. It was later revealed that Armenia placed second in the semi-final, receiving a total of 139 points.

=== Final ===
Shortly after the first semi-final, a winners' press conference was held for the ten qualifying countries. As part of this press conference, the qualifying artists took part in a draw to determine the running order for the final. This draw was done in the order the countries were announced during the semi-final. Armenia was drawn to perform in position 5, following the entry from Germany and before the entry from Bosnia and Herzegovina.

Sirusho once again took part in dress rehearsals on 23 and 24 May before the final. Sirusho performed a repeat of her semi-final performance during the final on 24 May. At the conclusion of the voting, Armenia finished in fourth place with 199 points.

=== Voting ===
Below is a breakdown of points awarded to Armenia and awarded by Armenia in the first semi-final and grand final of the contest. The nation awarded its 12 points to Russia in the semi-final and the final of the contest.

==== Points awarded to Armenia ====
Points awarded to Armenia (Semi-final 1)
Score	Country
12 points	Belgium; Greece; Netherlands; Poland; Russia
10 points	Germany; Israel; Spain
8 points	San Marino
7 points	
6 points	Bosnia and Herzegovina; Montenegro
5 points	Moldova; Romania; Slovenia
4 points	Finland
3 points	Andorra; Norway
2 points	Estonia; Ireland
1 point	

Points awarded to Armenia (Final)
Score	Country
12 points	Belgium; Czech Republic; France; Georgia; Greece; Netherlands; Poland; Russia
10 points	Cyprus; Spain; Turkey
8 points	Bulgaria; Israel; San Marino
7 points	Belarus; Ukraine
6 points	Bosnia and Herzegovina; Germany
5 points	Serbia; Slovenia
4 points	Romania
3 points	
2 points	Albania; Moldova; Sweden
1 point	Iceland; Macedonia; Montenegro

==== Points awarded by Armenia ====
Points awarded by Armenia (Semi-final 1)
Score	Country
12 points	Russia
10 points	Greece
8 points	Norway
7 points	Israel
6 points	Moldova
5 points	Romania
4 points	Slovenia
3 points	Netherlands
2 points	Azerbaijan
1 point	Poland

Points awarded by Armenia (Final)
Score	Country
12 points	Russia
10 points	Georgia
8 points	Greece
7 points	Norway
6 points	Israel
5 points	Ukraine
4 points	France
3 points	Serbia
2 points	Croatia
1 point	Spain
