= Bosnia and Herzegovina in the Eurovision Song Contest 2008 =

- Eurovision Song Contest 2008
- Participating broadcaster: Radio and Television of Bosnia and Herzegovina (BHRT)
- Country: Bosnia and Herzegovina
- Selection process: Internal selection
- Announcement date: Artist: 27 December 2007; Song: 3 March 2008

Competing entry
- Song: "Pokušaj"
- Artist: Laka
- Songwriters: Elvir Laković Laka

Placement
- Semi-final result: Qualified (9th, 72 points)
- Final result: 10th, 110 points

Participation chronology

Bosnia and Herzegovina was represented at the Eurovision Song Contest 2008 with the song "Pokušaj" written and performed by Elvir Laković Laka. The Bosnian-Herzegovinian participating broadcaster, Radio and Television of Bosnia and Herzegovina (BHRT), internally selected its entry for the contest. Laka appointment was announced on 27 December 2007, while his song was presented to the public during a show entitled BH Eurosong 2008 on 3 March 2008.

Bosnia and Herzegovina was drawn to compete in the first semi-final of the Eurovision Song Contest which took place on 20 May 2008. Performing during the show in position 13, "Pokušaj" was announced among the 10 qualifying entries of the first semi-final and therefore qualified to compete in the final on 24 May. It was later revealed that Bosnia and Herzegovina placed ninth out of the 19 participating countries in the semi-final with 72 points. In the final, Bosnia and Herzegovina performed in position 6 and placed tenth out of the 25 participating countries, scoring 110 points.

== Background ==
Prior to the 2008 contest, Radio and Television of Bosnia and Herzegovina (BHRT) and its predecessor national broadcasters, had participated in the Eurovision Song Contest representing Bosnia and Herzegovina thirteen times since RTVBiH's first entry in 1993. Their best placing in the contest was third, achieved in 2006 with the song "Lejla" performed by Hari Mata Hari. Following the introduction of semi-finals for the 2004 contest, they had, up to 2016, managed to qualify on each occasion the nation has participated and compete in the final. Their least successful result has been 22nd place, which they have achieved in 1996.

As part of its duties as participating broadcaster, BHRT organises the selection of its entry in the Eurovision Song Contest and broadcasts the event in the country. The broadcaster confirmed its intentions to participate at the 2008 contest on 25 October 2007. The broadcaster had selected its entry through an internal selection process since 2006, a selection procedure that was continued for its 2008 entry.

== Before Eurovision ==
=== Internal selection ===
On 3 November 2007, BHRT opened the submission period for artists and composers to submit their entries up until 20 December 2007. Artists were required to be citizens of Bosnia and Herzegovina, have at least three years of television or concert appearances, and have released at least two albums and three music videos, while songwriters could be of any nationality but were required to submit songs in one of the official languages of Bosnia and Herzegovina. 31 valid submissions out of 50 were received at the closing of the deadline and on 27 December 2007, BHRT announced that they had internally selected Elvir Laković Laka to represent Bosnia and Herzegovina in Belgrade. The seven-member selection committee that determined Laka and the song to be performed at the contest, which was written by Laka himself, consisted of Dejan Kukrić (Bosnian-Herzegovinian Head of Delegation at the Eurovision Song Contest), Milorad Kenjalović (assistant professor at the University of Banja Luka Academy of Arts), Vesna Andree-Zaimović (musicologist), Jasmin Ferović (Head of Music at BH Radio 1), Damir Šehanović (music journalist), Admir Đulandžić (music producer of MP BHRT) and Maja Čengić (press and public relations officer for the Bosnian-Herzegovinian Eurovision Delegation).

The song, "Pokušaj", was presented during a television special entitled BH Eurosong 2008 on 3 March 2008, which was held at the BHRT Studio A in Sarajevo and hosted by Maja Čengić and Aleksandar Seksan. The show was broadcast on BHT 1 and BH Radio 1. In addition to the presentation of the song, the show featured guest performances by the Sarajevo Drum Orchestra, Bosnian singers Adnan Šaran, Dino Šaran and Halid Bešlić, Finnish group ShoWhat featuring Stepup Dancers, Marija Šestić (who represented Bosnia and Herzegovina in 2007), Kraljevi ulice and 75 Cents (who would represent Croatia in 2008), Tamara, Vrčak, and Adrian (who would represent Macedonia in 2008), Isis Gee (who would represent Poland in 2008), and Rebeka Dremelj (who would represent Slovenia in 2008). A Bosnian language version and English language version of the song were prepared, with the song being performed in Bosnian at the Eurovision Song Contest.

=== Promotion ===
Laka made several appearances across Europe to specifically promote "Pokušaj" as the Bosnian-Herzegovinian Eurovision entry. On 9 March, Laka performed "Pokušaj" during the semi-final of the Serbian Eurovision national final Beovizija 2008. On 25 April, Laka performed during the UK Eurovision Preview Party, which was held at the Scala venue in London, United Kingdom and hosted by Paddy O'Connell. Laka also took part in promotional activities in Belgium and performed during an event held at the Place Sainte-Catherine/Sint-Katelijneplein in Brussels on 28 April.

== At Eurovision ==
It was announced in September 2007 that the competition's format would be expanded to two semi-finals in 2008. According to the rules, all nations with the exceptions of the host country and the "Big Four" (France, Germany, Spain and the United Kingdom) are required to qualify from one of two semi-finals in order to compete for the final; the top nine songs from each semi-final as determined by televoting progress to the final, and a tenth was determined by back-up juries. The European Broadcasting Union (EBU) split up the competing countries into six different pots based on voting patterns from previous contests, with countries with favourable voting histories put into the same pot. On 28 January 2008, a special allocation draw was held which placed each country into one of the two semi-finals. Bosnia and Herzegovina was placed into the first semi-final, to be held on 20 May 2008. The running order for the semi-finals was decided through another draw on 17 March 2008 and Bosnia and Herzegovina was set to perform in position 13, following the entry from Andorra and before the entry from Armenia.

The two semi-finals and the final were broadcast in Bosnia and Herzegovina on BHT 1 with commentary by Dejan Kukrić. BHRT appointed Melina Garibović as its spokesperson to announced the Bosnian-Herzegovinian votes during the final.

=== Semi-final ===
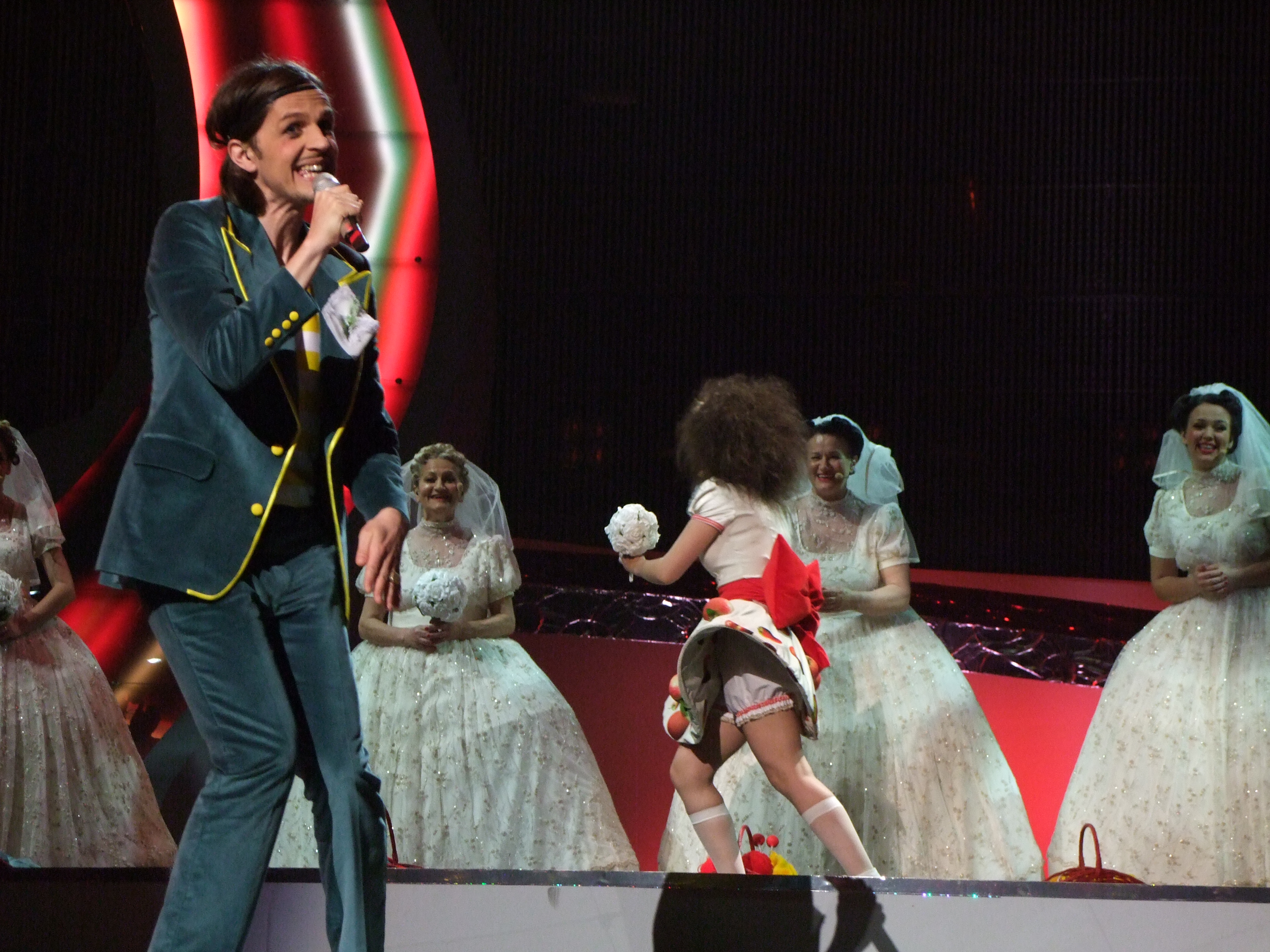
Laka during a rehearsal before the first semi-final

Laka took part in technical rehearsals on 12 and 15 May, followed by dress rehearsals on 19 and 20 May. The Bosnian-Herzegovinian performance featured Laka in a white and yellow striped t-shirt and a blue-green suit, joined on stage by his sister Mirela Laković in a white dress with apples on and four backing vocalists in wedding gowns. The performance began with Mirela hanging clothes on a washing line and collecting bouquets from the backing vocalists, all of them which then knitted. At the end of the performance, the word "LOVE" was displayed on the clothes. The stage lighting and LED screens displayed various colours.

At the end of the show, Bosnia and Herzegovina was announced as having finished in the top 10 and subsequently qualifying for the grand final. It was later revealed that Bosnia and Herzegovina placed ninth in the semi-final, receiving a total of 72 points.

=== Final ===
Shortly after the first semi-final, a winners' press conference was held for the ten qualifying countries. As part of this press conference, the qualifying artists took part in a draw to determine the running order for the final. This draw was done in the order the countries were announced during the semi-final. Bosnia and Herzegovina was drawn to perform in position 6, following the entry from Armenia and before the entry from Israel.

Laka once again took part in dress rehearsals on 23 and 24 May before the final. Laka performed a repeat of his semi-final performance during the final on 24 May. At the conclusion of the voting, Bosnia and Herzegovina finished in tenth place with 110 points.

=== Voting ===
Below is a breakdown of points awarded to Bosnia and Herzegovina and awarded by Bosnia and Herzegovina in the first semi-final and grand final of the contest. The nation awarded its 12 points to Montenegro in the semi-final and to Serbia in the final of the contest.

==== Points awarded to Bosnia and Herzegovina ====
Points awarded to Bosnia and Herzegovina (Semi-final 1)
Score	Country
12 points	Montenegro; Norway; Slovenia
10 points	
8 points	Finland
7 points	Germany; Netherlands
6 points	Moldova
5 points	
4 points	Azerbaijan
3 points	Ireland
2 points	
1 point	Estonia

Points awarded to Bosnia and Herzegovina (Final)
Score	Country
12 points	Croatia; Serbia
10 points	Montenegro; Norway; Slovenia; Sweden
8 points	
7 points	Netherlands; Switzerland
6 points	Finland; Turkey
5 points	Germany; Macedonia
4 points	
3 points	Azerbaijan
2 points	Denmark; France; Ireland
1 point	Czech Republic

==== Points awarded by Bosnia and Herzegovina ====
Points awarded by Bosnia and Herzegovina (Semi-final 1)
Score	Country
12 points	Montenegro
10 points	Slovenia
8 points	Greece
7 points	Russia
6 points	Armenia
5 points	Israel
4 points	Norway
3 points	Azerbaijan
2 points	Ireland
1 point	Finland

Points awarded by Bosnia and Herzegovina (Final)
Score	Country
12 points	Serbia
10 points	Croatia
8 points	Turkey
7 points	Greece
6 points	Armenia
5 points	Israel
4 points	Russia
3 points	Ukraine
2 points	Norway
1 point	Albania
