= Netherlands in the Eurovision Song Contest 2008 =

- Eurovision Song Contest 2008
- Participating broadcaster: Nederlandse Omroep Stichting (NOS)
- Country: Netherlands
- Selection process: Internal selection
- Announcement date: Artist: 23 November 2007; Song: 7 March 2008

Competing entry
- Song: "Your Heart Belongs to Me"
- Artist: Hind
- Songwriters: Hind Laroussi Tahiri; Tjeerd van Zanen; Bas van den Heuvel

Placement
- Semi-final result: Failed to qualify (13th)

Participation chronology

The Netherlands was represented at the Eurovision Song Contest 2008 with the song "Your Heart Belongs to Me", written by Hind Laroussi Tahiri, Tjeerd van Zanen, and Bas van den Heuvel, and performed by Hind herself. The Dutch participating broadcaster, Nederlandse Omroep Stichting (NOS), internally selected its entry for the contest. Hind's appointment was announced on 23 November 2007, while the song, "Your Heart Belongs to Me", was presented to the public on 7 March 2008 during the Nederland 3 programme Thank God it's Friday.

The Netherlands was drawn to compete in the first semi-final of the Eurovision Song Contest which took place on 20 May 2008. Performing during the show in position 15, "Your Heart Belongs to Me" was not announced among the 10 qualifying entries of the first semi-final and therefore did not qualify to compete in the final. It was later revealed that the Netherlands placed thirteenth out of the 19 participating countries in the semi-final with 27 points.

== Background ==
Prior to the 2008 contest, Nederlandse Televisie Stichting (NTS) until 1969, and Nederlandse Omroep Stichting (NOS) since 1970, had participated in the Eurovision Song Contest representing the Netherlands forty-eight times since NTS début in 1956. They have won the contest four times: in 1957 with the song "Net als toen" performed by Corry Brokken; in 1959 with the song "'n Beetje" performed by Teddy Scholten; in 1969 as one of four countries to tie for first place with "De troubadour" performed by Lenny Kuhr; and finally in 1975 with "Ding-a-dong" performed by the group Teach-In. Following the introduction of semi-finals for the 2004 contest, the Netherlands had featured in only one final. The Dutch least successful result has been last place, which they have achieved on four occasions, most recently in 1968. The Netherlands has also received nul points on two occasions; in 1962 and in 1963.

As part of its duties as participating broadcaster, NOS organises the selection of its entry in the Eurovision Song Contest and broadcasts the event in the country. The Dutch broadcaster has used various methods to select its entry in the past, such as the Nationaal Songfestival, a live televised national final to choose the performer, song or both to compete at Eurovision. However, internal selections have also been held on occasion. For 2008, the broadcaster opted to select its entry through an internal selection.

== Before Eurovision ==
=== Internal selection ===
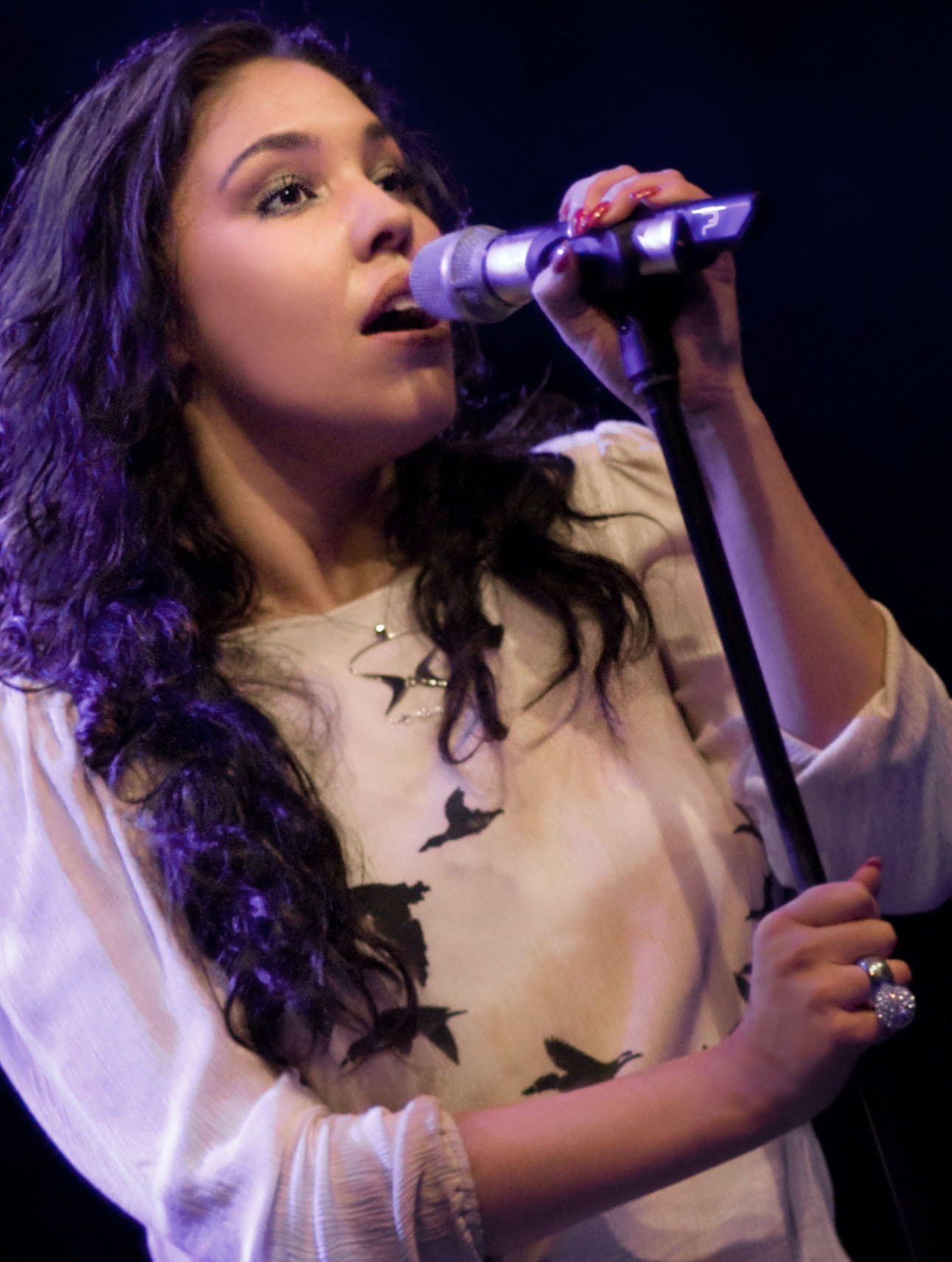
Hind was internally selected to represent the Netherlands in the Eurovision Song Contest 2008

Following their failure to qualify to the final in 2007 with the song "On Top of the World" performed by Edsilia Rombley, the NOS issued a statement to the newspaper De Telegraaf in October 2007 where they revealed that they would continue to internally select both the artist and song for the Eurovision Song Contest, and that several artists had already been in contact with the broadcaster in regards to participating. Artists that were rumoured in Dutch media to be in talks with NOS included the band Bearforce 1 and Gerard Joling, who represented the Netherlands in 1988.

On 9 November 2007, Dutch media reported that NOS had selected singer Hind Laroussi to represent the Netherlands at the 2008 contest. Hind was confirmed as the Dutch entrant on 23 November 2007 during a press conference that took place in Amsterdam and hosted by Gerard Dielessen. A submission period was opened on the same day where composers were able to submit their songs to the broadcaster.

On 7 March 2008, Hind's Eurovision entry, "Your Heart Belongs to Me", was presented to the public during the Nederland 3 programme Thank God it's Friday, hosted by Claudia de Breij. The official video for the song directed by Jelle Posthuma was released on 18 March 2008. "Your Heart Belongs to Me" was written by Hind herself together with Tjeerd van Zanen and Bas van den Heuvel.

== At Eurovision ==
It was announced in September 2007 that the competition's format would be expanded to two semi-finals in 2008. According to the rules, all nations with the exceptions of the host country and the "Big Four" (France, Germany, Spain, and the United Kingdom) are required to qualify from one of two semi-finals in order to compete for the final; the top nine songs from each semi-final as determined by televoting progress to the final, and a tenth was determined by back-up juries. The European Broadcasting Union (EBU) split up the competing countries into six different pots based on voting patterns from previous contests, with countries with favourable voting histories put into the same pot. On 28 January 2008, a special allocation draw was held which placed each country into one of the two semi-finals. The Netherlands was placed into the first semi-final, to be held on 20 May 2008. The running order for the semi-finals was decided through another draw on 17 March 2008 and the Netherlands was set to perform in position 15, following the entry from Armenia and before the entry from Finland.

The two semi-finals and the final was broadcast in the Netherlands on Nederland 1 with commentary by Cornald Maas. NOS appointed Esther Hart, who represented the Netherlands in 2003, as its spokesperson to announce the Dutch votes during the final.

=== Semi-final ===
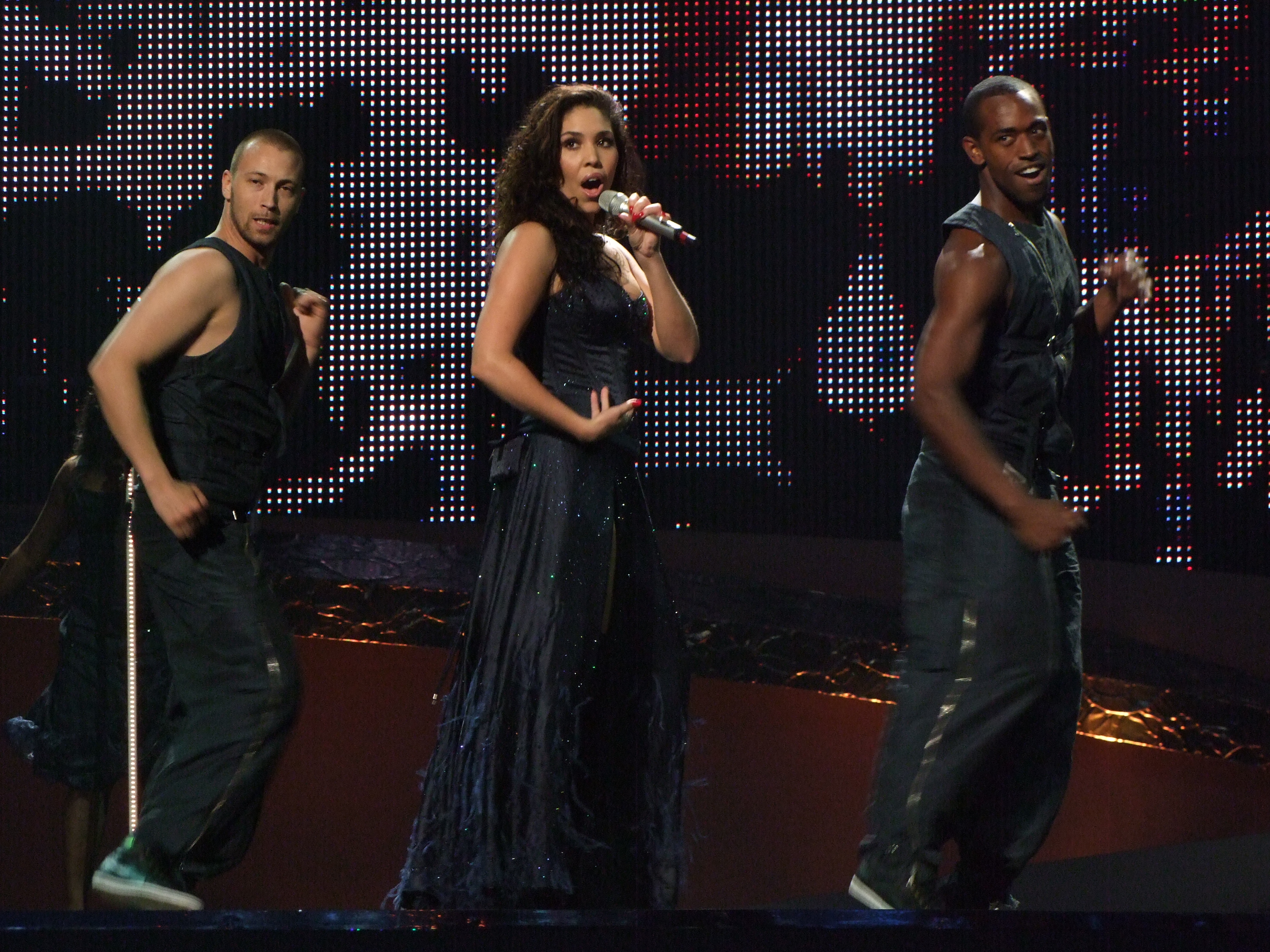
Hind during a rehearsal before the first semi-final

Hind took part in technical rehearsals on 13 and 16 May, followed by dress rehearsals on 19 and 20 May. The Dutch performance featured Hind wearing a dark blue dress with glittering elements designed by Mart Visser and performing together with two dancers and three backing vocalists. The stage colours were predominately yellow with the LED screens displaying big white chandeliers. The two dancers that joined Hind were Deniz Kumas and Serge Dominique Monpellier, while the backing vocalists were Carolina Dijkhuizen, Ellen Eeftink and Peggy Sandaal.

At the end of the show, the Netherlands was not announced among the top 10 entries in the first semi-final and therefore failed to qualify to compete in the final. It was later revealed that the Netherlands placed thirteenth in the semi-final, receiving a total of 27 points.

=== Voting ===
Below is a breakdown of points awarded to the Netherlands and awarded by the Netherlands in the first semi-final and grand final of the contest. The nation awarded its 12 points to Armenia in the semi-final and the final of the contest.

==== Points awarded to the Netherlands ====
Points awarded to the Netherlands (Semi-final 1)
Score	Country
12 points	
10 points	
8 points	Belgium
7 points	Norway
6 points	
5 points	
4 points	
3 points	Armenia; Romania; San Marino
2 points	Azerbaijan
1 point	Israel

==== Points awarded by the Netherlands ====
Points awarded by the Netherlands (Semi-final 1)
Score	Country
12 points	Armenia
10 points	Belgium
8 points	Greece
7 points	Bosnia and Herzegovina
6 points	Israel
5 points	Norway
4 points	Azerbaijan
3 points	Romania
2 points	Russia
1 point	Ireland

Points awarded by the Netherlands (Final)
Score	Country
12 points	Armenia
10 points	Turkey
8 points	Serbia
7 points	Bosnia and Herzegovina
6 points	Greece
5 points	Portugal
4 points	Norway
3 points	Israel
2 points	Azerbaijan
1 point	Russia
