= Serbia in the Eurovision Song Contest 2008 =

- Eurovision Song Contest 2008
- Participating broadcaster: Radio-televizija Srbije (RTS)
- Country: Serbia
- Selection process: Beovizija 2008
- Selection date: 10 March 2008

Competing entry
- Song: "Oro"
- Artist: Jelena Tomašević feat. Bora Dugić
- Songwriters: Željko Joksimović; Dejan Ivanović

Placement
- Final result: 6th, 160 points

Participation chronology

Serbia was represented at the Eurovision Song Contest 2008 with the song "Oro", written by Željko Joksimović and Dejan Ivanović, and performed by Jelena Tomašević featuring Bora Dugić. The Serbian participating broadcaster, Radio-televizija Srbije (RTS), organised the national final Beovizija 2008 in order to select its entry for the contest. In addition, RTS was also the host broadcaster and staged the event at the Belgrade Arena in Belgrade, after winning the previous edition with the song "Molitva" performed by Marija Šerifović.

The national final consisted of two shows: a semi-final and a final on 9 and 10 March 2008, respectively. Twenty entries competed in the semi-final where the top ten qualified to the final following the combination of votes from a three-member jury panel and a public televote. The ten qualifiers competed in the final which resulted in "Oro" performed by Jelena Tomašević featuring Bora Dugić as the winner following the combination of votes from a three-member jury panel and a public televote.

As the host country, Serbia qualified to compete directly in the final of the Eurovision Song Contest. Performing in position 23 during the final, Serbia placed sixth out of the 25 participating countries with 160 points.

== Background ==
Prior to the 2008 Contest, Radio-televizija Srbije (RTS) had participated in the Eurovision Song Contest representing Serbia as an independent nation only in 2007, winning the contest with its debut entry "Molitva" performed by Marija Šerifović.

As part of its duties as participating broadcaster, RTS organises the selection of its entry in the Eurovision Song Contest and broadcasts the event in the country. It confirmed its intentions to participate at the 2008 contest as the host on 21 June 2007. In 2007, RTS used the Beovizija national final in order to select its entry and on 6 October 2007, the broadcaster announced the organization of Beovizija 2008 in order to select its 2008 entry.

== Before Eurovision ==
=== Beovizija 2008 ===
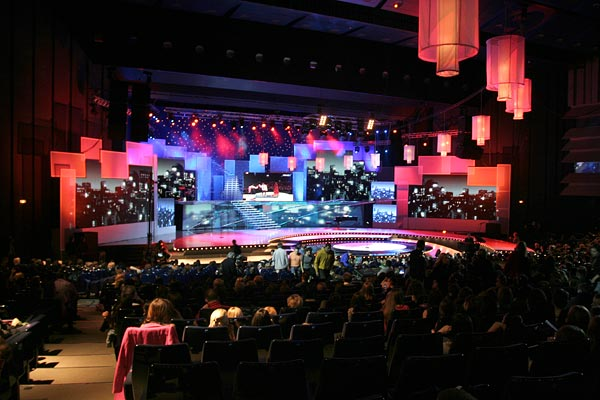
The Beovizija 2008 stage in the Sava Centar, the venue for the festival.

Beovizija 2008 was the sixth edition of the Beovizija national final organised by RTS in order to select its entry for the Eurovision Song Contest 2008. The selection consisted of a semi-final featuring twenty songs and a final featuring ten songs to be held on 9 and 10 March 2008, respectively, at the Sava Centar in Belgrade. Both shows were hosted by Nina Radulović, Đorđe Maričić, Kristina Radenković and Branislav Katić, who were selected to be the hosts during a special selection show named Evropsko lice. The two shows were broadcast on RTS 1, RTS Sat, in Bosnia and Herzegovina on RTRS, via radio on Radio Belgrade as well as streamed online via the broadcaster's website rts.rs and the official Eurovision Song Contest website eurovision.tv. Originally, the semi-final was to be held on 19 February 2008 while the final was to be held a day later. However, due to the unilateral declaration of independence of Kosovo on 17 February, the festival was delayed.

==== Competing entries ====
Artists and songwriters were able to submit their entries between 6 October 2007 and 1 December 2007. Artists were required to be Serb citizens and submit entries in Serbian, while songwriters of any nationality were allowed to submit songs. At the closing of the deadline, 100 submissions were received. A selection committee reviewed the submissions and selected twenty entries to proceed to the national final. The selection committee consisted of RTS music editors Ana Milićević, Anja Rogljić, Zoran Dašić, Nikoleta Dojčinović, Jelena Vlahović, Bilja Krstić, and Miki Stanojević. The selected competing entries were announced on 24 December 2007.

Artist	Song	Songwriter(s)
Aleksa Jelić and Ana Štajdohar	"Beli jablan" (Бели јаблан)	Boris Krstajić, Boban Janković
Andrej Ilić Band	"Tijana" (Тијана)	Vladimir Jovančić
Beauty Queens	"Zavet" (Завет)	Vladmir Graić, Saša Milošević Mare
Betty Boop	"Kvar" (Квар)	Ognjen Cvekić
Dejan Vozlić	"Ako me čuješ" (Ако ме чујеш)	Dejan Vozlić
Denis and Obule	"Bezimena" (Безимена)	Bane Opačić
Drum'n'Zez	"Dunav" (Дунав)	Drum'n'Zez, Vojislav Malešev
Ivana Ćosić	"Kao da hodam" (Као да ходам)	Ivana Ćosić
Jelena Tomašević feat. Bora Dugić	"Oro" (Оро)	Željko Joksimović, Dejan Ivanović
Lejla Hot	"Da si tu" (Да си ту)	Lejla Hot
Marko Vulinović	"Sada ili nikada" (Сада или никада)	Vladimir Preradović, Marko Vulinović
Mogul	"Možda baš" (Можда баш)	Nihad Petonjić, Ana Petonjić
Negative	"S tobom bih ostala" (С тобом бих остала)	Vuk Protić
Nenad Ćeranić	"Slepa ulica" (Слепа улица)	Srdan Simić Kamba, Antonija Šola
Ognjen and Friends	"Čućemo, čućete..." (Чућемо, чућете...)	Ognjen Popović, Tijаna Mangović, Ivan Aleksijević
Sloba Bajić	"Prečica do dna" (Пречица до дна)	Dragana Jovanović
Studio Alektik and Cveta Majtanović	"Iznad nas" (Изнад нас)	Petar Jelić, Aleksandra Berček
Tamara Nikezić	"Nisi prvi" (Ниси први)	Leontina Vukomanović
Zana	"U život kockam se..." (У живот коцкам се...)	Žika Zana, Jelena Zana
Zoe Kida in Zemlja gruva	"Čudesni svetovi" (Чудесни светови)	Zemlja gruva

==== Semi-final ====
The semi-final took place on 9 March 2008 where twenty songs competed. The ten qualifiers for the final were decided by a combination of votes from a jury panel consisting of Vladimir Marićić (jazz pianist and composer), Katarina Gojković (actress) and Aleksander Peković (director of RTS music production), and the Serbian public via SMS voting. Guest performers featured Eurovision contestants Laka, Kraljevi ulice and 75 Cents, Tamara with Vrčak and Adrian, Stefan Filipović, Isis Gee, and Rebeka Dremelj, which would represent Bosnia and Herzegovina, Croatia, Macedonia, Montenegro, Poland, and Slovenia, respectively. The show also featured a tribute to former Eurovision contestant, Toše Proeski, who represented Macedonia in 2004 and died in October 2007. The tragically deceased singer received a lifetime achievement award.

Semi-final – 9 March 2008
R/O	Artist	Song	Jury		Televote		Total	Place
R/O	Artist	Song	Votes	Points	Votes	Points	Total	Place
1	Studio Alektik and Cveta Majtanović	"Iznad nas"	9	4	1,732	8	12	4
2	Drum'n'Zez	"Dunav"	0	0	774	5	5	9
3	Negative	"S tobom bih ostala"	9	2	145	0	2	12
4	Mogul	"Možda baš"	0	0	149	0	0	17
5	Nenad Ćeranić	"Slepa ulica"	0	0	135	0	0	18
6	Betty Boop	"Kvar"	9	3	872	6	9	6
7	Sloba Bajić	"Prečica do dna"	0	0	266	3	3	11
8	Aleksa Jelić and Ana Štajdohar	"Beli jablan"	15	5	1,288	7	12	3
9	Beauty Queens	"Zavet"	30	12	1,749	10	22	1
10	Andrej Ilić Band	"Tijana"	0	0	255	2	2	13
11	Lejla Hot	"Da si tu"	21	6	219	0	6	8
12	Ivana Ćosić	"Kao da hodam"	1	0	68	0	0	20
13	Tamara Nikezić	"Nisi prvi"	5	1	182	0	1	14
14	Dejan Vozlić	"Ako me čuješ"	0	0	230	1	1	15
15	Zana	"U život kockam se..."	0	0	129	0	0	19
16	Marko Vulinović	"Sada ili nikada"	24	8	204	0	8	7
17	Zoe Kida and Zemlja gruva	"Čudesni svetovi"	2	0	527	4	4	10
18	Ognjen and Friends	"Čućemo, čućete..."	26	10	208	0	10	5
19	Denis and Obule	"Bezimena"	0	0	190	0	0	16
20	Jelena Tomašević feat. Bora Dugić	"Oro"	23	7	4,409	12	19	2

Detailed Jury Votes
R/O	Song	V. Maričić	K. Gojković	A. Peković	Total
1	"Iznad nas"	3	2	4	9
2	"Dunav"				0
3	"S tobom bih ostala"	4	3	2	9
4	"Možda baš"				0
5	"Slepa ulica"				0
6	"Kvar"	2	4	3	9
7	"Prečica do dna"				0
8	"Beli jablan"		5	10	15
9	"Zavet"	6	12	12	30
10	"Tijana"				0
11	"Da si tu"	10	6	5	21
12	"Kao da hodam"	1			1
13	"Nisi prvi"	5			5
14	"Ako me čuješ"				0
15	"U život kockam se..."				0
16	"Sada ili nikada"	8	10	6	24
17	"Čudesni svetovi"		1	1	2
18	"Čućemo, čućete..."	12	7	7	26
19	"Bezimena"				0
20	"Oro"	7	8	8	23

==== Final ====
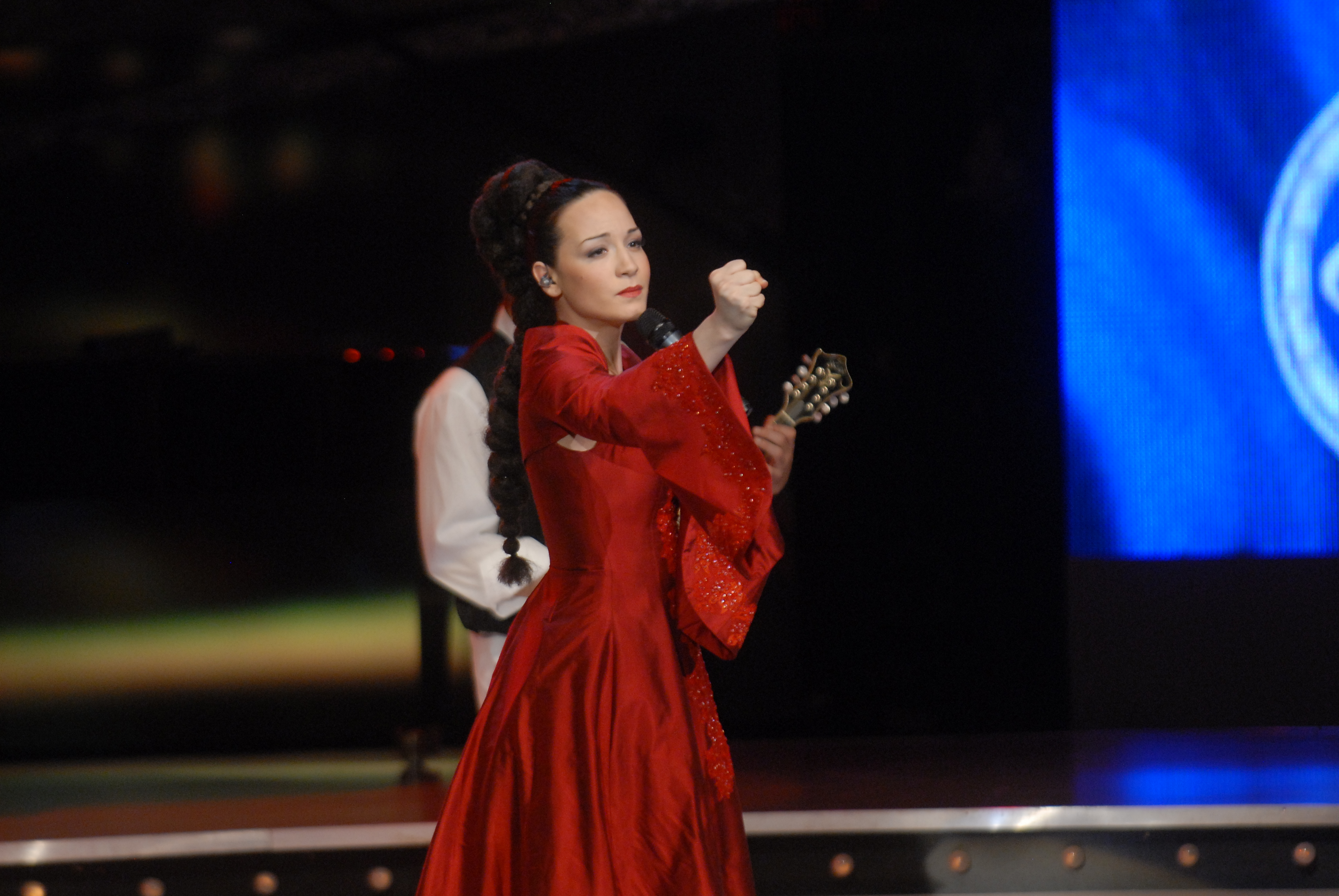
Jelena Tomašević performing "Oro" at the Beovizija 2008 final

The final took place on 10 March 2008 and featured the ten qualifiers from the preceding semi-final. The winner, "Oro" performed by Jelena Tomašević featuring Bora Dugić, was decided by a combination of votes from a jury panel consisting of Petar Janjatović (music journalist), Slobodan Marković (composer) and Nena Kunijević (RTS music editor), and the Serbian public via SMS voting. In addition to the competing entries, the Serbian music industry awards were handed as the interval act.

Final – 10 March 2008
R/O	Artist	Song	Jury		Televote		Total	Place
R/O	Artist	Song	Votes	Points	Votes	Points	Total	Place
1	Betty Boop	"Kvar"	21	7	1,510	6	13	4
2	Beauty Queens	"Zavet"	23	8	3,504	8	16	3
3	Drum'n'Zez	"Dunav"	4	1	1,020	5	6	9
4	Marko Vulinović	"Sada ili nikada"	20	6	311	1	7	7
5	Aleksa Jelić and Ana Štajdohar	"Beli jablan"	23	10	3,634	10	20	2
6	Studio Alektik and Cveta Majtanović	"Iznad nas"	16	4	2,525	7	11	5
7	Jelena Tomašević feat. Bora Dugić	"Oro"	32	12	8,653	12	24	1
8	Ognjen and Friends	"Čućemo, čućete..."	12	3	425	2	5	10
9	Zoe Kida and Zemlja gruva	"Čudesni svetovi"	5	2	784	4	6	8
10	Lejla Hot	"Da si tu"	18	5	732	3	8	6

Detailed Jury Votes
R/O	Song	P. Janjatović	S. Marković	N. Kunijević	Total
1	"Kvar"	5	10	6	21
2	"Zavet"	7	6	10	23
3	"Dunav"	2	1	1	4
4	"Sada ili nikada"	3	12	5	20
5	"Beli jablan"	10	5	8	23
6	"Iznad nas"	8	4	4	16
7	"Oro"	12	8	12	32
8	"Čućemo, čućete"	6	3	3	12
9	"Čudesni svetovi"	1	2	2	5
10	"Da si tu"	4	7	7	18

== At Eurovision ==
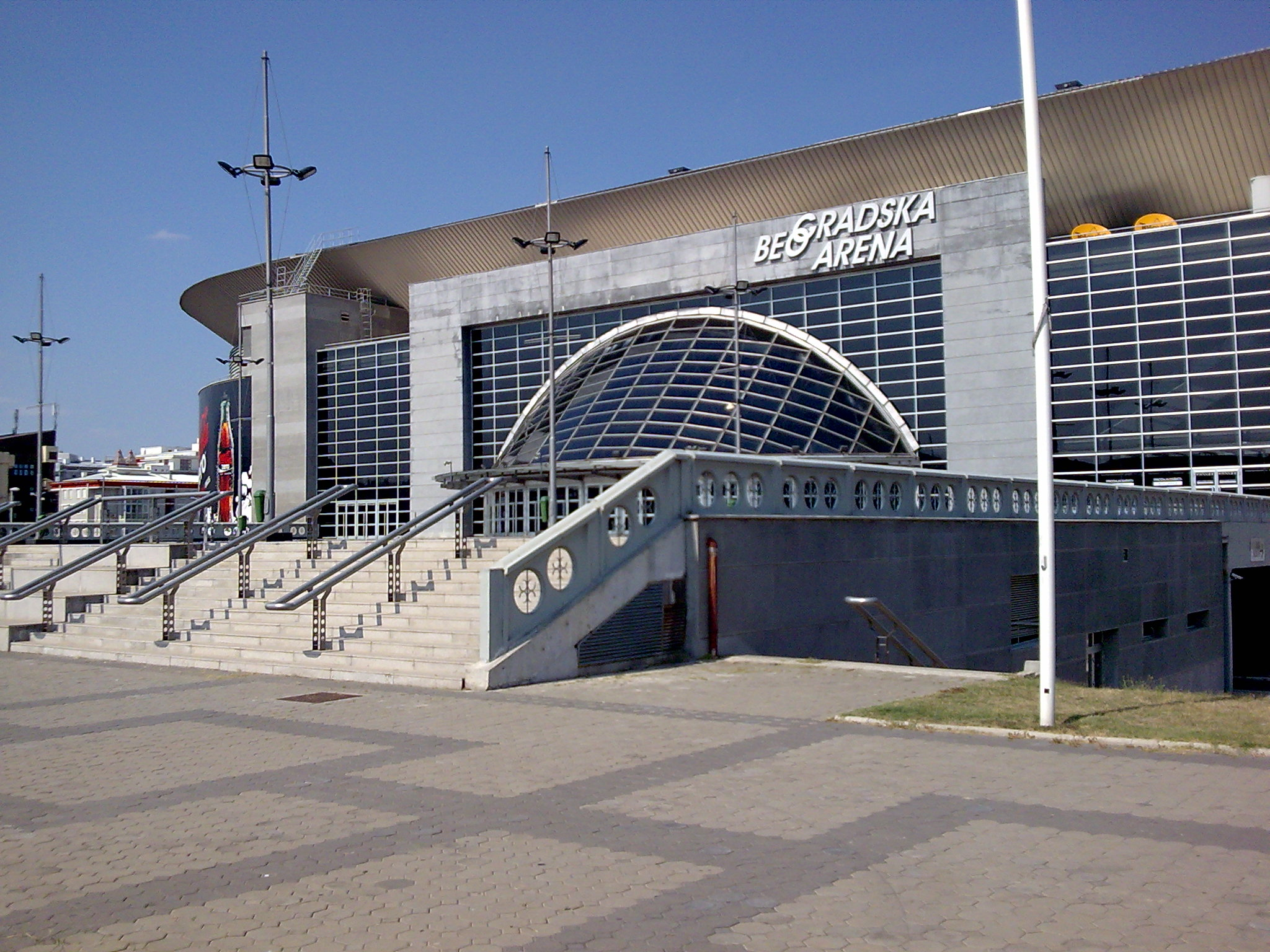
The Eurovision Song Contest 2008 took place at the Belgrade Arena in Belgrade, Serbia.

It was announced in September 2007 that the competition's format would be expanded to two semi-finals in 2008. According to the rules, all nations with the exceptions of the host country and the "Big Four" (France, Germany, Spain, and the United Kingdom) are required to qualify from one of two semi-finals in order to compete for the final; the top nine songs from each semi-final as determined by televoting progress to the final, and a tenth was determined by back-up juries. As the host country, Serbia automatically qualified to compete in the final on 24 May 2008. The European Broadcasting Union (EBU) split up the competing countries into six different pots based on voting patterns from previous contests, with countries with favourable voting histories put into the same pot. During the semi-final allocation draw on 28 January 2008, Serbia was assigned to broadcast and vote in the second semi-final on 22 May 2008.

The two semi-finals and the final were broadcast in Serbia on RTS 1 and RTS Sat with commentary by Dragoljub Ilić and Mladen Popović. RTS appointed Dušica Spasić as its spokesperson to announce the results of the Serbian televote during the final.

=== Final ===
Jelena Tomašević and Bora Dugić took part in technical rehearsals on 17 and 18 May, followed by dress rehearsals on 23 and 24 May. The running order for the semi-finals and final was decided by through another draw on 17 March 2008 and Serbia was subsequently placed to perform in position 23, following the entry from Spain and before the entry from Russia.

The Serbian performance featured Jelena Tomašević in a grey dress and Bora Dugić performing together with three backing vocalists, two of them which performed a choreographed routine, and a guitarist. The stage lighting and background LED screens predominately displayed dark blue colours. The performance also featured the use of a wind machine. The five backing performers that joined Jelena Tomašević and Bora Dugić on stage were: Aleksandar Sedlar Bogoev, Jelena Đurić, Marko Vulinović and Mirjana Nešković. Serbia placed sixth in the final, scoring 160 points.

=== Voting ===
Below is a breakdown of points awarded to Serbia and awarded by Serbia in the second semi-final and grand final of the contest. The nation awarded its 12 points to Macedonia in the semi-final and to Bosnia and Herzegovina in the final of the contest.

==== Points awarded to Serbia ====
Points awarded to Serbia (Final)
Score	Country
12 points	Bosnia and Herzegovina; Montenegro; Slovenia; Switzerland
10 points	Croatia; Macedonia
8 points	Germany; Netherlands
7 points	France; Hungary; Romania
6 points	Czech Republic; Norway; Sweden
5 points	Albania; Cyprus; Greece
4 points	Bulgaria; Poland; Russia
3 points	Armenia
2 points	Azerbaijan; Iceland
1 point	Belarus; Malta; Moldova

==== Points awarded by Serbia ====
Points awarded by Serbia (Semi-final 2)
Score	Country
12 points	Macedonia
10 points	Croatia
8 points	Ukraine
7 points	Georgia
6 points	Portugal
5 points	Bulgaria
4 points	Hungary
3 points	Sweden
2 points	Latvia
1 point	Cyprus

Points awarded by Serbia (Final)
Score	Country
12 points	Bosnia and Herzegovina
10 points	Russia
8 points	Greece
7 points	Israel
6 points	Ukraine
5 points	Armenia
4 points	Norway
3 points	Croatia
2 points	Sweden
1 point	Portugal

=== Ratings ===
The Eurovision Song Contest 2008 was watched by 3,350,000 people in Serbia, making it the most watched television broadcast of all time in Serbia.
