= Russia in the Eurovision Song Contest 2008 =

- Eurovision Song Contest 2008
- Country: Russia
- Selection process: Evrovidenie 2008
- Selection date: 9 March 2008

Competing entry
- Song: "Believe"
- Artist: Dima Bilan
- Songwriters: Dima Bilan; Jim Beanz

Placement
- Semi-final result: Qualified (3rd, 135 points)
- Final result: 1st, 272 points

Participation chronology

Russia participated in and won the Eurovision Song Contest 2008 with the song "Believe", written by Dima Bilan and Jim Beanz, and performed by Bilan. The Russian entry was selected through a national final, Evrovidenie 2008 (Russian: Евровидение 2008) organised by the Russian broadcaster Rossiya Channel (RTR). Russia qualified from the first semi-final and won the contest, placing 1st in the final with 272 points.

== Before Eurovision ==
=== Evrovidenie 2008 ===
Dima Bilan performing at Evrovidenie 2008

Evrovidenie 2008 was the fourth edition of Evrovidenie, the music competition that selects Russia's entry for the Eurovision Song Contest. The show took place on 9 March 2008 at the Akademicheskiy Concert Hall in Moscow and hosted by Oxana Fedorova and Oskar Kuchera. Twenty-seven artists and songs participated and the winner was selected through a jury and a public televote. The show was broadcast on Russia-1, RTR-Planeta as well as online via the broadcaster's website rfn.ru.

==== Competing entries ====
On 8 December 2007, RTR announced a submission period for interested artists and composers to submit their entries between 15 December 2007 and 1 February 2008. The broadcaster received 167 submissions at the conclusion of the deadline. A jury panel evaluated the received submissions and selected the twenty-five finalists for the national final. The competing acts alongside an additional two finalists were announced on 4 March 2008 and among the competing artists were 2002 Russian Eurovision entrants Premyer-Ministr, 2006 Russian Eurovision entrant Dima Bilan, and 2006 Belarusian Eurovision entrant Polina Smolova.

A documentary programme about the Eurovision Song Contest was produced and aired on Russia-1 in the lead up to the national final, while Muz-TV and Love Radio presented the finalists to the public and covered the preparations of the national final.

Artist	Song	Songwriter(s)
A-Sortie	"Colours of My Love"	Kim Breiburg
Aero	"Siberia"	Aero
Aleksandr Panayotov	"Crescent and Cross"	Kim Breiburg, Karen Kavaleryan
Alexey Vorobyov	"New Russian Kalinka"	Vladimir Molchanov, Alexey Vorobyov
Anatoly Alyoshin	"One More Try"	Sasha Lev, Karen Kaveleryan
Anna Mushak and Project William	"The Needle"	Anna Mushak
Asılyar	"Qarlığaçlar" (Карлыгачлар)	Marat Muhin, Mönir Mazunov
Aziya	"Odinokiy dozhd" (Одинокий дождь)	Nalchik Amur Uspaev, Kazbek Shadov
BK!	"Don't Break My Heart"	Boris Khludnev, Pavel Maklay
Dima Bilan	"Believe"	Jim Beanz, Dima Bilan
Granat	"Another Side of Midnight"	Marcel Gonzales, Anastasiya Maximova, Ilya Mazurenko
Helena Gorskaya	"Always All Alone"	Alexandr Grata, Vyacheslav Kokarev
Max Lorens and Satsura	"Day nam dozhd'" (Дай нам дождь)	Seryoga
Natalia Astafyeva	"Tri luny" (Три луны)	Natalia Astafyeva
Natalia Terekhova	"So Can You Tell Me"	Natalia Terekhova
Nora Adam	"Gotta Let It Go"	Gosha Levchenko
Olga Varvus	"King of Seduction"	Olga Varvus
Pierre Narciss and Jam Sheriff	"Who Am I Without Your Love"	Musa Sheriff
Polina Smolova	"Na rasstoyanii dykhanya" (На расстоянии дыхания)	Svetlana Kulemina, Alfred Kin, Sergey Alihanov
Premyer-Ministr	"My parallelniye miry" (Мы параллельные миры)	Taras Demchuk, Irina Stepanova, Denis Khrushchov
Roman Bezhin	"I'm Missing"	Roman Bezhin
Sabrina	"Wreck"	Jim Beanz
Sergey Lazarev	"Flyer"	Rasmus Lindwall, Robert Watts, Mårten Eriksson
Tamila Bloggy	"Sny" (Сны)	Tamila Grishchenko
Yulia Mikhalchik	"Cold Fingers"	Natalia Pavlova, Vladislav Dzyatko
Zhenya Otradnaya	"Porque amor"	Anton Vartanov, P. Sepeda
Zhenya Rasskazova	"Otpuskayu tebya" (Отпускаю тебя)	Sergey Chepurnov

==== Final ====
The final took place on 9 March 2008. Twenty-seven entries competed and the winner, "Believe" performed by Dima Bilan, was determined through a 50/50 combination of votes from a jury panel and public televoting. The jury consisted of Igor Krutoy (composer), Sergey Arhipov (deputy director of Radio Mayak), Maxim Fadeev (composer and producer), Gennady Gokhshtein (executive entertainment producer of Russia-1) and Vladimir Matetsky (singer-songwriter and producer). In addition to the performances of the competing entries, Eurovision Song Contest 2007 winner Marija Šerifović, 2008 Belarusian Eurovision entrant Ruslan Alekhno and 2008 Ukrainian Eurovision entrant Ani Lorak performed as guests.

Final – 9 March 2008
R/O	Artist	Song	Jury	Televote	Total	Place
1	A-Sortie	"Colours of My Love"	17	16	33	11
2	Polina Smolova	"Na rasstoyanii dykhanya"	12	12	24	16
3	Asılyar	"Qarlığaçlar"	1	1	2	27
4	Zhenya Otradnaya	"Porque amor"	25	25	50	3
5	Aero	"Siberia"	3	4	7	24
6	Anna Mushak and Project William	"The Needle"	22	19	41	7
7	Nora Adam	"Gotta Let It Go"	2	2	4	26
8	Natalia Terekhova	"So Can You Tell Me"	6	6	12	22
9	Zhenya Rasskazova	"Otpuskayu tebya"	19	21	40	8
10	Dima Bilan	"Believe"	27	27	54	1
11	Helena Gorskaya	"Always All Alone"	14	13	27	14
12	Aleksandr Panayotov	"Crescent and Cross"	26	26	52	2
13	Pierre Narciss and Jam Sheriff	"Who Am I Without Your Love"	8	8	16	20
14	Yulia Mikhalchik	"Cold Fingers"	21	22	43	6
15	Granat	"Another Side of Midnight"	11	10	21	18
16	Sabrina	"Wreck"	10	9	19	19
17	BK!	"Don't Break My Heart"	5	5	10	23
18	Aziya	"Odinokiy dozhd"	7	7	14	21
19	Tamila Bloggy	"Sny"	18	20	38	9
20	Premyer-Ministr	"My parallelniye miry"	20	18	38	9
21	Anatoly Alyoshin	"One More Try"	13	11	24	16
22	Alexey Vorobyov	"New Russian Kalinka"	23	23	46	5
23	Roman Bezhin	"I'm Missing"	4	3	7	24
24	Sergey Lazarev	"Flyer"	24	24	48	4
25	Natalia Astafyeva	"Tri luny"	15	14	29	13
26	Max Lorens and Satsura	"Day nam dozhd'"	9	17	26	15
27	Olga Varvus	"King of Seduction"	16	15	31	12

== At Eurovision ==
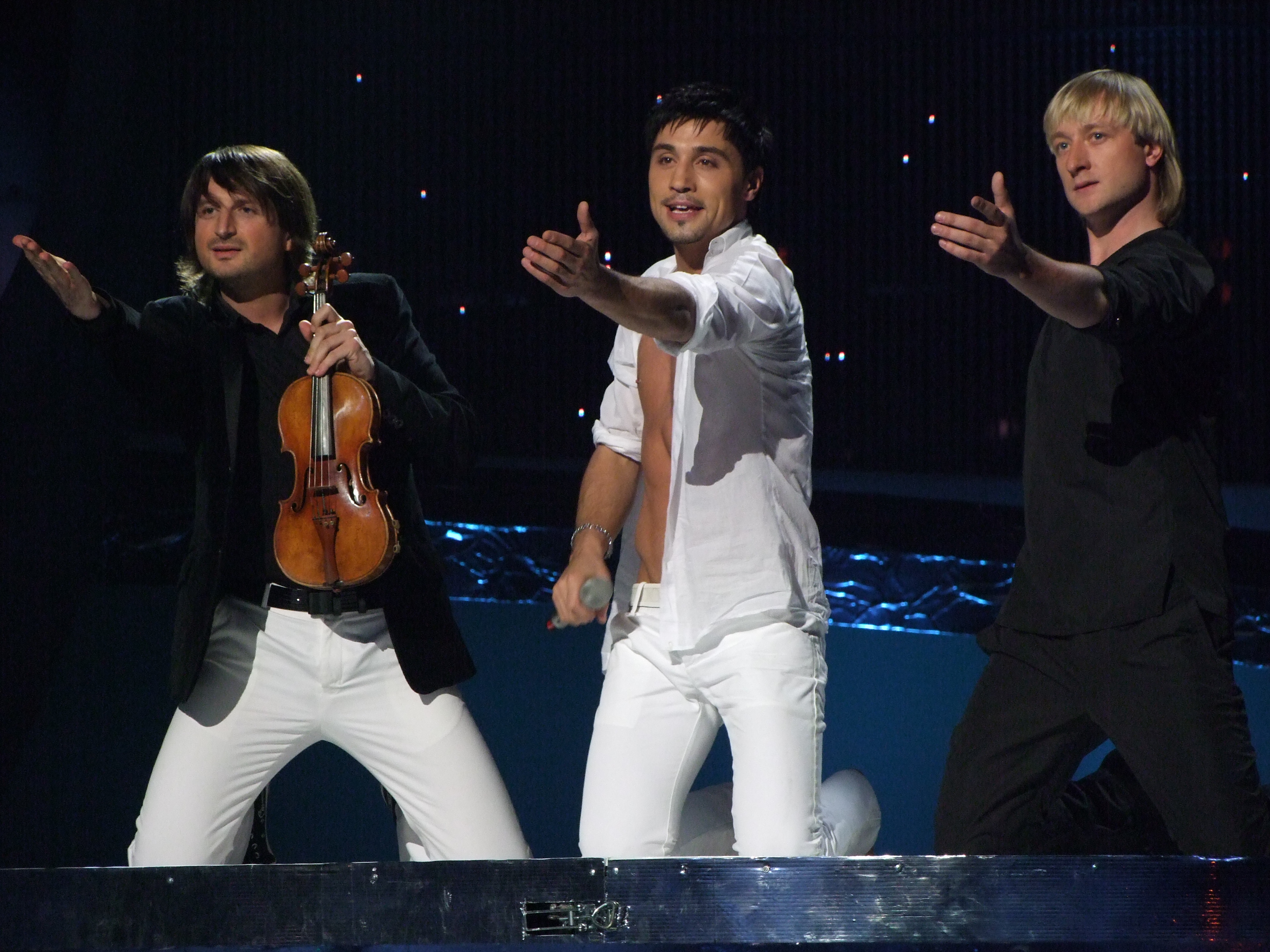
Dima Bilan (centre) with Edvin Marton (left) and Evgeni Plushenko (right) at the first semi-final of the Eurovision Song Contest 2008 in Belgrade

With changes to the format of the Eurovision Song Contest coming into effect in 2008, Russia was required to compete in one of two semi-finals in order to qualify to compete in the final. In the allocation draw on 28 January 2008, Russia was drawn to compete in the first semi-final on 20 May 2008. On 17 March 2008 during the draw for running order, Russia was drawn to receive the third of three wildcards for the first semi-final, allowing the Russian head of delegation to select the starting position for the nation. Russia chose to perform 18th in the first semifinal, following Romania and preceding Greece.

Bilan was joined on stage by figure skater Evgeni Plushenko, who performed on a mobile ice rink placed on stage specifically for the Russian performance, and violinist Edvin Marton, who performed with a Stradivarius. Russia qualified from the first semi-final, placing 3rd and scoring 135 points. During the winners' press conference following the conclusion of the first semi-final broadcast, Russia was drawn to perform 24th in the final following Serbia and preceding Norway. Russia won the 2008 Contest placing 1st and scoring 272 points. As the winning nation of the 2008 Contest and the host of the forthcoming contest, Russia pre-qualified to compete in the final of the Eurovision Song Contest 2009.

The first semi-final and final were broadcast on Telekanal Rossiya, with commentary by Dmitriy Guberniyev and Olga Shelest. The voting spokesperson for Russia was Oxana Fedorova.

=== Voting ===
==== Points awarded to Russia ====
Points awarded to Russia (Semi-final 1)
Score	Country
12 points	Armenia; Israel
10 points	Estonia; Greece
8 points	Azerbaijan; Montenegro; Norway; Poland; Romania
7 points	Bosnia and Herzegovina; Moldova; Slovenia
6 points	Finland; Germany
5 points	Spain
4 points	Andorra; Ireland
3 points	Belgium
2 points	Netherlands
1 point	

Points awarded to Russia (Final)
Score	Country
12 points	Armenia; Belarus; Estonia; Israel; Latvia; Lithuania; Ukraine
10 points	Finland; Hungary; Moldova; Romania; Serbia
8 points	Azerbaijan; Cyprus; Georgia; Malta; Montenegro
7 points	Czech Republic; Germany; Greece; Slovenia
6 points	Albania; Bulgaria; Croatia; Macedonia; Poland; Portugal
5 points	Andorra; Ireland; Norway; Spain; Turkey
4 points	Bosnia and Herzegovina
3 points	Belgium
2 points	
1 point	France; Netherlands

==== Points awarded by Russia ====
Points awarded by Russia (Semi-final 1)
Score	Country
12 points	Armenia
10 points	Azerbaijan
8 points	Israel
7 points	Norway
6 points	Greece
5 points	Moldova
4 points	Finland
3 points	Poland
2 points	Slovenia
1 point	Romania

Points awarded by Russia (Final)
Score	Country
12 points	Armenia
10 points	Azerbaijan
8 points	Ukraine
7 points	Georgia
6 points	Israel
5 points	Norway
4 points	Serbia
3 points	Greece
2 points	Turkey
1 point	Croatia
