= Portugal in the Eurovision Song Contest 2008 =

- Eurovision Song Contest 2008
- Participating broadcaster: Rádio e Televisão de Portugal (RTP)
- Country: Portugal
- Selection process: Festival da Canção 2008
- Selection date: 9 March 2008

Competing entry
- Song: "Senhora do mar (negras águas)"
- Artist: Vânia Fernandes
- Songwriters: Andrej Babić; Carlos Coelho

Placement
- Semi-final result: Qualified (2nd, 120 points)
- Final result: 13th, 69 points

Participation chronology

Portugal was represented at the Eurovision Song Contest 2008 with the song "Senhora do mar (negras águas)", written by Andrej Babić and Carlos Coelho, and performed by Vânia Fernandes. The Portuguese participating broadcaster, Rádio e Televisão de Portugal (RTP), organised the national final Festival da Canção 2008 in order to select its entry for the contest. The competition took place on 9 March 2008 where the winner was selected exclusively by public televoting. "Senhora do mar (negras águas)" performed by Vânia Fernandes emerged as the winner with 17,650 votes.

Portugal was drawn to compete in the second semi-final of the Eurovision Song Contest which took place on 22 May 2008. Performing as the closing entry during the show in position 19, "Senhora do mar (negras águas)" was announced among the 10 qualifying entries of the second semi-final and therefore qualified to compete in the final on 24 May. This marked the first time that Portugal qualified to the final of the Eurovision Song Contest from a semi-final since the introduction of semi-finals in 2004. It was later revealed that Portugal placed second out of the 19 participating countries in the semi-final with 120 points. In the final, Portugal performed in position 13 and placed thirteenth out of the 25 participating countries with 69 points.

== Background ==
Prior to the 2008 contest, Radiotelevisão Portuguesa (RTP) until 2003, and Rádio e Televisão de Portugal (RTP) since 2004, had participated in the Eurovision Song Contest representing Portugal forty-one times since their first entry in 1964. Their highest placing in the contest was sixth, achieved in 1996 with the song "O meu coração não tem cor" performed by Lúcia Moniz. Following the introduction of semi-finals for 2004, Portugal had, to this point, yet to feature in a final. Their least successful result has been last place, which they have achieved on three occasions, most recently in 1997 with the song "Antes do adeus" performed by Célia Lawson. Portugal has also received nul points on two occasions; in 1964 and 1997. They failed to qualify to the final in 2007 with the song "Dança comigo" performed by Sabrina.

As part of its duties as participating broadcaster, RTP organises the selection of its entry in the Eurovision Song Contest and broadcasts the event in the country. The broadcaster confirmed its participation in the 2008 contest on 12 September 2007. RTP has traditionally selected its entry for the contest via the music competition Festival da Canção, with exceptions in 1988 and in 2005 when the entries were internally selected. Despite rumours of an internal selection due to the resignation of the RTP programmes director Nuno Santos, the broadcaster announced on 22 January 2008 the organization of Festival da Canção 2008 in order to select its 2008 entry.

== Before Eurovision ==
=== Festival da Canção 2008 ===
The logo of Festival da Canção 2008

Festival da Canção 2008 was the 44th edition of Festival da Canção organised by RTP to select its entry for the Eurovision Song Contest 2008. Ten entries competed in the competition which took place on 9 March 2008 at the Teatro Camões in Lisbon. The show was hosted by Sílvia Alberto and broadcast on RTP1 and RTP Internacional as well as online via the broadcaster's official website rtp.pt.

==== Competing entries ====
Ten producers were invited by RTP for the competition. The producers worked in coordination with their selected composers on the songs which were required to be created and submitted in Portuguese by 22 February 2008 in its final versions, while its performers were chosen by RTP. The selected producers were revealed between 24 and 30 January 2008, while the competing artists were revealed between 25 January and 15 February 2008.

Artist	Song	Songwriter(s)	Producer(s)
Alex Smith	"Obrigatório ter"	Jan van Dijck, Pedro Malaquias	Jan van Dijck
Big Hit	"Por ti, Portugal"	Fernando Martins, Alexandra Valentim, João Baião	Fernando Martins
Blá Blà Blá	"Magicantasticamente"	Gimba, Luís Miguel Viterbo	Gimba
Carluz Belo	"Cavaleiro da manhã"	Carluz Belo	
Lisboa não sejas francesa	"Porto de encontro"	Miguel Majer, Ricardo Santos	Miguel Majer, Ricardo Santos
Marco Rodrigues	"Em água e sal"	Tiago Machado, Inês Pedrosa	Elvis Veiguinha
Ricardo Soler	"Canção pop"	Renato Júnior, Nuno Markl	Renato Júnior
Tucha	"O poder da mensagem"	Ménito Ramos	
Vanessa	"Do outro lado da vida"	Nuno Feist, Nuno Marques da Silva	Nuno Feist
Vânia Fernandes	"Senhora do mar (negras águas)"	Andrej Babić, Carlos Coelho	Carlos Coelho

==== Final ====
The final took place on 9 March 2008. In addition to performances of the ten competing entries, each of the competing artists performed a cover version of a former Eurovision winning song both solo and as a group (with the songs "Waterloo" by ABBA, "Making Your Mind Up" by Bucks Fizz and "Hallejulah" by Milk and Honey). The winner, "Senhora do mar (negras águas)" performed by Vânia Fernandes, was selected solely by a public televote held in Portugal, France, Spain, Germany, and Switzerland. Be-Dom and Hip Hop BCM performed as the interval acts.

Final – 9 March 2008
Artist	R/O	Song	R/O	Song (Original artists)	Televote	Place
Marco Rodrigues	1	"Em água e sal"	11	"Après toi" (Vicky Leandros)	5,944	3
Carluz Belo	2	"Cavaleiro da manhã"	12	"L'oiseau et l'enfant" (Marie Myriam)	2,049	8
Big Hit	3	"Por ti, Portugal"	13	"Hold Me Now" (Johnny Logan)	2,934	6
Lisboa não sejas francesa	4	"Porto de encontro"	14	"Puppet on a String" (Sandie Shaw)	1,974	9
Vânia Fernandes	5	"Senhora do mar (negras águas)"	15	"Non ho l'età" (Gigliola Cinquetti)	17,650	1
Vanessa	6	"Do outro lado da vida"	16	"Everyway That I Can" (Sertab Erener)	2,622	7
Ricardo Soler	7	"Canção pop"	17	"Ne partez pas sans moi" (Celine Dion)	4,736	4
Alex Smith	8	"Obrigatório ter"	18	"My Number One" (Helena Paparizou)	6,928	2
Tucha	9	"O poder da mensagem"	19	"J'aime la vie" (Sandra Kim)	626	10
Blá Blà Blá	10	"Magicantasticamente"	20	"Save Your Kisses for Me" (Brotherhood of Man)	4,616	5

=== Preparation ===
"Senhora do mar" was released as a CD single as part of Vânia's promotional activities ahead of the contest.

Following Vânia Fernandes's victory at Festival da Canção 2008, the singer filmed the music video for "Senhora do mar (negras águas)" in Madeira and Porto Santo which was presented on 4 April 2008. An English language version of the song, titled "Lady of the Sea", was also recorded. Both the Portuguese and English versions of the song were released on a CD single ahead of the contest, which also included karaoke and instrumental edits and a remix by Portuguese DJ Rui da Silva.

=== Promotion ===
Vânia Fernandes made several appearances across Europe to specifically promote "Senhora do mar (negras águas)" as the Portuguese Eurovision entry. On 5 April, Vânia Fernandes appeared during the Bulgarian BNT 1 morning show Vsichki pred ekrana where she performed together with Mariana Popova, who represented Bulgaria in 2006. She also completed promotional activities in Malta between 27 and 30 April, including a performance of "Senhora do mar (negras águas)" during the NET talk show programme La Qomna Qomna, as well as in Turkey on 29 April where she performed together with Şebnem Paker, who represented Turkey in 1996 and in 1997.

== At Eurovision ==
It was announced in September 2007 that the competition's format would be expanded to two semi-finals in 2008. According to Eurovision rules, all nations with the exceptions of the host country and the "Big Four" (France, Germany, Spain and the United Kingdom) are required to qualify from one of two semi-finals in order to compete for the final; the top nine songs from each semi-final as determined by televoting progress to the final, and a tenth was determined by back-up juries. The European Broadcasting Union (EBU) split up the competing countries into six different pots based on voting patterns from previous contests, with countries with favourable voting histories put into the same pot. On 28 January 2008, a special allocation draw was held which placed each country into one of the two semi-finals. Portugal was placed into the second semi-final, to be held on 22 May 2008. The running order for the semi-finals was decided through another draw on 17 March 2008 and as one of the six wildcard countries, Portugal chose to perform last in position 19, following the entry from Macedonia.

In Portugal, the three shows were broadcast on RTP1 and RTP Internacional with commentary by Isabel Angelino. The second semi-final and the final were broadcast live, while the first semi-final was broadcast on delay. RTP appointed Sabrina, who represented Portugal in 2007, as its spokesperson to announce the Portuguese votes during the final.

=== Semi-final ===
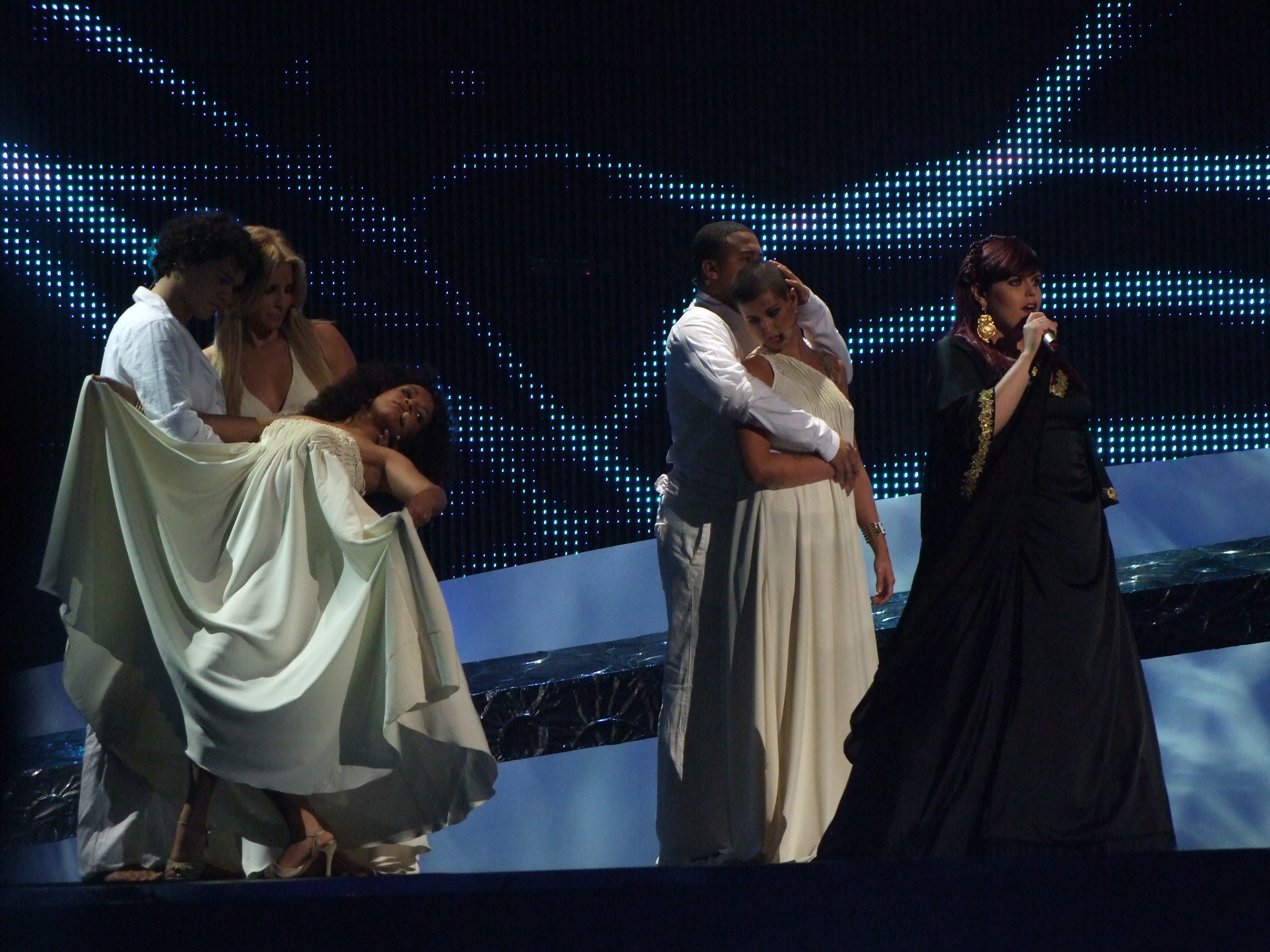
Vânia Fernandes during a rehearsal before the second semi-final

Vânia Fernandes took part in technical rehearsals on 14 and 18 May, followed by dress rehearsals on 21 and 22 May. The Portuguese performance featured Vânia Fernandes wearing a black dress with embroidered elements, designed by Portuguese designer Cátia Castel-Branco. Five backing vocalists were lined up behind Fernandes, dressed in white and performing a routine choreographed by Paulo Jesus: Evelyne Filipe, Jéssica Pereira, Joana Dias, Jonas Lopes and Luís Sousa. The stage lighting displayed blue colours and the LED screens displayed blue waves.

At the end of the show, Portugal was announced as having finished in the top 10 and subsequently qualifying for the grand final. This marked the first time that Portugal qualified to the final of the Eurovision Song Contest from a semi-final since the introduction of semi-finals in 2004. It was later revealed that Portugal placed second in the semi-final, receiving a total of 120 points.

=== Final ===
Shortly after the second semi-final, a winners' press conference was held for the ten qualifying countries. As part of this press conference, the qualifying artists took part in a draw to determine the running order for the final. This draw was done in the order the countries were announced during the semi-final. Portugal was drawn to perform in position 13, following the entry from Turkey and before the entry from Latvia.

Vânia Fernandes once again took part in dress rehearsals on 23 and 24 May before the final. Vânia Fernandes performed a repeat of her semi-final performance during the final on 24 May. At the conclusion of the voting, Portugal finished in thirteenth place with 69 points.

=== Voting ===
Below is a breakdown of points awarded to Portugal and awarded by Portugal in the second semi-final and grand final of the contest. The nation awarded its 12 points to Ukraine in the semi-final and the final of the contest.

==== Points awarded to Portugal ====
Points awarded to Portugal (Semi-final 2)
Score	Country
12 points	France; Switzerland
10 points	Iceland
8 points	Belarus; Croatia; Ukraine
7 points	Czech Republic; Georgia; United Kingdom
6 points	Albania; Hungary; Serbia
5 points	Bulgaria; Sweden
4 points	Lithuania
3 points	Cyprus; Latvia; Malta
2 points	
1 point	

Points awarded to Portugal (Final)
Score	Country
12 points	
10 points	Andorra; Switzerland
8 points	France; Spain
7 points	
6 points	Belgium; Iceland
5 points	Netherlands; San Marino
4 points	Germany
3 points	Croatia; Ukraine
2 points	
1 point	Serbia

==== Points awarded by Portugal ====
Points awarded by Portugal (Semi-final 2)
Score	Country
12 points	Ukraine
10 points	Latvia
8 points	Denmark
7 points	Georgia
6 points	Croatia
5 points	Iceland
4 points	Malta
3 points	Sweden
2 points	Albania
1 point	Bulgaria

Points awarded by Portugal (Final)
Score	Country
12 points	Ukraine
10 points	Spain
8 points	Latvia
7 points	Iceland
6 points	Russia
5 points	Denmark
4 points	Romania
3 points	Croatia
2 points	Norway
1 point	Georgia
