= Always and Forever (Kostas Martakis song) =

Single by Kostas Martakis
- Released: February 6, 2008
- Genre: Pop, rock
- Length: 2:59
- Label: Sony BMG/RCA
- Songwriter: Vicky Gerothodorou
- Producer: Dimitris Kontopoulos

Kostas Martakis singles chronology
"Panta Mazi" (2006)	"Always and Forever" (2008)

"Always and Forever" is a song and CD single by Greek singer Kostas Martakis. It was Martakis's entry in a race to be the Greek representative for the Eurovision Song Contest 2008.

== About ==
It was officially released to the media and radios by ERT on February 6, 2008. The song was Martakis's entry in a three-way race to be Greece's entry in the Eurovision Song Contest 2008. He battled both Kalomoira and Hryspa for the spot, and the final decision was made on February 27, 2008, where Kalomoira won with "Secret Combination". He and Kalomoira's songs were leaked onto the internet on February 3, three days before their official release, although the leaked versions were uncompleted demos. The song was released as a CD single in Greece on March 20, 2008, with Sony BMG and it will be shortly released in Russia too. "Always and Forever" will have three versions: Greek, English, and Russian. For Eurovision, Martakis will sing the Dance version of the song, calling it a "Eurovision version". It is composed by Dimitris Kontopoulos with lyrics by Vicky Gerothodorou.

=== OGAE Second Chance ===
"Always and Forever" was chosen by local clubs in Greece to compete in the OGAE Second Chance Contest 2008. The song will go up against other countries' songs that did not make it through their respective national finals. There are twenty-one songs entered and "Always and Forever" will be presented eighth.

=== International Release ===
The international release of the single will be released in Russia at first, and then in other ex-soviet countries as the first single from his upcoming International album by Sony BMG Russia. The CD single will feature the Russian and English versions of the song as well as remixes of the song. One remix will transform it into a dance song, while another will transform it into a ballad. In December 2008, "Always & Forever" was added to popular American retailer Abercrombie & Fitch's store playlist nationwide.

== Track list ==
1. "Always and Forever" (Eurovision version)
2. "Always and Forever" (rock version)
3. "Always and Forever" (ballad version)
4. "Panta Tha Gyrizo Ekei" (Eurovision version)
5. "Panta Tha Gyrizo Ekei" (rock version)

== Release history ==
Region	Date	Label	Format
Greece	February 6, 2008	Sony BMG Greece	Radio single
Greece	February 7, 2008	Sony BMG Greece	Digital download
Greece	March 20, 2008	Sony BMG Greece	CD single
Russia	TBR	Sony BMG Russia	CD single

== Charts ==
Chart (2008)	Peak position
Greek Singles Chart	1

== See also ==
- Greece in the Eurovision Song Contest 2008
