= Anatropi =

Ανατροπη - Anatropi

Studio album by Kostas Martakis
- Released: July 20, 2007
- Genre: Pop, Rock
- Label: Sony BMG Greece/RCA
- Producer: Dimitris Kontopoulos

Kostas Martakis chronology
Ανατροπη - Anatropi (2007)	Pio Konta (2009)

Anatropi: Special Edition

Singles from Ανατροπη - Anatropi
- 1. "Panta Mazi" Released: November 2006; 2. "Thelo Epigontos Diakopes" Released: December 2006; 3. "Nai" Released: 2007; 4. "Gi`afto Hirokrotiste Tin" Released: 2007; 5. "Anatropi" Released: June 2007; 6. "As`tous Na Lene" Released: November 2007; 7. "Onira Megala" Released: January 2008; 8. "Always and Forever/Panta Tha Girizo Eki" Released: March 2008; 9. "Fila Me (Torre de Babel)" Released: September 2008; 10. "Mikri Theoi (feat. Shaya)" Released: December 2008; 11. "Kanenas Allos" Released: January 25, 2009

Anatropi (Greek: Ανατροπή; English: Overturning) is the debut album of the Greek singer Kostas Martakis, released in Greece on July 20, 2007 by Sony BMG Greece. It includes many hit singles like "Anatropi", "Nai", "Astous Na Lene" and "Oneira Megala". In March 2008, the album was repackaged to include the CD single "Always and Forever" and released as Anatropi: Special Edition. It was also re-released a second time as Anatropi: Deluxe Edition by the end of December 2008 to include the Greek version of "Always and Forever" and four new tracks.

== Album background ==
After gaining exposure on the talent show "Dream Show" in 2006, Kostas Martakis soon was signed by Sony BMG Greece and also teamed up with manager Elias Psinakis, who was also a judge on "Dream Show" and had previously managed Sakis Rouvas for 15 years. Soon after, Martakis released his first EP titled "Panta Mazi" (Always together) which contained four tracks off the album.

Released only July 20, 2007 by Sony BMG Greece, Anatropi was Kostas Martakis debut album, following his debut EP "Panta Mazi". Anatropi contained a number of hits including the title track, as well as "Nai", "Gi`afto Hirokrotiste Tin", and "As' Tous Na Lene".

Following Martakis' participation in the national final to represent Greece in the Eurovision Song Contest 2008, the album was re-released as Anatropi: Special Edition on March 20, 2008. The special edition included the gold "Always and Forever" CD-Single as a bonus.

Due to Martakis' service in the Hellenic Navy in the second half of 2008, Anatropi was re-released by the end of December 2008 as Anatropi: Deluxe Edition containing 5 new songs instead of an all new album.

== Track listing ==
- Original release

No.	Title	Lyrics	Length
1.	"Anatropi" (Ανατροπή; Overturning)	Eleana Vrahli; Dimitris Kontopoulos	4:23
2.	"Nai" (Ναι; Yes)	Eleana Vrahli; Giannis Hristodoulopoulos	2:58
3.	"Krisimi Ora" (Κρίσιμη ώρα; Crucial Hour)	Eleana Vrahli; Giannis Hristodoulopoulos	3:25
4.	"San Theos" (Σαν θεός; Like God)	Giannis Mallias; Iordanis Paulou	3:06
5.	"Sirmata Ilektrofora" (Σύρματα ηλεκτροφόρα; Electrifying Wires)		3:55
6.	"Pou Na Se Vro" (Που να σε βρω; Where Should I find You)	Pegasos	3:11
7.	"As’ Tou Na Lene" (Αστους Να Λένε; Let Them Say)		3:17
8.	"Oneira Megala" (Όνειρα Μεγάλα; Big Dreams)	Eleana Vrahli; Giannis Hristodoulopoulos	3:49
9.	"Na Min Xanarthi Kalokeri" (Να Μην Ξανάρθει Καλοκαίρι; Summer Not to Come Again)	Evripos; Nikos Orfanos	2:38
10.	"Thele I Agapi Thisia" (θελε Η Αγάπη Θυσία; Love Needs Sacrifice)	Eleana Vrahli; Giannis Hristodoulopoulos	3:27
11.	"Gi’ Afto Xeirokrotiste Tin (Bisogna Saper Perdere)" (Γι Αυτό Χειροκροτήστε Την; For That Applause Her)	Giannis Doksas; Casia Cin	2:59
12.	"Panta Mazi" (Πάντα Μαζί; Always Together)	Eleana Vrahli; Giannis Hristodoulopoulos	3:46
13.	"Kanenas Allos" (Κανένας Άλλος; Noone Else)	Nikos Gritsis; Dimitris Kontopoulos	3:34
14.	"Adinamia Mou" (Αδυναμία Μου; My Weakness)	Nikolas Nikolaou; Neofitos Neofitou	3:56
15.	"Thelo Epeigontos Diakopes" (Θέλω επειγόντως διακοπές; I Need Vacations Urgently)	Nikos Gritsis; Dimitris Kontopoulos	3:21

- Special Edition (Original release plus CD-Single "Always and Forever")
1. "Always and Forever" (Eurovision version)
2. "Always and Forever" (Rock version)
3. "Always and Forever" (Ballad version)
4. "Panta Tha Gyrizo Ekei" (Eurovision version)
5. "Panta Tha Gyrizo Ekei" (Rock version)
- Deluxe Edition

No.	Title	Lyrics	Length
1.	"Fila Me (Torre de Babel)" (Φίλα με; Kiss Me)		3:30
2.	"Kanenas Allos" (Κανένας Άλλος; Noone Else)	Nikos Gritsis; Dimitris Kontopoulos	3:34
3.	"Thele I Agapi Thisia" (θελε Η Αγάπη Θυσία; Love Needs Scrifice)	Eleana Vrahli; Giannis Hristodoulopoulos	3:27
4.	"Adinamia Mou" (Αδυναμία Μου; My Weakness)	Nikolas Nikolaou; Neofitos Neofitou	3:56
5.	"Anatropi" (Ανατροπή; Overturning)	Eleana Vrahli; Dimitris Kontopoulos	4:23
6.	"As’ Tou Na Lene" (Αστους Να Λένε; Let Them Say)		3:17
7.	"Gi’ Afto Xeirokrotiste Tin (Bisogna Saper Perdere)" (Γι Αυτό Χειροκροτήστε Την; For That Applause Her)	Giannis Doksas; Casia Cin	2:59
8.	"Thelo Epeigontos Diakopes" (Θέλω Επείγοντος Διακοπές; I Need Vacations Urgently)	Nikos Gritsis; Dimitris Kontopoulos	3:21
9.	"Krisimi Ora" (Κρίσιμη ώρα; Crucial Hour)	Eleana Vrahli; Giannis Hristodoulopoulos	3:25
10.	"Mikro Theoi (ft. Shaya )" (Μικρό Θεοί; Little Gods)		3:51
11.	"Na Min Xanarthi Kalokeri" (Να Μην Ξανάρθει Καλοκαίρι; Summer Not to Come Again)	Evripos; Nikos Orfanos	2:38
12.	"Nai" (Ναι; Yes)	Eleana Vrahli; Giannis Hristodoulopoulos	2:58
13.	"Oneira Megala" (Όνειρα Μεγάλα; Big Dreams)	Eleana Vrahli; Giannis Hristodoulopoulos	3:49
14.	"Panta Tha Girizo Ekei" (Rock version)"		3:03
15.	"Panta Mazi" (Πάντα Μαζί; Always Together)	Eleana Vrahli; Giannis Hristodoulopoulos	3:46
16.	"Pou Na Se Vro" (Που να σε βρω; Where Should I Find You)	Pegasos	3:11
17.	"San Theos" (Σαν θεός; Like God)	Giannis Mallias; Iordanis Paulou	3:06
18.	"Sirmata Ilektrofora" (Σύρματα ηλεκτροφόρα; Electrifying Wires)		3:55

There is also an English version of the track "As`tous Na Lene" titled "People Are Talking" which was Kostas' entry in the 2007 "New Wave Festival" taking overall 2nd place.

== Singles ==
"Thelo Epigondos Diakopes"

"Thelo Epigondos Diakopes" was the first single from Anatropi, and was released as on the EP titled Panda Mazi and a radio single in November 2006, prior to the album's release.

"Nai"

"Nai" was the second single from the album, and was released to radio stations in early 2007 and was first made available of the EP Panta Mazi. The song became a radio hit.

"Gi`afto Hirokrotiste Tin"

"Gi`afto Hirokrotiste Tin" was the third single from Anatropi, and was released to radio stations in early 2007 and was first made available on the EP Panta Mazi. The song gained substantial radio airplay, and was included on the compilation Kolasi 2007.

"Anatropi"

"Anatropi" was the fourth single and title track from the album and was released to radio stations in June 2007. It is the first single that was not previously released on the EP Panda Mazi. The song was also as a music video and gained substantial radio airplay over the summer making it a summer radio hit for 2007.

"As' Tous Na Lene"

"As' Tous Na Lene" was the fifth single and was released to radio stations in November 2007. Martakis sang an English-language version of the song titled "People are Talking" as part of his participation at the "New Wave Festival" in 2007 where he won 2nd place. The song did not manage to pick up much radio airplay.

"Onira Megala"

"Onira Megala" was the sixth single and was released to radio stations in January 2008. A music video was filmed for the song in Moscow, Russia.

"Always and Forever/Panta Tha Girizo Eki"

"Always and Forever/Panta Tha Girizo Eki" was the seventh single from Anatropi, and the first from the repacked Special Edition released in June 2008. It was released to radio stations in March 2008, and was Martakis' entry in the national final to represent Greece in the Eurovision Song Contest 2008. Recorded in 3 different English language versions, and 2 different Greek language versions, the song was released as a CD-Single which reached number 1 on the IFPI singles charts and was certified Gold.

"Fila Me"

"Fila Me" was the eighth single from Anatropi, and the first from the re-released Deluxe Edition released in December 2008. It was released to radio stations in September 2008 along with a music video. The song gained substantial radio airplay, and became a summer radio hit.

"Kanenas Allos"

"Kanenas Allos" is the ninth and final single from Anatropi, and was released to radio stations on January 25, 2009.

== Charts and certifications ==
Chart	Provider	Peak position	Certification
Greek Albums Chart	IFPI	9	
Cypriot Album Chart	All Records Top 20	1	Gold
