= Secret Combination =

Secret Combination may refer to:

- "Secret Combination" (song), by Kalomira
- Secret Combination: The Album, by Kalomira
- Secret Combination (Randy Crawford album), 1981
