= Mehri Edo =

Studio album by Chrispa
- Released: November 9, 2009
- Genre: Entehno, rock
- Length: 37:51
- Label: EMI/Minos
- Producer: Stefanos Korkolis

Chrispa chronology
Kathreftis (2007)	Mehri Edo (2009)

Mehri Edo (Greek: Μέχρι Εδώ; English: Until here) is the fifth studio album released by Greek singer, Chrispa. It was released in Greece and Cyprus on November 9, 2009 by Minos EMI and includes eleven tracks in total. Nine of the tracks are new and composed by Stefanos Korkolis, with lyrics by Rebecca Roussi, while there are two covers: the classic Korkolis tracks "Fovithikes" with lyrics by Rebecca Roussi and "Parakseni Agapi" with lyrics by Anta Douka.

== Style ==
The album has a noticeably different style than those preceding with adult sounding and developed vocals. In a February 2009 interview with Espresso Magazine, Chrispa stated that people would see another her and that she was at the most creative phase of her life. She added that the new album would be a surprising change from her previous releases. After seeing the photos from the album's shoot, Espresso Magazine wrote that Chrispa had transformed into a perfectly sexy female, markedly emaciated, with long brown hair and an incredibly bold figure. She posed with little mannerism in revealing clothes and looked ready to put the fire back in the nightlife of Athens.

== Release ==
Mehri Edo was released on October 6, 2009 and is Chrispa's fifth studio album. It is her first release following her participation in the national final to represent Greece at the Eurovision Song Contest 2008, at which she placed third out of the three candidates. "S'Erotevomai" was released as the first single from the album as radio promotion and it fared well, with plays extending all across Greece.

Upon the album's release, Chrispa's record company Minos EMI received complaints regarding the content. Because of a technical flaw from the manufacturer, a batch left the plant which contained tracks of religious chants and hymns, instead of Chrispa. Minos EMI immediately recalled all of the faulty product, while publicly apologizing for the inconvenience and offering to buy back or exchange the defective CDs.

== Track listing ==
1. "S'Erotevomai" (Σ'ερωτεύομαι; I'm falling in love with you) – 4:06
2. "Mehri Edo" (Μέχρι εδώ; Until here) – 3:11
3. "M'afineis" (Μ'αφήνεις; You're leaving me) – 3:06
4. "Pos Boro Na Po S'agapo" (Πως Μπορώ να πω σ'αγαπω; How can I say I love you) – 2:50
5. "Drakos" (Δράκος; Dragon) – 3:14
6. "Dynami Mou, Psyhi Mou" (Δύναμη μου, ψυχή μου; My strength, my soul) – 3:46
7. "Ti Ein'afto Pou Den Iparhi Pia" (Τι είν'αυτο που δεν υπάρχει πια; What is the thing that does not exist anymore) – 3:54
8. "Allos Anthropos" (Άλλος άνθρωπος; A different person) – 3:27
9. "Fovithikes" (Φοβήθηκες; You got scared) – 3:42
10. "Parakseni Agapi" [featuring Stefanos Korkolis] (Παράξενη Αγάπη; Strange love) – 3:05
11. "Mono Gia Sena" (Μόνο για σενα; Just for you) – 3:45

== Personnel ==
- Apostolis Koskinas – guitar
- Dimitris Digi Horianopoulos – timpani, mixing
- Dimitris Panagiotakopoulos – artwork
- Iakovos Kalaitzakis – photography
- Lila Koutsioumari – wardrobe styling
- Kostis Pirenis – guitar
- Manos Spiridakis – bass
- Mihalis Porfiris – cello
- Panos Kallitsis – hair and make-up
- Psi (Frontal Attack) – programming, sound design
- Stefanos Korkolis – keyboard, piano, production, s-bass
- Thalassa – string ensemble
- Thimios Papadopoulos – wind
- Thodoris Hrisanthopoulos – mastering
