= Paizeis? =

Studio album by Kalomira
- Released: 29 November 2005
- Genre: Pop, dance, pop rock
- Label: Heaven Music
- Producer: Konstadinos Padzis, Giannis Stigkas, Harry K, Ilias Filippou, Kaiti Boni, Giannis Liodos, Kostas Celeste, Bo, Tereza, Kalomira

Kalomira chronology
Kalomira Special Karaoke Edition (2005)	Paizeis? (2005)	I Kalomira Paei Cinema (2006)

Singles from Paizeis?
- 1. "Paizeis?" Released: November 25, 2005; 2. "Ki olo perimeno" Released: March 2006

Paizeis? (Greek: Παίζεις?; English: You play?) is the second album by the popular Greek-American artist Kalomira that was released on November 29, 2005 by Heaven Music.

== Track listing ==
1. "Ki olo perimeno" (Music & Lyrics: Giannis Stigas) – 3:55
2. "Tora" (Music: Harry K, Lyrics: Elias Philippou) – 3:47
3. "Einai vradies" (Music: Harry K, Lyrics: Elias Philippou) – 3:03
4. "Paizeis?" (Music: Konstantinos Pantzis, Lyrics: Kaiti Bony) – 3:20
5. "Mystiko" (Music: Konstantinos Pantzis, Lyrics: Giannis Liontos) – 2:54
6. "Ta party mou ragizoun tin kardia" (Music & Lyrics: Giannis Stigas) – 3:02
7. "Kleise ta matia sou" (Music: Konstantinos Pantzis, Lyrics: Giannis Liontos) – 2:52
8. "Ena ki ena" (Music & Lyrics: Giannis Stigas) – 3:00
9. "Nihtes fotias" (Music: Kostas Celeste, Lyrics: Elias Philippou) – 3:03
10. "Mia zoi" (Music: Konstantinos Pantzis, Lyrics: Tereza) – 4:47
11. "Rock U Love U" (ft Bo) (Music & Lyrics: Kalomira) – 3:19
12. "Just Want You To Want Me" (Music & Lyrics: Kalomira) – 4:05

== Singles ==
"Paizeis?"

On 25 November 2005 the first single "Paizeis" was released from the album. In addition to the production of a music video, promotional puzzles were given out with από 25 Νοεμβρίου θα παίζουμε (On 25th November we will play) written on them to inform the public of the date of the single's release.

"Ki olo perimeno"

The second single "Ki olo perimeno" was released in March 2006 along with a music video of its own.

== Chart performance ==
Chart	Providers	Peak position
Greek Albums Chart	IFPI	10
Cypriot Albums Chart	All Records Top 20	2
