= Chrispa =

Greek singer (born 1982)

- Also known as: Chrispa (stage name)
- Born: Chrysanthi-Pagona Pytiropoulou; 7 December 1982 (age 43)
- Origin: Athens, Greece
- Genres: Modern laïka
- Occupation: Singer
- Years active: 2003–present
- Labels: Alpha Records (2003); Minos EMI (2004–2012); Loca Records/The Spicy Effect (2012); EMI (2013–present)

Chrysanthi-Pagona Pytiropoulou (Greek: Χρυσάνθη-Παγώνα Πυτιροπούλου; born 7 December 1982), better known as Chrispa (Greek: Χρύσπα) is a Greek singer. She has released five studio albums.

== Early life ==
Chrispa was born Chrisanthi-Pagona Pitiropoulou (Chris-pa) in Athens, Greece on 7 December 1982. At the age of five, she moved to Pireus, Greece where she began to experiment with music and dance. Originally, she had no dream to become a singer, and loved ballet. After thirteen years of ballet, she left it behind partly because of her short height, and pursued musical instruments, taking courses at her school for phonetics, piano and guitar.

Chrispa's singing career began at age 18 when she sang a song with Sofia Vossou at her summer concert in Aegina. Vossou described Chrispa's voice as "very good" and her connections eventually helped Chrispa get a record contract with Alpha Records. Her talent was quickly realized and she sang in more concerts with other popular singers such as Stamatis Gonidis, Labis Livieratos, and Themis Adamantidis.

== Musical career ==
=== 2003–2007: Getting started ===
In the spring of 2003, at the age of 21, Chrispa released her debut album, titled Tora with Alpha Records. The first single from the album, "Esena Thelo", gained radio success and had a music video and remix. Chrispa's next album was the self-titled Chrispa in 2004 with Minos EMI.

A repackaged album was released in 2005, titled Chrispa 100%. The compilation featured hits from her first two albums; a new single, "Mou Kani Plaka O Theos," which became a radio hit; a DVD of her music videos; and remixes. Also from the album were the radio hits "An Den Ipirhes", "Savvatokiriako", "Fevgo Gia To 7", "I Kolasi Eimai Ego", and "Pali Tha Peis Signomi".

2005 also brought several collaborations for Chrispa. She sang with Giorgos Tsalikis and Constantinos Christoforou in the summer, while during the winter of 2005–2006 she went on the road with Elli Kokkinou, the Andreas Stamos, Constantinos Christoforou and Kalomoira.

In 2006 and 2007, she released two more albums, Posa Hrostao and Kathreftis respectively. The first single from Kathreftis is "Mia Stigmi", which was made into a music video.

=== 2008–present: From Eurovision to "Eisai asteri" and "Me skotonei" ===
She was a candidate in the Greek national final to represent Greece in the Eurovision Song Contest 2008. Chrispa had chosen a song composed by Marios Psimopoulos with lyrics by Antonis Papas. The provisional title of the song was "SOS For Love", but later it was changed to "A Chance to Love". The song has an ethnic style, described as a "Dance Oriental", with lyrics in both Greek and English.

At the national final, held on 27 February 2008, Chrispa performed "A Chance to Love" first out of the three participants. She placed third with 15.9% of the vote. Kostas Martakis placed second, and Kalomoira went to Eurovision with "Secret Combination", eventually placing third.

On 6 October 2009, Chrispa released her fifth studio album, titled Mehri Edo. It included eleven new tracks composed by Stefanos Korkolis, with lyrics by Rebecca Roussi. It was reported that Chrispa had expressed dissatisfaction with her label's lack of promotion of the album, and as a result, considered prematurely exiting her contract with Minos EMI.

Since that album, Chrispa has released four digital singles: "Den yposxomai tipota" (I can't make any promises) (2010), "Eisai asteri" (You're a star) (2011), "Kolla 5" (Hi5) (2012) and "Me skotonei" (It's killing me) (2013).

== TV appearances ==
=== Dancing With the Stars ===
Since October 2013, Chrispa has appeared as a contestant on the Greek Dancing with the stars. Though the judges appear to be very harsh on her, giving her low scores, she has managed to remain in the game as a result of the game's televoting. It is even mentioned on social media that her popularity has increased after the guest judge (Giorgos Liagkas) insulted her.

=== Other TV appearances ===
Chrispa has appeared in many Greek TV shows promoting her songs. In 2009 she guest starred on the Greek sitcom Polikatoikia. She also appeared on the TV show Pame paketo, where she invited her music teacher Sofia Vossou to thank her publicly for believing in her and helping her to have a career. Another notable appearance was on the Greek Big Brother, where she entered the house, as a part of a game, in order to harass the contestants.

== Personal life ==
Chrispa married Panagiotis Nikolaou in July 2010. The two had met a year earlier, and they were engaged a month after meeting. They divorced in 2026.

== Discography ==
=== Albums ===
- 2003: Tora (Greece #49)
- 2004: Chrispa (Greece #32)
- 2006: Posa Hrostao (Greece #1; gold)
- 2007: Kathreftis (Greece #6)
- 2009: Mehri Edo

=== CD singles ===
- 2004: "Mou Kani Plaka O Theos"
- 2007: "Diki Sou Gia Panta" (Remix)
- 2008: "A Chance to Love"

=== Digital singles ===
- 2004: "Oh God"
- 2005: "Boro Boro" vs Chiculata feat. Sarbel
- 2008: "Hawaii" feat. Master Tempo
- 2010: "Den Yposhome Tipota"
- 2011: "Eisai Asteri" feat. BO
- 2012: "Kolla 5"
- 2013: "Me skotonei"
- 2014: "Den Erotevome" ("Ola Kala")
- 2015: "Den Ektimas Me Tipota"
- 2016: "Etimasou"
- 2016: "Ta' Theles"
- 2017: "Aladdin"
- 2018: "Kane Oneira"
- 2019: "Eheis Trelathei"

== See also ==
- Greece in the Eurovision Song Contest 2008
