= Secret Combination (song) =

Song by Greek American singer Kalomira

Single by Kalomira

from the album Secret Combination
- Released: 26 February 2008
- Genre: Pop; R&B
- Length: 3:02
- Label: Heaven
- Composer: Konstantinos Pantzis
- Lyricist: Poseidonas Giannopoulos

Kalomira singles chronology
| "Gine Mazi Mou Paidi" (2006) | "Secret Combination" (2008) | "Please Don't Break My Heart" (2010) |

Music video
- "Secret Combination" on YouTube

Eurovision Song Contest 2008 entry
- Country: Greece
- Artist: Kalomira
- Language: English
- Composer: Konstantinos Pantzis
- Lyricist: Poseidonas Giannopoulos

Finals performance
- Semi-final result: 1st
- Semi-final points: 156
- Final result: 3rd
- Final points: 218

Entry chronology
- ◄ "Yassou Maria" (2007)
- "This Is Our Night" (2009) ►

Official performance video
- "Secret Combination (Final) on YouTube

"Secret Combination" is a song by Greek-American singer Kalomira. Described as an American production of "perky pop" and R&B, the track was composed by Poseidonas Giannopoulos with lyrics by Konstantinos Pantzis. It was released on 26 February 2008 by Heaven Music and served as the first single released from Kalomira's fourth studio album, Secret Combination: The Album. The song was the Greek entry at the Eurovision Song Contest 2008, held in Belgrade, where it placed third behind Russia and Ukraine.

To promote the song, a music video was created and Kalomira performed in a promotional tour in advance of her Eurovision appearance, visiting Azerbaijan, Romania, and Serbia. The act was sponsored by J.Lo by Jennifer Lopez, which was preparing to launch the clothing line in Europe; Kalomira's attire for performances and the music video was exclusively provided by the brand. Critical response was positive, with the song being described as "infectiously catchy" by Tony Neophytou of London Greek Radio and Swedish newspaper Aftonbladet writing that it was reminiscent of Elena Paparizou, who had previously won the contest for Greece. "Secret Combination" experienced commercial success, peaking at number one in Greece and entering charts in Belgium, Denmark, Finland, Sweden, Ireland, and the United Kingdom.

== Background and composition ==
"Secret Combination" was composed by Konstantinos Pantzis with lyrics by Poseidonas Giannopoulos. Giannopoulos had previously written the lyrics for "Comme ci, comme ça", which represented Cyprus at the Eurovision Song Contest 2007, while Pantzis had worked with Kalomira on her previous two albums. In an interview with ESCToday, Pantzis described "Secret Combination" as an R&B song with an "American production" style. He added that it also incorporates Greek and Mediterranean sounds, such as the toumperleki. It was recorded at Prisma Studio, mixed at the latter studio and C&C Studio, Athens, and mastered by Leon Zervos at Sterling Sound Studios, New York City.

The song was officially released to media by the Hellenic Broadcasting Corporation (ERT) at a press conference held at the Athens Hilton Hotel on 6 February 2008. The press conference served as a precursor to the three-participant national final to select the Greek entry for the Eurovision Song Contest 2008. At the national final, held on 27 February, the song competed against two others in the running to become the Greek entry. It was released as a digital download on 26 February 2008 and as an EP with remixes on 1 April 2008. Kalomira had stated that she planned to record a Greek-language version of "Secret Combination" after the contest, though it did not materialize. The song served as Kalomira's first and only single from Secret Combination: The Album.

== Reception ==
Michael Osborn, the entertainment reporter from BBC News described it as "a perky pop song with a definite Greek flavour", while Sweden's Aftonbladet referred to it as "bouzouki pop" reminiscent of Elena Paparizou (Greece's 2005 contest winner). In the Greek-British newspaper Eleftheria, Tony Neophytou of London Greek Radio described the song as "infectiously catchy" and "ethno R&B" and it reached number one on the station's Top 20 Chart.

On national charts, "Secret Combination" peaked at number 1 in Greece, and charted in several Scandinavian countries, including in Denmark and Finland at number 29, and in Sweden at number 38. Elsewhere in Europe, it peaked at number 46 in Ireland, 71 in the United Kingdom, and 18 on the Belgian Ultratip Chart in the Flanders region.

== Music video and promotion ==
Greece's entry was sponsored by the J.Lo by Jennifer Lopez clothing brand, which was preparing to launch in Europe; as part of the deal, J.Lo was the exclusive designer of Kalomira's attire. The music video shooting was done in-studio and lasted nearly twenty consecutive hours under the guidance of director Kostas Kapetanidis. The choreography was created by Ivan Svitailof, the styling by George Segredaki and Constantine Koutsomichou, while Dimitris Giannetos was in charge of hair and make-up. It premiered on 14 March 2008 during New Hellenic Television's (NET) evening news program, while international fans were able to view it through a satellite broadcast on ERT World. Sometimes alone, sometimes flanked by dancers, Kalomira dances and sings while wearing clothing from the collection of J.Lo by Jennifer Lopez. In some scenes of the video, impressive objects with bright colors such as a red Ducati motor bike, a huge disco ball, and large letters with the title of the song were used. In order to further promote the song, Kalomira completed a promotional tour in advance of the contest, which included performances in Azerbaijan, Romania, Belgrade, and Serbia.

== Eurovision Song Contest ==
=== Ellinikós Telikós 2008 ===
Greece's national broadcaster ERT organised a three-participant national final Ellinikós Telikós 2008 to select its entrant for the Eurovision Song Contest 2008. On 27 February 2008, the final was held at Athinon Arena Music Hall in Athens and saw "Secret Combination" go up against "A Chance to Love" performed by Chrispa and "Always and Forever" performed by Kostas Martakis. Kalomira appeared on stage in a short light pink and black dress, accompanied by four male back up dancers, two of which had appeared with Elena Paparizou in Kyiv in the Eurovision Song Contest 2005. At the start of the show, the four dancers held her up, while she was lying down in their arms. The performance ends with each of the dancers, now shirtless and with one letter painted on each, lining up to spell the word "love". At the end of voting, which consisted of a jury and televote, "Secret Combination" was announced as the winning song, receiving 50.3% of the total vote.

=== In Belgrade ===
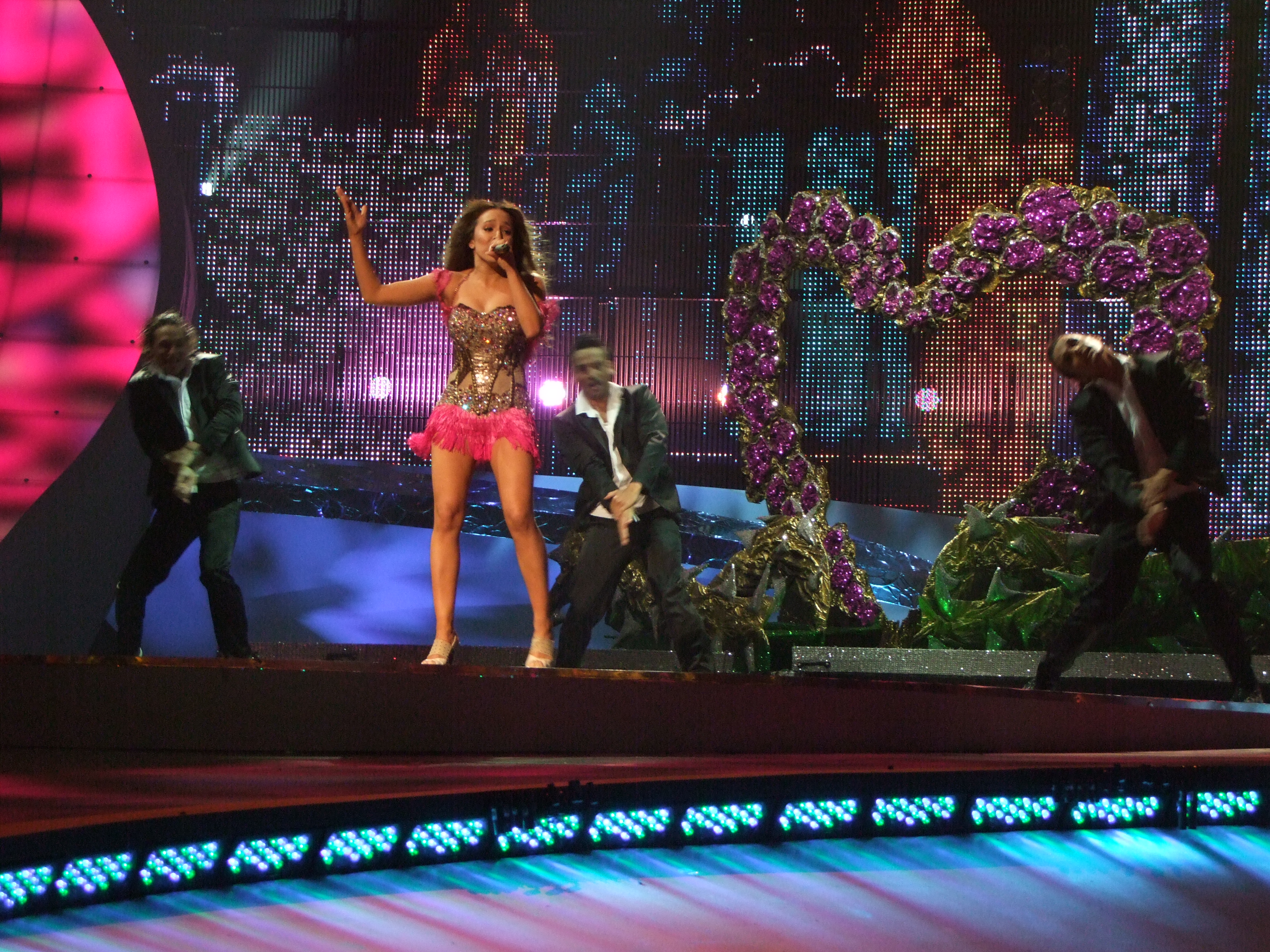
Kalomira performing "Secret Combination" at the Eurovision semi-final.

The Eurovision Song Contest 2008 took place at the Belgrade Arena in Belgrade, Serbia and consisted of two semi-finals on 20 and 22 May, respectively, and the final on 24 May 2008. According to Eurovision rules, all countries, except the host and the "Big Four" (France, Germany, Spain and the United Kingdom), were required to qualify from one semi-final to compete in the final; the top ten countries from each semi-final progressed to the final. For its Eurovision appearance, "Secret Combination" was altered, with minor changes made to the introduction and chorus. Kalomira performed the song 19th (last) in the first semi-final. Kostas Kapetanidis was the artistic director, while Julian Bulku organised the choreography, which included three background dancers; Victoria Halkiti and Nektarios Georgiadis provided backing vocals. There was a large book on stage that Kalomira stepped out of when singing the lyric "an open book". At the same moment, Kalomira who wore a dark pink dress, revealed her second outfit which was a silver shorter dress. "Secret Combination" finished first, receiving 156 points and securing a spot in the final.

Kalomira performed a repeat of her semi-final performance at the Eurovision Final held on 24 May 2008. She presented "Secret Combination" 21st on the night after Azerbaijan and before Spain. Tony Neophytou of London Greek Radio commented that "visually, the presentation was quite addictively enticing, with a stunningly gorgeous Kalomira, her singing/dance capabilities and her three acrobatic male dancers. The purple-heart gimmick carved out of the giant, life-sized book, proving ingenious. The choreographed tsifteteli in the break had induced an amazing visual gambit." Having led initially in the voting, Kalomira finished in third place behind Russia and Ukraine, receiving 218 points. The song received 12 points (the maximum) from United Kingdom, Germany, Albania, San Marino, Cyprus and Romania.

== Track listing ==
- Digital download (Note: This acts as a summary of all versions of the song released for digital download.)
1. "Secret Combination" – 3:02
- EP (Note: This acts as a summary of all versions of the single released as a digital download EP.)
1. "Secret Combination" (Eurovision 2008 Mix) – 3:00
2. "Secret Combination" (Mystic Soumka Mix) – 4:06
3. "Secret Combination" (Electropop Mix) – 3:33
4. "Secret Combination" (Backing Track Mix) – 3:00

== Credits and personnel ==
Credits adapted from liner notes.

Locations

- Recorded and mixed at Prisma Studio (Athens, Greece)
- Mixed C&C Studio (Athens, Greece)
- Mastered at Sterling Sound Studios (New York City, USA)

Personnel

- Kalomira – Lead vocals
- Konstantinos Pantzis – Songwriting
- Poseidonas Giannopoulous – Songwriting
- Leon Zervos – Mastering
- Chris Sigounis – Artwork
- Giorgos Kalfamanolis – Photography
- Billy Petrou – Manager

== Charts ==
| Chart (2008) | Peak position |
|---|---|
| Belgium (Ultratip Bubbling Under Flanders) | 18 |
| Denmark (Tracklisten) | 29 |
| Finland Download (Latauslista) | 29 |
| Greece (Billboard) | 1 |
| Ireland (IRMA) | 46 |
| Sweden (Sverigetopplistan) | 38 |
| UK Singles (OCC) | 71 |

== Release history ==
| Country | Date | Format(s) | Label | Ref. |
|---|---|---|---|---|
| Various | 26 February 2008 | Digital download | Heaven | |
| Various | 1 April 2008 | Digital download (EP) | Heaven | |
