= A Chance to Love =

Single by Chrispa
- Released: February 6, 2008
- Genre: Pop folk
- Length: 2:58
- Label: Minos EMI
- Songwriters: Antonis Papas, Marios Psimopoulos
- Producer: Marios Psimopoulos

"A Chance to Love" is a song and CD single by Greek singer Chrispa. It was Chrispa's entry in a race to be the Greek representative for the Eurovision Song Contest 2008.

== About ==
It was officially released to the media and radios by ERT on February 6, 2008. The song was Chrispa's entry in a three way race to be Greece's entry in the Eurovision Song Contest 2008. She battled both Kalomoira and Kostas Martakis for the spot, and the final decision made on February 27, 2008 sent Kalomoira to the contest. The provisional title of the song was "SOS For Love", but later it was changed to "A Chance to Love". The song is composed by Marios Psimopoulos and is described as Ethnic style, with lyrics by Antonis Papas in both Greek and English. It was released as a digital download on February 11, 2008 by EMI Greece and the CD single was officially released on May 7, 2008.

== Track listing ==
1. "A Chance to Love" - 2:58
2. "A Chance to Love" (Dance Mix) - 4:07
3. "A Chance to Love" (Marios Psimopoulos Remix) - 3:35
4. "Diki Sou Gia Panta" - 3:41

== Release history ==
| Region | Date | Label | Format |
|---|---|---|---|
| Greece | February 6, 2008 | Minos EMI | Radio single |
| Greece | February 11, 2008 | Minos EMI | Digital download |
| Greece | May 7, 2008 | Minos EMI | CD single |

== See also ==
- Greece in the Eurovision Song Contest 2008
