= Entasi =

Studio album by Kostas Martakis
- Released: 5 December 2011
- Genre: Pop, Rock, electronic
- Length: 53:43
- Language: Greek, English
- Label: Universal Music Greece
- Producer: Kostas Martakis (executive), Alex Leon, Alexander Sandrique Pogrebetsky, Alexis Papadimitriou, Beetkraft (Claydee Lupa & Teddy Economou), Dimitris Kontopoulos, Flawless (Vangelis Kostoxenakis & Evan Klimakis), Leonidas Tzitzos, Marios Psimopoulos, Nikos Kouros, Tony Ray, Vasilis M.

Kostas Martakis chronology
| Pio Konta (2009) | Entasi (2011) | An Kapou Kapote (2014) |

Singles from Entasi
- 1. "Os Ta Hristougenna" Released: 7 December 2010; 2. "Agries Diathesis" Released: 18 April 2011; 3. "Sex Indigo (feat. Diana Diaz)" Released: 7 July 2011; 4. "I Agkalia Mou" Released: 14 October 2011; 5. "Entasi" Released: 5 January 2012; 6. "S' Eho Anagi, S' Agapo" Released: 7 July 2012

Entasi (Greek: Ένταση; English: Intensity) is the third studio album by Greek singer Kostas Martakis, released in Greece and Cyprus on 5 December 2011 by Universal Music Greece. The album has fifteen songs in total, including an English language song, two duets, three covers, and one remix.

== Production ==
Marios Psimopoulos produced the most tracks on the album with five songs. Dimitris Kontopoulos and Leonidas Tzitzos each produced two songs. Alex Leon, Tony Ray, Alexis Papadimitriou, Nikos Kouros, and Alexander Sandrique Pogrebetsky produced one song each. Two different producer duos came together for the song "Agries Diathesis" (wild moods): Flawless — composed of Vangelis Kostoxenakis and Evan Klimakis, and Beetkraft — composed of Claydee Lupa and Teddy Economou. Vasilis M. produced the remix track of "I Agkalia Mou" (my embrace).

The composers consist of Psimopoulos (six songs), Kontopoulos and Papadimitriou (two songs each), and Flawless, Beetkraft, Dimitris Fakos, Pogrebetsky, Serge Lama, and Ray (one song each).

The lyricists consist of Aris Ektoras and Vicky Gerothodorou (four songs each), Vagia Kalantzi and Eleni Giannatsoulia (two songs each), and Nektarios Trakgkis, Christina Salti, Vaggelis Konstatinidis, and Pogrebetsky (one song each).

Two cover versions of foreign language songs using Greek lyrics appear on the album: "Nai Sta Apla" (yes to the simple things) and "Pethaino" (I die). "Nai Sta Apla" is covered from Romanian DJ Tony Ray's "La Trompeta" — with Ray also producing Martakis' version, while "Pethaino" is a cover of French singer Serge Lama's "Je Suis Malade". "Gela Kardoula Mou" (laugh my sweatheart) is a cover of Dimitra Papiou. Under his collaboration with Pogrebetsky, Martakis recorded the duet "Sex Indigo" with Russian singer Diana Diez.

== Release ==
The release of Entasi marks Martakis' third studio album, following Pio Konta (2009). Released on 5 December 2011 in Greece and Cyprus, it is his second studio album under Universal Music Greece. The digital release of the album was delayed, having been added to digital download stores on a yet-to-be-announced date in December 2011.

== Promotion ==
MAD TV aد Hellas On-Line (HOL) arranged a live performance previewing songs off the album as part of the tenth edition of the "HOL Web Concerts" live streaming series. On the album's release date, Martakis was a guest on Mega Channel's morning show "Proino Mou", where he also performed.

For the winter 2011–2012 season, Martakis appeared weekly at Posidonio Music Hall in Athens alongside Panos Kiamos and Ivi Adamou in support of Entasi.

== Track listing ==
| No. | Title | Writer(s) | Producer(s) | Length |
|---|---|---|---|---|
| 1. | "I Agkalia Mou" (Η Αγκαλιά Μου; My embrace) | Marios Psimopoulous, Aris Ektoras | Alex Leon | 3:09 |
| 2. | "Entasi" (Ένταση; Intensity) | Dimitris Kontopoulos, Vagia Kalantzi, Ektoras | Kontopoulos | 3:16 |
| 3. | "Agries Diathesis" (Άγριες Διαθέσεις; Wild moods) | Vangelis Kostoxenakis, Evan Klemakis, Claydee Lupa, Teddy Economou, Nektarios Tragkis | Flawless, Beetkraft | 3:24 |
| 4. | "Nai Sta Apla (La Trompeta) vs. Tony Ray" («Ναι» Στα Απλά; "Yes" to the simple things) | Tony Ray, Vicky Gerothodorou | Ray, Psimopoulos | 3:36 |
| 5. | "Zise Ti Stigmi" (Ζήσε Τη Στιγμή; Live the moment) | Kontopoulos, Kalantzi | Kontopoulos | 3:29 |
| 6. | "Pethaino (Je Suis Malade)" (Πεθαίνω; I die) | Serge Lama, Gerothodorou (Greek lyrics) | Alexis Papadimitriou, Nikos Kouros | 4:32 |
| 7. | "S' Eho Anagi, S' Agapo" (Σ' έχω Ανάγκη, Σ' Αγαπω; I'm in need of you, I love you) | Psimopoulos, Gerothodorou | Psimopoulos | 3:41 |
| 8. | "Koritsi Gia Filima (feat. Christina Salti)" (Κορίτσι Για Φίλημα; Girl for kissing) | Psimopoulos, Ektoras, Christina Salti | Psimopoulos | 2:58 |
| 9. | "Kaneis Den Tha Pethanei" (Κανείς Δεν Θα Πεθάνει; Nobody will die) | Dimitris Fakos, Vaggelis Konstantinidis | Leonidas Tzitzos | 3:36 |
| 10. | "Ela Se Mena" (Έλα Σε Μένα; Come to me) | Papadimitriou, Gerothodorou | Tzitzos | 4:00 |
| 11. | "Fimes" (Φήμες; Rumours) | Psimopoulos, Eleni Giannatsoulia | Psimopoulos | 3:25 |
| 12. | "Gela Kardoula Mou" (Γελά Καρδούλα Μου; Laugh my sweetheart) | Papadimitriou, Giannatsoulia | Tzitzos | 4:25 |
| 13. | "Os Ta Hristougenna" (Ως Τα Χριστούγεννα; Until Christmas) | Psimopoulos, Gerothodorou | Psimopoulos | 3:39 |
| 14. | "Sex Indigo (feat. Diana Diez)" | Alexander Sandrique Pogrebetsky | Pogrebetsky | 3:14 |
| 15. | "I Agkalia Mou (Vasilis M. Remix)" (Η Αγκαλιά Μου; My embrace) | Psimopoulous, Ektoras | Vasilis M. | 3:12 |
| Total length: | | | | 53:43 |

== Singles ==
"Os Ta Hristougenna"

The album's lead single, "Os Ta Hristougenna" (until Christmas), is a Christmas-themed song. The song was digitally released on 7 December 2010, a year prior to the album's release.

"Agries Diathesis"

The second single is "Agries Diathesis" (wild moods) and was digitally released on 18 April 2011. A music video directed by Dimitris Skoulos premiered in May 2011. The song charted at number 50 on the 2011 year-end Greek Airplay Chart.

"Sex Indigo"

The third single is the English language duet "Sex Indigo" with Russian singer Diana Diez. The song premiered on 18 March 2011 in its original form, while a Greek-language version titled "Vres Ton Tropo" (find the way) premiered on 28 April 2011, followed by a Spanish-language version (retaining the original English title) on 4 May 2011. The song was digitally released on 7 July 2011, while a music video filmed in Ukraine by Ukrainian director Alan Badoev premiered in July 2011.

"I Agkalia Mou"

The fourth single is "I Agkalia Mou" (my embrace), and was digitally released on 14 October 2011. It is the final single leading up to the release of the album. A music video directed by Vaggelis Tsaousopoulos premiered shortly after.

"Entasi"

The fifth single is the album's title-track, "Entasi"(intensity), and was digitally released on 5 January 2012. It is a dance-pop song written by Dimitris Kontopoulos, Vagia Kalantzi and Agis Ektoras. Martakis guest hosted MAD TV's MadWalk 2012 event, while his performance of "Entasi" served as the opener. The music video was directed by Apollonas Papatheocharis and featured model and television host Vicky Kaya and television host Mairy Synatsaki as guest stars, who were also the headlining hosts of MadWalk 2012.

"S' Eho Anagi, S' Agapo"

The sixth single is "S' Eho Anagi, S' Agapo" (I'm in need of you, I love you), the song was released on 7 July 2012. The music video was directed by Konstantinos Rigos.

== Personnel ==
- Kostas Martakis – executive producer
- Dimitris Skoulos – photography
- U&I – artwork
- Vasilis Stratigos – grooming
- Konstantinos Gkrozos – stylist
- Kostas Kalimeris – mixing
- Aris Mpinis – mixing

== Release history ==
| Region | Date | Label | Format |
|---|---|---|---|
| Greece | 5 December 2011 | Universal Music | CD |
| Cyprus | 5 December 2011 | Universal Music | CD |
| Greece | 5 January 2012 | Universal Music | Digital download |
| Cyprus | 5 January 2012 | Universal Music | Digital download |
