= Please Don't Break My Heart =

Single by Kalomira featuring Fatman Scoop
- Released: 1 May 2010
- Recorded: 2010
- Genre: Europop, reggae fusion
- Length: 4:08
- Label: Heaven Music
- Songwriter(s): Toni Cottura, Torsten Abrolat, Fotios Stefos, Terri Bjerre
- Producer(s): Toni Cottura, Torsten Abrolat, Fotios Stefos

Kalomira singles chronology
"Secret Combination" (2008)	"Please Don't Break My Heart" (2010)	"I Do" (2010)

Fatman Scoop singles chronology
"Behind the Cow" (2007)	"Please Don't Break My Heart" (2010)	"Rock the Boat" (2011)

"Please Don't Break My Heart" is a song by Greek-American singer Kalomira featuring American hip hop artist Fatman Scoop. It serves as first single from her upcoming studio album and was released as a digital download on 1 May 2010. The song was produced by Toni Cottura.

== Promotion ==
Kalomira premiered the song on the Greek version of Dancing with the Stars. She also performed the song together with Fatman Scoop at the 2010 MAD Video Music Awards.

== Music video ==
The music video was shot in April 2010 in Istanbul, Turkey. It premiered on May 20, 2010 via Kalomira's official YouTube account. In the video, Kalomira sings to a photo of her boyfriend and walks around in a fairy-tale setting in a dress before transitioning into an urban setting in hip-hop clothing with scenes of Fatman Scoop rapping alongside her.

== Charts ==
Chart	Peak position
Billboard Greek Singles Chart	8
Greek Airplay Chart	6
