= I Kalomira Paei Cinema =

Studio album by Kalomira
- Released: December 7, 2006
- Genre: Pop, dance, pop rock
- Label: Heaven Music
- Producer: Takis Morakis, Yiannis Spanos, George Mouzakis, Mimis Plessas, Kostas Klavvas, Manolis Hiotis, George Yiannakopoulos, Alekos Sakellarios, George Ikonomidis, Kostas Pretenderis, Akos Daskalopoulos, Hristos Yiannakopoulos, Lefteris Papadopoulos

Kalomira chronology
Paizeis? (2005)	I Kalomira Paei Cinema (2006)	Secret Combination (2008)

Singles from I Kalomira Paei Cinema
- 1. "Medley"

I Kalomira Paei Cinema is a concept album by the popular Greek-American singer Kalomira that was released on December 7, 2006 by Heaven Music. The album contains many popular classic songs from the old Greek Cinema. These songs have been performed by many Greek movie stars like Aliki Vougiouklaki. The album contains also a karaoke DVD. The album failed to match the success of her two previous albums. No singles were produced from the album.

== Track listing ==
1. "Rikο Riko Rikoko (Τ΄ Agori Mou)" – 2:56
2. "Thelo Ta Opa Mou" – 3:27
3. "Makia Makia" – 2:51
4. "Afto To Mambo To Brazilero" – 3:49
5. "Crazy Girl" – 2:44
6. "Eimai Koritsi Zoriko" – 2:44
7. "Eklapsa Hthes" – 3:38
8. "S’ Agapo S' Oles Tis Glosses" – 2:36
9. "Aliki Tsa Tsa Tsa" – 2:44
10. "Sou To’ Pa Mia Kai Dio Kai Tris" – 3:15
11. "Tou Agoriou Apenanti" – 2:46
12. "Laos Kai Kolonaki" – 3:39
13. "Vrehei Pali Apopse" – 2:48
14. "Fountoukaki Mou" – 3:07

== Chart performance ==
Chart	Providers	Peak position
Greek Albums Chart	IFPI	9
Cypriot Album Chart	All Records Top 20	9
