= Kostas Martakis =

Greek singer and model

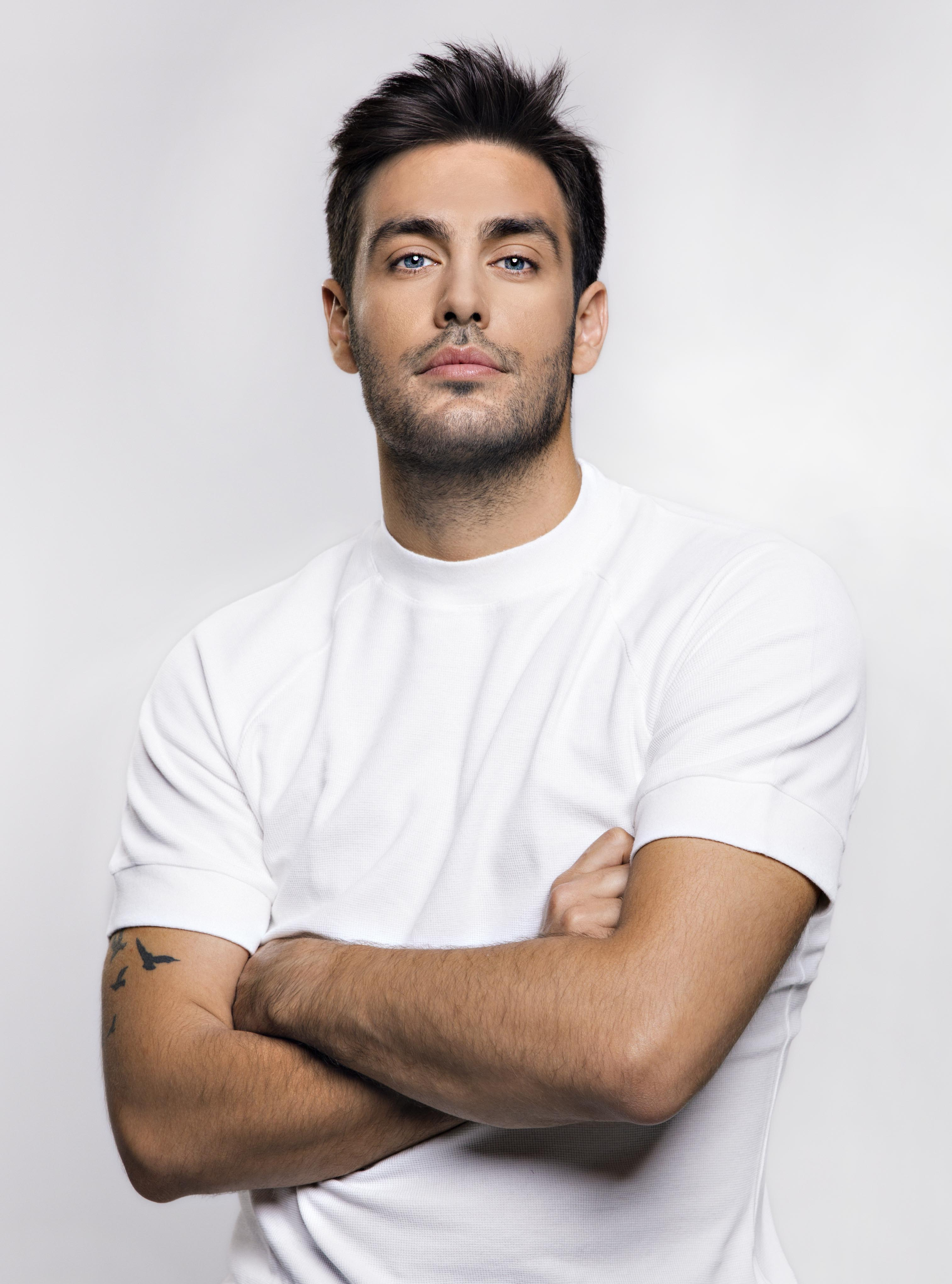

Background information
- Born: Konstantinos Martakis; 25 May 1984 (age 42); Athens, Greece
- Genres: Pop, rock, dance
- Years active: 2006–present
- Labels: Sony BMG Greece (2006–2009); Universal Music Greece (2009–2012); Panik Records (2013-2017); Heaven Music (2018-Present)
- Website: www.martakiskostas.com

Kostas Martakis (Greek: Κώστας Μαρτάκης; born 25 May 1984) is a Greek singer and model who rose to fame after appearing on the Greek talent show Dream Show aired by Alpha TV in 2006. Following his participation, he released five studio albums and also participated in the Greek national final for the Eurovision Song Contest 2008 and 2014. In 2011, he participated in the second season of Greece's Dancing with the Stars, placing second and three years later he was in the backstage host featuring Doukissa Nomikou. In 2013, he took part in the first season of Your Face Sounds Familiar.

== Biography ==
=== Early life ===
Martakis was born on 25 May 1984 in Athens to Nikolaos Martakis and Labrini Lymberopoulou. His father is from Mytilene, while his mother is a Greek-Australian. Martakis has an older sister named Tina and a younger brother Nikos.

=== 2006–2007: Dream Show and debut album ===
Martakis first gained fame on the reality talent show Dream Show. Prior he had also done modelling work and played basketball in the Greek professional leagues where he won medals, as well as majoring in computer technologies at American College of Greece. Shortly after his appearance on Dream Show, he signed a contract with Sony BMG Greece and released his first CD-single in the summer of 2006 titled "Panda Mazi" (Always together). By winter 2006, Martakis was singing alongside Despina Vandi and Giorgos Mazonakis at REX night club, while in summer 2007 he starting singing with Kelly Kelekidou and Dionisis Makris at "Romeo" summer club.

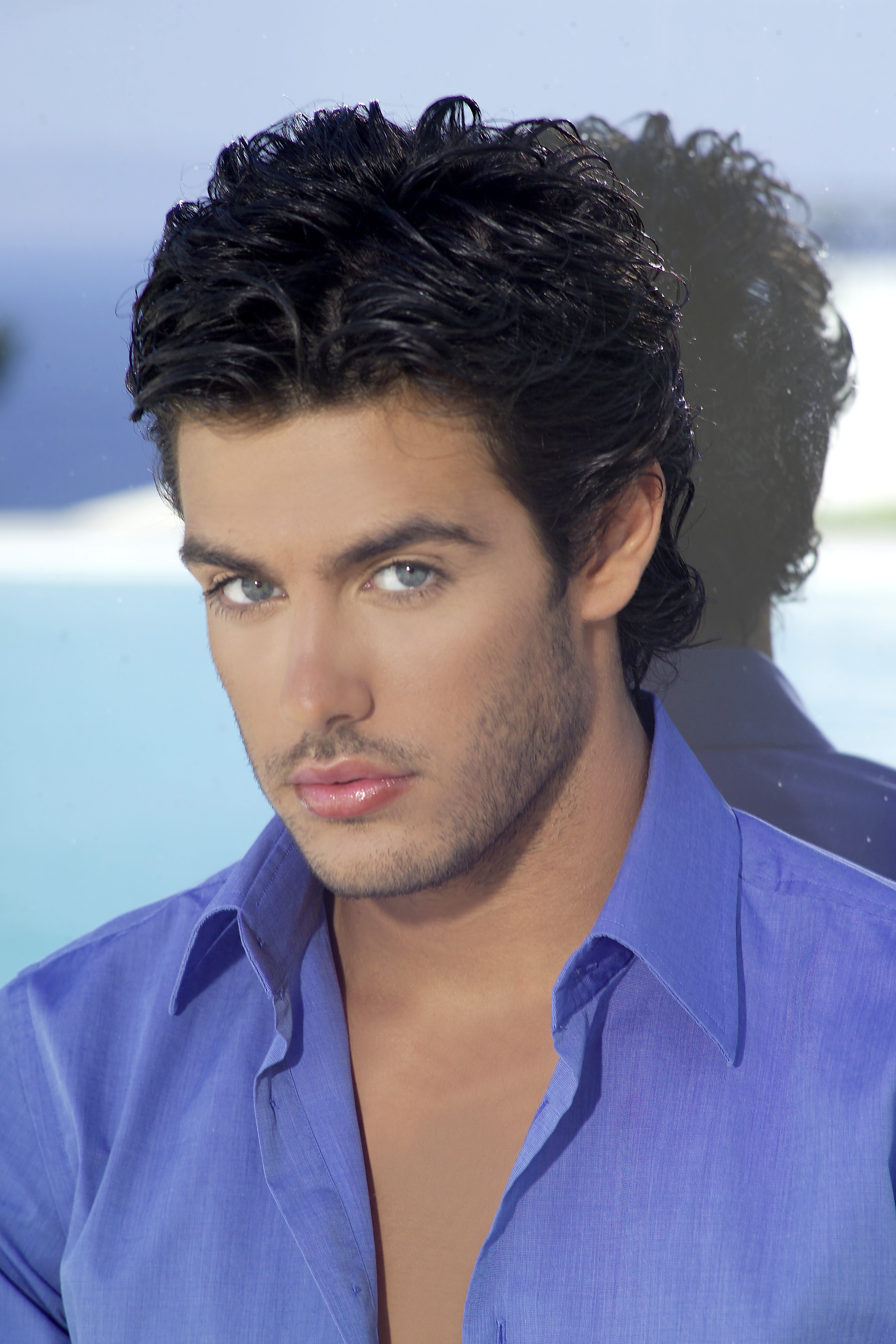
Kostas Martakis at the international music competition New Wave Festival 2007 held in Latvia where he placed 2nd

In June 2007, Martakis released his first studio album titled Anatropi (Reversal). The album was generally well received, leading him to win the award for "Best New Artist" at the MAD Video Music Awards 2007.

In the summer of 2007, he also took part of the international competition New Wave Festival 2007 held in Latvia, where he scored 2nd place, winning 1st place in the public vote. Shortly after, he was booked by Sony BMG Russia to release an English album in all the ex-soviet countries in 2008, although this never materialized and his collaboration with the Russian branch was terminated.

=== 2008: Greece's Eurovision national final ===
Seeing his growing popularity, ERT asked him to compete in the Greek national final for the Eurovision Song Contest 2008. Kostas Martakis competed in the Greek National Final with a song by Dimitris Kontopoulos, with lyrics by Vicky Gerothodorou. The song was "Always and Forever". and it was recorded in two different styles. The pop rock version of the song was originally supposed to be performed at the National Final, but the dance version was chosen instead by Martakis and his label. The winning entrant was "Secret Combination" by Kalomoira, and Martakis' entry "Always and Forever" placed second. Following the Greek national final, a Russian language cover of "Always and Forever" based on the dance version with the title "С тобой навеки" (With you forever) was released in ex-soviet countries, while in December 2008, "Always & Forever" was added to American retailer Abercrombie & Fitch's nationwide US in-store music playlist, thus indirectly introducing the song to the American market.

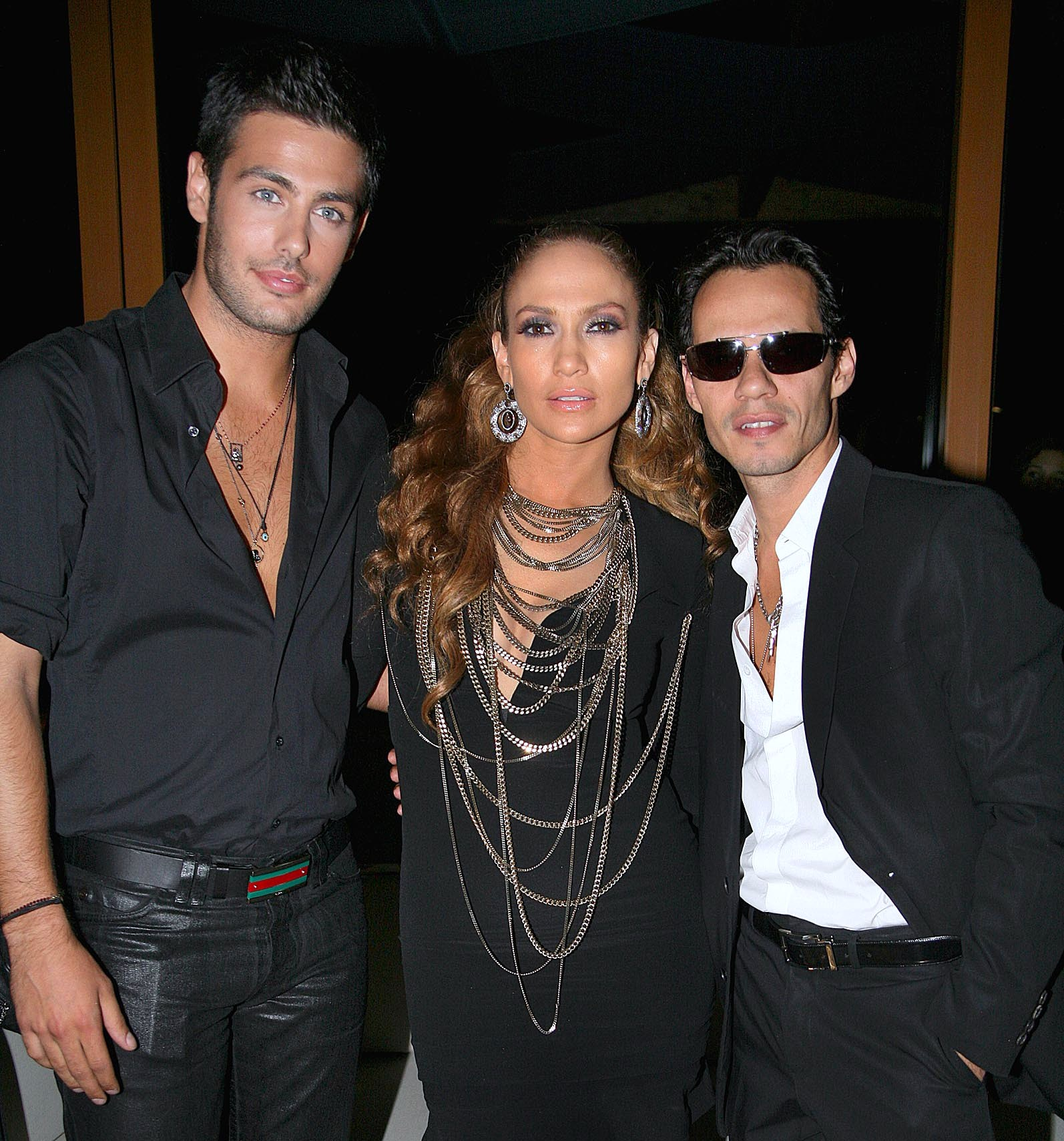
Kostas Martakis with Jennifer Lopez and Marc Anthony in Athens in 2008

In 2008, Kostas Martakis and Danish-Greek singer Shaya were chosen to record a Greek-language version of Right Here, Right Now from the soundtrack of the Disney film High School Musical 3: Senior Year. The cover was titled "Mikroi Theoi" (Little Gods) and was released as a single from the Greek edition of the film's soundtrack, as well as being made into a music video with Martakis and Shaya molded together with scenes from the film. The music video was included as a bonus feature on the Greek edition of the film's home video release. Walt Disney Records, via its international distribution partner EMI, commissioned several local market, foreign-language versions of songs from the entire High School Musical series, although "Mikroi Theoi" was the only Greek version song.

"Fila Me" is another single by Martakis of which was made into a music video and released as a digital single. Martakis then took a break from recording and live shows as he was called to fulfill service in the Hellenic Navy.

In fall 2008, Kostas Martakis was the opening act for the Athens concert of Jennifer Lopez.

=== 2009: Pio Konta ===
In March 2009, it was announced that Kostas Martakis signed with Universal Music Greece. The collaboration with Sony BMG helped spawn nine singles, but his departure from the label in 2009 was on good terms.

In June 2009, Martakis released a song as a digital download single titled "Pio Konta" (Come closer) composed by Swedish producers Holter & Erixson. On November 12, 2009, Martakis released his second studio album titled Pio Konta, which went platinum.

=== 2011: Sex Indigo, Dancing with the Stars and Entasi ===
In early 2011, Martakis participated in the second season of the Greek version of Dancing with the Stars and was partnered with Maria Antimisari. He placed second on the show. In March 2011, he traveled to Moscow to record the duet titled "Sex Indigo" with Russian pop star Diana Diez. A video was shot in Ukraine by the director Alan Badoev, while the song will be included in both artist's new albums. The premiere of song "Sex Indigo" was on March 18, the version of "Sex Indigo" in Greek "Vres Ton Tropo" (Find the Way) was premiered on April 28 and the version of "Sex Indigo" in Spanish was on May 4. The world premieres of the three versions were on the Official Facebook Group of Kostas and the channel of the artist on YouTube, the letter of the Spanish version of "Sex Indigo" was written by Juliana Lira and Fermin Lira, The Sex Indigo video was premiered on July 14 for the ELLO channel and the Russian version was released on November 11 in the Diana Díez channel Official On YouTube.

=== 2012: Entasi, MadWalk and Musical Rent ===
Martakis released his third studio album titled Entasi (Intensity) on December 5, 2011. In the lead up to the album's release, Martakis teamed up with MAD TV and Hellas On-Line (HOL) for a special web concert previewing is new songs on November 24, 2011.

The MadWalk By Vodafone. was held on February 8, 2012 in the Tae Kwon Do arena, the guest host being Martakis who shared the presentation with Viki Kagia and Maria Sinatsaki. and performed with them as in his music video Entasi in the second act.

On February 16, at the theater Veaki, Kostas made his acting debut in the musical Rent. He played the decadent rock star Roger Davis, telling the story of a group of marginalized young people, trying to survive in New York of the 90s, who suffer poverty, love, passion, rejection and loss. The musical was directed by Themidos Marcelou and with the participation of the actors Ada Livitsanou, Antigone Psychrami, Aris Plaskasovitis, Vasilis Axiotis, Christos Georgalis, Themis Marsellou, Stergios Ntaousanakis, Indra Kein, Andreas, and Maria Vasilatou Kapatais.

==== Entries in Ellinikós Telikós and Eurosong ====
Year	Song	Place	Total votes
2008	"Always and Forever"	2nd	33.8%
2014	"Kanenas De Me Stamata"	2nd	28.09%

== Awards and nominations MAD Video Music Awards ==
List of nominations and awards by artist Kostas Martakis musical career 2006.

The 'MAD Video Music Awards' are produced by the television and radio station Greek MAD TV. Although not affiliated with the music industry, are the most important awards of Greece now. Held annually during the month of June since 2004.

Year	Nominated work	Category	Result
2007	Nai	Best Video Clip New Artist	Winner
2007	Thelo Epeigontos Diakopes	Sexiest Artist in Video Clip	Nominated
2008	Anatropi	Sexy Video Clip of the Year	Nominated
2009	Fila Me	Sexy Video Clip of the Year	Nominated
2009	Mikro Theoi (ft. Shaya )	Best Duet	Nominated
2010	Pote	Best Male Artist	Nominated
2010	Pio Konta	Video Clip of the Year	Nominated
2010	Pote	Sexy Video Clip of the Year	Nominated
2010	Pio Konta	Best Video Clip Pop	Nominated
2011	Kano O, ti Thes	Best Male Artist	Nominado
2011	Afto Pou Zitas (ft.Thirio)	Video Clip Hip Hop/Urban	Nominado
2011	Kano O, ti Thes	Fashion Icon in Video Clip	Nominated
2012	Entasi	Best Male Artist	Nominated
2012	Agries Diatheseis	Sexy Video Clip of the Year	Nominated
2012	Entasi	Fashion Icon in VideoClip	Nominated
2013	Mou Pires Kati	Best Male Artist	Nominated
2013	S'exo Anaki S'agapo	Best Video Clip Pop	Nominated
2013	Mamacita Buena	Top 50	Nominated
2014	Ta Kalokairina ta S'agapo	VideoClip Pop	Nominated
2014	Paradise	VideoClip Urban	Nominated
2014	Paradise	Duet	Nominated
2014	An Kapou Kapote	Best Male Artist	Nominated
2014	An Kapou Kapote	Artist Of The Year	Nominated
2014	An Kapou Kapote	Artist Of Cuprys	Winner

== Discography ==
=== Studio albums ===
Year	Title	Certification
2007	Anatropi	Platinum
2009	Pio Konta	Platinum
2011	Entasi	Gold
2013	An Kapou Kapote	Platinum
2016	Sinora	Platinum

=== EPs ===
Title	Album details
Panta Mazi	Released: November, 2006; Label: RCA, Sony BMG; Formats: EP
Always and Forever	Released: February 6, 2008; Label: RCA, Sony BMG; Formats: EP
