= Pio Konta =

Studio album by Kostas Martakis
- Released: 12 November 2009
- Recorded: 2009; Lionheart Studios, Stockholm, Sweden
- Genre: Pop, Rock, electronic
- Length: 37:03
- Language: Greek, English
- Label: Universal Music Greece
- Producer: Mihalis Papathanasiou (executive), Bobby Ljunggren, Boris Konstantinov, Hristodoulos Siganos, Giorgos Papadopoulos, Grigoris Petrakos, Jakob Erixson, Kostas Tournas, Oscar Holter, Sebastian Arman, Vasilis Vlahakis

Kostas Martakis chronology
Anatropi (2007)	Pio Konta (2009)	Entasi (2011)

Singles from Pio Konta
- 1. "Pio Konta" Released: 30 July 2009; 2. "Glyko Koritsi" Released: 5 November 2009; 3. "Pote" Released: 2010; 4. "Agapi Mou (Loving U) [Feat. Desislava]" Released: March 2010; 5. "Kano Oti Thes" Released: June 2010

Pio Konta (Greek: Πιο κοντά; English: Even Closer) is the second album released by Greek singer Kostas Martakis, released in Greece and Cyprus on 12 November 2009 by Universal Music Greece. The album has eleven songs in total, including two English language songs. Furthermore, five songs were recorded and produced at Lionheart Studios in Stockholm, Sweden. The album went gold within four days of its release, and was later certified platinum.

== Production ==
Kostas Martakis collaborated with Swedish duo Holter/Erixson on five songs for the album, which were recorded and produced at Lionheart studios in Stockholm, Sweden. Besides the title track and single "Pio Konta", Holter/Erixson also wrote an English-language version of that song titled "Dance on Me (Dam-Dam)" included as a bonus track, as well as composing three other dance songs on the album. "Diskola Na S'agapo" is produced by Holter/Erixson and Bobby Ljunggren, with music composition by Vasilis Vlahakis.

Kostas Martakis also collaborated with duo Symphonic on the English language duet with Bulgarian singer Desi Slava titled "Agapi Mou (Loving U)". Additional songwriters include Hristodoulos Siganos and Valentino with "Glyko Koritsi" and Giorgos Papadopoulos with "Giati", while singer–songwriters have also contributed, including Greek rock musician Kostas Tournas with "Proti Mou Fora" and Grigoris Petrakos with "Kathe Proi".

== Release ==
The release of Pio Konta marks Kostas Martakis' second studio album. Released on 12 November 2009 in Greece and Cyprus, it is Martakis' first album under his signing with Universal Music Greece.

Beginning in 2009, Universal Music Greece's promotional campaign introduced new album packaging under a fixed price sold through unconventional distribution channels. As a result, the album was released in digipak packaging priced at 9.90 euro, notable for being about half of the average price of a CD album in the Greek market. The physical release was available for purchase at newsstand kiosks, as well as at traditional points of sale. Additionally for its first week of release, it was included as a bonus CD when purchasing the magazine Tiletheatis. The album was once again circulated via print media the following year in May 2010, this time being bundled with newspaper Espresso News.

== Critical reception ==
Professional ratings
Review scores
Source	Rating
Music.net.cy	(favorable)

Popular Cypriot music website music.net.cy proclaimed that Kostas Martakis is raising the bar for Greek pop music, as all eleven tracks have a unique sound under current Greek music standards lending to the fact that some of the tracks were produced in Sweden. They concluded that Martakis is ready to conquer the Greek pop music scene, while calling the album one of the best Greek pop albums of recent years.

== Promotion ==
Leading up to the album's release, Martakis appeared on a number of television shows including "Mes Tin Kali Hara" (with Natalia Germanou) and "Kafes me tin Eleni" (with Eleni Menegaki) on Alpha Channel, as well as a sit down interview with Tatiana Stefanidou on "Axizi Na To Deis" on ANT1, where he also performed some songs off the album. Martakis also appeared on Dromos FM on 12 November 2009 where the station played his new songs over the course of the interview.

For the winter 2009–2010 season, Martakis appeared weekly at club Theatro alongside Nikos Kourkoulis and Aggeliki Iliadi in support of Pio Konta.

== Track listing ==
No.	Title	Lyrics	Music	Length
1.	"Pote" (Ποτέ; Never)	Tasos Vougiatzis	Holter/Erixson	3:28
2.	"Pio Konta" (Πιο κοντά; Even closer)	Vicky Gerothodorou	Holter/Erixson	3:12
3.	"Kano Oti Thes" (Κάνω ό,τι θες; I do whatever you want)	Nikos Gritsis	Holter/Erixson	3:25
4.	"Kathe Proi" (Κάθε πρωί; Every morning)	Grigoris Petrakos	Grigoris Petrakos	3:09
5.	"Proti Mou Fora" (Πρώτη μου φορά; My first time)	Kostas Tournas	Kostas Tournas	3:27
6.	"Gliko Koritsi" (Γλυκό κορίτσι; Sweet girl)	Hristodoulos Siganos, Valentino	Hristodoulos Siganos	3:27
7.	"Giati" (Γιατί; Why)	Giorgos Papadopoulos	Giorgos Papadopoulos	3:07
8.	"I Agapi Einai Edo" (Η αγάπη είναι εδώ; Love is here)	Vicky Gerothodorou	Holter/Erixson	3:22
9.	"Diskolo Na S' Agapo" (Δύσκολο να σ' αγαπώ; Hard to love you)	Alexandra Zakka	Vasilis Vlahakis	3:18
10.	"Agapi Mou (Loving U) [Feat. Desi Slava]" (Αγάπη μου; My love)	Symphonics (Boris Konstantinov, Sebastian Arman)	Symphonics (Boris Konstantinov, Sebastian Arman)	3:58
11.	"Dance On Me (Dam-Dam)"	Holter/Erixson	Holter/Erixson	3:09

== Singles ==
Kostas Martakis "Pio Konta" (Πιο Κοντά)
23 second sample

"Pio Konta"

The lead single is the title-track "Pio Konta" and it was released as a digital download on 30 July 2009. The electronic dance single became a radio hit, topping several radio station charts. The single also marks Martakis' first collaboration with Swedish producer duo Holter/Erixson. A music video was released shortly after on 5 August 2009, premiering on Universal Music Greece's official Youtube channel. Directed by Dimitris Silvestrou, the video showcases Martakis in front of a giant video wall along with various dancers, singing to a woman standing across him. An English-language version of the song titled "Dance On Me (Dam-Dam)" is also included on the album.

"Gliko Koritsi"

The second single, "Gliko Koritsi", was released as a digital download on 5 November 2009. Martakis had also performed this single at his appearance on "Mes Tin Kali Hara" in October. The single did not gain substantial airplay and was generally not presented during Martakis' promotions for the album. The song's folk style is also substantially different from the other songs on the album.

"Pote"

The third single and second music video, "Pote".

"Agapi Mou (Loving You)"

The fourth single, "Agapi Mou, features a music video shot alongside Desi Slava in Bulgaria. The song was also released by Desi Slava in her native country of Bulgaria where it gained popularity.

"Kano Oti Thes"

The fifth and final single, "Kano Oti Thes", features a music video directed by Konstantinos Rigos released on 3 June 2010.

== Personnel ==
- Artemis Papagerakis – photographer
- Dimitris Giannetos – grooming
- Fox design – artwork
- Mihalis Papathanasiou – executive producer, A&R
- Nikos Eftaxias – wardrobe styling
