= Chrispa (album) =

Chrispa Χρύσπα

Studio album by Chrispa
- Released: 6 December 2004
- Genre: Modern laika
- Length: 50:55
- Language: Greek
- Label: Minos EMI
- Producer: Nektarios Kokkinos

Chrispa chronology
Tora (2003)	Chrispa; Χρύσπα (2004)	Posa Hrostao (2006)

Chrispa 100%
- The cover of Chrispa 100%

Chrispa (Greek: Χρύσπα) is the second and selftitled studio album by Greek singer Chrispa. It was released on 6 December 2004 by Minos EMI in Greece, selling over 15,000 units. The album was re-released as 100% on 7 December 2005, one year later, containing a new song by Pegasus, three remixes and a bonus DVD. With its re-release, it received gold certification, surpassing another 15,000 units.

== Tracklist ==
Original edition
No.	Title	Lyrics	Music	Length
1.	"Fevgo Gia To Efta" (Φεύγω Για Το Επτά; I'm Leaving For Seven)	Pegasus	Pegasus	4:17
2.	"An Den Ipirhes" (Αν Δεν Υπήρχες; If You Didn't Exist)	Margarita Droutsa	Marios Psimopoulos	3:51
3.	"Mou Kanei Plaka O Theos" (Μου Κάνει Πλάκα Ο Θεός; God Is Kidding Me)	Pegasus	Pegasus	4:01
4.	"I Kolasi Eimai Ego" (Η Κόλαση Είμαι Εγώ; Hell Is Me)	Pegasus	Pegasus	3:31
5.	"Pes Mou Ston Theo Sou" (Πες Μου Στον Θεό Σου; Tell Me To Your God)	Kosmas	Alexandros Vourazelis	4:43
6.	"Akatallila Oneira" (Ακατάλληλα Όνειρα; Inappropriate Dreams)	Panos Falaras	Marita Chatzidimitriou	4:29
7.	"Savvatokiriako" (Σαββατοκύριακο; Weekend)	Evi Droutsa	Marios Psimopoulos	3:45
8.	"Afise Me" (Άφησε Με; Let Me)	Evi Droutsa	Marios Psimopoulos	4:06
9.	"De Mou Eisai Aparaititos (E Nai)" (Δε Μου Είσαι Απαραίτητος (Ε Ναι); You're Not Necessary To Me (Oh Yes))	Panos Falaras	Marita Chatzidimitriou	3:34
10.	"De Xereis Pote" (Δε Ξέρεις Ποτέ; You Never Know)	Tasos Vougiatzis	Solon Apostolakis	3:27
11.	"Afou De M' Agapas" (Αφού Δε Μ' Αγαπάς; Because You Don't Love Me)	Natalia Germanou	Giorgos Lebesis	3:24
12.	"Aparigoriti Kardia Mou" (Απαρηγόρητη Καρδιά Μου; My Inconsalable Heart)	Evi Droutsa	Marios Psimopoulos	3:56
13.	"Pali Tha Peis Signomi" (Πάλι Θα Πεις Συγνώμη; You'll Say Sorry Again)	Pegasus	Pegasus	4:01
Total length:				50:55

100% edition
No.	Title	Length
1.	"Antres 100%" (Άντρες 100%; Men 100%)	4:00
2.	"Fevgo Gia To Efta" (Φεύγω Για Το Επτά; I'm Leaving For Seven)	4:17
3.	"An Den Ipirhes" (Αν Δεν Υπήρχες; If You Didn't Exist)	3:51
4.	"Mou Kanei Plaka O Theos" (Μου Κάνει Πλάκα Ο Θεός; God Is Kidding Me)	4:01
5.	"I Kolasi Eimai Ego" (Η Κόλαση Είμαι Εγώ; Hell Is Me)	3:31
6.	"Pes Mou Ston Theo Sou" (Πες Μου Στον Θεό Σου; Tell Me To Your God)	4:43
7.	"Akatallila Oneira" (Ακατάλληλα Όνειρα; Inappropriate Dreams)	4:29
8.	"Savvatokiriako" (Σαββατοκύριακο; Weekend)	3:45
9.	"Afise Me" (Άφησε Με; Let Me)	4:06
10.	"De Mou Eisai Aparaititos (E Nai)" (Δε Μου Είσαι Απαραίτητος (Ε Ναι); You're Not Necessary To Me (Oh Yes))	3:34
11.	"De Xereis Pote" (Δε Ξέρεις Ποτέ; You Never Know)	3:27
12.	"Afou De M' Agapas" (Αφού Δε Μ' Αγαπάς; Because You Don't Love Me)	3:24
13.	"Aparigoriti Kardia Mou" (Απαρηγόρητη Καρδιά Μου; My Inconsalable Heart)	3:56
14.	"Pali Tha Peis Signomi" (Πάλι Θα Πεις Συγνώμη; You'll Say Sorry Again)	4:01
15.	"Mou Kanei Plaka O Theos (Gold Dance Remix)"	4:01
16.	"Savvatokiriako (Remix)"	3:55
17.	"Pali Tha Peis Signomi (Dance Remix)"	3:59
Total length:		1:06:50

DVD

1. "Mou Kanei Plaka O Theos"
2. "Fevgo Gia To Epta
3. "An Den Ipirhes"
4. "Documentary / Making Of"

== Singles ==
The following singles were officially released to radio stations, some of them with music videos, and gained airplay:

1. "Mou Kanei Plaka O Theos" (God Is Kidding Me)
2. "Fevgo Gia To Efta" (I'm Leaving For Seven)
3. "An Den Ipirhes" (If You Didn't Exist)
4. "Pali Tha Peis Signomi" (You'll Say Sorry Again)
5. "Antres 100%" (Men 100%)

== Credits ==
Credits adapted from liner notes.

=== Personnel ===
- Dimitris Antoniou – guitars (2, 7, 8, 10, 12)
- Solon Apostolakis – orchestration, programming, keyboards (10)
- Yiannis Bithikotsis – bouzouki, baglama (2, 8, 12) / cura (2, 5, 7, 8, 12)
- Giorgos Chatzopoulos – guitars (5)
- Savvas Christodoulou – guitars (1, 3, 4, 13)
- Akis Diximos – second vocal (2, 8)
- Anna Ioannidou, Katerina Kyriakou, Alex Panayi – backing vocals (1, 3, 6, 10, 12, 13)
- Michalis Kapilidis – drums (1, 3, 4, 13)
- Vaggelis Kontopoulos – bass (1, 3, 4, 13)
- Andreas Mouzakis – drums (2, 7, 8, 10, 12)
- Dimitris Panopoulos – orchestration, programming, keyboards (6, 9, 11)
- Pegasus – orchestration, programming, keyboards (1, 3, 4, 13)
- Marios Psimopoulos – orchestration, programming, keyboards (2, 7, 8, 10, 12)
- Panagiotis Stergiou – bouzouki (1, 3, 4) / baglama (1, 4)
- Giorgos Stratigis – violin (5)
- Giorgos Tzivelekis – bass (2, 7, 8, 10, 12)
- Iraklis Vavatsikas – accordion (1, 4)
- Alexandros Vourazelis – orchestration, programming, keyboards (5)

=== Production ===
- Dimitris Chorianopoulos – sound engineer, mix engineer (5)
- Evaggelia Efthimiou – artwork
- Yiannis Ioannidis (Digital Press Hellas) – mastering
- Panos Kallitsis – hair styling, make up
- Nektarios Kokkinos – production manager
- Vasilis Korres – sound engineer, mix engineer (1, 3, 4, 13)
- Ilias Lakkas – sound engineer, mix engineer (10)
- Lefteris Neromyliotis – mix engineer (2, 6, 7, 8, 9, 11, 12)
- Gavrilis Pantzis – mix engineer (2, 6, 7, 8, 9, 11, 12)
- Thodoris Psiahos – photographer
- Petros Siakavellas (Digital Press Hellas) – mastering
- Dimitris Sotiropoulos – sound engineer (2, 6, 7, 8, 9, 11, 12)
- Giorgos Tzivelekis – sound engineer (2, 6, 7, 8, 9, 11, 12)

== Charts ==
Chrispa made its debut at number 25 on the 'Greece Top 50 Singles' charts.

After its re-release, it was certified gold by IFPI.

Chart	Provider	# weeks	Peak position
Greek Singles Chart	IFPI	19	25
