= Secret Combination: The Album =

Studio album by Kalomira
- Released: May 29, 2008
- Recorded: 2007–2008
- Genre: R&B, pop, electropop, Modern Laïka, funk, pop rock
- Length: 43:35
- Language: English, Greek
- Label: Heaven
- Producer: Kostas Kalimeris/Heaven

Kalomira chronology
I Kalomira Paei Cinema (2006)	Secret Combination: The Album (2008)

Singles from Secret Combination: The Album
- 1. "Secret Combination" Released: February 6, 2008; 2. "Sto Diko Mou Rythmo" Released: August 22, 2008; 3. "Hot" Released: May 2009

Secret Combination: The Album is the fourth studio album by Greek American singer Kalomira which was released at the end of May 2008 by Heaven Music. The album has 12 tracks written by Konstantinos Pantzis, Tasos Vougiatzis and Sunny X.

== Producers and collaborators ==
Kalomira co-operated with very popular and prestigious producers. The writers and composers who participate in the production of the album are: Κonstantinos Pantzis, Sunny X, Tasos Vougiatzis, Poseidonas Giannopoulos, Eftihia Sideri, Marc Eastmont, Nektarios Tirakis and Master Tempo who remixed the song "Secret Combination".

== Promotion ==
Kalomira released her fourth studio album after gaining the third place in the Eurovision Song Contest 2008. She planned on starting the full promotion of the album, but on June 2 2008, when Kalomira was supposed to be the guest on a popular morning show in Greece, she postponed her appearance because she had to fly to New York City immediately, due to her sister's pregnancy. On June 4 2008, Rythmos FM was supposed to throw a summer party where Kalomira would perform all her new songs but this was also postponed, since she was out of the country.

== Dedication ==
The album, just like all of Kalomira's other album releases, has a Thank-You's page. She doesn't forget to thank anyone, but she does state that she dedicates this album to her uncle, who died recently.

== Track listing ==
1. "Secret Combination" - 3:03
2. "Sto Diko Mou Rythmo" (To My Rhythm) - 3:29
3. "All That I Need" - 3:47
4. "Fall to You" - 4:41
5. "S'Agapo" (I Love You) - 3:14
6. "Kathe Fora" (Every time) - 3:41
7. "Money Ain't the Key" (featuring Lisa Lee) - 4:16
8. "Iparhoun Ores" (featuring Peter_D from Master Tempo) (There Are Times) - 3:41
9. "Sto Eipa Hilies Fores" (I've Told You a Thousand Times) - 3:07
10. "Vradiazi" (It's Getting Dark) - 3:38
11. "Hot" - 3:10
12. "Secret Combination" (Master Tempo Mix) - 3:53

== Singles ==
"Secret Combination" was the first and only single to be released from the album. It was first released as a radio single on February 6 2008, and then as a digital download and CD single. The song was Greece's entry in the Eurovision Song Contest 2008.

== Release history ==
Region	Date	Label	Format
Greece	May 29, 2008	Heaven	CD
Greece	May 29, 2008	Heaven	Digital download
Cyprus	May 29, 2008	Heaven	CD

== Chart performance ==
The album entered the Cypriot Albums Chart at number ten, making it her lowest peak there. The album entered at number 20 on the Greek charts.

=== Charts ===
Chart	Provider	Peak position
Greek Albums Chart	IFPI	13
Cypriot Albums Chart	Musical Paradise Top 10	10

=== Singles ===
Single	Chart positions								
Single	Greece	Cyprus	UK	Canada	Europe	Ireland	Turkey	Sweden	Denmark
"Secret Combination"	1	1	71	331	67	46	18	38	29
