= Kalomira (album) =

Studio album by Kalomoira
- Released: September 1, 2004
- Genre: Pop; dance
- Length: 53:36
- Label: Heaven Music
- Producer: Kyriakos Papadopoulos; Hristoforos Germenis; Ekeinos + Ekeinos; Konstadinos Padzis; Dimitris Kodopoulos; Mihalis Papathanasiou; Ilia Filippou; Vasili Giannopoulo; Kosta Stathis; Margarita; Giannis Rentoumis; Andreas Bonatsos

Kalomoira chronology
Kalomira (2004)	Kalomira Special Karaoke Edition (2005)

Singles from Kalomira
- 1. "Nomizeis"; 2. "Ego Eimai I Kalomira"; 3. "Proti Mou Fora"; 4. "Pethaino Gia Sena"

Alternative cover
- Special Karaoke Edition cover

Kalomira is the first album by popular Greek-American artist Kalomira that was released in September, 2004 by Heaven Music. The album was certified Gold.

== Track listing ==
Standard Edition track list

1. "Kathe Mοu Skepsi ...Esi " - 3:07
2. "Someday" - 3:16 (English cover of "Vivir")
3. "Ego Eimai I Kalomira" - 4:11
4. "Nomizeis "- 2:57
5. "Taxi" - 3:24
6. "Pethaino Gia Sena" - 4:13
7. "Proti Mou Fora "- 4:22
8. "Den Endiaferomai" - 3:34
9. "Another One Bites The Dust" - 3:34 (cover of the song with the same name by Queen)
10. "Alitaki" - 3:43
11. "Ego Tha Lipo" - 3:24 (Greek cover of "A Dios le Pido")
12. "Po Po Po!!!" - 2:49
13. "Moro Mou" - 3:14
14. "Me Ponas" - 3:48
15. "Oute Pou Thelo Na Se Do" - 3:57

Special Gold Edition track list

16. "Ego Eimai I Kalomira/mix 2005"
17. "Proti Mou Fora/NV 2005 remix"
18. "Kai Tou Hronou"
19. "Kai Tou Hronou (Acoustic Version)"

== Karaoke version ==
A karaoke DVD titled Kalomira Special Karaoke Edition was released by Heaven Music in September 2005 in Greece. The DVD features an assortment of Kalomira's music videos from Kalomira such as the singles "Nomizeis", "Ego Eimai I Kalomira", "Proti Mou Fora" and "Pethaino Gia Sena" combined with the lyrics of the songs.

1. "Nomizeis" – 2:57
2. "Ego Eimai I Kalomira" – 5:13
3. "Pethaino Gia Sena" – 4:13
4. "Proti Mou Fora" – 4:22
5. "Kathe Mοu Skepsi ...Esi " – 3:07
6. "Kai Tou Hronou" – 2:57
7. "Alitaki" – 3:43
8. "Another One Bites The Dust" – 3:34
9. "Taxi" – 3:24
10. "Someday" – 4:38
11. "Nomizeis (Original)" – 2:57
12. "Proti Mou Fora" – 4:22

== Chart performance ==
Chart	Providers	Peak position	Certification
Greek Albums Chart	IFPI	1	Gold
Cypriot Album Chart	All Records Top 20	1	Gold
