= Gine Mazi Mou Paidi =

Single by Various
- Released: February 2006
- Recorded: January 2006
- Length: 3:32
- Label: Heaven Music
- Songwriter: Thanos Papanikolaou
- Producer: Thanos Papanikolaou

"Gine Mazi Mou Paidi" is a song written by Thanos Papanikolaou in 2006 specifically to raise money for a fundraiser οrganized by ANT1 TV. Many popular presenters, actors, singers and others from the radio station "Rythmos 94.9" participated to the fundraiser to help raise money for the poor and disabled children all over the Greece.

== Track listing ==
No.	Title	Lyrics	Music	Length
1.	"Gine Mazi Mou Paidi"	Thanos Papanikolaou	Thanos Papanikolaou	3:32
2.	"Gine Mazi Mou Paidi"	Thanos Papanikolaou	Thanos Papanikolaou	3:43

== Participants ==
=== First Song ===
- Kalomira
- Kostas Karafotis
- Giorgos Lianos
- Maro Lytra
- Mary Akrivopoulou
- Grigoris Valtinos
- Markella Giannatou
- Kostas Kolkas
- Renia Louizidou
- Evdokia Roumelioti
- Haris Romas
- Niki Kartsona
- Eleonora Meleti
- Makis Pounentis

=== Second Song ===
- Children's Choir of Spiros Lamprou
