= Panta Mazi =

EP by Kostas Martakis
- Released: November 2006 (Greece)
- Genre: Pop, Rock
- Label: Sony BMG/RCA

Kostas Martakis chronology
Panta Mazi (2006)	Anatropi (2007)

Singles from Panta Mazi
- 1. "Thelo Epeigontos Diakopes" Released: July 2006; 2. "Gi' Afto Heirokrotiste Tin" Released: 2006; 3. "Nai" Released: 2007

"Panta Mazi" is an EP and debut release by Greek artist Kostas Martakis released in November 2006 by Sony BMG Greece. All songs are included on his debut album Anatropi which was the following year on July 20, 2007.

== Track listing ==
1. "Gi'afto Hirokrotiste tin" (Bisogna Saper Perdere)
2. "Nai"
3. "Panta Mazi"
4. "Thelo Epigondos Diakopes"

== Charts ==
Chart (2006)	Peak position
Greece IFPI	3
