= Hellas Online =

Hellas Online (hol)
- Type: Public
- Industry: Telecommunications
- Founded: 1993
- Defunct: 2014
- Headquarters: Athens, Greece
- Area served: Greece
- Key people: Dimitris Vassardanis, (CEO) Antonis Kerastaris, (CEO); Konstantinos Kokkalis, Deputy (CEO); Fotis Konstantelos, (CCO); Christina Geronicola, (Corporate Communications Director); George Giannetsos, (Finance Director); Dimitris Gorgias, (Network Engineering & Operations Director); Argyris Diamantis, (IT Director); Eddy Gerekos, (Human Resources Director); Vasilis Kalogiannis, (Customer Operations Director); Nikolaos Zachos, (Head of Legal Department)
- Products: Internet Services Provider, Telecommunications provider and Internet solutions
- Parent: Vodafone Greece

Hellas Online was one of the leading Greek fixed-line telephony service providers based in Athens. Founded in 1993, Hellas Online (hol) was one of the first Internet service providers in Greece offering public dial-up Internet access. It evolved from an ISP to a fixed-line telecommunications services provider offering a broad range of retail, business and wholesale services. In 2006 it became a member of the Intracom Holdings group. Before its dissolution, following its merger with Vodafone in 2014, it had 531,563 LLU subscribers.

== History ==
Hellas Online was founded in 1993 offering dial-up services in the Athens metropolitan area. The dial-up service was then expanded to the rest of Greece using low-toll telephone numbers. In 2006 it was acquired by Intracom and expanded its services to include broadband ADSL and SHDSL services. In 2007 it acquired 100% of Attica Telecom, the largest provider of fiber-optic services in the city of Athens and in June of the same year established a strategic partnership with Vodafone Greece.

In June 2008, Hellas Online merged with Unibrain, a company listed on the Athens Stock Exchange, and became enlisted under the name Hellas Online (HOL).

== Network ==
Hellas Online owns and operates a fiber optic network of approximately 3,500 kilometres (November, 2008). Its core backbone network is the second largest network in Greece after that of OTE, the incumbent operator.

Through its points of presence (PoPs) consisting of physical co-location in unbundled local loops (LLUs) Hellas Online offers extensive population coverage in the metropolitan areas of the two largest cities in Greece, Athens (over 80%) and Thessaloniki (over 70%), and significant population coverage in the rest of Greece.

Hellas Online's extensive proprietary fiber optic network connects the three major Greek cities of Athens, Thessaloniki, and Patras, and covers significant parts of the most densely populated areas of Greece.

Hellas Online's network provides high-capacity connection between its data centres and sites, thus allowing Hellas Online to backhaul high bandwidth cost-effectively to its unbundled local loops, without having to lease capacity from OTE, while in certain cases, enabling Hellas Online to lease its own spare capacity to other Greek or international telecommunications operators.

== Services ==
Hellas Online offers domestic and corporate clients, a complete range of broadband products, comprising internet services, fixed-telephony services, and a combination of the two. In 2009, Hellas launched an IPTV service, featuring access to free-to-air channels, news, information, music, children's and sports programming drawn from around the world and HD on-demand content through its Video Club service.
