= Greece in the Eurovision Song Contest 2008 =

- Eurovision Song Contest 2008
- Participating broadcaster: Hellenic Broadcasting Corporation (ERT)
- Country: Greece
- Selection process: Ellinikós Telikós 2008
- Selection date: 27 February 2008

Competing entry
- Song: "Secret Combination"
- Artist: Kalomira
- Songwriters: Konstantinos Pantzis; Poseidonas Yiannopoulos

Placement
- Semi-final result: Qualified (1st, 156 points)
- Final result: 3rd, 218 points

Participation chronology

Greece was represented at the Eurovision Song Contest 2008 with the song "Secret Combination", written by Konstantinos Pantzis, with lyrics by Poseidonas Giannopoulos, and performed by Kalomira. The Greek participating broadcaster, the Hellenic Broadcasting Corporation (ERT), organised the national final Ellinikós Telikós 2008 to select its entry for the contest. In February 2008, three competing artists—Chrispa, Kostas Martakis, and Kalomira—performed their respective entries live during a televised broadcast watched by nearly two million viewers. "Secret Combination" was selected to represent Greece at the Eurovision Song Contest by a combination of a public televote and panel of judges. It was performed by Kalomira, who is an American singer of Greek descent who had previously won a Greek talent show.

Following a promotional tour of many European cities, "Secret Combination" came first in the first of the Eurovision semi-finals at Belgrade in May, and was seen as a possible competition winner. In Greece's 29th Eurovision appearance on 24 May, "Secret Combination" initially led the voting with full marks from six countries. However, the song ultimately finished third, behind Russia and Ukraine. Greece had previously won the competition in 2005.

== Background ==
Prior to the 2008 contest, Greece had participated in the Eurovision Song Contest twenty-eight times since its first entry in 1974, winning in 2005 with the song "My Number One" performed by Helena Paparizou, and being placed third twice: in 2001 with the song "Die for You" performed by the duo Antique and in 2004 with "Shake It" performed by Sakis Rouvas. Following the introduction of semi-finals for the 2004 contest, Greece has had a top ten placing each year. Their least successful result was in 1998, when they placed 20th with the song "Mia krifi evaisthisia" by Thalassa, receiving only twelve points in total, all from Cyprus.

As part of its duties as participating broadcaster, the Hellenic Broadcasting Corporation (ERT) organises the selection of its entry in the Eurovision Song Contest and broadcasts the event in the country. From 2004 to 2006, ERT had selected high-profile artists internally and set up national finals to choose the song, while in 2007 it held a televised national final to choose both the song and performer. For the 2008 contest, ERT decided again to hold a televised national final after failing to secure a big-name artist. As every other year since his first participation in 2004, ERT asked Sakis Rouvas to represent Greece again, but he did not accept. ERT officials had also approached Elli Kokkinou, but she declined the offer as she was pregnant.

== Before Eurovision ==
=== Ellinikós Telikós 2008 ===
Ellinikós Telikós 2008 was the Greek national final developed by ERT to select its entry for the Eurovision Song Contest 2008. The competition took place on 27 February 2008 at the Athinon Arena Music Hall in Athens (22:00–00:30 CET), hosted by actresses and comedy singers Betty and Mathilde Maggira. The show was televised on NET, ERT World as well as online via the ERT website ert.gr and the official Eurovision Song Contest websites. The national final was watched by an estimated 1.9 million viewers in Greece, topping the programs aired on 27 February 2008 by 45.9% according to AGB Hellas.

==== Competing entries ====
Three artists, all newcomers to the Greek music scene, were invited by ERT to participate in the national final. The three acts: Chrispa, Kalomira, and Kostas Martakis were announced on 17 December 2007. The three competing artists had until 25 January 2008 to submit their songs, which were presented on 6 February 2008 during a press conference held at the Hilton Hotel in Athens. Three days before the press conference, Kalomira and Kostas Martakis' songs were leaked via the internet.

Chrispa's record label, Minos EMI, chose a song composed by Marios Psimopoulos with lyrics by Antonis Pappas. Antonis Pappas had previously written lyrics for the Greek entries "Pia prosefhi" by Elina Konstantopoulou in 1995 and "Die for You" by Antique in 2001. The provisional title of the song was "SOS for Love", but it was later changed to "A Chance to Love". The song has an ethnic style, described as a "Dance Oriental", with lyrics in both Greek and English. Kostas Martakis and his record label, Sony BMG Greece, chose "Always and Forever", a song composed by Dimitris Kontopoulos with lyrics by Vicky Gerothodorou. Kontopoulos is known for his dance-pop songs and had previously submitted songs to past national finals including "Welcome to the Party" for Anna Vissi in 2006. The song was originally presented at the ERT press conference in its original form as a pop song with a rock feel to it, but for the national final he sang a dance version of it. Kalomira, and her record company Heaven Music, had several submissions, from which they chose "Secret Combination", an upbeat R&B song composed by Konstantinos Pantzis with lyrics by Poseidonas Giannopoulos. Though the song had an American production style, it did contain some Greek musical elements, such as the use of a darbuka (Greek hand drum) with a western rhythm. Giannopoulos also wrote lyrics for "Comme ci, comme ça" (who represented Cyprus in 2007), while Pantzis has written over 300 songs, some of which have been featured on over 17 platinum and 25 gold certified albums.

==== Final ====
The final took place on 27 February 2008. Three songs competed and the winner, "Secret Combination" performed by Kalomira, was selected by a combination of public voting (60%) and jury voting (40%). The jury consisted of Christos Dantis (jury chairman), Johnny Kalimeris (ERT executive), Dimitris Gontikas (General Manager of ERT Television), Antonis Andrikakis (lyricist and General Manager of ERT Radio) and Mimis Plessas (composer and conductor). Public voting was conducted through telephone or SMS. "Secret Combination" came first in the public vote and second in the jury vote. In addition to the performances of the competing entries, the interval acts featured guest performances by Elnur Hüseynov and Samir Javadzadeh (who would represent Azerbaijan in 2008), Evdokia Kadi (who would represent Cyprus in 2008), Nico and Vlad Miriţă (who would represent Romania in 2008), and Rebeka Dremelj (who would represent Slovenia in 2008). Sarbel (who represented Greece in 2007) was also present at the show, performing "Yassou Maria" and "Eho trelathi".

Final – 27 February 2008
R/O	Artist	Song	Songwriter(s)	Percentage	Place
1	Chrispa	"A Chance to Love"	Marios Psimopoulos, Antonis Pappas	15.9%	3
2	Kostas Martakis	"Always and Forever"	Dimitris Kontopoulos, Vicky Gerothodorou	33.8%	2
3	Kalomira	"Secret Combination"	Konstantinos Pantzis, Poseidonas Giannopoulos	50.3%	1

=== Promotion ===
To promote "Secret Combination", a music video was created and released on 14 March 2008. It was shown exclusively on NET, but was available internationally through ERT World. It was directed by Kostas Kapetanidis, who had also directed the video of Helena Paparizou's 2005 winning entry.

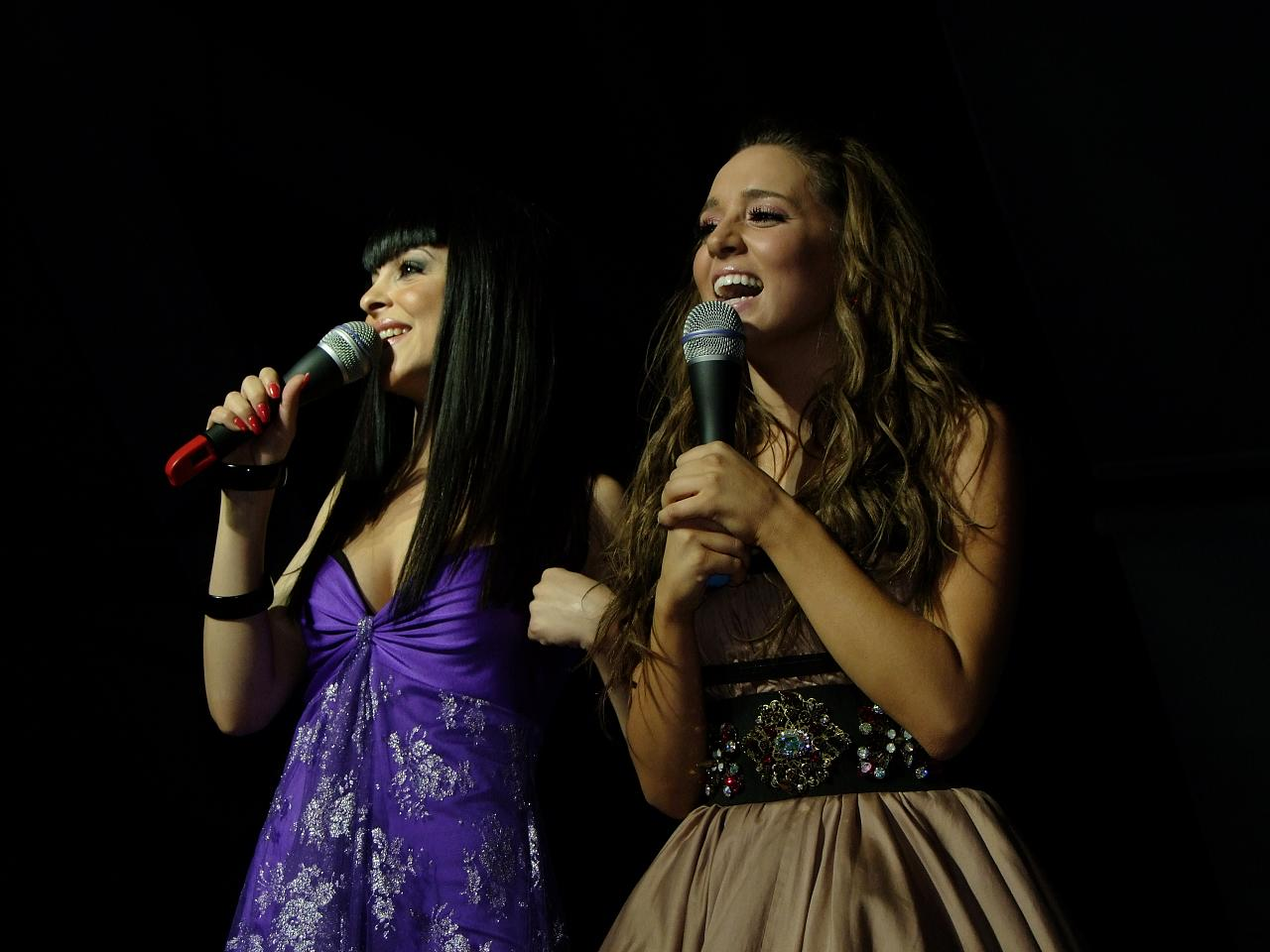
Kalomira and Cyprus' Evdokia Kadi at a Eurovision Party on 16 May 2008.

Before her appearance at the contest, Kalomira went on a promotional tour, singing "Secret Combination" in several Eurovision countries. The first stop was Azerbaijan on 22 March 2008, where she made guest appearances on many major television and radio programs; staying until March 26. On March 27, Kalomira arrived in Romania for a three-day stay, where she again appeared on television and gave interviews. After a brief break, she traveled to Turkey, arriving on April 10, where she posed for pictures, gave interviews to the local media, and went shopping through the Grand Bazaar along with Turkish media. She also met with Patriarch Bartholomew I of Constantinople, who wished her success and presented her with a medallion. By April 17, Kalomira had reached Bosnia and Herzegovina; in addition to hosting a show on PINK TV, she appeared on television shows, gave many interviews, and met with Elvir Laković Laka and his sister Mirella, Bosnia and Herzegovina's entrants in the contest. Kalomira then went to Belgrade, Serbia, where she was a guest star on a morning television show, performed "Secret Combination" live on Radio Television of Serbia, and had an interview with FOX TV. She spent one day in Belgrade and returned to Greece to conclude her tour.

== At Eurovision ==
The Eurovision Song Contest 2008 took place at the Belgrade Arena in Belgrade, Serbia. It consisted of two semi-finals held on 20 and 22 May, respectively, and the grand final on 24 May 2008. Although Greece had been granted a spot in the 2008 final because of its seventh-place finish at the Eurovision Song Contest 2007, it had to compete in a semi-final for the first time since 2004 because of new rules put into effect by the European Broadcasting Union (EBU). In previous years, countries that received a top 10 placing were automatically granted a spot in the next year's final without having to compete in a semi-final, but for 2008, the EBU changed the automatic qualification regulations so that all countries except the "Big 4" (France, Germany, Spain, and the United Kingdom) and host country, would have to pass through one of two semi-finals. The EBU split up countries with a friendly voting history into separate semi-finals, to give a better chance for other countries to win. Greece and Cyprus had often been accused of favoring each other, with each awarding the other the maximum number of points (twelve) at the previous contest. On 28 January 2008, the EBU held a special draw which determined that Greece would be in Semi-final 1 held on 20 May 2008 in Belgrade; Cyprus was subsequently placed in the second semi-final.

ERT appointed Maggira Sisters as the commentators for both the semi-final and final, and Alexis Kostalas as its spokesperson to announce the Greek voting results.

=== Semi-final ===
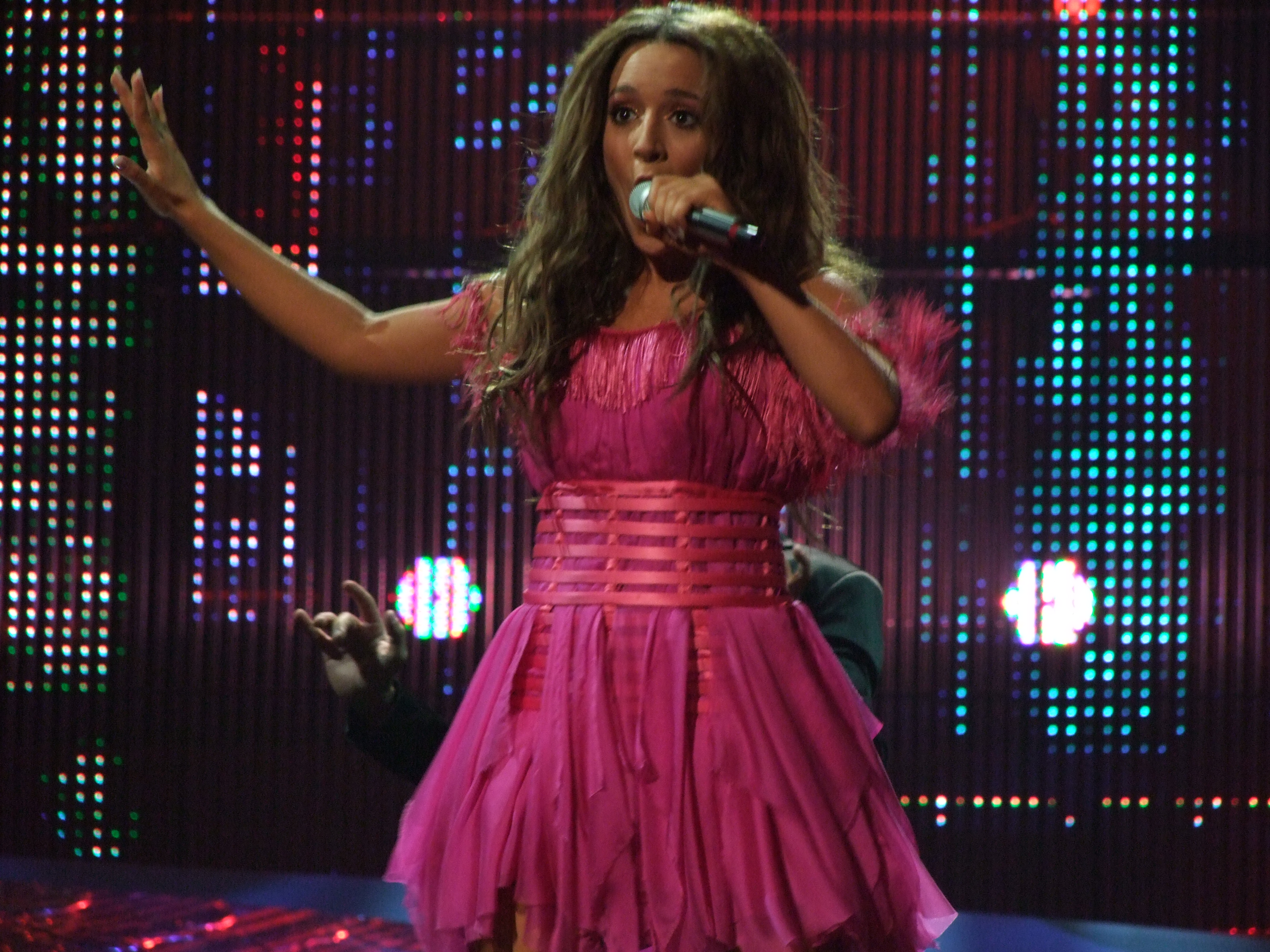
Kalomira singing at the Eurovision Semi-final

Kalomira presented "Secret Combination" nineteenth (last) in the first semi-final on 20 May 2008. In March 2008, Konstantinos Pantzis, the composer, announced that there would be a few tweaks to the song for its appearance at Eurovision. The changes included a new beat to the introduction and a few changes to the chorus. ERT announced that this new version would be presented to the EBU as the official version of the song.

The stage show included new choreography, as well as Victoria Halkiti and Nektarios Georgiadis as backing vocalists. Kalomira started off the show sitting on a diamond sequenced bench held up by her dancers. She then got down and started a dance routine with complex choreography. There was also a large purple book on stage that opened up as a heart shaped pop-up book that Kalomira stepped out of when she sang the lyrics "an open book". In time with the book opening, Kalomira removed her pink dress revealing a pink and silver mini-dress underneath. Toward the middle of the song during the break, the cameras cut to Kalomira who was doing a provocative dance; shaking her whole body. At the end of the song, she was slightly lifted up by her dancers. The background image on stage was a skyline of buildings that moved with glowing lights. She wore clothes exclusively by JLO and managed to finish in first place out of nineteen countries, receiving 156 points.

=== Final ===
Kalomira performed a repeat of her semi-final performance at the Eurovision Final on 24 May 2008. She was the twenty-first act out of twenty-five countries, after Azerbaijan and before Spain. Having led initially in the voting, Greece finished in third place behind Russia and Ukraine, receiving 218 points. Greece received 12 points, the maximum number of points a country can give to another country, from six countries. The broadcast received 93% ratings and was watched by over six million people in Greece.

=== Voting ===
Below is a breakdown of points awarded to and awarded by Greece in the first semi-final and grand final of the Eurovision Song Contest 2008.

==== Points awarded to Greece ====
Points awarded to Greece (Semi-final 1)
Score	Country
12 points	Azerbaijan; Germany; Romania; San Marino
10 points	Armenia; Belgium; Ireland
8 points	Bosnia and Herzegovina; Netherlands; Slovenia
7 points	Israel; Montenegro; Spain
6 points	Poland; Russia
5 points	Andorra; Estonia
4 points	Moldova; Norway
3 points	Finland
2 points	
1 point	

Points awarded to Greece (Final)
Score	Country
12 points	Albania; Cyprus; Germany; Romania; San Marino; United Kingdom
10 points	Bulgaria
8 points	Andorra; Armenia; Belgium; Hungary; Serbia
7 points	Bosnia and Herzegovina; Turkey
6 points	Azerbaijan; Montenegro; Netherlands; Slovenia
5 points	Croatia; Czech Republic; Israel; Switzerland
4 points	Georgia; Ireland; Moldova
3 points	Denmark; France; Macedonia; Poland; Russia; Spain
2 points	Belarus; Malta; Ukraine
1 point	Estonia; Sweden

==== Points awarded by Greece ====
Points awarded by Greece (Semi-final 1)
Score	Country
12 points	Armenia
10 points	Russia
8 points	Romania
7 points	Azerbaijan
6 points	Finland
5 points	Israel
4 points	Moldova
3 points	San Marino
2 points	Slovenia
1 point	Poland

Points awarded by Greece (Final)
Score	Country
12 points	Armenia
10 points	Albania
8 points	Spain
7 points	Russia
6 points	Ukraine
5 points	Serbia
4 points	Georgia
3 points	Azerbaijan
2 points	Norway
1 point	Israel

=== Reception ===
During a press conference in Athens after the final, Kalomira said that "it was an honor... to represent Greece in this contest" and thanked Greece because they supported her from the first moment she said she would compete. However, she reported later that she had returned to the United States because she felt mistreated by her record label and was not paid for several arrangements she had made with Heaven during her stay in Belgrade and had to pay for many things herself. In an interview with Downtown Magazine, Kalomira's father stated that she was treated "like dirt" by Heaven Music and that she may or may not continue her singing career, but that it was up to her. In response, Makis Pounetzis, the new CEO of Heaven Music, claimed that he was "surprised" by Kalomira's remarks and couldn't offer an explanation, though he did say that her contract would be honored should she choose to go back and sing again. Kalomira returned to Greece in January 2009, and in an interview with Eleni Menegaki, she said that her Eurovision participation was the biggest thing that she has done in her career, and that it was also one of the most personal events in her life that will always be remembered with good memories. When asked if she expected to do so well in the competition, she stated that she had always wanted to do well, but above all she wanted the Greek people to be proud of the performance regardless of how well it did. In the same interview, host Eleni Menegaki stated that many, including herself, viewed Eurovision as a defining point in Kalomira's career to date: her mature professional performance distanced her from the innocent little girl image associated with her participation in Fame Story.

== Notes and references ==
=== Bibliography ===
- The Eurovision Song Contest: The Official History, John Kennedy O'Connor, Carlton Books Ltd, ISBN 1-84442-994-6
