= Kalomira =

Greek-American singer (born 1985)

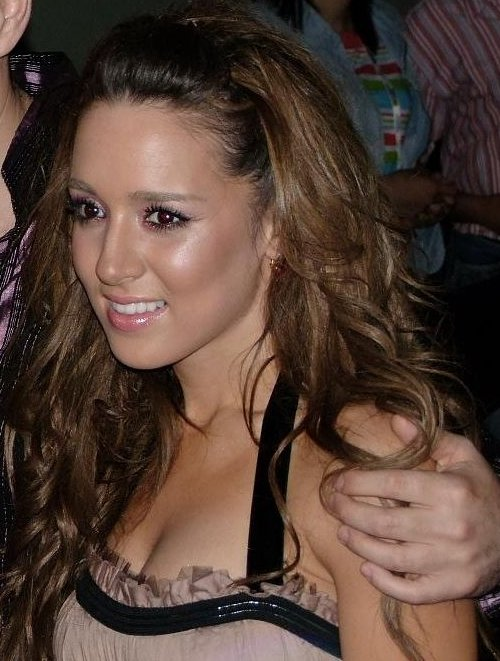
- Kalomira in Belgrade in 2008

Background information
- Also known as: Kalomoira
- Born: Maria Kalomira Carol Sarantis; January 31, 1985 (age 41); West Hempstead, New York, U.S.
- Origin: Athens, Greece
- Genres: Pop; dance; laïko
- Occupation: Singer
- Years active: 2003–present
- Labels: Heaven Music; Hot Kiss Records LLC; Panik Records
- Website: www.kalomira.com

Maria Kalomira Sarantis Boosalis (Greek: Μαρία Καλομοίρα Σαράντη Μπουσάλη; née Sarantis; born January 31, 1985), known professionally as Kalomira, is a Greek-American singer. Born and raised on Long Island, New York, she first came to prominence in Greece in 2004, after winning the Greek talent show Fame Story. She has subsequently released four studio albums, represented Greece in the Eurovision Song Contest 2008, gaining the third place and hosted various television shows.

== Early life ==
Kalomira was born Maria Kalomira Sarantis on January 31, 1985, in West Hempstead, Long Island. Known to her immediate family as Carol (her childhood nickname), her parents, Nikos and Eleni Sarantis, own a Greek restaurant. Her ancestry is from Laconia, Peloponnese (Kremasti and Niata). Since childhood, Kalomoira had the ambition to become a pop star. She played the viola, which she studied for nine years and played in the school orchestra. She was also Miss West Hempstead (Homecoming Queen) at her high school in 2003. In 2003, she entered a music contest organized by WBLI Radio and won second place. Following her appearance, she opened up several live shows with famous American artists, such as Jessica Simpson, LL Cool J, Jennifer Love Hewitt, Michelle Branch and Nick Lachey.

== Career ==
=== 2003–2004: Fame Story, Kalomira, and Lampsi ===
Kalomira entered the New York City auditions for Antenna's reality singing competition Fame Story 2, which was a licensed variant of the Star Academy franchise. She was one of two selected from over 200 auditions in New York. Despite speaking primarily English, and not speaking Greek fluently, Kalomira went to Greece after having completed one semester of college at Adelphi University where she was a music major with a scholarship. Kalomira gained the first place and her professional singing career began. Kalomira won the contest with a prize of 200,000 Euros and a recording contract with Heaven Music. The audience of the show loved her from the beginning and they created the slogan, "Irthes kai mas allakses ti moira, Kalomoira-Kalomoira" (“You came and changed our destiny, Kalomira-Kalomira”). This was because her name means good fortune in Greek.

Kalomira performed in Thessaloniki’s FOCUS from July 8 to August 14. While entertaining audiences by night, she was recording her first album by day. Outside of Greece, Kalomira has appeared on NBC’s "Today Show" and "Access Hollywood" during the events of the 2004 Summer Olympics in Athens, UPN's Greek Parade where she sang live and was interviewed, Fox News, was in the "Washington Post", "Newsday" and "New York Times" and most currently featured on Oprah for her Eurovision Performance, along with a number of other shows and websites. On September 1, 2004, Kalomira released her 15-track debut album Kalomira, which became gold in Greece and Cyprus. Her lead single, "Nomizeis", became an instant hit, topping the charts in Greece. The next singles from the album were the songs, "Ego eimai i Kalomira", "Pethaino Gia Sena", "Proti Mou Fora" and the Christmas song, "Kai Tou Hronou". She then toured Greece accompanied by the rest of the "Fame Story" participants with appearances in Athens's "Thalassa". In the same year, she closed her season at the REX studio with Despina Vandi and Thanos Petrelis. Kalomira received good reviews from the critics and was awarded the, "Woman of the Year – Best Newcomer Award”, by Life and Style magazine. Also in 2004, she had a minor credited role in the longest-running Greek TV drama series Lampsi, playing the part of Jennifer Drakou for 30 episodes, where veteran director Nikos Foskolos compared her to Greece’s most famous actress, Aliki Vougiouklaki. Kalomira performed twice in the Herodium theatre, emerging out of a cake as a surprise for the musician’s Dionysis Savvopoulos's birthday singing Marilyn Monroe's song, "Happy Birthday Mr. President".

=== 2005–2006: Paizeis?, I Kalomira Paei Cinema, and Pio Poly Tin Kiriaki ===
In 2005, Kalomira released her second album titled Paizeis? (You Playing?) with 12 songs, of which two were written and composed by her. "Paizeis" and "Ki Olo Perimeno" were the two singles from the album that stood out with great success. She also agreed to appear with Elli Kokkinou, Andreas Stamos and Constantinos Christoforou at the Piraeus 130 music club. In her program, she included covers of songs such as "Scandalous," "Don't Cha" and "Don't Phunk with My Heart," in addition to songs from her first and second albums. On April 11 2005, she was a special guest on the first live concert of the first season of Star Academy Bulgaria. For three months she had the role of co-hostess next to Eleonora Meleti on the show Proinos Cafes (Morning Coffee).

In the fall of 2006, Kalomira became the female co-hostess on the hit Sunday night show Pio Poli Tin Kiriaki (Even More on Sunday) alongside Grigoris Arnaoutoglou on Mega Channel. In December, she released her third studio album I Kalomira Paei Cinema (Kalomira Goes to the Cinema). It's a concept album with the most popular classic songs from the old Greek Cinema. At that time they appeared with Nikos Makropoulos, Aggeliki Iliadi and Sarbel at the Fever nightclub.

=== 2007–2009: Eurovision Song Contest, Secret Combination: The Album, and Big in Japan ===
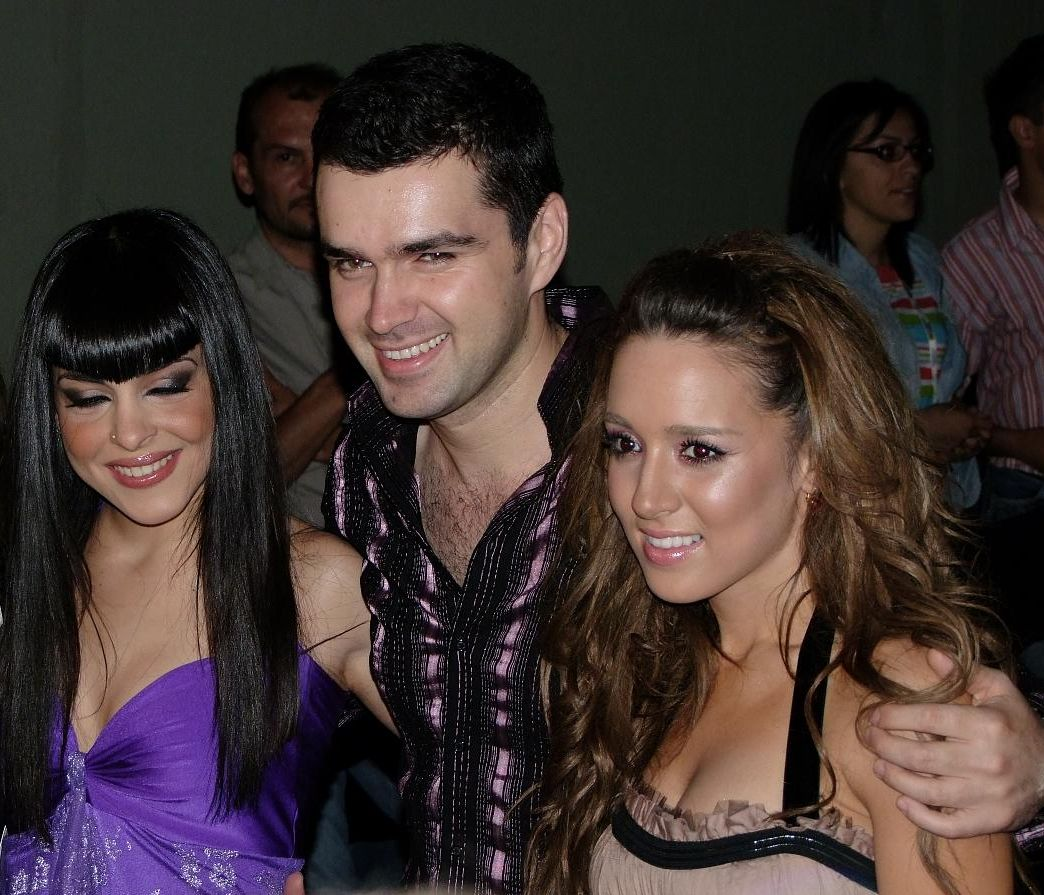
Evdokia Kadi, Vlad Miriţă and Kalomira at a Eurovision party in Belgrade, May 16, 2008

At the end of 2007, Heaven Music chose Kalomira to be their contestant in the 2008 National Final to represent Greece in the Eurovision Song Contest 2008. Kalomira picked an R&B style upbeat song with a Greek feel composed by Konstantinos Pantzis with lyrics by Poseidonas Giannopoulos titled "Secret Combination". The song has an "American production" feel to it. On February 27, 2008, Kalomira won the National Final with "Secret Combination" and represented Greece in the Eurovision Song Contest 2008. To promote the song, Kalomira had a pre-Eurovision tour and visited several Eurovision countries throughout March and April.

In the first semi- final, held on May 20, 2008, Kalomira, was the first to pass through to the finals. At the Eurovision final, on May 24, she reached the impressive third place, behind Russia and Ukraine, with 218 points. In an interview with Eleni Menegaki, she said that above all she wanted the Greek people to be proud of the performance.

Kalomira announced on her online diary that she recorded her new album during September and October 2007 in Greece. The album, named Secret Combination: The Album, was released on May 29, 2008, and contained songs in both Greek and English, including her Eurovision entry "Secret Combination". There is also a bonus rap remix of "Secret Combination" by Master Tempo. The writers are Konstantinos Pantzis, Tasos Vougiatzis and Sunny X. Kalomira did not participate in the promotion of the album, due to a dispute with Heaven Music. She focused on presenting TV shows, including the Greek version of the game show Big in Japan which took place in Japan and featured 12 contestants. For this tv show, Kalomira won two awards at the European Festival, the Best Show 2009 and the Best Reality Show 2009.

=== 2010–2014: International collaborations, a brief pause and concert tours ===
In January 2010, it was announced that Kalomira would be featured in a series of advertisements as the main spokesperson promoting Domino's Pizza in Greece. In March 2010, Kalomira renewed her contract with Heaven Music. For her next single she collaborated with big producers in the world music industry. The single was called "Please Don't Break My Heart", which featured American rapper, Fatman Scoop and was produced by Toni Cottura. The video was filmed in Turkey and the song premiered on Rythmos 94.9.

In June 2011, Kalomira released her next single, which was called, "This Is The Time'". A music video premiered in July. In the summer of 2011 she toured Greece and Cyprus and then returned to America performing live concerts for Greeks abroad. On December 31, Kalomira did a concert for the charity cause, "Bring in 2012 with Kalomira!", for the Greek Orthodox community in Washington DC. On February 22, 2012, her new single, “Other Side Tonight” was released by "Hot Kiss Records LLC", which is the company she and her husband own. The song was written by GMoney and Jeremy Beaber. On 2 March, Kalomira presented together with Australia's comedian actor Angelo Tsarouchas, the Greek Beauty Pageant - Kalistia 2012 in Canada. After that she stopped working for two years, due to the pregnancy of her twins.

In March 2014, Kalomira came back to Greece after two and a half years from her last appearance. She gave many interviews on television and in magazines. She sang as a guest star the new version of "Secret Combination", with Claydee Lupa at Greece's National Final for the Eurovision Song Contest 2014.

She toured performing concerts in the USA. The first stop was on June 3 2014, in a football game for Greece and Nigeria in Philadelphia, where she sang the Greek national anthem and many songs. On June 6, she performed for the first time in Baltimore in the concert, "St. Nicholas Greek Folk Festival 2014 featuring: Kalomira!". On July 23, she performed in New York City in the concert, "The Loukoumi make a difference foundation". She performed with Anna Vissi, Gloria Gaynor, Constantine Maroulis and Olympia Dukakis.

In a 2014 interview, Kalomira said that she started her music career when she was eighteen and half years old. She has expressed herself through her music over a span of more than 10 years. Her music describes what she has gone through in her life.

=== 2015–2021: Rising Star, various digital singles and second pause ===
In the summer of 2015, Kalomira made an appearance on MAD VMA 2015 performing a new summer song titled, "This Is Summer" released by Panik Records. Also, she gave some TV interviews and left for USA until the last month of 2016. That was a second pause from Kalomira because she gave birth to her third child.

In December 2016, Kalomira returned to Greece and recorded a Greek-language Christmas single titled, "Ta Christougenna Afta", which was accompanied by an English version titled, "Christmas Time" and released by Heaven Music. Kalomira participated as a hostess at the backstage of the new music talent show, Rising Star. Her next singles were, "Shoot 'em Down" and "Lipstick 2017". The former was written by the producers of, "Secret Combination".

From 2018 to 2020, Kalomira released the singles, "Mommy Loves You" dedicated to her children, "Gia Mia Zoi" in Greek and "You're Not Alone" in English, which she wrote during the coronavirus pandemic. In 2019, she appeared in the fashion show MadWalk performing Ariana Grande's song, "No Tears Left To Cry".

=== 2022–present: Return to Greece, J2US, and I'm a Celebrity... Get Me Out of Here! ===
In December 2022, she returned to Greece with a new hairstyle with blonde hair. She performed Marilyn Monroe's song "Diamonds Are a Girl's Best Friend" at the fashion music show, MadWalk.

In June 2023, she replaced the singer Biased Beast and became a coach for the actress Louisa Pyriochou on the show Just the Two of Us. They gained second place in the grand final of the show. She also released a new single, after three years, which was called, "Stohos" (Goal) and toured Greece throughout the summer. She performed the Eurovision Song Contest 2023 song, "Cha Cha Cha" and David Guetta's song, "I'm Good" with Stefania and the girl group 3SUM at the Mad Video Music Awards.

In September 2023, it was officially announced that she will present the show, I'm a Celebrity... Get Me Out of Here! together with George Lianos.

== Personal life ==
In 2010, she married real estate developer George Boosalis on September 26 at the Greek Orthodox Cathedral of Saint Paul in Hempstead, New York. In December 2012 Kalomira gave birth to two twin boys. Four years later, in July 2016, she gave birth to a girl.

== Discography ==
All the albums listed underneath were released and charted in Greece and Cyprus.

=== Studio albums ===
Title	Album details	Peak chart positions	
Title	Album details	GR	CY
Kalomira	Released: September 1, 2004; Label: Heaven Music; Format: CD, digital download; Certified: Gold	1	1
Paizeis?	Released: November 29, 2005; Label: Heaven Music; Format: CD, digital download	10	2
I Kalomira Paei Cinema	Released: December 7, 2006; Label: Heaven Music; Format: CD, digital download	9	9
Secret Combination: The Album	Released: May 29, 2008; Label: Heaven Music; Format: CD, digital download	13	10

=== Compilation album ===
Title	Album details	Peak chart positions	
Title	Album details	GR	CY
Best Of	Released: December 2016; Label: Heaven Music; Format: Digital download	—	—

=== Soundtrack album ===
Title	Album details	Peak chart positions	
Title	Album details	GR	CY
Voutia Sti Vithoupoli	Released: November 2, 2019; Label: Minos EMI; Format: CD, Digital download	—	—

=== Singles as lead artist ===
Title	Year	Peak chart positions			Album
Title	Year	GRE	CYP	Other charts	Album
"Nomizeis"	2004	1	1	—	Kalomira
"Ego Eimai I Kalomira"	2004	3	1	—	Kalomira
"Proti Mou Fora"	2004	17	12	—	Kalomira
"Kai Tou Chronou"	2005	15	18	—	Kalomira Special Gold Edition
"Pethaino Gia Sena"	2005	11	16	—	Kalomira
"Paizeis"	2005	3	9	—	Paizeis?
"Ki Olo Perimeno"	2006	6	11	—	Paizeis?
"Secret Combination"	2008	1	1	TUR: 18; DEN: 29; SWE: 38; IR: 46; EU: 67; UK: 71; CAN: 331	Secret Combination: The Album
"Sto Diko Mou Rythmo"	2008	18	32	SP: 4	Secret Combination: The Album
"Hot"	2009	—	—	—	Secret Combination: The Album
"Please Don't Break My Heart" (Kalomira feat. Fatman Scoop)	2010	6	5	—	Best Of
"This Is The Time"	2011	25	38	—	Non-album singles
"Other Side Tonight"	2012	—	—	—	Non-album singles
"This Is Summer"	2015	—	—	—	Non-album singles
"Ta Christougenna Afta" / "Christmas Time"	2016	65	—	—	Best Of
"Shoot 'em Down"	2017	—	—	—	Non-album singles
"Mommy Loves You"	2018	—	—	—	Non-album singles
"Gia Mia Zoi" / "You're Not Alone"	2020	—	—	—	Non-album singles
"Stohos"	2023	—	—	—	Non-album singles
"Rolling"	2024	—	—	—	Non-album singles
"Amen"	2024	—	—	—	Non-album singles
"Papi" (Kalomira feat. Ripen)	2024	—	—	—	Non-album singles
"Magika Hristougenna"	2024	—	—	—	Non-album singles
"Ola Gia Sena"	2026	—	—	—	Non-album singles

=== Singles as featured artist ===
Title	Year	Peak chart positions		Album
Title	Year	GRE	CYP	Album
"Lipstick 2017" (Kim Diamantopoulos feat. Kalomira)	2017	—	—	Non-album single

=== Promotional singles ===
Title	Year	Peak chart positions		Album
Title	Year	GRE	CYP	Album
"Gine Mazi Mou Paidi"	2006	17	—	CD single: Gine Mazi Mou Paidi
"Riko, Riko, Rikoko (T' Agori Mou)"	2007	—	—	I Kalomira Paei Cinema
"Thelo Ta Opa Mou"	2007	—	—	I Kalomira Paei Cinema
"Afto To Mambo To Brazilero"	2007	—	—	I Kalomira Paei Cinema
"Crazy Girl"	2007	—	—	I Kalomira Paei Cinema
"Tou Agoriou Apenanti"	2007	—	—	I Kalomira Paei Cinema
"Aliki Tsa - Tsa - Tsa"	2007	—	—	I Kalomira Paei Cinema
"I Do"	2010	72	—	CD single: I Do
"Secret Combination (Pride version)" (Kalomira feat. Katerina Stikoudi & Mark F. Angelo)	2024	—	—	Non-album singles
"Happy Birthday to You"	2024	—	—	Non-album singles

=== Other charted and certified songs ===
Title	Year	Peak chart positions		Album
Title	Year	GRE	CYP	Album
"Kathe Skepsi Mou... Esy"	2004	18	—	Kalomira
"Den Endiaferomai"	2004	—	—	Kalomira
"Alitaki"	2004	—	—	Kalomira
"Po Po Po"	2004	—	—	Kalomira
"Tora"	2005	—	—	Paizeis?
"Mystiko"	2005	—	—	Paizeis?
"S' Agapo"	2008	—	—	Secret Combination: The Album
"Iparhoun Ores"	2008	—	—	Secret Combination: The Album
"Secret Combination (Master Tempo Mix)" (with Master Tempo)	2008	—	—	Secret Combination: The Album
"Please Don't Break My Heart (Ragga Version)"	2010	13	9	Non-album single
"Bes Sti Giorti" (with Andriana Babali, Idra Kayne, Markos Koumaris, George Lembesis, Panos Mouzourakis, Panagiotis Rallis, Sakis Rouvas, Tamta, Charis Varthakouris)	2019	—	—	Voutia Sti Vithoupoli
"Pano Sta Kimata"	2019	—	—	Voutia Sti Vithoupoli

=== Video album ===
Title	DVD details
Kalomira Special Karaoke Edition	Released: September 2005; Label: Heaven Music; Format: DVD

== Filmography ==
=== Television ===
Title	Year	Role	Notes
Fame Story	2004	Herself / Contestant	Season 2 of the Greek Star Academy Winner
Lampsi	2004	Jennifer Drakou / Guest star	Season 14 30 episodes
Proinos Cafes	2005	Herself / Co-Hostess	
Pio Poly Tin Kyriaki	2006–2007	Herself / Co-Hostess	Season 2 of the Greek entertainment show
Ellinikos Telikos 2008	2008	Herself / Contestant	The Greek national final for the Eurovision Song Contest 2008 Winner
Eurovision Song Contest	2008	Herself / Contestant	1st place in the first semi final 3rd place in the final
Big in Japan	2009	Herself / Hostess	The Greek version of the I Survived a Japanese Game Show
Ellinikos Telikos 2009	2009	Herself / Performer	The Greek national final for the Eurovision Song Contest 2009 Interval act
Eurosong 2014	2014	Herself / Performer	The Greek national final for the Eurovision Song Contest 2013 Opening act
Rising Star	2016–2017	Herself / Backstage Hostess	Season 1 of the Greek version of the Rising Star
J2US	2023	Herself / Coach & Contestant	Season 7 of the Greek version of the Just the Two of Us 2nd place
I'm a Celebrity... Get Me Out of Here!	2023	Herself / Hostess	Season 1 of the Greek version of the I'm a Celebrity...Get Me Out of Here!

=== Web ===
Title	Year	Role	Notes
Get The Job	2010	Herself / Hostess	The first online reality show in Greece

=== Commercials ===
Commercial	Year	Role
Everest	2004–2007	Herself
JLo shop	2008–2010	Herself
GetItNow	2009–2010	Herself
Domino's Pizza	2010	Herself
Nature's Bounty	2017	Herself

=== Theater ===
Title	Year	Role	Notes
40 Hronia Dionysis Savvopoulos	2004	Herself	Herodium Theatre

=== Music videos ===
Title	Year	Director(s)
"Nomizeis"	2004	Kostas Kapetanidis
"Proti Mou Fora"΄	2004	Manolis Tzirakis
"Pethaino Gia Sena"	2005	Kostas Kapetanidis
"Paizeis"	2005	Kostas Kapetanidis
"Gine Mazi Mou Paidi"	2006	Kostas Kapetanidis
"Ki Olo Perimeno"	2006	Kostas Kapetanidis
"Medley"	2007	Maria Stoka
"Secret Combination"	2008	Kostas Kapetanidis
"Please Don't Break My Heart" (featuring Fatman Scoop)	2010	Murat Onbul
"This Is The Time"	2011	Kostas Kapetanidis
"Ta Christougenna Afta"	2016	Vangelis Tsaousopoulos
"Shoot 'em Down"	2017	Thanos Gomozias
"Lipstick 2017" (with Kim Diamantopoulos)	2017	Alex Kostantinidis
"Mommy Loves You"	2018	Dimitris Paleologos
"Stohos"	2023	Yiannis Papadakos
Rolling	2024	Yiannis Papadakos

=== Lyric videos ===
Title	Year	Director(s)
"This Is Summer"	2015	
"Ta Christougenna Afta"	2016	Creative Market Services
"Christmas Time"	2016	Creative Market Services
"Shoot 'em Down"	2017	Creative International
"Gia Mia Zoi"	2020	Kalomira
"You're Not Alone"	2020	Kalomira

== Tours and residencies ==
=== Concert tours ===
Headlining

- Summer Concerts (2006)
- Greek Concerts (2007)
- Secret Combination: The Eurovision Promo Tour (2008)
- Kalomira 2008 US Summer Tour (2008)
- North America Club Tour (2009)
- Greek & Cypriot Summer Tour (2011)
- USA Concerts (2011-2012)
- Kalomira USA Tour (2014)
- Greek Summer Concerts (2023)

Joint

- Fame Story Tour (with the contestants of Fame Story 2) (2004)
- Despina Vandi - Kalomira - Yorgos Christou Live Tour (2005)
- USA Festivals (variously concerts; some of the artists were Gloria Gaynor, Anna Vissi, Yorgos Margaritis, Glykeria, Stelios Dionisiou) (2013-2014)

=== Concert residencies ===
Secondary act

- Rex (with Despina Vandi, Thanos Petrelis, Yorgos Christou) (2004-2005)
- Palais de Sports (with Despina Vandi, Yorgos Christou) (2005)
- Pyli Axiou (with Despina Vandi, Thanos Petrelis, Yorgos Christou) (2004-2005)
- Odos Peiraios 130 (with Elli Kokkinou, Andreas Stamos, Chryspa, Constantinos Christoforou) (2005-2006)
- Fever (with Nikos Makropoulos, Angeliki Iliadi, Sarbel) (2006-2007)
- Boom (with Elli Kokkinou, Stamatis Gonidis, Yorgos Lianos) (2007)

== Awards and nominations ==
Kalomira awards and nominations
Awards and nominations
Award	Wins	Nominations
European Festival	2	2
Life & Style - Women Of The Year	1	2
The Elios Spotlight Awards	1	1
Eurovision Awards	1	1
MAD Video Music Awards	0	2
Eurovision Radio Awards	0	2
OneWoman	0	2
Lalore02 Awards	1	3

Totals (Note: Certain award groups do not simply award one winner. They acknowledge several different recipients, have runners-up, and have third place. Since this is a specific recognition and is different from losing an award, runner-up mentions are considered wins in this award tally. For simplification and to avoid errors, each award in this list has been presumed to have had a prior nomination.)
- Wins: 6
- Nominations: 15

Year	Award	Category	Recipient	Result
2005	Life & Style - Women Of The Year	Best New Artist	Herself	Won
2005	MAD Video Music Awards	Best New Artist	"Nomizeis"	Nominated
2008	Eurovision Radio Awards	Best Song	"Secret Combination"	Nominated
2008	Eurovision Radio Awards	Best Female Artist	"Secret Combination"	Nominated
2009	Eurovision Awards	Best Performance	"Secret Combination"	Won
2009	Life & Style - Women Of The Year	Best Female Artist	Herself	Nominated
2009	The Elios Spotlight Awards	Best Performing Artist	Herself	Won
2009	European Festival	Best Reality Show	"Big In Japan"	Won
2009	European Festival	Best Show	"Big In Japan"	Won
2011	One Woman	Hottest Woman	Herself	Nominated
2012	One Woman	Hottest Woman	Herself	Nominated
2012	LaLore02 Awards	Best Song	"Po Po Po"	Won
2013	MAD Video Music Awards	Best Live Act - 10 Years MAD VMA	"Please Don't Break My Heart"	Nominated
2013	LaLore02 Awards	Best Song	"Me Ponas"	Nominated
2015	LaLore02 Awards	Best Song	"This Is Summer"	Nominated

Awards and achievements
Preceded by Notis Christodoulou	Fame Story; Winner; 2004	Succeeded by Pericles Stergianoudes
Preceded by Sarbel with Yassou Maria	Greece in the Eurovision Song Contest; 2008	Succeeded by Sakis Rouvas with This Is Our Night
