= Verka Serduchka discography =

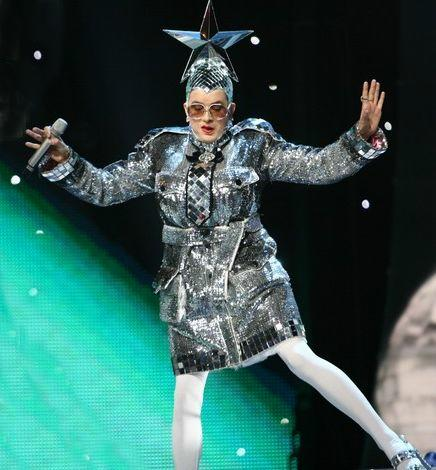
- Studio albums: 4
- EPs: 2
- Soundtrack albums: 7
- Compilation albums: 5

Ukrainian singer Verka Serduchka (Andriy Danylko) has released four studio albums, seven soundtrack albums, five compilation albums, and two extended plays.

== Albums ==
=== Studio albums ===
Title	Album details	Certifications
Kha-ra-sho!	Released: 2003; Label: Mamamusic; Format: CD, cassette, digital download	IFPI Ukraine: Diamond
Chita Drita	Released: 2003; Label: Mamamusic, Gramophone Records; Format: CD, cassette, digital download	
Tralli-Valli	Released: 2006; Label: Mamamusic, Soyuz, Teatr Danilko; Format: CD, cassette, digital download	
Doremi Doredo	Released: 8 July 2008; Label: Mamamusic, Kvadro-Disk, Teatr Danilko; Format: CD, digital download	

=== EPs ===
Title	Album details
Ya rozhdena dlya lyubvi	Released: 30 March 1998; Label: Nova Records; Format: Cassette
Sexy	Released: 4 September 2020; Label: Mamamusic; Format: Digital download

=== Compilation albums ===
Title	Album details	Peak chart positions
Title	Album details	FRA
Neizdannoye	Released: 2002; Label: NAC, Mamamusic; Format: CD, cassette	—
Zhenikha khotela. Neizdannoye	Released: 2004; Label: Mamamusic, Studiya "Monolit"; Format: CD, cassette	—
Dancing Europe	Released: 2007; Label: Universal Licensing Music; Format: CD	105
The Best	Released: 2008; Label: Mamamusic, Kvadro-Disk, Teatr Danilko; Format: CD	—
Vsyo budet khorosho (The Best of Verka Serduchka)	Released: 5 May 2017; Label: Mamamusic; Format: Digital download	—

=== Soundtrack albums ===
Title	Album details
Vechera na khutore bliz Dikanki	Released: 2001; Label: Volia Music; Format: CD, cassette
Pesni iz filma Zolushka	Released: 2002; Label: Silver Records, JRC; Format: cassette, CD
Novogodnyaya muzykalnaya skazka "Snezhnaya Koroleva"	Released: 2003; Label: АРС Records; Format: CD, cassette
Pesni iz filma "Bezumny den, ili Zhenidba Figaro"	Released: 25 December 2003; Label: Kvadro-Disk, JRC; Format: CD, cassette
Za dvumya zaytsami	Released: 2004; Label: Mamamusic; Format: CD, cassette
Pesni iz filma "Sorochinskaya Yarmarka"	Released: 2004; Label: Mamamusic; Format: CD, cassette
Spy (Original Motion Picture Soundtrack)	Released: 25 May 2015; Label: Milan; Format: CD, digital download

=== Instrumental albums ===
Title	Album details
Posle tebya... (as Andrey Danilko)	Released: 2005; Label: Mamamusic; Format: CD, cassette

== Singles ==
=== As lead artist ===
List of singles as lead artist, with selected chart positions and album name
Title	Year	Peak chart positions											Album
Title	Year	UKR	AUT	CIS	FIN	FRA	GER	IRE	RUS	SWE	SWI	UK	Album
"Novogodnyaya"	2003	2	—	1	—	—	—	—	5	—	—	—	Chita Drita
"Sumasshedshaya semeyka" (featuring Alla Pugacheva)	2004	4	—	11	—	—	—	—	—	—	—	—	Za dvumya zaytsami
"Zhenikha khotela" (featuring Glukoza)	2004	1	—	1	—	—	—	—	47	—	—	—	Zhenikha khotela. Neizdannoye
"Tuk, tuk, tuk"	2004	—	—	92	—	—	—	—	20	—	—	—	Chita Drita
"Yolki"	2004	96	—	9	—	—	—	—	28	—	—	—	Chita Drita
"Ya popala na lyubov"	2005	27	—	62	—	—	—	—	—	—	—	—	Chita Drita
"Ne kupish lyubov" (with Valery Meladze, Sofia Rotaru and Nu Virgos)	2005	33	—	24	—	—	—	—	—	—	—	—	Pesni iz filma "Sorochinskaya Yarmarka"
"Sama sebe"	2005	57	—	99	—	—	—	—	89	—	—	—	Tralli-Valli
"Tralli-Valli"	2005	12	—	17	—	—	—	—	30	—	—	—	Tralli-Valli
"Khorosho krasavitsam"	2006	4	—	23	—	—	—	—	47	—	—	—	Tralli-Valli
"A ya smeyus"	2006	—	—	95	—	—	—	—	67	—	—	—	Tralli-Valli
"Beri vsyo"	2006	3	—	69	—	—	—	—	—	—	—	—	Tralli-Valli
"Dancing Lasha Tumbai"	2007	30	49	110	2	6	74	31	—	6	53	28	Doremi Doredo
"Kiss, please"	2008	72	—	119	—	—	—	—	—	—	—	—	Doremi Doredo
"Doremi"	2008	1	—	76	—	—	—	—	—	—	—	—	Doremi Doredo
"Evro Vision Queen"	2008	—	—	237	—	—	—	—	—	—	—	—	Doremi Doredo
"Leti na svet" (featuring EL Kravchuk)	2008	53	—	49	—	—	—	—	—	—	—	—	Na oblakah
"Dolche Gabbana"	2010	2	—	12	—	—	—	—	16	—	—	—	Non-album singles
"Smaylik"	2011	4	—	14	—	—	—	—	15	—	—	—	Non-album singles
"#switter"	2012	11	—	14	—	—	—	—	31	—	—	—	Non-album singles
"Gidropark"	2014	38	—	159	—	—	—	—	—	—	—	—	Non-album singles
"Make It Rain Champagne"	2019	7	—	98	—	—	—	—	—	—	—	—	Sexy
"Swedish Lullaby"	2020	56	—	—	—	—	—	—	—	—	—	—	Sexy
"Wild Christmas"	2021	73	—	—	—	—	—	—	—	—	—	—	Non-album singles
"Je propozytsiya"	2022	—	—	—	—	—	—	—	—	—	—	—	Non-album singles
"—" denotes a recording that did not chart or was not released in that country.

=== As featured artist ===
List of singles as featured artist, with selected chart positions, showing year released
Title	Year	Peak chart positions
Title	Year	UKR
"#Moskal_nekrasivyi" (Jerry Heil feat. Verka Serduchka)	2022	15

== Music videos ==
As Verka Serduchka
Title	Year	Director	Ref.
"Po chut-cut"	1998	Vyacheslav Feofilaktov	
"Kontolyor"	1999	Unknown	
"Pirozhok"	2001	Vladimir Yakimenko	
"Hop-hop"	2001	Maxim Papernik	
"Vera plus Misha" (with Mikhaylo Poplasky)	2001	Unknown	
"Vsyo budet khorosho"	2003	Maxim Papernik	
"Chita-drita"	2003	Semyon Gorov	
"Tuk, tuk, tuk"	2004	Semyon Gorov	
"Ya popala na lyubov"	2005	Semyon Gorov	
"Hop Hop Hop" (with Renia Paczkowska)	2005	Semyon Gorov	
"Tralli-Valli"	2005	Alexandr Filatovich	
"Khorosho krasavitsam"	2005	Alexandr Filatovich	
"Beri vsyo"	2006	Alexandr Igudin	
"A ya smeyus"	2006	Semyon Gorov	
"Dancing Lasha Tumbai"	2007	Semyon Gorov	
"Кiss Please"	2007	Alan Badoev	
"Doremi"	2008	Alan Badoev	
"Evro Vision Queen"	2008	Pavel Novikov & Semyon Gorov	
"Essen (Tim-Tim Taram)"	2008	Viktor Skuratovsky	
"Je propozytsiya"	2022	Oleh Zborovskii	

As Andrey Danilko
Title	Year	Director	Ref.
"Kukla"	2005	Alan Badoev	
"Posle tebya"	2006	Alan Badoev	
"Blago daryu" (with Olga Gorbachyova)	2013	Vyacheslav Melnik	
