= Dancing Europe =

Compilation album by Verka Serduchka

Compilation album by Verka Serduchka
- Released: August 2007
- Genre: Europop
- Length: 41:22
- Language: Russian; English; Deutsch; Ukrainian
- Label: Mamamusic; Universal Music
- Producer: Andriy Danylko; Yurii Nikitin (exec)

Verka Serduchka chronology
Tralli-Valli (2006)	Dancing Europe (2007)	Doremi Doredo (2008)

Singles from Dancing Europe
- 1. "Dancing Lasha Tumbai" Released: 2007; 2. "Hop Hop" Released: 2007

Dancing Europe is the compilation album by Ukrainian singer Verka Serduchka released in 2007 by Mamamusic and Universal Music.

== Overview ==
In 2007 Verka Serduchka represented Ukraine at the Eurovision Song Contest in Helsinki with the song "Dancing Lasha Tumbai". The song took second place in the final, and on the wave of success Andriy Danylko decides to release this compilation in Europe. In that summer, Danylko signed two contracts with the French division of Universal and the German Warner. To promote the album in France, Verka Serduchka appeared on popular TV channels TF1 and M6.

The album contains both old and new songs. Songs "Vse Bydet Horosho" and "Hop Hop" were taken from debut studio album Kha-ra-sho! (2003) and "Horosho Krasavitsam" and "A Ya Smeyus" were taken from the third studio album Tralli-Valli (2006). Other songs was written by Danylko in English and Deutsch. According to Danylko, the producers themselves chose songs from the old repertoire of Serdyuchka.

In August 2008, the album entered the French albums chart and reached the 105th position.

== Track listing ==
No.	Title	Writer(s)	Length
1.	"Dancing" (Original Version)	Andriy Danylko	3:11
2.	"Essen" (Tim-Tim Taram)	Danylko	2:36
3.	"Vse Bydet Horosho" (Everything Will Be Good)	Danylko	3:49
4.	"Hop Hop"	Danylko	3:09
5.	"Horosho Krasavitsam" (Good To Be Pretty)	Lyubasha	3:22
6.	"Gorbachev" (Stravropols's Tango)	Danylko	4:30
7.	"A Ya Smeyus" (I Am Smiling)	Lyubasha	3:13
8.	"Grosse Liebe"	Danylko	3:11
9.	"Dancing" (Pub Version Art)	Danylko	3:12
10.	"Poppi" (Crazy Ringtone)	Danylko	3:06
11.	"Beri Vse" (Take Everything)	Lyubasha	3:20
12.	"Evro Visión Queen"	Danylko	4:24
Total length:			41:22

== Charts ==
Chart (2007)	Peak position
French Albums (SNEP)	105
