= Solntse (album) =

Solntse Солнце

Studio album by Ani Lorak
- Released: May 2009
- Recorded: VOX Recording Studios - Athens, Greece, 2008–2009
- Genres: Pop, rock, dance-pop
- Length: 45:06
- Languages: Russian, English
- Label: Moon Records
- Producer: Dimitris Kontopoulos

Ani Lorak chronology
15 (2007)	Solntse; Солнце (2009)

Singles from Solntse
- 1. "Solntse" Released: December 2008; 2. "A dal'she..." Released: 2009; 3. "Nebesa-ladony" Released: 2010

Solntse (Russian: Солнце; English: The Sun) is Ukrainian singer Ani Lorak eleventh studio album. The album features Lorak's Eurovision Song Contest 2008 entry "Shady Lady" as well as its Russian counterpart "С неба в небо". The album comes as a CD/DVD pack with the DVD featuring 5 videos.

== Release ==
Recording took place at VOX Recording Studios in Athens, Greece, in 2008–2009. Composed and produced primarily by Dimitris Kontopoulos, the album's sound differs from past albums featuring a more European sounding of songs and an album built on fresh material.

The debut single from the album, titled "Solntse" was released in December 2008. It peaked at number 1 in both Ukraine and Russia respectively. The album also includes an English version of the song titled "I'm Alive".

The second single from the album "A Dal'she" (А дальше...; And more...) was released in 2009 and peaked at number 1 in Ukraine while it reached the top 10 in Russia. The music video for the song was shot in India, and features an Indian theme.

On November 28, 2009, the title track "Solntse" won the "Best Song of the Year 2009" award at the "Zolotoi Grammofon" awards held Moscow, Russia.

== Track listing ==
No.	Title	Lyrics	Music	Translation	Length
1.	"Птица" (Ptitsa)	Karen Kavaleryan	Dimitris Kontopoulos, Ani Lorak	Bird	3:08
2.	"А дальше…" (A dal'she...)	Andrey Morsin	Dimitris Kontopoulos	And Then...	3:27
3.	"Танцы" (Tantsy)	Andrey Morsin	Dimitris Kontopoulos	Dances	3:20
4.	"Небеса-ладони" (Nebesa-ladoni)	Andrey Morsin	Dimitris Kontopoulos, Ani Lorak	Sky-Hands	3:08
5.	"Солнце" (Solntse)	Andrey Morsin	Dimitris Kontopoulos	Sun	3:33
6.	"Мечта о тебе" (Mechta o tebe)	Andrey Morsin	Dimitris Kontopoulos, Ani Lorak	Dream of You	3:25
7.	"Дальние страны" (Dal'niye strany)	Andrey Morsin	Dimitris Kontopoulos, Ani Lorak	Distant Countries	3:23
8.	"Идеальный мир" (Ideal'ny mir)	Andrey Morsin	Dimitris Kontopoulos, Ani Lorak	Ideal World	3:10
9.	"Пламя" (Plamya)	Andrey Morsin	Dimitris Kontopoulos	Flame	2:36
10.	"Нелюбовь" (Nelyubov')	Andrey Morsin	Dimitris Kontopoulos, Ani Lorak	Non-Love	3:04
11.	"Крылья чудес" (Kryl'ya chudes)	Andrey Morsin	Dimitris Kontopoulos	Wings of Miracles	3:25
12.	"С неба в небо" (S neba v nebo – Russian version of "Shady Lady")	Karen Kavaleryan	Philipp Kirkorov	From Sky to Sky	3:00
13.	"I'm Alive" (English version of "Солнце")	Andrey Morsin	Dimitris Kontopoulos		3:35
14.	"Shady Lady"	Karen Kavaleryan	Philipp Kirkorov		2:58

DVD
No.	Title	Director	Length
1.	"Солнце"	Katya Tsarik	4:19
2.	"Shady Lady"	Katya Tsarik	2:58
3.	"I'm Alive"	Katya Tsarik	4:19
4.	"Shady Lady" (Remix)	Katya Tsarik	4:28
5.	"А дальше…"	Andrey Novoselov	3:24

== Personnel ==
- Ani Lorak – Vocals, Producer
- Philipp Kirkorov – Executive Producer
- Dimitris Kontopoulos – Sound producer, Keyboards, programming, arrangement
- Victoria Halkiti – Backing vocals
- Aris Binis – Recording and mastering
- Paul Stefanidis Viking Lounge Mastering studio – Mastering
- Janis Grigoriu – Bass guitar
- Spyros Kodakis – Acoustic guitar & Electric guitar
- Alkis Misirlis – Drums
- Andrei Batura – Design
- Andrew Davidovsky – Photography
- Dmitry Peretrutov – Photography
- George Kalfamanolis – Photography

== Release history ==
Country	Date
Russia	May 2009
Ukraine	May 2009
