= Solntse =

Solntse may refer to:

- The Sun (2005 film), a Russian biographical film
- Solntse (album), a 2009 album by Ani Lorak
- Solntse (TV channel), Russian TV channel
