= Tralli-Valli =

Studio album by Verka Serduchka

Studio album by Verka Serduchka
- Released: 2006
- Recorded: 2005–2006
- Venue: Kyiv, Ukraine
- Studio: Mamamusic Studio
- Genre: Pop music
- Length: 43:31
- Language: Russian
- Label: Mamamusic
- Producer: Andrey Danilko; Yury Nikitin

Verka Serduchka chronology
Zhenikha khotela. Neizdannoye (2004)	Tralli-Valli (2006)	Dancing Europe (2007)

Singles from Tralli-Valli
- 1. "Sama sebe" Released: 2 November 2005; 2. "Trali-Vali" Released: 6 December 2005; 3. "Khorosho krasavitsam" Released: 29 May 2006; 4. "A ya smeyus" Released: 13 October 2006; 5. "Beri vsyo" Released: 5 December 2006

Professional ratings
Review scores
Source	Rating
Miamusic	4.75/10

Tralli-Valli (Russian: Трали-Вали) is the third studio album by Ukrainian singer Verka Serduchka released in 2006 by Mamamusic.

== Overview ==
The new album marks the collaboration between Andrey Danilko ang songwriter Tatyana Zaluzhnya, better known as Lyubasha. She is the author of the music and lyrics of most of the songs on the album. Two songs on the album were written by Arkady Gartsman. Danilko Danilko remained in the role of producer and arranger. According to the artist, the album turned out to be of high quality and too good for Serduchka. Humor skits were recorded for the album, and the final track list included two of them. The album was recorded in 2005–2006 at Mamamusic Studio in Kyiv.

For the first time, a new song from the album "Sama sebe" was played on radio stations in October 2005. A live performance of the song took place at Lyubasha's benefit concert in the Kremlin on 15 November 2005, the song "Lyubi menya" also was performed.

Some songs from the album were included in the soundtrack of the musical "The Adventures of Verka Serdyuchka", which was shown on New Year's Eve on 31 December 2005 on the Ukrainian TV channel Inter. In Russia, Channel One refused to broadcast the musical. The film features the songs "Khorosho krasavitsam", "Kiyevsky vokzal", "Lyubi menya", "Plakat ili radovatsya", "A ya smeyus" and "Trali-Vali".

The album was released in August 2006. There were three versions of the cover's color scheme: blue, pink, and light green.

== Track listing ==
No.	Title	Writer(s)	Length
1.	"Intro "V smysle nachalo""	Andrey Danilko	0:33
2.	"Lyubi menya"	Lyubasha	2:05
3.	"Khorosho krasavitsam"	Lyubasha	3:24
4.	"Beri vsyo (Chto u menya est)"	Lyubasha	3:23
5.	"Trali-vali"	Lyubasha	3:04
6.	"Plakat ili radovatsya"	Lyubasha	3:35
7.	"A ya smeyus"	Lyubasha	3:16
8.	"Scenka 1"	Danilko	0:19
9.	"Pomada"	Danilko; Arkady Gartsman	3:38
10.	"Kiyevsky vokzal"	Lyubasha	3:14
11.	"SMS-ochka"	Danilko; Gartsman	3:07
12.	"Sama sebe"	Lyubasha	3:04
13.	"Scenka 2"	Danilko	1:02

Bonus-Video
No.	Title	Director(s)	Length
1.	"Khorosho krasavitsam" (2005)	Filatovich	4:14
2.	"Trali-vali" (2006)	Aleksander Filatovich	4:00
3.	"A ya smeyus" (2005)	Semyon Gorov	3:19

== Personnel ==
Musicians

- Andrey Danilko – lead vocals (all tracks), songwriting (1, 8, 9, 11, 13), production (all tracks)
- Lyubasha – songwriting (2–7, 10, 12)
- Arkady Gartsman – songwriting (9, 10)
- "Theater Danilko" – background vocals (3)
- Natalia Gura – background vocals (2–4, 12)
- Gennady Krupnik – background vocals (2–4, 12)
- Sasha Belkina – background vocals (4, 5, 12)
- Vasily Goldakovsky – background vocals (5)
- Sergey Dobrovolsky – guitar (3)
- Sergey Rybalkin – guitar (5, 10)
- Anatoly Plotnikov – bass guitar (5, 6, 9, 10)
- Andrey Kuzmenchuk – drums (5–7, 9–11), percussions (5)
- Alexander Rukomoynikov – saxophone (5, 9, 10)
- Sergey Khomenko – trumpet (5, 10)
- Anton Buryko – trumpet (5, 9, 10)
- Sergey Sulima – trombone (5, 10)
- Konstantin Strelchenko – bayan (5–7, 10)
- Sergey Trotsenko – bayan (9)
- Vyacheslav Filonov – violin (5, 10)
- Yevgeny Mezentsev – balalaika (5, 6)
- Maxim Gladetsky – double bass (11)

Technical

- Alexey Khvatsky – arrangement (2–7, 9–12)
- Vladimir Bebeshko – production of background vocals
- Sergey Dobrovolsky – recording, mixing, mastering (2–7, 9–12)
- Ilya Klimov – recording, mixing (skits)

Studios

- Mamamusic Studio (2005–2006, Kyiv) – recording, mixing (all tracks)

Management and marketing

- Yury Nikitin – management, executive production
- Igor Klinkov – personal management
- Dmitry Peretrutov – photography
- Yelena Araslanova – design

== Charts ==
Singles
Year	Title	Peak chart positions	
Year	Title	CIS	Moscow
2005	"Sama sebe" (featuring Lyubasha)	99	—
2005	"Trali-Vali"	42	17
2006	"Khorosho krasavitsam"	23	78
2006	"A ya smeyus"	95	96
2006	"Beri vsyo"	69	—
"—" denotes a recording that did not chart.
