= The Crazy Day or The Marriage of Figaro =

- DVD cover with Philipp Kirkorov, Lolita Milyavskaya and Boris Khoshnyansky
- Directed by: Semen Gorov
- Starring: Sofia Rotaru; Philipp Kirkorov
- Countries of origin: Russia; Ukraine
- Original language: Russian

Production
- Running time: 131 minutes

Original release
- Network: NTV
- Release: 31 December 2003
- Network: Inter
- Release: 1 January 2004

Crazy Day or The Marriage of Figaro (Russian: Безумный день, или женитьба Фигаро) is a modern comedy musical staged by television channels NTV (Russia) and Inter (Ukraine) in association with Melorama Production, under direction of Semen Gorov in 2003, based on the 1784 Pierre Beaumarchais' play The Marriage of Figaro. The musical was aired for the first time on the New Year's night of 2004.

== Plot ==
The day before his wedding, handsome and merry Figaro, played by Boris Hvoshnyansky, learns of the bride Susanna (Anastasia Stotskaya), but he has a rival - voluptuous Count Almaviva, played by Philip Kirkorov. Earl intends to use the old right of the first night in his possessions and to steal from the lovers their happiness. The case becomes more complicated as another lover - Marceline (Sofia Rotaru) claims her love for Figaro as well, requiring a considerable amount of money to return and marry her. Figaro uses infinitely jealousy count to his wife Rosine, played in the movie by Lolita Miliavskaya. The reason for the jealousy becomes innocent infatuation by Kerubino young countess' page, who played by Andrei Danilko. A whole series of changing, humorous situations and misunderstandings leads finally to all the love and harmony. Figaro gets his parents and wife. The Earl once again loves his Rosine, as small Cherubin successfully avoided serving in the army.

== Cast ==
- Philipp Kirkorov as Count Almaviva
- Lolita Milyavskaya as Countess Rosine
- Boris Khoshnyansky as Figaro
- Anastasiya Stotskaya as Suzanne
- Sofia Rotaru as Marceline
- Boris Moiseev as Antonio the gardener
- Ani Lorak as Fanchette
- Andriy Danylko as Cherubin
- Vitalii Linetskyi as Bazile
- Vladimir Goryansky as Don Guzman Brid'Oison (judge)
