= Ani Lorak =

Ukrainian-born Russian singer (born 1978)

- Ані Лорак; Ани Лорак
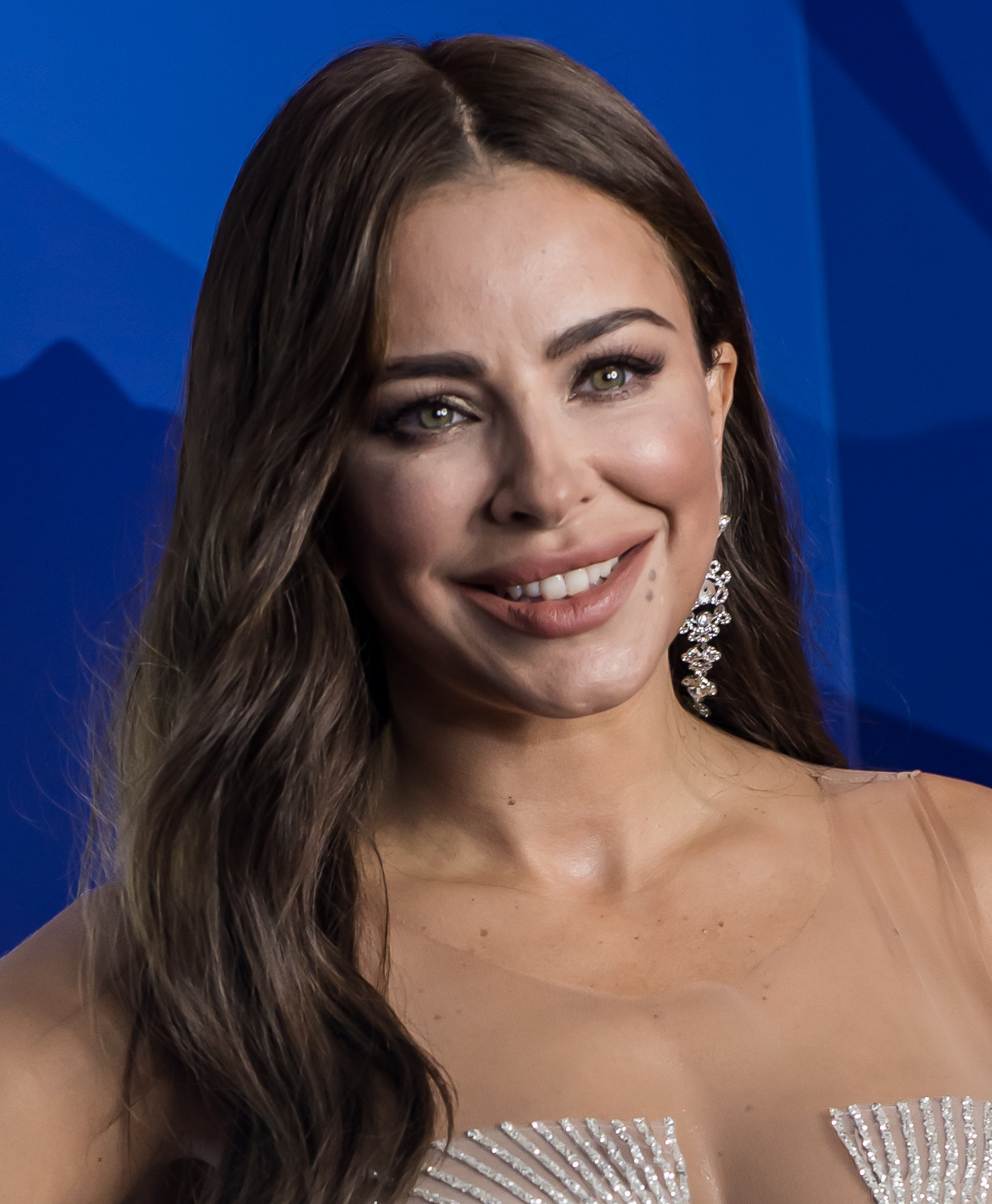
- Lorak in 2021
- Born: Karolina Myroslavivna Kuiek; 27 September 1978 (age 48); Kitsman, Ukrainian SSR, Soviet Union
- Citizenship: Ukraine; Russia
- Occupation: Singer
- Years active: 1996–present
- Spouse: Murat Nalçacıoğlu (m. 2009; div. 2019)
- Children: 1
- Musical career
- Genres: Pop; Adult Contemporary; Soul; Pop Rock; Dance Pop; Synth Pop
- Instruments: Vocals; piano
- Labels: Soyuz-Ukraina; Rostok; RG Music; Lavina Music; Moon; UMG; Warner Music Russia
- Website: anilorak.ua

Karolina Myroslavivna Kuiek (Note: Ukrainian: Кароліна Мирославівна Куєк, IPA: [kɐroˈl⁽ʲ⁾inɐ mɪroˈslɑwiu̯nɐ kʊˈjɛk]; Russian: Каролина Мирославовна Куек.) (born 27 September 1978), better known as Ani Lorak, (Note: Ukrainian: Ані Лорак, IPA: [ˈɑn⁽ʲ⁾i ˈlɔrɐk]; Russian: Ани Лорак.) is a Ukrainian and Russian singer. Having been awarded the title of People's Artist of Ukraine (revoked in 2024), she has been cited as one of the most influential and popular women in Ukraine, and has also been ranked as one of the most beautiful women from Eastern Europe. In 2014, she reported the highest income of all singers in Ukraine.

After her performance of the song "Shady Lady" while representing Ukraine in the Eurovision Song Contest 2008, Lorak began gaining considerable fame outside of the former Soviet Union, coming in second place behind "Believe" by Russian singer Dima Bilan. In 2018, she received a ZD Award in the category for Best Singer of the Year.

In October 2022, Lorak was sanctioned by the Ukrainian government because she continued to work and live in Russia after the beginning of the Russian invasion of Ukraine in February 2022. Among other restrictions, she was deprived of all Ukrainian state honours bestowed upon her and also prohibited from entering the country for five years. She received Russian citizenship in 2025.

== Early life and family ==
Lorak was born in the provincial city of Kitsman, Chernivtsi Oblast in Western Ukraine. She lived in the same house as Hero of Ukraine, singer and composer Volodymyr Ivasyuk, who spent his childhood, as Lorak's maternal grandfather had bought it from the Ivasyuks after they had decided to move away from Kitsman. Prior to her birth, her parents – a journalist and an announcer – had separated, however, her mother chose to still give Lorak her father's surname upon her birth.

Lorak developed the desire to become a singer as early as the age of four. She often performed at various school vocal competitions. As a child, she listened a lot to Russian singers such as Alla Pugacheva and Larisa Dolina, which were popular at the time she was young.

Speaking Ukrainian as her native language, Lorak was raised by a single mother. After having lived in Kitsman for several years, the family moved to Chernivtsi, where they lived in poverty. From the age of six until seventh class, she and her brothers were placed in a foster home in Chernivtsi as her mother was unable to provide for her children full-time. When she was nine, her eldest brother Serhii died while in combat during the Soviet–Afghan War. When the family was given an apartment in Chernivtsi, Lorak was subject to severe bullying in her new school due to her poor background.

== Career ==
=== 1992–1998: Early career in Ukraine and first albums ===
In 1992, at the age of 13, she took part in the Chernivtsi singing competition Pervotsvit, which she won. There, she met Yuriy Falyosa, who became her first producer. As a result, at the age of 15, she signed her first professional contract for the duration of ten years. In that timeframe, as part of her contract duties, she was not allowed to marry or give birth.

Kuiek became known as Ani Lorak from March 1995 onwards after she took part in the popular children's music television programme Morning Star on Channel One Russia. Intending to perform there mononymously as Karolina, she was told that that was undesirable as there was another famous singer at the time in Russia who performed under that pseudonym. As a result, the stage name "Ani Lorak" was invented, which was the name "Karolina" read backwards.

After participating in "Morning Star", Lorak's star started to rise in Ukraine. In the summer of 1995, Lorak was one of the laureates of the Chervona Ruta festival, that year held in Sevastopol and Simferopol, which led to her definite breakthrough in the Ukrainian show business. Ani Lorak moved to Kyiv later that year to start recording her first album. She was named "Discovery of the Year" at the popular Ukrainian festival Tavria Games in 1996. The same year she released her first Russian-language album, "Khochu letat" (I Want to Fly).

Lorak continued recording new songs in 1997. Her two videos, "Manekenschitsa" and "Bozhe moy," were filmed and the latter became a soundtrack to the movie "The Right to Choose". In the spring of 1998, her new video, "Ya vernus," was shot and in December Lorak's second Russian-language album "Ya vernus" was released. The mastering of this album took place in New York. Simultaneously, her two music videos "O moya lyubov" and "Dozhdlivy gorod" were filmed to accompany her new album.

=== 1999–2005: Honoured Artist of Ukraine, Ukrainian albums and first Eurovision attempt ===
At the outset of 1999, Lorak started her first extensive and international touring, performing in the United States, France, Germany, Hungary, and in every major city of Ukraine. In 1999, she earned the title of Honoured Artist of Ukraine, that was deprived in 2024. That same year, she got acquainted with Igor Krutoy, who wrote the composition "Zerkala" for her, which brought her more initial fame in Russia.

In 2000, she released her third album with Falyosa as the main producer, titled "www.anilorak.com," containing Russian, Ukrainian, and English compositions. She returned to singing completely in Ukrainian again a year later, releasing her fourth album, "Tam, de ty ye...". This was followed by a second album in Ukrainian, titled "Ani Lorak" in 2004, which mostly had the same songs as her 2000 album. In 2004-2005 Ani Lorak was a UN GoodWill Ambassador in Ukraine for HIV/AIDS.

In 2005, Ani Lorak made her first attempt to perform at the Eurovision Song Contest and was virtually certain to sing the home country's entry in Kyiv, but ultimately failed to be selected. Her narrow defeat in the 2005 national pre-selection competition was particularly controversial, given that the winners – GreenJolly – were only added later and did not have to qualify for the final by winning one of the fifteen preliminary heats, unlike all other finalists. However, their song "Razom nas bahato", had a larger societal impact at the time, following the Orange Revolution. Lorak finished in second place in the Ukrainian national final with the song "A Little Shot Of Love". Afterwards, she released her first and only English-language album Smile.

=== 2006–2012: Changes of producer, Eurovision 2008 and Solntse ===
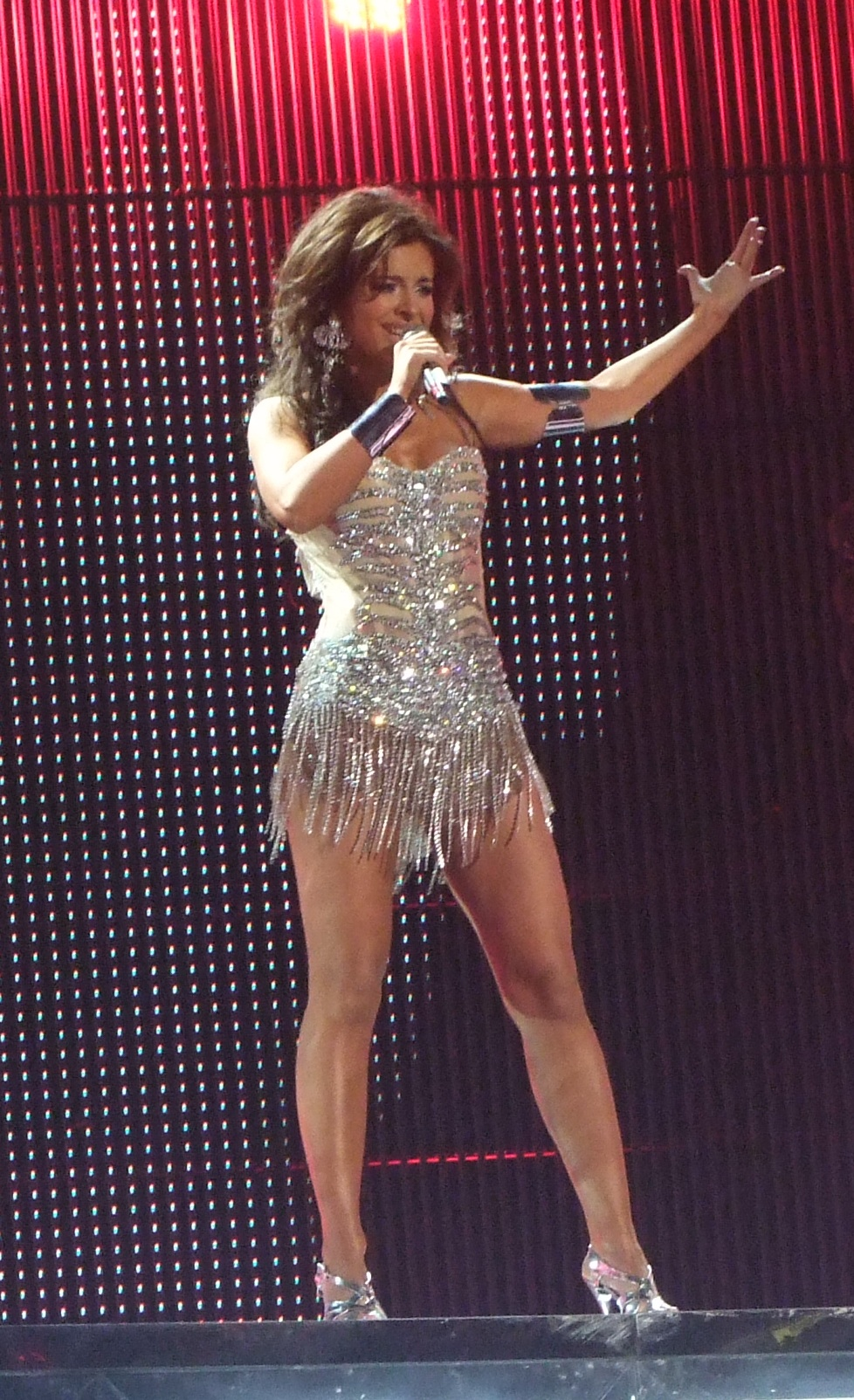
Lorak performing in Belgrade during the semi-finals of the Eurovision Song Contest 2008

In 2006, this was followed by "Rozkazhi," her ninth album, again fully in Ukrainian. Shortly after the album's release, Lorak ended her contract with Falyosa and started to work with producer Konstantin Meladze. That same year, Lorak released a duet with Meladze's brother Valery Meladze, which became Lorak's first radio hit in Russia.

In 2007, Lorak's friend and colleague Philipp Kirkorov successfully produced Belarus' Eurovision 2007 effort and opted to bring Lorak to Eurovision in Belgrade in 2008. In late 2007, it was announced that Ukrainian public broadcaster NTU had internally selected Lorak to represent the country at Eurovision in Belgrade, and that the public and a jury would choose the song. It was the third and last internal selection the country had before internally selecting Go_A in 2021. On 23 February 2008, Lorak performed five potential entries in a special show. The song "Shady Lady", written by Karen Kavaleryan and Philipp Kirkorov won the show with a landslide victory.

Shortly after, she recorded a Russian version of her Eurovision song "Shady Lady" with the title "S neba v nebo." Lorak, similar to Dmitry Koldun a year prior, held an extensive promo campaign and visited other countries to present her song, including Malta, Russia, Bulgaria, Spain and Germany. At the Eurovision Song Contest 2008 in Belgrade, she sang the song "Shady Lady" in the second semi-final on 23 May 2008, winning a place in the final. She took second place in the final after Dima Bilan, giving Ukraine its second runner-up position in a row and its third-best score of all time. Italian designer Roberto Cavalli designed the ornate dress for Lorak's performance at the contest, which was made with Swarovski Diamonds. Greek choreographer Fokas Evangelinos designed her stage show, involving four dancers. Prior to performing in the final, Lorak had won the Artistic Award, voted the most popular entry among the former winners of the contest.

After her second-place finish at Eurovision, Lorak returned to Ukraine in newfound stardom. For her result, she and Philipp Kirkorov were given the title People's Artist of Ukraine, deprived for both in 2024. In Chernivtsi, where her career had taken off in 1992, she received a star on the Star Alley in the centre of the city.

In 2009, she released her tenth album, Solntse, which was produced by Yuliia Kyryliuk, who had previously produced her Eurovision effort. The album became her most successful effort until that moment. In October 2009, Lorak was ranked 41st in a top 100 of "most influential women in Ukraine" compiled by experts for the Ukrainian magazine Focus.

In 2010, Lorak released a compilation album titled "The Best". At the time, she continued releasing, almost exclusively in Russian and performed in countries in the Russian-speaking world.

=== 2013–2017: Criticism for performing in Russia, Razve ty lyubil... and tour show Karolina ===
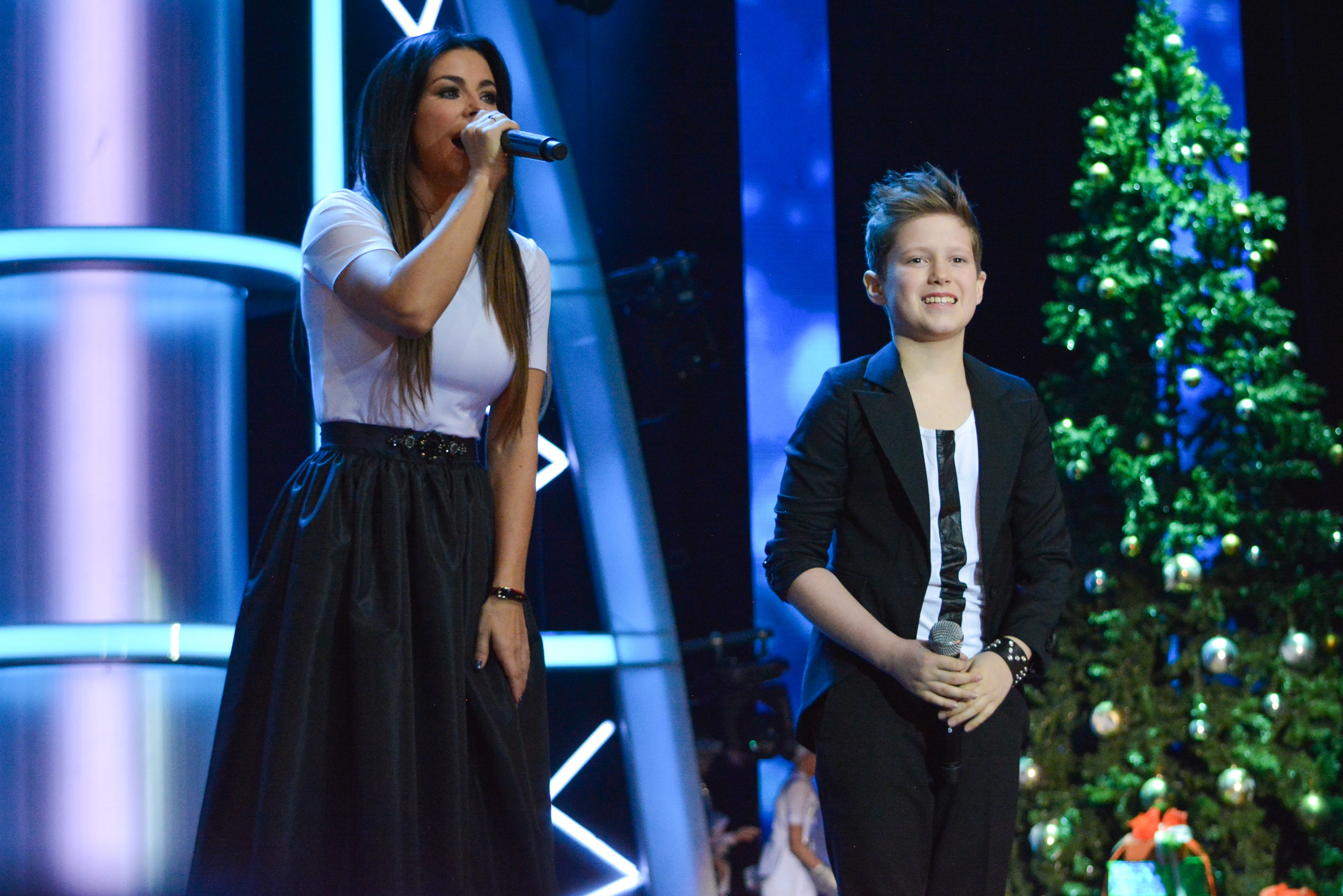
Ani Lorak performing in 2014.

In 2013, Lorak returned to Greece to produce her fourteenth "Zazhigay serdtse" together with Kontopoulos. Diana Golde and Ruslan Kvinta also wrote several songs for the album. From March to June 2014, Lorak was a coach on the fourth season "Holos Krainy". During this season, she coached singer Mykyta Aliekieiev, whom she also helped to start his career.

In the wake of the annexation of Crimea and the war in the Donbas, Lorak continued performing in Russia. This led to severe criticism from several politicians and parts of the Ukrainian society. During several of her concerts in Odesa and Kyiv in 2014, protesters gathered in front of the concert venues. In November 2014, activists gathered to protest against her concert in the Palace of Ukraine. A concert in Odesa was subsequently cancelled as a result.

Lorak's appearance in the New Year's programme on the television channel Inter was subject to severe criticism on social media. Her star on the Star Alley of Chernivtsi was first vandalised with the text "PTN GFY" and on the night of 29 to 30 January 2015, stolen. In May 2015, the Chernivtsi City Council decided to not reinstate a new star for Lorak.

Meanwhile, Lorak scored large commercial success in Russia, performing several duets alongside singer Grigory Leps, which included "Ukhodi po-angliyski" and "Zerkala," which both fared well in the Russian radio charts. At the end of 2016, she released her next Russian-language album Razve ty lyubil?.... In 2017, she toured the region with the tour "Karolina."

=== 2018–present: tour shows DIVA and The BEST ===
At the start of 2018, Lorak started her next tour, titled DIVA, which received positive reviews from music critics. A live album and recording of the tour were released in 2020. In Autumn 2018, Lorak became a coach at the seventh series of The Voice of Russia.

In August 2019, she debuted her jubileum concert tour THE BEST. In late 2019, Lorak released her twelfth studio album Za mechtoy, for which she wrote the majority of the songs herself.

In 2022, she did not openly speak out against the Russian invasion of Ukraine, the only apparent public reference she made about the war was on New Year's Day 2023 when she wrote (in Ukrainian) on Instagram that her brother "was forced to drink Jack Daniels in the basement to the sounds of bombs." In April 2023 she used the words "this situation" to describe the war and stated that she had chosen the position "I will not pay attention to it" because she had "to live my life, take care of my child, and keep myself in shape." In Ukraine she is being heavily criticised for hiding the fact of Russian aggression against Ukraine and lasting cooperation with Russian media. In April 2023 she stated that this attitude in Ukraine hurt her "because Ukraine is in my soul".

== Business ventures ==
In 2005, Ani Lorak and her fiancé Murat opened the Angel Lounge, a restaurant that specializes in Mediterranean cuisine in the center of Kyiv. In 2009, they opened a Ukrainian travel agency called "Holiday Travel", which is a sub-division of "Turtess Travel", a company Murat works for. In 2010, Lorak became an Oriflame advert. She participated in several catalogues and developed a new fragrance called Chiffon by Ani Lorak.

In 2011, Lorak was announced the fifth richest singer in Ukraine, with her team's revenues amounting to $2.35 million that year. Her typical fee is $25,000 to $40,000 per concert.

== Personal life ==
Lorak was married to Murat Nalçacıoğlu, a Turkish hotel manager and travel agent, from 2009 to 2019. On 9 June 2011, she gave birth to their daughter Sophia.

== Sanctions ==
On 19 October 2022, Ani Lorak was added to Ukraine's sanctions list and is prohibited from entering the country until 2027.

== Charity ==
Lorak spends a lot of time on charitable activities. Since 2004–2005, Lorak has been a UN Goodwill Ambassador on HIV/AIDS in Ukraine. UNICEF and UN in Ukraine have awarded a commendation to Lorak for assistance and help to HIV-positive citizens of Ukraine. In 2005, Lorak was conferred with the St. Stanislav Order of the 4th degree and the Officer's Cross "for strengthening the international authority of Ukraine, for the high professionalism, great creative achievements, charity and adherence to the ideals of chivalry."

In April 2023 publicly denied rumours that she was donating money to the Armed Forces of Ukraine following the February 2022 Russian invasion of Ukraine, claiming that those rumours were "obvious slander, manipulation" and that she "can't help the military for military needs" because this was not in her nature.

In September 2023 Lorak held a concert in Moscow (Russia) of which some of the revenue was sent to a fund that helped to relocate children from Russian-occupied territories of Ukraine to Russia.

== Albums ==
=== Studio albums ===
| Title | Details | Certifications | Sales |
|---|---|---|---|
| Khochu letat (I Want To Fly) | Released: 1996; Label: Holy Music • NAC; Format: Cassette, CD | — | — |
| Ya vernus (I'll Be Back) | Released: December 1998; Label: Soyuz-Ukraina; Format: Cassette, CD | — | — |
| Tam, de ty ye (There Where You Are) | Released: 18 December 2001; Label: RG Music; Format: Cassette, CD | UKR: Gold | UKR: 50,000 |
| Ani Lorak | Released: 6 March 2004; Label: Lavina Music; Format: Cassette, CD | UKR: Gold | UKR: 50,000 |
| Smile | Released: 30 September 2005; Label: Lavina Music; Format: Cassette, CD | — | — |
| Rozkazhy (Tell Me) | Released: 8 May 2006; Label: Lavina Music; Format: Cassette, CD | UKR: Gold | UKR: 50,000 |
| 15 | Released: 24 October 2007; Label: Lavina Music; Format: Cassette, CD | — | — |
| Solntse (The Sun) | Released: 6 May 2009; Label: Moon • CD Land; Format: CD, DVD, Digital | — | — |
| Zazhigay serdtse (Fire Up Your Heart) | Released: 22 September 2013; Label: Moon • United Music Group; Format: CD, Vinyl, Digital | — | — |
| Razve ty lyubil (Did You Love Me) | Released: 1 October 2016; Label: United Music Group; Format: CD, Digital | — | — |
| Za mechtoy (For The Dream) | Released: 10 October 2019; Label: Warner Music Russia; Format: Digital | — | — |
| Ya zhiva (I'm Alive) | Released: 12 November 2021; Label: Warner Music Russia; Format: Digital | — | — |

=== Live albums ===
| Title | Details |
|---|---|
| Karolina | Released: 2 June 2015; Label: Moon; Format: CD, Digital |
| Diva | Released: 12 April 2020; Label: United Music Group; Format: Digital |

=== Compilation albums ===
| Title | Details |
|---|---|
| www.anilorak.com | Released: 18 May 2000; Label: Rostok; Format: Cassette, CD |
| The Best | Released: August 2010; Label: Moon; Format: CD, Digital |
| Izbrannoye (Favourite) | Released: 15 August 2011; Label: Gala Records; Format: CD, DVD |

=== Remix albums ===
| Title | Details |
|---|---|
| Mriy pro mene (Dream About Me) | Released: 31 May 2003; Label: Lavina Music; Format: Cassette, CD |

=== Video albums ===
| Title | Details |
|---|---|
| Tam, de ty ye (There Where You Are) | Released: 2003; Label: Lavina Music; Format: VHS |
| Solntse (The Sun) | Released: 20 January 2011; Label: Moon; Format: DVD |
| Karolina | Released: 1 November 2014; Label: Moon; Format: DVD |

== Songs ==
=== Singles ===
| Year | Title | Peak chart positions | | | | | Certifications | Album |
| Year | Title | UKR | GRE | LAT | RUS | SWE | Certifications | Album |
|---|---|---|---|---|---|---|---|---|
| 2006 | "100 Kisses" (with Oleksandr Ponomariov) | — | — | — | — | — | | Non-album single |
| 2007 | "Let Me Go (Car Song)" (feat. Starlovers) | — | — | — | — | — | | Non-album single |
| 2008 | "Shady Lady" | — | 2 | — | — | 57 | | Solntse |
| 2009 | "Увлечение" (with Timur Rodriguez) | — | — | 25 | — | — | | The Best |
| 2013 | "Оранжевые сны" | 1 | — | — | 43 | — | | Zazhigay serdtse |
| 2013 | "Забирай" | 5 | — | — | 29 | — | | Razve ty lyubil |
| 2013 | "Зеркала" (with Grigory Leps) | 1 | — | — | 17 | — | | Razve ty lyubil |
| 2013 | "Снится сон" | — | — | — | — | — | | Non-album single |
| 2014 | "Медленно" | 1 | — | — | 22 | — | | Razve ty lyubil |
| 2014 | "Балада про мальви" | — | — | — | — | — | | Non-album single |
| 2014 | "I'm Alive" | — | — | — | — | — | GRE: Platinum | Solntse |
| 2015 | "Корабли" | 3 | — | — | 45 | — | | Razve ty lyubil |
| 2015 | "Без тебя" | 50 | — | — | — | — | | Razve ty lyubil |
| 2015 | "Don't Give Up" (feat. Kirill Slepukha) | 49 | — | — | — | — | | Non-album single |
| 2015 | "Осенняя любовь" | — | — | — | 7 | — | | Razve ty lyubil |
| 2015 | "Уходи по-английски" (with Grigory Leps) | — | — | — | 62 | — | | Razve ty lyubil |
| 2016 | "Удержи моё сердце" | 13 | — | — | 57 | — | | Razve ty lyubil |
| 2016 | "Я не могу сказать" (with Emin) | — | — | — | — | — | | Prosti, moya lyubov |
| 2016 | "Разве ты любил" | — | — | — | 58 | — | | Razve ty lyubil |
| 2017 | "Сопрано" (with Mot) | 31 | — | — | 21 | — | | Dobraya muzyka klavish |
| 2017 | "Новый бывший" | 48 | — | — | 37 | — | | Non-album single |
| 2017 | "Проститься" (with Emin) | — | — | — | — | — | | Prosti, moya lyubov |
| 2018 | "Сумасшедшая" | — | — | — | 27 | — | | Non-album single |
| 2018 | "Сон" | 38 | — | — | 48 | — | | Za mechtoy |
| 2019 | "Я тебя ждала" | 32 | — | — | 64 | — | | Za mechtoy |
| 2019 | "Я в любви" | — | — | — | — | — | | Za mechtoy |
| 2019 | "Мы нарушаем" | — | — | — | 27 | — | | Za mechtoy |
| 2020 | "Ухожу" (with Misha Marvin) | — | — | — | — | — | | Non-album single |
| 2020 | "Твоей любимой" | 72 | — | — | 39 | — | | Non-album single |
| 2020 | "Страдаем и любим" | 70 | — | — | 35 | — | | Ya zhiva |
| 2021 | "Наполовину" | 70 | — | — | 48 | — | | Ya zhiva |
| 2021 | "Раздетая" | 67 | — | — | — | — | | Ya zhiva |
| 2021 | "Не отпускай" (with Sergey Lazarev) | — | — | — | — | — | | Non-album single |
| 2021 | "Бачила" | — | — | — | — | — | | Ya zhiva |
| 2021 | "Он" | — | — | — | — | — | | Ya zhiva |
| 2021 | "Не отпускай меня" | — | — | — | — | — | | Ya zhiva |
| 2022 | "Лабиринт" | — | — | — | 68 | — | | Остров |
| 2023 | "Обратный отсчет" | — | — | — | — | — | | Остров |
| 2023 | "Рядом, но не вместе" | — | — | — | 23 | — | | Остров |
"—" denotes a title that did not chart, or was not released in that territory.

=== Promotional singles ===
| Year | Title | Peak chart positions | | Album |
| Year | Title | GRE | SWE | Album |
|---|---|---|---|---|
| 2000 | "Ангел мрій моїх" | — | — | www.anilorak.com |
| 2008 | "Shady Lady" | 2 | 57 | Solntse |
| 2009 | "Солнце" | — | — | Solntse |
| 2010 | "Нежность рассвета" | — | — | Non-album single |
"—" denotes a title that did not chart, or was not released in that territory.

== Awards ==
=== 1992 ===
- Second prize of the Prevotsvit festival in Ukraine (Chernivtsi).

=== 1994 ===
- First prize of the international festival Veselad (Kyiv).
- First prize of the international festival Dolia (Chernivtsi).

=== 1995 ===
- Winner of the "Morning Star" television contest (Moscow).
- Second prize of the all-Ukrainian festival "Chervona Ruta" (Sevastopol).

=== 1996 ===
- Winner of the Super Final of the "Morning Star" television contest (Moscow).
- Winner in the "Finding of 1995" nomination of the "Tavriyski Igry" festival.
- Grand-Prix winner of the global competition of young performers "Big Apple Music-96" (New York).

=== 1997 ===
- Prize-winner of the "Song-97" festival (Moscow, Kyiv).
- Winner of the Grand-Prix of the President of Ukraine following the results of the all-Ukrainian festival "Song Vernissage-97".

=== 1998 ===
- Award winner in the "Singer of the Year" and "Pop Music of the Year" nominations of the "Tavriyski Ihry-98" festival.

=== 1999 ===
- Award winner in the "Singer of the Year" nomination of the "Tavriyski Ihry-99" festival.

=== 2000 ===
- The song "Zerkala" [Mirrors] was recognized as the best club release of 2000.

=== 2001 ===
- Award winner in the nomination "Singer of the Year" of the "Tavriyski Igry-2001" festival.
- "Ani Lorak Nazavzhdy" [Ani Lorak Forever] recognized as the best Ukrainian musical film of 2000.

=== 2002 ===
- The CD 'Tam de ty ye...' becomes Gold.
- Ani enters the Top 100 list of the sexiest women of the world.
- Ani Lorak recognized as "The Best Singer of the Year" on the "Tavriyski Igry-2002" festival.

=== 2003 ===
- Winner in the "Singer of the Year" nomination of the "Tavriyski Igry-2003" festival (Ukraine).
- Recognized as the "Singer of the Year 2002" by the ELLE magazine.

=== 2004 ===
- "Singer of the Year 2003", UBN Awards, UK.
- "Singer of the Year 2003" according to the ELLE magazine.
- Gold Disc for the "Ani Lorak" album.

=== 2005 ===
- Ani Lorak's composition "Мriy pro mene" [Dream about me] was recognized as the best song of 2004 at the "Zolotoy Gramofon" [Golden Gramophone] contest.
- The composition of Ani Lorak "Try zvychnykh slova" [Three usual words] recognized as the best song of 2004 - at the "Zolota Zharptytsia" [Golden Firebird] competition.
- Ani Lorak recognized as the best singer of 2004. Audience Choice Award "Zolota Zharptytsia".

=== 2006 ===
- Ani Lorak wins the international music award "Zolota Sharmanka" [Gold Sharmanka] for the song "Rozkazhy" [Tell me].
- Ani Lorak was recognized as the most beautiful woman of Ukraine by the readers of the VIVA magazine.
- The "Rozkazhy..." album becomes Gold according to sales results.

=== 2008 ===
- In May 2008, Ani Lorak became the silver prize winner of the Eurovision Song Contest 2008.
- Received the "Artistic Award Eurovision Song Contest," which is awarded to the best artist of the contest.
- According to the magazine "Focus," Ani Lorak is the No. 1 artist in the public interest.
- According to the magazine "Focus" Ani Lorak entered the top 100 most influential women in Ukraine.

=== 2009 ===
- According to Eurovision Song Contest Radio Ani Lorak with the song "Shady Lady" became "Best singer of 2008".
- In March 2009, Ani Lorak was awarded the "Person of the Year" award in the nomination "Idol of Ukrainians."

=== 2010 ===
- At the presentation of the annual WORLD FASHION AWARDS 2010 award, the International TV channel on World Fashion WORLD FASHION CHANNEL recognized Ani Lorak as a Fashion singer.
- In December, Ani Lorak received the Golden Gramophone for the song "For You" and was awarded the "Song of the Year" diploma as the author of music and the co-author of the words.

=== 2011 ===
- In March, at the awarding of the "Personality of the Year" award, Ani Lorak received the award in the "Star Solo" nomination.

=== 2012 ===
- In December Ani gets "Gold Gramophone" award for the song "Obnimi menya krepche" ("Hug Me Tight"), and the song "Obnimi Menya" ("Hug Me") awarded "Song of the Year."
- According to "Seven Days" magazine Ani Lorak is the most beautiful woman in Russia.

=== 2013 ===
- In March Ani Lorak became "the most beautiful woman" according to the Viva! magazine.
- At the ceremony "Persons of the Year, 2012" Ani Lorak got the Personality of Ukrainian Culture award.
- Ani Lorak got "Choreography of the Year" from RU.TV channel at the Russian Music Awards ceremony, which took place on 25 May.
- This summer at the Muz-TV 2013 Award in Moscow Ani Lorak was named as "The Best Performer of the Year" and got the long-awaited plate.

=== 2014 ===
- In May, Ani Lorak received awards from the music channel RU.TV in two categories: "Best duet" for a song with Grigory Leps "Mirrors" and "Karolina" show had won in the nomination "The best concert show of the year".
- In June, Ani Lorak became the owner of a special award from the recording company «Panik Records» for the sale of her English-language single, «I'm Alive» in the iTunes Store in Greece.
- On September 20 Ani Lorak took part in the annual ceremony EMA. Eurasian Music Award held at the Central Stadium in Almaty. The singer became the owner of the prestigious award in the category "Best Artist of Eurasia."
- In December, Ani Lorak received the "Golden Gramophone" award for song with Grigory Leps "Mirrors."
- And the singer became the winner of the "Song of the Year - 2014" award for the song "Slow" on "Inter" TV channel.

=== 2015 ===
- Ani Lorak won the nomination "Singer of the Year" and received the coveted samovar at the RU.TV Awards.
- In June, Ani Lorak became the "Singer of the Year" at MUZ-TV Awards, which took place in Astana.
- At the annual awards ceremony Fashion People Awards Ani Lorak received award in the nomination "Fashion singer of the year."
- In November, Ani Lorak received her fifth "Golden Gramophone" for the lyrical song "Ships".

=== 2016 ===
- Ani Lorak awarded as the most stylish singer by Fashion People Awards.

=== 2017 ===
- At the end of May, Ani Lorak and Mot win the nomination "Best duet of the year" with the song "Soprano" at the RU.TV Awards.
- In June, Ani Lorak and Emin win the "Fashion duet" award for their song "I can't tell" at the annual "Fashion People Awards" award ceremony.
- Later in June Ani Lorak received the award in the nomination "The Best Album of the Year" for the album "Didn't You Love Me?" at the MUZ-TV Awards.
- In September, Ani Lorak becomes the winner of the special nomination "High Plank" of the MUSICBOX Award.
- Ani Lorak became the leader of the popular vote of the First Channel and Odnoklassniki.
- Ani Lorak received her 9th statuette "Golden Gramophone" for a duet song with Moto "Soprano."
- At the ceremony of awarding the music award "Major League" from "New Radio" Ani Lorak and Moth became owners of the Golden Siren for the song "Soprano."
- In December, Ani Lorak received the diploma of the festival "Song of the Year" for the song "You Still Love."
- Ani Lorak and Mot got VK Music Award for the song "Soprano".

=== 2018 ===
- "The Best Female Singer of the Year," ZARA Music Awards.
- "Show of the Year," BraVo international music premia (DIVA).
- At the end of May, Ani Lorak's show DIVA gets the award as the best show of the year at RU.TV's 8th Russian Music Award of RU.TV.
- In the beginning of June, Ani Lorak's show DIVA is recognized as the best concert show of the year at the Fashion People Awards 2018 in Moscow.
- At the MUZ-TV Award 2018 Ani Lorak and Mot get the cherished award for the song "Soprano" - the best duet of the year.

=== 2024 ===
- Along with some other Ukrainian and Russian singers Karolina was deprived to be a holder of Merited Artist of Ukraine and People's Artist of Ukraine state awards.

== See also ==
- Russian pop music
- Pop music in Ukraine

== Notes ==
Achievements
| Preceded by Verka Serduchka with "Dancing Lasha Tumbai" | Ukraine in the Eurovision Song Contest; 2008 | Succeeded by Svetlana Loboda with "Be My Valentine! (Anti-Crisis Girl)" |
| Preceded by (Cyprus) Sophia Paraskeva and Alex Michael | Junior Eurovision Song Contest presenter 2009; With: Timur Miroshnychenko | Succeeded by (Belarus) Leila Ismailava and Dzianis Kurian |
| New title | Most beautiful by VIVA! 2005; With: Svyatoslav Vakarchuk | Succeeded by Natalia Mohylevska |
| Preceded by Oksana Marchenko | Most beautiful by VIVA! 2012 (2nd title) | Suspended Title next held by Tina Karol (2017) |
