= Shady Lady (Ani Lorak song) =

2008 single by Ani Lorak

Promotional single by Ani Lorak

from the album Solntse
- B-side: "The Dream of Brighter Day"; "I'll Be Your Melody"; "Ždu tebja"
- Released: April 2008
- Recorded: 2008
- Genre: Dance-pop; disco
- Length: 2:59
- Label: Virgin
- Composer: Philipp Kirkorov
- Lyricist: Karen Kavaleryan
- Producer: Dimitris Kontopoulos

Ani Lorak singles chronology
"Ya s toboy" (2007)	"Shady Lady" (2008)	"Ja Stanu Morem" (2008)

Music video
- "Shady Lady" on YouTube

Alternative cover
- Eurovision Promotional Cover

Eurovision Song Contest 2008 entry
- Country: Ukraine
- Artist: Ani Lorak
- Language: English
- Composer: Philipp Kirkorov
- Lyricist: Karen Kavaleryan

Finals performance
- Semi-final result: 1st
- Semi-final points: 152
- Final result: 2nd
- Final points: 230

Entry chronology
- ◄ "Dancing Lasha Tumbai" (2007)
- "Be My Valentine! (Anti-Crisis Girl)" (2009) ►

Official performance video
- "Shady Lady" (final) on YouTube

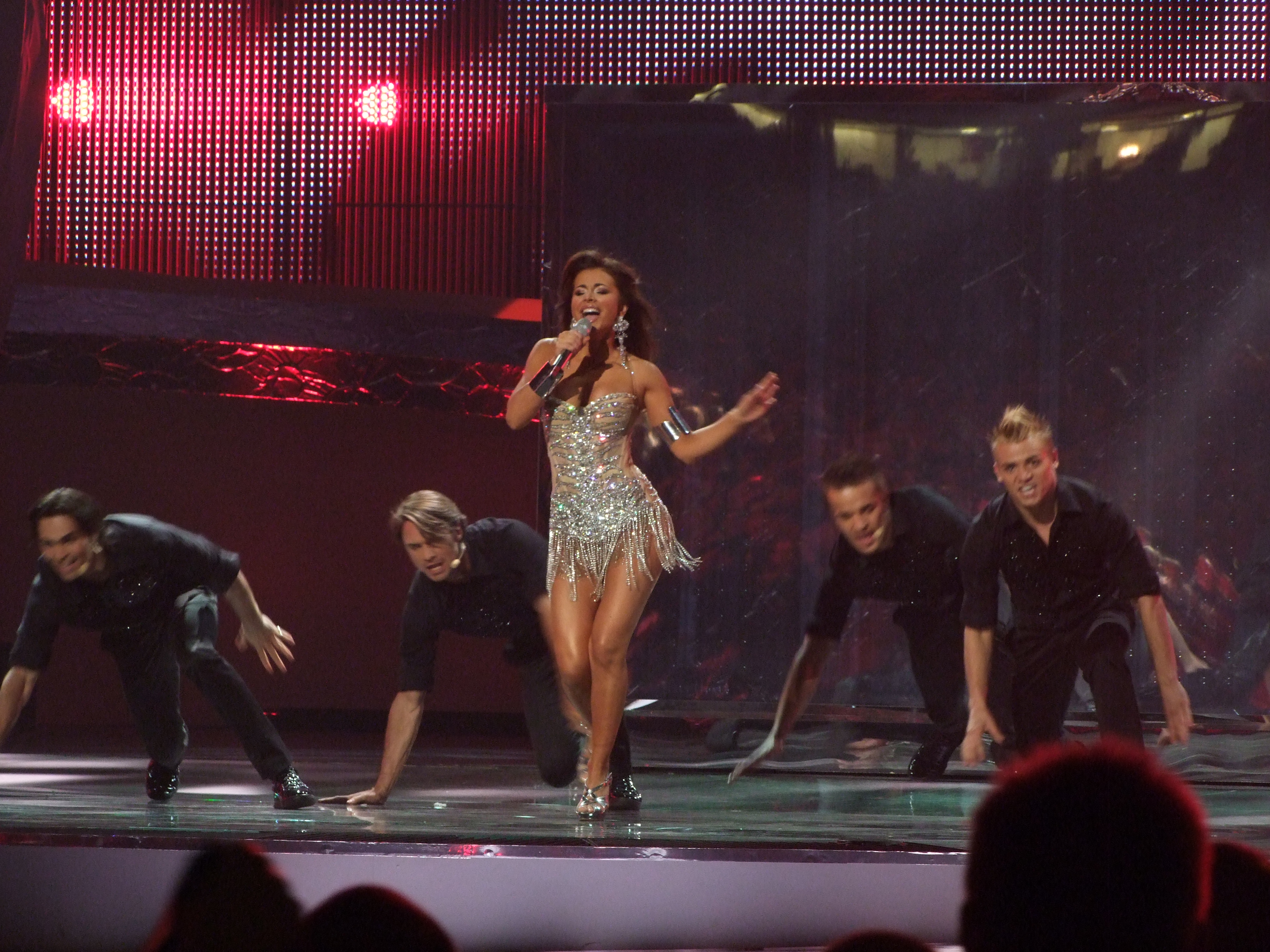
"Shady Lady" as performed by Lorak at Eurovision

"Shady Lady" is a song recorded by Ukrainian-born Russian singer Ani Lorak with music composed by Philipp Kirkorov and lyrics written by Karen Kavaleryan. It represented Ukraine in the Eurovision Song Contest 2008, held in Belgrade. She also released a Russian-language version of the song titled "S neba v nebo" (Russian: С неба в небо; transl. From Sky to Sky).

== Background ==
=== Conception ===
"Shady Lady" was composed by Philipp Kirkorov and written by Karen Kavaleryan. However, around the time of the contest there were many rumors in Greece stating that popular composer Dimitris Kontopoulos had actually composed the song. Although his name was not credited during the Eurovision Song Contest performances, it was later confirmed that Kontopoulos was indeed a producer of the song.

=== Selection ===
On 21 December 2007, the National Television Company of Ukraine (NTU) announced that they had internally selected Ani Lorak as their performer for the 53rd edition of the Eurovision Song Contest. On 23 February 2008, NTU held a national final to select the song she would perform at Eurovision. All five competing songs were performed by herself. "Shady Lady" won the competition becoming the Ukrainian entry for Eurovision.

The single itself has become very successful in Ukraine featuring two A-sides: "Shady Lady" and "Ja Stanu Morem" ("I'll Be a Sea"), which was also a Eurovision candidate. The single also featured the video of "Shady Lady" as a bonus track, while the other three Eurovision candidates were also included. It charted for over 30 weeks, peaking at number 1 on the official Ukrainian charts, while also faring well in neighbouring countries. She also released a Russian-language version of the song titled "С неба в небо" ("From Sky to Sky").

=== Eurovision ===
On 22 May 2008, the second semi-final of the Eurovision Song Contest was held in the Belgrade Arena in Belgrade hosted by Radio Television of Serbia (RTS) and broadcast live throughout the continent. Ani Lorak performed "Shady Lady" fourth in the running order, preceding Turkey's "Deli" by Mor ve Ötesi and preceding Lithuania's "Nomads in the Night" by Jeronimas Milius. The performance was staged and choreographed by Fokas Evangelinos. It received 152 points, placing 1st in a field of 19 and qualifying for the final.

On 24 May 2008, the grand final for the Eurovision Song Contest was held. Lorak performed the song 18th, the third year in a row that a Ukrainian entry had performed in this position, following Georgia's "Peace Will Come" by Diana Gurtskaya and preceding France's "Divine" by Sébastien Tellier. It received 230 points, despite only receiving the maximum 12 points only once, from Portugal, coming 2nd in a field of 25, behind Dima Bilan's song "Believe" for Russia.

=== Aftermath ===
On 21 November 2009, Lorak was one of the hosts of the Junior Eurovision Song Contest 2009, where she performed "Shady Lady" as part of the interval acts.

== Track listing ==
Ukrainian edition

1. "Shady Lady" (Philipp Kirkorov, Karen Kavaleryan)
2. "The Dream of Brighter Day" (Ani Lorak, Juri Sak)
3. "I'll Be Your Melody" ("Bozheny Kostroma")
4. "Ždu tebja" ("Waiting for You")
5. "Ja Stanu Morem" ("I'll Be a Sea")

Bonus track:

1. "Shady Lady" (video)

== Charts ==
=== Weekly charts ===
Weekly chart performance for "Shady Lady"
Chart (2008)	Peak position
Greece Airplay (Billboard)	2
Sweden (Sverigetopplistan)	57
Ukraine Airplay (TopHit)	22

Weekly chart performance for "S neba v nebo"
Chart (2008)	Peak position
Russia Airplay (TopHit)	52
Ukraine Airplay (TopHit)	1

=== Year-end charts ===
Year-end chart performance for "Shady Lady"
Chart (2008)	Position
Ukraine Airplay (TopHit)	80

Year-end chart performance for "S neba v nebo"
Chart (2008)	Position
Ukraine Airplay (TopHit)	83
