= Karen Kavaleryan =

Russian musician (born 1961)

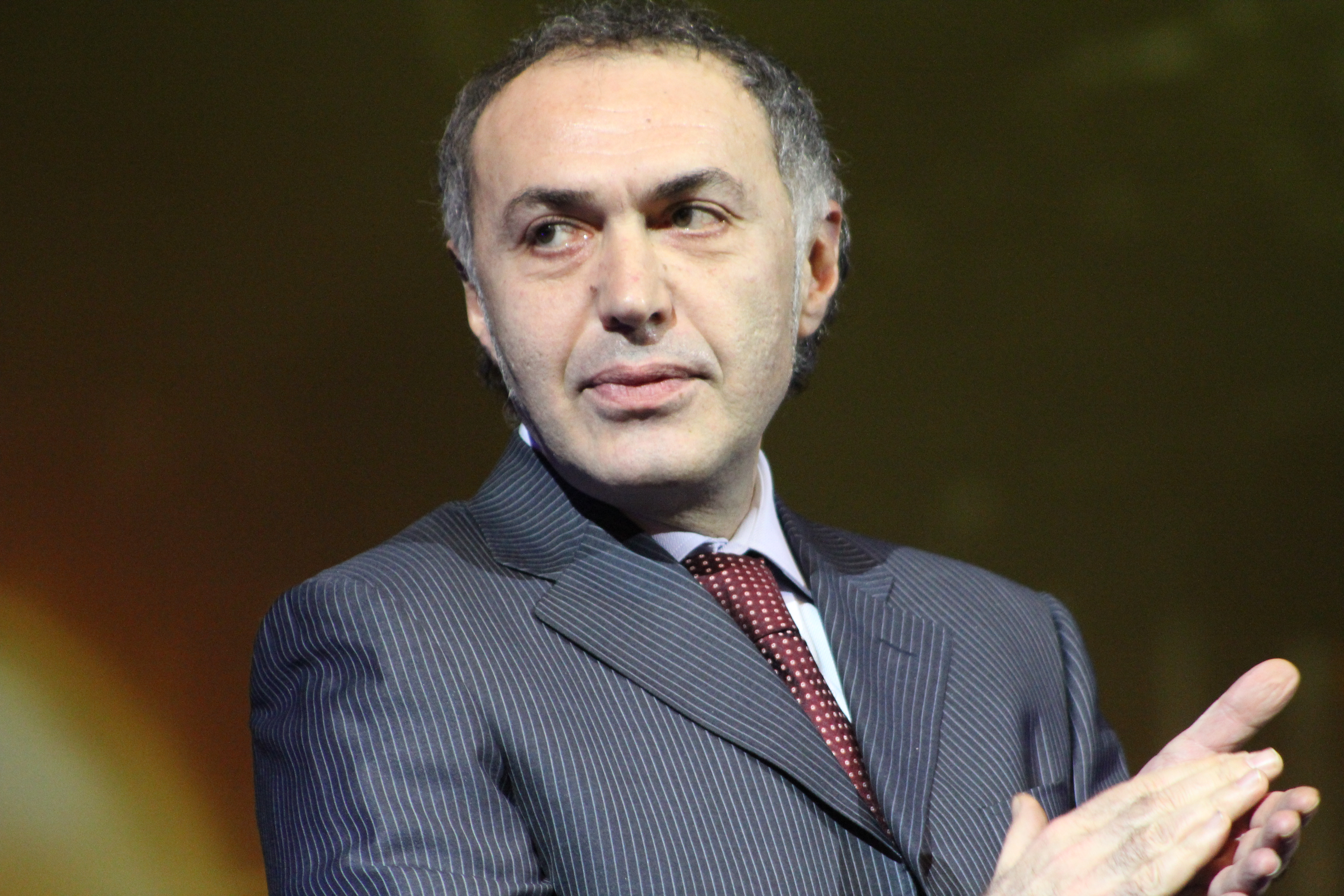
- Karen Kavaleryan in 2012

Background information
- Birth name: Karen Kavaleryan
- Born: June 5, 1961 (age 63); Moscow, Russian SFSR, Soviet Union
- Occupation: Lyricist
- Website: www.karen-kavaleryan.ru

Karen Kavaleryan (Armenian: Կարեն Կավալերյան; Russian: Каре́н Кавалеря́н; born 5 June 1961 in Moscow, Russian SFSR, Soviet Union) is a Russian-Armenian lyricist. He is known for his work in the Eurovision Song Contest.

Karen Kavaleryan is widely considered as the most successful Russian lyricist, he is 27 times finalist of "Song of the Year" gala, author of anthem of 2014 Winter Olympics and the final song 2014 Winter Paralympics, performed by José Carreras and Diana Gurtskaya, during his career has published more than 700 songs performed by Gorky Park, Bravo, Prime-Minister, Alla Pugacheva, Philip Kirkorov, Nikolay Baskov, Valeriya, Dima Bilan and many others.

Artyom Kavaleryan, son of Karen Kavaleryan, is the lyricist of the Russian entry in the Junior Eurovision Song Contest 2005 "Doroga k solntsu" performed by Vlad Krutskikh.

== Eurovision Song Contest entries ==
Country	Year	Song	Artist	Place	Points	Composer
Russia	2002	"Northern Girl"†1	Prime Minister	10	55	Kim Breitburg
Russia	2006	"Never Let You Go"†2	Dima Bilan	2 (SF: 3rd)	248 (SF: 217)	Alexander Lunyov
Belarus	2007	"Work Your Magic"	Dmitry Koldun	6 (SF: 4th)	145 (SF: 176)	Philipp Kirkorov
Armenia	2007	"Anytime You Need"†3	Hayko	8 (SF: —)	138 (SF: —)	Hayko
Ukraine	2008	"Shady Lady"	Ani Lorak	2 (SF: 1)	230 (SF: 152)	Philipp Kirkorov
Georgia	2008	"Peace Will Come"	Diana Gurtskaya	11 (SF: 5)	83 (SF: 107)	Kim Breitburg
Armenia	2010	"Apricot Stone"	Eva Rivas	7 (SF:6)	141 (SF:83)	Armen Martirosyan
Ukraine	2013	"Gravity"	Zlata Ognevich	3 (SF:3)	214 (SF:140)	Mikhail Nekrasov

†1 Lyrics co-written with Evgene Fridlyand & Irina Antonyan
†2 Lyrics co-written with Irina Antonyan
†3 Lyrics co-written with Hayko (Armenian part)

=== National Finals entries ===
- 2005 Russia Alexandr Panaiotov & Alexey Chumakov, Balalayka and Russian version Balalayka
- 2005 Russia A-Sortie, Keep On Shinin' and Russian version Sharik
- 2006 Russia Dima Bilan, Lady Flame
- 2006 Russia Jasmin, Foreigner
- 2007 Belarus Diana Gurtskaya, How Long
- 2008 Russia Alexandr Panaiotov, Crescent & Cross
- 2008 Russia Anatoliy Alyoshin, One More Try
- 2012 Russia Mark Tishman, Money vs Love

== Personal life ==
He is married, has a son Artyom.
