= Make It Rain Champagne =

Single by Verka Serduchka

from the album Sexy
- Released: 13 December 2019
- Genre: Pop
- Length: 2:53
- Label: Mamamusic
- Songwriters: Andreas Öhrn; Peter Boström

Verka Serduchka singles chronology
"Hydropark" (2015)	"Make It Rain Champagne" (2019)

"Make It Rain Champagne" is a song by Ukrainian singer Verka Serduchka. It was released on 13 December 2019 by Mamamusic as the lead single from her EP Sexy (2020). The song was written by Andreas Öhrn and Peter Boström. It entered the top 10 of the Ukrainian radio chart Tophit.

== Live performances ==
Verka Serduchka performed the song for the first time on 26 December 2019 on the air of the program Evening of premieres with Katya Osadcha. Also live performances with the song took place on the program X-Factor and at the final of the National Selection for Eurovision.

== Awards and nominations ==
Year	Award	Category	Result	Ref.
2021	YUNA	Best song in a foreign language	Won	

== Charts ==
=== Weekly charts ===
Chart (2019–2020)	Peak position
CIS Airplay (TopHit)	98
Ukraine Airplay (TopHit)	5
Kyiv Airplay (Tophit)	16

=== Year-end charts ===
Chart (2020)	Position
Ukraine Airplay (Tophit)	104
Kyiv Airplay (Tophit)	181
