= Pirozhok (album) =

Single by Verka Serduchka

from the album Pirozhok
- Released: 2001
- Recorded: 1999–2001
- Genre: Pop, folk punk
- Songwriter(s): Andrey Danilko

Verka Serduchka singles chronology
"Pirozhok" (2001)	"Vera+Misha" (2001)

Pirozhok (Pie) is the name of maxi-single released by Verka Serduchka in 2001. The single contains 3 songs and piano versions of these songs. The music video was filmed for the song "Pirozhok".

The song "Pirozhok" was firstly sung at the "SV Show" in 1999. In 1999 the song come at the radio stations of Ukraine and Russia.

== Track listing ==
1. Люта бджілка (Angry bee)
2. Пирожок (Pie)
3. Ты уволен (You're fired)
4. Люта Бджілка (piano version)
5. Пирожок (piano version)
6. Ты уволен (piano version)
