= Chita Drita =

- Original cover

Studio album by Verka Serduchka
- Released: 2003
- Recorded: 2002–2004
- Venue: Kyiv, Ukraine
- Studio: Mamamusic Studio
- Genre: Pop
- Length: 48:38 (3rd edition)
- Language: Russian
- Label: Mamamusic
- Producer: Andrey Danilko; Gennady Krupnik; Iryna Bilyk; Yury Nikitin (exec)

Verka Serduchka chronology
Kha-ra-sho! (2003)	Chita Drita (2003)	Zhenikha khotela. Neizdannoye (2004)

Alternative cover
- 2004 re-release cover

Singles from Chita Drita
- 1. "Chita-drita" Released: 2003; 2. "Gulyanka" Released: 2003; 3. "Novogodnyaya" Released: 9 December 2003; 4. "Tuk, tuk, tuk" Released: 21 October 2004; 5. "Yolki" Released: 13 December 2004; 6. "Ya popala na lyubov" Released: 12 January 2005

Professional ratings
Review scores
Source	Rating
Miamusic	9/10

Chita Drita (Russian: Чита Дрита) is the second studio album by Ukrainian singer Verka Serduchka released in 2003 by Mamamusic.

== Overview ==
Unlike the previous album, this album was written as a cohesive work. A team of authors led by Andrey Danilko, who wrote both words and music. Ukrainian songwriter Arkady Gartsman and composer Gennady Krupnik were also involved in the work on the album. The author of two songs on the album was Konstanin Gnatenko. Recording took place at Mamamusic Studio in Kyiv, and mastering took place in Moscow.

The song "Ty - na sever, ya - na yug" was recorded with Ukrainian singer Iryna Bilyk, it was the first song in Russian in her discography. Next year it will be included on her first Russian-language album Lyubov. Yad. Iryna Bilyk is also the author of music and lyrics.

The album features the bonus song "Mne tak nuzhna lyubov tvoya", which is designated as performed by Andrey Danilko. "For dessert" there is a remix of the song "Ya rozhdena dlya lyubvi".

== Singles ==
Six singles were released from the album for radio rotation. "Chita-drita" was released before the album release. The third single "Novogodnyaya" was released with the first reissue of the album. It became the leader of the radio airwaves, taking first place in the weekly CIS rating, and took second place in the annual one. The song "Yolki" reached the top ten of the charts in the CIS and Ukraine. "Ya popala na lyubov" reached number 62 on the CIS chart.

Semyon Gorov shot music videos for songs "Chita-drita", "Tuk, tuk, tuk", "Ya popala na lyubov".

== Editions ==
The album was released in 2003. The cover featured Verka Serduchka wearing floral wreath and fur coat with a dove in her hand against the background of a blooming field. In the same year on the Eve of the New Year, the album was reissued with a new song "Novogodnyaya", the design of the album also changed: this time Verka stood in a snowdrift with the night sky in the background. In 2004 the album was reissued again and again with a new song "Yolki", this time Verka stood against the background of the Northern lights.

== Awards and nominations ==
In 2005 the album won the Record Awards in the category "Album of the year by an artist from near abroad". For the song "Tuk, tuk, tuk" Verka Serduchka received the Golden Gramophone.

== Track listing ==
Chita Drita – 3rd edition
No.	Title	Lyrics	Music	Producer(s)	Length
1.	"Yolki"	Lyubasha	Lyubasha	Andrey Danilko; Gennady Krupnik	3:14
2.	"Novogodnyaya"	Arkady Gartsman	Danilko; Krupnik	Danilko; Krupnik	2:27
3.	"Chita-drita"	Danilko	Danilko	Danilko; Krupnik	2:44
4.	"Gulyanka"	Gartsman	Danilko	Danilko; Krupnik	2:55
5.	"Tuk, tuk, tuk"	Danilko; Gartsman	Danilko	Danilko; Krupnik	3:46
6.	"Ty ushyol..."	Konstantin Gnatenko	Gnatenko	Danilko; Krupnik	3:52
7.	"Poyezd "Kiyev-Odessa""	Gnatenko	Gnatenko	Danilko; Krupnik	3:48
8.	"Polosa (Optimisticheskaya)"	Danilko	Danilko	Danilko; Krupnik	3:03
9.	"Ya popala na lyubov"	Danilko	Danilko	Danilko; Krupnik	4:02
10.	"Ty - na sever, ya - na yug" (duet with Iryna Bilyk)	Bilyk	Bilyk	Bilyk; Danilko; Krupnik	3:13
11.	"Vsem nado"	Danilko; Vitaly Kurovsky	Danilko; Krupnik	Danilko; Krupnik	3:43
12.	"My festivalim"	Danilko; Gartsman	Danilko	Danilko; Krupnik	3:39

Bonus
No.	Title	Lyrics	Music	Producer(s)	Length
13.	"Mne tak nuzhna lyubov tvoya" (Andrey Danilko)	Danilko	Danilko	Danilko; Krupnik	3:10

For dessert
No.	Title	Lyrics	Music	Producer(s)	Length
14.	"Ya rozhdena dlya lyubvi" (2003)	Danilko	Danilko	Danilko; Krupnik	4:56
Total length:					48:38

== Personnel ==
Musicians

- Andrey Danilko – lead vocals (all tracks), songwriting (2–9, 11–14), production (all tracks)
- Arkady Gartsman – songwriting (2, 4, 5, 12)
- Konstantin Gnatenko – songwriting (6, 7)
- Iryna Bilyk – lead vocals (10), songwriting (10), production (10)
- Vitaly Kurovsky – songwriting (11)
- Lyubasha – songwriting (1)
- Gennady Krupnik – songwriting (2, 11), production (all tracks), background vocals (2, 4–8, 10, 13–14), keyboards, guitar (7–9, 11, 12, 14)
- Natalia Rebrik – background vocals (3, 4, 8)
- Anna Gonchar — background vocals (3, 4, 8)
- Natalia Gura – background vocals (2, 5, 7, 12, 14)
- Sergey Dobrovolsky – guitar (6, 10, 13)
- Vladimir Kopota – trumpet (3, 4)

Technical

- Sergey Dobrovolsky – recording (all tracks), mixing (all tracks)

Studios

- Mamamusic Studio (2003, 2004, Kyiv, Ukraine) – recording (all tracks)
- SBI (2003, 2004, Moscow, Russia) – mastering (all tracks)

Management and marketing

- Yury Nikitin / Nova Management – management, executive production
- Tatyana Krupnik – project management
- Andrey Petrov – photography
- Alexey Patekhin – design
- Andrey Danilko – style

== Charts ==
Singles
Year	Title	Peak chart positions	
Year	Title	RUS/CIS Tophit	Moscow Tophit
2003	"Chita-drita"	—	—
2003	"Gulyanka"	—	—
2003	"Novogodnyaya"	1	72
2004	"Tuk, tuk, tuk"	92	27
2004	"Yolki"	9	—
2005	"Ya popala na lyubov"	62	—
"—" denotes a recording that did not chart.

== Release history ==
Region	Date	Format(s)	Edition(s)	Length	Label
Ukraine Russia	2003	CD; cassette tape	Original edition	43:04	Mamamusic; Grammofon Rekords
Ukraine Russia	November 2003	CD; cassette tape	2nd edition (+ "Novogodnyaya")	45:27	Mamamusic; Grammofon Rekords
Ukraine Russia	2004	CD; cassette tape	3rd edition (+ "Yolki")	48:38	Mamamusic; Astra
Various	2013	Digital download; streaming	3rd edition (+ "Yolki")	48:28	Mamamusic
Various	2014	Digital download; streaming	Original edition	42:52	Mamamusic
