= Kha-ra-sho! =

Studio album by Verka Serduchka
- Released: 2003
- Recorded: 1998–2003
- Venue: Kyiv, Ukraine
- Studio: Mamamusic Studio (1998–2003); Muzykalnaya birzha (1999–2002)
- Genre: Pop; folk; schlager
- Length: 59:23
- Language: Russian; Ukrainian; Surzhyk
- Label: Mamamusic
- Producer: Andriy Danylko; Yurii Nikitin (exec)

Verka Serduchka chronology
Neizdannoye (2002)	Kha-ra-sho! (2003)	Chita Drita (2003)

Professional ratings
Review scores
Source	Rating
Miamusic	8/10
Ogoniok	unrated

Kha-ra-sho! (Russian: Ха-ра-шо!; transl. Good) is the debut studio album by Ukrainian singer Verka Serduchka released in 2003 by Mamamusic.

The record became one of the most popular releases at that time in post-Soviet states. It sold 500,000 copies and even received a diamond certification in Ukraine. In 2004, the album won in the category "Album of the year" at the Muz-TV Music Awards, for the songs "Hop-Hop" and "Ya ne ponyala" Serdyuchka received the Golden Gramophones.

== Track listing ==
Kha-ra-sho! – Re-release
No.	Title	Writer(s)	Producer(s)	Length
1.	"Abrikosy" (First version)	Andriy Danylko	Danylko	4:15
2.	"Vsyo budet khorosho"	Danylko	Danylko	3:54
3.	"A ya tolko s moroza"	Danylko	Danylko	3:46
4.	"Horilka"	Danylko; Konstantin Meladze	Danylko; Meladze	2:53
5.	"Hop-Hop"	Danylko	Danylko	3:14
6.	"Lyuta bdzhilka"	Danylko	Danylko	3:53
7.	"Pirozhok"	Danylko	Danylko	3:42
8.	"Ya rozhdena dlya lyubvi"	Danylko	Danylko	5:26
9.	"Devochki"	Danylko	Danylko	5:06
10.	"Ya ne ponyala"	Danylko; Meladze	Danylko; Meladze	3:48
11.	"Ty uvolen"	Danylko	Danylko	4:54
12.	"A metel metyot belaya..."	Danylko	Danylko	4:44
13.	"A ya u hay khodyla..."	Danylko	Danylko	2:27

For dessert
No.	Title	Writer(s)	Producer(s)	Length
14.	"Kontrolyor"	Arkady Gartsman; Danylko	Danylko	3:42
15.	"Po chut-chut"	Danylko	Danylko	4:23
Total length:				59:23

== Sales and certifications ==
Region	Certification	Certified units/sales
Ukraine (IFPI)	Diamond	500,000
