= 15 (Ani Lorak album) =

Studio album by Ani Lorak
- Released: 2007
- Recorded: 2006–2007
- Genres: Pop, pop-rock, R'n'B
- Languages: Russian, English
- Label: Lavina Music

Ani Lorak chronology
Розкажи... (2006)	15 (2007)	Shady Lady (2008)

15 is the tenth album by Ukrainian singer-songwriter Ani Lorak, released by Lavina Music.

== Track listing ==
No.	Title	Translation	Length
1.	"С первого взгляда" (S pervogo vzglyada)	From the First Glance
2.	"Семь ветров" (Sem' vetrov)	Seven Winds
3.	"Укради" (Ukradi)	Steal
4.	"Искала" (Iskala)	I Was Searching
5.	"Я не буду твоей" (Ya ne budu tvoey)	I Won't Be Yours
6.	"Спроси" (Sprosi)	Ask
7.	"Верни назад мою любовь" (Verni nazad moyu lyubov' – duet with Valery Meladze)	Give Me Back My Love
8.	"Я с тобой" (Ya s toboy)	I'm With You
9.	"Жду тебя" (Zhdu tebya)	Waiting For You
10.	"It's My Life (Live)" (Bon Jovi cover)
11.	"Я стану морем"	I Will Become the Sea
12.	"Верни назад мою любовь (Remix)"
13.	"С первого взгляда (Remix)"

== DVD Track listing ==
1. С первого взгляда
2. Я с тобой
