= Sexy (EP) =

EP by Verka Serduchka
- Released: 4 September 2020
- Recorded: 2019–2020
- Venue: Stockholm, Sweden
- Genre: Pop music
- Label: Mamamusic
- Producer: Yurii Nikitin (exec)

Verka Serduchka chronology
Doremi Doredo (2008)	Sexy (2020)

Singles from Sexy
- 1. "Make It Rain Champagne" Released: 13 December 2019

Professional ratings
Review scores
Source	Rating
InterMedia	7/10
Wiwibloggs	unrated

Sexy is an EP by Ukrainian pop singer Verka Serduchka. The album was released on 4 September 2020 by Mamamusic.

== Background and release ==
The EP was first announced in February 2020. Andrey Danilko admitted in an interview that he doesn't have enough English-language songs at the concerts that he arrange specifically for Eurovision, so it was decided to release an extended play with songs in English. Previously, in December 2019, the single "Make It Rain Champagne" was released to gauge fans' reaction to the English-language song.

The EP was planned to be released in March–April 2020 ahead of the Eurovision Song Contest 2020. However, due to the COVID-19 pandemic, the release was postponed. On 1 September, Verka announced on her Instagram that the EP would be released on 4 September.

The album was recorded in Sweden and produced by Andreas Öhrn, Cris Wahle and Peter Boström.

== Track listing ==
No.	Title	Writer(s)	Length
1.	"Swedish Lullaby"	Andreas Öhrn, Chris Wahle, Peter Boström	3:15
2.	"Sexy"	Andreas Öhrn, Peter Boström	3:19
3.	"Disco Kicks"	Andreas Öhrn, Peter Boström	3:06
4.	"Make It Rain Champagne"	Andreas Öhrn, Peter Boström	2:53
Total length:			12:35
