= Dancing Lasha Tumbai =

2007 song by Verka Serduchka

Single by Verka Serduchka

from the album Dancing Europe
- Released: 2007
- Recorded: 2007
- Genre: Eurodance; pop-folk
- Length: 3:01
- Label: EMI
- Songwriter: Andriy Danylko

Verka Serduchka singles chronology
"Beri vsyo" (2006)	"Dancing Lasha Tumbai" (2007)	"Hop Hop" (2007)

Music video
- "Dancing Lasha Tumbai" on YouTube

Eurovision Song Contest 2007 entry
- Country: Ukraine
- Artist: Andriy Danylko
- As: Verka Serduchka
- Languages: Ukrainian; German; English; Russian
- Composer: Andriy Danylko
- Lyricist: Andriy Danylko

Finals performance
- Final result: 2nd
- Final points: 235

Entry chronology
- ◄ "Show Me Your Love" (2006)
- "Shady Lady" (2008) ►

Official performance video
- "Dancing Lasha Tumbai" (final) on YouTube

"Dancing Lasha Tumbai" (Ukrainian: Денсінґ Лаша Тумбай) is a song written by Ukrainian comedian Andriy Danylko and recorded by him in his drag persona Verka Serduchka. It represented Ukraine in the Eurovision Song Contest 2007, held in Helsinki.

The original title was simply "Danzing", but it was changed due to a controversy about the lyrics. The song includes lyrics in four languages: German, English, Russian, and Ukrainian.

== Background ==
=== Conception ===
Ukrainian comedian Andriy Danylko wrote the song as "Danzing" and recorded it in his drag persona Verka Serduchka.

=== Eurovision ===
On 29 March 2007, "Danzing" performed by Verka Serduchka competed in Evrobachennya 2007 – Natsionalyni vidbir, the Ukrainian national final organized by the National Television Company of Ukraine (NTU) to select their song and performer for the 52nd edition of the Eurovision Song Contest. The song won the competition so it became the Ukrainian entry for the contest. For the song to participate in the contest, it was retitled as "Dancing Lasha Tumbai".

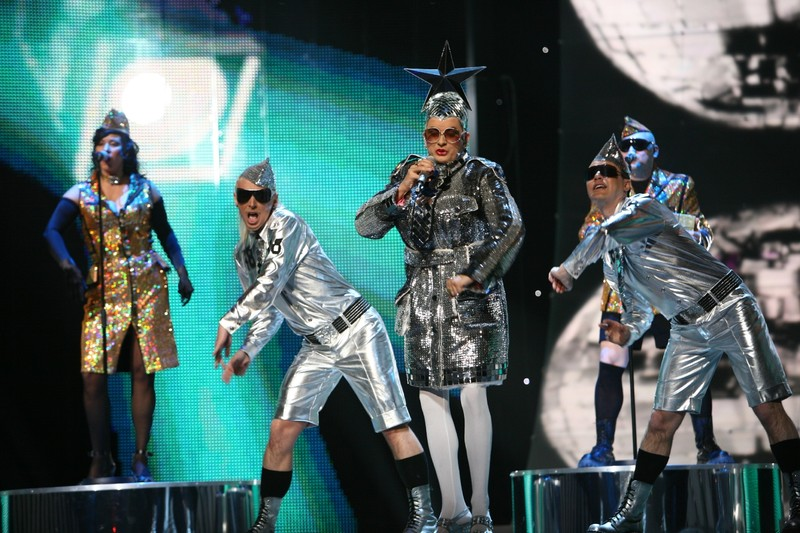
"Dancing Lasha Tumbai" performed at the Eurovision Song Contest

On 12 May 2007, the Eurovision Song Contest grand final was held at the Hartwall Areena in Helsinki hosted by Yleisradio (YLE), and broadcast live throughout the continent. Serduchka performed "Dancing Lasha Tumbai" eighteenth on the night following Serbia's "Molitva" by Marija Šerifović and preceding United Kingdom's "Flying the Flag (For You)" by Scooch. In the performance, Serduchka was accompanied by three backing singers dressed in gold and two dancers dressed in silver. Serduchka dressed in silver wore the number "69" on her back, with reference to the sexual position. The two dancers wore the number "18", referring to the entry's running order.

At the close of voting, "Dancing Lasha Tumbai" received 235 points, finished runner-up to Serbia's "Molitva" by Marija Šerifović.

=== Aftermath ===
The song became a major chart hit not only in Ukraine and neighboring countries, but throughout the rest of Europe as well.

In the Eurovision Song Contest 2019 in Tel Aviv, Serduchka performed as part of the "Switch Song" interval act, along with 2014 winner Conchita Wurst, 2015 winner Måns Zelmerlöw, and 2018 runner-up Eleni Foureira. The latter performed a version of "Dancing Lasha Tumbai" where she wore an almost-naked bodysuit with 250,000 crystals designed by Vrettos Vrettakοs, before Verka covered then-incumbent winner "Toy" by Netta.

Serduchka performed her song again at the Eurovision Song Contest 2023 Grand Final flag parade.

== Controversies ==
The choice of a drag performer as Ukraine's representative for Eurovision was fiercely criticized by several media and politicians of different parties in the country. Taras Chornovil of Party of Regions was quoted saying:

I guess some of our esteemed experts saw those "hot Finnish guys" dressed as monsters but didn't quite understand that there is subculture and there is pseudoculture. Those monsters are part of their subculture, which has the right to exist. But all these hermaphrodites have never been accepted anywhere. Therefore I think that this will be a serious embarrassment factor and the world will see us as complete idiots.

Another subject of controversy was the song's title and lyrics. According to Danylko, the phrase Lasha tumbai is a Mongolian phrase for "whipped cream", "milkshake", or "churned butter". It was later alleged, though, that there are no such words in Mongolian and the catchphrase bears no meaning at all. There have been allegations that the words were chosen due to their phonetic resemblance to "Russia Goodbye", allegedly a reference to the 2004–2005 Orange Revolution. The song also contains a Russian-language phrase (танцевать хорошо). Serduchka, however, had the full support of the NTU, and the participation in the contest in Helsinki went ahead as planned. At the Embrace Ukraine fundraiser, following the 2022 Russian invasion of Ukraine, Serduchka performed the song with the lyrics "I want to say Russia goodbye" and changed the song's title to "Dancing Russia Goodbye".

== Legacy ==
=== In popular culture ===
Danylko had a cameo as Serduchka in the 2015 film Spy, where he can be seen performing the song during a chase sequence involving lead actress Melissa McCarthy.

In 2020, the song was featured in the episode "Are You from Pinner?" of the BBC thriller series Killing Eve.

== Charts ==
Professional ratings
Review scores
Source	Rating
Findance.com	8/10 stars

Chart (2007)	Peak position
Austria (Ö3 Austria Top 40)	49
Belgium (Ultratip Bubbling Under Flanders)	14
CIS Airplay (TopHit)	110
European Hot 100 Singles (Billboard)	22
Finland (Suomen virallinen lista)	2
France (SNEP)	6
Germany (GfK)	74
Ireland (IRMA)	31
Sweden (Sverigetopplistan)	6
Switzerland (Schweizer Hitparade)	53
UK Singles (Official Charts)	28

== Track listing ==
=== CD single ===
- All tracks are variations on the title track.

No.	Title	Length
1.	"Original Version"	3:10
2.	"Dancing Version #1"	3:32
3.	"Pub Version Art"	3:12
4.	"Dancing Version #2"	3:01
5.	"Club Version"	5:52
6.	"Long Version With Balalaika"	3:32
7.	"Lullaby"	2:56
8.	"Basshunter Remix"	3:08
