= Arkady Gartsman =

Ukrainian songwriter, screenwriter and actor (1947–2022)

- Аркадій Гарцман
- Born: Arkady Semyonovich Gartsman; 1 May 1947; Kyiv, Ukrainian SSR, USSR
- Died: 23 June 2022 (aged 75); Kyiv, Ukraine
- Other names: Arkadiy Gartsman
- Occupation(s): songwriter, screenwriter and actor

Arkady Semyonovich Gartsman (Ukrainian: Аркадій Семенович Гарцман; 1 May 1947 – 23 June 2022) was a Ukrainian songwriter, screenwriter and actor.

== Life and career ==
Born in Kyiv, before entering the entertainment industry, Gartsman worked as a mechanic in a factory and as an engineer in a bus depot.

His career started when some compositions he had sent to director David Cherkassky were eventually chosen to be part of the film Treasure Island. Gartsman later composed songs for prominent artists such as Sofia Rotaru, Alla Pugacheva, Verka Serduchka, Nikolai Karachentsov, Taisia Povaliy and Maxim Galkin.

Gartsman was also active as an actor and a screenwriter in cinema and on television, having some significant success playing the lead in the series Liquidation. In 1990, he co-founded the comic newspaper Blin, that he also directed until 1998. He died on 23 June 2022, aged 75 years old.
