= Diana Gurtskaya =

Diana Gurtskaya Диана Гурцкая
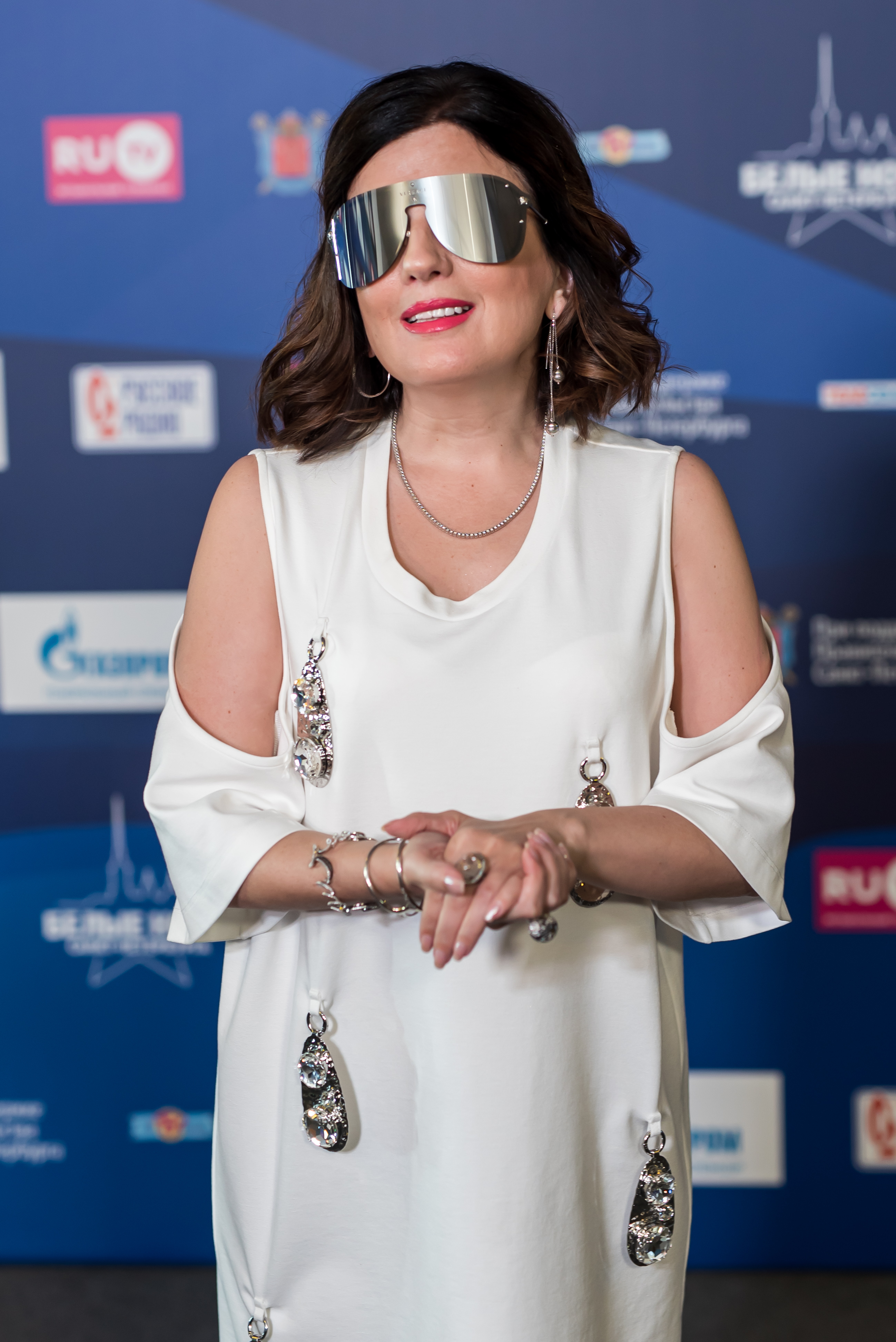
- Gurtskaya in 2021

Background information
- Born: Diana Gudaevna Gurtskaya; 2 July 1978 (age 48); Sukhumi, Abkhaz ASSR, Georgian SSR, USSR
- Genres: Pop, synthpop, pop rock
- Occupations: Singer, songwriter
- Years active: 2000–present
- Spouse: Petr Kucherenko (m. 2005; died 2023)

Diana Gudaevna Gurtskaya (Georgian: დიანა ღურწკაია, Russian: Диана Гудаевна Гурцкая, born 2 July 1978) is a Georgian-born Abkhaz singer based in Russia.

== Early life ==
Diana Gurtskaya was born on July 2, 1978, in Abkhazia (ex-Soviet Georgia). She has been affected by visual impairment from the day she was born. Following the dissolution of the Soviet Union and the ensuing conflict in Abkhazia in the early 1990s, her family was forced to live in a refugee camp, which eventually led them to migrate to Russia.

== Career ==
In 1995, Gurtskaya won an international junior song contest, leading her to become popular in Russia, Ukraine, Georgia, Israel and countries with substantial Russian-speaking minorities. Gurtskaya then signed with a major Russian music label, and released a series of hit singles with a record-breaking number of copies sold.

She has recorded duets with various well-known foreign singers including Ray Charles, Toto Cutugno, and Demis Roussos.

In 2006, President Vladimir Putin presented Diana with "The Honored Artist of Russia" award – one of the highest state prizes in the Russian entertainment industry. In an online voting on March 1, 2008, residents of Georgia voted for Gurtskaya to represent Georgia in the Eurovision Song Contest 2008 in Belgrade. she competed with 12 finalists from Georgia and won, after her performance of the song "Peace Will Come".

In 2009, on the International Paralympic Day, held for the first time in Moscow, the Organizing Committee of the Sochi 2014 Olympic Games awarded Diana Gurtskaya the status of Sochi 2014 Ambassador as a person who promotes the ideas of the Olympic and Paralympic movement in Russia and the world.

Gurtskaya is a member of the Public Council under Chairman of the Federation Council of the Federal Assembly of the Russian Federation. Since 2011 Diana has served as a member of the Public Chamber of the Russian Federation, Chairman of the Commission for Improving Accessible Environment and Inclusive practices. In 2013, Gurtskaya was appointed a member of the Commission under the President of the Russian Federation for Disabled People.

In 2005, Gurtskaya married Pyotr Kucherenko, a professor of law at the Peoples' Friendship University of Russia. In June 2007, she gave birth to a baby son, Constantine. Pyotr Kucherenko died in 2023.

In 2018 Gurtskaya launched the "Centre for Social Integration" for people with disabilities under the department of labor and social protection of the population of Moscow. This project aims to help people with disabilities better integrate into the society through various forms of art (vocal, theatrical and computer design) using inclusive methods.

In 2022, she was named "People's Artist of the Russian Federation".

== Discography ==
=== Studio albums ===
- Ty zdess (2000)
- Ty Znayesh mama (2002)
- Utro (2003)
- Nezhnaya (2004)
- 9 Mesjacev (2007)
- Ja Ljublju vas vseh (2009)

=== Compilation albums ===
- MP3 Collection (2006)
- Novoye i luchshyeye (2009)

== Filmography ==
Year	Film	Role	Notes
2007	9 months	singing voice	She performed the theme song

Awards and achievements
Preceded by Sopho with "Visionary Dream"	Georgia in the Eurovision Song Contest; 2008	Succeeded by Sofia Nizharadze with "Shine"
