= Verka Serduchka =

Ukrainian entertainer (born 1973)

Verka Serduchka Вєрка Сердючка
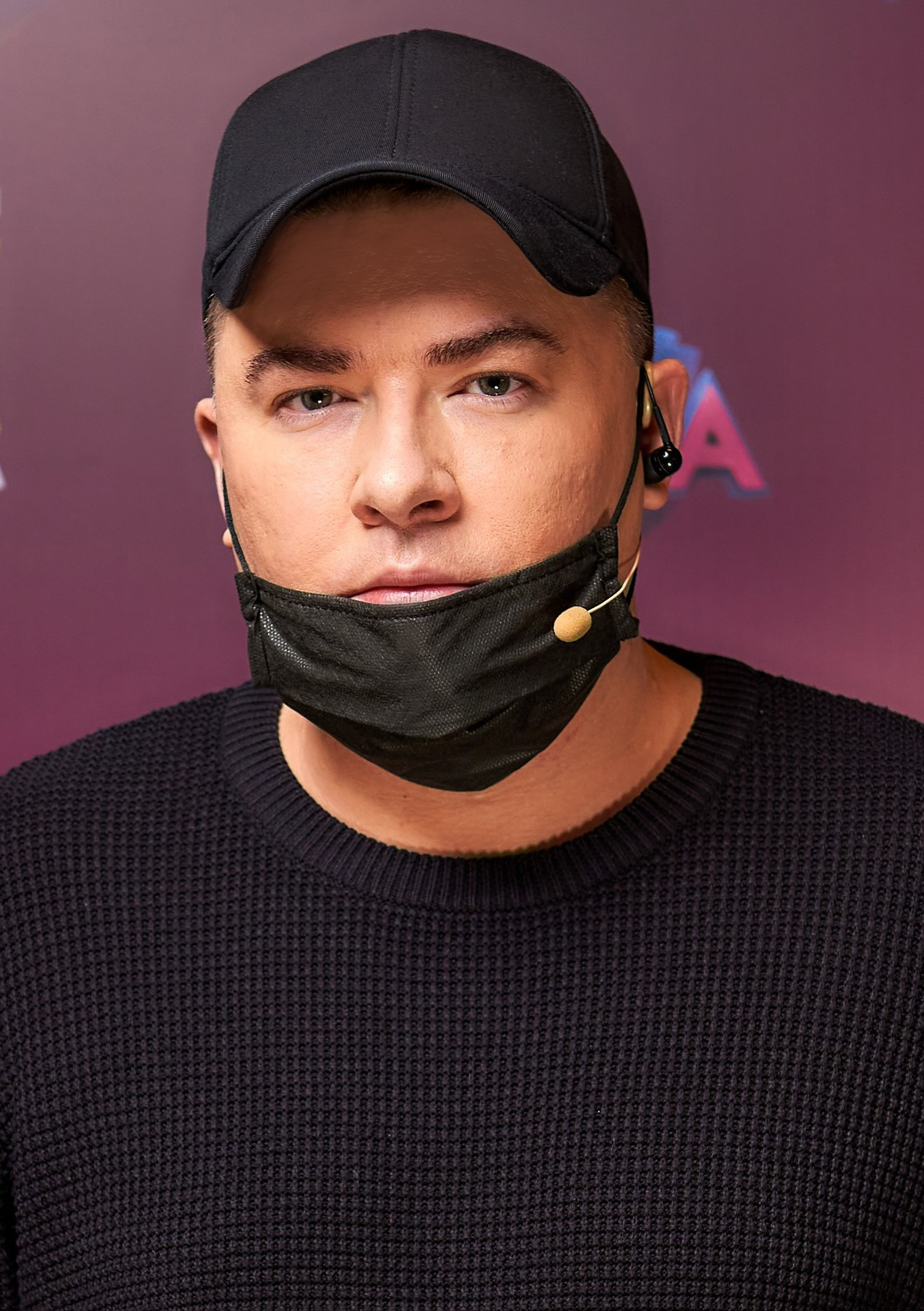
- Danylko in 2021

Background information
- Also known as: Vierka Serdiuchka; Serduchka
- Born: Andriy Mykhailovych Danylko (Андрій Михайлович Данилко); 2 October 1973 (age 53); Poltava, Ukrainian SSR, Soviet Union (now Ukraine)
- Genres: Comedy; parody; novelty; ska; folk-pop
- Occupations: Comedian; actor; singer
- Instruments: Vocals, piano
- Years active: 1998–present
- Label: mamamusic
- Website: serduchka.com

Andriy Mykhailovych Danylko (Note: Also transliterated as Andrii by the national standard) (Ukrainian: Андрій Михайлович Данилко; born 2 October 1973), better known as his drag persona Verka Serduchka (Ukrainian: Вєрка Сердючка, romanized: Vierka Serdiuchka, IPA: [ˈwʲɛrkɐ serˈdʲutʃkɐ]; Russian: Верка Сердючка, romanized: Verka Serdyuchka, IPA: [ˈvʲerkə sʲɪrˈdʲʉtɕkə]), is a Ukrainian comedian, actor, and singer. He represented Ukraine in the Eurovision Song Contest 2007 as Verka with the song "Dancing Lasha Tumbai", finishing in second place. He has sold over 600,000 records. He has appeared in films, most notably a cameo as Verka in the American comedy film Spy (2015).

== Early life ==
Andriy Mykhailovych Danylko was born to a working-class family in Poltava on 2 October 1973. His mother, Svitlana Volkova, came from the noble Khomentovsky family, who were friends with the artist Ilya Repin. In 1980, at the age of seven, he lost his father to lung cancer. Since childhood, he had a talent for drawing and music, and he entered art school in 1984. His talents were manifested in other areas as well; he was the captain of the KVN school team, played as a schoolboy for the CPTU No. 30 team, and performed annually on the stage in the summer children's camp. In addition, he became interested in theater and entered the local theater studio in the seventh grade, where he was engaged in a studio called Grotesque and was part of the theater group Compote. In 1991, he graduated from Poltava Secondary School No. 27, and later graduated from the Kyiv State College of Circus and Variety Arts.

== Career ==
=== Early career ===
In 1990, Danylko began to create the character of Verka Serduchka, a flamboyant middle-aged woman from a rural family, working as a railroad sleeping car attendant. He presented Serduchka publicly for the first time in a Poltava comedy competition on 4 January 1991. He invented the character's name by combining the randomly picked first name Verka and the last name of a former school classmate, Anna Serduk. Danylko later gave his Serduchka character a "mother," played by actress Inna Bilokin, who had been Danylko's close friend since school.

In 1995 Verka Serduchka debuted on Ukrainian television in an advertisement for PrivatBank. Danylko's persona achieved great popularity, and soon he started touring Ukraine and even took part in concerts organized by the Ukrainian government.

In the late 1990s and early 2000s, Danylko hosted a talk show called "SV-show" ("SV" is an abbreviation for Ukrainian: Спальний Вагон, "Spalnyy Vagon", which means sleeping car), which debuted on 1+1 and was later broadcast on various Ukrainian television channels. In 2001, Danylko made his first appearance in one of several musicals produced for television, mostly in female comic portrayals based on the Serduchka character (see Filmography). Several of these productions were shown in the New Year's Eve broadcasts of Russia-1 television.

After Verka Serduchka, Danylko created other characters, such as a police officer, a soldier, and a female ballet dancer. He established a troupe called the Danylko Theater to tour Ukraine and Russia. In 2002, Danylko, along with his group, toured in the CIS and Baltic countries with the program "I Am a Revolution" for the whole year. The following year he was awarded the title of Honored Artist of Ukraine soon after the Danylko Theater concert tour "I Was Born for Love".

Apart from pop and dance performances as Serduchka, Danylko has also performed ambient musical compositions under his real name, including the 2005 album После тебя (Posle tebya: After you).

=== Eurovision Song Contest 2007 ===
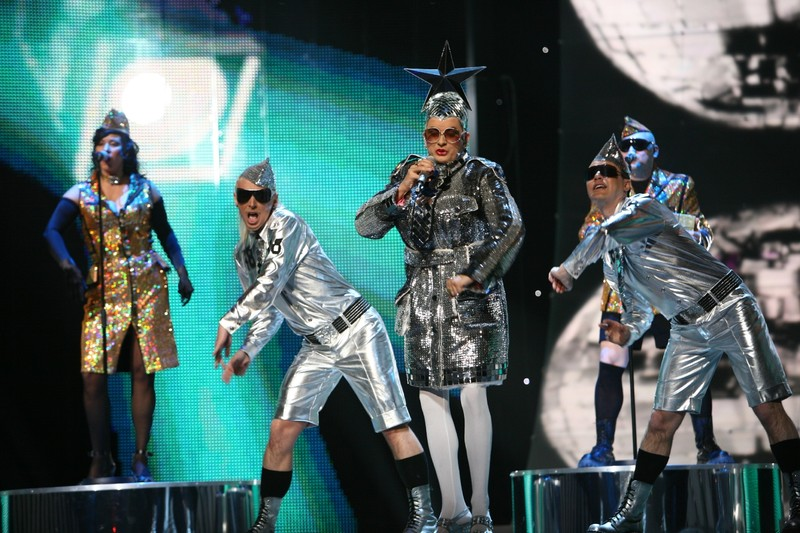
Verka Serduchka with her ensemble in the Eurovision Song Contest 2007

The National Television Company of Ukraine (NTU) –through a national final– selected Verka Serduchka to represent Ukraine at the Eurovision Song Contest 2007, with the song "Dancing Lasha Tumbai".

Serduchka's song "Dancing Lasha Tumbai" was sung in two languages: German and English. In the final, "Dancing Lasha Tumbai" came in second with 235 points. The single reached No. 6 in the French charts and went on to be No. 28 on The Official UK Singles Chart on 20 May 2007. This was the first time a non-UK, non-winning Eurovision entry had made UK charts since 1974.

In 2011, a writer from British newspaper The Guardian described "Dancing Lasha Tumbai" as the "best song never to win Eurovision" before going on to describe Serduchka as "an oven-ready Christopher Biggins".

=== Later career ===
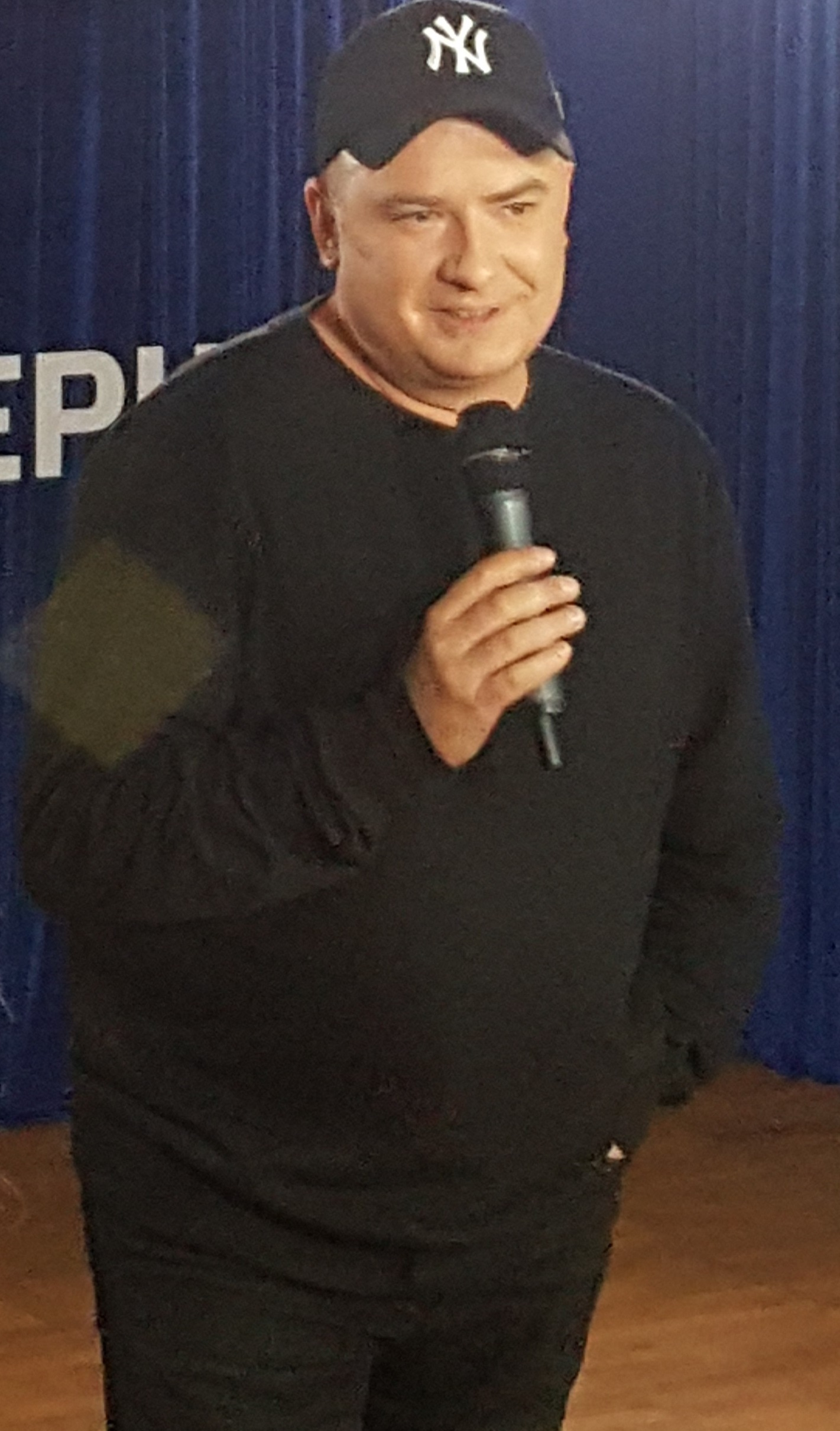
Danylko out of drag in 2018

Danylko announced in 2007 that he would front a new political party, "For Ours!", to run in that year's Ukrainian parliamentary election, but he later abandoned the idea. A public opinion poll in July 2007 placed "For Ours! Verka Serduchka" at 2% overall support. Serduchka had planned to participate in the Ukrainian national selection for the Eurovision Song Contest 2011. He automatically qualified for the final, but withdrew his nomination in October 2010.

In January 2013, Andriy Danylko bought a 1974 Rolls-Royce, once owned by Freddie Mercury, at the Autosport International Show in Birmingham with the intention of donating it to a museum. This idea fell through over the years because there was no suitable museum on the subject in Ukraine. The deal was made over the phone and he paid £75,000 for the car.

Danylko appeared as the character Verka Serduchka in a cameo role in the 2015 American action comedy movie Spy, which premiered 22 May 2015 in New York City and 4 June 2015 in Ukraine. In the scene, set in Paris, Serduchka's open-air performance of "Dancing Lasha Tumbai" is interrupted by CIA agents Susan Cooper (Melissa McCarthy) and Rick Ford (Jason Statham).

Since 2016, Andriy has been a constant judge at Vidbir, Ukraine's National Selection for the Eurovision Song Contest. In the Eurovision Song Contest 2016, Serduchka announced the results from the Ukrainian jury. Bilokon, portraying Serduchka's mother, accompanied Danylko.

From 2016 to 2019, he was member of the jury on the talent show X-Factor on STB.

For the Eurovision Song Contest 2017 hosted in Ukraine, a series of short video clips, titled "Verkavision", were produced that chronicled the fictional back story of the character of Verka Serduchka and her journey as a Eurovision "star". Verka also appeared on stage during the final, and opened the televote.

In May 2017, Andriy Danylko announced that he had decided to "bury" Verka Serduchka's stage image. The actor stated that he no longer wants to perform on the big stage in such a role. Despite this, Andriy continued his active concert activity.

On 28 June 2017, on the Constitution Day of Ukraine, he gave a big free solo concert in Kyiv, as part of the Atlas weekend festival. The event gathered a record number of spectators – more than 100 thousand people came to the square in front of the stage.

On 18 May 2019, Verka appeared in the Eurovision Song Contest 2019 final hosted in Tel Aviv, Israel, singing the previous year's winning song, "Toy" by Netta Barzilai, as part of the "Switch Song" interval act.

In 2020, Verka released the EP Sexy. The authors and producers of the album were Swedish producers Andreas Öhrn, Cris Wahle and Peter Boström (Bassflow).

In 2021, he became a judge on Mask, the Ukrainian adaptation of The Masked Singer. Also in 2021, as Verka Serduchka, he hosted an anniversary episode of the travel show Oryol i Reshka with Vera Brezhneva.

In March 2022, after Russia invaded Ukraine, Danylko repeatedly condemned Vladimir Putin's actions on Instagram and many interviews. During the Kyiv offensive, he refused to leave Kyiv, where he lives.

On 10 June 2022, he gave a concert as Verka for Ukrainian soldiers in Kyiv metro.

On 21 June 2022, he performed as Verka at the international charity TV marathon "Embrace Ukraine – #StrivingTogether", arranged in support of Ukraine with the participation of former Eurovision winners. The event took place at the Museum Square in Amsterdam with an objective to raise funds for purchasing medical equipment for health care facilities that assist wounded and injured people during the war in Ukraine.

In the fall of 2022, he put his previously purchased Rolls-Royce Silver Shadow 1974, which belonged to Freddie Mercury, up for the Sotheby’s auction to help support the construction of a modern rehabilitation and prosthesis center in Ukraine. On 5 November 2022, the car was auctioned off by WhiteBIT CEO and co-founder Volodymyr Nozov for £250,000 (11 million hryvnias). The auction house waived the usual fees, so the buyer's premium of £36,250 also went to the Superhumans Center project – a total of £286,250.

On 13 May 2023, Verka performed "Dancing Lasha Tumbai" during the flag parade of the Eurovision Song Contest 2023 final in Liverpool, United Kingdom.

On 16 May 2026, Verka performed "Puppet on a String" and "Nel blu, dipinto di blu" as part of an intermission act celebrating 70 years of the Eurovision Song Contest during the final of the Eurovision Song Contest 2026.

== Image ==
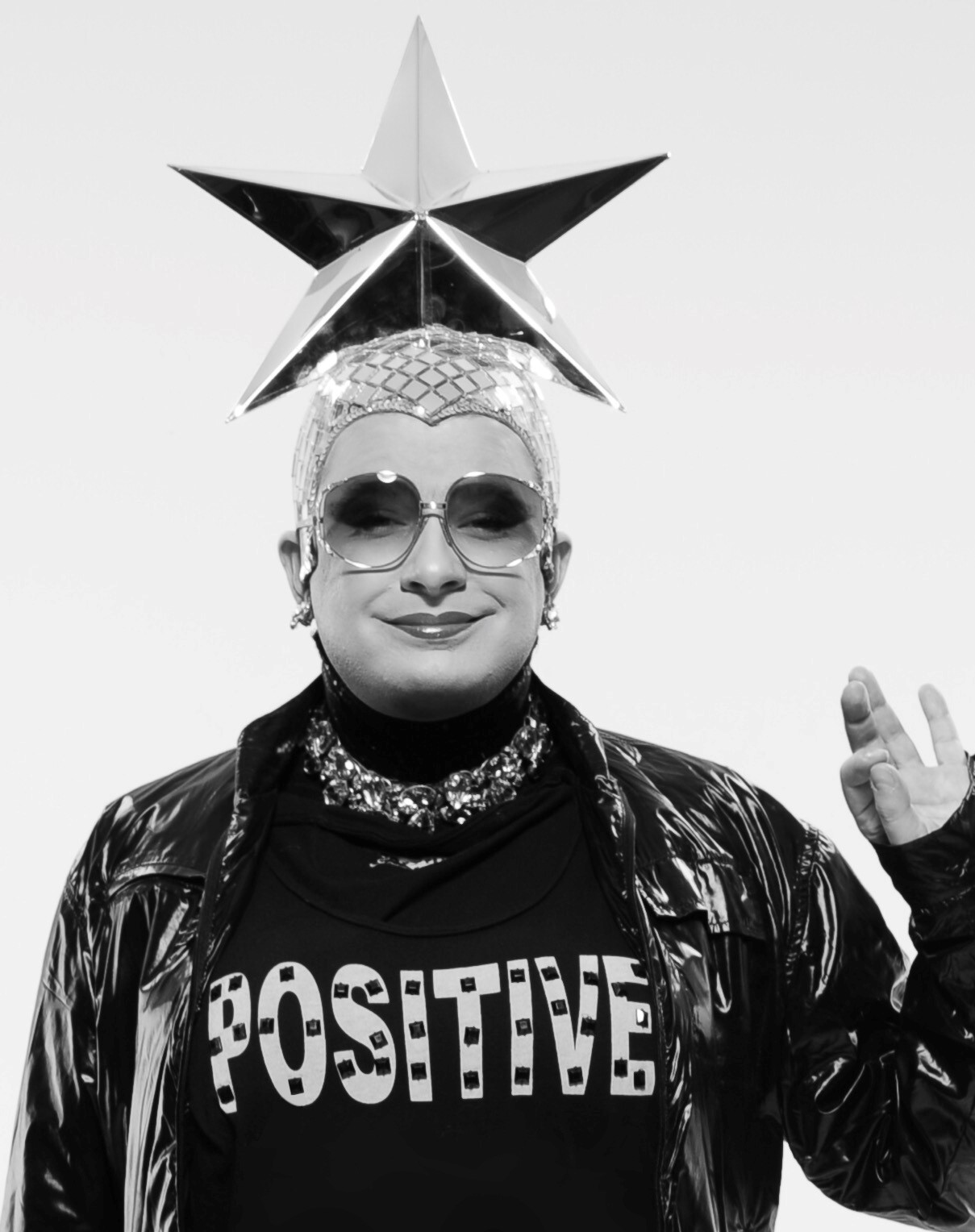
Danylko as Verka Serduchka

Danylko's visual image as Verka Serduchka is characterized by his persona's grotesque costumes, absurdly large breasts (according to Danylko himself, created with the help of inflated condoms) and the use of surzhyk. His initial popularity was amplified by the use of colloquial phrases and mentions of simple life situations, as well as a great talent for improvisation. After the beginning of Danylko's television and music career, Serduchka's visual appearance underwent a slight change, with railway uniform being replaced with a sparkle-covered jacket, and the inflated bust becoming even larger. The new image was finalized with torn tights, a green boa scarf and high-platformed shoes and can be seen as a parody on contemporary post-Soviet show business. Verka's provocative behaviour during interviews contributes to this effect.

== Personal life ==
Danylko has said in interviews that he does not engage in cross-dressing outside of his public performances, with a distinction between his stage persona and his personal life. He is reluctant to discuss his private affairs beyond this, though he has stated in interviews that he had a difficult relationship with a woman with whom he lived for eight years. In January 2015, photos of Danylko kissing actress Inna Bilokin were posted online by a friend.

== Controversy ==
=== 2007 Eurovision Song Contest entry ===
Following Serduchka's nomination to represent Ukraine at the 2007 Eurovision Song Contest, one of the country's nationwide FM radio stations organized a protest action in February 2007 to express their disapproval of the selection. Some Ukrainians and even members of the Ukrainian Parliament also expressed their disapproval, viewing the character of Serduchka as "grotesque and vulgar".

The invented words of Serduchka's Eurovision song "lasha tumbai" caused some controversy after the performance, as many people noted the phrase's similarity to "Russia goodbye". In early publicity appearances, Serduchka explained that "lasha tumbai" was a Mongolian expression for "whipped cream." His statement was denied by several Mongols who gave the correct phrase on a talk show broadcast by Channel One (Russia) just before the Eurovision Song Contest 2007. The Mongolian embassy in Moscow also said that "lasha tumbai" was total gibberish.

Danylko later made a brief phone-in appearance on the BBC's The Graham Norton Show, in which his comments made no sense whatsoever. Another call was made, but with a translator in the audience. In this instance, he appeared to tell guest Andrew Lloyd Webber he was "rubbish". However, in an interview with Metro's Andrew Williams, Danylko clarified his meaning:

AW: Why did you call Andrew Lloyd Webber ‘rubbish’ on The Graham Norton Show?

AD: Someone interpreted Serduchka wrongly. I meant I watched "Cats: the Musical" on TV. It was boring. You should watch a musical on the stage. Don't watch "Cats" on TV.

In the same interview, he stated that "lasha tumbai" was a somewhat made-up phrase that sounds like the Mongolian phrase for "milkshake" and that many Russians nevertheless managed to interpret it as saying "Russia goodbye!".

=== Performances in Russian during the Russo-Ukrainian War ===
In July 2024 Serduchka took part in a Jurmala song festival organized by Latvian singer Laima Vaikule, performing fragments of songs in Russian and Latvian languages. The performance, during which Serduchka bowed in front of one of the guests, Russian singer Alla Pugacheva, was criticized in the Ukrainian social media as a humiliation of Ukrainians, despite Pugacheva vocally opposing the Russian invasion of Ukraine.

In mid-June 2025, police in Kyiv Oblast launched an investigation into a complaint by TV presenter Viktor Dyachenko of the NGO "Ukrainian Language". The NGO discovered a post while monitoring social media that the singer had performed songs in the Russian language at a concert in Boryspil district on 13 June, violating Articles 23 and 29 of the Law "On Ensuring the Functioning of the Ukrainian Language as the State Language". There had also been an official moratorium on the public use of Russian-language music in Kyiv since 2023.

== Awards and recognition ==
In 2003, Danylko was honored with the title People's Artist of Ukraine. In 2007, Verka Serduchka received the Barbara Dex Award for worst outfit in the Eurovision Song Contest 2007.

Verka Serduchka's performance with the song "Dancing Lasha Tumbai" is one of the eight brightest numbers in the history of Eurovision.

In 2016, Serduchka's costume from the performance at "Eurovision-2007" went to the ABBA The Museum (Stockholm), where in honor of the 60th anniversary of the competition was an interactive exhibition "Good Evening, Europe!"

In 2020, the song "Dancing Lasha Tumbai" was heard in the BBC America thriller series Killing Eve in the episode "Are You from Pinner?", where the character Villanelle dances to the song at a harvest festival while visiting her rural Russian hometown.

In August 2022, by Decree of the President of Ukraine, Danylko was awarded the Order of Merit Third Class.

== Discography ==
Studio albums

- Kha-ra-sho! (2003)
- Chita Drita (2003)
- Posle tebya (2005) (released under the name Danilko: instrumental music)
- Tralli-Valli (2006)
- Doremi Doredo (2008)

== Filmography ==
=== As performer ===
- (2001): Vechera na khutore bliz Dikanki, a musical remake of the 1961 movie of the same name: Danylko portrayed "Serduchka, the Village Moonshiner" and performed Horilka.
- (2003): Zolushka (Cinderella): the wicked stepsister Brunhilda. Songs included Ya ne ponyala ("I don't understand"), performed together with the pop trio VIA Gra.
- (2003): The Crazy Day or The Marriage of Figaro, a musical remake of the Beaumarchais play: Cherubino (a male character).
- (2004): The Fair at Sorochyntsi (Sorochinskaya yarmarka), an adaptation of Gogol's story. Songs included "Ti napivsya yak svinya" ("You're drunk as a pig") and "Ne kupish lyubov" ("You can't buy love").
- (2004): Za dvumya zaytsami ("Chasing two hares"), a musical remake of a 1961 comedy: a double role as "Svetlana Markovna" and "Anton the Maniac".
- (2005): "Три мушкетера" ("The Three Musketeers").
- (2006): "The Adventures of Verka Serduchka".
- (2007): "Очень новогоднее кино, или Ночь в музее" ("New Year's Movie; or Night at the Museum").
- (2010): "Морозко" ("Jack Frost").
- (2011): "The New Adventures of Aladdin", starring Oscar Kucera and Ani Lorak: "the Genie".
- (2012): "Красная шапочка" ("Little Red Riding Hood"): the title role.
- (2013): "Три богатыря" ("Three Warriors").
- (2015): Spy, a cameo appearance as Verka Serduchka.

=== As composer ===
- (2009): Весельчаки (Veselchaki): a comedy about performers at a drag club.

== Notes ==
Awards and achievements
Preceded by Tina Karol with "Show Me Your Love"	Ukraine in the Eurovision Song Contest; 2007	Succeeded by Ani Lorak with "Shady Lady"
