= Sinora =

Sinora (Greek "borderland") may refer to:

- Sinora, Patras
- Sinora, an ancient Greek border fortress on the border of modern Turkey and Armenia, in Turkish Sünür
- Sinora (album), Kostas Martakis 2016
