= An Kapou Kapote =

An Kapou Kapote Άν Κάπου Κάποτε

Studio album by Kostas Martakis
- Released: 23 December 2013
- Genre: pop
- Length: 43:58
- Languages: Greek, English
- Label: Platinum Records
- Producer: Kostas Martakis

Kostas Martakis chronology
Entasi (2011)	An Kapou Kapote; Άν Κάπου Κάποτε (2013)	Sinora (2016)

Singles from An Kapou Kapote
- 1. "Mou Pires Kati" Released: 1 October 2012; 2. "Tatouaz" Released: 5 February 2013; 3. "Ta Kalokairina Ta S' Agapo" Released: 27 May 2013; 4. "Paradise" Released: 17 June 2013; 5. "Mathimatika" Released: 20 September 2013; 6. "An Kapou Kapote" Released: 8 January 2014

An Kapou Kapote (Greek: Άν Κάπου Κάποτε; English: If Somewhere Sometime) is the title of the fourth studio album by the Greek artist Kostas Martakis, released on 23 December 2013 by Platinum Records in Greece and Cyprus.

== Track listing ==
No.	Title	Lyrics	Music	Length
1.	"An Kapou Kapote" (Άν Κάπου Κάποτε; If Somewhere Sometime)	Eleni Giannatsoulia	Marios Psimopoulos	3:59
2.	"Ta Kalokairina Ta S' Agapo" (Τα Καλοκαιρινά Τα Σ' Αγαπώ; The Summer's In Love)	Vicki Gerothodorou	Stelios Rokkos	3:42
3.	"Mathimatika" (Μαθηματικά; Mathematics)	Vicki Gerothodorou	Giorgos Papadopoulos	3:36
4.	"Mou Pires Kati" (Μου Πήρες Κάτι; You took something from me)	Eleni Giannatsoulia	Marios Psimopoulos	3:46
5.	"Mono Kati Apogevmata" (Μόνο Κάτι Απογεύματα; Only Thing Afternoons)	Akis Petrou	Giorgos Papadopoulos	3:40
6.	"Horis Agapi" (Χωρίς Αγάπη; Without Love)	Ifigenia	Giorgos Papadopoulos	3:36
7.	"Sta Oneira Sou" (Στα Όνειρα Σου; In Your Dreams)	DJ Kas, Panos Nikolakopoulos	Nikos Voutouras	3:30
8.	"Tatouaz" (Τατουάζ; Tattoo)	Vicki Gerothodorou	Alex Leon	3:42
9.	"Mamacita Buena"	Vicki Gerothodorou	Claydee	3:55
10.	"Paradise"	Panos Nikolakopoulos	Nikos Voutouras	3:30
11.	"Right Move vs. Alex Leon"	Vicki Gerothodorou	Alex Leon	3:20
12.	"Ta Kalokairina Ta S' Agapo [Mark Angelo Remix]" (Τα Καλοκαιρινά Τα Σ' Αγαπώ; The Summer's In Love)	Vicki Gerothodorou	Stelios Rokkos	3:42

== Release history ==
Region	Date	Label	Format	Version
Greece	23 December 2013	Platinum Records	CD	Original
Cyprus	23 December 2013	Platinum Records	CD	Original

== Personnel ==
- Kostas Martakis – executive producer
- Giorgos Kalfamanolis – photography
- Creative Cow – artwork
