= Sinora (album) =

Sinora Σύνορα

Studio album by Kostas Martakis
- Released: 28 March 2016
- Studio: Bi-Kay studio
- Genre: Pop
- Length: 41:43
- Language: Greek
- Label: Panik Platinum
- Producer: Kostas Martakis; Kiriakos Papadopoulos

Kostas Martakis chronology
An Kapou Kapote (2013)	Sinora; Σύνορα (2016)

Singles from Sinora
- 1. "Oute Ixeres" Released: 16 March 2015; 2. "Pes To Nai" Released: 22 June 2015; 3. "Ego Tha Figo" Released: 2 November 2015; 4. "Panta Tha Zeis" Released: 7 March 2016; 5. "Sinora (Remix)" Released: 26 September 2016

Sinora (Greek: Σύνορα; English: Borderland) is the title of the fifth studio album by Greek singer, Kostas Martakis. It was released on 28 March 2016 by Panik Platinum and soon certified gold, selling over 10,000 units, but later received platinum certification. He also was awarded on the Cypriot show Super Music Awards.

== Tracklist ==
All music is composed by Kiriakos Papadopoulos

No.	Title	Lyrics	Length
1.	"Sinora" (Σύνορα; Borderland)	Ilias Filippou	4:24
2.	"Pes To Nai" (Πες Το Ναι; Say Yes)	Vicky Gerothodorou	3:36
3.	"Ego Tha Figo" (Εγώ Θα Φύγω; I'll Leave)	Natalia Germanou	4:01
4.	"Panta Tha Zeis" (Πάντα Θα Ζείς; Always You'll Live)	Giorgos Tsopanis	3:27
5.	"Einai N' Aporeis" (Είναι Ν' Απορείς; Is Wonder)	Ilias Philippou	3:41
6.	"Nihtes Monahikes" (Νύχτες Μοναχικές; Lonely Nights)	Eleni Giannatsoulia	3:39
7.	"Oute Ixeres" (Ούτε Ήξερες; Neither Knew)	Ilias Philippou	3:26
8.	"Mi Kikloforeis" (Μη Κυκλοφορείς; Don't Move Around)	Evi Droutsa	3:15
9.	"Alli Mia Fora" (Άλλη Μια Φορά; One More Time)	Giorgos Tsopanis	4:32
10.	"Sinora (Remix)"		3:42
Total length:			41:43

== Singles ==
The following songs were officially released as singles, some of them with music videos:

1. "Oute Ixeres" (Music Video Release: 22 May 2015)
2. "Pes To Nai" (Music Video Release: 22 June 2015)
3. "Ego Tha Figo" (Music Video Release: 25 November 2015)
4. "Panta Tha Zeis" (Music Video Release: 18 April 2016)
5. "Sinora (Remix)" (Music Video Release: 4 December 2016)

== Release ==
Region	Date	Label	Format	Version	Certification
Greece	28 March 2016	Panik Platinum	CD	Original	Platinum
Cyprus	28 March 2016	Panik Platinum	CD	Original	Platinum

== Credits ==
Credits adapted from liner notes.

=== Personnel ===
- Alexandros Arkadopoulos – kaval (4)
- Christos Bousdoukos – violin (3, 5)
- Panagiotis Brakoulias – orchestration, programming, keyboards, guitars, bouzouki (5)
- Sotiris Chondos – percussion (7)
- Akis Diximos – backing vocals (1, 2, 4, 5, 6, 7, 8, 10)
- Stelios Fragkos – guitars (6, 7)
- Antonis Gounaris – guitars (8)
- Vaya Kalantzi – saxophone (1)
- Giannis Kifonidis – orchestration, programming, keyboards (6, 7)
- Katerina Kiriakou – backing vocals (1, 2, 4, 5, 6, 7, 8, 10)
- Kostas Laskarakis – drums (6, 7)
- Kostas Liolios – drums (1, 3)
- Babis Maragkos – orchestration, programming, keyboards (4)
- Zaharias Maragkos – guitars (3, 8, 9, 10)
- Arsenis Nasis – percussion (4)
- Kiriakos Papadopoulos – orchestration, programming, keyboards (1, 10)
- Kostas Papageorgiou – guitars (1)
- Alex Papakonstantinou – bass (6, 7)
- Giannis Perdikaris – guitars (4)
- Pantelis Taladianos – orchestration, programming, keyboards (3, 9)
- Panagiotis Terzidis – bouzouki (8, 9)
- Leonidas Tzitzos – orchestration, programming, keyboards (2, 8)
- Giorgos Zafiriou – bass (1, 3)

=== Production ===
- Kiriakos Asteriou – sound engineer, mix engineer (1, 2, 4, 10)
- Konstantinos Georgantas – artwork
- Giannis Kifonidis – sound engineer, mix engineer (3, 5, 6, 7, 8, 9) / mastering (1, 4, 5, 6, 8, 9, 10)
- Maraddin – photographer
- Kostas Martakis – executive producer
- Kiriakos Papadopoulos – production manager
- Paul Stefanidis (Viking Lounge) – mastering (2, 3, 7)
