= A1 discography =

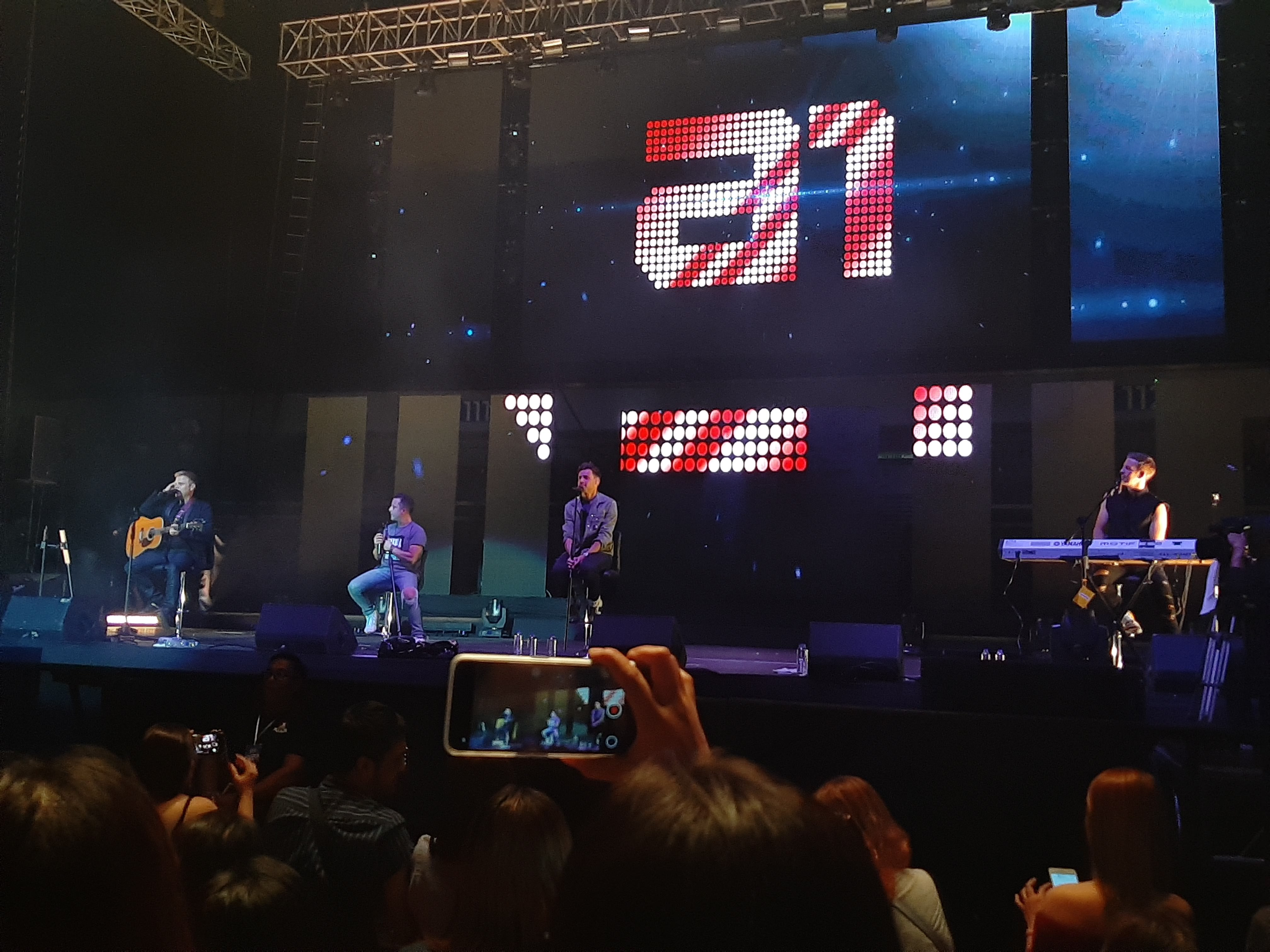
- A1's performance at the Playback Music Festival, 9 November 2019
- Studio albums: 5
- Compilation albums: 4
- Singles: 20
- Music videos: 15

The discography of A1, British/Norwegian boy band. Their first single, "Be the First to Believe", entered the UK singles chart at No.6 in early 1999. They had relative success in the charts with two number 1s and six other top 10 hits. Adding to this they also won a BRIT Award for "British Breakthrough Act" in 2001. A1's journey came to an end when original member Paul Marazzi left in 2002 and the band subsequently decided to split.

In August 2009 it was announced that the group would reform, albeit without Marazzi, in Norway for a series of concerts in Oslo in December 2009 at the Christiania Theatre.

== Albums ==
=== Studio albums ===
Title	Album details	Peak chart positions										Certifications
Title	Album details	UK	NOR	AUS	DEN	EUR	FIN	IRE	NZ	SCO	SWE	Certifications
Here We Come	Released: 2 December 1999; Label: Columbia (#4961362); Formats: CS, CD	20	4	111	—	93	—	—	—	31	—	UK: Gold
The A List	Released: 30 October 2000; Label: Columbia (#5011952); Formats: CS, CD, MD	14	4	—	23	57	—	69	—	10	—	UK: Gold; NOR: Platinum
Make It Good	Released: 8 April 2002; Label: Columbia (#5082212); Formats: CS, CD	15	4	94	19	35	28	—	37	15	31	NOR: Gold
Waiting for Daylight	Released: 11 October 2010; Label: Universal (#0602527472928); Formats: CD, Digital download	—	5	—	—	—	—	—	—	—	—	
Rediscovered	Released: 2 November 2012; Label: daWorks Records (#DACD635); Formats: CD, Digital download	—	17	—	—	—	—	—	—	—	—	
"—" denotes items that did not chart or were not released in that territory.

=== Compilation albums ===
Title	Album details
A1	North American debut album; Released: 25 June 2002; Label: Columbia (#86628); Formats: CD
The Best of A1	Exclusively Asian compilation album; Released: 9 August 2004; Label: Columbia (#5121382); Formats: CD
Greatest Hits	European compilation album; Released: 2 February 2009; Label: Sony (#88697472552); Formats: CD, Digital download
Caught in the Middle: The Collection	Worldwide compilation album; Released: 29 April 2016; Label: Music Club Deluxe (#MCDLX218); Formats: CD, Digital download

== Singles ==
Year	Title	Peak chart positions										Certifications	Album
Year	Title	UK	NOR	AUS	DEN	EUR	GER	IRE	NZ	SCO	SWE	Certifications	Album
1999	"Be the First to Believe"	6	—	115	—	31	95	—	—	6	48		Here We Come
1999	"Summertime of Our Lives"	5	—	44	—	25	—	—	22	6	—		Here We Come
1999	"Ready or Not" / "Everytime"	3	3	110	—	17	91	—	—	3	56	NOR: Gold	Here We Come
2000	"Like a Rose"	6	11	—	—	30	—	16	—	3	—		Here We Come
2000	"Take On Me"	1	1	46	—	11	61	12	—	1	9	UK: Silver; NOR: Gold	The A List
2000	"Same Old Brand New You"	1	1	85	20	10	—	18	—	2	15	UK: Silver; NOR: Gold	The A List
2001	"No More"	6	—	—	—	29	—	35	—	5	56		The A List
2002	"Caught in the Middle"	2	3	23	2	20	68	19	14	3	7	UK: Silver; AUS: Gold; DEN: Gold	Make It Good
2002	"Make It Good"	11	6	—	14	43	—	50	—	9	55		Make It Good
2002	"Nos Differences" (with Ève Angeli)	—	—	—	—	50	—	—	—	—	—		Make It Good
2009	"Take You Home"	—	9	—	—	—	—	—	—	—	—		Waiting for Daylight
2010	"Don't Wanna Lose You Again"	—	4	—	—	—	—	—	—	—	—		Waiting for Daylight
2010	"In Love and I Hate It"	—	13	—	—	—	—	—	—	—	—		Waiting for Daylight
2011	"Waiting for Daylight"	—	—	—	—	—	—	—	—	—	—		Waiting for Daylight
2011	"Another Year Gone"	—	—	—	—	—	—	—	—	—	—		Waiting for Daylight
2012	"Do I Need a Reason" (with D'Sound)	—	—	—	—	—	—	—	—	—	—		Non-album single
2012	"Just Three Words"	—	—	—	—	—	—	—	—	—	—		Rediscovered
2012	"Trust Me"	—	—	—	—	—	—	—	—	—	—		Rediscovered
2013	"Christopher Columbus"	—	—	—	—	—	—	—	—	—	—		Rediscovered
2014	"Critical Love"	—	—	—	—	—	—	—	—	—	—		Non-album singles
2018	"Armour"	—	—	—	—	—	—	—	—	—	—		Non-album singles
2021	"Spiders"	—	—	—	—	—	—	—	—	—	—		Non-album singles
2023	"Call Me When You Land"	—	—	—	—	—	—	—	—	—	—		Non-album singles
2023	"I Think I Killed Rudolph" (with Subwoolfer)	—	—	—	—	—	—	—	—	—	—		Non-album singles
2026	"In Love in the Philippines"	—	—	—	—	—	—	—	—	—	—		Non-album single
"—" denotes items that did not chart or were not released in that territory.
