= A1 (album) =

Compilation album by A1
- Released: 25 June 2002
- Genres: Pop, pop rock
- Label: Columbia
- Producers: Mike Hedges, Metro, Chris Porter, Eric Foster White

A1 chronology
Make It Good (2002)	A1 (2002)	The Best of A1 (2004)

Singles from A1
- 1. "Caught in the Middle" Released: 2002

A1 is a compilation album, fourth overall release by English-Norwegian pop group A1, released as their North American debut album on 25 June 2002 by Columbia. The album consists of songs from the group's first three studio albums, Here We Come (1999), The A List (2000), and Make It Good (2002).

== Track listing ==
No.	Title	Writer(s)	Producer(s)	Length
1.	"Caught in the Middle"	Ben Adams, Paul Marazzi, Chris Porter, Rick Mitra	Mike Hedges	3:26
2.	"Make It Good"	Christian Ingebrigtsen, Mark Read	Hedges	4:00
3.	"When I'm Missing You"	Adams, Ingebrigtsen, Marazzi, Read, Tim Woodcock, Tim Lever	Hedges	3:29
4.	"Everytime"	Adams, Ingebrigtsen, Read	Metro	4:32
5.	"If I Can't Have You"	Adams, Read, Mitra	Hedges	3:53
6.	"One More Try"	Adams, Ingebrigtsen, Marazzi, Read	Chris Porter	3:27
7.	"Same Old Brand New You"	Eric Foster White, Adams, Ingebrigtsen, Read	Eric Foster White	4:15
