= Greatest Hits (A1 album) =

Compilation album by A1

Compilation album by a1
- Released: 2 February 2009
- Recorded: 1999–2002
- Genre: Pop
- Length: 37:05
- Label: Sony Music
- Producer: Rick Pope

A1 chronology
The Best of A1 (2004)	Greatest Hits (2009)	Waiting for Daylight (2010)

Greatest Hits is the second compilation album released by the British-Norwegian boyband A1. Released on 2 February 2009, following band-member Ben Adams' appearance on Celebrity Big Brother, the album was a commercial failure, following poor promotion and very low sales.

== Critical reception ==
AllMusic reviewer Jon O'Brien gave the album 3.5 stars out of 5, stating: "One of the last British boy bands to make an impact on the charts, the four-piece A1 scored two chart-toppers, a Brit Award, and three Top 20 albums in their short three-year career. Released to coincide with Ben Adams' appearance on Celebrity Big Brother, this belated Greatest Hits collection reveals that seven years after their split, the majority of their ten Top 20 singles have aged better than you'd expect. From their debut album, Here We Come, lead single "Be the First to Believe" is an infectious disco anthem packed with about three different choruses and "Summertime of Our Lives" is a Gallic house-inspired number that's as uplifting as its title suggests, while "Everytime" is an epic string-laden ballad that showcases the band's rather impressive songwriting skills. Unfortunately, "Like a Rose" is so wet that it makes Westlife look like Nine Inch Nails, while "Ready or Not" is sugar-coated Motown that's just a little too sickly sweet. From their most successful period with The A List album, their two number ones suffer contrasting fortunes. Their cover of a-ha's "Take On Me" sounded woefully dated on its release, and sounds even cheaper nine years later, but "Same Old Brand New You" is a glorious dance-pop stomper that recalls the Backstreet Boys at their finest. On their final album, Make It Good, out went the brightly colored tank tops and unashamedly pure pop, and in came the musical instruments and a more mature acoustic sound. This attempt to be taken more seriously worked wonders for them on the brilliant "Caught in the Middle" but sounded contrived on the title track, their last single and also their first to miss the Top Ten. The three non-album tracks included here, a pointless rendition of "Three Times a Lady" and two rather unremarkable ballads, suggest A1 were definitely a singles band. But even though they may have not been as credible as 5ive or as consistently successful as Blue, this Greatest Hits suggests they were far more fun. Those wishing to immerse themselves in the final throes of the traditional boy band genre will find much to appreciate in this unpretentious and surprisingly eclectic collection of pop songs."

== Track listing ==
No.	Title	Writer(s)	Album	Length
1.	"Caught in the Middle"	Adams, Marazzi, Mitra, Porter	Make It Good	3:27
2.	"Same Old Brand New You"	Adams, Ingebrigtsen, Read, White	The A List	4:15
3.	"Take On Me"	Furuholmen, Harket, Waaktaar	The A List	3:34
4.	"Everytime"	Adams, Ingebrigtsen, Read	Here We Come	4:30
5.	"Like a Rose"	Steve Mac, Wayne Hector, Adams	Here We Come	4:13
6.	"Be the First to Believe"	Adams, Cunnah, Ingebrigtsen, Marazzi	Here We Come	3:20
7.	"Ready or Not"	Adams, Cunnah, Ingebrigtsen, Marazzi	Here We Come	3:54
8.	"Summertime of Our Lives"	Adams, Cunnah, Ingebrigtsen, Marazzi	Here We Come	3:23
9.	"No More"	Bensusen, Cueni, Robbins, Sharpe	The A List	3:39
10.	"Make It Good"	Ingebrigtsen, Read	Make It Good	3:38
11.	"Three Times a Lady"	Richie	B-Side to No More single	3:38
12.	"Learn to Fly"	Gordeno, Ingebrigtsen, Mitra, Porter	Make It Good	4:12
13.	"Living The Dream"	Cunnah, Nichols	The A List	3:56
Total length:				37:05
