= List of UK top-ten singles in 1999 =

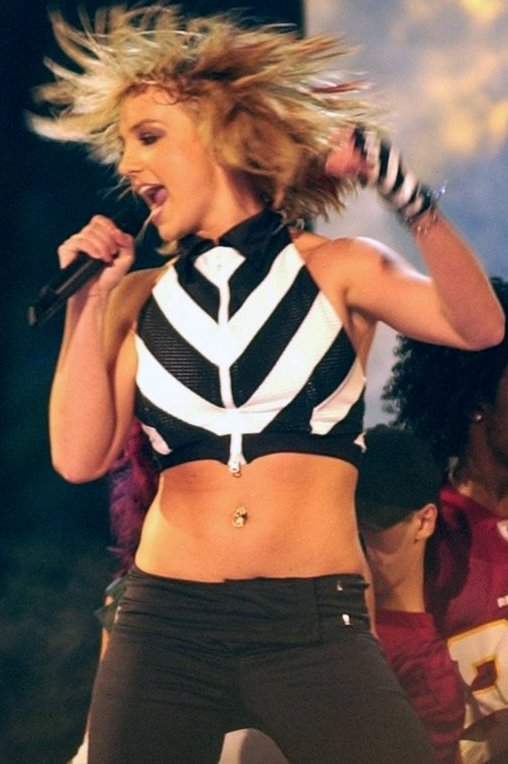
Britney Spears made her arrival into the UK charts in 1999, scoring three top 10 entries, including her debut hit "...Baby One More Time", which spent two weeks at number-one and became the best-selling single of the year.

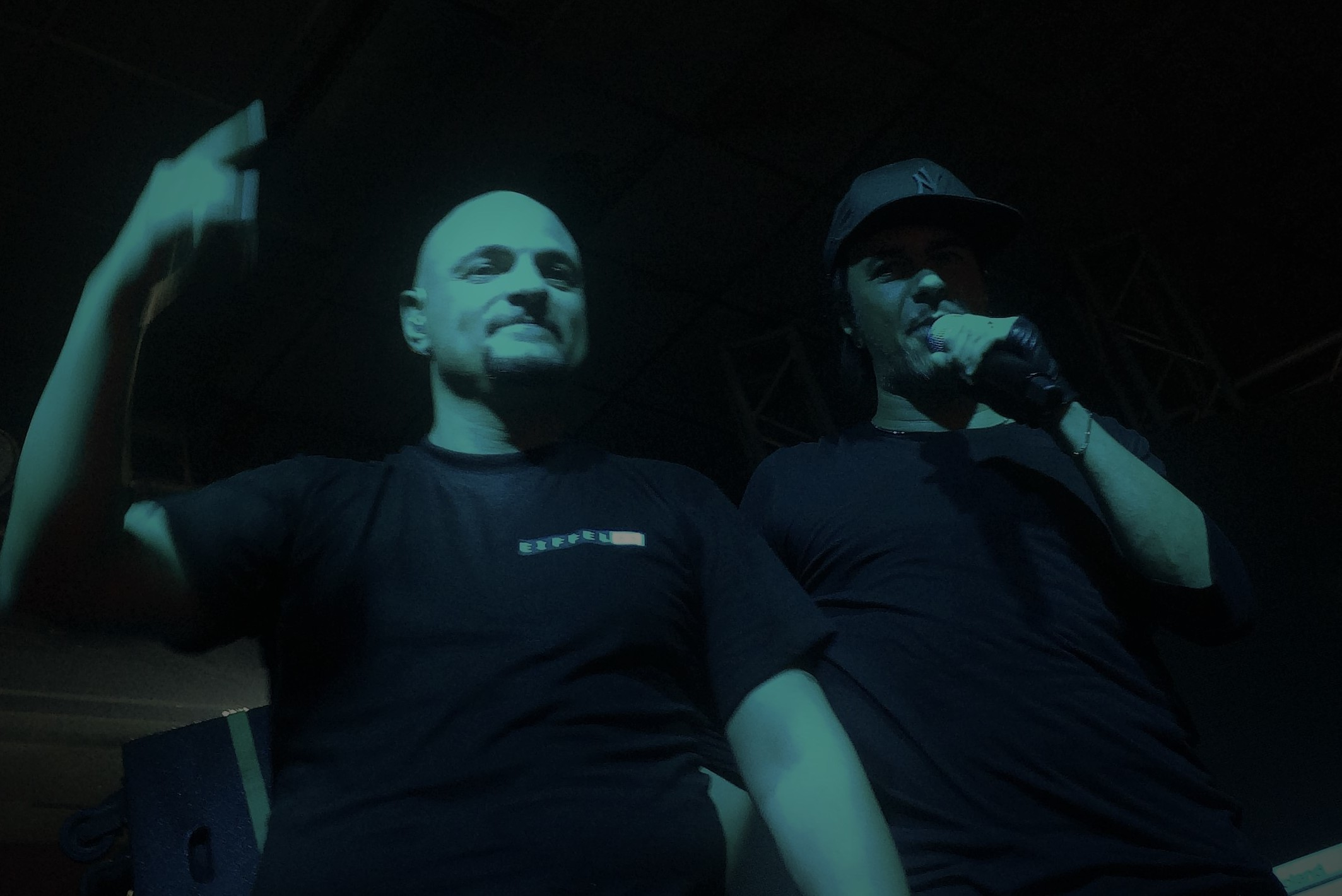
Italian group Eiffel 65 achieved the second best selling single of the year with "Blue (Da Ba Dee)", which spent three weeks at number-one.

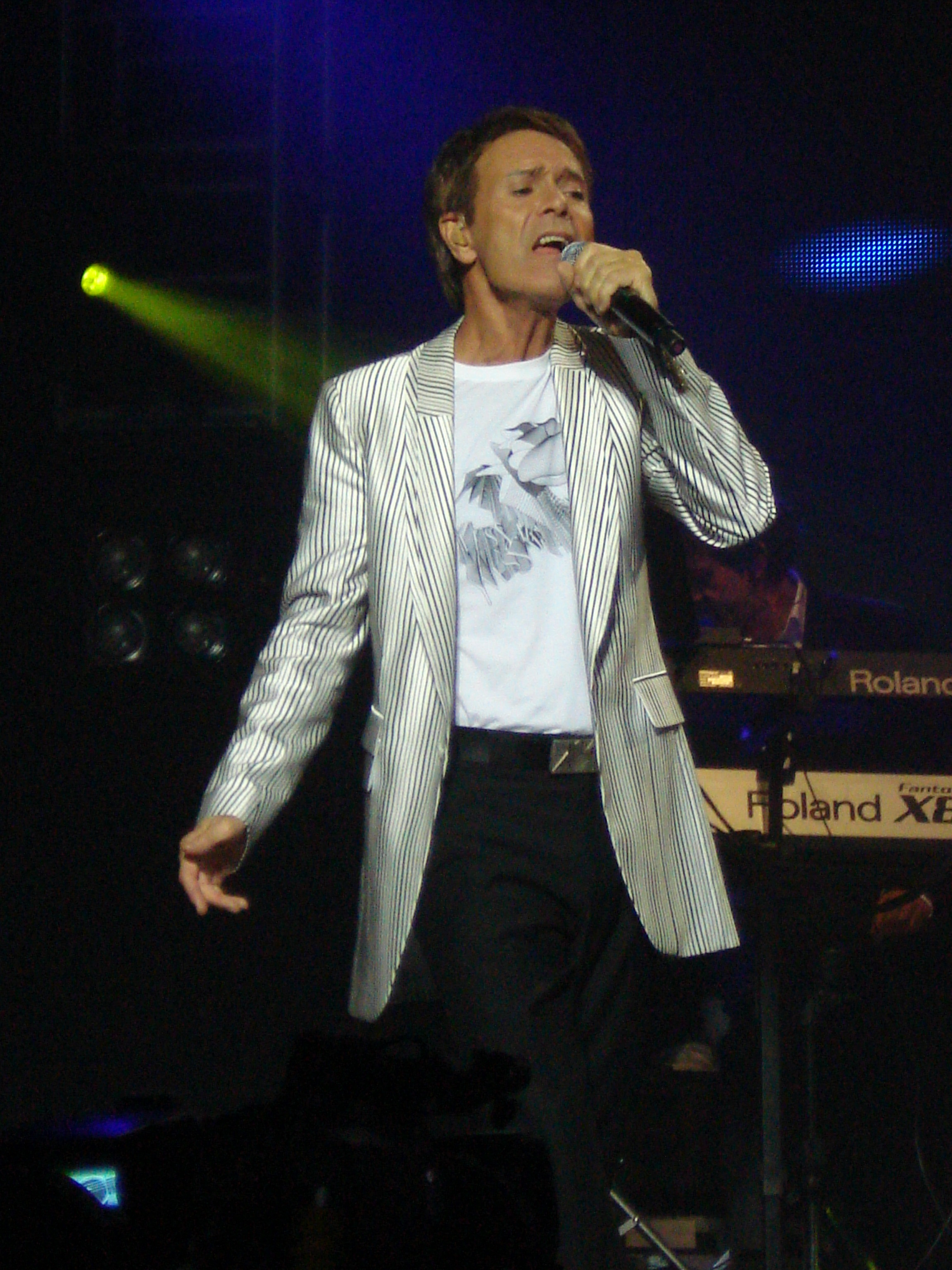
Cliff Richard secured his fourteenth UK number-one single in 1999 with "The Millennium Prayer", which topped the chart for three weeks and became the year's third best selling single.

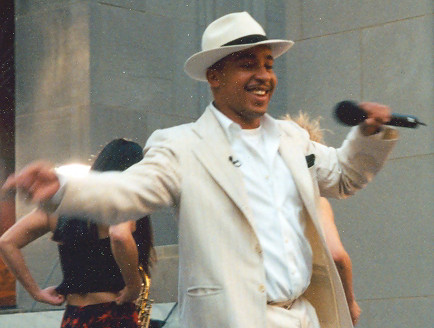
German singer Lou Bega had the fourth best selling single of the year with "Mambo No. 5 (A Little Bit Of...)", which stayed at number-one for two weeks.

The UK Singles Chart is one of many music charts compiled by the Official Charts Company that calculates the best-selling singles of the week in the United Kingdom. Before 2004, the chart was only based on the sales of physical singles. This list shows singles that peaked in the Top 10 of the UK Singles Chart during 1999, as well as singles which peaked in 1998 and 2000 but were in the top 10 in 1999. The entry date is when the song appeared in the top 10 for the first time (week ending, as published by the Official Charts Company, which is six days after the chart is announced).

Two hundred and three singles were in the top ten in 1999. Nine singles from 1998 remained in the top 10 for several weeks at the beginning of the year, while "Mr. Hankey, the Christmas Poo" by Mr. Hankey, "Say You'll Be Mine"/"Better the Devil You Know" by Steps and "Two in a Million"/"You're My Number One" by S Club 7 were all released in 1999 but did not reach their peak until 2000. "Chocolate Salty Balls" by Chef and "Heartbeat"/"Tragedy" by Steps were the singles from 1998 to reach their peak in 1999. Forty-eight artists scored multiple entries in the top 10 in 1999. Christina Aguilera, Britney Spears, Eminem, Jennifer Lopez, S Club 7 and Westlife were among the many artists who achieved their first UK charting top 10 single in 1999.

The first number-one single of the year was "Chocolate Salty Balls" by Chef, the South Park character voiced by Isaac Hayes. Overall, thirty-six different singles peaked at number-one in 1999, with Westlife (4) having the most singles hit that position.

== Background ==
=== Multiple entries ===
Two-hundred and three singles charted in the top 10 in 1999, with one-hundred and ninety-three singles reaching their peak this year.

Forty-eight artists scored multiple entries in the top 10 in 1999. Steps had the most top 10 singles in 1999 with seven entries. Seven artists recorded four singles which reached the top 10 this year: Another Level, B*Witched, Melanie C, Ronan Keating, Vengaboys, Westlife and Will Smith.

Britney Spears was one of nine artists with three top 10 entries, including the number-one single "...Baby One More Time". A1, Boyzone, Geri Halliwell, Honeyz, Lolly, Martine McCutcheon, S Club 7 and TQ were among the other artists who had multiple top 10 entries in 1999.

=== Chart debuts ===
Seventy-three artists achieved their first top 10 single in 1999, either as a lead or featured artist. Of these, twelve went on to record another hit single that year: Alice DeeJay, ATB, Basement Jaxx, Cartoons, Eminem, Glamma Kid, Jennifer Lopez, NSYNC, The Offspring, Phats & Small, Shanks & Bigfoot, Travis, A1, Britney Spears, Lolly, Martine McCutcheon, S Club 7 and TQ all had two more top 10 singles in 1999. Westlife had three other entries in their breakthrough year.

The following table (collapsed on desktop site) does not include acts who had previously charted as part of a group and secured their first top 10 solo single.

Artist	Number of top 10s	First entry	Chart position	Other entries
Blockster	1	"You Should Be..."	3	—
Ultra	1	"Rescue Me"	8	—
Porn Kings	1	"Up to the Wildstyle"	10	—
DJ Supreme	1	"Up to the Wildstyle"	10	—
Emmie	1	"More than This"	5	—
Cassius	1	"Cassius 1999"	7	—
All Seeing I	1	"Walk like a Panther"	10	—
The Offspring	2	"Pretty Fly (for a White Guy)"	1	"Why Don't You Get a Job?" (2)
TQ	3	"Westside"	4	"Bye Bye Baby" (7), "Summertime" (7)
Gay Dad	1	"To Earth with Love"	10	—
Armand Van Helden	1	"You Don't Know Me"	1	—
Duane Harden	1	"You Don't Know Me"	1	—
The Divine Comedy	1	"National Express"	8	—
A+	1	"Enjoy Yourself"	5	—
Soulsearcher	1	"Can't Get Enough"	8	—
DJ Sakin & Friends	1	"Protect Your Mind (For the Love of a Princess)"	4	—
Barenaked Ladies	1	"One Week"	5	—
Unkle	1	"Be There"	8	—
Britney Spears	3	"...Baby One More Time"	1	"Sometimes" (3), "(You Drive Me) Crazy" (5)
NSYNC	2	"I Want You Back"	5	"Tearin' Up My Heart" (9)
Shawn Mullins	1	"Lullaby"	9	—
Mr. Oizo	1	"Flat Beat"	1	—
Cartoons	2	"Witch Doctor"	2	"DooDah!" (7)
New Radicals	1	"You Get What You Give"	5	—
Eminem	2	"My Name Is"	2	"Guilty Conscience" (5)
Phats & Small	2	"Turn Around"	2	"Feel Good" (7)
Martine McCutcheon	3	"Perfect Moment"	1	"I've Got You" (6), "Talking In Your Sleep"/"Love Me" (6)
Glamma Kid	2	"Taboo"	10	"Why?" (10)
Westlife	4	"Swear It Again"	1	"If I Let You Go" (1), "Flying Without Wings" (1), "I Have a Dream"/"Seasons in the Sun" (1)
Basement Jaxx	2	"Red Alert"	5	"Rendez-Vu" (4)
Shanks & Bigfoot	2	"Sweet Like Chocolate"	1	"Straight from the Heart" as Doolally (9)
Sixpence None the Richer	1	"Kiss Me"	4	—
Precious	1	"Say It Again"	6	—
Hepburn	1	"I Quit"	8	—
Sugar Ray	1	"Every Morning"	10	—
The Wiseguys	1	"Ooh La La"	2	—
Chicane	1	"Saltwater"	6	—
Baz Luhrmann	1	"Everybody's Free (To Wear Sunscreen)"	1	—
S Club 7	3	"Bring It All Back"	1	"S Club Party" (2), "Two in a Million"/"You're My Number One" (2) ^{[A]}
Adam Rickitt	1	"I Breathe Again"	5	—
ATB	2	"9PM (Till I Come)"	1	"Don't Stop!" (3)
Jennifer Lopez	2	"If You Had My Love"	4	"Waiting for Tonight" (5)
A1	3	"Be the First to Believe"	6	"Summertime of Our Lives" (5), "Ready or Not"/"Everytime" (3)
Lolly	3	"Viva La Radio"	7	"Mickey" (4), "Big Boys Don't Cry"/"Rockin' Robin" (10)
Yomanda	1	"Synths & Strings"	8	—
Alice Deejay	2	"Better Off Alone"	2	"Back in My Life" (4)
Travis	2	"Why Does It Always Rain On Me?"	10	"Turn" (8)
Bran Van 3000	1	"Drinking in L.A."	3	—
Apollo 440	1	"Stop the Rock"	10	—
Lou Bega	1	"Mambo No. 5 (A Little Bit of...)"	1	—
Shaft	1	"(Mucho Mambo) Sway"	2	—
Moloko	1	"Sing It Back"	4	—
DJ Jean	1	"The Launch"	2	—
Enrique Iglesias	1	"Bailamos"	4	—
Thunderbugs	1	"Friends Forever"	5	—
Leftfield	1	"Afrika Shox"	7	—
Afrika Bambaataa	1	"Afrika Shox"	7	—
Eiffel 65	1	"Blue (Da Ba Dee)"	1	—
Funkstar De Luxe	1	"Sun Is Shining"	3	—
Paul Johnson	1	"Get Get Down"	5	—
Macy Gray	1	"I Try"	6	—
Christina Aguilera	1	"Genie in a Bottle"	1	—
Ann Lee	1	"2 Times"	2	—
Buffalo Tom	1	"Going Underground"/"Carnation"	6	—
Wamdue Project	1	"King of My Castle"	1	—
Artful Dodger	1	"Re-Rewind (The Crowd Say Bo Selecta)"	1	—
Craig David	1	"Re-Rewind (The Crowd Say Bo Selecta)"	1	—
Mario Più	1	"Communication (Somebody Answer the Phone)"	5	—
Atomic Kitten	1	"Right Now"	10	—
William Orbit	1	"Barber's Adagio for Strings"	4	—
Progress presents The Boy Wunda	1	"Everybody"	7	—
Len	1	"Steal My Sunshine"	8	—
Cuban Boys	1	"Cognoscenti vs. Intelligentsia"	4	—
Mr. Hankey	1	"Mr. Hankey, the Christmas Poo" ^{[B]}	4	—

Notes

Geri Halliwell left Spice Girls in 1999 and recorded her debut solo single, "Look at Me", peaking at number 2. She also had two further entries this year - "Mi Chico Latino" and "Lift Me Up" both topped the chart. Her former bandmate Emma Bunton lent her talents to Tin Tin Out's "What I Am", steering the song to number two. Maire Brennan was in the line-up of Clannad who scored their first and only top 10 single in 1981 with "Theme from Harry's Game". She appeared on Chicane's "Saltwater" as a featured artist in 1999.

"When You Say Nothing at All" was Ronan Keating's first chart entry separate from Boyzone, who he also had three hit singles with this year. Shanks & Bigfoot were originally known as Doolally. "Straight from the Heart" peaked at number 20 under this name in 1998 but its re-release made the top 10 in 1999. Jordan Knight of New Kids on the Block kicked off his solo career in 1999 with his sole top 10 hit, "Give It to You", making number five.

Oasis singer Liam Gallagher and Steve Cradock from Ocean Colour Scene both appeared on Buffalo Tom's "Going Underground"/"Carnation". In both cases it was their first recording independent of their bands to make the top 10.

=== Songs from films ===
Original songs from various films entered the top 10 throughout the year. These included "From the Heart" and "When You Say Nothing at All" (from Notting Hill) and "Wild Wild West" (Wild Wild West).

=== Best-selling singles ===
Britney Spears had the best-selling single of the year with "...Baby One More Time". The song spent weeks in the top 10 (including weeks at number one), sold over 1.445 million copies and was certified 2× platinum by the BPI. "Blue (Da Ba Dee)" by Eiffel 65 came in second place, selling more than 956,000 copies and losing out by around 489,000 sales. Cliff Richard's "The Millennium Prayer", "Mambo No. 5 (A Little Bit of...)" from Lou Bega and "9PM (Till I Come)" by ATB made up the top five. Singles by Ricky Martin, Shania Twain, Shanks & Bigfoot, Mr. Oizo and Christina Aguilera were also in the top ten best-selling singles of the year.

"...Baby One More Time" (8) also ranked in the top 10 best-selling singles of the decade.

== Top-ten singles ==
Symbol	Meaning
‡	Single peaked in 1998 but still in chart in 1999.
♦	Single released in 1999 but peaked in 2000.
(#)	Year-end top-ten single position and rank
Entered	The date that the single first appeared in the chart.
Peak	Highest position that the single reached in the UK Singles Chart.

Entered (week ending)	Weeks in top 10	Single	Artist	Peak	Peak reached (week ending)	Weeks at peak
Singles in 1998
31 October 1998	12	"Believe" ‡	Cher	1	31 October 1998	7
21 November 1998	15	"Heartbeat"/"Tragedy"	Steps	1	9 January 1999	1
5 December 1998	4	"Miami" ‡ ^{[C]}	Will Smith	3	5 December 1998	1
12 December 1998	10	"When You're Gone" ‡	Bryan Adams featuring Melanie C	3	12 December 1998	1
19 December 1998	4	"To You I Belong" ‡	B*Witched	1	19 December 1998	1
19 December 1998	5	"End of the Line" ‡	Honeyz	5	19 December 1998	1
26 December 1998	4	"Goodbye" ‡	Spice Girls	1	26 December 1998	1
26 December 1998	5	"Chocolate Salty Balls"	Chef	1	2 January 1999	1
26 December 1998	3	"Especially for You" ‡ ^{[D]}	Denise & Johnny featuring Steps	3	26 December 1998	1
Singles in 1999
9 January 1999	1	"1999" ^{[E]}	Prince	10	9 January 1999	1
16 January 1999	3	"Praise You"	Fatboy Slim	1	16 January 1999	1
16 January 1999	2	"You Should Be..."	Blockster	3	16 January 1999	1
16 January 1999	1	"Rescue Me"	Ultra	8	16 January 1999	1
16 January 1999	1	"Up To the Wildstyle"	The Porn Kings vs. DJ Supreme	10	16 January 1999	1
23 January 1999	2	"A Little Bit More"	911	1	23 January 1999	1
23 January 1999	2	"I Want You For Myself"	Another Level	2	23 January 1999	1
23 January 1999	1	"More than This"	Emmie	5	23 January 1999	1
23 January 1999	1	"Cassius 1999"	Cassius	7	23 January 1999	1
23 January 1999	1	"Walk like a Panther"	All Seeing I featuring Tony Christie	10	23 January 1999	1
30 January 1999	5	"Pretty Fly (for a White Guy)"	The Offspring	1	30 January 1999	1
30 January 1999	2	"Tequila"	Terrorvision	2	30 January 1999	1
30 January 1999	3	"Westside"	TQ	4	30 January 1999	1
30 January 1999	1	"Gimme Some More"	Busta Rhymes	5	30 January 1999	1
30 January 1999	1	"To Earth with Love"	Gay Dad	10	30 January 1999	1
6 February 1999	3	"You Don't Know Me"	Armand van Helden featuring Duane Harden	1	6 February 1999	1
6 February 1999	2	"These Are the Times"	Dru Hill	4	6 February 1999	1
6 February 1999	1	"National Express"	The Divine Comedy	8	6 February 1999	1
6 February 1999	1	"When I Grow Up"	Garbage	9	6 February 1999	1
6 February 1999	1	"Good Life (Buena Vida)"	Inner City	10	6 February 1999	1
13 February 1999	3	"Maria"	Blondie	1	13 February 1999	1
13 February 1999	1	"Boy You Knock Me Out"	Tatyana Ali featuring Will Smith	3	13 February 1999	1
13 February 1999	2	"Enjoy Yourself"	A+	5	13 February 1999	1
13 February 1999	1	"Can't Get Enough"	Soulsearcher	8	13 February 1999	1
20 February 1999	3	"Fly Away"	Lenny Kravitz	1	20 February 1999	1
20 February 1999	2	"Changes"	2Pac	3	20 February 1999	1
20 February 1999	2	"Protect Your Mind (For the Love of a Princess)"	DJ Sakin & Friends	4	20 February 1999	1
20 February 1999	1	"One Week"	Barenaked Ladies	5	20 February 1999	1
20 February 1999	1	"Be There"	Unkle featuring Ian Brown	8	20 February 1999	1
27 February 1999	8	"...Baby One More Time" (#1)	Britney Spears	1	27 February 1999	2
27 February 1999	2	"Runaway"	The Corrs	2	27 February 1999	1
27 February 1999	1	"Ex-Factor"	Lauryn Hill	4	27 February 1999	1
27 February 1999	1	"I Want You Back"	NSYNC	5	27 February 1999	1
6 March 1999	4	"Tender"	Blur	2	6 March 1999	1
6 March 1999	4	"It's Not Right but It's Okay"	Whitney Houston	3	6 March 1999	1
6 March 1999	2	"Just Looking"	Stereophonics	4	6 March 1999	1
6 March 1999	3	"Strong Enough"	Cher	5	6 March 1999	1
6 March 1999	1	"Erase/Rewind"	The Cardigans	7	6 March 1999	1
6 March 1999	1	"Lullaby"	Shawn Mullins	9	6 March 1999	1
6 March 1999	1	"Written in the Stars"	Elton John & LeAnn Rimes	10	6 March 1999	1
13 March 1999	4	"When the Going Gets Tough" (#10) ^{[F]}	Boyzone	1	13 March 1999	2
13 March 1999	5	"We Like to Party!"	Vengaboys	3	13 March 1999	1
13 March 1999	2	"As"	George Michael & Mary J. Blige	4	13 March 1999	1
13 March 1999	1	"Nothing Really Matters"	Madonna	7	13 March 1999	1
13 March 1999	1	"What's So Different?"	Ginuwine	10	13 March 1999	1
20 March 1999	2	"Better Best Forgotten"	Steps	2	20 March 1999	1
20 March 1999	1	"You Stole the Sun from My Heart"	Manic Street Preachers	5	20 March 1999	1
20 March 1999	1	"At My Most Beautiful"	R.E.M.	10	20 March 1999	1
27 March 1999	2	"Blame It on the Weatherman"	B*Witched	1	27 March 1999	1
27 March 1999	1	"Strong"	Robbie Williams	4	27 March 1999	1
27 March 1999	1	"My Love"	Kele Le Roc	8	27 March 1999	1
27 March 1999	1	"Music to Watch Girls By"	Andy Williams	9	27 March 1999	1
3 April 1999	4	"Flat Beat" (#9)	Mr. Oizo	1	3 April 1999	2
3 April 1999	5	"Witch Doctor"	Cartoons	2	3 April 1999	1
3 April 1999	2	"Honey to the Bee"	Billie	3	3 April 1999	1
3 April 1999	4	"You Get What You Give"	New Radicals	5	3 April 1999	1
3 April 1999	8	"No Scrubs" ^{[G]}	TLC	3	8 May 1999	1
3 April 1999	1	"You Gotta Be (1999 Mix)"	Des'ree	10	3 April 1999	1
10 April 1999	3	"My Name Is"	Eminem	2	10 April 1999	1
10 April 1999	7	"Turn Around"	Phats & Small	2	24 April 1999	1
10 April 1999	3	"Thank ABBA for the Music" ^{[H]}	Steps, Tina Cousins, Cleopatra, B*Witched & Billie	4	10 April 1999	2
10 April 1999	1	"Dead from the Waist Down"	Catatonia	7	10 April 1999	1
17 April 1999	4	"Perfect Moment"	Martine McCutcheon	1	17 April 1999	2
17 April 1999	1	"Taboo"	Glamma Kid featuring Shola Ama	10	17 April 1999	1
24 April 1999	1	"Electricity"	Suede	5	24 April 1999	1
24 April 1999	1	"Love of a Lifetime"	Honeyz	9	24 April 1999	1
1 May 1999	4	"Swear It Again"	Westlife	1	1 May 1999	2
1 May 1999	3	"Right Here, Right Now"	Fatboy Slim	2	1 May 1999	1
1 May 1999	2	"In Our Lifetime"	Texas	4	1 May 1999	1
1 May 1999	3	"Red Alert"	Basement Jaxx	5	1 May 1999	1
1 May 1999	2	"What's It Gonna Be?!"	Busta Rhymes featuring Janet Jackson	6	1 May 1999	1
1 May 1999	1	"Bye Bye Baby"	TQ	7	1 May 1999	1
8 May 1999	2	"Why Don't You Get a Job?"	The Offspring	2	8 May 1999	1
8 May 1999	1	"Beat Mama"	Cast	9	8 May 1999	1
15 May 1999	6	"I Want It That Way"	Backstreet Boys	1	15 May 1999	1
15 May 1999	2	"Private Number"	911	3	15 May 1999	1
15 May 1999	2	"Pick a Part That's New"	Stereophonics	4	15 May 1999	1
15 May 1999	2	"Cloud Number Nine"	Bryan Adams	6	15 May 1999	1
22 May 1999	3	"You Needed Me"	Boyzone	1	22 May 1999	1
22 May 1999	3	"Look at Me"	Geri Halliwell	2	22 May 1999	1
22 May 1999	10	"That Don't Impress Me Much" (#7)	Shania Twain	3	22 May 1999	3
29 May 1999	5	"Sweet Like Chocolate" (#8)	Shanks & Bigfoot	1	29 May 1999	2
29 May 1999	4	"Kiss Me"	Sixpence None the Richer	4	29 May 1999	1
29 May 1999	2	"Say It Again" ^{[I]}	Precious	6	29 May 1999	1
29 May 1999	1	"I Quit"	Hepburn	8	29 May 1999	1
29 May 1999	1	"Every Morning"	Sugar Ray	10	29 May 1999	1
5 June 1999	3	"Ooh La La"	The Wiseguys	2	5 June 1999	1
5 June 1999	2	"Canned Heat"	Jamiroquai	4	5 June 1999	1
5 June 1999	2	"Saltwater"	Chicane featuring Maire Brennan	6	5 June 1999	1
12 June 1999	3	"Everybody's Free (To Wear Sunscreen)"	Baz Luhrmann	1	12 June 1999	1
12 June 1999	3	"Hey Boy Hey Girl"	The Chemical Brothers	3	12 June 1999	1
12 June 1999	1	"From the Heart"	Another Level	6	12 June 1999	1
19 June 1999	5	"Bring It All Back"	S Club 7	1	19 June 1999	1
19 June 1999	5	"Beautiful Stranger"	Madonna	2	19 June 1999	1
19 June 1999	1	"DooDah!"	Cartoons	7	19 June 1999	1
26 June 1999	7	"Boom, Boom, Boom, Boom!!"	Vengaboys	1	26 June 1999	1
26 June 1999	5	"Sometimes"	Britney Spears	3	26 June 1999	1
26 June 1999	2	"I Breathe Again"	Adam Rickitt	5	26 June 1999	1
26 June 1999	1	"Tearin' Up My Heart"	NSYNC	9	26 June 1999	1
3 July 1999	6	"9 PM (Till I Come)" (#5)	ATB	1	3 July 1999	2
3 July 1999	7	"My Love Is Your Love" ^{[J]}	Whitney Houston	2	3 July 1999	1
3 July 1999	3	"If You Had My Love"	Jennifer Lopez	4	3 July 1999	1
3 July 1999	1	"Be the First to Believe"	A1	6	3 July 1999	1
10 July 1999	8	"Wild Wild West"	Will Smith featuring Dru Hill & Kool Moe Dee	2	10 July 1999	1
10 July 1999	1	"Viva La Radio"	Lolly	7	10 July 1999	1
17 July 1999	8	"Livin' la Vida Loca" (#6)	Ricky Martin	1	17 July 1999	3
24 July 1999	3	"Love's Got a Hold on My Heart"	Steps	2	24 July 1999	1
24 July 1999	1	"Bills, Bills, Bills"	Destiny's Child	6	24 July 1999	1
24 July 1999	2	"Synth & Strings"	Yomanda	8	24 July 1999	1
31 July 1999	4	"If Ya Gettin' Down"	Five	2	31 July 1999	1
31 July 1999	7	"Better Off Alone"	Alice Deejay	2	14 August 1999	3
31 July 1999	1	"Lovestruck"	Madness	10	31 July 1999	1
7 August 1999	4	"When You Say Nothing at All"	Ronan Keating	1	7 August 1999	2
7 August 1999	1	"Straight from the Heart" ^{[K]}	Doolally ^{[L]}	9	7 August 1999	1
14 August 1999	2	"Rendez-Vu"	Basement Jaxx	4	14 August 1999	1
14 August 1999	2	"Guilty Conscience"	Eminem featuring Dr. Dre	5	14 August 1999	1
14 August 1999	1	"Feel Good"	Phats & Small	7	14 August 1999	1
14 August 1999	1	"Let Forever Be"	The Chemical Brothers	9	14 August 1999	1
14 August 1999	1	"Why Does It Always Rain on Me?"	Travis	10	14 August 1999	1
21 August 1999	3	"If I Let You Go"	Westlife	1	21 August 1999	1
21 August 1999	3	"Drinking in L.A."	Bran Van 3000	3	21 August 1999	1
28 August 1999	3	"Mi Chico Latino"	Geri Halliwell	1	28 August 1999	1
28 August 1999	1	"Summer Son"	Texas	5	28 August 1999	1
28 August 1999	3	"Unpretty"	TLC	6	28 August 1999	1
28 August 1999	1	"Stop the Rock"	Apollo 440	10	28 August 1999	1
4 September 1999	7	"Mambo No. 5 (A Little Bit of...)" (#4)	Lou Bega	1	4 September 1999	2
4 September 1999	4	"(Mucho Mambo) Sway"	Shaft	2	4 September 1999	1
4 September 1999	2	"Sing It Back"	Moloko	4	4 September 1999	1
4 September 1999	1	"Summertime"	Another Level featuring TQ	7	4 September 1999	1
11 September 1999	4	"The Launch"	DJ Jean	2	11 September 1999	1
11 September 1999	3	"Bailamos"	Enrique Iglesias	4	11 September 1999	1
11 September 1999	1	"Summertime of Our Lives"	A1	5	11 September 1999	1
11 September 1999	2	"I've Got You"	Martine McCutcheon	6	11 September 1999	1
18 September 1999	4	"We're Going to Ibiza"	Vengaboys	1	18 September 1999	1
18 September 1999	3	"Mickey"	Lolly	4	18 September 1999	1
18 September 1999	1	"Friends Forever"	Thunderbugs	5	18 September 1999	1
18 September 1999	1	"Afrika Shox"	Leftfield featuring Afrika Bambaataa	7	18 September 1999	1
18 September 1999	1	"Moving"	Supergrass	9	18 September 1999	1
25 September 1999	7	"Blue (Da Ba Dee)" (#2)	Eiffel 65	1	25 September 1999	3
25 September 1999	3	"Sun Is Shining"	Bob Marley vs. Funkstar De Luxe	3	25 September 1999	1
25 September 1999	2	"Get Get Down"	Paul Johnson	5	25 September 1999	1
25 September 1999	1	"Burning Down the House"	Tom Jones & The Cardigans	7	25 September 1999	1
2 October 1999	3	"S Club Party"	S Club 7	2	2 October 1999	2
2 October 1999	4	"Man! I Feel Like a Woman!"	Shania Twain	3	2 October 1999	2
2 October 1999	3	"(You Drive Me) Crazy"	Britney Spears	5	2 October 1999	1
9 October 1999	1	"Goin' Down"	Melanie C	4	9 October 1999	1
9 October 1999	1	"Sunshine"	Gabrielle	9	9 October 1999	1
9 October 1999	9	"I Try"	Macy Gray	6	27 November 1999	1
16 October 1999	5	"Genie in a Bottle"	Christina Aguilera	1	16 October 1999	2
16 October 1999	4	"2 Times"	Ann Lee	2	16 October 1999	2
16 October 1999	2	"Jesse Hold On"	B*Witched	4	16 October 1999	1
16 October 1999	1	"Give It to You"	Jordan Knight	5	16 October 1999	1
23 October 1999	2	"Don't Stop!"	ATB	3	23 October 1999	1
23 October 1999	1	"After the Love Has Gone"	Steps	5	23 October 1999	1
23 October 1999	1	"Going Underground"/"Carnation"	Buffalo Tom/Liam Gallagher & Steve Cradock	6	23 October 1999	1
23 October 1999	1	"Never Let You Down"	Honeyz	7	23 October 1999	1
30 October 1999	3	"Flying Without Wings"	Westlife	1	30 October 1999	1
30 October 1999	8	"If I Could Turn Back the Hands of Time"	R. Kelly	2	6 November 1999	1
30 October 1999	2	"Larger Than Life"	Backstreet Boys	5	30 October 1999	1
30 October 1999	1	"Bug a Boo"	Destiny's Child	9	30 October 1999	1
30 October 1999	1	"When the Heartache Is Over"	Tina Turner	10	30 October 1999	1
6 November 1999	4	"Keep On Movin'"	Five	1	6 November 1999	1
6 November 1999	1	"Heartbreaker"	Mariah Carey featuring Jay-Z	5	6 November 1999	1
6 November 1999	1	"Not Over You Yet"	Diana Ross	9	6 November 1999	1
13 November 1999	3	"Lift Me Up"	Geri Halliwell	1	13 November 1999	1
13 November 1999	2	"What I Am"	Tin Tin Out featuring Emma Bunton	2	13 November 1999	1
13 November 1999	2	"Waiting for Tonight"	Jennifer Lopez	5	13 November 1999	1
13 November 1999	1	"Bomb Diggy"	Another Level	6	13 November 1999	1
13 November 1999	1	"I Knew I Loved You"	Savage Garden	10	13 November 1999	1
20 November 1999	3	"She's the One"/"It's Only Us"	Robbie Williams	1	20 November 1999	1
20 November 1999	2	"Will 2K"	Will Smith featuring K-Ci	2	20 November 1999	1
20 November 1999	2	"Ready or Not"/"Everytime"	A1	3	20 November 1999	1
20 November 1999	1	"Turn"	Travis	8	20 November 1999	1
27 November 1999	4	"King of My Castle"	Wamdue Project	1	27 November 1999	1
27 November 1999	7	"The Millennium Prayer" (#3)	Cliff Richard	1	4 December 1999	3
27 November 1999	1	"Why"	Glamma Kid	10	27 November 1999	1
4 December 1999	3	"Every Day I Love You"	Boyzone	3	4 December 1999	1
4 December 1999	2	"Northern Star"	Melanie C	4	4 December 1999	1
4 December 1999	7	"Back in My Life" ^{[M]}	Alice Deejay	4	11 December 1999	1
4 December 1999	2	"Talking In Your Sleep"/"Love Me" ^{[N]}	Martine McCutcheon	6	4 December 1999	1
4 December 1999	1	"Big Boys Don't Cry"/"Rockin' Robin"	Lolly	10	4 December 1999	1
11 December 1999	8	"Re-Rewind (The Crowd Say Bo Selecta)"	Artful Dodger featuring Craig David	2	11 December 1999	3
11 December 1999	1	"Communication (Somebody Answer the Phone)"	Mario Più	5	11 December 1999	1
11 December 1999	1	"Right Now"	Atomic Kitten	10	11 December 1999	1
18 December 1999	5	"Kiss (When the Sun Don't Shine)"	Vengaboys	3	18 December 1999	1
18 December 1999	4	"Barber's Adagio for Strings" ^{[O]}	William Orbit	4	18 December 1999	1
18 December 1999	1	"Everybody"	Progress presents The Boy Wunda	7	18 December 1999	1
18 December 1999	3	"Steal My Sunshine" ^{[P]}	Len	8	18 December 1999	1
25 December 1999	6	"I Have a Dream"/"Seasons in the Sun"	Westlife	1	25 December 1999	4
25 December 1999	4	"Imagine" ^{[Q]}	John Lennon	3	25 December 1999	2
25 December 1999	3	"Cognoscenti vs. Intelligentsia"	Cuban Boys	4	25 December 1999	1
25 December 1999	5	"Two in a Million"/"You're My Number One" ♦	S Club 7	2	8 January 2000	1
25 December 1999	4	"Say You'll Be Mine"/"Better the Devil You Know" ♦	Steps	4	8 January 2000	2
25 December 1999	3	"Mr. Hankey, the Christmas Poo" ♦	Mr. Hankey	4	1 January 2000	1

== Entries by artist ==
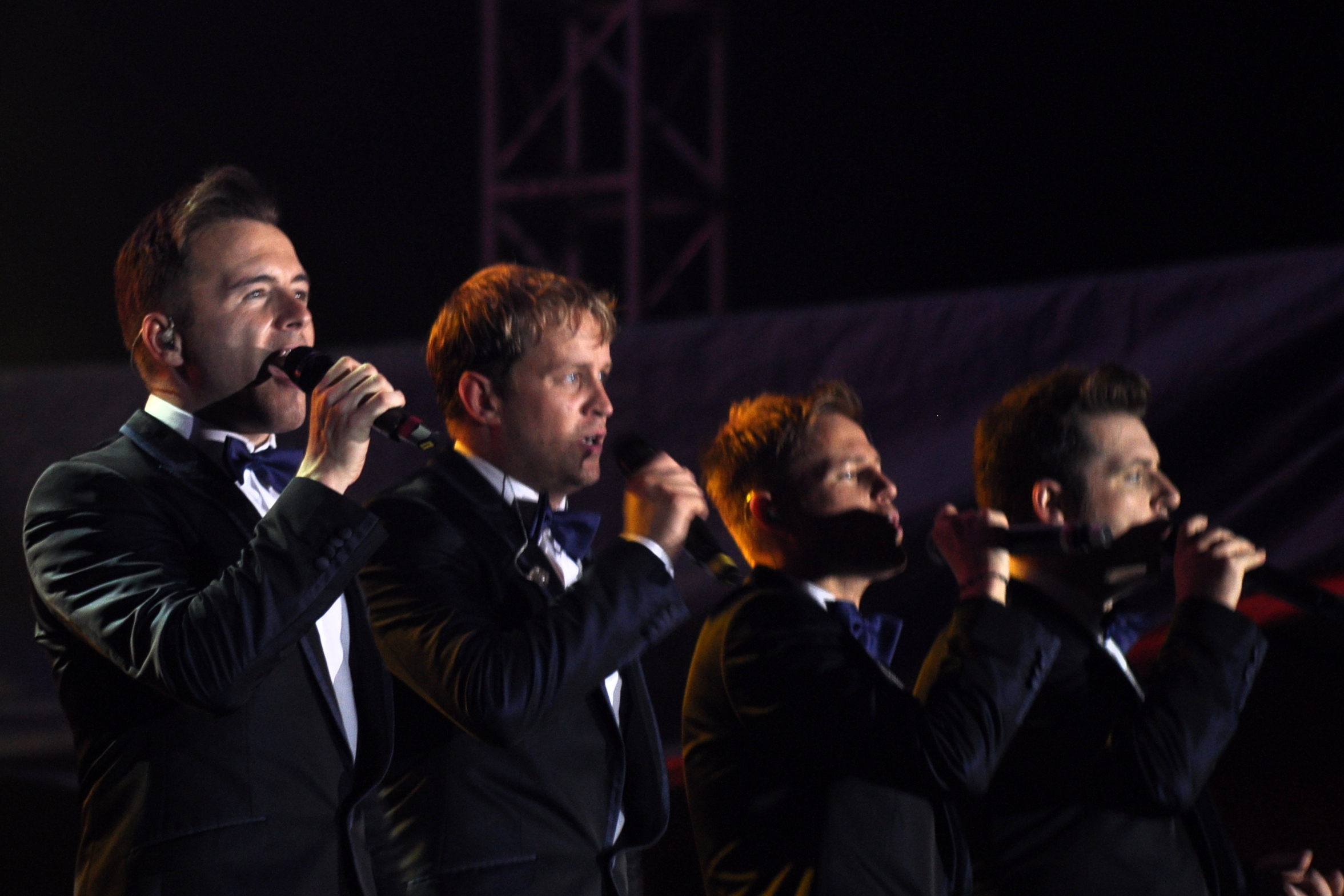
Irish boy band Westlife (pictured in 2011 without original member Brian McFadden) made their UK chart debut in 1999 by scoring five consecutive number-one hits: "Swear It Again", "If I Let You Go", fool again"Flying Without Wings" and "I Have a Dream"/"Seasons in the Sun".

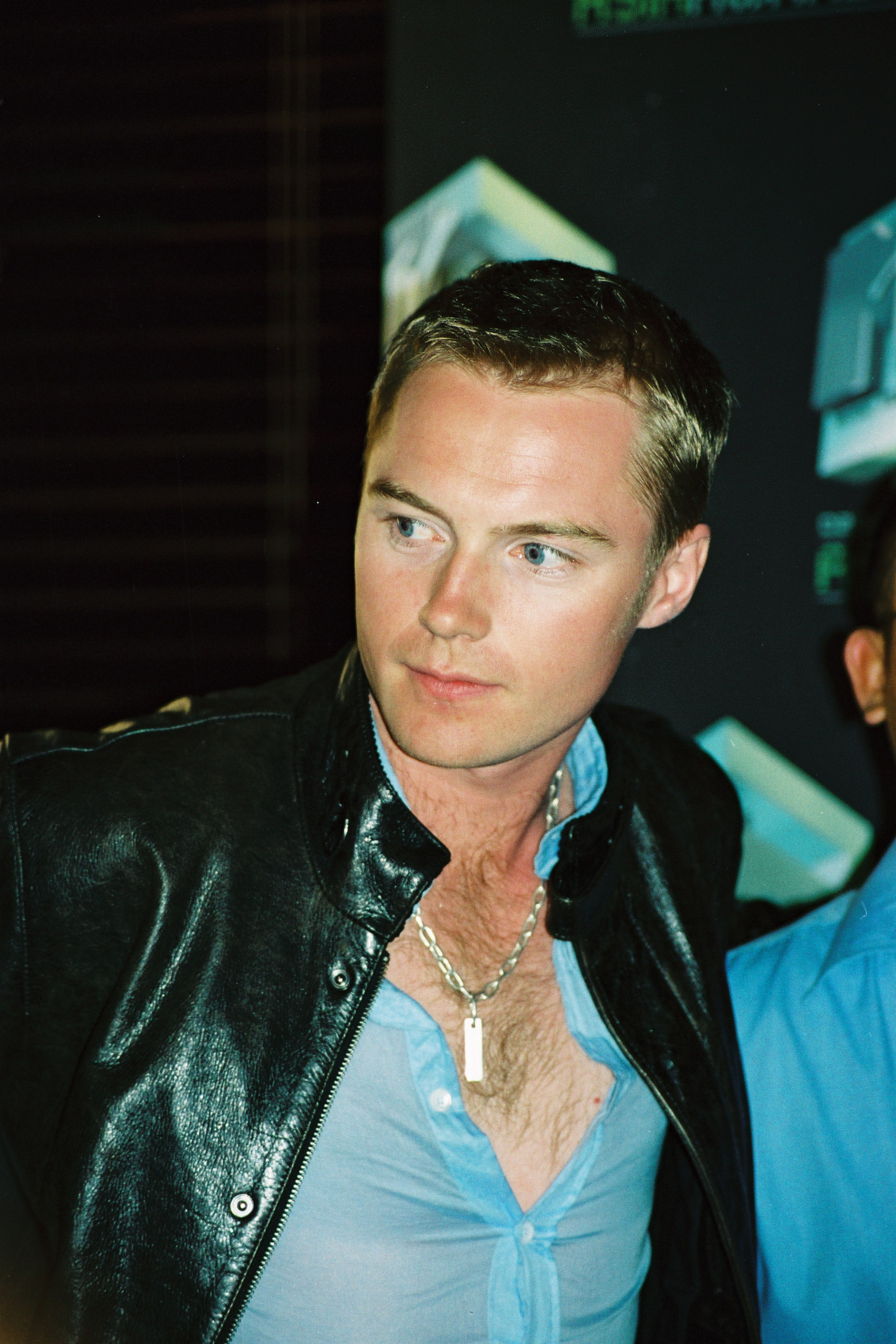
Ronan Keating made the UK top 10 four times in 1999. With Boyzone, he reached number-one with "When the Going Gets Tough" and "You Needed Me", while he topped the chart on his own with his first solo single, a cover of "When You Say Nothing at All", which featured on the soundtrack of the movie Notting Hill.

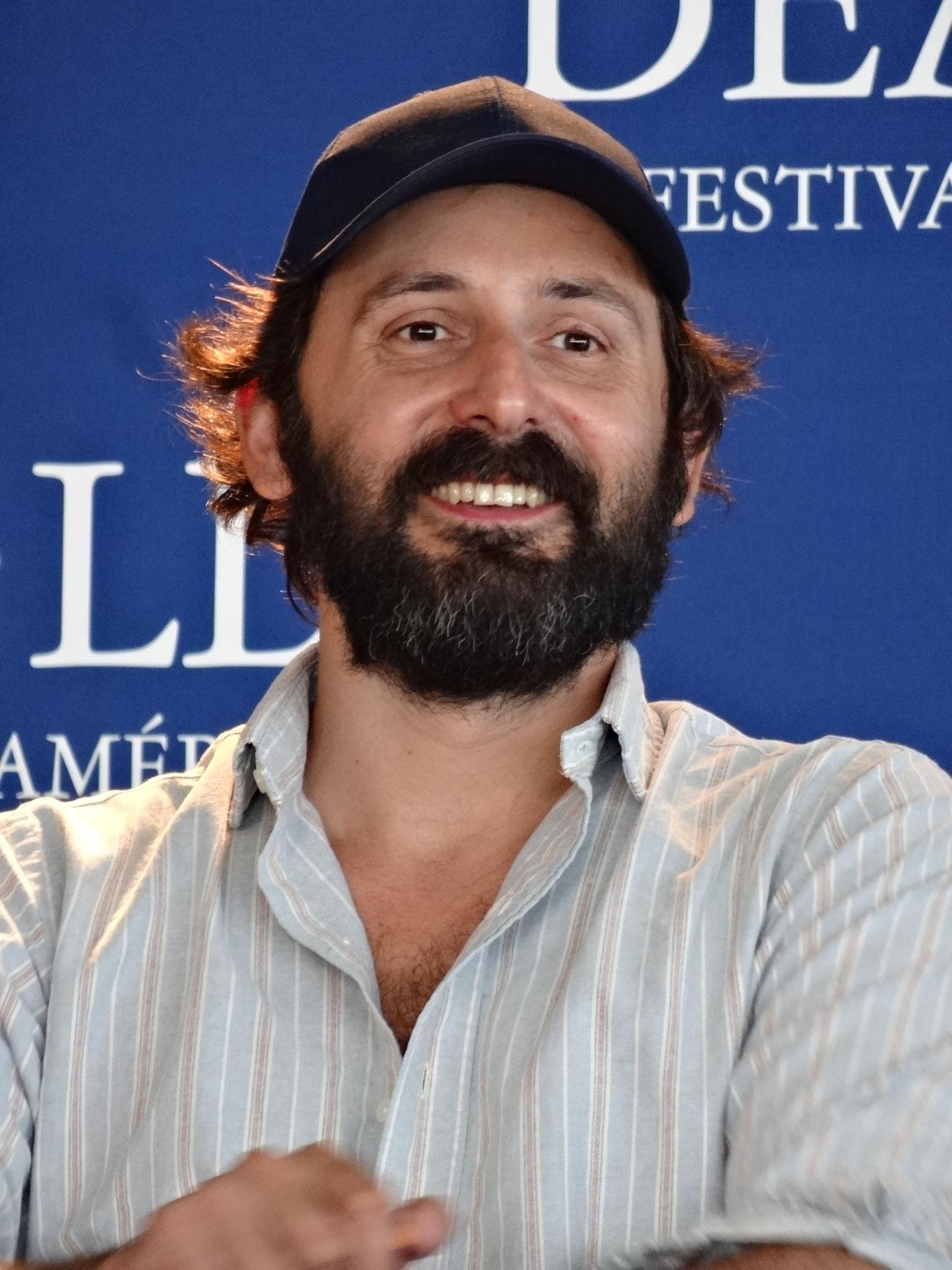
French DJ and musician Mr. Oizo secured a UK number-one hit this year with his instrumental "Flat Beat", which achieved success after featuring in an advert for clothing company Levi's.

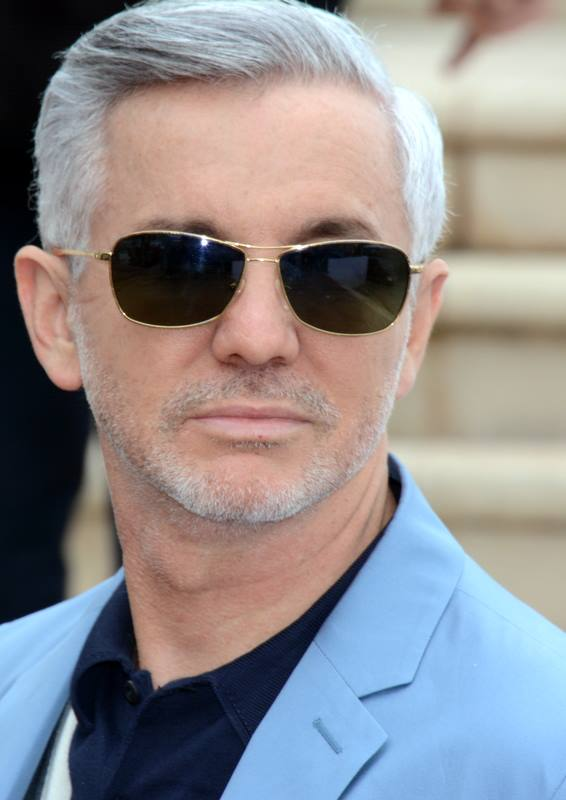
Australian film director and music producer Baz Luhrmann reached number-one in June 1999 with his spoken word song "Everybody's Free (To Wear Sunscreen)", with uncredited narration provided by Australian actor Lee Perry.

The following table shows artists who achieved two or more top 10 entries in 1999, including singles that reached their peak in 1998 or 2000. The figures include both main artists and featured artists, while appearances on ensemble charity records are also counted for each artist.

Entries	Artist	Weeks	Singles
7	Steps ^{[R]} ^{[S]} ^{[T]} ^{[V]}	18	"After the Love Has Gone", "Better Best Forgotten", "Especially for You", "Heartbeat"/"Tragedy", "Love's Got a Hold on My Heart", "Say You'll Be Mine"/"Better the Devil You Know", "Thank ABBA for the Music"
4	Another Level	8	"Bomb Diggy", "From the Heart", ""I Want You for Myself", "Summertime"
4	B*Witched ^{[T]} ^{[U]}	9	"Blame It on the Weatherman", "Jesse Hold On", "Thank ABBA for the Music", "To You I Belong"
4	Melanie C ^{[U]} ^{[W]} ^{[X]}	13	"Goin' Down", "Goodbye", "Northern Star", "When You're Gone"
4	Ronan Keating ^{[Y]}	14	"Every Day I Love You", "When the Going Gets Tough", "When You Say Nothing at All", "You Needed Me",
4	Vengaboys	18	"Boom, Boom, Boom, Boom!!", "Kiss (When the Sun Don't Shine)", "We Like to Party!", "We're Going to Ibiza"
4	Westlife	11	"Flying Without Wings", "If I Let You Go", "I Have a Dream"/"Seasons in the Sun", "Swear It Again"
4	Will Smith ^{[Z]}	13	"Boy You Knock Me Out", "Miami", "Wild Wild West", "Will 2K"
3	A1	4	"Be the First to Believe", "Ready or Not"/"Everytime", "Summertime of Our Lives"
3	Boyzone	10	"Every Day I Love You", "When the Going Gets Tough", "You Needed Me"
3	Britney Spears	16	"...Baby One More Time", "Sometimes", "(You Drive Me) Crazy"
3	Geri Halliwell ^{[W]}	9	"Lift Me Up", "Look at Me", "Mi Chico Latino"
3	Honeyz	5	"End of the Line", "Love of a Lifetime", "Never Let You Down"
3	Lolly	5	"Big Boys Don't Cry (Rockin' Robin)", "Mickey", "Viva La Radio"
3	Martine McCutcheon	8	"I've Got You", "Perfect Moment", "Talking in Your Sleep"/"Love Me"
3	S Club 7 ^{[V]}	12	"Bring It All Back", "S Club Party", "Two in a Million"/"You're My Number One"
3	TQ ^{[AA]}	5	"Bye Bye Baby", "Summertime", "Westside"
2	911	4	"A Little Bit More", "Private Number"
2	Alice Deejay	10	"Back in My Life", "Better Off Alone"
2	ATB	8	"9PM (Till I Come)", "Don't Stop!"
2	Backstreet Boys	8	"I Want It That Way", "Larger Than Life"
2	Basement Jaxx	5	"Red Alert", "Rendez-Vu"
2	Billie ^{[T]}	5	"Honey to the Bee", "Thank ABBA for the Music"
2	Bryan Adams ^{[U]}	9	"Cloud Number Nine", "When You're Gone"
2	Busta Rhymes	3	"Gimme Some More", "What's It Gonna Be"
2	The Cardigans	2	"Burning Down the House", "Erase/Rewind"
2	Cartoons	6	"DooDah!", "Witch Doctor"
2	The Chemical Brothers	4	"Hey Boy Hey Girl", "Let Forever Be"
2	Cher ^{[U]}	6	"Believe", "Strong Enough"
2	Destiny's Child	2	"Bills, Bills, Bills", "Bug a Boo"
2	Dru Hill ^{[BB]}	10	"These Are the Times", "Wild Wild West"
2	Emma Bunton ^{[W]} ^{[CC]}	5	"Goodbye", "What I Am"
2	Eminem	5	"Guilty Conscience", "My Name Is"
2	Fatboy Slim	6	"Praise You", "Right Here, Right Now"
2	Five	8	"If Ya Gettin' Down", "Keep On Movin'"
2	Glamma Kid	2	"Taboo", "Why?"
2	Jennifer Lopez	5	"If You Had My Love", "Waiting for Tonight"
2	Madonna	6	"Beautiful Stranger", "Nothing Really Matters"
2	NSYNC	2	"I Want You Back", "Tearin' Up My Heart"
2	The Offspring	7	"Pretty Fly (for a White Guy)", "Why Don't You Get a Job?"
2	Phats & Small	8	"Feel Good", "Turn Around"
2	Robbie Williams	4	"She's the One"/"It's Only Us", "Strong"
2	Shania Twain	14	"Man! I Feel Like a Woman!", "That Don't Impress Me Much"
2	Shanks & Bigfoot	6	"Straight from the Heart" (as Doolally), "Sweet Like Chocolate"
2	Stereophonics	4	"Just Looking", "Pick a Part That's New"
2	Texas	3	"In Our Lifetime", "Summer Son"
2	TLC	11	"No Scrubs", "Unpretty"
2	Whitney Houston	11	"It's Not Right but It's Okay", "My Love Is Your Love"

== Notes ==
- ^{a} "Two in a Million"/"You're My Number One" reached its peak of number two on 8 January 2000.
- ^{b} "Mr. Hankey, the Christmas Poo" reached its peak of number four on 1 January 2000.
- ^{c} "Miami" re-entered the top 10 at number 9 on 2 January 1999 (week ending).
- ^{d} Released as the official single for Children in Need in 1998.
- ^{e} "1999" originally peaked outside the top 10 at number 25 upon its initial release in 1983. It was re-released in 1985, and made the top 10 for the first time, peaking at number 2.
- ^{f} Released as the official single for Comic Relief.
- ^{g} "No Scrubs" re-entered the top 10 at number 8 on 17 April 1999 (week ending).
- ^{h} "Thank ABBA for the Music" was a medley of ABBA songs first performed at the 1999 BRIT Awards to celebrate the release of the Mamma Mia musical. It featured the groups B*Witched, Cleopatra and Steps and solo artists Billie and Tina Cousins.
- ^{i} "Say It Again" was the United Kingdom's entry at the Eurovision Song Contest in 1999.
- ^{j} "My Love Is Your Love" re-entered the top 10 at number 10 on 21 August 1999 (week ending).
- ^{k} "Straight From the Heart" originally peaked at number 20 upon its initial release in 1998.
- ^{l} "Straight from the Heart" is credited to Doolally, the original name by which Shanks & Bigfoot were known. "Sweet Like Chocolate" entered the top 10 under their new name.
- ^{m} "Back In My Life" re-entered the top 10 at number 10 on 1 January 2000 (week ending).
- ^{n} Released as the official single for Children in Need.
- ^{o} "Barber's Adagio For Strings" re-entered the top 10 at number 7 on 15 January 2000 (week ending).
- ^{p} "Steal My Sunshine" re-entered the top 10 at number 9 on 15 January 2000 (week ending).
- ^{q} "Imagine" was first released as a single in the UK in 1975 and made the top 10, peaking at number 6. Following John Lennon's death in December 1980, it re-entered the top 10 and spent four weeks at number one in January 1981.
- ^{r} Figure includes song that first charted in 1998 but peaked in 1999.
- ^{s} Figure includes appearance on Denise & Johnny's "Especially for You".
- ^{t} Figure includes an appearance on the group medley single "Thank ABBA for the Music".
- ^{u} Figure includes song that peaked in 1998.
- ^{v} Figure includes song that peaked in 2000.
- ^{w} Figure includes a top 10 hit with the group Spice Girls.
- ^{x} Figure includes appearance on Bryan Adams' "When You're Gone".
- ^{y} Figure includes three top 10 hits with the group Boyzone.
- ^{z} Figure includes appearance on Tatyana Ali's "Boy You Knock Me Out".
- ^{aa} Figure includes appearance on Another Level's "Summertime".
- ^{bb} Figure includes appearance on Will Smith's "Wild Wild West".
- ^{cc} Figure includes appearance on Tin Tin Out's "What I Am".

== See also ==
- 1999 in British music
- List of number-one singles from the 1990s (UK)
