= Paul Marazzi =

British singer (born 1975)

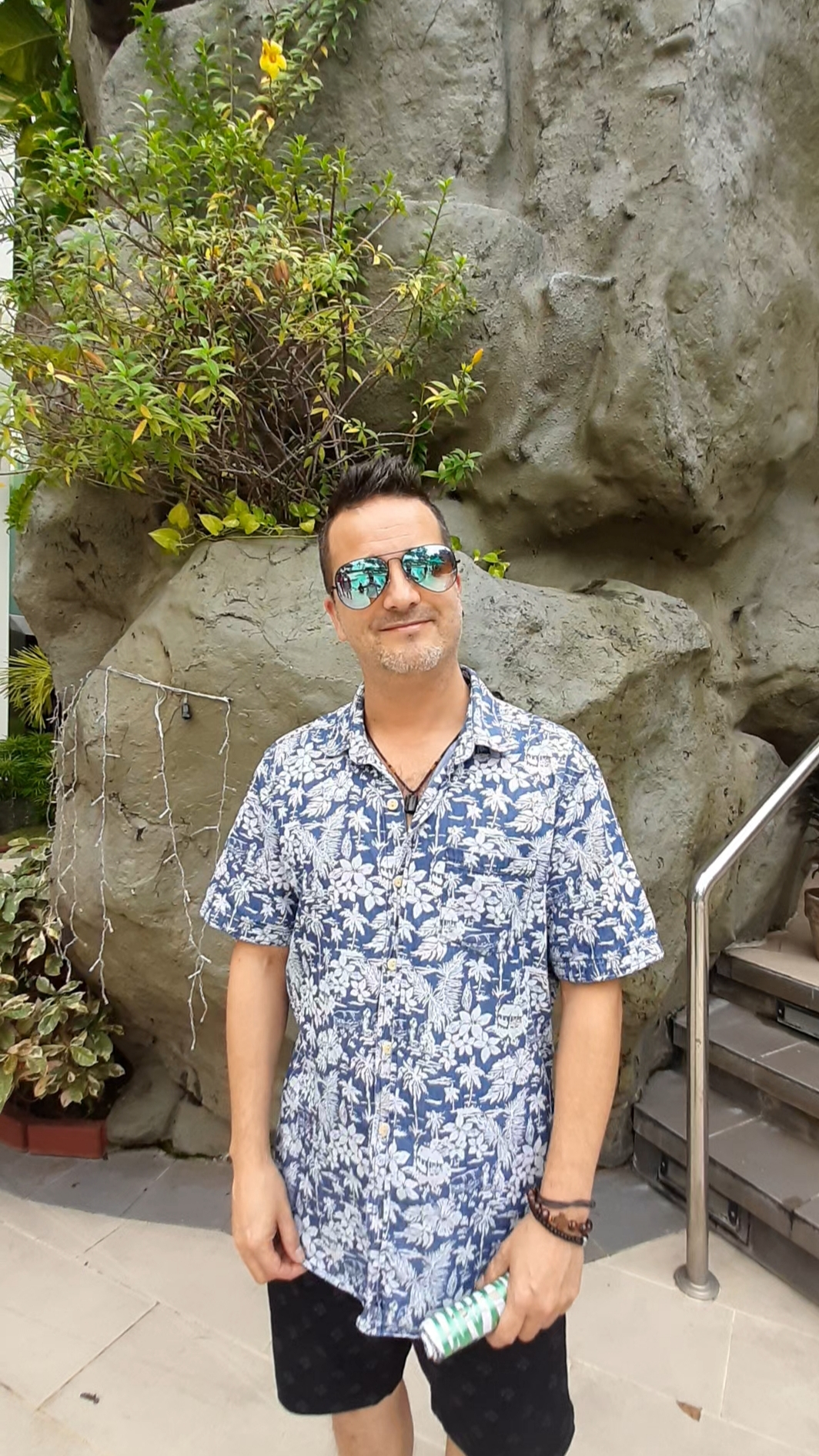
- Marazzi in 2019

Background information
- Also known as: Funk a1, the Iron Fist
- Born: Paul Thomas Leo Marazzi; 24 January 1975 (age 51); Wanstead, London, England,
- Genres: Pop, pop rock
- Occupations: Singer, songwriter
- Years active: 1997–present
- Labels: Columbia; Sony BMG; Major
- Member of: A1
- Formerly of: Snagsby
- Spouse: Shareen Marazzi (1990–2009)

Paul Thomas Leo Marazzi (born 24 January 1975) is an English musician. He is the oldest member of the boy band A1. Marazzi was the first to join A1, a British/Norwegian boy band whose first single, "Be the First to Believe", was released in 1999. Together with Marazzi were fellow Britons Mark Read, Ben Adams, and Norwegian Christian Ingebrigtsen. They were formed by band manager Tim Byrne, who also formed Steps, and signed to Columbia Records by A&R manager Fran de Takats. A1 won a BRIT Award for British Breakthrough Act in 2001. Their third album, Make It Good, featured a sound closer to traditional rock music, but was to be their last studio project with Marazzi.

In October 2002, Marazzi took a break from the band citing personal reasons. Marazzi never gave a proper explanation on why he left the band, making fans wonder. In 2005, he started a band called Snagsby. He left Snagsby in January 2009 to pursue a career as a club DJ in The George Hotel in Whitby.

== Early life ==
Marazzi was born on 24 January 1975 in Wanstead, London, to Ivan and Maria Marazzi. He has a sister, Shareen Marazzi, and a nephew, Kalum Marazzi Ross. He is of Italian descent. Marazzi went to Spain with his family and lived there until 2007. He recorded a demo for a German producer which led him to audition for A1 in 1997.

== Career ==
=== A1 ===
Marazzi said that he originally auditioned for Steps, Mayhem and Knocked Loose, however, he was placed in A1 in 1997. He was then later joined by Christian Ingebrigtsen, Mark Read and Ben Adams. They released their first album Here We Come in late 1999. Two years after their first single release, in the 2001 BRIT Awards the band received the award for Best British Breakthrough. In 2002, a few months after their appearance in the US soap The Young and the Restless, Marazzi then announced his departure from A1 with a statement that read: "After a lot of thought and deliberation, I have made the difficult choice to leave the band due to personal reasons." In an interview on YouTube, Marazzi stated he left the band as he knew their Make It Good album was not that great, and that he might as well jump off the sinking ship.

He later stated to an undisclosed family member that the other members of A1 began recording in the studio without him which severely upset him causing his abrupt exit from the band.

=== Post A1 ===
After A1, Marazzi hosted the Andy Cole Children's Foundation (now All Star Kids) on 26 April 2003 together with Jo Good. He turned down an offer to appear in I'm a Celebrity... Get Me out of Here! in 2004. In mid-2005, Marazzi was interviewed in Spain for Fame Games where he talked about life being in A1. The interview was aired on 31 July 2006 and also played (partly) two of his unreleased songs, namely "If I Could Be King" and "Lifted". Marazzi also revealed that he would be touring Germany with the Spencer Davis Group.

In late 2011, Marazzi was rehearsing/recording with Nobby in his previous band's (Snagsby now known as Audio Tracer) studio in Sunderland and had formed a new band called Blue Eyed Soul. His father announced the news to his fans on Facebook. Just recently, he just become a Patron for MACY (Music and Arts for Creative Youth).

In August 2009, A1 reunited as a trio in Norway for a TV show after Marazzi refused to rejoin the band. In 2013, he was invited to take part in The Big Reunion with A1 but Marazzi refused to rejoin again as he wanted to meet up in private instead. Marazzi made a tweet attacking the band prior to the series; it was after a misunderstanding between him and the band.

He later released a song called "Eleven Years" which states how he really feels about the band. The song was officially released on 25 March 2014 on iTunes. Another song was planned to be released with an accompanying video and was already recorded, but Marazzi later shelved the idea as he prefers live singing.

On 30 November 2014, while A1 was performing in Newcastle for the Big Reunion Boyband Tour, Marazzi tweeted to ask everyone to stop saying nasty things about his ex-bandmates. This would make people wonder if they have patched things up. With this tweet it was presumed that he just wanted A1 fans (old and new) to be quiet and to leave him alone.

Marazzi worked as a cabinet maker based in Northumberland, and sang part-time with a wedding band called Hip Operations. Marazzi joined after his stint with the band for It's a Disco Night in late 2012. He also worked with the Overtones, Damage, S Club, and 5ive.

=== Reunion with A1 ===
On 22 July 2017, Marazzi met with his former bandmates in Newcastle and discussed possibilities of a reunion. The meeting was kept secret until Ben Adams posted a photo of him and Marazzi taken in Sunderland in September that same year. The band later on revealed that a reunion with Marazzi was happening upon the announcement of their Southeast Asian Tour in October 2018.

== Musical influences ==
Marazzi is a fan of Prince. On the official website of Snagsby as well as on his Facebook page, he stated that he is also a fan of Shakin' Stevens, Lenny Kravitz, Red Hot Chili Peppers, George Michael and Michael Jackson.

== Discography ==
=== Albums ===
- Here We Come (1999)
- The A List (2000)
- Make It Good (2002)
- The Best of A1 (2004)
- A1 Greatest Hits (2009)

=== Singles ===
- "Be the First to Believe" (1999)
- "Summertime of Our Lives" (1999)
- "Ready or Not/Everytime" (1999)
- "Like a Rose" (2000)
- "Take On Me" (2000)
- "Same Old Brand New You" (2000)
- "No More" (2001)
- "Caught in the Middle" (2002)
- "Make It Good" (2002)
- "Nos Differences" (2002)

=== Solo ===
- Eleven Years (featuring Rockwool Sari)
