= The Best of A1 =

Greatest hits album by A1
- Released: 9 August 2004
- Recorded: 1998–2002
- Genre: Pop
- Length: 90:13
- Label: Sony BMG
- Producer: Various

A1 chronology
Make It Good (2002)	The Best of A1 (2004)	Greatest Hits (2009)

The Best of A1 is the first compilation album by British-Norwegian boyband A1. The album was released on 9 August 2004 exclusively in Asia. The album contained two discs, the first comprising eighteen audio tracks, and the second with seven live performances. The album contained six postcards, and was packaged in a cardboard slipcase.

== Track listing ==
Disc one (CD)
No.	Title	Writer(s)	Length
1.	"Caught in the Middle"	Adams, Marazzi, Mitra, Porter	3:27
2.	"Everytime"	Adams, Ingebrigtsen, Read	4:30
3.	"Take On Me"	Furuholmen, Harket, Waaktaar	3:34
4.	"Living the Dream"	Cunnah, Nichols	3:56
5.	"Same Old Brand New You"	Adams, Ingebrigtsen, Read, White	4:15
6.	"No More"	Bensusen, Cueni, Robbins, Sharpe	3:39
7.	"Like a Rose"	Steve Mac, Wayne Hector, Adams	4:13
8.	"One More Try"	Ingebrigtsen, Adams, Marazzi, Read	3:29
9.	"When I'm Missing You"	Adams, Ingebrigtsen, Read, Marazzi, Woodcock, Lever	3:29
10.	"Ready or Not"	Adams, Cunnah, Ingebrigtsen, Marazzi	3:54
11.	"Learn to Fly"	Gordeno, Ingebrigtsen, Mitra, Porter	4:12
12.	"Make It Good"	Ingebrigtsen, Read	3:38
13.	"Three Times a Lady"	Richie	3:38
14.	"Here Comes the Rain"	Porter, Marazzi, Ingebrigtsen	4:34
15.	"Heaven by Your Side"	Adams, Ingebrigtsen, Marazzi	4:25
16.	"Summertime of Our Lives"	Adams, Cunnah, Ingebrigtsen, Marazzi	3:23
17.	"High and Dry"	Marazzi, Terry Adams, Chesney Hawkes	4:09
18.	"Do It Again"	Ingebrigtsen, Marazzi	3:53
Total length:			70:12

Disc two (VCD: Live Performance in Thailand)
No.	Title	Writer(s)	Length
1.	"Make It Good"	Ingebrigtsen, Read	4:01
2.	"Same Old Brand New You"	Adams, Ingebrigtsen, Read, White	4:35
3.	"When I'm Missing You"	Adams, Ingebrigtsen, Read, Marazzi, Woodcock, Lever	5:03
4.	"Learn to Fly"	Gordeno, Ingebrigtsen, Mitra, Porter	3:18
5.	"One More Try"	Ingebrigtsen, Adams, Marazzi, Read	3:22
6.	"Living the Dream"	Cunnah, Nichols	4:12
7.	"Caught in the Middle"	Adams, Marazzi, Mitra, Porter	4:21

The Best of A1: Philippines tour edition
No.	Title	Writer(s)	Length
1.	"Heaven by Your Side"	Adams, Ingebrigtsen, Marazzi	4:25
2.	"Crazy for Leaving You"	Ingebrigtsen	3:26
3.	"One More Try"	Ingebrigtsen, Adams, Marazzi, Read	3:29
4.	"Ready or Not"	Adams, Cunnah, Ingebrigtsen, Marazzi	3:54
5.	"Same Old Brand New You"	Adams, Ingebrigtsen, Read, White	4:15
6.	"Take On Me"	Furuholmen, Harket, Waaktaar	3:34
7.	"You're Not in Love"	Adams	4:25
8.	"Here Comes the Rain"	Porter, Marazzi, Ingebrigtsen	4:34
9.	"Everytime"	Adams, Ingebrigtsen, Read	4:30
10.	"Like a Rose"	Mac, Hector, Adams	4:13
11.	"High and Dry"	Marazzi, T. Adams, Chesney Hawkes	4:09
12.	"Caught in the Middle"	Adams, Marazzi, Mitra, Porter	3:27
13.	"No More"	Bensusen, Cueni, Robbins, Sharpe	3:39
14.	"Learn to Fly"	Gordeno, Ingebrigtsen, Mitra, Porter	4:12
15.	"If You Were My Girl"	Ingebrigtsen	4:52
16.	"Walking in the Rain"	Adams, Ingebrigtsen	4:02
17.	"Forever in Love"	Adams, Ingebrigtsen, Read	3:08
18.	"One Last Song"	Ingebrigtsen	4:50
Total length:			73:06
