= Higher state of consciousness =

Higher state of consciousness may refer to:

- Higher consciousness
- Higher State of Consciousness (song), a song by American electronic artist Josh Wink
