= Like a Rose =

Like a Rose may refer to:

- Like a Rose (album) by Ashley Monroe
- "Like a Rose" (song) by A1
