= Rediscovered (A1 album) =

Studio album by A1
- Released: 2 November 2012
- Recorded: 2011–2012
- Studio: Stockholm, Sweden; Oslo, Norway
- Genre: Pop; soft rock; electronic
- Length: 35:22
- Label: daWorks
- Producer: Ben Adams; Christian Ingebrigtsen; Mark Read; Thomas Kongshavn; Toby Lee; Lee McCutcheon; Mark Taylor; Michael Hunter Ochs; Rykkinnfella; Whiteroom; Chris Winter

A1 chronology
Waiting for Daylight (2010)	Rediscovered (2012)	Caught in the Middle: The Collection (2016)

Singles from Rediscovered
- 1. "Just Three Words" Released: 8 April 2012; 2. "Trust Me" Released: 5 October 2012; 3. "Christopher Columbus" Released: 20 May 2013

Rediscovered is the fifth studio album by English-Norwegian pop group A1. The album was released on 2 November 2012 in Norway, exclusively through daWorks Records. Two singles have thus far been released from the album: "Just Three Words", featuring singer Annie Khalid, which was released as a promotional single in April 2012, and the album's official lead single, "Trust Me", released on 5 October 2012. The album debuted at number 17 in Norway, becoming their lowest-charting album in their career. "Christopher Columbus" was released as the album's third single in April 2013. "That Somebody Is Me" has been released as a free track on 17 October 2014, during the Big Reunion Tour. This is the last album as a trio before original member Paul Marazzi returned to the group nearly six years later.

== Composition ==
Band member Mark Read said of the album; "I'm really proud of the amazing work we've put into this album. I feel we've really pulled together a great collection of songs, & you'll be hearing a lot more about it the next few weeks. There's one song that I can listen to continuously on loop before going to bed, & it's the last track on the album. Not long until you can hear it too." A piece on the album on the group's official site reads; "'Rediscovered' is a musical journey in which the band rediscover what got them into music in the first place; extremely catchy pop songs, with a back to basics approach. From the very sing-along-able "Christopher Columbus", which helped inspire the album title, to powerful and stomping dance floor tunes like 'That Somebody Is Me' and 'Lovesick'. But whilst this album is about going back to their roots, it’s also about venturing into new territories, and a lot of people may be quite surprised by the songs that the band have written for this album. For A1, this is the album that will bridge the gap between fans who‘ve stayed true for all these years, to the people who are discovering them for the first time."

== Singles ==
- "Just Three Words" was released as the first single from the album on 8 April 2012. The track is a duet with singer-songwriter Annie Khalid. Although not released to promote the album, and only being available through the iTunes Store as a promotional single, the track was successful across Norway and became the most added track on Norwegian radio on the week beginning 11 April 2012. No music video was released for the single.
- "Trust Me" was released as the official lead, and second overall, single from the album on 5 October 2012. The track is described as "taking a new musical route, with a raw 1960s inspired sound." A music video was filmed for the track, and it will premiere on 22 October. The track peaked at No. 4 on the Norwegian Singles Chart, becoming the most successful single from the album thus far.
- "Christopher Columbus" was released as the third single from the album on 20 May 2013.

== Track listing ==
Rediscovered track listing
No.	Title	Writer(s)	Producer(s)	Length
1.	"Trust Me"	Read, Kongshavn, Amundsen, Sørum	Thomas Kongshavn	3:28
2.	"Christopher Columbus"	Adams, Read, Patrick Mascall	Adams	3:23
3.	"Riot"	Adams, Read, Sara Skjoldnes	Adams	3:22
4.	"That Somebody Is Me"	Adams, Read, Lisa Greene, Lee Mac	Lee McCutcheon	3:12
5.	"Lovesick"	Adams, Read, Mascall, Toby Lee	Adams, Toby Lee	3:37
6.	"Fallen from Grace"	Adams, Read	Mark Taylor, Chris Winter	3:42
7.	"Starlights"	Adams, Read, Lee Mac	Lee McCutcheon	3:03
8.	"Blackout"	Adams, Read, Patrick Mascall	Adams	3:50
9.	"Just Three Words" (featuring Annie Khalid)	Adams, Read, Ingebrigtsen, Khalid	Adams, Rykkinnfella	3:19
10.	"Stones"	Ingebrigtsen, Ochs, Wilhelmsen	Ingebrigtsen, Ochs, Whiteroom	4:06
11.	"Grateful"	Ingebrigtsen, Ochs	Christian Ingebrigtsen	3:00
12.	"Critical Love"	Mathilde Johnson, John Erling Johnson	Adams, Read, Ingebrigtsen	3:31

== Charts ==
Chart performance for Rediscovered
Chart (2012)	Peak position
Norwegian Albums (VG-lista)	17
