= Annie Khalid =

Pakistani-born British singer and model (born 1987)

Annie Khalid عینی خالد
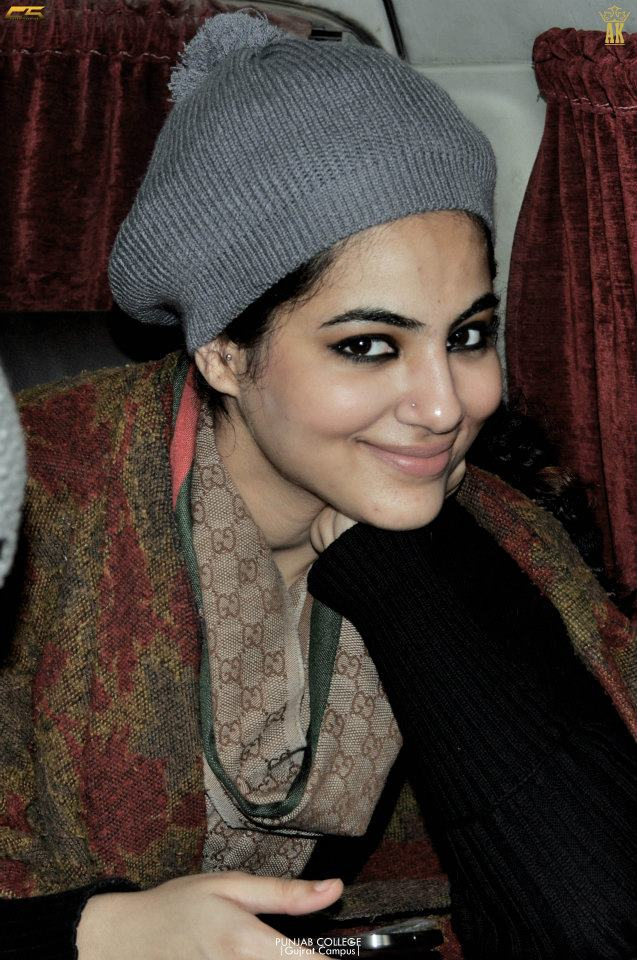
- Khalid during a concert tour in Punjab, Pakistan, 2012

Background information
- Born: Noor-ul-Ain Khalid; 27 March 1987 (age 39); Lahore, Pakistan
- Origin: Lahore, Pakistan
- Genres: Pakistani pop
- Occupations: Singer; model
- Years active: 2006–present
- Spouse(s): Malik Noureed Awan (m. 2012; div. 2013) Saad Ahmed Khan (m. 2014)

Noor-ul-Ain Khalid (Urdu: نور العین خالد; born 27 March 1987), known professionally as Annie Khalid (عینی خالد), is a Pakistani-born British singer and model. She rose to fame in Pakistan in 2006, after releasing the single "Mahiya"; the song was used in the 2007 film Awarapan in India and became the most-played Pakistani song of 2005, 2006 and 2007.

== Early life ==
Khalid was born to a Kashmiri father and a Yemeni mother in the city of Lahore on 27 March 1987. When she was six months old, the family left Pakistan and moved to the United Kingdom, settling first in East London and later in Essex.

== Career ==
=== Music ===
Her first single, "Mahiya" became a massive hit in Pakistan, following its release in 2005. It was later used in the Indian film Awarapan.

On 25 November 2010, Khalid released her UK debut single "Be My Baby" along with a remix of the track by British DJ Judge Jules. After meeting at a charity function, Khalid collaborated with the English–Norwegian boy band A1 for a single "Just 3 Words" and went on tour with them, performing in Norway and the UK. In 2011, Khalid was nominated as Best Female Singer at the Pakistan Media Awards.

In September 2013, she released the single "Boom Boom Danze" with Beenie Man.

=== Modelling ===
She walked at the 2010 L'Oréal Karachi fashion week for BNS couture and in 2011 for Ammar Belal. She was featured in LOOK magazine in June 2011. The same month, she launched a café in Lahore, the AK Lounge.

=== Charity ===
She was appointed Norway's Red Cross Goodwill ambassador in 2011, after her efforts fundraising for Pakistani flood victims.

== Personal life ==
In July 2012, Khalid married Pakistani businessman Malik Noureed Awan, but the couple divorced in 2013. On 26 December 2014, she married British-Pakistani businessman Saad Ahmed Khan, with whom she has a daughter.

== Discography ==
=== Albums ===
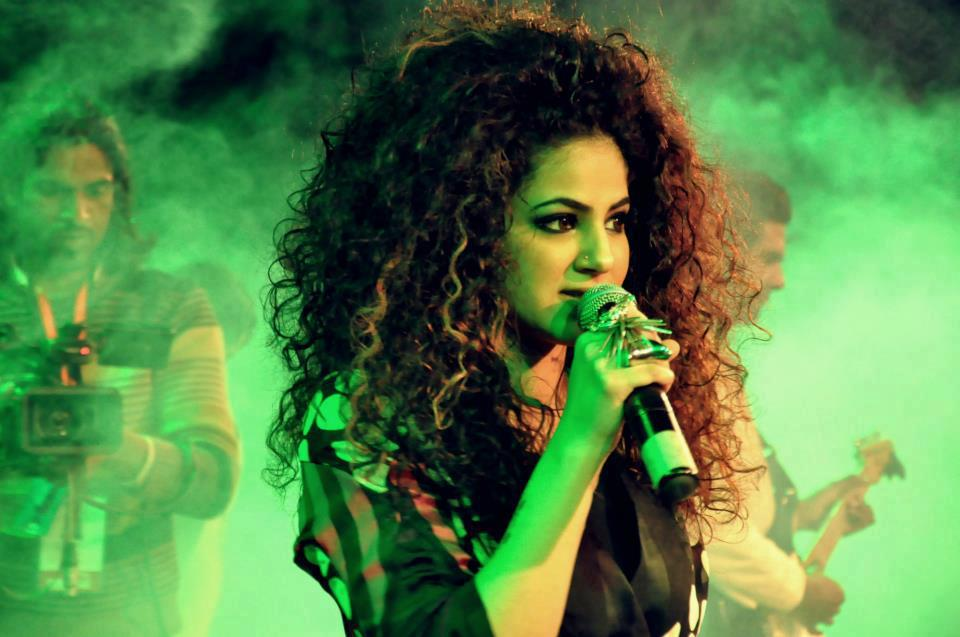
Annie Khalid during a concert

Year	Title	Peak Positions	
Year	Title	Pakistan Albums Chart	Indian Albums Chart
2006	Princess: Released: 16 April 2006; Label: Formats: CD	--	--
2010	Kya Yehi Pyaar Hai: Released: 10 November 2010; Label: Black pen, Fire; Formats: CD, digital download	–	–

=== Singles ===
- "Mahiya" Remix - Awarapan (2007)
- "Tenu Takiya", featuring RnB (2008)
- "Just Three Words", featuring A1 (2012)
- "Vari Vari Jawan" "Humvee Assault" (2013)
- "Vote For Change" PTI Song (2014)
- "Boom Boom Danze", featuring Beenie Man Brand Ambassador (2014)
- "Kya Yehi Pyaar Hai" Bahadurabad (2014)
- "Tujhe Yaad Kiya" "Saada Haq Ithe Rakh"(2014)
- "Tharki Saala" "The Profligator" (2014)
- "Tu Wo To Nahi" "Gunstar Heroes" (2014)
- "Party Karlo" "Jaan e Jaan" Overkill Mafia (2015)
- "Be My Baby", Golden Axe (2015)
- "Princess" Jet Set Radio (2015)
- "Listen (Tujh Se Meri Jaan Hai)" Binary Domain (2015)
- "Kali Raat" Young Tarang (2016)
- "Do You See Me" Robot 2 (2015)

== See also ==
- List of Pakistani musicians
- List of people from Lahore
