= Higher State of Consciousness =

1995 single by Josh Wink

Single by Josh Wink

from the album Left Above the Clouds
- Released: March 27, 1995
- Genre: Acid techno; rave Breakbeat
- Length: 6:15 (Tweekin' Acid Funk); 3:00 (Official Tweekin' Acid Funk radio edit); 4:15 (Strictly Rhythm Youtube Upload)
- Label: Strictly Rhythm
- Songwriter: Josh Wink
- Producer: Josh Wink

Josh Wink singles chronology
"Don't Laugh" (1995)	"Higher State of Consciousness" (1995)	"Are You There..." (1997)

Music video
- "Higher State of Consciousness" on YouTube

"Higher State of Consciousness" is a song by American electronic dance music DJ and producer Josh Wink. It was both written and produced by Wink and first released in March 1995 by Strictly Rhythm, and then included on his debut album, Left Above the Clouds (1996). The song peaked at number eight on the UK Singles Chart and was a top-10 hit also in Ireland and Spain. In 2022, Rolling Stone magazine ranked the track number 128 in their list of the "200 Greatest Dance Songs of All Time".

== Background and release ==
Josh Wink was born in Philadelphia, Pennsylvania and raised on every kind of music. His mother was into self awareness, such as vegetarianism and yoga, and this influenced Wink at a young age. The original version of "Higher State of Consciousness" was featured on the Strictly Rhythm compilation The Deep and Slow. The label expressed interest in him and Wink wanted to release a remix of the original from The Deep and Slow on the label as a single. Wink sent them the mix, but the label found it too harsh sonically and wanted him to go back in the studio and redo it. He told them that they had to take it as it was or he wouldn't release it. To DJ Mag in 2025, he explained, "I don't know if I could even recreate it. My studio was my bedroom. That's why I've never done a remake or reversion, remix of it. Because I don't think I could do the original justice. I think it just happened. A divine intervention of some sorts."

Wink was influenced by the German acid house sound and "Higher State of Consciousness" was created with two Roland TR-303s, a TR-909 and a DOD heavy rock distortion pedal. To sequence the track, he used a computer and it was completed in 1994 and released in 1995. About the track, he has said, "There's a breakbeat in it. There's a sense of drum and bass and jungle with time stretching and different drum patterns. And then there's the acid house." It reached number eight on the UK Singles Chart in October that year as well as number one on the UK Dance Singles Chart. Norman Cook thanked him for making the record, telling Wink that it made things a lot easier for Cook to break through. In 1996, new remixes of were released, reaching number seven on the UK Singles Chart. These remixes were not made by Wink and he felt they weren't the autentic, true sound of him.

== Critical reception ==
A reviewer from Music Week rated the song four out of five upon the release of the 1996 remixes. Andy Crysell from NME wrote about the original release, "Huge on import, massive in clubs worldwide, the Winkster's 303-breakbeat mega-clash finally secures a UK release and sets its sights on the charts. Josh on Top of the Pops? Blimey!" In December 1995, the NME dance column Vibes ranked "Higher State of Consciousness" number nine in their list of "Singles of the Year". David Bennun from The Guardian viewed it as a "Chemical Brothers-replicating single".

== Performance ==
The song was initially a hit in the United Kingdom in 1995, where it reached number eight on the UK Singles Chart. The official 'Original Tweekin' Acid Funk Mix' was remixed by several artists the following year. The radio edit was remixed by Dex and Jonesey and the single peaked at number seven on the UK Singles Chart. The track was remixed for a third time in 2007 by Serbian-Australian DJ Dirty South and Australian dance act TV Rock. This remix reached number five in Finland and allowed the original version to climb to number three on the UK Dance Chart. A key sample from the track was used by the Porn Kings for their 1996 track "Up to No Good". Josh Wink had no control over the selection of remixing artists, nor over the final decision to release those remixes. The track was used as a bed by Nicky Campbell on his afternoon BBC Radio 1 show.

== Impact and legacy ==
British electronic dance and clubbing magazine Mixmag included "Higher State of Consciousness" in their list of "The Biggest Drops in Dance Music" in 2020, writing, "'Higher State..' is the mate who stuffs a bomb of mandy in your hand and leads you down the dusty dirt path toward your first free party, a warren of parked cars, soundsystems and figures silhouetted against the night sky. The ruff breakbeats lure you in and the creeping acid line keeps you hooked as it wriggles devilishly inside your head. Nothing will ever be the same again."

== Track listings ==
- 1995 UK CD single
1. "Higher State of Consciousness" (radio edit) (2:55)
2. "Higher State of Consciousness" (original Tweekin' Acid Funk edit) (3:00)
3. "Higher State of Consciousness" (DJ Wink's Hardhouse mix) (7:56)
4. "Higher State of Consciousness" (Jules & Skins Short Vox mix) (4:46)
5. "Higher State of Consciousness" (Jules & Skins Long & Epic mix) (6:33)
- 1996 UK CD single
1. "Higher State of Consciousness" (radio edit (Dex and Jonesey)) (3:39)
2. "Higher State of Consciousness" (original Tweekin' Acid Funk mix) (6:16)
3. "Higher State of Consciousness" (Dex & Jonesey's Higher Stated mix) (6:44)
4. "Higher State of Consciousness" (Mr Spring's Maggott mix) (7:13)
5. "Higher State of Consciousness" (Itty Bitty Boozy Woozy mix) (6:06)
6. "Higher State of Consciousness" (Jules and Skins long epic mix) (6:37)
- 2007 UK CD single
1. "Higher State of Consciousness" (Dirty South & TV rock radio edit)
2. "Higher State of Consciousness" (Dirty South & TV rock club mix)
3. "Higher State of Consciousness" (Marco V remix)
4. "Higher State of Consciousness" (Barratt & Falconi remix)
5. "Higher State of Consciousness" (original Tweekin Acid Funk mix)

== Charts ==
=== Original release ===
Chart (1995)	Peak position
Canada Dance/Urban (RPM)	11
Finland (Suomen virallinen lista)	20
Ireland (IRMA)	8
Norway (VG-lista)	13
Scottish Singles Sales (Official Charts)	23
Spain (AFYVE)	9
Sweden (Sverigetopplistan)	51
UK Singles (Official Charts)	8
UK Dance (Official Charts)	1
UK Club Chart (Music Week)	71
US Dance Club Play (Billboard)	10

=== 1996 remixes ===
Chart (1996)	Peak position
Finland (Suomen virallinen lista)	13
Ireland (IRMA)	8
Israel (Israeli Singles Chart)	26
Netherlands (Single Top 100)	47
Scottish Singles Sales (Official Charts)	10
UK Singles (Official Charts)	7
UK Dance (Official Charts)	1
UK Airplay (Music Week)	35
UK Club Chart (Music Week)	1
UK Pop Tip Club Chart (Music Week)	1

=== 2007 remix ===
Chart (2007)	Peak position
Finland (Suomen virallinen lista)	5
Netherlands (Single Top 100)	52
Spain (Promusicae)	18
UK Dance (Official Charts) Original version	3

=== Year-end charts ===
Chart (1995)	Position
UK Club Chart (Music Week)	26

Chart (1996)	Position
UK Singles (OCC)	60
UK Club Chart (Music Week)	24
UK Pop Tip Club Chart (Music Week)	42

== Certifications ==
Region	Certification	Certified units/sales
United Kingdom (BPI)	Silver	200,000^{^}
^{^} Shipments figures based on certification alone.

== Release history ==
Region	Version	Date	Format(s)	Label(s)	Ref.
Germany	Original	March 27, 1995	CD	ZYX Music	
United Kingdom	Original	October 9, 1995	12-inch vinyl; CD; cassette	Manifesto	
United Kingdom	1996 remixes	July 15, 1996	12-inch vinyl; CD; cassette	Manifesto	
