= The Porn Kings =

British electronic music group

- Origin: England
- Genres: Electronic, dance
- Years active: 1996–2006
- Labels: All Around the World
- Past members: Davy T Paul Rowland; Dan Evans; Kenny Hayes

The Porn Kings were a British dance music group, originally formed by Davy T, Paul Rowland, and Dan Evans.

Davy and Dan were members of 2 Funky 2, best known for the 1993 hit "Brothers and Sisters". Davy was also a member of DJs Collective alongside Lee Butler, Paul Robertson, and Joe Da Bone, who were best known for the 1996 single "Rock to the Rhythm". Some vinyl copies were scratched out due to a fallout between Davy and Lee.

The group's first single was released as a white label called "Pumping the Junk". It featured an original sample from Josh Wink's "Higher State of Consciousness". The track was picked up very quickly by All Around the World Productions, where it was reworked and renamed "Up to No Good" in 1996.

The debut release became a hit in Germany, the United Kingdom, Canada, and the United States. The band released the album Up to No Good in 1999, recorded at P. K. Studios and PWL in Manchester, England. They also produced remixes for DJ Quicksilver, Young MC, Josh Wink, and Pamela Fernandez. Their track "We're Watching You" was included on the soundtrack of the 2001 film The Hole, starring Thora Birch and Keira Knightley.

Kenny Hayes joined the group to help write the second single and the group's debut album.

Further UK hits included "Amour (C'Mon)", "Up to the Wildstyle", "Sledger", and "Shake Ya Shimmy".

== Discography ==
=== Studio albums ===
Title	Album details
Best of British – The Ultimate Clubbing Experience	Released: 1998; Label: All Around the World (#GLOBE7); Formats: Cassette, CD

=== Singles ===
Year	Title	Peak chart positions										Album
Year	Title	UK	UK Dance	EUR	FRA	GER	NED	NOR	SCO	SWE	SWI	Album
1996	"Up to No Good"	28	2	40	30	20	70	8	37	—	46	Best of British – The Ultimate Clubbing Experience
1997	"Amour (C'Mon)"	17	2	33	—	44	52	13	12	56	—	Best of British – The Ultimate Clubbing Experience
1999	"Up to the Wildstyle" (The Porn Kings vs DJ Supreme)	10	8	43	—	—	50	—	14	59	—	Best of British – The Ultimate Clubbing Experience
2001	"Sledger"	71	—	—	—	—	—	—	59	—	—	Non-album singles
2003	"Shake Ya Shimmy" (The Porn Kings vs Flip & Fill)	28	11	80	—	—	—	—	16	—	—	Non-album singles
"—" denotes items that did not chart or were not released in that territory.

== Rock the Dancefloor ==
Many of their songs are also featured on the Rock the Dancefloor compilation series of albums made by All Around the World for Preston-based radio station Rock FM. Two of their tracks featured on each album up to the seventh series.

=== Rock the Dancefloor 1 ===
"Up to tha Wildstyle" - Disc 1 Track 2 - Porn Kings vs DJ Supreme
"Up to No Good" - Disc 1 Track 7 - Porn Kings

=== Rock the Dancefloor 2 ===
"Up to tha Wildstyle '99 Remix" - Disc 1 Track 4 - Porn Kings vs DJ Supreme
"Kickin' the Beat" - Disc 2 Track 8 - Porn Kings feat Pamela Ferrandez

=== Rock the Dancefloor 3 ===
"It's a Party" - Disc 1 Track 5 - Porn Kings
"La B-Bop" - Disc 2 Track 5 - Porn Kings

=== Rock the Dancefloor 4 ===
"Sledger (Nasty Boyz Remix)" - Disc 1 Track 9 - Porn Kings
"Amour (C'mon)" - Disc 2 Track 9 - Porn Kings

=== Rock the Dancefloor 7 ===
"Shake Ya Shimmy" (Flip & Fill Remix) - Disc 1 - Track 7 - Porn Kings v Flip & Fill
