= Caught in the Middle (A1 song) =

2002 single by A1

Single by A1

from the album Make It Good
- B-side: "You're Not in Love"; "Power of Desire"; "One More Try" (acoustic); "2:59"
- Released: 21 January 2002
- Genre: Soft rock
- Length: 3:28
- Label: Columbia
- Songwriters: Ben Adams; Paul Marazzi; Chris Porter; Rick Mitra
- Producer: Mike Hedges

A1 singles chronology
"No More" (2001)	"Caught in the Middle" (2002)	"Make It Good" (2002)

Music video
- "Caught in the Middle" on YouTube

"Caught in the Middle" is a song by British-Norwegian boy band A1. It was released on 21 January 2002 as the lead single from their third studio album, Make It Good (2002). The song peaked at number two on the UK Singles Chart and received a silver certification from the British Phonographic Industry (BPI) in October 2018. In the United States, the song received airplay and appeared on the Radio & Records CHR/Pop Top 50 chart, peaking at number 46; it was A1's only single to chart in the US.

== Lyrical content ==
Lyrically, the singer is an individual lamenting the fact that they cannot seem to stop dwelling on a previous partner despite the fact that their new relationship and situation are better, which they acknowledge.

== Track listings ==
- UK CD1
1. "Caught in the Middle"
2. "You're Not in Love" (Ben Adams, Paul Marazzi)
3. "Power of Desire" (Christian Ingebrigtsen, Mark Read)
4. "Caught in the Middle" (CD extra video)
- UK CD2
1. "Caught in the Middle" (acoustic)
2. "One More Try" (acoustic)
3. "2:59"
4. "One More Try" (acoustic CD extra video)
- UK cassette single and European CD single
1. "Caught in the Middle"
2. "Caught in the Middle" (Almighty mix)
- Australian CD single
1. "Caught in the Middle"
2. "One More Try" (acoustic)
3. "2:59"
4. "Same Old Brand New You" (album version)
5. "Caught in the Middle" (Almighty mix)

== Personnel ==
Personnel are lifted from the UK CD1 liner notes.

- Ben Adams – writing
- Paul Marazzi – writing
- Chris Porter – writing
- Rick Mitra – writing
- Mike Hedges – production
- Ash Howes – mixing
- Chris Blair – mastering

== Charts ==
=== Weekly charts ===
Chart (2002)	Peak position
Australia (ARIA)	23
Austria (Ö3 Austria Top 40)	45
Belgium (Ultratop 50 Flanders)	32
Czech Republic (IFPI)	8
Denmark (Tracklisten)	2
Denmark Airplay (Tracklisten)	5
Europe (Eurochart Hot 100)	21
Europe (European Hit Radio)	26
Finland Airplay (Radiosoittolista)	8
France (SNEP)	15
Germany (GfK)	68
Hungary (Rádiós Top 40)	8
Hungary (Single Top 40)	15
Ireland (IRMA)	19
Latvia (Latvijas Top 40)	15
Netherlands (Dutch Top 40 Tipparade)	4
Netherlands (Single Top 100)	44
New Zealand (Recorded Music NZ)	14
Norway (VG-lista)	3
Poland Airplay (Polish Airplay Charts)	2
Romania (Romanian Top 100)	11
Scottish Singles Sales (Official Charts)	3
Spain Airplay (Top 40 Radio)	36
Sweden (Sverigetopplistan)	7
Switzerland (Schweizer Hitparade)	50
UK Singles (Official Charts)	2
UK Airplay (Music Week)	3
US CHR/Pop Top 50 (Radio & Records)	46

=== Year-end charts ===
Chart (2002)	Position
Europe (European Hit Radio)	54
New Zealand (RIANZ)	45
Norway Vinter Period (VG-lista)	4
Sweden (Hitlistan)	48
UK Singles (OCC)	57
UK Airplay (Music Week)	69

== Certifications ==
Region	Certification	Certified units/sales
Australia (ARIA)	Gold	35,000^{^}
Norway (IFPI Norway)	Platinum	
United Kingdom (BPI)	Silver	200,000^{‡}
^{^} Shipments figures based on certification alone.^{‡} Sales+streaming figures based on certification alone.

== Release history ==
Region	Date	Format(s)	Label(s)	Ref.
United Kingdom	21 January 2002	CD; cassette	Columbia	
Australia	17 June 2002	CD	Columbia	
