= Summertime of Our Lives =

1999 single by A1

Single by A1

from the album Here We Come
- B-side: "If You Were My Girl"
- Released: 30 August 1999
- Length: 3:22
- Label: Columbia
- Songwriters: Ben Adams; Christian Ingebrigtsen; Paul Marazzi; Mark Read
- Producers: Peter Cunnah; Ben Adams; Christian Ingebrigtsen; Mark Read

A1 singles chronology
"Be the First to Believe" (1999)	"Summertime of Our Lives" (1999)	"Ready or Not" / "Everytime" (1999)

Music video
- "Summertime of Our Lives" on YouTube

"Summertime of Our Lives" is a song by British-Norwegian boy band A1. It was released on 30 August 1999 as the second single from their debut studio album, Here We Come (1999). The single was released on 30 August 1999 and peaked at No. 5 on the UK Singles Chart.

== Track listings ==
UK CD1

1. "Summertime of Our Lives" – 3:21
2. "If You Were My Girl" – 4:50
3. "Summertime of Our Lives" (Metro club mix) – 5:26
4. CD extra

UK CD2

1. "Summertime of Our Lives" – 3:21
2. "Summertime of Our Lives" (Almighty club mix) – 8:16
3. "Be the First to Believe" (K-Klass Reprise) – 6:35

UK cassette single

1. "Summertime of Our Lives" – 3:21
2. "If You Were My Girl" – 4:50

== Charts ==
=== Weekly charts ===
Chart (1999–2000)	Peak position
Australia (ARIA)	44
Europe (Eurochart Hot 100)	25
Iceland (Íslenski Listinn Topp 40)	39
New Zealand (Recorded Music NZ)	22
Scotland Singles (OCC)	6
UK Singles (OCC)	5

=== Year-end charts ===
Chart (1999)	Position
UK Singles (OCC)	164
