= Be the First to Believe =

1999 single by A1

Single by A1

from the album Here We Come
- B-side: "Miracle"
- Released: 21 June 1999
- Length: 3:19
- Label: Columbia
- Songwriters: Peter Cunnah, Ben Adams, Christian Ingebrigtsen, Mark Read, Paul Marazzi
- Producer: Metro

A1 singles chronology
"Be the First to Believe" (1999)	"Summertime of Our Lives" (1999)

Music video
- "Be the First to Believe" on YouTube

"Be the First to Believe" is a song by British-Norwegian boy band A1, released as the lead single from their debut album, Here We Come (1999). Released on 21 June 1999 as A1's debut single, the song peaked at No. 6 on the UK Singles Chart, becoming the band's first chart entry in the UK.

== Track listings ==
UK CD1

1. "Be the First to Believe" – 3:22
2. "Miracle" – 3:09
3. "Be the First to Believe" (Phats & Small Mutant Disco Mix Part 1) – 6:00

UK CD2

1. "Be the First to Believe" – 3:22
2. "Be the First to Believe" (Amen club mix) – 8:01
3. "A1 Chat Exclusively to You" – 4:24

UK cassette single

1. "Be the First to Believe" – 3:22
2. "Miracle" – 3:09

Australian CD single

1. "Be the First to Believe" – 3:22
2. "Be the First to Believe" (Phats & Small Mutant Disco Mix Part 1) – 6:00
3. "Be the First to Believe" (Amen club mix) – 8:01
4. "Miracle" – 3:09

== Charts ==
=== Weekly charts ===
Chart (1999)	Peak position
Australia (ARIA)	115
Europe (Eurochart Hot 100)	31
Germany (GfK)	95
Scotland Singles (OCC)	6
Spain Airplay (Top 40 Radio)	23
Sweden (Sverigetopplistan)	48
UK Singles (OCC)	6

=== Year-end charts ===
Chart (1999)	Position
UK Singles (OCC)	133
