= Make It Good (album) =

Studio album by A1
- Released: 8 April 2002
- Recorded: 2001–2002
- Genres: Pop; pop rock
- Length: 47:35
- Label: Columbia
- Producers: Mike Hedges; Ash Howes; Ger McDonnell; Chris Blair; Ian Grimble

A1 chronology
The A List (2000)	Make It Good (2002)	The Best of A1 (2004)

Singles from Make It Good
- 1. "Caught in the Middle" Released: 21 January 2002; 2. "Make It Good" Released: 13 May 2002; 3. "Nos Differences" Released: 21 October 2002

Make It Good is the third studio album released by British-Norwegian boy band A1. The album was released on 8 April 2002, leading on from the success of the lead single, "Caught in the Middle". In an attempt to reach the French market, the band recorded a French version of "Caught in the Middle", with singer Ève Angeli. This appeared as a bonus track on the album in France.

== Background ==
The album was considered a change in style from their previous efforts, bringing a more adult sound, removing more of the electro-pop influenced tracks and replacing them with soft-rock tracks, laden with instruments and guitars.

== Track listing ==
No.	Title	Writer(s)	Producer(s)	Length
1.	"Caught in the Middle"	Ben Adams, Paul Marazzi, Chris Porter, Rick Mitra	Mike Hedges, Ash Howes, Chris Blair	3:26
2.	"Make It Good"	Christian Ingebrigtsen, Mark Read	Hedges, Howes, Blair	3:38
3.	"Here Comes the Rain"	Ingebrigtsen, Marazzi, Porter	Hedges, Howes	4:35
4.	"When I'm Missing You"	Adams, Ingebrigtsen, Read, Marazzi, Tim Woodcock, Tim Lever	Hedges, Howes	3:30
5.	"This Ain't What Love Is About"	Adams, Ingebrigtsen	Hedges, Ger McDonnell	3:54
6.	"Crazy for Leaving You"	Ingebrigtsen	Hedges, McDonnell	3:27
7.	"Learn to Fly"	Ingebrigtsen, Mitra, Porter, Peter Gordeno	Hedges, McDonnell	4:13
8.	"Isn't It Cheap"	Marazzi, Terry Adams, Chesney Hawkes	Hedges, Ian Grimble	4:08
9.	"If I Can't Have You"	Adams, Read, Mitra	Hedges, McDonnell	3:52
10.	"Make It Through the Night"	Adams, Ingebrigtsen, Read, Marazzi	Hedges, McDonnell	5:23
11.	"Cherish This Love"	Adams	Hedges, McDonnell	4:43
12.	"Do You Remember"	Adams, Read, Woodcock	Hedges, McDonnell	3:03
13.	"One Last Song"	Ingebrigtsen	Hedges	4:48
14.	"Let It Out"	Marazzi, T. Adams, Hawkes	Hedges, McDonnell	3:58

French bonus track
No.	Title	Writer(s)	Producer(s)	Length
15.	"Nos Differences" (featuring Ève Angeli)	Adams, Marazzi, Porter, Mitra	Hedges, Howes, Blair	3:27

Bonus tracks
No.	Title	Writer(s)	Producer(s)	Length
1.	"You're Not in Love"	Ben Adams, Paul Marazzi	Mike Hedges	4:25
2.	"Power of Desire"	Christian Ingebrigtsen, Mark Read	Hedges	3:16
3.	"2:59"	Ingebrigtsen, Read, Adams, Marazzi	Hedges	3:11
4.	"High and Dry"	Marazzi, Terry Adams, Chesney Hawkes	Hedges, Ash Howes, Chris Blair	4:09
5.	"Do It Again"	Ingebrigtsen, Marazzi	Hedges, Howes, Blair	4:04

== Charts ==
=== Weekly charts ===
Chart (2002)	Peak position
Australian Albums (ARIA)	94
Danish Albums (Hitlisten)	19
European Albums Chart	35
Finnish Albums (Suomen virallinen lista)	28
New Zealand Albums (RMNZ)	37
Norwegian Albums (VG-lista)	4
Scottish Albums (OCC)	15
Singaporean Albums (RIAS)	2
Swedish Albums (Sverigetopplistan)	31
UK Albums (OCC)	15

=== Year-end charts ===
Chart (2002)	Position
Norwegian Albums Chart (Skoleslutt Period)	12

== Certifications ==
Region	Certification	Certified units/sales
Norway (IFPI Norway)	Gold	25,000^{*}
^{*} Sales figures based on certification alone.
