= Here We Come (A1 album) =

Studio album by A1
- Released: 22 November 1999
- Recorded: 1998–1999
- Genre: Pop
- Length: 37:19
- Label: Columbia
- Producer: A1; Metro; Steve Mac

A1 chronology
Here We Come (1999)	The A List (2000)

Singles from Here We Come
- 1. "Be the First to Believe" Released: 21 June 1999; 2. "Summertime of Our Lives" Released: 30 August 1999; 3. "Everytime / Ready or Not" Released: 8 November 1999; 4. "Like a Rose" Released: 21 February 2000

Professional ratings
Review scores
Source	Rating
AllMusic	2/5 stars

Here We Come is the debut studio album by British-Norwegian boy band A1. It was released on 22 November 1999. The album was certified as Gold in the UK, selling nearly 100,000 copies.

== Track listing ==
No.	Title	Writer(s)	Producer(s)	Length
1.	"Forever in Love"	Ben Adams, Christian Ingebrigtsen, Mark Read	Steve Mac	3:08
2.	"Be the First to Believe"	Adams, Ingebrigtsen, Read, Peter Cunnah, Paul Marazzi	Metro	3:19
3.	"Summertime of Our Lives"	Adams, Ingebrigtsen, Read, Cunnah, Marazzi	Metro	3:22
4.	"Ready or Not"	Adams, Ingebrigtsen, Read, Cunnah, Marazzi	Metro	3:55
5.	"Everytime"	Adams, Ingebrigtsen, Read	Metro	4:31
6.	"If Only"	Adams, Ingebrigtsen, Read, Marazzi	Mac	4:11
7.	"Hey You (It's Alright)"	Mac, John Francis Matthews, Chris Laws	Mac	4:09
8.	"Like a Rose"	Mac, Wayne Hector, Adams	Mac	4:11
9.	"Walking in the Rain"	Adams, Ingebrigtsen	Mac	4:02
10.	"Still Around"	Mac, Shep Solomon	Mac	4:20
11.	"I Still Believe"	Read	Metro	4:59
12.	"Heaven by Your Side"	Adams, Read, Marazzi	Metro	4:25

== B-side songs ==
Bonus Tracks
No.	Title	Writer(s)	Producer(s)	Length
1.	"Miracle"	Adams, Ingebrigtsen, Read	Terry Adams	3:09
2.	"If You Were My Girl"	Ingebrigtsen	METRO	4:52
3.	"White Christmas (Acappella)"	Irving Berlin	METRO	1:07
4.	"A1 Medley"	A1	METRO	2:39

== Charts and certifications ==
=== Charts ===
Chart (1999–2000)	Peak position
Australian Albums (ARIA)	111
European Albums Chart	93
Japanese Albums (Oricon)	63
Norwegian Albums (VG-lista)	4
Scottish Albums (OCC)	31
Singapore Albums (SPVA)	6
UK Albums (OCC)	20

=== Year-end charts ===
Chart (2000)	Peak position
Norwegian Albums Chart (Vinter Period)	8
Singaporean English Albums (SPVA)	7

=== Certifications ===
Region	Certification	Certified units/sales
United Kingdom (BPI)	Gold	100,000^{^}
^{^} Shipments figures based on certification alone.
