= Like a Rose (song) =

2000 single by A1

Single by A1

from the album Here We Come
- B-side: "If Only" (remix); "Talkin' Bout a Revolution" (live); "A1 Medley"
- Released: 21 February 2000
- Length: 4:12
- Label: Columbia
- Songwriters: Steve Mac; Wayne Hector; Ben Adams
- Producer: Steve Mac

A1 singles chronology
"Ready or Not" / "Everytime" (1999)	"Like a Rose" (2000)	"Take On Me" (2000)

Music video
- "Like a Rose" on YouTube

"Like a Rose" is a song by British-Norwegian boy band A1. It was released on 21 February 2000 as the fourth single from their debut album, Here We Come (1999). The single peaked at No. 6 on the UK Singles Chart. The single was the final official single from the album; however, a follow-up promo single, "If Only", was released exclusively on 12-inch vinyl.

== Track listings ==
UK CD1

1. "Like a Rose" (Valentine mix)
2. "If Only" (Almighty club mix)
3. "Everytime" (instrumental)

UK CD2

1. "Like a Rose" (Heart mix)
2. "Talkin' Bout a Revolution" (live)
3. "A1 Medley"

UK cassette single

1. "Like a Rose" (Valentines mix)
2. "A1 Medley"

== Charts ==
=== Weekly charts ===
Chart (2000)	Peak position
Europe (Eurochart Hot 100)	30
Ireland (IRMA)	16
Norway (VG-lista)	11
Scotland Singles (OCC)	3
UK Singles (OCC)	6

=== Year-end charts ===
Chart (2000)	Position
UK Singles (OCC)	143
