= Ready or Not / Everytime =

1999 single by A1

"Ready or Not" / "Everytime"

Single by A1

from the album Here We Come
- B-side: "White Christmas"
- Released: 8 November 1999
- Length: 3:54 ("Ready or Not"); 4:30 ("Everytime")
- Label: Columbia
- Songwriters: Peter Cunnah; Ben Adams; Christian Ingebrigtsen; Paul Marazzi; Mark Read
- Producer: Metro

A1 singles chronology
"Summertime of Our Lives" (1999)	"Ready or Not" / "Everytime" (1999)	"Like a Rose" (2000)

Music videos
- "Ready or Not" on YouTube; "Everytime" on YouTube

"Ready or Not" and "Everytime" are two songs by British-Norwegian boy band A1, both taken from their first album, Here We Come (1999), and released as a double A-side single on 8 November 1999. The single peaked at No. 3 in the United Kingdom while "Everytime" by itself reached the same position in Norway.

== Track listings ==
UK CD1

1. "Everytime" – 4:30
2. "Ready or Not" (Metro club mix) – 5:31
3. "Ready or Not" (Almighty club mix) – 8:07

UK CD2

1. "Ready or Not" – 3:54
2. "Everytime" (acoustic) – 4:15
3. "White Christmas" (acappella) – 1:07

UK cassette single

1. "Everytime" – 4:30
2. "Ready or Not" – 3:54

== Charts ==
=== Weekly charts ===
Chart (1999)	Peak position
Australia (ARIA)	110
Europe (Eurochart Hot 100)	17
Germany (GfK)	91
Norway (VG-lista)	3
Scotland Singles (OCC)	3
Spain Airplay (Top 40 Radio)	29
Sweden (Sverigetopplistan)	56
UK Singles (OCC)	3
UK Airplay (Music Week)	49

=== Year-end charts ===
Chart (1999)	Position
UK Singles (OCC)	125

Chart (2000)	Position
Norway Vinter Period (VG-lista)	4
