= The A List (album) =

Studio album by A1
- Released: 30 October 2000
- Recorded: 1999–2000
- Genre: Pop; dance-pop; R&B
- Length: 52:35
- Label: Columbia
- Producer: Chris Porter, Stevie Bensusen, Claudio Cueni, Graham Stack, Mark Taylor, Riprock 'n' Alex G, Jacques Goldman, Roland Ramonelli, Tom Nichols, Peter Cunnah, Andrew Frampton

A1 chronology
Here We Come (1999)	The A List (2000)	Make It Good (2002)

Singles from The A List
- 1. "Take On Me" Released: 14 August 2000; 2. "Same Old Brand New You" Released: 6 November 2000; 3. "No More" Released: 19 February 2001

Professional ratings
Review scores
Source	Rating
AllMusic	3/5 stars

The A List is the second studio album by British-Norwegian boy band A1. The album was released on 30 October 2000, a week prior to the release of the album's second single, "Same Old Brand New You". The album charted higher than its predecessor, following the number-one charting success of the single "Take On Me". The album was certified as Gold in the UK.

== Track listing ==
No.	Title	Writer(s)	Producer(s)	Length
1.	"Take On Me"	Pal Waaktaar, Magne Furuholmen, Morten Harket	Graham Stack, Mark Taylor	3:31
2.	"Same Old Brand New You"	Eric Foster White, Ben Adams, Christian Ingebrigtsen, Mark Read	White	4:15
3.	"No More"	Stevie Bensusen, Claudio Cueni, Damon Sharpe, Lindy Robbins	Bensusen, Cueni	3:40
4.	"One More Try"	Ingebrigtsen, Adams, Marazzi, Read	Chris Porter	3:29
5.	"The Things We Never Did"	Ingebrigtsen	Porter	4:08
6.	"Too Bad Baby"	Alan Greggs, Barry Daymond, Read, Adams, Ingebrigtsen	Riprock 'n' Alex G	3:04
7.	"Nothing But Trouble"	Andreas Carlsson, Ali Thomson	Riprock 'n' Alex G	3:21
8.	"Tomorrow"	Read, Adams, Ingebrigtsen	Andrew Frampton	3:51
9.	"She Doesn't See Me"	Jean-Jacques Goldman, Roland Romanelli, Adams, Ingebrigtsen, Read, Marazzi	Goldman, Ramonelli	4:27
10.	"Scared"	Read, Gary Read	Stack	3:28
11.	"Celebrate Our Love"	Read	Stack, Gary Miller	3:19
12.	"Living the Dream"	Peter Cunnah, Tom Nichols	Nichols, Cunnah	3:54
13.	"I Wonder Why"	Adams, Ingebrigtsen	Bensusen, Cueni	3:46
14.	"I'll Take the Tears"	Adams, Carol Good	Bensusen, Cueni	4:24
15.	"One in Love"	Adams, Marazzi	Stack	4:13

The A + List: Special Limited Edition Tour Package Bonus Disc
No.	Title	Writer(s)	Producer(s)	Length
1.	"The Beatles Medley"	John Lennon, Paul McCartney	Mirella Breda	3:20
2.	"I Got Sunshine"	Ingebrigtsen, Marazzi	Cunnah, Ingebrigsten	3:41
3.	"Funkin' Up"	Marazzi, Ingebrigtsen, Steve Lee	Gary Miller	3:39
4.	"No More" (Cutfather & Joe Mix)	Bensusen, Cueni, Sharpe, Robbins	Bensusen, Claudio Cueni, Cutfather & Joe	3:40
5.	"Three Times A Lady"	Lionel Richie	Bensusen, Cueni	3:37
6.	"I'll Take the Tears" (Live on the UK2K Tour)	Adams, Good	Bensusen, Cueni	4:24
7.	"Like a Rose" (Heart Mix)	Adams	Mac	4:08
8.	"If You Were My Girl"	Ingebrigtsen	Metro	4:52
9.	"A1 Interview" (Video)			5:00
10.	"Take On Me" (Making of the Video)			2:00
11.	"Same Old Brand New You" (Making of the Video)			2:00
12.	"No More" (Making of the Video)			2:00

== Charts and certifications ==
=== Charts ===
Chart (2000–01)	Peak position
Danish Albums (Hitlisten)	23
European Albums Chart	63
Irish Albums (IRMA)	69
Japanese Albums (Oricon)	92
Norwegian Albums (VG-lista)	4
Scottish Albums (OCC)	10
Singapore Albums (SPVA)	4
UK Albums (OCC)	14

=== Certifications ===
Region	Certification	Certified units/sales
Norway (IFPI Norway)	Platinum	50,000^{*}
United Kingdom (BPI)	Gold	100,000^{^}
^{*} Sales figures based on certification alone.^{^} Shipments figures based on certification alone.

=== Year-end charts ===
Chart (2000)	Peak position
Norwegian Albums Chart (Julen Period)	11
UK Albums (OCC)	78
