= Same Old Brand New You =

2000 single by A1

Single by A1

from the album The A List
- B-side: "Funkin' Up", "One in Love"
- Released: 6 November 2000
- Genre: Pop; dance-pop
- Length: 4:15 (album version); 3:32 (radio edit)
- Label: Columbia
- Songwriters: Eric Foster White, Ben Adams, Christian Ingebrigtsen, Mark Read
- Producer: Eric Foster White

A1 singles chronology
| "Take On Me" (2000) | "Same Old Brand New You" (2000) | "No More" (2001) |

Music video
- "Same Old Brand New You" on YouTube

"Same Old Brand New You" is a song by British-Norwegian boy band A1. It was released on 6 November 2000 as the second single from their second album, The A List. The single was the band's second and final number one single on the UK Singles Chart.

== Background ==
During 2014's The Big Reunion documentary, band member Ben Adams recalls that the writing of this track was the first start of the split between Paul Marazzi and the rest of band. Adams recalled how he, Read, and Ingebrigtsten travelled to New York to work with Eric Foster White on the song but Marazzi did not want to join them and thus missed out on co-songwriting credit for the track. The following year, however, Marazzi denied in an interview that there was a split during these times and said how he loved the track. Marazzi wrote the B-Side, "Funkin' Up".

== Music video ==
A music video directed by Stuart A. Gosling was produced to promote the single. It was shot in Dungeness in Kent, near a nuclear power plant.

== Track listing ==
UK CD1

1. "Same Old Brand New You" (Commercial Version) - 3:43
2. "One in Love" - 4:20
3. "Funkin' Up" - 3:39
4. "Same Old Brand New You" (Video) - 3:43

UK CD2

1. "Same Old Brand New You" (Radio Edit) - 3:30
2. "Funkin' Up" (Extended Mix) - 5:46
3. "Same Old Brand New You" (Almighty 12" Definitive Mix) - 7:32
4. "Funkin' Up" (Video) - 3:39

UK promotional single

1. "Same Old Brand New You" (Radio Edit) - 3:30
2. "Same Old Brand New You" (No Intro) - 3:05

== Charts ==
| Chart (2000-01) | Peak position |
|---|---|
| Australia (ARIA) | 85 |
| Denmark (Tracklisten) | 20 |
| Europe (Eurochart Hot 100) | 10 |
| Ireland (IRMA) | 18 |
| Norway (VG-lista) | 1 |
| Scotland (OCC) | 2 |
| Spain Airplay (Top 40 Radio) | 31 |
| Sweden (Sverigetopplistan) | 15 |
| UK Singles (OCC) | 1 |
| UK Airplay (Music Week) | 38 |

=== Year-end charts ===
| Chart (2000) | Peak position |
|---|---|
| Norwegian Singles Chart (Julen Period) | 1 |
| UK Singles (OCC) | 102 |

== Certifications ==
| Region | Certification | Certified units/sales |
|---|---|---|
| United Kingdom (BPI) | Silver | 200,000^{‡} |
^{‡} Sales+streaming figures based on certification alone.
