= A1 (group) =

English-Norwegian pop group

a1
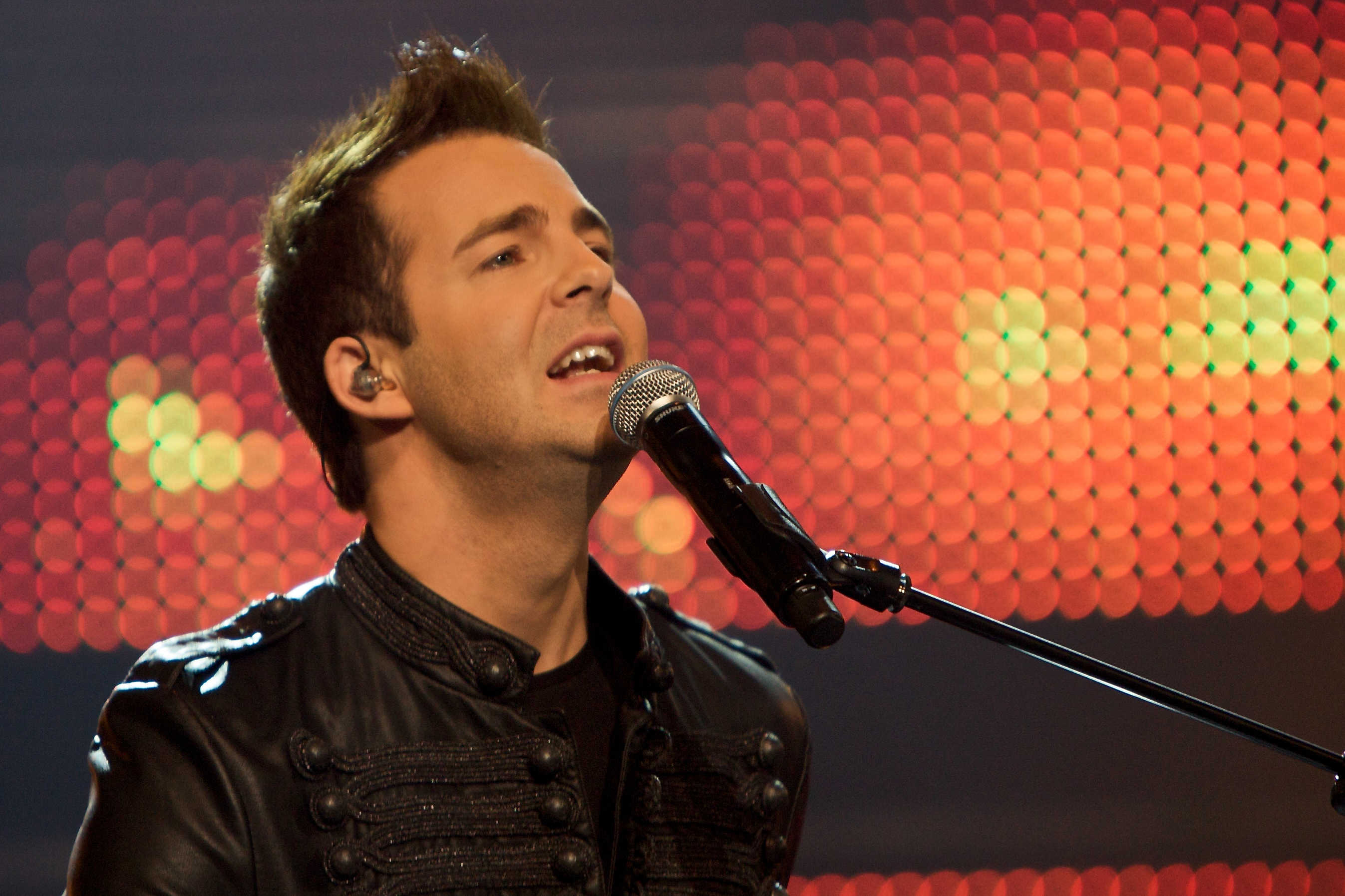
- A1 performing at the Mall of Asia Arena, Philippines on 9 November 2019

Background information
- Origin: London, United Kingdom; Oslo, Norway
- Genres: Pop; pop rock; dance-pop
- Years active: 1998–2002; 2009–present
- Labels: Universal Norway; BMG; Columbia; Rock Taiwan
- Members: Ben Adams; Paul Marazzi; Christian Ingebrigtsen; Mark Read

A1 (stylised as a1) is a British–Norwegian boy group formed in 1998.

Their debut single, "Be the First to Believe", entered the UK singles chart at number six in mid-1999. They achieved chart success in the UK and other parts of the world in the late 1990s and early 2000s, particularly Southeast Asia. In the UK, they scored two number ones and six other top 10 hits, seven of which were written by the group. Adding to this, they won a Brit Award for "British Breakthrough Act" in 2001. They were managed by band manager Tim Byrne, who also formed Steps.

Marazzi left the band in 2002, citing personal reasons. The three remaining members subsequently decided to disband due to exhaustion from being on the road for the best part of four years straight.

In December 2009, Ingebrigtsen, Read and Adams reformed a1, without Marazzi, in Norway for a series of concerts at the Christiania Theatre in Oslo. Since their comeback, they have released new singles as well as their fourth and fifth studio albums, Waiting for Daylight, in 2010, and Rediscovered, in 2012.

In 2014, A1 appeared on the ITV2 documentary The Big Reunion along with other groups such as Eternal, Damage, Girl Thing, 3T and a group called 5th Story, made up of Dane Bowers (from Another Level), Gareth Gates, Kenzie (from Blazin' Squad), Kavana, and Adam Rickitt.

== History ==
=== 1998–1999: Formation and Here We Come ===
Paul Marazzi, who had missed the cut for Steps, met Tim Byrne in 1998 to talk about forming a second group. Auditions were held where Christian Ingebrigtsen, Mark Read, and Ben Adams were recruited and the band was formed by the management team of Byrne and Vicky Blood.

A1 signed with Columbia Records in February 1999 and released "Be the First to Believe" in Summer 1999. In November they released Here We Come, which reached number 4 in Norway and had four top ten singles in the UK.

=== 2000–2002: The A List, Make It Good, Marazzi's departure and split ===
In 2000, they achieved two number ones with "Take On Me" and "Same Old Brand New You". The video for their seventh single, "No More", was filmed in Singapore while they were on tour there. In 2001, the band began a massive arena tour of Asia, where they were very well received. During a mall signing in Indonesia, four teenage girls were killed in a stampede. In 2001, Sony Music launched a paid subscription service for a1 called 'Access All Areas', the first for an artist signed to the company. This was an early version of a social network allowing fans to meet and chat online.

Their third album, Make It Good saw a change of direction in their musical style but was to be their last studio project. On 8 October 2002, Marazzi left the group, citing personal reasons, and a1 subsequently decided to split.

=== 2002–2009: Post A1 and solo careers ===
In January 2004 a Best of A1 album was released in Asia; a compilation featuring all of their singles, two previously unreleased concert recordings, and three exclusive B-Sides. In 2009, following Adams' appearance on Celebrity Big Brother, the band released its Greatest Hits in the UK.

In 2005, Adams went on to release his first solo single, "Sorry", which peaked at number 18 on the UK singles chart. Adams was also due to record an album but parted with his record label. In 2009, he appeared as a contestant on Celebrity Big Brother, eventually placing fifth. He attracted much attention later that same year when he posed naked for the cover of Attitude.

In 2003, Ingebrigtsen also began a solo career, with his first solo single, "In Love With an Angel", being released in 2004. The single stayed in the Top 10 of the Norway Singles Chart for nearly three months. The song was swiftly followed by "Things Are Gonna Change", which became Ingebrigsten's final solo single before he moved into other areas of showbusiness.

In 2002, Read focused on becoming a songwriter for other artists, after signing a deal with Metrophonic. Read has written for artists such as Charlotte Church, Boyzone, Michael Bolton, Robin Gibb, and The Hollies. Read released his debut solo single, "Greatest Lady in My Life", on 2 March 2009. His debut solo album, Peace at Last was released in June 2009.

Months after he left the band, Marazzi hosted the Andy Cole Children's Foundation (now All Star Kids) on 26 April 2003 together with Jo Good. He turned down the offer to appear in I'm a Celebrity...Get Me Out of Here! in 2004. In late 2005 he formed a soul/rock band in Sunderland, Northeast England called Snagsby. He left the band in early 2009. Marazzi then went to work in The George Hotel in Whitby as a club DJ.

=== 2009–2010: Reunion as a trio and Waiting for Daylight ===
In November 2008, the remaining members of the band formed a Myspace account to keep fans updated of their current situation. In summer 2009 the band announced that they to reform and play a series of concerts in Oslo in December of that year. Marazzi posted on his Facebook that he wished them good luck when he found out about his former bandmates' reunion on a TV show in Norway. The announcement also stated that the band's first new single in seven years, "Take You Home", would be released via iTunes in Norway on 2 November. The single entered the Norway Singles Chart at No. 9, based on download sales. It was announced in late 2009 that the band would compete to represent Norway in the 2010 Eurovision Song Contest, with the band's second single since their reformation, "Don't Wanna Lose You Again". The song peaked at No. 4 on the Norwegian Singles Chart. The band reached the national final of the contest and finished in second place. The band made their UK comeback on New Year's Eve by performing at the Heaven New Year's Eve Party in London. In March 2010, the band embarked on a worldwide tour that began in Norway, with performances in Oslo, Stavanger, Kristiansand, Bergen, Trondheim and Haugesund. The tour extended to Europe and ROTW in autumn 2010. The band's first new studio album since 2002 was released on 11 October 2010, and includes the singles "Take You Home", "Don't Wanna Lose You Again", "In Love and I Hate It" and "Waiting for Daylight".

=== 2011–2014: Rediscovered and The Big Reunion ===
In October 2011, the group appeared on Channel 5's OK TV to promote their British comeback gig at the O2 Academy Islington on 31 October 2011. The gig received positive reviews from This Must Be Pop and Time Out. On 18 November 2011, the band released a single, "Another Year Gone". On 28 February 2012, the group performed at the Singapore Indoor Stadium with Blue and Jeff Timmons from 98 Degrees. The concert was entitled "The Greatest Hits Tour: Blue, Jeff Timmons of 98 Degrees and a1 – Live in Singapore." They also visited Jakarta, Indonesia and Manila, Philippines as part of the concert tour. On 8 May 2012, the band announced the release of a new single, "Just Three Words", a duet with Annie Khalid.

In December 2013 it was announced that A1 would be appearing, again without Marazzi, on the ITV2 documentary The Big Reunion. In October 2014, A1 with other bands from the TV show Blue, Five, Damage, 3T, 911 and a new band called 5th Story toured together in October 2014, the tour was called The Big Reunion Boy Band Tour 2014.

On 3 October 2014 A1 performed on the Norwegian show called The Hit, choosing to perform the song "Physical Love" written by Mathilde Johnson, which became the single "Critical Love" after winning.

Their albums Waiting for Daylight and Rediscovered were released in UK on 12 June 2015.

=== 2017–present: Marazzi's return and 20th-anniversary tour ===
A1 gave a concert on 22 October 2016 in Singapore and in Manila and Cebu on 23 and 25 October, respectively.

On 22 July 2017 Paul Marazzi met with his past band-mates in Newcastle. On an Instagram post, the group posted a picture with all four original members Ben Adams, Christian Ingebrigtsen, Mark Read and Paul Marazzi. A follow-up post on the band's Facebook page suggested that they may reform for "One last song.. or 2 or 3".

On 7 May 2018 Ben Adams called BBC Radio 2 host Matt Lucas, announcing A1 would go on a 20th anniversary tour the next year. He said they probably had to do something slightly special for their 20-year reunion, and they had invited original member Paul Marazzi back.

On 23 May 2018, it was announced that they would be doing a set of concerts in Southeast Asia with Marazzi on board.

On 12 October 2018, they released their first single, "Armour", with all members since the departure of Marazzi, and the disbandment of the group, 16 years previously.

On 27 February 2019 the group announced their UK comeback, with their first live show with the original line up in 15 years. The show was held at the O2 Academy Islington, London on 1 November 2019.

In 2021, A1 released their single, "Spiders", which was written by the four band members.

In September 2023, a1 released "Call Me When You Land", a song they wrote during the pandemic, ahead of their Asian a1 Twenty Five tour.

In November 2023, A1 collaborated with Norwegian electronic duo Subwoolfer on the Christmas single "I Think I Killed Rudolph". The song was released on 10 November 2023 through EMI Music Norway, a division of Universal Music, and was featured in the 2023 Norwegian Christmas comedy film There's Something in the Barn. The song was also released as part of the film's soundtrack and appears during the end credits.

On 25 September 2026, a1 released their newest single "In Love in the Philippines" after three years since the last one, it has served as a promotional single for their "Love in the Philippines Tour" that was held from October 16 to 18 in three different locations in the country. The band said that they wrote the song as a love letter for country and their Filipino fans.

== Jakarta mall incident ==
On 18 March 2001, during a mall signing in Mall Taman Anggrek, Jakarta, Indonesia, four teenage girls were killed in a stampede and two others were reported critical. A spokesman for the group said: "They are devastated and are immediately planning to return to Great Britain. They have cancelled the rest of the tour and their thoughts are with the families and friends of those killed and injured."

== Awards and nominations ==
Award	Year	Nominee(s)	Category	Result	Ref.
Hit Awards	2001	A1	Artist of the Year	Won	
Hit Awards	2001	A1	International Group	Nominated	

== Members ==
- Ben Adams (1998–2002, 2009–present)
- Mark Read (1998–2002, 2009–present)
- Christian Ingebrigtsen (1998–2002, 2009–present)
- Paul Marazzi (1998–2002, 2017–present)

== Discography ==
- Here We Come (1999)
- The A List (2000)
- Make It Good (2002)
- Waiting for Daylight (2010)
- Rediscovered (2012)
