= Sam Bailey discography =

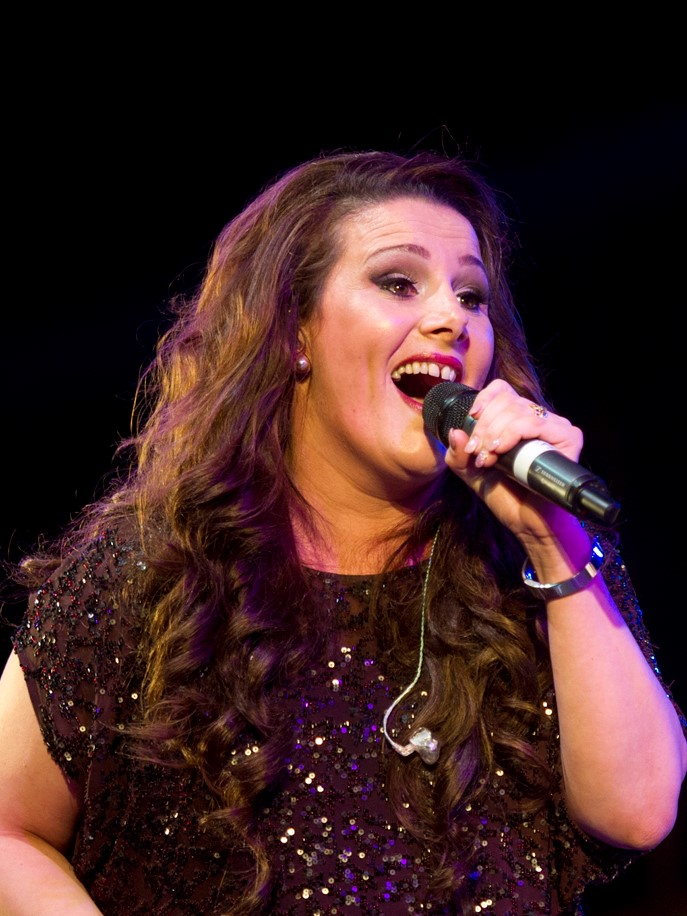
- Bailey performing in Gibraltar, 2015
- Studio albums: 2
- Singles: 6
- Music videos: 3

The discography of Sam Bailey, an English singer, songwriter and musicals actress, consists of two studio albums and six singles. She won the tenth series of The X Factor in 2013. Following her win, her debut single, a cover of Demi Lovato's "Skyscraper" was released on 15 December 2013, achieving the Christmas number one on 22 December 2013. She released her debut studio album, The Power of Love, on 24 March 2014. On 30 March, the album debuted at number one on the UK Albums Chart, making Bailey the first X Factor winner to have a number-one album since Alexandra Burke topped the chart with her debut album Overcome in October 2009. The album sold 72,644 copies in its first week, making it the fastest-selling album of 2014 in the UK at the time, overtaking Pharrell Williams' Girl. The album was re-packaged and re-released on 1 December 2014. The re-issue featured five new tracks - including three Christmas tunes and a reworking of original song "Treasure". As well as the festive songs ("Silent Night", "Please Come Home for Christmas" and "O Holy Night"), the album also included "With You" from Ghost the Musical. On 16 September 2016, she released her second studio album, Sing My Heart Out. The album peaked at number 33 on the UK Albums Chart. The album includes the single "Sing My Heart Out".

== Albums ==
Title	Details	Peak chart positions			Sales	Certifications
Title	Details	UK	IRE	SCO	Sales	Certifications
The Power of Love	Released: 24 March 2014; Label: Syco, Sony; Format: Digital download, CD	1	2	1	UK: 200,000	BPI: Gold
Sing My Heart Out	Released: 16 September 2016; Label: Tiger Drum; Format: Digital download, CD	33	—	53	UK: 8,000	
"—" denotes a recording that did not chart or was not released in that territory.

== Singles ==
Year	Title	Peak chart positions			Certifications & Sales	Album
Year	Title	UK	IRE	SCO	Certifications & Sales	Album
2013	"Skyscraper"	1	1	1	BPI: Silver; UK: 310,000	The Power of Love
2014	"Compass"	—	—	—		The Power of Love
2016	"Sing My Heart Out"	—	—	—		Sing My Heart Out
2017	"Stronger Together" (Note: "Stronger Together" was released in support of the LGBTI people living in fear in Chechnya.)	—	—	—		Non-album singles
2018	"Bleed Red"	—	—	—		Non-album singles
2018	"Take It Out on the Dance Floor" (featuring Rick Live)	—	—	—		Non-album singles
2021	"Black Velvet"	—	—	—		Non-album singles
2022	"Edge of Seventeen"	—	—	—		Non-album singles
2022	"I'd Do Anything for Love (But I Won't Do That)"	—	—	—		Non-album singles
"—" denotes a recording that did not chart or was not released in that territory.

== Other charted songs ==
Year	Title	Peak chart positions	Album
Year	Title	UK	Album
2014	"With You"	147	The Power of Love

== Soundtracks ==
Year	Title	Film
2019	"Wonderful"	High Strung Free Dance

== Other appearances ==
Year	Title	Album	Artist
2015	"River Deep Mountain High"	Sweet Soul Music	The Overtones
2020	"Merry Christmas Everyone"	N/A	The Celebs

== Music videos ==
Year	Title
2013	"Skyscraper"
2016	"Sing My Heart Out"
2018	"Changes" (duet with Steve Steinman)
2021	"Black Velvet"
2022	"Edge Of Seventeen"
2022	"I'd Do Anything for Love (But I Won't Do That)"
