= The Power of Love Tour =

2015 concert tour by Sam Bailey

- Tour by Sam Bailey
- Associated album: The Power of Love
- Start date: 26 January 2015
- End date: 18 February 2015
- Legs: 1
- No. of shows: 18

Sam Bailey concert chronology
- The X Factor Live Tour (2014); The Power of Love Tour (2015); Sing My Heart Out Tour (2017)

The Power of Love Tour was the debut headlining concert tour by English singer Sam Bailey in early 2015. The tour supported Bailey's debut album The Power of Love (2014), which was released after her win on the tenth series of The X Factor in 2013.

== Background ==
Bailey promoted The Power of Love on her first tour, The Power of Love Tour, which visited 17 cities in the United Kingdom with 4 sold out dates and grossed £760,000 with 19,409 attending. The tour was announced on her website and other official outlets. An official announcement stated that Bailey would perform two pre-shows a few days before the official tour start date on 29 January 2015. The tour officially commenced on 29 January with two sold out dates at the De Montford Hall in Leicester, England and ended on 18 February in London.

== Set list ==
This set list is representative of the show on 29 January 2015 in Leicester.

1. "Ain't No Mountain High Enough"
2. "Sunshine on a Rainy Day"
3. "The Power of Love"
4. "No More Tears (Enough Is Enough)"
5. "Superwoman"
6. "Get Here"
7. "From This Moment On" (Shania Twain cover)
8. "How Will I Know"
9. "Through the Fire"
10. "Listen"
11. "Lord Is It Mine"
12. "Clown"
13. "Signed, Sealed, Delivered I'm Yours"
14. "Sisters Are Doin' It for Themselves"
15. "Somebody to Love"
16. "We Close Our Eyes"
17. "To Love You More"
18. "Declaration of Love"
19. "And I Am Telling You I'm Not Going"
20. "Skyscraper"

== Shows ==
Dates
| Date | City | Country | Venue | Opening acts | Attendance | Gross |
Pre-Shows
| 26 January 2015 | Kent | England | Winter Gardens | Daughters of Davis | | |
| 27 January 2015 | Watford | England | Watford Colosseum | Daughters of Davis | | |
Main Tour
| 29 & 30 January 2015 | Leicester | England | De Montfort Hall | Daughters of Davis | 2,972/2,972 (100%) | £123,263 |
| 31 January 2015 | Cardiff | Wales | St David's Hall | Daughters of Davis | 1,320/1,460 (90%) | $54,932 |
| 2 February 2015 | Southend | England | Cliffs Pavilion | Daughters of Davis | 1,582/1,582 (100%) | $64,758 |
| 3 February 2015 | Birmingham | England | Birmingham Symphony Hall | Daughters of Davis | 1,480/1,650 (90%) | $60,319 |
| 4 February 2015 | Nottingham | England | Nottingham Royal Concert Hall | Daughters of Davis | 1,360/1,600 (85%) | $50,404 |
| 6 February 2015 | Liverpool | England | Liverpool Empire | Daughters of Davis | 1,146/1,550 (74%) | $43,559 |
| 7 February 2015 | Glasgow | Scotland | Clyde Auditorium | Daughters of Davis | 1,156/1,520 (76%) | $40,637 |
| 9 February 2015 | Manchester | England | Bridgewater Hall | Daughters of Davis | 1,260/1,520 (83%) | $48,351 |
| 10 February 2015 | Blackpool | England | Blackpool Opera House | Daughters of Davis | 998/1,400 (71%) | $39,505 |
| 11 February 2015 | Gateshead | England | The Sage | Daughters of Davis | 1,003/1,480 (68%) | $40,443 |
| 13 February 2015 | Bath | England | Bath Forum | Daughters of Davis | 950/1,350 (70%) | $30,196 |
| 14 February 2015 | Brighton | England | Brighton Centre | Daughters of Davis | 1,164/1,710 (68%) | $48,266 |
| 15 February 2015 | Oxford | England | New Theatre | Daughters of Davis | 1,002/1,420 (71%) | $38,062 |
| 17 February 2015 | Portsmouth | England | Portsmouth Guildhall | Daughters of Davis | 1,036/1,480 (70%) | $36,865 |
| 18 February 2015 | London | England | Eventim Apollo | Daughters of Davis | 980/1,640 (60%) | $39,354 |
| TOTAL | | | | | 19,409 / 24,334 (80%) | $758,944 |
