= Guilty Pleasures (Didrik Solli-Tangen album) =

Studio album by Didrik Solli-Tangen
- Released: 1 November 2010
- Genre: Pop
- Label: Universal Norway, Class A Records

Singles from Guilty Pleasures
- 1. "My Heart Is Yours" Released: 20 January 2010; 2. "Best Kept Secret" Released: 3 September 2010; 3. "Compass" Released: February 2011

Guilty Pleasures is the first album by Norwegian recording artist Didrik Solli-Tangen, and was released on November 1, 2010. The album's lead single, "My Heart Is Yours", was released on January 20, 2010. On 6 February 2010, it was selected as the Norwegian entry for the Eurovision Song Contest 2010, held in Oslo in May 2010. The second single, "Best Kept Secret" featuring the Norwegian trumpet soloist Tine Thing Helseth, was released on September 3, 2010. At an interview on the day of the album's release date, Solli-Tangen confirmed that "Compass" would be the third single.

== Track listing ==
No.	Title	Length
1.	"Compass"	3:42
2.	"Your Song"	3:17
3.	"Daughters"	3:42
4.	"Nighthawk Diner"	3:58
5.	"Best Kept Secret" (feat. Tine Thing Helseth)	3:25
6.	"When Words Won't Come"	3:37
7.	"You"	3:44
8.	"Released"	3:47
9.	"Next To You"	4:37
10.	"Cold Words"	3:32
11.	"My Heart Is Yours"	3:07

== Charts ==
Chart (2010)	Peak position
Norwegian Albums Chart	28
