= Compass (Mark Vincent song) =

2010 song performed by Mark Vincent

Single by Didrik Solli-Tangen

from the album Guilty Pleasures
- Released: February 2011
- Recorded: 2010
- Genre: Pop
- Length: 3:42
- Label: Universal Norway, Class A
- Songwriter: Diane Warren

Didrik Solli-Tangen singles chronology
"Best Kept Secret" (2010)	"Compass" (2011)

Compass is a song written by Diane Warren and originally recorded by Australian singer Mark Vincent, the winner of the third edition of Australia's Got Talent, for his second studio album of the same name (2010).

"Compass" was later recorded by Norwegian classical recording artist Didrik Solli-Tangen. It was released in February 2011 through Universal Norway as the third and final single from Solli-Tangen's debut studio album Guilty Pleasures (2011). The song failed to chart.

== Track listing ==
Digital download

1. "Compass" - 3:42

== Sam Bailey version ==
"Compass"

Single by Sam Bailey

from the album The Power of Love
- Released: 16 March 2014
- Recorded: 2014
- Genre: Pop
- Length: 3:32
- Label: Syco; Sony
- Songwriter: Diane Warren
- Producers: Graham Stack; Matt Furmidge

Sam Bailey singles chronology
"Skyscraper" (2013)	"Compass" (2014)	"Sing My Heart Out" (2016)

Music video
- "Compass" (Audio) on YouTube

In 2014, "Compass" was recorded by English singer Sam Bailey, the winner of the tenth series of The X Factor. It was released as the second single from her debut studio album The Power of Love on 16 March 2014. The song received its debut airplay on BBC Radio 2 on 18 February 2014. On 24 February, the official audio track was uploaded to YouTube.
