= The Power of Love (Sam Bailey album) =

Studio album by Sam Bailey
- Released: 21 March 2014
- Recorded: 2013–14
- Genre: Soul; R&B
- Length: 41:34
- Label: Syco; Sony
- Producer: Graham Stack; Matt Furmidge; Ray Hedges; Nigel Butler

Sam Bailey chronology
The Power of Love (2014)	Sing My Heart Out (2016)

Singles from The Power of Love
- 1. "Skyscraper" Released: 15 December 2013; 2. "Compass" Released: 16 March 2014

The Power of Love is the debut studio album by English singer Sam Bailey, the winner of the tenth series of The X Factor. It is largely an album of cover versions with the exception of one original song, "Treasure". The album was released on 21 March 2014 via Syco Music and Sony Music.

The album received an overall mixed reception, with some praising Bailey's vocal ability but criticising the lack of original content and questioning her oversinging on certain songs.

A new version of the album, subtitled The Gift Edition, was released on 1 December 2014.

== Background ==
After winning the tenth series of The X Factor on 15 December 2013, Bailey signed a joint record deal with Syco Music and Sony Music. She also released a cover of Demi Lovato's "Skyscraper" as her winner's single on 16 December. On The Xtra Factor after the final results show, judge Gary Barlow said that he would like to write songs for Bailey. In an interview with the Official Charts Company, Bailey said that she wanted to release her debut album in spring 2014, which, with a gap of just three months, would make it 'the fastest album in X Factor history' (although Nicholas McDonald, who was the runner-up to Bailey, ended up releasing his debut album a week earlier than Bailey's, making that the fastest album in X Factor history).

The album was recorded in London in January 2014. On 21 January, Bailey tweeted that her debut album would be called The Power of Love. On 22 January, Bailey appeared at the 19th National Television Awards and sang the album's title track, "The Power of Love". She also performed a duet of "Ain't No Mountain High Enough" with Michael Bolton. During an appearance on The Jonathan Ross Show on 24 January, Bailey announced that she had finished recording The Power of Love earlier that day. On 4 March, a sampler of the album was released on Bailey's official YouTube channel.

== Composition ==
In an interview with Digital Spy, Bailey said "I wanted to do some [cover versions]. It wasn't just them telling me what to do - there were a lot ideas passed across the table. I didn't want to cover any songs by artists that are around at the moment or are current in the charts because I don't think that's right. I wanted to do songs that were inspirational to me back in the day and close to my heart, particularly with my dad..." One of the songs, Supertramp's "Lord Is It Mine", was chosen in memory of Sam's father, Ronnie, who died from cancer in 2008. "It was played at my dad's funeral," she said. "It was his favourite song and I've always wanted to sing it. When I recorded it, I was literally sobbing – I had to turn my microphone around so nobody could see me and shut the curtains."

It had previously been reported that Bailey and Bolton may record a duet for the album. During The X Factor, Bolton extended his UK trip in order to meet her and said he would work with her "in a heartbeat" and would "love to duet" with her. On 29 January, the duo released pictures of themselves recording a duet of "Ain't No Mountain High Enough", and this will be included on the album. Bolton said, "The only thing more important than a great instrument is the ability to put your heart into that instrument. That's what resonates with people, that's what moves human beings and she has that combination." Another duet on the album is "And I Am Telling You" with Nicole Scherzinger, which Bailey originally performed on the X Factor final.

== Singles ==
On 16 December 2013, the day after she won The X Factor, Bailey released a cover of Demi Lovato's "Skyscraper" as her winner's single. On 22 December, the song debuted atop the UK singles chart with first-week sales of 149,000 copies, becoming the Christmas number one. On 30 December, the Official Charts Company revealed that "Skyscraper" was the fifth fastest-selling single of 2013.

On 18 February 2014, the song "Compass" received its debut airplay on BBC Radio 2. The song was previously released in 2010 by classical singers Mark Vincent and Didrik Solli-Tangen. It was released as the second and final single the album on 16 March 2014.

== Critical reception ==
Professional ratings
Review scores
Source	Rating
Female First	2/5 stars
The Independent	2/5 stars
Scunthorpe Telegraph	8/10 stars
Virgin Media	1/5 stars

The album received a mixed reception from critics. Daniel Falconer of Female First gave it two stars out of five. Referring to a duet with Nicole Scherzinger ("And I Am Telling You"), he wrote: "Unfortunately for Sam, [Scherzinger] manages to bring herself to the forefront as she takes the best lines and shows that her ability is a much more honed one. Granted, she's been in the business for quite some time now, but Sam should have put her foot down." In an extremely negative review, Virgin Media's Ian Gittins gave the album 1/5 and called it "the worst album made by an X Factor winner to date."

In a positive review, the Scunthorpe Telegraph wrote, "Obviously cashing in on her success of winning X-Factor Sam's debut album is a commendable effort. But some of her choices have been flogged to death. The ex-prison warder is strong however on emotion and that could make this a best-seller. Her duet with Michael Bolton on 'Ain’t No Mountain High Enough' is the stand-out track."

== Commercial performance ==
On 27 March 2014, the album debuted at number two on the Irish Albums Chart. On 30 March, it went in at number one on the UK Albums Chart, making Bailey the first X Factor winner to have a number one album since Alexandra Burke topped the chart with her debut album Overcome in October 2009. The album sold 72,644 copies in its first week, making it (at the time) the fastest-selling album of 2014 in the UK, the second fastest-selling female solo album, behind Taylor Swift's 1989, and the 41st best-selling album overall. The album has sold 165,711 copies in the UK as of November 2015.

== Track listing ==
- All tracks produced by Graham Stack and Matt Furmidge, except "Ain't No Mountain High Enough" (produced by Stack, Furmidge, Ray Hedges, and Nigel Butler). All vocal production by David Quiñones.

The Power of Love – Standard edition
No.	Title	Writer(s)	Original artist(s)	Length
1.	"The Power of Love"	Gunther Mende; Candy DeRouge; Jennifer Rush; Mary Susan Applegate	Jennifer Rush	4:06
2.	"From This Moment On"	Robert John "Mutt" Lange; Shania Twain	Shania Twain	3:30
3.	"There You'll Be"	Diane Warren	Faith Hill	3:37
4.	"And I Am Telling You" (duet with Nicole Scherzinger)	Tom Eyen; Henry Krieger	Jennifer Holliday (Dreamgirls)	4:20
5.	"Compass"	Diane Warren	Mark Vincent	3:32
6.	"Lord Is It Mine"	Rick Davies; Roger Hodgson	Supertramp	3:54
7.	"Get Here"	Brenda Russell	Brenda Russell	3:17
8.	"Treasure"	Bradford Ellis; Camille Purcell; Jez Ashurst; Richard "Biff" Stannard	Sam Bailey	4:07
9.	"Ain't No Mountain High Enough" (duet with Michael Bolton)	Nickolas Ashford; Valerie Simpson	Marvin Gaye and Tammi Terrell	2:59
10.	"Superwoman"	L.A. Reid; Babyface; Daryl Simmons	Karyn White	4:29
11.	"Skyscraper"	Kerli Kõiv; Lindy Robbins; Toby Gad	Demi Lovato	3:43

The Power of Love – The Gift Edition
No.	Title	Writer(s)	Original artist(s)	Length
8.	"Ain't No Mountain High Enough" (duet with Michael Bolton)	Nickolas Ashford; Valerie Simpson	Marvin Gaye and Tammi Terrell	2:59
9.	"Superwoman"	L.A. Reid; Babyface; Daryl Simmons	Karyn White	4:29
10.	"Skyscraper"	Kerli Kõiv; Lindy Robbins; Toby Gad	Demi Lovato	3:43
11.	"With You"	David A. Stewart; Glen Ballard; Bruce Joel Rubin	Caissie Levy (Ghost the Musical)	4:08
12.	"Please Come Home for Christmas"	Charles Brown; Gene Redd	Charles Brown	2:42
13.	"Treasure" (Christmas mix)	Ellis; Purcell; Ashurst; Stannard	Sam Bailey	4:07
14.	"O Holy Night"	Adolphe Adam; John Sullivan Dwight	Traditional	3:52
15.	"Silent Night"	Franz Xaver Gruber; Joseph Mohr	Traditional	2:27

== Charts and certifications ==
=== Charts ===
Chart (2014)	Peak position
Irish Albums (IRMA)	2
Scottish Albums (OCC)	1
UK Albums (OCC)	1

=== Year-end charts ===
Chart (2014)	Position
UK Albums Chart	41

=== Certifications ===
Region	Certification	Certified units/sales
United Kingdom (BPI)	Gold	168,118

== Release history ==
Region	Date	Format	Version	Label	Ref.
Australia and Europe	21 March 2014	CD; digital download	Standard	Syco; Sony	
Ireland	21 March 2014	CD; digital download	Standard	Syco; Sony	
New Zealand	21 March 2014	CD; digital download	Standard	Syco; Sony	
Europe	24 March 2014	CD; digital download	Standard	Syco; Sony	
Europe	1 December 2014	CD; digital download	The Gift Edition	Syco; Sony	
