= Sam Bailey =

English pop singer (born 1977)

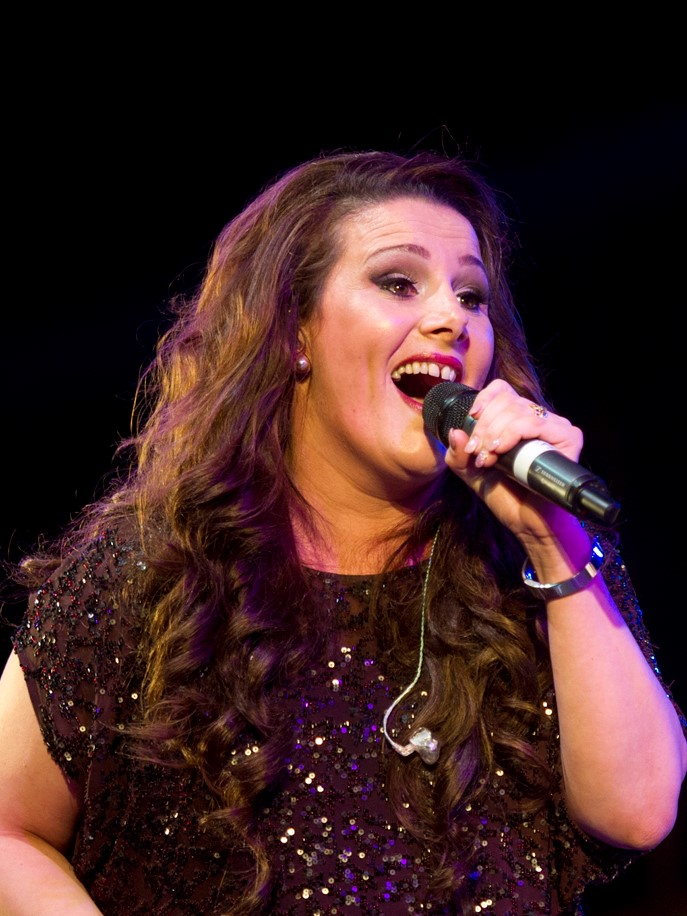
- Bailey in 2015

Background information
- Born: Samantha Florence Bailey; 29 June 1977 (age 49); Bexley, London, England
- Origin: Leicester, England
- Genres: Pop; R&B; soul
- Occupation: Singer
- Years active: 1996, 2013–present
- Labels: CO-OP; Sony; Tiger Drum; Saga Entertainment
- Website: sam-bailey.com

Samantha Florence Bailey (born 29 June 1977) is an English pop singer who won the tenth series of The X Factor in 2013. Following her win, her debut single, a cover of Demi Lovato's "Skyscraper", was released on 15 December 2013, achieving the Christmas number one on 22 December 2013. She was the first X Factor winner in three years to gain the Christmas number one spot.

On 24 February 2014, Bailey supported Beyoncé on one of the dates of her UK leg of The Mrs. Carter Show World Tour, as well as performing on The X Factor Live Tour. Her debut album, The Power of Love, was released in March 2014 and debuted at number one on the UK Albums Chart. The album was re-issued in December 2014 as The Power of Love (The Gift Edition). The re-issue featured five new tracks—including three Christmas covers and a reworking of original song "Treasure". In support of the album, Bailey went on her first headline tour in January and February 2015.

== Early life ==
Bailey was born in Bexley, London, to Ronnie (1950–2008) and Jackie Bailey. She has two brothers, Charlie and Danny. Ronnie died from oral cancer in 2008.

Bailey grew up in Sidcup, London, and attended Cleeve Park School and Bexley College. Before auditioning for The X Factor, she worked as a prison officer at HMP Gartree. near Market Harborough, Leicestershire. In an interview on Daybreak the day after winning, Bailey said that she would quit her job at the Prison.

== Career ==
=== Early career ===
In 1996, then 18-year-old Bailey formed the ska duo Girls Next Door with her friend Julie Nunney and they recorded a song called "Too Late", which was produced by Right Said Fred bassist Clyde Ward. It was reported that Simon Cowell heard the song when he was shopping at his local Asda, but turned the duo down because they were not on television, but Bailey later said that this story was not true.

=== The X Factor (2013) ===
In 2013, Bailey auditioned for the tenth series of The X Factor in front of judges Gary Barlow, Sharon Osbourne, Nicole Scherzinger and Louis Walsh, singing Beyoncé's "Listen" in her room audition. She received a standing ovation from all four judges afterwards, with Barlow calling her voice "incredible". She was given four "yeses" and progressed through to the arena auditions. She sang "Who's Lovin' You" and "Run To You" at the arena, gaining another standing ovation from the audience and bringing Scherzinger to tears. She received four yeses again. Bailey was placed in the "over 25s" category at "bootcamp" and was mentored by Osbourne. She successfully made it through to "judges' houses" and was later chosen by Osbourne for the live shows, along with Lorna Simpson and Shelley Smith.

Following the eliminations of Simpson in week 1 and Smith in week 2, Bailey became the last over 25 in the competition. On 8 December, she made it to the final along with Nicholas McDonald and Luke Friend. On 14 December, she duetted with Scherzinger on "And I Am Telling You I'm Not Going". The following night, she sang her winner's single, a cover of "Skyscraper" by Demi Lovato. Later, having received more than 1 million votes over the course of the weekend, she was announced as the winner. When the voting statistics were announced on The X Factor afterwards, Bailey was revealed to have received the most public votes seven times out of ten. As the winner, she received a £1 million recording contract with Syco Music and the opportunity to support Beyoncé on the UK leg of The Mrs. Carter Show World Tour in February 2014. Bailey was reportedly due to support Beyoncé at ten shows, but that figure was cut down to just one due to The X Factor Live Tour. Her sole show with Beyonce was in Birmingham on 24 February 2014.

A report by The Sun claimed that Bailey had "misled the public" by stating she had no previous singing experience, when in fact she had been performing on cruise ships, in clubs and at music festivals for several years. Bailey defended herself in an interview with the Leicester Mercury, stating: "I have been totally honest that I have sang [sic] for 20 years but never made it. What's the problem with that?" An X Factor executive producer also revealed that Bailey had auditioned for the show's fourth series in 2007, but did not get past the first producers' round.

The X Factor performances and results
Show	Song choice	Theme	Result
Room audition	"Listen" – Beyoncé	—N/a	Through to arena audition
Arena audition	"Who's Lovin' You" – The Jackson 5/"Run To You" – Whitney Houston	—N/a	Through to bootcamp
Bootcamp	"I'm Every Woman" – Whitney Houston	—N/a	Through to six chair challenge
Six chair challenge	"Clown" – Emeli Sandé	—N/a	Through to judges' houses
Judges' houses	"I Have Nothing" – Whitney Houston/"Without You" – Mariah Carey	—N/a	Through to live shows
Live show 1	"The Power of Love" – Jennifer Rush	Songs from the 1980s	Saturday – Safe (1st)
Live show 1	"The Power of Love" – Jennifer Rush	Songs from the 1980s	Sunday – Safe (2nd)
Live show 2	"Make You Feel My Love" – Bob Dylan	Love and heartbreak	Saturday – Safe (2nd)
Live show 2	"Make You Feel My Love" – Bob Dylan	Love and heartbreak	Sunday – Safe (2nd)
Live show 3	"My Heart Will Go On" – Celine Dion	Movie week	Saturday – Safe (1st)
Live show 3	"My Heart Will Go On" – Celine Dion	Movie week	Sunday – Safe (1st)
Live show 4	"No More Tears (Enough Is Enough)" – Barbra Streisand & Donna Summer	Disco	Safe (1st)
Live show 5	"New York, New York" – Liza Minnelli	Big band	Safe (1st)
Live show 6	"Something" – The Beatles	The Great British Songbook	Safe (2nd)
Live show 7	"Bleeding Love" – Leona Lewis	The Best of The X Factor	Safe (1st)
Quarter-Final	"How Will I Know" – Whitney Houston	Musical heroes	Safe (1st)
Quarter-Final	"Clown" – Emeli Sandé	Jukebox	Safe (1st)
Semi-Final	"If I Were a Boy" – Beyoncé	Elton John vs. Beyoncé	Safe (1st)
Semi-Final	"Candle in the Wind" – Elton John	Elton John vs. Beyoncé	Safe (1st)
Final (Saturday)	"The Edge of Glory" – Lady Gaga	No theme	Safe (1st)
Final (Saturday)	"And I Am Telling You I'm Not Going" – Jennifer Hudson (with Nicole Scherzinger)	Celebrity duet	Safe (1st)
Final (Sunday)	"The Power of Love" – Jennifer Rush	Song of the series	Winner
Final (Sunday)	"Skyscraper" – Demi Lovato	Winners single	Winner

=== The Power of Love (2014–2016) ===
Bailey's winner's single "Skyscraper" was released via digital download on 16 December 2013, the day after she won the show. On 18 December 2013, the single received a physical release, which features three of Bailey's best X Factor performances – "The Power of Love", "Make You Feel My Love" and "No More Tears (Enough Is Enough)". On The Xtra Factor after the final, Barlow said that he would like to write songs for Bailey. On 22 December, the song debuted atop the UK Singles Chart after selling 149,000 copies in its first week and became the Christmas number one.

In an interview with the Official Charts Company after "Skyscraper" topped the charts, Bailey said, "2014 is going to be a huge year for me. Basically, I'm in the studio pretty much straight away. We're hoping to get an album out for spring. On the album, I'm going to try and do things a little bit differently." On 21 January 2014, Bailey tweeted that her debut album would be called The Power of Love, named after the Jennifer Rush song which Bailey covered for the album. It was later revealed that the album would be released on 24 March 2014, and contain both cover versions and original material. On 22 January, Bailey appeared at the 19th National Television Awards and sang "The Power of Love". She also performed a duet of "Ain't No Mountain High Enough" with Michael Bolton. This duet is also featured as one of the tracks on the album. Another duet on the album is "And I Am Telling You" with Scherzinger, which Bailey originally performed on the X Factor final.

On 18 February 2014, the song "Compass" received its debut airplay on BBC Radio 2. On 30 March, the album debuted at number one on the UK Albums Chart, making Bailey the first X Factor winner to have a number-one album since Alexandra Burke topped the chart with her debut album Overcome in October 2009. The album sold 72,644 copies in its first week, making it the fastest-selling album of 2014 in the UK at the time, overtaking Pharrell Williams' Girl. In support of the album, Bailey will go on her first headline tour in January and February 2015. The tour will comprise fifteen shows and will begin at the De Montfort Hall in her hometown of Leicester.

The album was re-packaged and re-released on 1 December 2014. The re-issue featured five new tracks — including three Christmas tunes and a reworking of original song "Treasure". As well as the festive songs ("Silent Night", "Please Come Home for Christmas" and "O Holy Night"), the album also included "With You" from Ghost the Musical. In February 2015, it was announced via Bailey's Twitter account that she had parted ways with Syco Music.

=== Sing My Heart Out (2016–2018) ===
In 2016 she was cast as Mamma Morton in the UK tour of the musical Chicago alongside John Partridge and Hayley Tamaddon. Bailey announced on her social media that she had gone to the United States to record her upcoming album. She has been working, among others, with Steve Dorff, writing new songs for an album titled Sing My Heart Out, released on 16 September. The album charted on the Top 40 in the UK on its first week. Sam is co-writer of most of the songs in this new album.

During the summer holidays in 2016 Bailey toured Butlins Holiday Resorts as part of the Butlins Pop tour 2016. Bailey took centre stage at De Montfort Hall as Queen of the Flower of Fairies in Jack and the Beanstalk at the 2016 Christmas pantomime, next to Jon Clegg.

=== Theatre and new music (2018–present) ===
In 2018, it was announced that Bailey would be stepping into the role of Betty Simpson in Fat Friends – The Musical. Bailey then joined the charitable music project "Stronger Together" to support of LGBTI people living in fear in Chechnya.

Bailey then starred in the Vampires Rock Musical tour, and in July, Bailey released "Bleed Red". Her song "Wonderful" was later part of the original soundtrack of the film High Strung: Free Dance.

In 2020, amid the COVID-19 crisis Sam joined a supergroup of celebrities called The Celebs, the group included Frank Bruno, Kellie Shirley and Toby Anstis to raise money for both Alzheimer's Society and Action for Children. They recorded a new rendition of Merry Christmas Everyone by Shakin' Stevens and it was released digitally on 11 December 2020, on independent record label Saga Entertainment. The music video debuted exclusively on Good Morning Britain the day before release. The song peaked at number two on the iTunes pop chart.

In 2021 Bailey penned a record deal with independent record label Saga Entertainment, she released her first single on the label on 6 August 2021, a cover of Alannah Myles hit single Black Velvet. The song peaked at number one on the Amazon best sellers chart and number 3 on the iTunes rock charts. In 2024, she was cast in the theatre production Now! That's What I Call a Musical, playing the role of April. The production began across the United Kingdom in early 2025.

== Personal life ==
Bailey currently lives in Leicester with her husband Craig Pearson, their three children—Tommy, Brooke, and Miley, and their deaf Springer Spaniel, Molly. Bailey and Pearson met in 2002 and were married in Las Vegas on 29 January 2003.

On 6 March 2014, Bailey announced that she was 10 weeks pregnant with her third child. She tweeted her first ultrasound scan, alongside the caption "Hey everyone...... Meet peanut!!!" At 10:50am on 10 September 2014, Bailey gave birth to daughter Miley Beau. Former mentor and friend Sharon Osbourne is Miley's godmother. In October 2014, Bailey announced via Twitter she is suffering Bell's palsy following Miley's birth.

Bailey is a fan of her local football club, Leicester City.

In June 2014, Bailey announced that she had signed a deal to release her autobiography Daring to Dream. It was released in November 2014.

== Discography ==
- The Power of Love (2014)
- Sing My Heart Out (2016)

== Tours ==
=== Co-headlining ===
- The X Factor Live Tour (2014)
- Butlins Pop Tour 2016 (2016)

=== Headlining ===
- The Power of Love Tour (2015)
- Sing My Heart Out Tour (2017)
- Sam Bailey in Concert Tour (2018)

=== Supporting ===
- The Mrs. Carter Show World Tour (2014)

== Stage credits ==
- Chicago (2016) As Mama Morton
- Fat Friends (2017–2018)
- Vampires Rock (2019)
- 42nd Street (2019)
- Beauty and the Beast (2022)
- Everybody's Talking About Jamie (2024)
- Now That's What I Call a Musical (2025)

Awards and achievements
Preceded by James Arthur	Winner of The X Factor; 2013	Succeeded by Ben Haenow
