= Skyscraper (song) =

2011 single by Demi Lovato

Single by Demi Lovato

from the album Unbroken
- B-side: "Rascacielo" (Spanish version of "Skyscraper")
- Released: July 12, 2011
- Recorded: 2010
- Studio: Strawberrybee Studios (Los Angeles)
- Genre: Pop
- Length: 3:42
- Label: Hollywood
- Songwriters: Toby Gad; Lindy Robbins; Kerli Kõiv
- Producer: Toby Gad

Demi Lovato singles chronology
"Wouldn't Change a Thing" (2010)	"Skyscraper" (2011)	"Give Your Heart a Break" (2012)

Music video
- "Skyscraper" on YouTube

"Skyscraper" is a song recorded by the American singer Demi Lovato for her third album, Unbroken (2011). The song was released by Hollywood Records on July 12, 2011, as the album's lead single. Toby Gad, Lindy Robbins, and Kerli wrote it, and Gad produced it. American singer Jordin Sparks provided background vocals. It was inspired by a picture of the apocalypse, in which the world was in ruins and, among collapsed buildings, one skyscraper was standing.

When "Skyscraper" was recorded, Lovato was emotional which triggered outbursts and caused her to start crying. On November 1, 2010, she entered a treatment facility to deal with her personal struggles, and was later diagnosed with bipolar disorder. After completing treatment on January 28, 2011, Lovato re-recorded the song, but kept the original as she felt it was symbolic. Musically, it is a pop ballad with lyrics about staying strong and believing in oneself. A Spanish version of the song, alternatively titled "Rascacielo", was released on August 16, 2011. In 2023, Lovato re-recorded "Skyscraper" and included it on her first remix album, Revamped.

Mark Pellington directed the music video for "Skyscraper", which premiered on July 13, 2011; it features Lovato wearing a white dress on a desert road. The song was included on the set lists of her concert tours starting with A Special Night with Demi Lovato (2011–2013). Commercially, it debuted and peaked at number 10 on the Billboard Hot 100. "Skyscraper" sold 176,000 digital downloads in the first week of release in the United States, setting a sales record for Lovato. Internationally, the song reached the Top 10 in the United Kingdom and New Zealand as well as the Top 20 in Canada, Denmark, and Ireland. It has sold over 1.6 million digital downloads in The United States and has been certified triple Platinum by the Recording Industry Association of America (RIAA).

== Background ==
"Skyscraper" was written by Toby Gad, Lindy Robbins and Estonian singer Kerli Kõiv and produced by Gad. Kõiv said they wrote the song while drawing inspiration from a picture of the apocalypse. In an interview with Seventeen, Kõiv elaborated on the picture, stating, "The world was in ruins and in the middle of all the collapsed buildings was one skyscraper still standing tall. It was slightly raining and the first rays of sun were starting to shine through thick clouds of smoke. I was actually feeling amazing when I wrote it. It came from a really empowered place." Kõiv revealed that the song is also personal to her, stating, "I come from a very small place in Eastern Europe so my whole life has kind of been one big fight to live my dream against all odds. But I think it's hard to be a human in general—we all have our own struggles and things to overcome." When asked what she wants girls to feel when they hear the song, Kerli said, "I think the lyrics say it already. You can hit the lowest low and face the darkest dark, but you can always get back up and get in the light." Kõiv recorded a demo version of the song before Gad offered the song to Lovato. Lovato wanted to record the song because the singer felt a "huge emotional attachment to it" and believed both Lovato and her fans could relate to it. Lovato explained the rest of Unbroken is "a lot lighter and more fun" and they chose to release "Skyscraper" as the first single from the album because they wanted to show "something very inspirational" that represents the difficult journey Lovato had been on.

American singer Jordin Sparks provided backing vocals on the song. Lovato said that she kept Sparks' vocals because "it adds a lot to the song". Lovato stated, "I think she may have recorded it once maybe and I don't really know what the situation was, but I know she did the background vocals and they were lovely".

== Recording ==
"[Lovato] [has] the range, the full emotional spectrum, incredible control… Vocally, she is the best thing Disney's had since Christina Aguilera."

— Producer Toby Gad on Demi Lovato's vocals

Initially, Lovato recorded "Skyscraper" in Studio City, Los Angeles in 2010. During recording sessions, Lovato was "doubled over, just in pain." Lovato had never recorded a song that made her that emotional, and according to E! News, while recording, her voice was damaged from purging. At the time, Lovato had not told anyone about her struggles—the singer describes the song as a "cry for help" for her in that moment. On November 1, 2010, Lovato entered a treatment facility to treat her physical and emotional problems.

After completing treatment on January 28, 2011, Lovato re-recorded the song, but decided to keep the original recording because the singer felt that her voice had changed, although noting that her voice was "weaker" when Lovato originally recorded. Lovato said, "There was something in that first try, that first run through of the song that was kind of magical. It was so much emotion in it, and to this day, it’s still really special to me." Lovato called the original take "symbolic" and said that "it was providing a message". Kõiv praised Lovato's version of the song, stating it "really conveys the emotion". Kerli continued: "I always say that songs are messages and artists are messengers, and at this point in time there is no better messenger for this song than Demi. Her courage to go out and tell the whole world about everything she's been through the past year is beyond inspiring."

== Release ==
Lovato revealed the cover artwork and release date of "Skyscraper" on her Twitter account on July 5, 2011. Following the announcement, "Skyscraper" became a trending topic on the site. On July 12, 2011, in an interview of On Air with Ryan Seacrest, Lovato was called in to talk about the track. The same day, the song was made available for digital download on the iTunes Store in the United States, although originally planned to be released on July 14, 2011.

The song reached the top ten on the iTunes chart within an hour, and it summited the chart later in the afternoon. The song was serviced for mainstream radio airplay on July 26, 2011. Soon after, Lovato recorded a Spanish version of the track, named "Rascacielo". It was released on the Mexican iTunes store on August 16, 2011.

After the song was released, many celebrities voiced their support of "Skyscraper" on Twitter. In response, Lovato stated "There has been so much positive feedback, it's been so incredible. I hear that people like Katy Perry and Kelly Clarkson respect my music and are even tweeting about it on their own time. I mean, it's just been so amazing and I've been so thankful and grateful. It's just so exciting for me, because these are people I look up to myself and then hearing that they're tweeting about me; it's like a dream come true." According to The Hollywood Reporter, other celebrities such as The Veronicas, Selena Gomez, Lucy Hale, Kim Kardashian, Jordin Sparks, Ashley Tisdale and Pete Wentz, among others also contributed to the praise.

Jordin Sparks, who provided backing vocals on the track, posted a video of herself singing the song on her website. Lovato called Sparks' take "beautiful".

== Composition ==
Demi Lovato – "Skyscraper"
"Skyscraper" is a pop ballad with lyrics focusing on "staying strong and believing in yourself". In the chorus, Lovato's quivering vocals are accompanied by breathy backing vocals and heavy percussion.

"Skyscraper" is a pop ballad in which Lovato showcases breathy, quivering and powerful vocals. In the first verse, Lovato is only accompanied by a lonely, pulsing piano as Lovato sings, "Skies are crying, I am watching catching teardrops in my hands/ Only silence, as it's ending, like we never had a chance". As the song progresses, the piano is accompanied by heavy percussion and breathy backing vocals. In the chorus, Lovato sings, "You can take everything I have/ You can break everything I am/ Like I'm made of glass, like I'm made of paper/ Go on and try and tear me down/ I will be rising from the ground like a skyscraper". In the second verse, Lovato "begins to find more strength".

The song has a simple musical structure. According to the sheet music published on Musicnotes.com by EMI Music Publishing, the song is set in common time with a metronome of 104 beats per minute. It is composed in the key of G major with Lovato's vocal range spanning from the low note of G_{3} to the high note of G_{5}.

Lyrically, the song represents staying strong and believing in yourself. According to Lovato, the song's lyrics symbolize her personal journey from where she used to be to "the happy healthy person she is today." The song deals with the difficulties Lovato had been through the past year and overcoming the obstacles she faced. With the song, Lovato hopes that "people are able to relate to it and realize that they are able to rise above and overcome any obstacle, no matter the circumstances and shine like a skyscraper".

== Critical reception ==
Upon release, "Skyscraper" received positive reviews from music critics. While reviewing Unbroken, many critics described "Skyscraper" as the most emotional and vulnerable track on the record, including Rolling Stone's Monica Herrera, Sputnikmusic's Raul Stanciu, and AllMusic's Stephen Thomas Erlewine. Herrera described the ballad as "tear-jerker", while Stanciu complimented its sincerity, and wrote that it "easily strikes a chord with any listener". Jason Lipshutz of Billboard praised Lovato's powerful vocal range on the track, and described it as "somber". Grady Smith for Entertainment Weekly also lauded her vocals and called the song "inspiring". PopCrush reviewer Jessica Sager received the song positively and said that it was Lovato's breakout hit, "with good reason".

At the 2011 edition of the Teen Choice Awards, the single won the award for the category Choice Summer Song. In the following year, the music video for "Skyscraper" won the category Best Video with a Message at the 2012 MTV Video Music Awards. For MTV, James Montgomery named "Skyscraper" as one of the 25 best songs of 2011, and praised its final "chill-inducing" chorus. In rankings of Lovato's entire music catalog, the song was placed among her ten best songs by Billboard and American Songwriter, which ranked it at number five and number nine, respectively. At the end of 2019, the staff of the former named "Skyscraper" as one of the 100 songs that defined the 2010s decade, and Lipshutz affirmed that it transformed Lovato into "a respected adult pop voice and prolific hitmaker". In 2024, Los 40 included "Skyscraper" on its list of songs that defined the singer's career.

== Chart performance ==
In the United States, "Skyscraper" debuted at its peak of number ten on the Billboard Hot 100. It sold 176,000 paid digital downloads during the first week of release, becoming Lovato's highest first-week sales, as well as the singer's highest-peaking single in the country since "This Is Me" which reached number nine in August 2008. It remained as Lovato's highest first-week sales of her career up until the release of Heart Attack" by Lovato in 2013.

In Canada, "Skyscraper" debuted at number 18 on the Canadian Hot 100. As of August 1, 2011, the song entered the New Zealand Singles Chart at number nine—making it her highest debut and peaking single there at the time. On August 7, 2011, "Skyscraper" debuted on the Australian Singles Chart at number ninety-two, and it reached its peak of forty-five the following week.

"Skyscraper" entered the UK Singles Chart at number thirty-two on March 4, 2012. It sold 11,460 copies, marking Lovato's highest charting song in the UK at the time and the singer's third top forty entry there. On September 29, 2013, over a year after the original release date, the song re-entered at a new peak of number thirteen. It has since reached number seven on October 7, 2013, earning Lovato her second UK top ten single.

== Music video ==
=== Background ===
There were so many things that represented my addictions and eating disorders and self-harm. When I'm unraveling this black fabric...It was the toxicity took over my mind for so long, that oozed out of every pore that I had because I was suffering inside...I'm taking it off and walking on broken glass and powering through it.

— Demi Lovato to E! News on the video's content and inspiration.

The music video was directed by Mark Pellington. Lovato's management sent the singer different video treatments for the song, including one from Pellington. Lovato based her decision on choosing his idea due to him being "really respected as a director". Lovato said, "he had a great way of really interpreting the song into a video and I was just really thankful that he did such a great job. But he is such an incredible artist and he really knew how to interpret that into a incredible video." The video was shot in the middle of the Bonneville Salt Flats desert. Lovato wanted to keep the video shoot "really intimate, because it needed to be for the song". The shoot, which took twelve hours, was "both physically and mentally tough" for Lovato; the singer would "break down and cry" between takes because of the song being so personal to her. On set, Lovato and Pellington were accompanied by the hair and make-up artists and Lovato's management. Due to the lack of people involved, Lovato felt that it was "pretty easy to get to that emotional place" that was needed for the song. Lovato also wanted to give the video an "emotionally raw feel", stating, "That video was an emotional release for me, like therapy... I kept crying, I was so emotionally invested...That's when I realized, that's what music videos are all about." The video represents Lovato's personal struggles in the past years, including her former eating disorder and cutting and how she overcame them.

=== Synopsis ===
Lovato as she wanders through the desert in the music video for "Skyscraper".

The video begins with Lovato walking towards the camera on a desert road in Bonneville Salt Flats while wearing a long white dress. A close-up shot of Lovato's face serves as the main portion of the video, throughout the first verse. In the first chorus, a glass heart enclosed in a glass box is shown, surrounded by fog, and Lovato continues to walk down the road. In the second verse, Lovato is surrounded by a black fabric that represents the "toxicity" that took over her mind in the past. Then, Lovato is seen walking over broken glass, which represents her "taking [the toxicity] off" and "powering through it".

In the second chorus, Lovato begins to find more strength—represented by the one shot showing her standing inside a photograph frame. In the bridge, the glass box, with the heart inside, is hit, and the surface breaks. That is followed by more scenes Lovato walking over the broken glass, and as the song fades, the last scene is closes in on Lovato's face.

=== Release and reception ===
The music video premiered on July 13, 2011, on E!, and it was released by Vevo, the following day. Soon after the premiere, Lovato spoke with Ryan Seacrest in an exclusive interview. The video was met with a positive reception. James Montgomery of MTV News was very positive on the video—especially the scene when Lovato looks into the camera and almost breaks into tears. Montgomery said, "I'm not sure if [Lovato is] acting or not, but I doubt it, and really, it's not like it matters. Not when a singer connects to a song on such a visceral level, especially one who's already been through the wringer." He concluded, "there's some dramatically billowing fabrics and some shattered glass, but really, the song is the star. And that simplicity is perfect here, because the song provides all the pyrotechnics necessary."

Grady Smith of Entertainment Weekly praised the video for being simple, saying "There are no electric guitars or goofy story lines here—just simple, raw passion." Melina Newman of HitFix said that "no one else appears in the Mark Pellington-directed clip as the focus is clearly on showing the pain [Lovato has] gone through and from which she is rising, not like the proverbial phoenix, but like a skyscraper." Newman praised Pellington for bringing "a sense of intimacy to the clip despite the often wide-open spaces".

== Live performances ==
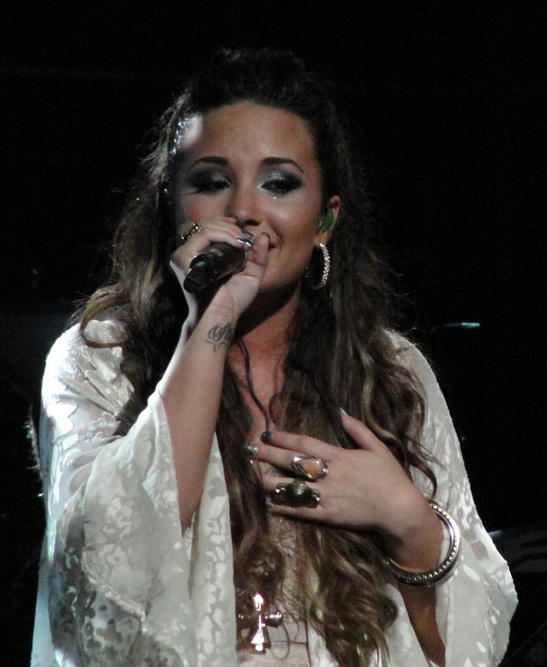
Lovato performing "Skyscraper" in Los Angeles.

On August 18, 2011, Lovato first performed "Skyscraper" at the Do Something Awards on VH1, marking the singer's first live performance since she had left the Jonas Brothers: Live in Concert tour to enter the treatment facility. She performed the song on the ALMA Award in Santa Monica, California, on September 11, 2011. The artist performed it mostly in English, while singing the Spanish version of the track on the second verse, with help of a teleprompter. In 2018, it was ranked by Billboard's Abby Jones as one of her best awards show live performances. During September 2011, Lovato also sang "Skyscraper" on Good Morning America and the Ellen DeGeneres Show. It was included on the set list of her second headlining concert tour, A Special Night with Demi Lovato (2011–2013).

Lovato performed "Skyscraper" in 2012, along with other songs present on her first three albums, at an "Intimate Performance" presented and published by Vevo. It was also added to the regular set list of her subsequent concert tours in the same decade: the Neon Lights Tour in 2013, the Demi World Tour in 2013 and 2014, the Future Now Tour in 2016, and the Tell Me You Love Me World Tour in 2018.

In 2020, the singer performed "Skyscraper" at the special iHeart Living Room Concert for America in response to the COVID-19 pandemic. Lovato included the single on the set list of her Holy Fvck Tour in 2022, in promotion of her eighth studio album, Holy Fvck (2022). She also performed it at several festivals between 2022 and 2023, including the Town Festival in September 2023.

== Track listing ==
"Skyscraper" – Digital download

1. "Skyscraper" – 3:43
2. "Skyscraper" (instrumental) – 3:39

"Rascacielo" – Digital download

1. "Rascacielo" – 3:42

== Credits and personnel ==
Recording and management

- Vocals Recorded at Strawberrybee Studios (Los Angeles)
- Mastered at Capitol Mastering (Los Angeles)
- GadSongs/EMI Music Publishing North America/AU; Gad Songs/BMG Europe/Asia (ASCAP); Hey Kiddo Music (ASCAP), administered by Kobalt Music Group, Ltd.; Tiny Cute Monster (BMI)
- Jordin Sparks appears courtesy of 19 Recordings, Ltd./Jive Records, a unit of Sony Music Entertainment

Personnel

- Demi Lovato – lead vocals, backing vocals
- Toby Gad – songwriting, production, mixing, all instruments, programming
- Lindy Robbins – songwriting
- Kerli Koiv – songwriting
- Jordin Sparks – additional backing vocals
- Robert Vosgien – mastering

Credits adapted from Unbroken liner notes.

== Charts ==
=== Weekly charts ===
Chart (2011–13)	Peak position
Australia (ARIA)	45
Belgium (Ultratip Flanders)	44
Brazil (Billboard Hot 100)	28
Brazil (Billboard Hot Pop Songs)	2
Canada Hot 100 (Billboard)	18
Denmark (Tracklisten)	20
Euro Digital Songs (Billboard)	13
Finland Download (Latauslista)	12
Germany (Media Control Charts)	78
Ireland (IRMA)	15
New Zealand (Recorded Music NZ)	9
Scottish Singles Sales (Official Charts)	6
Slovakia Airplay (ČNS IFPI)	70
Switzerland (Schweizer Hitparade)	67
UK Singles (Official Charts)	7
US Billboard Hot 100	10
US Adult Pop Airplay (Billboard)	27
US Pop Airplay (Billboard)	33

=== Year-end charts ===
Chart (2011)	Position
Brazil (Billboard Hot 100)	64
Chart (2012)	Position
Brazil (Billboard Hot 100)	75
Chart (2013)	Position
UK Singles (Official Charts Company)	159

== Certifications ==
Region	Certification	Certified units/sales
Australia (ARIA)	2× Platinum	140,000^{‡}
Brazil (Pro-Música Brasil)	Platinum	60,000^{‡}
Denmark (IFPI Danmark)	Gold	45,000^{‡}
New Zealand (RMNZ)	Platinum	15,000^{*}
United Kingdom (BPI)	Platinum	600,000^{‡}
United States (RIAA)	3× Platinum	3,000,000^{‡}
^{*} Sales figures based on certification alone.^{‡} Sales+streaming figures based on certification alone.

== Release history ==
Country	Release date	Format(s)
United States	July 12, 2011	Digital download
United States	July 26, 2011	Mainstream airplay
Australia	November 2, 2011	Digital download
New Zealand	November 2, 2011	Digital download
United Kingdom	February 26, 2012	Digital download
United Kingdom	October 28, 2013	Re-release; contemporary hit radio

== Sam Bailey version ==
"Skyscraper"

Single by Sam Bailey

from the album The Power of Love
- Released: December 16, 2013
- Recorded: 2013
- Genre: Pop
- Length: 3:40
- Label: Syco; Sony
- Songwriters: Toby Gad; Lindy Robbins; Kerli Kõiv
- Producers: Graham Stack; Matt Furmidge

Sam Bailey singles chronology
"Skyscraper" (2013)	"Compass" (2014)

In December 2013, Sam Bailey, winner of the tenth series of The X Factor, released a cover version of "Skyscraper" as her winner's single. The single was the 2013 Christmas number-one single on the UK Singles Chart. All proceeds from the single go to the Great Ormond Street Hospital and Together for Short Lives.

=== Live performances ===
On December 15, 2013, Bailey performed the song live on The X Factor final, competing against Nicholas McDonald. She also performed the song on January 25, 2014, during her live appearance on The Jonathan Ross Show.

=== Critical reception ===
Lewis Corner of Digital Spy gave the song a positive review by stating:

As we've been reminded numerous times over the past few months, The X Factor celebrated its tenth series this year, and for it the public decided Sam Bailey should release its tenth winner's single. The annual release has faced its ups and downs over the past decade, with any number of Facebook campaigns, novelty singles and festive anthems attempting to thwart its victory. But it generally feels this year that Sam, who was working as a prison officer at the start of the year, has even charmed over the more vociferous members of the public. "You can take everything I have/ You can break everything I am," Sam declares on 'Skyscraper', showcasing her impressive range that has astonishingly gone unnoticed for the past two decades. While diehard fans of Demi Lovato's original will argue that there's clear emotion attached to her version, there's no doubt Sam's 'working mum to popstar' transformation that we've been witness to over the past few months adds her own endearing perspective to the cover. And with a freshly-signed record deal being handed in at Sony HQ this morning, it's a journey we are more than intrigued to see play out over the next 12 months.

Lovato also praised Bailey's version of the song. Writing on Twitter, she said: ""Congratulations @SamBaileyREAL on winning X Factor UK!! Love your version of Skyscraper!"

=== Chart performance ===
On December 18, 2013, the song entered ahead of "Happy" by Pharrell Williams at number one on the Official Chart Update in the UK. On December 19, it entered the Irish Singles Chart at number one, and it remained there for a second week, becoming the New Year's number one as well. In its third week, however, the song fell to number five.

On December 20, it was revealed that the song had so far sold 107,000 copies (68,000 ahead of "Happy") and was on course to become the UK Christmas number one. On December 22, "Skyscraper" debuted at number one with sales of 148,853 copies. Despite more than doubling the sales of closest competitor "Happy" (63,858), it produced the second-lowest first-week sales of any X Factor winner's single; the lowest was Steve Brookstein's version of Phil Collins' "Against All Odds". It was, however, the fifth fastest-selling single of 2013 in the UK.

=== Track listing ===
Digital download
No.	Title	Writer(s)	Producer(s)	Length
1.	"Skyscraper"	Toby Gad, Kerli Kõiv, Lindy Robbins	Graham Stack, Matt Furmidge	3:40

UK CD single
No.	Title	Writer(s)	Producer(s)	Length
1.	"Skyscraper"	Gad, Kõiv, Robbins	Stack, Furmidge	3:40
2.	"The Power of Love" (The X Factor performance)	Gunther Mende, Candy DeRouge, Jennifer Rush, Mary Susan Applegate	Stack, Furmidge	TBA
3.	"Make You Feel My Love" (The X Factor performance)	Bob Dylan	Stack, Furmidge	TBA
4.	"No More Tears (Enough Is Enough)" (The X Factor performance)	Paul Jabara, Bruce Roberts	Stack, Furmidge	TBA

=== Charts and certifications ===
==== Weekly charts ====
Chart (2013)	Peak position
Ireland (IRMA)	1
Scottish Singles Sales (Official Charts)	1
UK Singles (Official Charts)	1

==== Year-end charts ====
Chart (2013)	Position
UK Singles (Official Charts Company)	84

==== Certifications ====
Region	Certification	Certified units/sales
United Kingdom (BPI)	Silver	310,000

=== Release history ===
Country	Release date	Format	Label
Ireland	December 16, 2013	Digital download	Syco, Sony
United Kingdom	December 16, 2013	Digital download	Syco, Sony

== See also ==
- List of Billboard Hot 100 top 10 singles in 2011
- List of UK top 10 singles in 2013
- List of UK Singles Chart number ones of the 2010s
