= Sing My Heart Out =

Studio album by Sam Bailey
- Released: 16 September 2016
- Genre: Pop
- Length: 39:33
- Label: Tiger Drum

Sam Bailey chronology
The Power of Love (2014)	Sing My Heart Out (2016)

Singles from Sing My Heart Out
- 1. "Sing My Heart Out" Released: 9 September 2016

Sing My Heart Out is the second studio album by English singer Sam Bailey. It was released on 16 September 2016 by Tiger Drum. The album's lead single, "Sing My Heart Out", was released on 9 September 2016.

== Track listing ==
No.	Title	Length
1.	"Sing My Heart Out"	3:38
2.	"Echo"	3:20
3.	"Don't Cry for Me"	3:12
4.	"Never Again"	3:23
5.	"Take It out on the Dancefloor"	3:13
6.	"Forgive and Forget"	4:26
7.	"Never Give Up"	3:36
8.	"No Greater Love"	4:00
9.	"No Tomorrow"	3:40
10.	"It Gets Better Every Day"	3:17
11.	"Sun Above the Clouds"	3:50
Total length:		39:33

== Charts ==
Chart (2016)	Peak position
Scottish Albums (Official Charts)	53
UK Albums (Official Charts)	33
UK Album Downloads (Official Charts)	44
UK Independent Albums (Official Charts)	9
