= Didrik Solli-Tangen =

Norwegian singer (born 1987)

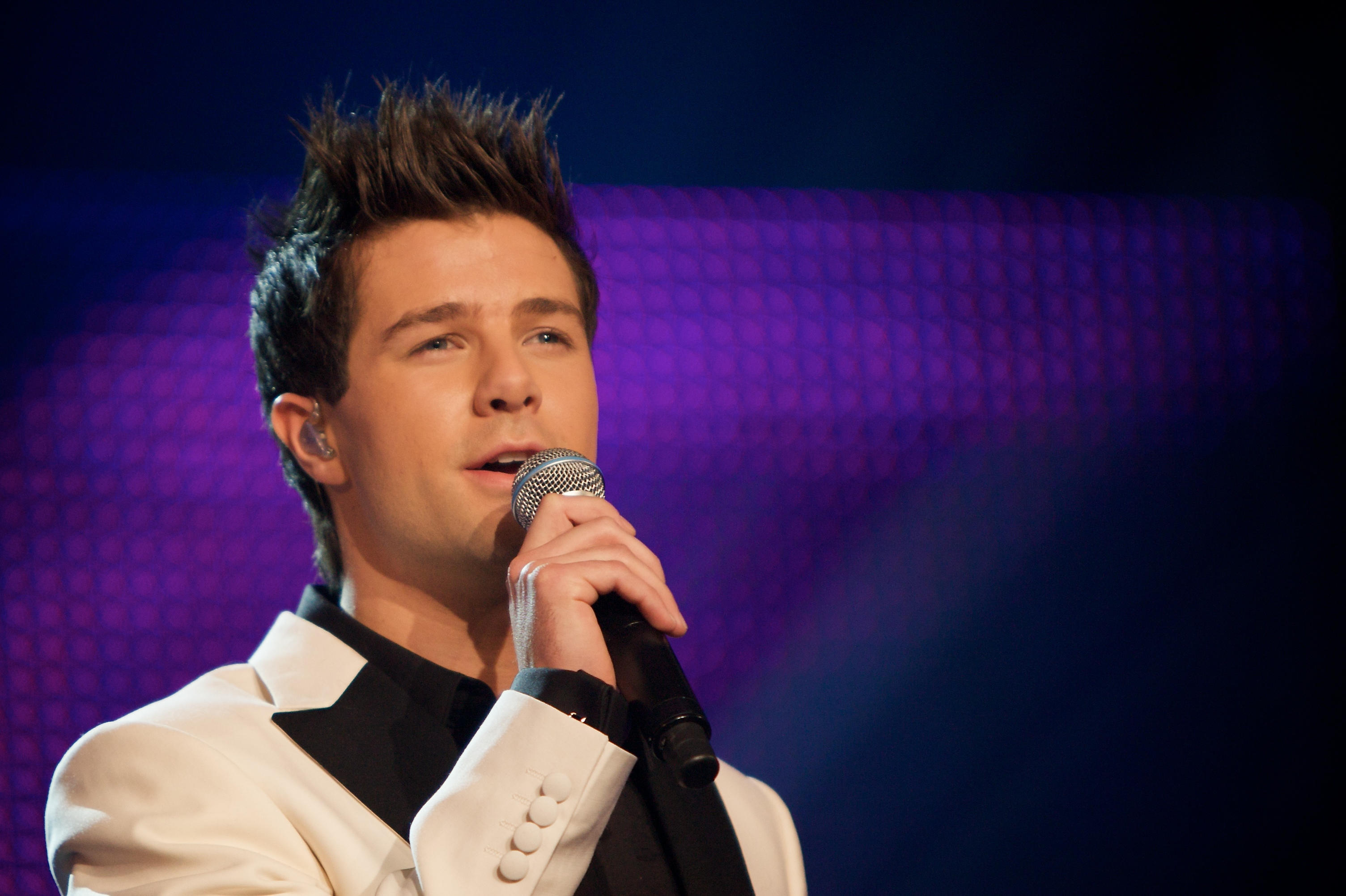
- Solli-Tangen in 2010

Background information
- Born: 11 June 1987 (age 39)
- Origin: Porsgrunn, Telemark, Norway
- Genres: Operatic pop, Classical crossover, Pop
- Occupation: Singer
- Instrument: Vocals
- Years active: 2009–present
- Labels: Universal Norway, Class A Records
- Spouse: Angelica Omre (m. 2023)
- Website: didriksollitangen.com

Didrik Solli-Tangen (born 11 June 1987) is a Norwegian singer who represented Norway in the Eurovision Song Contest 2010 with the song "My Heart Is Yours".

== Biography ==
Solli-Tangen was born in Porsgrunn. From his early years he was interested in music, and at 15 years old he joined a band, first as the drummer, and later as lead singer, performing in front of classmates and family, and joined the local “high school musical”. By the time he reached upper-secondary school his father had him receive voice coaching from Anders Vangen. Though at the beginning he refused to try singing in an operatic style, considering it old fashioned, he began slowly to accept the idea.

Didrik graduated from the Barratt Due Institute of performing arts in Oslo in 2010, with the highest grade. He's called "the opera singer" by several Norwegian media, but he claims not to accept that label.

== Eurovision 2010 ==
In 2009, Stockholm-based songwriter Hanne Sørvaag and composer Fredrik Kempe wrote for him My Heart Is Yours, for the 2010 national Eurovision selection. On 6 February Didrik won the national final at Oslo Spektrum, earning the right to represent Norway in Eurovision 2010.

Being the host country representative, he qualified directly to the final, in which he performed in third position. At the end of the voting, he placed 20 out of 25 contestants.

On 3 September 2010, Solli-Tangen's second single "Best Kept Secret" was released under the record label Universal Records. The release of his debut-album, called "Guilty Pleasures", was released on 1 November 2010.

== Melodi Grand Prix 2020 ==
In 2013, Fredrik Boström, Mats Tärnfors, Niclas Lundin and him wrote the song Out of Air. He and his brother Emil Solli-Tangen were chosen by NRK to participate in the Melodi Grand Prix 2020, the Norwegian national selection for Eurovision Song Contest 2020. They were already prequalified for the final, but they performed the song for the first time in the second semifinal, on 18 January, in Fornebu. In the Grand Final, they performed second, after Raylee and before Magnus Bokn. They didn't qualify for the Gold Final, being eliminated by the juries.

== Maskorama ==
Solli-Tangen won the 2021 edition of Maskorama, the Norwegian equivalent of The Masked Singer, disguised as the Snow Monster.

== Other Activities ==
In 2014, he co-hosted Skal vi danse replacing Carsten Skjelbreid, but he had to miss the 6th week due to his emergency surgery for appendicitis. His place was taken on short notice by Guri Solberg.

== Discography ==
=== Albums ===
Year	Album details	Peak chart positions
Year	Album details	NOR
2010	Guilty Pleasures: Released: 1 November 2010; Label: Universal Norway, Class A Records; Formats: CD, download	28
2013	The Journey: Released: 18 November 2013; Label: Universal Norway, Class A Records; Formats: download	—
2020	Det skal bli Jul: Released: 18 November 2013; Label: Pytt Records; Formats: Streaming, Spotify, iTunes, Tidal	—
2024	O Helga Natt: Released: December 2024; Formats: Digital	—

=== Singles ===
Year	Title	Peak chart positions	Album
Year	Title	NOR	Album
2010	"My Heart Is Yours"	2	Guilty Pleasures
2010	"Best Kept Secret"	—	Guilty Pleasures
2011	"Compass"	—	Guilty Pleasures
2012	"We Can Do More"	—	Single only
2013	"Without you"	—	The Journey
2013	"Six Ribbons"	—	The Journey
2013	"Lyset i Betlehem" (with Ole Edvard Antonsen & Sølvguttene)	—	Single only
2020	"Hjem"	—	Hjem

== Personal life ==
He is the brother of fellow artist Emil Solli-Tangen.

Solli-Tangen had been a relationship with Angelica Omre for about ten years before they married in July 2023. The couple currently resides in his hometown of Porsgrunn.

Awards and achievements
Preceded by Alexander Rybak with "Fairytale"	Norway in the Eurovision Song Contest; 2010	Succeeded by Stella Mwangi with "Haba Haba"
