= The X Factor (British TV series) series 10 =

British TV competition

The X Factor
- Series 10
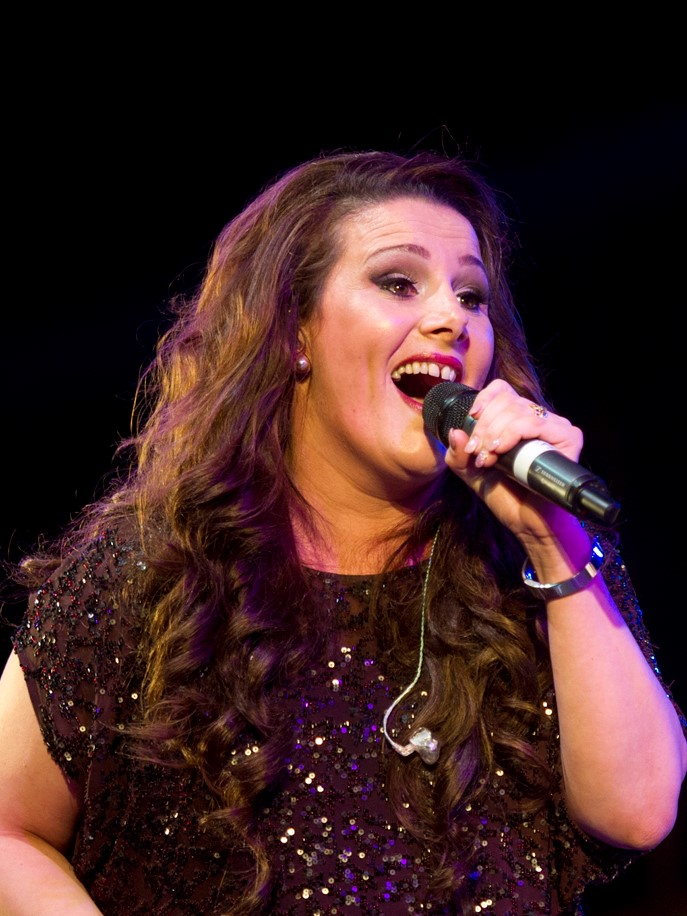
- Sam Bailey performing in Gibraltar in 2015.
- Hosted by: Dermot O'Leary (ITV); Matt Richardson (ITV2); Caroline Flack (ITV2)
- Judges: Nicole Scherzinger; Gary Barlow; Sharon Osbourne; Louis Walsh
- Winner: Sam Bailey
- Winning mentor: Sharon Osbourne
- Runner-up: Nicholas McDonald
- Finals venue: Wembley Arena

Release
- Original network: ITV; ITV2 (The Xtra Factor)
- Original release: 31 August – 15 December 2013

Series chronology
- ← Previous; Series 9 Next → Series 11

The X Factor is a British television music competition to find new singing talent. The tenth series began airing on ITV on 31 August, and finished on 15 December 2013. Dermot O'Leary returned to present the main show on ITV and Caroline Flack was back to present spin-off show The Xtra Factor on ITV2, along with comedian Matt Richardson, who replaced Olly Murs. Flack also presented backstage segments during the live shows. Louis Walsh, Gary Barlow and Nicole Scherzinger returned as judges for their respective tenth, third and second series, with Sharon Osbourne returning to replace Tulisa after five series away. This was Barlow's final series as a judge. Osbourne and Scherzinger also departed the series, but reprised their roles as judges with Walsh again in series 13 and series 14.

Auditions for the series started in March 2013 with mobile auditions taking place in 23 towns and cities. After this, open auditions in front of producers took place in April and May in London, Birmingham, Cardiff, Manchester and Glasgow. Auditions in front of the judges occurred in June and July in the same five cities, with two types of audition: auditionees who were successful in a first audition in an audition room, used for the first time since series 5, went on to attend an audition in an arena, which replaced the rooms in series 6. After bootcamp and judges' houses, the live shows began on 12 October 2013, and ran until the final on 15 December 2013, which was won by over 25s contestant Sam Bailey. This marked the first time someone from the over 25s category had won the show since Steve Brookstein won series 1 in 2004. It also marked the first time that Osbourne had been the winning mentor. As the winner, Bailey received a £1 million recording contract with Syco Music, and also supported Beyoncé at one of her shows during the UK leg of her The Mrs. Carter Show World Tour in 2014.

This was the final series of the three-year deal signed by Simon Cowell in 2010, before it was announced by ITV on 15 November that the show's contract was extended by a further three years, keeping it on air until 2016.

== Judges, Presenters and Other Personnel ==
Judges and Presenter(s) for The X Factor Series 10

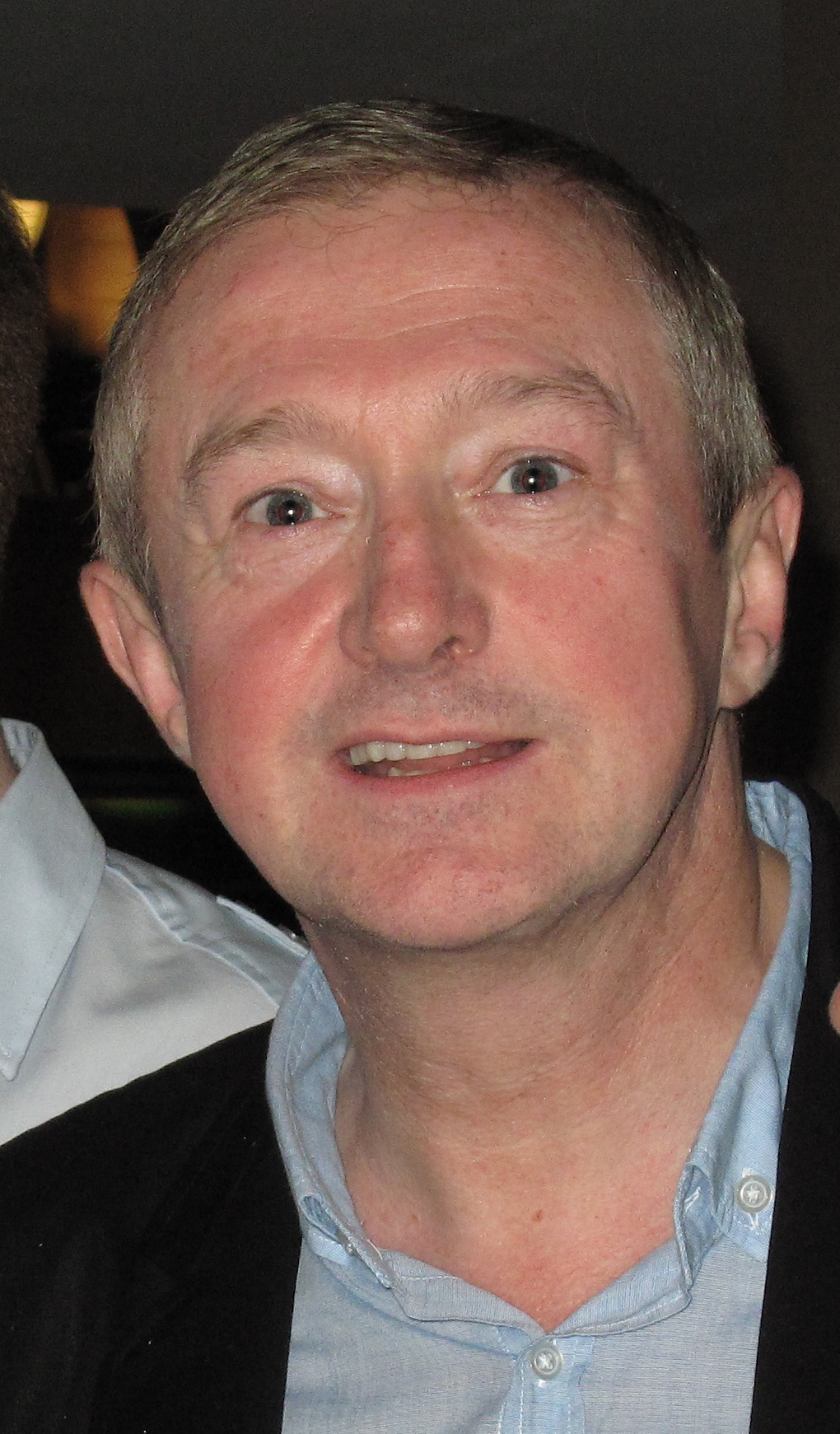
Louis Walsh

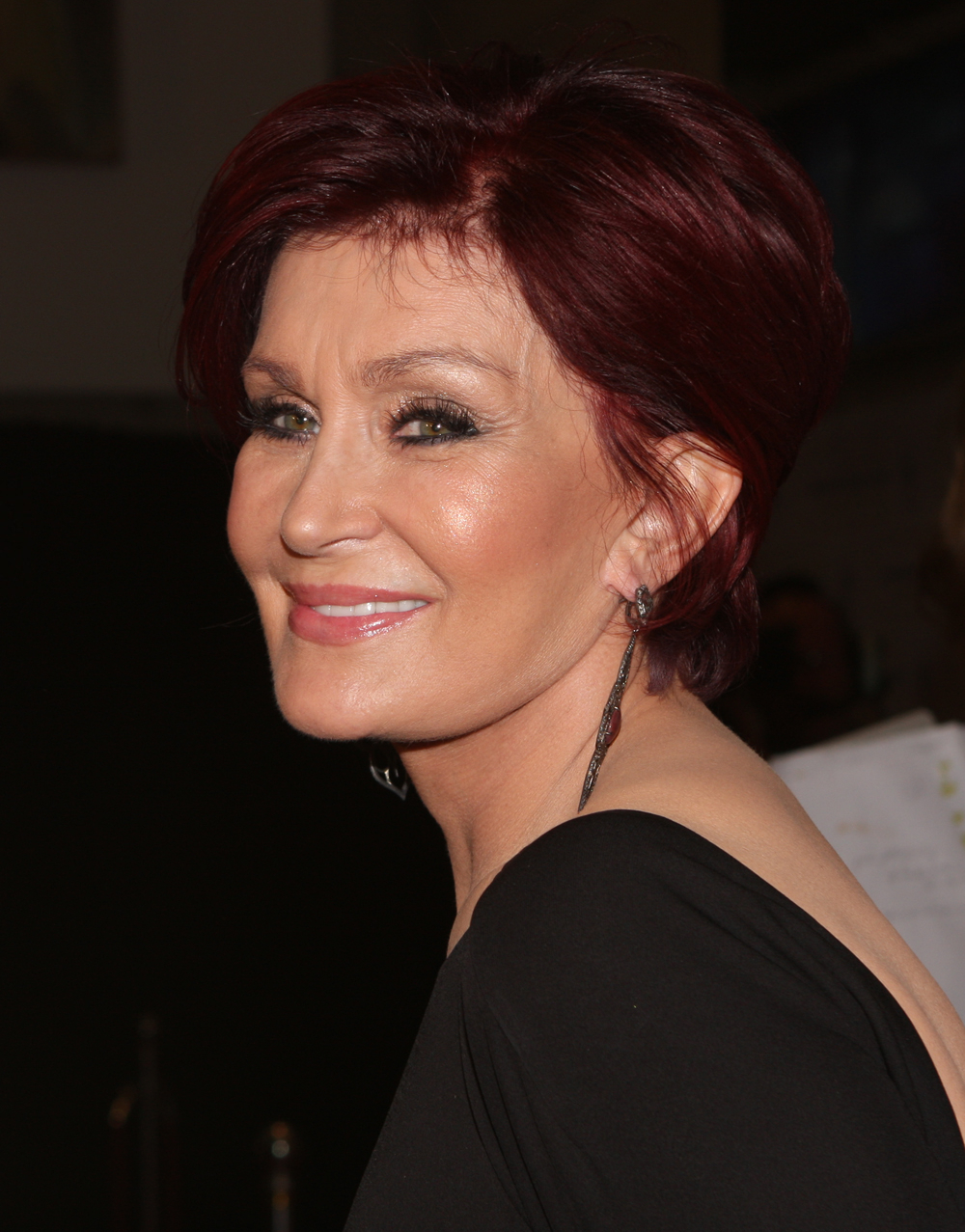
Sharon Osbourne

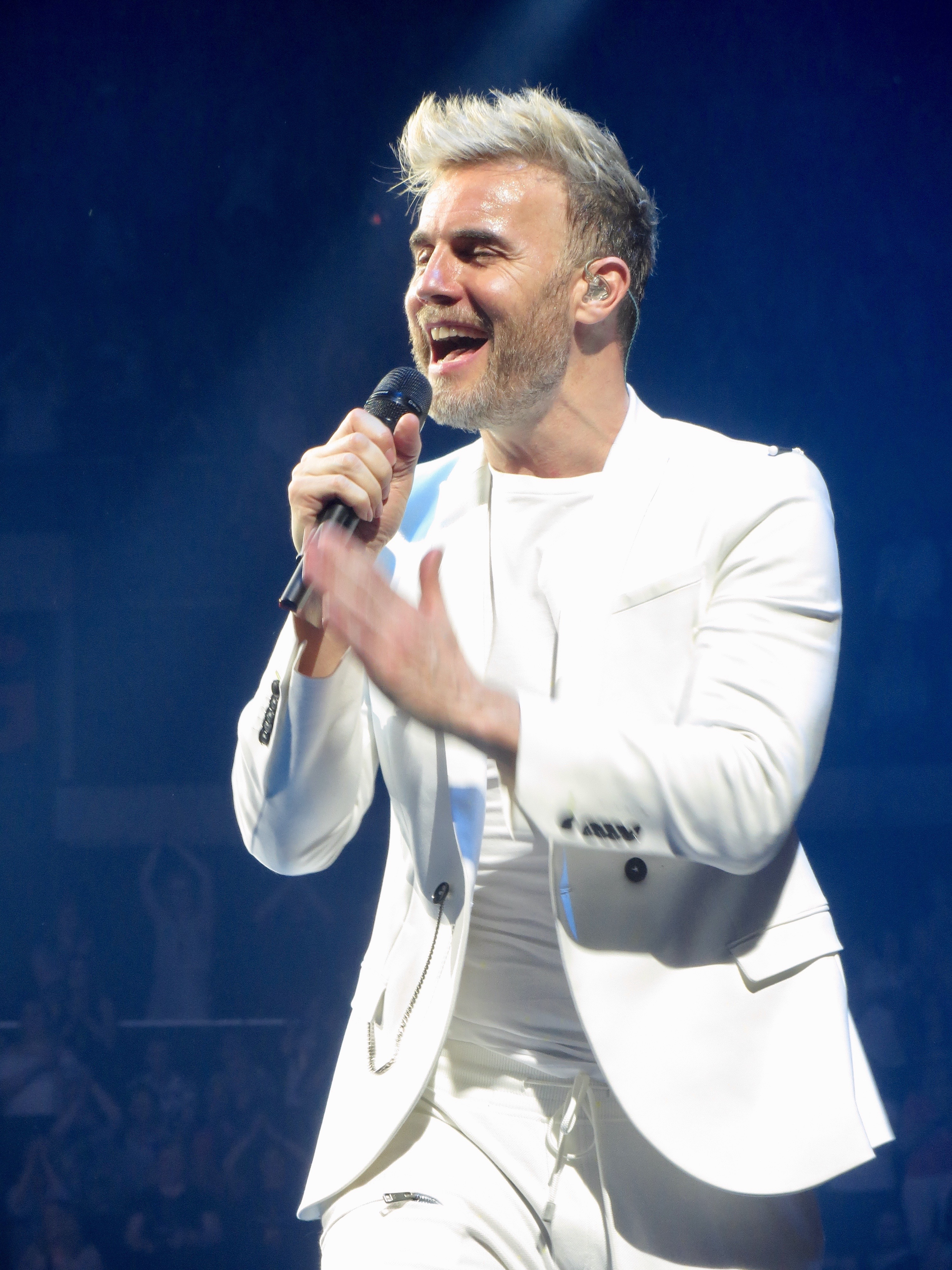
Gary Barlow

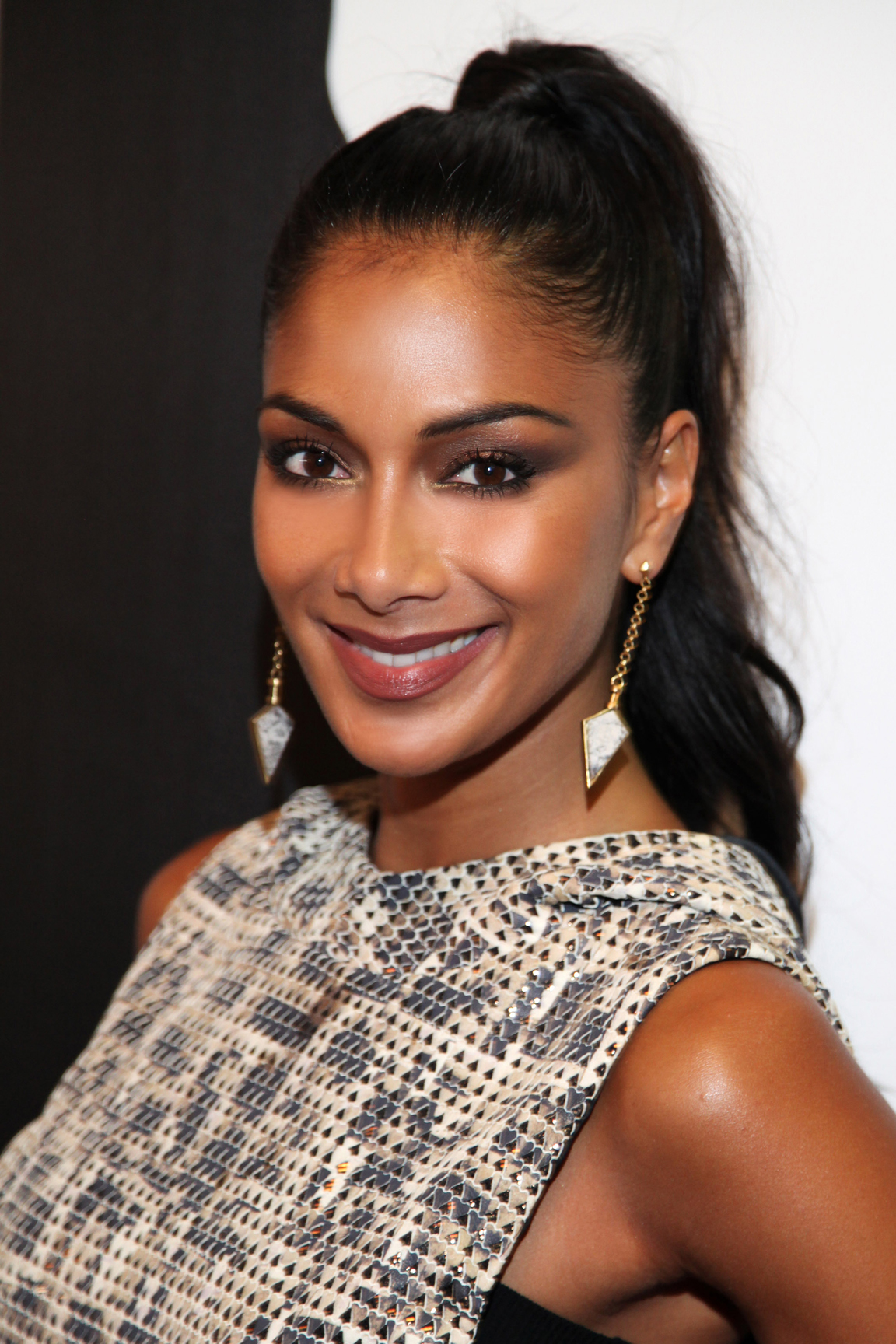
Nicole Scherzinger

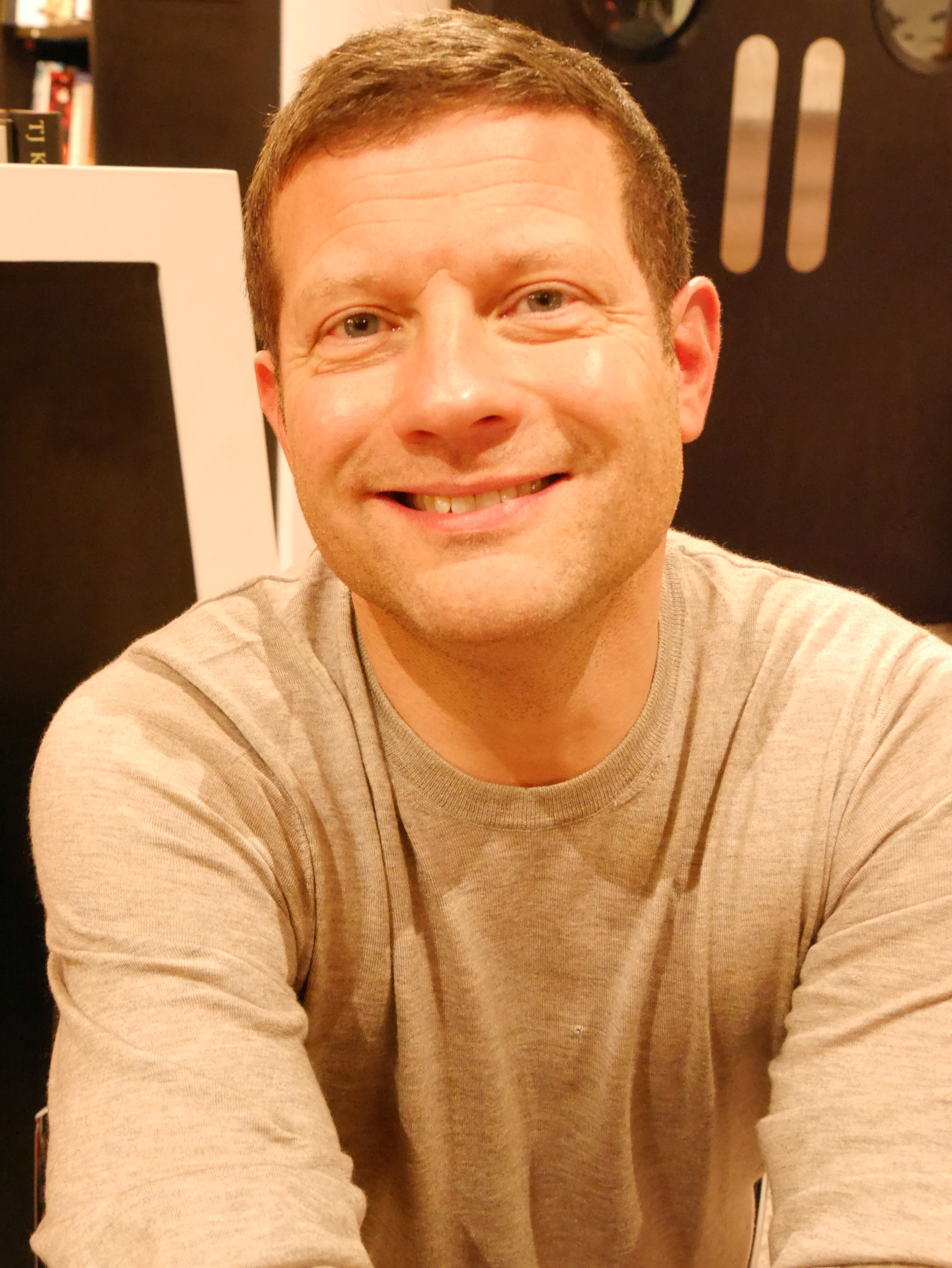
Dermot O'Leary (ITV1)

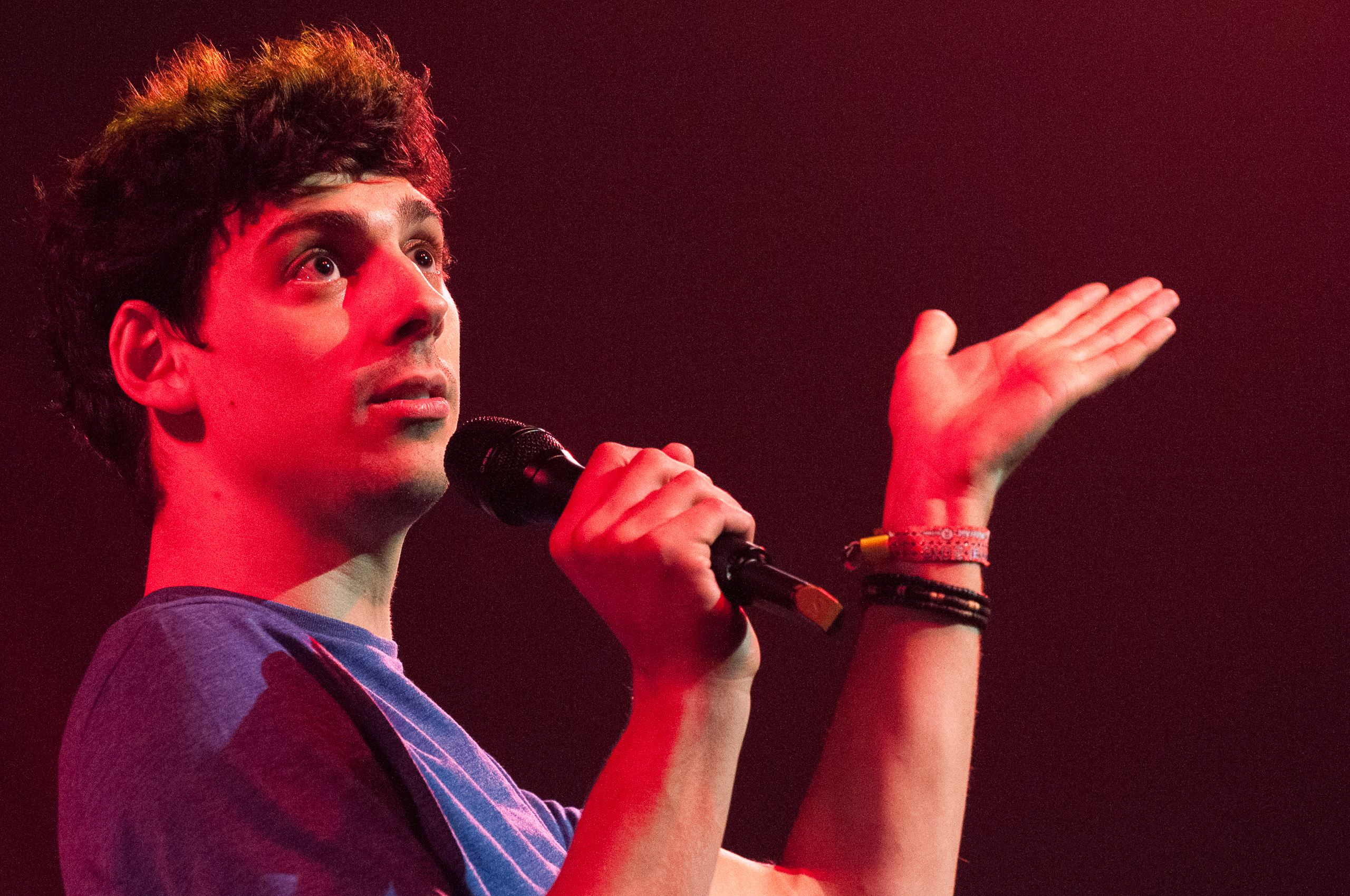
Matt Richardson (ITV2)

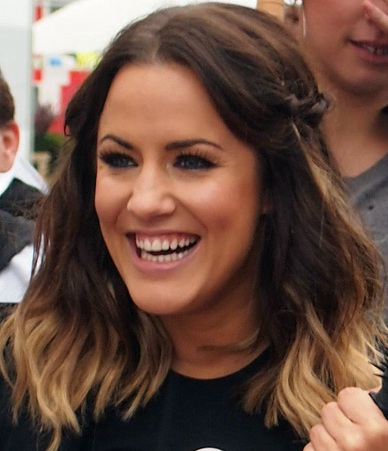
Caroline Flack (ITV2)

It was reported on 22 February 2013 that Tulisa would not return for series 10, after being a judge for two series. She initially denied this and said she wanted to return, However, Tulisa confirmed on 21 May after months of speculation that she would be departing the show. The following day, it was confirmed that original judge Sharon Osbourne, who had been on the panel from series 1 to series 4 would join the remaining three judges from series 9, Louis Walsh, Gary Barlow and Nicole Scherzinger, ending rumours that Scherzinger may leave to focus on her second studio album and be replaced by series 9 guest judge Mel B, which happened in series 11.

Osbourne stated in July that she was back for just one series, "to go out on a high", and during the first live show, Barlow revealed that this would be his last series on the show. Walsh, who had appeared on the show since its inception, announced he would be leaving the show after this series, although he later said he "might come back" if Simon Cowell returned, and later still he said he would most likely continue, claiming "I'm having so much fun this year, I might stay". Walsh eventually confirmed his return for series 11, following the returns of both Cowell and Cheryl Cole.

Dermot O'Leary returned to present the main show on ITV for his seventh series, whilst Caroline Flack came back to present spin-off show The Xtra Factor on ITV2. Olly Murs, Flack's co-presenter for series 8 and 9, wanted to focus on his music career and therefore did not come back. On 29 May, it was announced that comedian Matt Richardson would co-present The Xtra Factor with Flack, after reports that Nick Grimshaw, Dave Berry or Rylan Clark may replace Murs. Flack also presented backstage on the main X Factor programme, during the live shows on Saturdays. Yvie Burnett returned as vocal coach. Brian Burke left as creative director and was replaced by Jerry Reeve and Mark "Swany" Hart.

== Selection process ==
=== Auditions ===
==== Mobile auditions ====
Between 25 March and 1 April 2013, mobile auditions took place in Inverness, Great Yarmouth, Warrington, Aberdeen, Colchester, Hull, Dumfries, Grimsby, Romford, Belfast, Newport on the Isle of Wight, Sunderland, Wakefield, Bangor, Middlesbrough, Yeovil, Aberystwyth, Blackburn, Dublin, Blackpool, Cork, Merthyr Tydfil and Newport in Wales. It was reported that around 20 people attended Colchester auditions on 26 March and producers tried to convince passers-by to audition.

==== Open auditions ====
Cities where auditions were held.

For the first time since series 6, auditions took place in five cities instead of six. Open auditions in front of the show's producers began in London (ExCeL London) on 6 April and continued in Birmingham (International Convention Centre) on 13 April, Cardiff (Millennium Stadium) on 20 April, and Manchester (Old Trafford) on 27 April, before concluding in Glasgow (SECC) on 1 May. Auditions were not held in Liverpool this year, after it was one of the locations in the past two series. Producers said that they were "mixing it up", although reports claim that they were unimpressed with talent in Liverpool, despite four finalists— Ray Quinn (series 3), Rebecca Ferguson (series 7), Marcus Collins (series 8) and Christopher Maloney (series 9)—coming from Liverpool. Additionally, auditions returned to Birmingham after being replaced by Newcastle in series 9. Producers previously held auditions in Newcastle instead of Birmingham because they thought that Birmingham provided "no memorable talent", but reportedly decided to return there after "disappointing" results in Newcastle. Almost 8,000 auditionees attended in London, whilst Cardiff attracted at least 3,000, Birmingham produced around 5,000, over 4,000 auditioned in Manchester and over 2,000 in Glasgow.

==== Judges' auditions ====
This series saw the return of the original auditions format last used in series 5, where auditionees performed in a room in front of the judges. Those who were successful in the room auditions then faced a second audition in an arena—the format used since series 6—to prove they can impress an audience. If they were successful in this audition, they entered the bootcamp stage of the competition. Cowell hoped the "intimate" room auditions would increase ratings. The room auditions in front of the judges began in Glasgow on 4 June at the Hilton Glasgow Grosvenor Hotel and continued in Birmingham on 10 June at the International Convention Centre. Manchester auditions took place over three days from 13 to 15 June at Old Trafford, followed by London auditions which also took place over three days, from 19 to 21 June at ExCeL London. Due to a lack of successful groups, extra auditions specifically for groups took place on 1 July at Price Studios in Battersea, London. Auditions then concluded in Cardiff on 3 July at the Motorpoint Arena. The arena auditions took place at a single venue, Wembley Arena, over four days, from 15 to 18 July. The broadcast of auditions started on 31 August 2013, with room auditions being shown on Saturday nights and arena auditions on Sundays.

The first room audition episode aired on 31 August, and featured auditions from Cardiff, Manchester, London and Birmingham. The second room audition episode featured auditions from Manchester, Cardiff and Glasgow. The third room audition episode showcased auditions from London, Manchester, Birmingham and Glasgow.

Numerous contestants from previous series returned to audition again for this series, including: Amy Mottram, who was Tulisa's wildcard contestant in series 9 and failed to be chosen ahead of Maloney as the 13th contestant; Terry Winstanley, who made it to judges' houses in series 8; Johnny Rocco, whose audition in series 4 ended with him "cursing" Walsh after getting a "no" from all four judges; John Adams, who reached bootcamp in series 8; Curtis Golden, Joseph Whelan and Gathan Cheema, all of whom got to bootcamp in series 9; Stephanie Woods, who got to judges' houses in series 4; Jade Richards, who got to judges' houses in series 8 and bootcamp in series 9; and Melanie McCabe, who got to bootcamp in series 5 and 9 and to judges' houses in series 8. Also auditioning again were groups Rough Copy, who were initially to through to judges' houses in series 9 but had to back out due to visa problems, The Dolly Rockers, who made it to judges' houses in series 3 and James Bellamy and Duane Lamonte from Brick City who both made it to judges' houses in series 2 and series 6 respectively. Another notable group to audition were 1990s pop rock band Next of Kin, who were once labelled "the British Hanson".

Summary of judges' auditions
City	Room auditions		Arena auditions	
City	Date(s)	Venue	Date(s)	Venue
Glasgow	4 June 2013	Hilton Glasgow Grosvenor Hotel	—N/a	
Birmingham	10 June 2013	International Convention Centre	—N/a	
Manchester	13–15 June 2013	Old Trafford	—N/a	
London	19–21 June 2013	ExCeL London	15–18 July 2013	Wembley Arena
London	1 July 2013	Price Studios	15–18 July 2013	Wembley Arena
Cardiff	3 July 2013	Motorpoint Arena	—N/a	

=== Bootcamp/Six Chair Challenge ===
On 17 April 2013, it was reported that this series' bootcamp could be changed and be conducted abroad like judges' houses, however, it was later confirmed that bootcamp would take place at Wembley Arena over four days, across three sessions between 9 and 12 August. It was reported that Cowell was planning to give advice on which acts should progress through this stage, meeting with the judges on his yacht to give opinions on the acts, but further reports claimed that due to a pregnancy scandal, Cowell would instead speak to the judges by telephone, as he did in series 9. However, this did not happen.

In a change to the usual format, the judges were allocated their categories before bootcamp, via a phonecall from executive producer Richard Holloway. Walsh has the Boys, Scherzinger had the Girls, Osbourne has the Over 25s and Barlow has the Groups. For the first stage of bootcamp, soloists were put into groups of three within their category, and groups were put into pairs. They had to perform within that pair or group, and the category judge would then decide who would continue. After the first stage of bootcamp had concluded, Barlow called back two rejected soloists from Scherzinger's Girls category and a female member of a mixed group he had originally turned down, and asked them to form a new three-piece girl group, Miss Dynamix.

The second stage of bootcamp was reworked into a new format called the Six Chair Challenge, that saw the judges choose the acts to advance to judges' houses immediately after their performance, instead of waiting until everyone had performed. Each judge had six places to their judges house, and they granted a 'seat' to the performers they wanted to advance in their category. However, if a judge already chose six acts for their category, they could replace them if they preferred a later performer, therefore causing the Six Chair Challenge to be branded the "ultimate game of musical chairs". Bootcamp was broadcast over two episodes, each of 90 minutes, on 28 and 29 September.

=== Judges' houses ===
Judges' houses took place in September. Each judge took the remaining members of their category to an overseas location, and had guests to assist them in their decisions. Walsh was assisted by Nicole Appleton and Shane Filan along with the returning Sinitta (who's Walsh's assists for the Second Time and Ninth Overall Appearances in the Judges' Houses) when he mentored the Boys in Saint-Tropez, France, in a property worth £10.5 million, next door to a property owned by Nicolas Sarkozy, whose gardeners interrupted filming. Osbourne took the Over 25s to her own home in Beverly Hills, California, assisted by Robbie Williams; Barlow was assisted by series 6 runner-up and former The Xtra Factor co-presenter Olly Murs to mentor the Groups in New York City; and Scherzinger took the Girls to Antigua with Mary J. Blige, staying at the St James Club resort. Groups Code 4 and Rough Copy were forced to lose a member each during judges' houses because of visa problems. At judges' houses, Each act performed two songs for their mentor and his/her guest judge, although only one song was mentioned and shown on the main show, with the other song shown on The Xtra Factor instead (although only the acts who made it to the live shows had their second songs shown). Judges' houses was broadcast over two programmes, on 5 and 6 October.

Judges Houses Performances

Boys:

- Nicholas: "If You're Not The One"
- Sam C: "We Are Young"
- Luke: "Cannonball"
- Giles: "You're Beautiful"
- Paul: "Last Request"
- Ryan: "Just Give Me a Reason"

Groups:

- Kingsland Road: "Dance with Me Tonight"
- Brick City: "All Around the World"
- Rough Copy: "Boyfriend"
- Xyra: "In the Air Tonight"
- Code 4: "Superstition"
- Miss Dynamix: "Pure Shores"

Over 25s:

- Sam B: "I Have Nothing"
- Shelley: "Girl on Fire"
- Lorna: "If I Were a Boy"
- Andrea: "High and Dry"
- Joseph: "I’ll Stand by You"
- Zoe: "Fix You"

Girls:

- Tamera: "Fallin'"
- Jade: "Hurt"
- Abi: "Only You"
- Relley C: "Many Rivers to Cross"
- Melanie: "Run"
- Hannah: "A Change Is Gonna Come"

Summary of judges' houses
Judge	Category	Location	Assistant(s)	Acts Eliminated
Barlow	Groups	New York City	Olly Murs	Brick City, Code 4, Xyra
Osbourne	Over 25s	Beverly Hills	Robbie Williams	Zoe Devlin, Andrea Magee, Joseph Whelan
Scherzinger	Girls	Antigua	Mary J. Blige	Relley C, Melanie McCabe, Jade Richards
Walsh	Boys	Saint-Tropez	Nicole Appleton, Shane Filan and Sinitta	Paul Akister, Ryan Mathie, Giles Potter

== Acts ==
Key:

– Winner
– Runner-Up

Act	Age(s)	Hometown	Category (mentor)	Result
Sam Bailey	36	Leicester	Over 25s (Osbourne)	Winner
Nicholas McDonald	17	North Lanarkshire	Boys (Walsh)	Runner-Up
Luke Friend	17	Teignmouth	Boys (Walsh)	3rd Place
Rough Copy	24–27	Various	Groups (Barlow)	4th Place
Tamera Foster	16	Gravesend	Girls (Scherzinger)	5th Place
Hannah Barrett	17	South Norwood	Girls (Scherzinger)	6th Place
Sam Callahan	19	Essex	Boys (Walsh)	7th Place
Abi Alton	19	Guisborough	Girls (Scherzinger)	8th Place
Kingsland Road	19–25	East London	Groups (Barlow)	9th Place
Miss Dynamix	16–22	Various	Groups (Barlow)	10th Place
Shelley Smith	35	Farringdon	Over 25s (Osbourne)	11th Place
Lorna Simpson	26	South Norwood	Over 25s (Osbourne)	12th Place

== Live shows ==
The live shows started on 12 October. As in previous series, each week's song choices followed a particular theme. Each contestant performed on Saturday, while eliminations and guest performances took place on Sunday. For the first three weeks, a new "flash vote" took place at the end of each Saturday night show, where the voting lines opened for about eight minutes, and the act with the fewest votes faced the "sing-off" (also known as the "final showdown") on Sunday. Voting lines for the remaining contestants then reopened, and stayed open until the Sunday shows, where the second contestant to face the "sing-off" was revealed. "Deadlock", where the act with the fewest public votes is eliminated after the judges' votes are tied, was eliminated while there was a flash vote, and instead, in the event that judges' votes were tied, the contestant that lost the flash vote was eliminated. However, in week 4 the flash vote was rested because of Nile Rodgers and Chic's performance, meaning there was not enough time at the end of the show for the flash vote, and "deadlock" would have returned if the judges' votes had been tied, and the flash vote did not return after this. Deadlock was used in the quarter-final and semi-final due to tie votes from the judges.

The final took place at the normal venue, Wembley Arena on 14 and 15 December 2013.

=== Musical guests ===
Each results show featured musical performances from at least two artists, while occasionally, artists performed on the main performances show. Ellie Goulding and Cher performed on the first results show, Robin Thicke and Katy Perry performed on the second, and The Wanted and Lady Gaga performed on the third. Nile Rodgers and Chic performed a medley of three songs on the fourth live show, in what was billed as a "special edition" of The X Factor. Little Mix performed on the fourth live results show, followed by Taylor Swift with Gary Lightbody. Robbie Williams and Celine Dion appeared on the fifth results show, though Dion's performance was pre-recorded. The sixth live results show featured performances from judge Gary Barlow, who was relaunching his solo career, and Miley Cyrus. Olly Murs performed on the seventh live show, then JLS, Mary J. Blige with Jessie J, and One Direction performed on the seventh live results show. Rebecca Ferguson and James Arthur performed on the eighth results show, Leona Lewis and Michael Bublé performed on the semi-final live results show, Tom Odell and The Killers performed in the first show of the final, and One Direction, Perry, Elton John and Barlow performed in the second show of the final.

=== Results summary ===
Colour key

Act in Boys

Act in Girls

Act in Over 25s

Act in Groups

–	Act did not face the public vote because they were already in the sing-off
–	Act received the fewest public votes or was in the bottom two and had to sing again in the sing-off
–	Act received the fewest public votes and was eliminated immediately
–	Act was given a "Bye Week" and automatically advanced to the following week
–	Act received the most public votes

Weekly results per act
Act	Week 1		Week 2		Week 3		Week 4	Week 5	Week 6	Week 7	Quarter-Final	Semi-Final	Final	
Act	Saturday Vote	Sunday Vote^{1}	Saturday Vote	Sunday Vote^{1}	Saturday Vote	Sunday Vote^{1}	Week 4	Week 5	Week 6	Week 7	Quarter-Final	Semi-Final	Saturday Vote	Sunday Vote^{1}
Sam Bailey	1st 23.4%	2nd 23.3%	2nd 16.8%	2nd 17.4%	1st 27.0%	1st 27.0%	1st 31.1%	1st 28.4%	2nd 26.5%	1st 36.0%	1st 27.4%	1st 29.6%	1st 38.2%	Winner; 53.4%
Nicholas McDonald	2nd 23.3%	1st 23.5%	1st 28.1%	1st 27.1%	2nd 25.3%	2nd 24.8%	2nd 18.2%	2nd 20.2%	1st 31.4%	2nd 23.9%	2nd 25.1%	2nd 28.2%	2nd 32.1%	Runner-Up; 36.3%
Luke Friend	9th 3.4%	9th 3.5%	7th 5.9%	8th 6.0%	3rd 7.9%	3rd 7.5%	6th 7.0%	5th 9.0%	6th 8.0%	3rd 13.0%	4th 19.3%	3rd 26.7%	3rd 29.7%	Eliminated (final)
Rough Copy	3rd 18.4%	3rd 16.4%	5th 8.6%	4th 10.2%	8th 6.2%	6th 6.7%	5th 7.5%	3rd 11.1%	4th 8.7%	6th 8.7%	3rd 19.7%	4th 15.5%	Eliminated (semi-final)	
Tamera Foster	6th 4.9%	7th 5.1%	4th 9.4%	5th 9.2%	4th 7.7%	4th 7.3%	9th 4.7%	4th 10.0%	5th 8.4%	4th 9.3%	5th 8.5%	Eliminated (quarter-final)		
Hannah Barrett	5th 5.3%	5th 5.2%	3rd 12.7%	3rd 10.4%	7th 6.2%	9th 5.9%	3rd 12.0%	7th 7.1%	3rd 9.9%	5th 9.1%	Eliminated (week 7)			
Sam Callahan	8th 3.5%	6th 5.1%	8th 5.1%	7th 6.6%	9th 4.8%	8th 6.0%	4th 7.6%	6th 8.0%	7th 7.1%	Eliminated (week 6)				
Abi Alton	4th 9.2%	4th 9.0%	6th 6.1%	6th 6.9%	5th 6.6%	5th 7.1%	7th 6.7%	8th 6.2%	Eliminated (week 5)					
Kingsland Road	7th 3.7%	8th 4.1%	10th 3.6%	—N/a	6th 6.5%	7th 6.6%	8th 5.2%	Eliminated (week 4)						
Miss Dynamix	10th 1.8%	10th 2.2%	Bye Week^{2}		10th 1.8%	—N/a	Eliminated (week 3)							
Shelley Smith	12th 1.5%	—N/a	9th 3.7%	9th 4.3%	Eliminated (week 2)									
Lorna Simpson	11th 1.6%	11th 1.7%	Eliminated (week 1)											
Sing-off	Simpson, Smith		Kingsland Road, Smith		Barrett, Miss Dynamix		Foster, Kingsland Road	Alton, Barrett	Cahallan, Friend	Barrett, Rough Copy	Foster, Friend	Friend, Rough Copy	No sing-off or judges' votes: results based on public votes alone	
Judges voted to	Eliminate											Send Through	No sing-off or judges' votes: results based on public votes alone	
Walsh's vote (Boys)	Simpson		Smith		—N/a^{3}		Kingsland Road	—N/a^{4}	None (abstained)	Barrett	Foster	Friend	No sing-off or judges' votes: results based on public votes alone	
Osbourne's vote (Over 25s)	None (abstained)		Kingsland Road		Miss Dynamix		Kingsland Road	Alton	—N/a^{5}	Barrett	Foster	Friend	No sing-off or judges' votes: results based on public votes alone	
Barlow's vote (Groups)	Smith		Smith		Barrett		Foster	Alton	Callahan	Barrett	Friend	Rough Copy	No sing-off or judges' votes: results based on public votes alone	
Scherzinger's vote (Girls)	Simpson		Smith		Miss Dynamix		Kingsland Road	None (abstained)	Callahan	Rough Copy	Friend	Rough Copy	No sing-off or judges' votes: results based on public votes alone	
Eliminated	Lorna Simpson; 2 of 3 votes Majority		Shelley Smith; 3 of 4 votes Majority		Miss Dynamix; 2 of 3 votes Flash Vote		Kingsland Road; 3 of 4 votes Majority	Abi Alton; 2 of 2 votes Majority	Sam Callahan; 2 of 2 votes Majority	Hannah Barrett; 3 of 4 votes Majority	Tamera Foster; 2 of 4 votes Deadlock	Rough Copy; 2 of 4 votes Deadlock	Luke Friend; 29.7% to save	Nicholas McDonald; 36.3% to win
Reference(s)														

- ^1Owing to the freezing of votes, the voting percentages in Weeks 1, 2 and 3, as well as the Final for all the Sunday Votes do not add up to 100%. Shelley Smith received 0.5% of the Sunday Vote in Week 1, Kingsland Road received 1.1% of the Sunday Vote in Week 2, Miss Dynamix received 0.5% of the Sunday Vote in Week 3 and Luke Friend received 10.3% of the Sunday Vote in the Final.
- ^2 Miss Dynamix were given a bye in Week 2 as band member SeSe Foster was too ill to perform. Miss Dynamix automatically advanced to Week 3.
- ^3 Walsh did not need to vote as Scherzinger and Osbourne had already voted to eliminate Miss Dynamix; having lost the flash vote, they would have been eliminated regardless of Walsh's decision. Walsh said he would have voted to eliminate Miss Dynamix.
- ^4 Walsh did not need to vote as there was already a majority. He said he would have voted to eliminate Abi Alton.
- ^5 Osbourne did not need to vote as there was already a majority. She said she would have voted to eliminate Sam Callahan.

=== Live show details ===
==== Week 1 (12/13 October) ====
- Theme: Songs from the 1980s
- Group performance: "Get Lucky"
- Musical guests: Ellie Goulding ("Burn") and Cher ("I Hope You Find It")

Acts' performances on the first live show
Act	Category (mentor)	Order	Song	Year	Result
Hannah Barrett	Girls (Scherzinger)	1	"What's Love Got to Do with It"	1984	Safe
Nicholas McDonald	Boys (Walsh)	2	"True"	1983	Safe (Highest Votes - Sunday Public Vote)
Miss Dynamix	Groups (Barlow)	3	"Jump (for My Love)"	1984	Safe
Sam Bailey	Over 25s (Osbourne)	4	"The Power of Love"	1984	Safe (Highest Votes - Saturday Flash Vote)
Sam Callahan	Boys (Walsh)	5	"Summer of '69"	1985	Safe
Kingsland Road	Groups (Barlow)	6	"I'm Your Man"	1985	Safe
Shelley Smith	Over 25s (Osbourne)	7	"Alone"	1987	Lost Saturday Flash Vote
Abi Alton	Girls (Scherzinger)	8	"Livin' on a Prayer"	1986	Safe
Lorna Simpson	Over 25s (Osbourne)	9	"So Emotional"	1987	Lost Sunday Public Vote
Tamera Foster	Girls (Scherzinger)	10	"Ain't Nobody"	1983	Safe
Luke Friend	Boys (Walsh)	11	"Every Breath You Take"	1983	Safe
Rough Copy	Groups (Barlow)	12	"In the Air Tonight"	1981	Safe
Sing-off details
Shelley Smith	Over 25s (Osbourne)	1	"One Night Only"		Saved
Lorna Simpson	Over 25s (Osbourne)	2	"There You'll Be"		Eliminated

Judges' votes to eliminate

- Osbourne abstained from voting as both acts were in her category.
- Walsh: Lorna Simpson – gave no reason.
- Barlow: Shelley Smith – said that Smith was only in the bottom two through a poor song choice, but felt that Simpson would go further in the competition.
- Scherzinger: Lorna Simpson – thought that there was "more to see from" Smith.

However, if the result was tied, Simpson would have been saved.

==== Week 2 (19/20 October) ====
- Theme: Love and heartbreak
- Group performance: "Wake Me Up"
- Musical guests: Robin Thicke ("Blurred Lines") and Katy Perry ("Roar")

Acts' performances on the second live show
Act	Category (mentor)	Order	Song	Result
Sam Bailey	Over 25s (Osbourne)	1	"Make You Feel My Love"	Safe
Kingsland Road	Groups (Barlow)	2	"Marry You"	Lost Saturday Flash Vote
Nicholas McDonald	Boys (Walsh)	3	"She's the One"	Safe (Highest Votes - Saturday And Sunday Votes)
Abi Alton	Girls (Scherzinger)	4	"Can't Get You Out of My Head"	Safe
Shelley Smith	Over 25s (Osbourne)	5	"Single Ladies (Put a Ring on It)"	Lost Sunday Public Vote
Miss Dynamix	Groups (Barlow)	6	Bye Week^{2}	Automatically Advanced
Sam Callahan	Boys (Walsh)	7	"I Won't Give Up"	Safe
Tamera Foster	Girls (Scherzinger)	8	"Beneath Your Beautiful"	Safe
Luke Friend	Boys (Walsh)	9	"Let Her Go"	Safe
Rough Copy	Groups (Barlow)	10	"I Want It That Way"	Safe
Hannah Barrett	Girls (Scherzinger)	11	"Beautiful"	Safe
Sing-off details
Kingsland Road	Groups (Barlow)	1	"Try"	Saved
Shelley Smith	Over 25s (Osbourne)	2	"Stop!"	Eliminated

^1 Due to band member SeSe Foster being in the hospital, Miss Dynamix did not perform and were given a bye week which automatically advanced them to the following week. They would have gone on 6th and performed "Dreams", but actually performed the song the following week and keep the same number.

Judges' votes to eliminate

- Barlow: Shelley Smith – gave no reason but effectively backed his own act, Kingsland Road.
- Osbourne: Kingsland Road – backed her own act, Shelley Smith.
- Scherzinger: Shelley Smith – based on the fact that she saved Smith the previous week.
- Walsh: Shelley Smith – felt Kingsland Road had more potential.

However, if Walsh tied the result, Kingsland Road would have been eliminated.

==== Week 3 (26/27 October) ====
- Theme: Songs from films ("Movie week")
- Group performance: "Locked Out of Heaven"
- Musical guests: The Wanted ("Show Me Love (America)") and Lady Gaga ("Venus"/"Do What U Want")

Acts' performances on the third live show
Act	Category (mentor)	Order	Song	Film	Result
Rough Copy	Groups (Barlow)	1	"(Everything I Do) I Do It for You"	Robin Hood: Prince of Thieves	Safe
Sam Callahan	Boys (Walsh)	2	"All I Want Is You"	Reality Bites	Safe
Hannah Barrett	Girls (Scherzinger)	3	"Skyfall"	Skyfall	Lost Sunday Public Vote
Nicholas McDonald	Boys (Walsh)	4	"Angel"	City of Angels	Safe
Abi Alton	Girls (Scherzinger)	5	"Moon River"	Breakfast at Tiffany's	Safe
Miss Dynamix	Groups (Barlow)	6	"Dreams"	Magnolia	Lost Saturday Flash Vote
Sam Bailey	Over 25s (Osbourne)	7	"My Heart Will Go On"	Titanic	Safe (Highest Votes - Saturday And Sunday Votes)
Kingsland Road	Groups (Barlow)	8	"Oh, Pretty Woman"	Pretty Woman	Safe
Luke Friend	Boys (Walsh)	9	"Kiss from a Rose"	Batman Forever	Safe
Tamera Foster	Girls (Scherzinger)	10	"Listen"	Dreamgirls	Safe
Sing-off details
Hannah Barrett	Girls (Scherzinger)	1	"Read All About It, Pt. III"		Saved
Miss Dynamix	Groups (Barlow)	2	"Don't You Worry Child"		Eliminated

Judges' votes to eliminate

- Scherzinger: Miss Dynamix – backed her own act, Hannah Barrett.
- Barlow: Hannah Barrett – backed his own act, Miss Dynamix, but was surprised Barrett was in the sing off due to her performance from the previous night being one of his favourites.
- Osbourne: Miss Dynamix – gave no reason.
- Walsh was not required to vote, but stated he would have voted to eliminate Miss Dynamix.

==== Week 4 (2/3 November) ====
- Theme: Disco
- Group performance: "A Night to Remember"
- Musical guests:
  - Saturday: Nile Rodgers and Chic ("Le Freak"/"He's the Greatest Dancer"/"Good Times")
  - Sunday: Little Mix ("Move") and Taylor Swift featuring Gary Lightbody ("The Last Time")

The flash vote was cancelled this week because of lack of time, due to Rodgers and Chic's performance, and the two acts receiving the fewest votes were announced during Sunday's results show.

Acts' performances on the fourth live show
Act	Category (mentor)	Order	Song	Result
Luke Friend	Boys (Walsh)	1	"Play That Funky Music"	Safe
Kingsland Road	Groups (Barlow)	2	"Blame It on the Boogie"	Bottom Two
Tamera Foster	Girls (Scherzinger)	3	"Wishing on a Star"	Bottom Two
Sam Callahan	Boys (Walsh)	4	"Relight My Fire"	Safe
Rough Copy	Groups (Barlow)	5	"September"	Safe
Abi Alton	Girls (Scherzinger)	6	"I Will Survive"	Safe
Nicholas McDonald	Boys (Walsh)	7	"Rock with You"	Safe
Hannah Barrett	Girls (Scherzinger)	8	"Somebody Else's Guy"	Safe
Sam Bailey	Over 25s (Osbourne)	9	"No More Tears (Enough Is Enough)"	Safe (Highest Votes)
Sing-off details
Kingsland Road	Groups (Barlow)	1	"I Won't Let You Go"	Eliminated
Tamera Foster	Girls (Scherzinger)	2	"I Have Nothing"	Saved

Judges' votes to eliminate

- Scherzinger: Kingsland Road – backed her own act, Tamera Foster.
- Barlow: Tamera Foster – backed his own act, Kingsland Road.
- Osbourne: Kingsland Road – gave no comment; she later said on The Xtra Factor that she could not think of a reason to send them home nor to justify keeping them in the competition despite her own fondness for them.
- Walsh: Kingsland Road – said that Foster "sang her heart out" in her sing-off performance and had "star quality".

However, voting statistics revealed that Kingsland Road received more votes than Foster which meant that if Walsh sent the result to deadlock, Kingsland Road would have been saved.

==== Week 5 (9/10 November) ====
- Theme: Big band
- Group performance: "Love Me Again"
- Musical guests: Celine Dion ("Loved Me Back to Life") and Robbie Williams ("Go Gentle")

The acts performed with a 36-piece live band, instead of a backing track. The flash vote did not return this week, and a show source said there were no plans for it to return. Cowell made an appearance during rehearsals via VT this week and told the final 8 they would be taking part in the 2014 live tour.

Acts' performances on the fifth live show
Act	Category (mentor)	Order	Song	Big Band Artist	Result
Abi Alton	Girls (Scherzinger)	1	"That's Life"	Frank Sinatra	Bottom Two
Sam Bailey	Over 25s (Osbourne)	2	"Theme from New York, New York"	Liza Minnelli	Safe (Highest Votes)
Nicholas McDonald	Boys (Walsh)	3	"Dream a Little Dream of Me"	The Mamas and the Papas	Safe
Luke Friend	Boys (Walsh)	4	"Moondance"	Van Morrison	Safe
Hannah Barrett	Girls (Scherzinger)	5	"It's a Man's Man's Man's World"	James Brown	Bottom Two
Rough Copy	Groups (Barlow)	6	"Hit the Road Jack"	Ray Charles	Safe
Tamera Foster	Girls (Scherzinger)	7	"Cry Me a River"	Michael Bublé	Safe
Sam Callahan	Boys (Walsh)	8	"Ain't That a Kick in the Head?"	Dean Martin	Safe
Sing-off details
Abi Alton	Girls (Scherzinger)	1	"Lego House"		Eliminated
Hannah Barrett	Girls (Scherzinger)	2	"Wrecking Ball"		Saved

Judges' votes to eliminate

- Scherzinger abstained from voting as both acts were in her category.
- Barlow: Abi Alton – based on the sing-off performances.
- Osbourne: Abi Alton – admonished Alton for waiting until the sing-off to deliver passion and emotion in her performance, and expressed worry about her development as an artist in the competition.
- Walsh was not required to vote but stated he would have voted to eliminate Alton.

==== Week 6 (16/17 November) ====
- Theme: "The Great British Songbook"
- Group performance: "Never Forget"
- Musical guests: Miley Cyrus ("Wrecking Ball") and Gary Barlow ("Let Me Go")

A minimum of 15p from every contestant vote cast, plus a minimum of 50p from every track downloaded from this weekend's live performances, will be donated to the Disasters Emergency Committee's relief efforts following Typhoon Haiyan.

Acts' performances on the sixth live show
Act	Category (mentor)	Order	Song	British Artist	Result
Hannah Barrett	Girls (Scherzinger)	1	"(I Can't Get No) Satisfaction"	The Rolling Stones	Safe
Luke Friend	Boys (Walsh)	2	"Your Song"	Elton John	Bottom Two
Sam Bailey	Over 25s (Osbourne)	3	"Something"	The Beatles	Safe
Rough Copy	Groups (Barlow)	4	"Viva la Vida"	Coldplay	Safe
Sam Callahan	Boys (Walsh)	5	"Faith"	George Michael	Bottom Two
Tamera Foster	Girls (Scherzinger)	6	"Diamonds Are Forever"	Shirley Bassey	Safe
Nicholas McDonald	Boys (Walsh)	7	"Someone like You"	Adele	Safe (Highest Votes)
Sing-off details
Luke Friend	Boys (Walsh)	1	"I Still Haven't Found What I'm Looking For"		Saved
Sam Callahan	Boys (Walsh)	2	"Iris"		Eliminated

Judges' votes to eliminate

- Walsh abstained from voting as both acts were in his category.
- Scherzinger: Sam Callahan – said Friend was the better singer, and also admonished Callahan for waiting until the sing-off to put his "heart and soul" into his performance.
- Barlow: Sam Callahan – gave no specific reason, but praised Callahan for his work ethic.
- Osbourne was not required to vote, but stated she would have voted to eliminate Callahan.

==== Week 7 (23/24 November) ====
- Theme: "The Best of The X Factor" (songs recorded or performed by previous finalists)
- Guest mentors: Joe McElderry, Alexandra Burke, Shayne Ward, Little Mix, Olly Murs and Leona Lewis
- Group performance: "Everybody in Love" (with JLS)
- Musical guests:
  - Saturday: Olly Murs ("Hand on Heart")
  - Sunday: JLS ("Everybody in Love", with finalists), Mary J. Blige featuring Jessie J ("Do You Hear What I Hear?") and One Direction ("Story of My Life")

Acts' performances on the sixth live show
Act	Category (mentor)	Order	Song	Previous Finalist	Result
Nicholas McDonald	Boys (Walsh)	1	"The Climb"	Joe McElderry	Safe
Hannah Barrett	Girls (Scherzinger)	2	"Hallelujah"	Alexandra Burke	Bottom Two
Luke Friend	Boys (Walsh)	3	"What Makes You Beautiful"	One Direction	Safe
Rough Copy	Groups (Barlow)	4	"Don't Let Go (Love)"	Little Mix	Bottom Two
Tamera Foster	Girls (Scherzinger)	5	"Impossible"	James Arthur	Safe
Sam Bailey	Over 25s (Osbourne)	6	"Bleeding Love"	Leona Lewis	Safe (Highest Votes)
Sing-off details
Hannah Barrett	Girls (Scherzinger)	1	"I'd Rather Go Blind"		Eliminated
Rough Copy	Groups (Barlow)	2	"Stop Crying Your Heart Out"		Saved

Judges' votes to eliminate

- Scherzinger: Rough Copy – backed her own act, Hannah Barrett.
- Barlow: Hannah Barrett – gave no reason, but effectively backed his own act, Rough Copy.
- Osbourne: Hannah Barrett – because it was Barrett's third time in the bottom two.
- Walsh: Hannah Barrett – gave no reason, but on The Xtra Factor he said that it was because Barrett had been in the sing-off three times and Rough Copy had more to give.

However, voting statistics revealed that Barrett received more votes than Rough Copy which meant that if Walsh sent the result to deadlock, Barrett would have advanced to the quarter-final and Rough Copy would have been eliminated.

==== Week 8: Quarter-Final (30 November/1 December) ====
- Theme: Contestant's musical heroes; viewers' choice (billed as "Jukebox week")
- Group performance: "Burn"
- Musical guests: Rebecca Ferguson ("I Hope") and James Arthur ("Recovery")

For the first time this series, the acts performed two songs each. One song was chosen by a public vote via the official The X Factor app. On 24 November, the song choices for the public were revealed.

List of song choices for the jukebox week theme
Act	Category (mentor)	Song Choices	Result	Percentage
Luke Friend	Boys (Walsh)	"Bridge over Troubled Water"	Not Chosen	33.0%
Luke Friend	Boys (Walsh)	"Skinny Love"	Chosen	42.0%
Luke Friend	Boys (Walsh)	"One Day Like This"	Not Chosen	25.0%
Nicholas McDonald	Boys (Walsh)	"The Prayer"	Not Chosen	11.0%
Nicholas McDonald	Boys (Walsh)	"Amazed"	Not Chosen	20.2%
Nicholas McDonald	Boys (Walsh)	"Just the Way You Are"	Chosen	68.8%
Rough Copy	Groups (Barlow)	"End of the Road"	Not Chosen	38.4%
Rough Copy	Groups (Barlow)	"I Believe I Can Fly"	Chosen	46.5%
Rough Copy	Groups (Barlow)	"If You Ever"	Not Chosen	15.1%
Sam Bailey	Over 25s (Osbourne)	"The Living Years"	Not Chosen	10.3%
Sam Bailey	Over 25s (Osbourne)	"Clown"	Chosen	54.4%
Sam Bailey	Over 25s (Osbourne)	"Without You"	Not Chosen	35.3%
Tamera Foster	Girls (Scherzinger)	"The First Time Ever I Saw Your Face"	Chosen	46.0%
Tamera Foster	Girls (Scherzinger)	"This Woman's Work"	Not Chosen	20.9%
Tamera Foster	Girls (Scherzinger)	"Emotion"	Not Chosen	33.1%

Acts' performances in the quarter-final
Act	Category (mentor)	Order	First song	Theme	Order	Second song	Theme	Result
Nicholas McDonald	Boys (Walsh)	1	"Just the Way You Are"	Viewers' Choice	6	"Greatest Day"	Musical Hero	Safe
Sam Bailey	Over 25s (Osbourne)	2	"How Will I Know"	Musical Hero	7	"Clown"	Viewers' Choice	Safe (Highest Votes)
Tamera Foster	Girls (Scherzinger)	3	"We Found Love"	Musical Hero	9	"The First Time Ever I Saw Your Face"	Viewers' choice	Bottom Two
Luke Friend	Boys (Walsh)	4	"Skinny Love"	Viewers' Choice	8	"I Will Wait"	Musical Hero	Bottom Two
Rough Copy	Groups (Barlow)	5	"Every Little Step"/"She's Got That Vibe"	Musical Hero	10	"I Believe I Can Fly"	Viewers' Choice	Safe
Sing-off details
Tamera Foster	Girls (Scherzinger)	1	"The Voice Within"					Eliminated
Luke Friend	Boys (Walsh)	2	"Run"					Saved

Judges' votes to eliminate

- Scherzinger: Luke Friend – backed her own act, Tamera Foster, but said that Friend had a gift that no one could take away from him.
- Walsh: Tamera Foster – backed his own act, Luke Friend, who he said was better in the sing-off.
- Osbourne: Tamera Foster – said that Friend delivered "an organic natural performance" in the sing-off.
- Barlow: Luke Friend – could not decide and sent the result to deadlock; he further explained his statement by saying that Friend had one of his "best nights" but thought Foster had "come back strong" in the quarter-final and that she was going to be "one of the biggest stars after the series".

With the acts in the bottom two receiving two votes each, the result went to deadlock and reverted to the earlier public vote. Foster was eliminated as the act with the fewest public votes.

==== Week 9: Semi-Final (7/8 December) ====
- Themes: Songs by Beyoncé; songs by Elton John (billed as "Elton John vs. Beyoncé")
- Group performance: "Signed, Sealed, Delivered I'm Yours"
- Musical guests: Leona Lewis ("One More Sleep") and Michael Bublé ("You Make Me Feel So Young")

Acts' performances in the semi-final
Act	Category (mentor)	Order	Beyoncé song	Order	Elton John song	Result
Luke Friend	Boys (Walsh)	1	"Best Thing I Never Had"	6	"Something About the Way You Look Tonight"	Bottom Two
Nicholas McDonald	Boys (Walsh)	2	"Halo"	5	"Don't Let the Sun Go Down on Me"	Safe
Sam Bailey	Over 25s (Osbourne)	3	"If I Were a Boy"	8	"Candle in the Wind"	Safe (Highest Votes)
Rough Copy	Groups (Barlow)	4	"Survivor"	7	"Sorry Seems to Be the Hardest Word"	Bottom Two
Sing-off details
Luke Friend	Boys (Walsh)	1	"Somewhere Only We Know"			Saved
Rough Copy	Groups (Barlow)	2	"End of the Road"			Eliminated

Judges' votes to send through to the final

- Barlow: Rough Copy – gave no reason but essentially backed his own act, Rough Copy.
- Walsh: Luke Friend – gave no reason but essentially backed his own act, Luke Friend.
- Scherzinger: Rough Copy – gave no reason.
- Osbourne: Luke Friend – could not decide and sent the result to deadlock.

With the acts in the bottom two receiving two votes each, the result went to deadlock and reverted to the earlier public vote. Friend advanced to the final as the act with the most public votes.

==== Week 10: Final (14/15 December) ====
14 December

- Themes: No theme (new song); celebrity duets
- Group performance: "Lifted"
- Musical guests: Tom Odell ("Another Love"); Kitty Brucknell, 2 Shoes, John & Edward, Wagner, Johnny Robinson, Diva Fever and Rylan Clark ("Live and Let Die" / "Under Pressure (Ice Ice Baby)" / "Love Shack" / "Spice Up Your Life"); The Killers ("Human", "Mr. Brightside")

Acts' performances on the Saturday Final
Act	Category (mentor)	Order	New Song	Order	Duet Song	Partner	Result
Nicholas McDonald	Boys (Walsh)	1	"Candy"	5	"Flying Without Wings"	Shane Filan	Safe
Sam Bailey	Over 25s (Osbourne)	2	"The Edge of Glory"	6	"And I Am Telling You I'm Not Going"	Nicole Scherzinger	Safe (Highest Votes)
Luke Friend	Boys (Walsh)	3	"We Are Young"	4	"Anything Could Happen"	Ellie Goulding	Eliminated

Luke Friend received the fewest public votes and was automatically eliminated.

15 December

- Themes: Favourite performance ("song of the series"); winner's single
- Group performance: "Roar" (all contestants except Lorna Simpson)
- Musical guests: One Direction ("Midnight Memories"), Katy Perry ("Unconditionally") and Gary Barlow featuring Elton John ("Face to Face")

Acts' performances on the Sunday Final
Act	Category (mentor)	Order	Favourite song	Order	Winner's song	Result
Nicholas McDonald	Boys (Walsh)	1	"Angel"	3	"Superman (It's Not Easy)"	Runner-Up
Sam Bailey	Over 25s (Osbourne)	2	"The Power of Love"	4	"Skyscraper"	Winner

== Prize ==
As the winner, Sam Bailey received a £1 million recording contract with Syco Music, she went on to join Beyoncé Knowles for one night in Birmingham, on the UK leg of her The Mrs. Carter Show World Tour in 2014. Bailey's winner's single "Skyscraper" was released on 16 December, the day after she won, and sold over 100,000 copies to become the Christmas number one on 22 December. This made Bailey the first X Factor winner since Matt Cardle in 2010 to gain the Christmas number one (series 8 winners Little Mix and series 9 winner James Arthur both released their winners' singles two weeks before the Christmas chart, thus avoiding the Christmas number-one battle, although they both charted in the top three of the Christmas chart regardless). On 24 November, it was revealed that the winner's single, like Arthur's, would be a charity release to raise money for Together for Short Lives, and also the Great Ormond Street Hospital. If Nicholas McDonald had won, he would have released "Superman (It's Not Easy)" as his winner's single.

== Reception ==
=== Ratings ===
The series launch on 31 August 2013 received average overnight ratings of 8.78 million, a 40% share of the viewing audience at that time, and peaked at 9.08 million. The average rating was 680,000 more viewers than the series 9 launch, but still 2.5 million fewer than the series 8 launch. The first Sunday show the following night attracted average overnight ratings of 9.21 million, a 36.2% audience share. This was officially the highest rated episode of the series. The following Saturday, on 7 September, the ratings dropped to 840,000 fewer than the launch, an overnight rating of 7.94 million. The second Sunday show saw viewers fall by 300,000 viewers compared to the previous Sunday, but it was up by more than 1 million on the fourth auditions episode of series 9. The ratings for the third Saturday show were up on the second by 710,000, with an average overnight rating of 8.65 million. The next day, the average overnight ratings reached 9.08 million and peaked at 10.7 million. The final weekend of auditions saw viewers decrease by around 200,000 on the Saturday, though the next day saw the show reach a new peak audience of 9.42 million, according to overnight figures.

Summary of episode ratings
Episode	Air date	Duration (minutes)^{1}	Share (%)	Official ITV rating (millions)	Official ITV HD rating (millions)	Official ITV+1 rating (millions)	Total viewers (millions)	Weekly rank^{3}
Auditions 1	31 August	80	40.0	8.69	1.30	0.48	10.47	2
Auditions 2	1 September	60	36.2	9.21	1.20	0.78	11.19	1
Auditions 3	7 September	60	36.3	7.94	1.30	0.39	9.63	2
Auditions 4	8 September	60	35.5	8.89	1.38	0.58	10.85	1
Auditions 5	14 September	60	40.0	8.34	1.44	0.43	10.21	3
Auditions 6	15 September	60	34.7	8.86	1.34	0.61	10.81	1
Auditions 7	21 September	60	38.2	8.30	1.37	0.38	10.05	3
Auditions 8	22 September	60	37.3	9.15	1.47	0.49	11.11	2
Bootcamp 1	28 September	90	34.6	7.75	1.21	—N/a^{2}	8.96	9
Bootcamp 2	29 September	90	37.3	9.12	1.38	0.31	10.81	2
Judges' houses 1	5 October	110	34.8	8.14	1.46	0.32	9.92	3
Judges' houses 2	6 October	110	32.8	7.85	1.28	0.40	9.53	6
Live show 1	12 October	135	33.3	7.72	1.30	0.31	9.33	5
Live results 1	13 October	60	35.8	8.79	1.28	—N/a^{2}	10.07	3
Live show 2	19 October	125	32.9	7.50	1.10	0.39	8.99	10
Live results 2	20 October	60	32.9	8.12	1.25	0.33	9.70	7
Live show 3	26 October	120	33.7	7.40	1.21	0.31	8.92	12
Live results 3	27 October	60	33.5	8.29	1.18	—N/a^{2}	9.47	7
Live show 4	2 November	110	33.2	7.53	1.15	—N/a^{2}	8.68	10
Live results 4	3 November	60	31.7	7.90	1.10	0.36	9.36	9
Live show 5	9 November	95	34.5	8.14	1.18	—N/a^{2}	9.32	10
Live results 5	10 November	60	34.1	8.38	1.26	—N/a^{2}	9.64	8
Live show 6	16 November	90	34.9	7.74	1.39	0.33	9.46	8
Live results 6	17 November	60	33.0	8.59	1.19	—N/a^{2}	9.78	5
Live show 7	23 November	90	27.2	7.26	1.24	0.37	8.87	16
Live results 7	24 November	60	33.3	8.34	1.21	—N/a^{2}	9.55	11
Live show 8	30 November	90	32.2	7.29	1.20	—N/a^{2}	8.49	17
Live results 8	1 December	60	29.4	6.86	1.37	0.33	8.56	16
Live show 9	7 December	90	35.5	7.84	1.23	—N/a^{2}	9.07	13
Live results 9	8 December	60	34.3	8.34	1.23	—N/a^{2}	9.57	12
Live final	14 December	125	34.9	7.79	1.32	0.32	9.43	7
Live final results	15 December	120	36.3	8.92	1.28	—N/a^{2}	10.20	3
Series average		—N/a	34.5	8.16	1.28	0.41^{4}	9.69	—N/a

^{1} Includes advert breaks
^{2} The ITV+1 figure for this episode is unavailable as it was outside the top 10 programmes of the week on BARB.
^{3} The rank for the ITV broadcast, compared with all channels for that week, from Monday to Sunday.
^{4} The average figure for ITV+1 includes only the episodes with figures available.

=== Controversy and criticism ===
==== Trailer ====
The mash-up video trailer promoting the tenth series was published as a "mash up of all the best a decade of X Factor has to offer" on 25 July 2013. The trailer consists of various music videos from 13 past contestants: winners Shayne Ward, Leona Lewis, Alexandra Burke, Joe McElderry, Little Mix and James Arthur, and finalists One Direction, JLS, Olly Murs, Union J, Amelia Lily, Cher Lloyd and Misha B. However, fans questioned the exclusion of winners Steve Brookstein, Leon Jackson and Matt Cardle, and successful contestants Diana Vickers, Jedward, and Rebecca Ferguson. Cardle's manager Will Talbot said that he believed the show was "attempting to erase Matt from the history books. [...] In truth, it pretty much sums up Syco's attitude to him during the months after he inconveniently (for them) won the show. Unfortunately there is a misconception that Matt has slagged off the show and fallen out with Sony but this is not true." Cardle later described being omitted from the advert as "disappointing", especially for fans who would have liked to have seen him in it. Melanie C, who has collaborated with Cardle, was more critical, saying: "I think it's really f****** rude the way they have left him out."

==== Format changes ====
The change to the format of the auditions was criticised by Alex Fletcher from entertainment news website Digital Spy, who said he could not see the logic in having auditions broadcast on both Saturdays and Sundays, as complaints from series 9 were not about needing extra auditions, but about "dour judges" and "underwhelming finalists". He praised the return of the audition room but felt that "the producers and [Simon] Cowell evidently weren't confident in the format change and have kept the arena auditions as an extra second round," stating that the Bootcamp stage of the competition could have been used to show "how the acts cope under pressure with a live audience," adding that "the Sunday show feels like a bit of a formality" and "generally the singers who stun us on Saturday will impress again on Sunday." He said that "the extra Sunday helping of The X Factor will still rate much higher than anything else that was going to air in that slot for ITV. So for the bean counters and X Factor PR machine it will probably be labelled a hit. In the long-term, however, I fear this 'Supersized X Factor' may lead some viewers to reach for their remotes suffering from reality TV fatigue."

Additionally, Fletcher was critical of the format change to bootcamp, saying "The show can be cruel for those taking part, brutal for those who don't make the grade, and its fickleness is nothing compared to the harsh realities of the music industry. However, the argument that 'the music industry is meaner' fell apart this week. [...] I refuse to believe that anyone in the music industry has even been given a contract, told they're brilliant and then forced to watch 15 other people sing and have that contract ripped up in front of their faces. And even if they have, I bet they didn't have an audience of 4,000 people chanting at them to be on their way. This was reality TV at its most cruel." He wondered if the change was a "desperate attempt to create interest in a series that has performed solidly in the ratings, but without creating any real talking points or memorable moments", and said that "watching Karen Harding, Lydia Lucy and Sheena McHugh get put into the Top 6 and then have the dream of a spot at Judges' Houses snatched away from them felt needlessly mean. Whether the trio deserved to make Judges' Houses or not felt irrelevant. The audience finger-pointing and the chanting of 'Swap! Swap! Swap!' made the whole process terribly ugly." He questioned the show's producers' "need to make it even more vicious", opined that the new twist "definitely undermines the credibility of the show's judges", and said, "The whole twist felt contrived and unpleasant, and I hope it won't be returning in 2014."

Fans and viewers of the show also criticised the bootcamp format, with some viewers said to be fearing for the contestants' wellbeing, with one calling it "blood sport". Singer Lily Allen, who watched the show, said, "When did become alright to f*** with people's minds. X Factor has got fully mean." Contestant Lydia Lucy, who was initially chosen to be in Scherzinger's final six but was replaced by Abi Alton, said, "It still hasn't sunk in. I've been absolutely devastated. [...] If Simon Cowell was in front of me now I'd tell him to change the format back to how it was. This way is like dangling a carrot in front of someone and then taking it away."

The new "flash vote" twist during the live shows was met negatively by Lorna Simpson, who was the first contestant to be eliminated. Simpson said it was unfair that she had far less time to prepare than fellow sing-off contestant Shelley Smith, claiming "They set me up to go out in the first week". It was reported that Cowell was planning to axe the flash vote after The X Factor was heavily beaten by Strictly Come Dancing in the ratings for the second live show. The flash vote was not used in week 4 due to a performance at the start of the show by Nile Rodgers and Chic, and was not used again in week 5. A source from the show said, "at the moment it is not scheduled to return". The flash vote was not used again after week 3.

==== Contestants ====
Before judges' houses, urban act Code 4 had to drop one of their members, Mark Wyman, after it emerged that he had a criminal record, and a spokesman for The X Factor said, "Unfortunately due to problems in getting a visa Mark was unable to travel to Judges' Houses in America, meaning that he ended up having to leave the band to carry on in the competition as a three piece." Code 4 did not make it to the live shows. Three-piece band Rough Copy also had to lose member Kazeem "Kaz" Ajobe before the six-chair challenge due to visa problems. The same had happened to the group in series 9, but this year the other two members, Sterling Ramsay and Joey James, continued without Ajobe and advanced to judges' houses as a duo. Fans questioned the events, and the extent to which ITV wanted to resolve them, saying they had a year to get a visa, and Barlow could have stayed in the United Kingdom, the latter sentiment to which Barlow admitted to Ajobe he should have done during the judges' houses episodes. Barlow put Rough Copy through to the live shows and Ajobe was allowed to rejoin the band. Furthermore, just after Ajobe was reinstated, controversy was caused when his criminal past was publicised. Ajobe responded by stating: "I've done things I am not proud of. I haven't been an angel but I am a changed man now."

There was criticism over SeSe Foster of Miss Dynamix being allowed to compete in the show, because she was five months pregnant when the live shows began. Some viewers also thought it was unfair that Miss Dynamix got an automatic bye to the next week when Foster collapsed before the second live show. Foster dismissed this, saying that she "deserve[s] a shot at a better life" and insisted her collapse was not related to her pregnancy. The following week, Miss Dynamix were eliminated after losing the flash-vote and the sing-off to Hannah Barrett. Following this, Barlow stated that he felt that all public hopes of the group continuing in the competition had ended with their absence in week 2, despite him previously hoping that Foster's collapse would have gained more sympathy for them from the public. On 28 October, Cowell posted a tweet on his Twitter account expressing his disapproval of the week 3 result, stating that he would have voted to save Miss Dynamix if he was a judge on the series at the time.

==== Judges' comments ====
Some viewers were shocked by a comment made by Osbourne following 16-year-old Nicholas McDonald's performance of "She's the One" during the second live show. As McDonald got to the end of the song, a female backing dancer walked towards him and he kissed her cheek after the song finished. Despite the minimum age of sexual consent in the United Kingdom and the Crown Dependencies standing at 16, Osbourne then said to McDonald, who was 16 and therefore legal, "Who on earth was that piece of whatever next to you? That paedophile. You're only 16. You can't be doing that. That's a disgrace ITV." She was later spoken to by producers, but Walsh defended her, saying "She meant nothing wrong by it. We all say things we shouldn't and X Factor is not scripted." The dancer declined to comment, but a source close to her said that she was embarrassed by Osbourne's comment.

==== Guest performances ====
Ofcom received around 200 complaints about Lady Gaga's performance, including her costume and lyrics, during the third results show on 27 October 2013. ITV received 60 complaints directly. Lady Gaga wore nude-coloured underwear and her lyrics included "do what you want with my body". A spokeswoman for ITV said, "We do not believe Lady Gaga's performance was inappropriate for the family audience of The X Factor results show, which has an established tradition of featuring performances from the biggest music stars. Lady Gaga is well known for her highly individual performance style." Ofcom said, "We will assess all the complaints received on this issue before deciding whether to investigate."

Robin Thicke's performance, which featured a large number of scantily-clad female dancers, also received a total of 317 complaints. On 16 December, both Gaga and Thicke were cleared of any wrongdoing, with an Ofcom spokesman stating, "We assessed the complaints and concluded there were no grounds to investigate."

==== Final ====
There were technical problems during Sam Bailey's duet performance with Scherzinger, when Jedward's voices could be heard as they completed a microphone test. The duet was panned by viewers who accused Scherzinger of being "selfish" by singing the "best" lines and notes of the song.
