= Norway in the Eurovision Song Contest 2020 =

- Eurovision Song Contest 2020
- Participating broadcaster: Norsk rikskringkasting (NRK)
- Country: Norway
- Selection process: Melodi Grand Prix 2020
- Selection date: 15 February 2020

Competing entry
- Song: "Attention"
- Artist: Ulrikke
- Songwriters: Christian Ingebrigtsen; Kjetil Mørland; Ulrikke Brandstorp

Placement
- Final result: Contest cancelled

Participation chronology

Norway was set to be represented at the Eurovision Song Contest 2020. The Norwegian broadcaster Norsk rikskringkasting (NRK) organised the national final Melodi Grand Prix 2020 in order to select the Norwegian entry for the 2020 contest in Rotterdam, the Netherlands. The competition was won by Ulrikke with the song "Attention". However, the contest was cancelled due to the COVID-19 pandemic in Europe.

== Background ==
Prior to the 2020 Contest, Norway had participated in the Eurovision Song Contest fifty-nine times since their first entry in 1960. Norway had won the contest on three occasions: in 1985 with the song "La det swinge" performed by Bobbysocks!, in 1995 with the song "Nocturne" performed by Secret Garden and in 2009 with the song "Fairytale" performed by Alexander Rybak. Norway also had the two dubious distinctions of having finished last in the Eurovision final more than any other country and for having the most "nul points" (zero points) in the contest, the latter being a record the nation shared together with Austria. The country had finished last eleven times and had failed to score a point during four contests. Following the introduction of semi-finals in 2004, Norway has only failed to qualify on three occasions. In 2019, Norway was represented by Keiino with the song "Spirit in the Sky", which placed 6th in the final with 331 points.

The Norwegian national broadcaster, Norsk rikskringkasting (NRK), broadcasts the event within Norway and organises the selection process for the nation's entry. The broadcaster has traditionally organised the national final Melodi Grand Prix, which has selected the Norwegian entry for the Eurovision Song Contest in all but one of their participations.

== Before Eurovision ==
=== Melodi Grand Prix 2020 ===
Melodi Grand Prix 2020 was the 58th edition of the Norwegian national final Melodi Grand Prix and selected Norway's entry for the Eurovision Song Contest 2020. To celebrate the 60th anniversary of Norway in the Eurovision Song Contest, the competition consisted of five semi-finals based on Norway's five regions between 11 January 2020 and 8 February 2020 and a final on 15 February 2020. All shows were hosted by Kåre Magnus Bergh, Ingrid Gjessing Linhave and Ronny Brede Aase, televised on NRK1, NRK TV, broadcast via radio on NRK P1 as well as streamed online at NRK's official website nrk.no.

==== Semi-finals ====
- The first semi-final (Southern Norway) took place on 11 January 2020. "Wild" performed by Raylee qualified to the final.
- The second semi-final (Eastern Norway) took place on 18 January 2020. "One Last Time" performed by Rein Alexander qualified to the final.
- The third semi-final (Central Norway) took place on 25 January 2020. "Pray for Me" performed by Kristin Husøy qualified to the final.
- The fourth semi-final (Western Norway) took place on 1 February 2020. "Over the Sea" performed by Magnus Bokn qualified to the final.
- The fifth semi-final (Northern Norway) took place on 8 February 2020. "I Am Gay" performed by Liza Vassilieva qualified to the final.

==== Final ====
Ten songs consisting of the five semi-final qualifiers alongside the five pre-qualified songs competed during the final on 15 February 2020 at the Trondheim Spektrum in Trondheim. This was the third time a Melodi Grand Prix final had been held outside of Oslo and the first time since 1989. It was also the first time that Trondheim hosted the final. The winner was to be selected over three rounds of online voting, however due to technical difficulties with the online vote in the first round, the top four entries were selected by a 30-member demoscopic jury panel to proceed to the second round, the Gold Final. In the Gold Final, the top two entries were selected solely by the online vote to proceed to the third round, the Gold Duel. In the Gold Duel, the results of the online vote were revealed by Norway's five regions and led to the victory of "Attention" performed by Ulrikke Brandstorp with 200,345 votes.

Final – 15 February 2020
R/O	Artist	Song	Result
1	Raylee	"Wild"	Gold Final
2	Didrik and Emil Solli-Tangen	"Out of Air"	—N/a
3	Magnus Bokn	"Over the Sea"	—N/a
4	Akuvi	"Som du er"	—N/a
5	Kristin Husøy	"Pray for Me"	Gold Final
6	Rein Alexander	"One Last Time"	—N/a
7	Tone Damli	"Hurts Sometimes"	—N/a
8	Sondrey	"Take My Time"	—N/a
9	Ulrikke Brandstorp	"Attention"	Gold Final
10	Liza Vassilieva	"I Am Gay"	Gold Final

Gold Final
R/O	Artist	Song	Result
1	Kristin Husøy	"Pray for Me"	Gold Duel
2	Ulrikke Brandstorp	"Attention"	Gold Duel
3	Liza Vassilieva	"I Am Gay"	—N/a
4	Raylee	"Wild"	—N/a

Gold Duel
R/O	Artist	Song	Votes	Place
1	Kristin Husøy	"Pray for Me"	194,667	2
2	Ulrikke Brandstorp	"Attention"	200,345	1

== At Eurovision ==
According to Eurovision rules, all nations with the exceptions of the host country and the "Big Five" (France, Germany, Italy, Spain and the United Kingdom) are required to qualify from one of two semi-finals in order to compete for the final; the top ten countries from each semi-final progress to the final. The European Broadcasting Union (EBU) split up the competing countries into six different pots based on voting patterns from previous contests, with countries with favourable voting histories put into the same pot. On 28 January 2020, a special allocation draw was held which placed each country into one of the two semi-finals, as well as which half of the show they would perform in. Norway was placed into the first semi-final, to be held on 12 May 2020, and was scheduled to perform in the second half of the show. However, due to 2019-20 pandemic of Coronavirus, the contest was cancelled.
