= In Love and I Hate It =

Single by A1

from the album Waiting for Daylight
- Released: 4 August 2010
- Recorded: 2009–2010
- Length: 3:36
- Label: Universal
- Songwriters: Ben Adams, Mark Read, Christian Ingebrigtsen, Martin Sjølie, Micheal Hunter Ochs
- Producer: Micheal Hunter Ochs

A1 singles chronology
| "Don't Wanna Lose You Again" (2010) | "In Love and I Hate It" (2010) | "Waiting for Daylight" (2011) |

"In Love and I Hate It" is a song by British-Norwegian boyband A1, released as the third single from their fourth studio album, Waiting for Daylight.

== Background ==
After taking a period of time out to record following the release of their Eurovision-penned release Don't Wanna Lose You Again, the band recorded a number of songs for their upcoming fourth studio album, Waiting for Daylight. On a post made on the group's official Facebook page, they claimed the intention of originally releasing "Waiting for Daylight", the album's title track, as the third single, however, at the last minute, opting to release "In Love and I Hate It" instead. The band also claimed the song was recorded with an acoustic arrangement, however, the final version features a more computerised musical beat. After the song surfaced on many filesharing websites, the band made the decision to officially release the song via digital download. The song was made available on the iTunes Store from 4 August 2010. On 10 August 2010, the single peaked at No. 13 on the Norwegian Singles Chart. The band ran a competition through their official website in which 100 lucky recipients would win a physical copy of the single, hand-signed by each member of the group. The physical single was never commercially released. The single features the original acoustic demo of the song, as mentioned in the post, as a B-side.

== Music video ==
The music video for "In Love and I Hate It" features footage from a performance of the song at a Norwegian music festival in June 2010. The video also features English-language subtitles, but notably, misses the first line of the song due to a technical error. The video premiered on Norwegian music channels in July 2011, and was uploaded to YouTube by an amateur user on 7 August 2010. The video has a total length of three minutes and thirty-two seconds. The video has been broadcast by UK TV channel The Vault.

== Track listing ==
- Digital download
1. "In Love and I Hate It" - 3:36
2. "Don't Wanna Lose You Again" (Original acoustic demo) - 3:47
3. "Good Things, Bad People" (Original acoustic demo) - 3:05
4. "Caught in the Middle" (Unmastered Production demo) - 3:19
- CD single
1. "In Love and I Hate It" - 3:36
2. "In Love and I Hate It" (Original acoustic demo) - 3:48

== Chart positions ==
| Chart (2010) | Peak position |
|---|---|
| Norwegian Singles Chart | 13 |
