= Russ music =

Norwegian subgenre of electronic dance music

- Native name: Russemusikk; Russelåt(er), Russesang(er)
- Stylistic origins: Electronic dance; techno; eurobeat; eurodance; dirty rap; hardcore; trap
- Cultural origins: Mid 2000s (decade), Eastern Norway
- Typical instruments: Digital audio workstation; synthesizers; subwoofer

Russ music (Norwegian: russemusikk) is a subgenre of electronic dance music and a music scene which originated from Norway during the mid-2000s. Drawing inspiration from EDM, hip hop and techno, russ music is characterized by its fast tempo, synthesizers, notable bass and explicit lyrics, often combined with rapping.

Usually, this type of music is produced on request by Norwegian high school graduates to promote their "russ concept" as a part of russefeiring. Russefeiring is a way for students in Norway to celebrate their completion of thirteen years of schooling. The celebration traditionally starts between April 20th and May 1st, depending on the specific town or county, and continues until Norway’s National Day on May 17th.

Russ music has lately been labeled as a controversial genre as a part of a constantly growing market. Record producers are heavily criticized for their use of explicit lyrics, as the distribution of russ music has grown to be an independent music industry in Norway.

== Notable artists ==
Russ music producers

- Tix / The Pøssy Project
- Soppgirobygget
- El Papi
- Dj Smellhodet
- DJ Loppetiss
- BEK & Wallin
- Roc Boyz
- BEK & Moberg
- Kudos
- Golfklubb
- KANSELLERT
- Truse Tarzan
- Smörebua
- Fjelltopp
- Lurifaks
- Spasme
- Mackarinø
- Hugge
- Olav Haust
- Solguden & Mannen
- Sandmans
- Ringnes-Ronny
- Kuselofte
- Öresus
- Heux
- B3nte
- LIL FAT
- Prells
- J-Dawg
- Lille Saus
- Kobojsarna
- FERDY / Sleiken

Recurring producers

- Skrillex (one time)
- ItaloBrothers
- Technikore

Former producers

- Mikkel Christiansen / Simen A
- Kygo
- DJ Walkzz
- Ketz
- K-391
- Tungevaag / Tungevaag & Raaban
- Stian K
- Russetunes
- Lensko

== See also ==
- Russefeiring
