= Make It Good =

Make It Good may refer to:

- Make It Good (album), an album by the band a1.
  - "Make It Good" (A1 song), the title track and second single from the above album.
- "Make It Good", a song by The Beach Boys from their album Carl and the Passions – "So Tough".
