= Pray for Me (Kristin Husøy song) =

2020 song by Kristin Husøy

Single by Kristin Husøy
- Released: 20 January 2020
- Genre: Pop; gospel; soul; R&B
- Length: 2:58
- Label: Toukan; Symphonic
- Songwriters: Galeyn Tenhaeff; Marcia Thadea Angele Sondeijker; Neil Hollyn; Roel Rats
- Producer: Roel Rats

Kristin Husøy singles chronology
| "It's a Man's Man's Man's World" (2019) | "Pray for Me" (2020) | "Love on the Brain" (2021) |

Lyric video
- "Pray for Me" on YouTube

"Pray for Me" is a song by Norwegian singer Kristin Husøy. The song was released as a single on 20 January 2020. The song competed on Melodi Grand Prix 2020 and finished as a runner-up.

== Background and composition ==
"Pray for Me" was composed and written by Dutch songwriters Galeyn Tenhaeff, Marcia Thadea Angele Sondeijker, Neil Hollyn, and Roel Rats. The latter also produced the song. The song, originally written in a man's perspective, was described as a portrayal of a person in a difficult relationship in which "a partner means no good to the other, but despite that the person still chooses to stay because it is so in love." Husøy added, "it is like when you’re screwed and you just [got to] pray for yourself to make it out in one piece."

== Reception ==
Anders Grønneberg from Dagbladet praised the track for its blend of "smooth soul, gritty gospel, and smoldering R&B", noting that Husøy delivered the song with a confident, character-driven vocal performance to which he called "slightly sassy and seductive". He also commended her live stage presence and mature taste, citing influences such as Amy Winehouse, Lauryn Hill, and Ella Fitzgerald. Writing for NRK, Marit Johansen Jegthaug gave the song a three out of six, commending Husøy's vocals by calling it "impressively raw" and "soulful" to which she deemed "perfect for the genre". She also compared the song's intro to the Norwegian drama series Heimebane and "Mmm Mmm Mmm Mmm" by Crash Test Dummies. However, while Jegthaug described the track as a "perfectly decent radio song with nice vocals", she criticised it for having a flat progression that "never really builds any tension".

== Melodi Grand Prix 2020 ==
On 6 January 2020, it was announced that the song will be competing in Melodi Grand Prix 2020, Norway's national selection for the Eurovision Song Contest 2020. The song was drawn to compete in the third semi-final on 25 January 2020, and later qualified to the final. In the final, the song qualified to the gold final, and subsequently qualified to the gold duel. The song ultimately lost against the song "Attention" by Ulrikke Brandstorp with a margin of 5,678 votes.

== Credits and personnel ==
Credits are adapted from Apple Music.

- Roel Rats – songwriter, producer, mixing engineer
- Galeyn Tenhaeff – songwriter
- Marcia Thadea Angele Sondeijker – songwriter
- Neil Hollyn – songwriter
- Björn Engelmann – mastering engineer

== Track listing ==
Digital download/streaming

1. "Pray for Me" – 2:58

Digital download/streaming – Acoustic version

1. "Pray for Me (Acoustic)" – 3:05

Digital download/streaming – Remixes

1. "Pray for Me - CLRS Remix" – 2:28
2. "Pray for Me - SFRNG Remix" – 2:41
3. "Pray for Me - Lancie Green & Luma. Remix" – 3:50
4. "Pray for Me - Pegato Remix" – 3:22
5. "Pray for Me - Senio Remix" – 3:07
6. "Pray for Me - Patay Remix" – 3:26
7. "Pray for Me - Mikael Johnson Remix" – 3:26
8. "Pray for Me - Foxela Remix" – 2:23

== Charts ==
Chart performance for "Pray for Me"
| Chart (2020) | Peak position |
|---|---|
| Norway (IFPI Norge) | 38 |

== Release history ==
Release dates and formats for "Pray for Me"
| Region | Date | Format(s) | Label | Type | Ref. |
|---|---|---|---|---|---|
| Various | 20 January 2020 | Digital download; streaming | Toukan; Symphonic | Single | |
| Various | 15 February 2020 | Digital download; streaming | Toukan; Symphonic | Acoustic version | |
| Various | 27 April 2020 | Digital download; streaming | Toukan; Symphonic | CLRS remix | |
| Various | 27 April 2020 | Digital download; streaming | Toukan; Symphonic | SFRNG remix | |
| Various | 27 April 2020 | Digital download; streaming | Toukan; Symphonic | Lancie Green & Luma. remix | |
| Various | 27 April 2020 | Digital download; streaming | Toukan; Symphonic | Pegato remix | |
| Various | 27 April 2020 | Digital download; streaming | Toukan; Symphonic | Senio remix | |
| Various | 27 April 2020 | Digital download; streaming | Toukan; Symphonic | Patay remix | |
| Various | 27 April 2020 | Digital download; streaming | Toukan; Symphonic | Mikael Johnson remix | |
| Various | 8 October 2021 | Digital download; streaming | WATF Music | Foxela remix | |
