= Take You Home (A1 song) =

Single by A1

from the album Waiting for Daylight
- Released: 2 November 2009
- Recorded: 2009
- Genre: Pop
- Length: 3:29
- Label: Sony BMG
- Songwriters: Hans Petter Aaserud, Ben Adams, Christian Ingebrigtsen, Mark Read
- Producer: Hans Petter Aaserud

A1 singles chronology
"Nos Differences" (2002)	"Take You Home" (2009)	"Don't Wanna Lose You Again" (2010)

"Take You Home" is a song by British-Norwegian boyband A1, released as the lead single from their fourth studio album, Waiting for Daylight. Released nearly a year prior to the album, it was the group's first single release not to feature former band member Paul Marazzi, as he left the group seven years prior. The single was released on 2 November 2009 in Norway only, after heavy promotion of the song on The X Factor in Norway. The song peaked at No. 9 on the Norwegian Singles Chart, and at No. 3 on Norwegian iTunes. The track also served as the 2009 Norwegian Comic Relief charity single.

== Chart positions ==
Chart (2009)	Peak position
Norwegian Singles Chart	9

=== Year-end charts ===
Chart (2009)	Peak position
Norwegian Singles Chart (Julen Period)	18
