= Tix =

Norwegian singer, songwriter and music producer

TIX
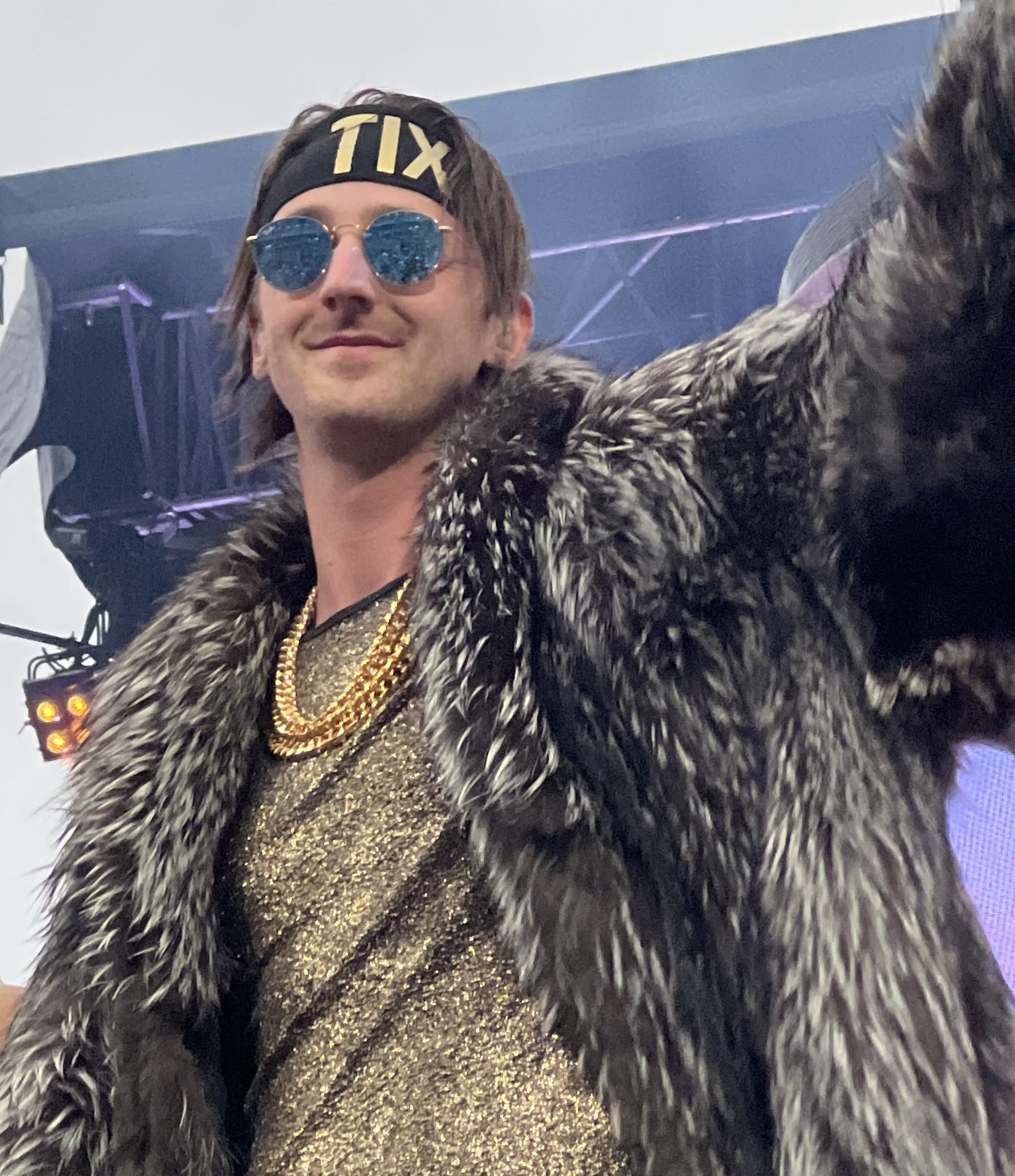
- TIX in 2022

Background information
- Born: Andreas Haukeland; 12 April 1993 (age 33); Bærum, Norway
- Genres: Pop; EDM; Russ music
- Occupations: Singer; songwriter; producer
- Years active: 2012–present

Andreas Haukeland (born 12 April 1993), better known as Tix (stylized in all caps), is a Norwegian singer. He represented Norway at the Eurovision Song Contest 2021 with the song "Fallen Angel".

Haukeland has Tourette syndrome, a condition characterised by involuntary movements called tics. During his childhood, he was bullied for his condition and he was called "Tics", which he later turned into his stage name. Besides being a musician, Haukeland is a mental health awareness advocate and has shared his experiences with Tourette syndrome, as well as loneliness and suicidal thoughts.

In 2019, Haukeland was a part of Norwegian Paradise Hotel, season 11, checking in as a VIP contestant. After his long run that season, he was part of the jury deciding the winners.

== Early life ==
Haukeland was born on 12 April 1993. During his school years, he was bullied for his Tourette syndrome and his tics, leading to him struggling with his mental health for most of his life. During a conversation with his mom, he said "I don't think I'll ever get a girlfriend. I don't think I'll ever find someone who can love me and accept my tics. I don't think anyone will consider me normal... most importantly, I don't think I'll ever find a girl that will have children with me, someone that will marry me. I don't think that's in the cards for me."

In 2010, during a russ celebration, Haukeland's girlfriend at the time asked him if he could write a song for the bus crew. This would be his first russ song. In 2011, he would submit a song for that year's Melodi Grand Prix 2011, but to no avail. The song is not planned to ever be released in any media form.

== Career ==
=== 2013–2019: Russ music, controversy, and struggles with mental health ===
TIX is known for his Russ music, with many of his songs being known for controversial, misogynist, and sexist lyrics. Haukeland offered three explanations for the song "Sjeiken": it was satire, it was a result of supply and demand, it was a provocation for the sake of provocation.

In 2015, he was featured in several Staysman and Lazz music videos in which he is seen doing various things, including touching the instructor's breast during a sex ed class, partying excessively and waking up with a man in bed, who he kisses on the forehead before leaving, albeit in a hurry.

Between 2015 and 2017, he would release many songs, all in russ music; 19 in 2015, 17 in 2016, and 12 in 2017.

In September 2016, TIX released his debut studio album, Dømt og berømt, which peaked at number 2 on the VG-lista, the official Norwegian Albums Chart.

In 2017, he would be a co-producer for the song "Game Time" by Flo Rida. In the summer of 2017, TIX was a warm-up artist for Justin Bieber at Forus Travbane in Stavanger. He would also co produce the song "Sweet but Psycho" by Ava Max in 2018.

In 2018, he released his first non-russ pop song, "Shotgun" which reached No. 5 in the singles chart in Norway. However, in the same year and in 2019 he would also create new russ songs, but with a new theme of a foreboding party burnout and depression.

=== 2019–2020: Paradise Hotel, Norwegian Idol, new music videos ===
In 2019, he was a contestant on Paradise Hotel as a VIP contestant. Before the show, he was interviewed by Dagbladet, where he said "It's like.. now or never. I will die young. (…) Brutally honest." After the show, he was once again interviewed, this time by Se og Hør Norge, where he randomly asked the interviewer who had a fortune teller toy "I wonder if I’m gonna die before I’m 30? Because that’s the plan really.”

In 2020, he was a judge on the Norwegian version of Pop Idol, called Norwegian Idol.

=== 2021: Melodi Grand Prix, Eurovision Song Contest, opening up about mental health struggles ===
On 15 January 2021, during an interview on Norwegian talk show "Lindmo", Haukeland told of how he tried to commit suicide in 2018. He said the character of Tix had completely taken over and that there was no room for the real Andreas. He was crying on the floor of his bathroom when his cat, Findus, came in to comfort him. Haukeland told Findus about his troubles and, to this day, he says that Findus saved his life.

On 20 February 2021, Tix won the Melodi Grand Prix 2021 with the song "Fallen Angel", and thus earned the right to represent Norway at the Eurovision Song Contest 2021 in Rotterdam. A week later, he apologized for the lyrics he used in his old russ songs on Instagram, saying in part "The Russ era is a time that is normless, that is boundless by nature and that acts as a valve for young people. The music is made to be played in that context. It is made for young people, who party, who drink and who have sex. Could and should I have used other words and phrases? In retrospect - yes. My focus was on the party and the community. My heart's desire... I have, or have never had, any intention of hurting anyone. I want to apologize to everyone who has felt trampled on by the songs. That was not the intention, and I am genuinely sorry." However, he would also say that he would not change anything that he did in the past; he simply had said that he was sorry some had been offended.

On 4 May 2021, two weeks before the first semi-final of the Eurovision Song Contest 2021, Tix released the music video for "Fallen Angel", in which he recreates a moment from his youth where he's bullied for his Tourettes syndrome as well as shows the genesis of the Tix persona. The song would qualify from the first semi-final, finishing 10th place with 118 points, and would finish the grand final in 18th place with 75 points. During the performance, he took off his glasses in order to show his tics to the audience, saying "I'll show the biggest weakness I could do on a stage... I think it will help/comfort/inspire to many out there." He created a 10 part vlog series on social media, which detailed his journeys and experiences at Eurovision, including traveling around Rotterdam and Amsterdam, behind the scenes footage, and a dedicated video to Azerbaijani singer Samira Efendi.

On 14 May 2021, Tix released the single "Engel, Ikke Dra", which was a dedication to a fan of his, Aurora Buerskog, who died from cancer in the summer of 2019. One of her last wishes was to have Tix attend her funeral. Her funeral in Stavanger was the same day as a concert he was doing for VG-Lista in Bergen. He attended the funeral first and then went to perform for a crowd of over 10,000. In an Instagram post on the day of the single's release, he says he was struck with the following thought after getting off the stage that day: "How many of these kids are going through hard times right now? How many people struggle with anxiety, eating disorders, exclusion, violence, loneliness, bullying, etc.? And the biggest question: Statistically speaking… How many of these are perhaps no longer with us the next time I return to the city? That was the beginning of a new chapter, and the reason I chose to show the humanity behind TIX. Meeting Aurora made me understand how important my music is in many people's everyday lives. And therefore I want to be the soundtrack to both the good and the bad moments."

== Personal life ==
Haukeland has become an outspoken advocate of mental health and has shared many of his experiences of struggles with it.

From early 2019 to late 2020, he was in a relationship with Marthe Elise Brenne, a Norwegian influencer, whom he met and was partnered with in Paradise Hotel. Brenne won Paradise Hotel in 2019. Haukeland dedicated one of his songs, 'Deg Eller Ingenting', to Marthe in June 2020 and shared on his Instagram romantic photos of the couple saying "I do not have many close ones around me, but over the past year Marthe has been an important part of my life. I love her so much. Actually love her."

On 18 October 2021, Haukeland released a book, TIX: Den Stygge Andungen (The Ugly Duckling), based on his childhood in which he tells the story of himself. Nearly two weeks after its release, it became Norway's best-selling non-fiction children book.

== Discography ==
=== Albums ===
Title	Details	Peak chart positions
Title	Details	NOR
Dømt og berømt	Released: 9 September 2016; Label: Sony Music; Format: Digital download, CD	2
Enten går det bra, ellers går det over	Released: 28 March 2022; Label: Universal; Format: Digital download, streaming	3

=== Singles ===
==== As lead artist ====
Title	Year	Peak chart positions							Album
Title	Year	NOR	BEL (FL) Tip	FIN	LIT	NLD	SWE	UK Down.	Album
"Fraternity"	2014	—	—	—	—	—	—	—	Non-album singles
"Sjeiken 2015" (with The Pøssy Project)	2015	5	—	—	—	—	— (Note: "Sjeiken 2015" did not enter the Swedish Singellista Chart, but peaked at number one on the Swedish Heatseeker Chart.)	—	Non-album singles
"Habbo Club 2015" (with The Pøssy Project)	2015	22	—	—	—	—	—	—	Non-album singles
"East High 2016" (with The Pøssy Project)	2015	—	—	—	—	—	—	—	Dømt og berømt
"Hydra 2016" (with The Pøssy Project)	2016	15	—	—	—	—	—	—	Dømt og berømt
"Uncle Sam 2016" (with The Pøssy Project)	2016	—	—	—	—	—	—	—	Dømt og berømt
"Ponyville 2016" (with The Pøssy Project)	2016	17	—	—	—	—	—	—	Dømt og berømt
"Tronen 2016" (with The Pøssy Project, Meland & Hauken)	2016	24	—	—	—	—	—	—	Dømt og berømt
"Dory 2017" (with The Pøssy Project)	2016	8	—	—	—	—	—	—	Dømt og berømt
"Versarce 2017" (with The Pøssy Project)	2016	5	—	—	—	—	—	—	Non-album singles
"Gullalderen 2017" (with The Pøssy Project)	2016	33	—	—	—	—	—	—	Non-album singles
"Skammekroken 2017" (with The Pøssy Project)	2017	25	—	—	—	—	—	—	Non-album singles
"Baymax 2017" (with The Pøssy Project)	2017	—	—	—	—	—	—	—	Non-album singles
"Skaperen 2017" (with The Pøssy Project)	2017	—	—	—	—	—	—	—	Non-album singles
"Tyven 2017" (with The Pøssy Project)	2017	—	—	—	—	—	—	—	Non-album singles
"Geriljaen 2017" (with The Pøssy Project)	2017	—	—	—	—	—	—	—	Non-album singles
"Hakkebakkeskogen 2017" (with Meland & Hauken)	2017	32	—	—	—	—	—	—	Non-album singles
"Ulovlig" (with Moberg)	2017	22	—	—	—	—	—	—	Non-album singles
"Kobraen" (with Moberg)	2017	—	—	—	—	—	—	—	Non-album singles
"Future 2018" (with Moberg)	2017	—	—	—	—	—	—	—	Non-album singles
"Bad Boy" (with Moberg)	2017	—	—	—	—	—	—	—	Non-album singles
"Banken 2018" (with The Pøssy Project)	2018	—	—	—	—	—	—	—	Non-album singles
"Blåfjell 2018" (with Tunge Ferrari)	2018	—	—	—	—	—	—	—	Non-album singles
"Gatebarna 2018" (with Bougee)	2018	—	—	—	—	—	—	—	Non-album singles
"Nasjonen 2018" (with The Pøssy Project)	2018	29	—	—	—	—	—	—	Non-album singles
"Bergen 2018" (with The Pøssy Project)	2018	—	—	—	—	—	—	—	Non-album singles
"Shotgun"	2018	5	—	—	—	—	—	—	Non-album singles
"Makten 2019" (with The Pøssy Project)	2018	—	—	—	—	—	—	—	Non-album singles
"Håper nissen har råd"	2018	5	—	—	—	—	—	—	Non-album singles
"Snøstorm 2019" (with The Pøssy Project)	2018	—	—	—	—	—	—	—	Non-album singles
"Jeg vil ikke leve"	2019	1	—	—	—	—	—	—	Enten går det bra, ellers går det over
"Neste sommer"	2019	3	—	—	—	—	—	—	Non-album singles
"Når jeg er full"	2019	14	—	—	—	—	—	—	Non-album singles
"Brosjan Jesus"	2019	20	—	—	—	—	—	—	Non-album singles
"Jævlig"	2019	3	—	—	—	—	—	—	Non-album singles
"Kaller på deg"	2020	1	—	—	—	—	—	—	Non-album singles
"Karantene"	2020	1	—	—	—	—	—	—	Non-album singles
"Skål"	2020	2	—	—	—	—	—	—	Non-album singles
"Karantän" (with Samir & Viktor)	2020	—	—	—	—	—	56	—	Non-album singles
"Dommedagen 2020" (with Soppgirobygett)	2020	17	—	—	—	—	—	—	Non-album singles
"Deg eller ingenting" (with Morgan Sulele)	2020	4	—	—	—	—	—	—	Non-album singles
"Nå koser vi oss"	2020	4	—	—	—	—	—	—	Non-album singles
"Ikke han" (with Teddy)	2020	—	—	—	—	—	—	—	Non-album singles
"Jul i karantene"	2020	10	—	—	—	—	—	—	Non-album singles
"Tusen tårer"	2020	6	—	—	—	—	—	—	Enten går det bra, ellers går det over
"Ut av mørket"	2021	1	—	—	—	—	—	—	Enten går det bra, ellers går det over
"Fallen Angel"	2021	2	18	20	23	65	41	15	Enten går det bra, ellers går det over
"Engel, ikke dra"	2021	1	—	—	—	—	—	—	Enten går det bra, ellers går det over
"Beautifull"	2021	3	—	—	—	—	—	—	Non-album single
"Jente i Oslo"	2021	3	—	—	—	—	—	—	Hver gang vi møtes
"Sov godt"	2022	37	—	—	—	—	—	—	Hver gang vi møtes
"Bli hos meg"	2022	—	—	—	—	—	—	—	Hver gang vi møtes
"Av og på"	2022	—	—	—	—	—	—	—	Hver gang vi møtes
"Hvis jeg forlot verden"	2022	2	—	—	—	—	—	—	Enten går det bra, ellers går det over
"Delux"	2022	—	—	—	—	—	—	—	Non-album single
"Himmelen og helvete"	2022	9	—	—	—	—	—	—	Enten går det bra, ellers går det over
"Pust"	2022	7	—	—	—	—	—	—	Enten går det bra, ellers går det over
"Gjør med meg"	2022	15	—	—	—	—	—	—	Enten går det bra, ellers går det over
"Livet er herlig" (with El Papi)	2022	6	—	—	—	—	—	—	Non-album singles
"Gatebil" (with Hagle)	2022	18	—	—	—	—	—	—	Non-album singles
"Fakk meg opp" (with Kris Winther)	2023	11	—	—	—	—	—	—	Non-album singles
"Studio 23" (with The Pøssy Project)	2023	27	—	—	—	—	—	—	Non-album singles
"Danse en gang til" (with Morgan Sulele)	2023	7	—	—	—	—	—	—	Non-album singles
"Love </3" (with Beathoven)	2023	2	—	—	—	—	—	—	Non-album singles
"Piller i hjertet" (with Kudos)	2024	4	—	—	—	—	—	—	Non-album singles
"Forevig" (with Fjellrev and Hytta)	2024	8	—	—	—	—	—	—	Non-album singles
"Ole brumm" (with Morgan Sulele)	2024	13	—	—	—	—	—	—	Non-album singles
"Scandihoe" (featuring Krobbe)	2025	37	—	—	—	—	—	—	Non-album singles
"Crazy" (with Hauken)	2026	71	—	—	—	—	—	—	Non-album singles
"—" denotes a single that did not chart or was not released.

==== As featured artist ====
Title	Year	Peak chart positions	Album
Title	Year	NOR	Album
"The Tramp" (Olly Hence featuring JStanley & Tix)	2015	—	Non-album single
"Igjen og igjen" (El Papi featuring Tix)	2020	1	TBA
"Svenskejævel" (Ylvis featuring Tix, Staysman, Katastrofe and Alexander Rybak))	2025	4	Non-album single

== Notes ==
Awards and achievements
Preceded by Ulrikke with "Attention"	Norway in the Eurovision Song Contest; 2021	Succeeded by Subwoolfer with "Give That Wolf a Banana"
