= Ganjaman 2015 =

Single by Alfons
- Released: February 11, 2015
- Recorded: 2014
- Length: 3:07
- Songwriter: Vahid Arse

Alfons singles chronology
| "Ganjaman 2015" (2015) | "Ablaze 2015" (2015) |

Music video
- "Ganjaman 2015" on YouTube

Music video
- "Ganjaman AlphaNerd Remix" on YouTube

"Ganjaman 2015" is a song by Swedish DJ and producer Alfons. The song was made for the russ from Røyken in 2015. The song was first released on YouTube on October 10, 2014, before being released as a single on February 11, 2015. The song became a big hit in Sweden, peaking at number 2 on the Sverigetopplistan, the official Swedish singles chart. It also charted on the top 10 on the Danish and Finnish singles charts, as well as peaking at number 1 on Poland's Airplay New chart.

The song's lyrics are about the "Ganjaman", a man dealing in ganja and cannabis paraphernalia, who is also described as "the biggest man" from Ace of Base and from Azkaban, a fictitious prison location in Harry Potter. The song's lyrics also contains references to London and Jamaica.

== Background ==
The song was originally made for the russ of a secondary school in Røyken, Norway.

== Music videos ==
Two music videos were released for the song. The first video, released on YouTube on October 10, 2014, showcases a still image of the titular Ganjaman character in a jungle setting, with a 3D animated monkey and a clip of Snoop Dogg from the "Drop It Like It's Hot" music video dancing next to him. The video has over 117 million views as of March 2021.

The second video, released on May 29, 2015, features a family watching a TV program which is interrupted suddenly by a man warning them about the song Ganjaman, stating that the song will "drive people crazy". The warning broadcast is also interrupted, this time by a video of a disturbing puppet singing the song. The father begins to go crazy and dance around with furniture such as lamps and plants, before walking into a bingo salon where the song also begins playing. Eventually, the father begins partying with the people in the salon. The video has over 15 million views as of March 2021.

== Charts ==
=== Weekly charts ===
| Chart (2015) | Peak position |
|---|---|
| Austria (Ö3 Austria Top 40) | 43 |
| Denmark (Tracklisten) | 9 |
| Finland (Suomen virallinen lista) | 6 |
| France (SNEP) | 147 |
| Norway (VG-lista) | 21 |
| Poland Airplay (ZPAV) | 22 |
| Poland Dance (ZPAV) | 5 |
| Poland (Polish Airplay New) | 1 |
| Sweden (Sverigetopplistan) | 2 |

=== Year-end charts ===
| Chart (2015) | Position |
|---|---|
| Denmark (Tracklisten) | 47 |
| Sweden (Sverigetopplistan) | 17 |

== Certifications ==
| Region | Certification | Certified units/sales |
|---|---|---|
| Denmark (IFPI Danmark) | Platinum | 60,000^{^} |
| Norway (IFPI Norway) | Platinum | 40,000^{‡} |
| Sweden (GLF) | 4× Platinum | 160,000^{‡} |
^{^} Shipments figures based on certification alone.^{‡} Sales+streaming figures based on certification alone.
