= Pray for Me =

Pray for Me may refer to:

== Songs ==
- "Pray for Me" (Darey song), 2015
- "Pray for Me" (The Weeknd and Kendrick Lamar song), 2018
- "Pray for Me" (Kristin Husøy song), 2020
- "Pray for Me", a song by Michael W. Smith from the album I 2 (EYE), 1988
- "Pray for Me", a song by the Jayhawks from the album Tomorrow the Green Grass, 1995
- "Pray for Me", a song by Mobb Deep from the album Infamy, 2001
- "Pray for Me", a song by Sixx:A.M. from the album The Heroin Diaries Soundtrack, 2007
- "Pray for Me", a song by G-Eazy from the album The Beautiful & Damned, 2017
- "Pray for Me", a song by Reks from Grey Hairs, 2008
- "Pray for Me", a 2014 song by rapper Bizarre

== Films ==
- Pray for Me: The Jason Jessee Film, a documentary film about professional skateboarder Jason Jessee
- Francis: Pray for Me, a 2015 film about Pope Francis

== See also ==
- "Mama Don't Forget to Pray for Me", a song by Diamond Rio
