= Waiting for Daylight =

Waiting for Daylight may refer to:

- Waiting for Daylight (A1 album), 2010
  - "Waiting for Daylight" (song), its title song
- Waiting for Daylight (Infernal album), 2000
