= Don't Wanna Lose You Again =

Single by A1

from the album Waiting for Daylight
- Released: 22 January 2010
- Recorded: 2009
- Genre: Pop rock
- Length: 3:28
- Label: Sony BMG
- Songwriters: Ben Adams, Christian Ingebrigtsen, Mark Read, David Eriksen
- Producer: A1

A1 singles chronology
"Take You Home" (2009)	"Don't Wanna Lose You Again" (2010)	"In Love and I Hate It" (2010)

"Don't Wanna Lose You Again" (mis-spelt on the cover art as "Don't Wanna Loose You Again") is a song by British-Norwegian boy band A1, released as the second single from their fourth studio album, Waiting for Daylight (2010).

== Background ==
Following the success of Take You Home, A1 announced they were writing a song for entry in the Eurovision Song Contest 2010, to represent Norway. As Norway were the holders of the contest that year, the band had to go through a tough audition process, competing against another twenty artists. The group appeared in the third semi-final, beating public favourite Mira Craig to win a place in the final. In the final, the band placed within the top four acts to go through to the "Gold Final", in which the final vote was left to the judging panel and the home television audience. The top four acts performed one last time to impress the judges. During the second verse, band member Ben Adams forgot the words due to a large amount of noise produced by the studio crowd. Despite this, the song received over 264,000 votes to be entered as Norway's official song, but came second to Didrik Solli-Tangen's "My Heart Is Yours", which scooped over 440,000 votes.

The single was officially released via digital download on 22 January 2010, just hours after its success in the semi-final. On 28 January 2010, the single entered and peaked at number four on the Norwegian Singles Chart.

== Music video ==
Despite no music video officially being created, UK music channel The Vault began airing a music video for the song in January 2012, containing footage of the group's semi-final performance in Norway and footage of the band appearing on Live at Studio Five in November 2011. The video has since been uploaded to YouTube by amateur users, and has a running time of three-minutes and nineteen seconds. It is currently unknown when the video was produced, and whether or not it is an official video.

== Track listing ==
- Digital download
1. "Don't Wanna Lose You Again" - 3:28

== Chart positions ==
Chart (2010)	Peak position
Norwegian Singles Chart	4

=== Year-end charts ===
Chart (2010)	Peak position
Norwegian Singles Chart (Vinter Period)	15
