= Melodi Grand Prix 2020 =

58th edition of Melodi Grand Prix

Dates and venues
- Semi-final 1: 11 January 2020
- Semi-final 2: 18 January 2020
- Semi-final 3: 25 January 2020
- Semi-final 4: 1 February 2020
- Semi-final 5: 8 February 2020; H3 Arena, Fornebu
- Final: 15 February 2020; Trondheim Spektrum, Trondheim

Organisation
- Broadcaster: Norsk rikskringkasting (NRK)
- Presenters: Ronny Brede Aase; Kåre Magnus Bergh; Ingrid Gjessing Linhave

Participants
- Number of entries: 25

Vote
- Winning song: "Attention" by Ulrikke Brandstorp

Melodi Grand Prix 2020 was the 58th edition of the Norwegian music competition Melodi Grand Prix (MGP) and served as the country's preselection for the Eurovision Song Contest 2020. The competition was organized by NRK between 11 January 2020 and 15 February 2020, and a total of 25 songs participated – the highest number in the history of the competition.

To celebrate the 60th anniversary of Norway's debut in the Eurovision Song Contest, five heats and a final were organised instead of a single final. Each region in Norway was assigned its own heat, in which four acts from that region competed for a spot in the final on 15 February 2020. In addition, five pre-qualified finalists had been selected by the broadcaster. The heats were held in the H3 Arena in Fornebu, while the final took place in Trondheim Spektrum. This was the first time Trondheim hosted a Melodi Grand Prix final, and also the first time since 1989 that the final was not held in Oslo.

Kåre Magnus Bergh hosted Melodi Grand Prix for the sixth time, while Ronny Brede Aase and Ingrid Gjessing Linhave debuted as presenters of the competition. In the final, the pre-qualified entry "Attention" by Ulrikke Brandstorp received the most votes and was selected to represent Norway in the Eurovision Song Contest 2020 in Rotterdam, Netherlands, before it was cancelled on 18 March 2020 due to the COVID-19 pandemic.

== Format ==
=== Song submissions ===
As in previous years, NRK had invited Norwegian and foreign musicians to submit songs for the competition. Registration for Melodi Grand Prix 2020 opened on 2 March 2019, with the deadline being 31 July of the same year. Each submission had to have at least one Norwegian songwriter, and each songwriter could submit a maximum of three contributions. These changes to the rules led to a significant decrease in the number of songs submitted. In total, the broadcaster received about 800 submissions, compared to about 1,000 in previous years. A total of 25 songs were selected to participate in the competition: 20 songs were divided over the five heats, and five songs qualified directly for the final.

=== Shows ===
2020 marked the 60th anniversary of Norway's debut in the Eurovision Song Contest 1960 with the song "Voi Voi" by Nora Brockstedt. On the occasion of the anniversary, NRK decided to expand the competition with five heats. This is the first time since 2014 that NRK organised heats ahead of the finals.

Each of the five heats was centered around one of Norway's geographical regions: Northern, Central, Western, Southern and Eastern Norway. Four acts from each of these regions competed in their respective heats for a spot in the final on 15 February. The heats were broadcast directly from the H3 Arena in Fornebu, while the final was hosted by Trondheim Spektrum. This was the third time a Melodi Grand Prix final had been held outside of Oslo, and the first time since 1989. It was also the first time that Trondheim hosted the final.

The competition was hosted by three presenters. Kåre Magnus Bergh hosted for the sixth time, whereas Ronny Brede Aase and Ingrid Gjessing Linhave hosted the show for the first time.

Show	Date	Region	Venue
Heat 1	11 January 2020	Southern Norway	H3 Arena, Fornebu
Heat 2	18 January 2020	Eastern Norway	H3 Arena, Fornebu
Heat 3	25 January 2020	Central Norway	H3 Arena, Fornebu
Heat 4	1 February 2020	Western Norway	H3 Arena, Fornebu
Heat 5	8 February 2020	Northern Norway	H3 Arena, Fornebu
Final	15 February 2020	—N/a	Trondheim Spektrum

=== Voting ===
The audience could vote for the competing acts in each heat, with the act that received most votes after two rounds proceeding to the final. A jury led by Stig Karlsen, the Norwegian head of delegation for the Eurovision Song Contest, selected the five pre-qualified finalists. In each heat, one of the pre-qualified finalists performed to ensure equal broadcasting time for all ten finalists. Viewers could only vote through the broadcaster's website nrk.no.

In the final, the same method of online voting was used to determine the winner of the competition. Due to excessive server load caused by the emoji reaction function of the app, the four gold finalists were determined by a thirty-member backup demoscopic panel as the NRK website was down.

== Competing entries ==
The competing acts were announced during a press conference in Oslo on 6 January.

Artist	Song	Composer(s)
Akuvi	"Som du er"	Andreas "Stone" Johansson, Costa Leon, Amin Zana, Beatrice Akuvi Kumordzie
Alexandru	"Pink Jacket"	Ruben Markussen, Tormod Løkling
Didrik & Emil Solli-Tangen	"Out of Air"	Fredrik Boström, Mats Tärnfors, Niclas Lundin, Didrik Solli-Tangen
Elin & The Woods	"We Are as One"	Robin Lynch, Elin Kåven, Ylva Persson, Linda Persson
Geirmund	"Come Alive"	Eric Lumiere, Jonas H. Jensen, Niklas Rosström
Hege Bjerk	"Pang"	Martin Bjerkreim, Trygve Stakkeland, Hege Bjerkreim
Anna Jæger	"How About Mars"	Roel Rats, Synne Vorkinn, Chris Wortley, Sindre T. Jenssen
Jenny Jenssen	"Mr. Hello"	Mats Larsson, Jørgen Andson, Jenny Jenssen
Kevin Boine	"Stem på mæ"	Henning Olerud, Stanley Ferdinandez
Kim André Rysstad	"Rainbow"	Knut Bjørnar Asphol, Kim André Rysstad
Kim Wigaard & Maria Mohn	"Fool for Love"	Torbjørn Raae, Arve Furset, Kim Wigaard Johansen, Maria Mohn
Kristin Husøy	"Pray for Me"	Galeyn Tenhaeff, Neil Hollyn, Marcia Sondeijker, Roel Rats, Kristin Husøy
Lisa Børud	"Talking About Us"	Jimmy Jansson, Anderz Wrethov, Maia Wright, Laurell Barker
Liza Vassilieva	"I Am Gay"	Audun Agnar Guldbrandsen, Stian Nyhammer Olsen, Myrtoula Røe, Liza Vassilieva
Magnus Bokn	"Over the Sea"	Alexander Rybak, Joakim With Steen, Magnus Bokn
Nordic Tenors	"In This Special Place"	Einar Kristiansen Five, Jan-Tore Saltnes
Oda Loves You	"Love Who We Love"	Magnus Bertelsen, Oda Evjen Gjøvåg
Raylee	"Wild"	Andreas "Stone" Johansson, Anderz Wrethov, Laurell Barker
Rein Alexander	"One Last Time"	Erik Smaaland, Kristoffer Tømmerbakke, Rein Alexander
Sie Gubba	"Kjære du"	Petter Øien, Magne Almås
Sondrey	"Take My Time"	Ola Frøyen, Eric Lumiere, Terchi Pippuri
Thomas Løseth & Erika Norwich	"Vertigo"	Idar Sørensen
Tone Damli	"Hurts Sometimes"	Helge Moen, Jim Bergsted, Jethro Fox, Tone Damli
Tore Petterson	"The Start of Something New"	Tore Petterson, Knut Bjørnar Asphol
Ulrikke Brandstorp	"Attention"	Christian Ingebrigtsen, Kjetil Mørland, Ulrikke Brandstorp

== Heats ==
=== Heat 1 – Southern Norway ===
The first heat took place on 11 January 2020 at the H3 Arena in Fornebu.

Heat 1 – 11 January 2020
Duel	R/O	Artist	Song	Result
Duel 1	1	Geirmund	"Come Alive"	—N/a
Duel 1	2	Lisa Børud	"Talking About Us"	Gold Duel
Duel 2	1	Kim André Rysstad	"Rainbow"	—N/a
Duel 2	2	Raylee	"Wild"	Gold Duel
Promo	—N/a	Sondrey	"Take My Time"	Pre-qualified

Gold Duel – 11 January 2020
R/O	Artist	Song	Result
1	Lisa Børud	"Talking About Us"	—N/a
2	Raylee	"Wild"	Finalist

=== Heat 2 – Eastern Norway ===
The second heat took place on 18 January 2020 at the H3 Arena in Fornebu.

Heat 2 – 18 January 2020
Duel	R/O	Artist	Song	Result
Duel 1	1	Tore Petterson	"The Start of Something New"	—N/a
Duel 1	2	Kim Wigaard & Maria Mohn	"Fool for Love"	Gold Duel
Duel 2	1	Anna Jæger	"How About Mars"	—N/a
Duel 2	2	Rein Alexander	"One Last Time"	Gold Duel
Promo	—N/a	Didrik & Emil Solli-Tangen	"Out of Air"	Pre-qualified

Gold Duel – 18 January 2020
R/O	Artist	Song	Result
1	Kim Wigaard & Maria Mohn	"Fool for Love"	—N/a
2	Rein Alexander	"One Last Time"	Finalist

=== Heat 3 – Central Norway ===
The third heat took place on 25 January 2020 at the H3 Arena in Fornebu.

Heat 3 – 25 January 2020
Duel	R/O	Artist	Song	Result
Duel 1	1	Alexandru	"Pink Jacket"	—N/a
Duel 1	2	Sie Gubba	"Kjære du"	Gold Duel
Duel 2	1	Thomas Løseth & Erika Norwich	"Vertigo"	—N/a
Duel 2	2	Kristin Husøy	"Pray for Me"	Gold Duel
Promo	—N/a	Akuvi	"Som du er"	Pre-qualified

Gold Duel – 25 January 2020
R/O	Artist	Song	Result
1	Sie Gubba	"Kjære du"	—N/a
2	Kristin Husøy	"Pray for Me"	Finalist

=== Heat 4 – Western Norway ===
The fourth heat took place on 1 February 2020 at the H3 Arena in Fornebu.

Heat 4 – 1 February 2020
Duel	R/O	Artist	Song	Result
Duel 1	1	Magnus Bokn	"Over the Sea"	Gold Duel
Duel 1	2	Oda Loves You	"Love Who We Love"	—N/a
Duel 2	1	Nordic Tenors	"In This Special Place"	Gold Duel
Duel 2	2	Hege Bjerk	"Pang"	—N/a
Promo	—N/a	Ulrikke Brandstorp	"Attention"	Pre-qualified

Gold Duel – 1 February 2020
R/O	Artist	Song	Result
1	Magnus Bokn	"Over the Sea"	Finalist
2	Nordic Tenors	"In This Special Place"	—N/a

=== Heat 5 – Northern Norway ===
The fifth heat took place on 8 February 2020 at the H3 Arena in Fornebu.

Heat 5 – 8 February 2020
Duel	R/O	Artist	Song	Result
Duel 1	1	Jenny Jenssen	"Mr. Hello"	—N/a
Duel 1	2	Elin & The Woods	"We Are as One"	Gold Duel
Duel 2	1	Kevin Boine	"Stem på mæ"	—N/a
Duel 2	2	Liza Vassilieva	"I Am Gay"	Gold Duel
Promo	—N/a	Tone Damli	"Hurts Sometimes"	Pre-qualified

Gold Duel – 8 February 2020
R/O	Artist	Song	Result
1	Elin & The Woods	"We Are as One"	—N/a
2	Liza Vassilieva	"I Am Gay"	Finalist

== Final ==
Ten songs consisting of the five heat winners alongside the five pre-qualified songs competed in the final which was hosted by Trondheim Spektrum in Trondheim on 15 February 2020. The running order for the final was announced on 10 February 2020. In the first round, all ten finalists performed once, after which the four best songs proceeded to the gold final. After a second voting round, the two best songs from the gold final proceeded to the gold duel. A third voting round then determined the winner of Melodi Grand Prix 2020.

After the gold duel, the results of the online voting were revealed by representatives of Norway's five regions, which led to the victory of "Attention" performed by Ulrikke Brandstorp.

Final – 15 February 2020
R/O	Artist	Song	Result
1	Raylee	"Wild"	Gold Final
2	Didrik & Emil Solli-Tangen	"Out of Air"	—N/a
3	Magnus Bokn	"Over the Sea"	—N/a
4	Akuvi	"Som du er"	—N/a
5	Kristin Husøy	"Pray for Me"	Gold Final
6	Rein Alexander	"One Last Time"	—N/a
7	Tone Damli	"Hurts Sometimes"	—N/a
8	Sondrey	"Take My Time"	—N/a
9	Ulrikke Brandstorp	"Attention"	Gold Final
10	Liza Vassilieva	"I Am Gay"	Gold Final

Gold Final – 15 February 2020
R/O	Artist	Song	Result
1	Kristin Husøy	"Pray for Me"	Gold Duel
2	Ulrikke Brandstorp	"Attention"	Gold Duel
3	Liza Vassilieva	"I Am Gay"	—N/a
4	Raylee	"Wild"	—N/a

Gold Duel – 15 February 2020
R/O	Artist	Song	South		Central		North		West		East		Total		Place
R/O	Artist	Song	Votes	%	Votes	%	Votes	%	Votes	%	Votes	%	Votes	%	Place
1	Kristin Husøy	"Pray for Me"	16,756	45.77	51,176	70.16	19,932	53.75	37,107	48.82	69,696	40.44	194,667	49.28	2
2	Ulrikke Brandstorp	"Attention"	19,854	54.23	21,770	29.84	17,152	46.25	38,906	51.18	102,663	59.56	200,345	50.72	1

=== Spokespersons ===
- Southern Norway – Tom Hugo (winner MGP 2019, as part of Keiino)
- Central Norway – Margaret Berger (winner MGP 2013)
- Northern Norway – Agnete Johnsen (winner MGP 2016)
- Western Norway – Bjørn Johan Muri (fourth place MGP 2010)
- Eastern Norway – Åge Sten Nilsen (winner MGP 2005, as part of Wig Wam)

== Ratings ==
Show	Air date	Viewers (millions)	Share	Ref.
Heat 1	11 January 2020	0.592	44%	
Final	15 February 2020	0.950	68%	

== See also ==
- Norway in the Eurovision Song Contest
- Norway in the Eurovision Song Contest 2020
- Eurovision Song Contest 2020
