= Make It Good (A1 song) =

2002 single by A1

Single by A1

from the album Make It Good
- B-side: "High and Dry"; "Do It Again"
- Released: 13 May 2002
- Length: 3:40
- Label: Columbia
- Songwriters: Ben Adams; Christian Ingebrigtsen; Mark Read
- Producer: A1

A1 singles chronology
"Caught in the Middle" (2002)	"Make It Good" (2002)	"Nos Differences" (2002)

Music video
- "Make It Good" on YouTube

"Make It Good" is a song by British-Norwegian boy band A1. It was released on 13 May 2002 as the second single from their third studio album, Make It Good (2002). The single peaked at No. 11 on the UK Singles Chart. A music video was produced to promote the single. Two versions of the video exist: one for the radio edit of the song and one for the extended version.

== Track listings ==
UK CD1

1. "Make It Good"
2. "High and Dry"
3. "Do It Again"
4. "Make It Good" (video)

UK CD2

1. "Make It Good" (extended version)
2. "Make It Good" (Johan S vocal mix)
3. "Caught in the Middle" (Almighty mix)
4. "Make It Good" (video and making of video)

UK cassette single

1. "Make It Good"
2. "Do It Again"

== Charts ==
=== Weekly charts ===
Chart (2002)	Peak position
Denmark (Tracklisten)	14
Denmark Airplay (Tracklisten)	19
Europe (Eurochart Hot 100)	43
Ireland (IRMA)	50
Norway (VG-lista)	6
Poland Airplay (Polish Airplay Charts)	11
Romania (Romanian Top 100)	19
Scottish Singles Sales (Official Charts)	9
Sweden (Sverigetopplistan)	55
UK Singles (Official Charts)	11
UK Airplay (Music Week)	32

=== Year-end charts ===
Chart (2002)	Position
Norway (VG-lista Skoleslutt Period)	13
