= Kristin Husøy =

Norwegian singer

- Born: 2 April 2001 (age 25); Trondheim, Norway
- Genres: Pop; Soul; Jazz; R&B; Gospel
- Occupation: Singer
- Instrument: Piano
- Years active: 2019–present

Kristin Husøy (born 2 April 2001) is a Norwegian singer. She was the runner-up of Melodi Grand Prix 2020, the Norwegian preselection for the Eurovision Song Contest 2020.

== Career ==
=== 2019: The Voice Norway ===
In 2019, Husøy was a contestant in the fifth season of The Voice – Norges beste stemme, broadcast by TV 2. She joined Team Yosef after her blind audition, and was eliminated in the first live show.

The Voice Norway performances and results
Round	Song	Original artist	Result
Blind Audition	"Killing Me Softly with His Song"	Roberta Flack	Joined Team Yosef
The Battles	"Crazy"	Gnarls Barkley	Winner
The Knockouts	"Tears Dry on Their Own"	Amy Winehouse	Advanced
Live Show 1	"It's a Man's Man's Man's World"	James Brown	Eliminated

=== 2020: Melodi Grand Prix ===
In 2020, Husøy was selected by the Norwegian broadcaster NRK to participate in Melodi Grand Prix, the national preselection for the Eurovision Song Contest. She competed in the third heat (Central Norway) on 25 January 2020 with the song "Pray For Me", and qualified for the final which took place on 29 February 2020 in her hometown Trondheim. The song was written by the Dutch Songwriters Galeyn Tenhaeff, Marcia Sondeijker, Roel Rats and Neil Hollyn, and was recorded in the Netherlands. In the final, she advanced to the gold final and subsequently the gold duel, but ultimately lost to Ulrikke Brandstorp, winning second place in the competition.

== Discography ==
=== Singles ===
==== As lead artist ====
Title	Year	Peak chart positions	Album or EP
Title	Year	NOR	Album or EP
"Pray for Me"	2020	38	Non-album singles
"Love on the Brain"	2021	—	Non-album singles
"—" denotes a recording that did not chart or was not released in that territory.

==== As featured artist ====
Title	Year	Album or EP
"Self Love" (Gerald Ofori featuring 451 Kristin Husøy)	2019	Ultraviolet
"Another Year" (Agnes featuring Kristin Husøy)	2019	Non-album singles
"Shattered Hearts" (Hey Andy featuring Kristin Husøy)	2022	Non-album singles

=== Promotional singles ===
Title	Year	Album or EP
"Killing Me Softly"	2019	The Voice – Norges beste stemme (Season 5)
"Tears Dry on Their Own"	2019	The Voice – Norges beste stemme (Season 5)
"Crazy" (with Ida Ganes)	2019	The Voice – Norges beste stemme (Season 5)
"It's a Man's Man's Man's World"	2019	The Voice – Norges beste stemme (Season 5)
