= Kobojsarna =

Swedish musical group

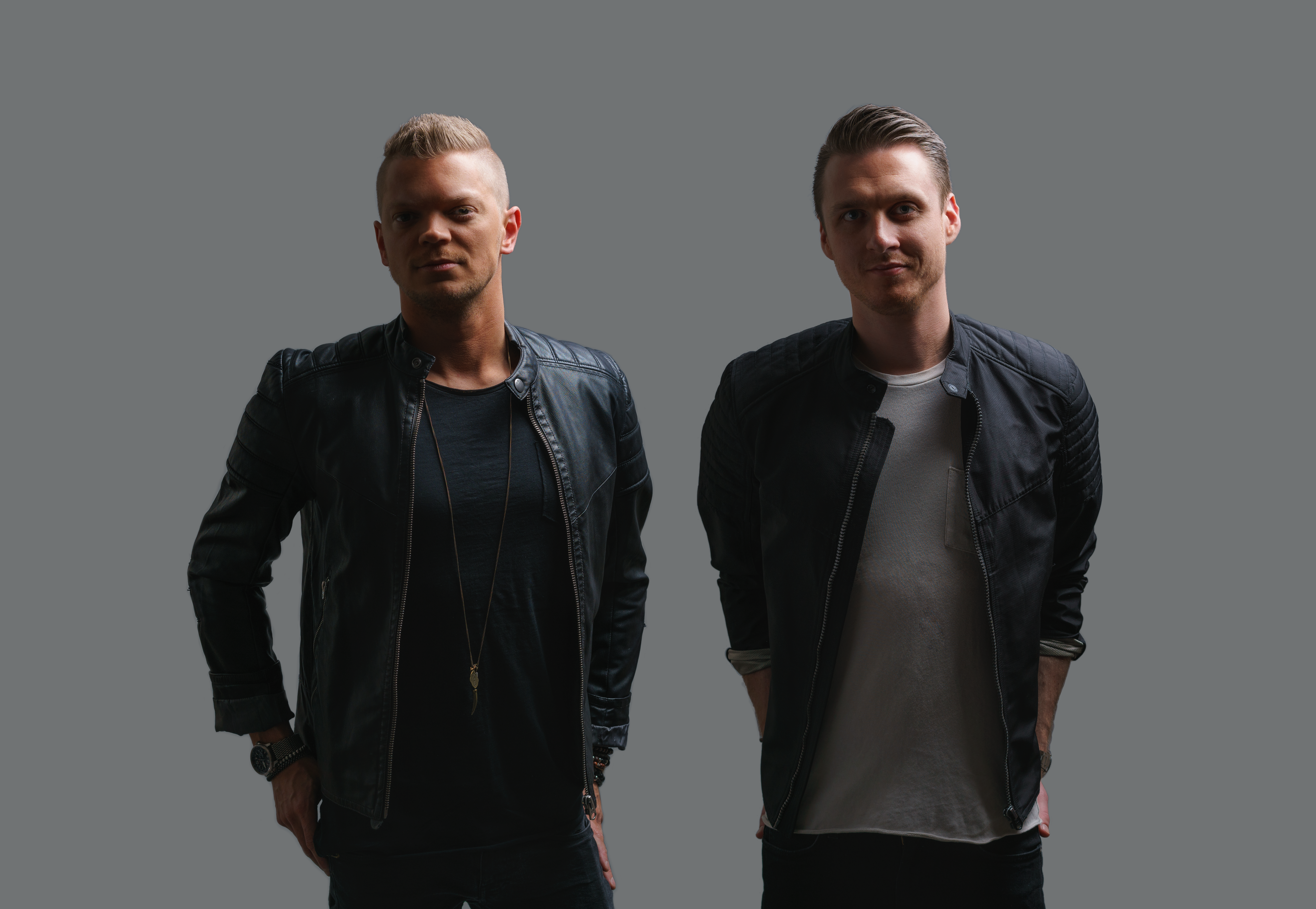
- Kobojsarna in 2017. Current members Emil Carlin (left) and Mikael Collin (formerly Danielsson) (right).

Background information
- Origin: Malmö, Sweden
- Genres: Eurodance; Electronic dance music; Electro; Pop
- Instruments: Ableton Live; Logic Studio; Propellerheads Reason
- Years active: 2003–present
- Labels: Jacaranda Studios AB; Warner Chappell Music
- Members: Mikael Collin; Emil Carlin
- Past members: Richard Mellberg
- Website: kobojsarna.se

Kobojsarna is a Swedish musical group from Malmö, formed in 2003, although the group began performing seriously in 2006. Until 2010, the group consisted of three men born in 1986: Mikael Collin (formerly Danielsson), Emil Carlin and Richard Mellberg (formerly Pettersson). Mellberg left the group in 2010. The group has released three physical singles. Their first single, Sång om ingenting, was released in 2006 and became a hit in Sweden. Jag Vet Att Du Vill Ha Mig was subsequently released and became a hit in Norway, where it won the Norwegian Russ Song of the Year. They have been signed to Warner Music Sweden.

During their career, Kobojsarna have produced two music videos, including Jag vet att du vill ha mig, which was produced by the group themselves. They have also made a remix of Markoolio's Emma, Emma and have been remixed by artists including Richi M and Ali Payami. Richi M also mixed Sång om Ingenting.

Kobojsarna is the only group to have won the Norwegian Russ "Song of the Year" twice and in two consecutive years. They won in 2007 with Sång Om Ingenting and again in 2008 with Jag Vet Du Vill Ha Mig. In 2011, they came in second place with La Perla.

The group produces its music at Northlane Studio in Malmö using Ableton Live, having previously worked with Propellerheads Reason.

Kobojsarna's song Studentsången is one of Sweden's most played student songs during the graduation period.

Kobojsarna have had an average of 175,000 monthly listeners on Spotify, with more than 71 million total streams on the service.

== Musical career ==
In 2006, before Facebook and Spotify, Kobojsarna created Sång om Ingenting and uploaded the song to their own website without expecting it to ever be played on radio. In less than two weeks, the track had been downloaded more than 35,000 times. Record companies subsequently began contacting the group, and shortly afterwards the song was released through Warner Chappell Music.

Sång om ingenting was released in late 2006 and reached number 22 on the Swedish singles chart. It also reached number one on Swedish radio station NRJ and remained on its Top 7 list for more than eight weeks. The song spent a total of 13 weeks on the Swedish singles chart. Kobojsarna's first television performance was on Sveriges Television in the programme Bobster.

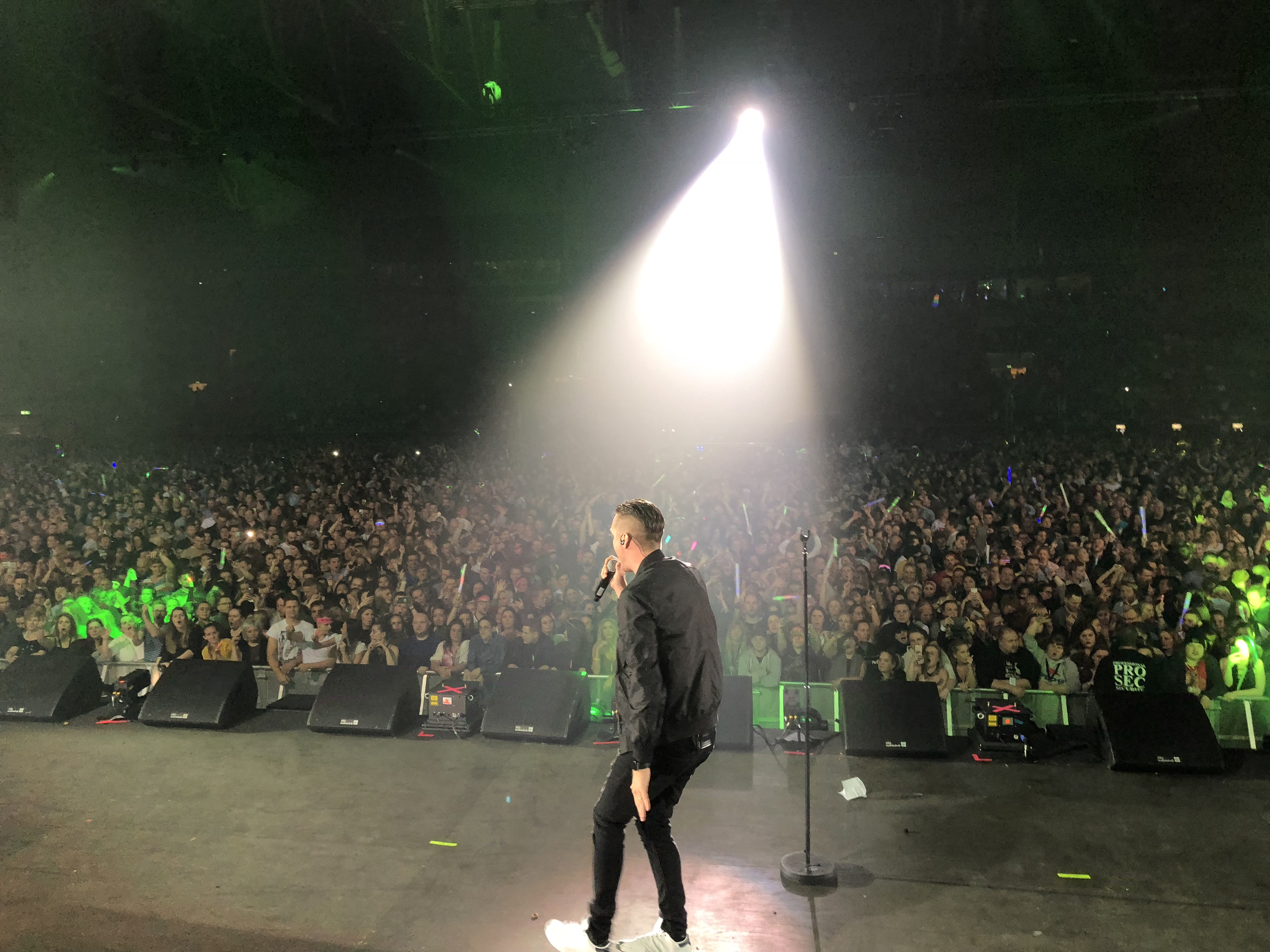
Kobojsarna performing at We Love The 2000s at Telenor Arena, Oslo, in 2018

In 2007, Kobojsarna won the Norwegian Russ "Song of the Year" with Sång om Ingenting. The previous year, the only other Swedish artist to have won was Basshunter, who won in 2006 with Boten Anna. In 2008, Kobojsarna won again, becoming the first group to win twice as well as the first group to win in two consecutive years. In 2011, they came in second place with La Perla.

On 22 June 2007, Kobojsarna performed at the VG-lista Topp 20 concert at Rådhusplassen in Oslo. The line-up also included Melanie C, Natasha Bedingfield, The Ark, Darude, Karpe and Susanne Sundfør.

=== Later career ===
Kobojsarna have continued to perform following their original breakthrough and have appeared on several occasions at the We Love The 2000s and We Love The 90s & 2000s nostalgia festivals.

On 17 November 2018, the group performed at We Love The 2000s at Telenor Arena in Fornebu outside Oslo. The event featured 25 acts, including Wyclef Jean, Nelly, Sean Kingston, Basshunter, ItaloBrothers, Kate Ryan, Da Buzz, Günther and Kobojsarna.

In August 2022, Kobojsarna appeared at two Swedish editions of We Love The 2000s. They performed at Skansen in Stockholm on 5 August and on the Main Stage at Liseberg in Gothenburg on 6 August. The Liseberg event also featured Wyclef Jean, Bomfunk MC's, DJ Sammy, Lasgo, Kate Ryan, Günther, Fragma and Kobojsarna.

During the summer of 2024, Kobojsarna participated in the Norwegian We Love The 90s & 2000s tour. The group performed at seven stops: Kristiansand on 20 July, Stavanger on 9 August, Bergen on 10 August, Tromsø on 16 August, Fredrikstad on 17 August, Oslo on 23 August and Trondheim on 24 August. Other artists appearing on the tour included Vengaboys, Hanson, Cascada, Atomic Kitten, Kate Ryan, Sash!, DJ Sammy, Rednex and Da Buzz. Kobojsarna's performance at Odderøya Amfi in Kristiansand was also documented by Norwegian music media.

In autumn 2025, Kobojsarna toured Norway together with German Eurodance group ItaloBrothers. The tour comprised ten stops: Haugesund, Stavanger, Ålesund, Volda, Bodø, Mo i Rana, Fredrikstad, Sørskogbygda, Bø in Telemark and Sogndal. The tour began at Byscenen in Haugesund on 26 September and concluded at Meieriet in Sogndal on 25 October 2025. Studenthuset Rokken in Volda described the tour as a joint Norwegian tour in which Kobojsarna appeared as special guest to ItaloBrothers.

=== Music-historical significance ===
Kobojsarna, together with Basshunter, have been highlighted as part of the early development of Norwegian party music during the 2000s. Store norske leksikon describes the two Swedish-language Eurodance acts as important to the development of Norwegian party music and as particularly popular among Norwegian russ.

Norwegian party music later developed further through, among other forms, russemusikk, which became established as a distinct electronic party-music genre during the 2010s. Store norske leksikon also describes the Swedish epadunk genre, which achieved its breakthrough during the 2020s, as musically similar to Norwegian party music.

Kobojsarna have also been mentioned in accounts of the musical background of epadunk. In a historical overview of the genre, Swedish newspaper Aftonbladet describes how so-called "dunk" existed long before the term epadunk became established, and names Kobojsarna among the acts booked within this music scene around 2010, alongside Norwegian russ acts such as Kuselofte, Broiler and TIX. The same overview describes Norwegian russ music as one of the most important predecessors of Swedish epadunk.

From a music-historical perspective, the Swedish Eurodance and "dunk" scene represented by Kobojsarna and Basshunter during the 2000s has thus come to be regarded as part of the musical development that preceded both modern Norwegian russemusikk and the later Swedish epadunk.

== Members ==
=== Current members ===
- Mikael Collin (Mikael Jonas Collin), born April 10, 1986 (age 40), has been a member of Kobojsarna since the group's formation. He currently resides in Klågerup in Svedala Municipality and is married to Nathalie Collin (born 1987). Prior to his marriage, his surname was Danielsson.
- Emil Carlin (Emil Alexander Carlin), born October 17, 1986 (age 39), has, like Mikael Collin, been a member of Kobojsarna since the group's formation. He currently resides in Höllviken in Vellinge Municipality, where he lives with his partner Linda Malmgren (born 1985).

=== Former member ===
- Richard Mellberg (Mats Richard Mellberg), born December 5, 1986 (age 39), was a member of Kobojsarna from the group's formation until leaving in 2010. He currently resides in Löddeköpinge in Kävlinge Municipality and works as a store manager at Derome's building-materials and hardware store in Lund. His surname was previously Pettersson, but following his marriage to Viveca Mellberg (born 1987) he changed his surname to Mellberg.

== Discography ==
=== Singles ===
Release date	Title	Album
December 2006	Sång om ingenting	-
May 2007	Studentsången	-
November 2007	Jag Vet Att Du Vill Ha Mig	-
March 2008	Bambi	-
March 2009	Another One	-
March 2009	Unbelievable	-
February 2010	Burn It To The Ground	-
February 2010	La Perla	-
March 2011	Timeless	-
July 2012	Vadodora	-
April 2015	Patriots	-
August 2023	Gör Skåne Danskt Igen	

=== Albums ===
Bambi 2011
Bambi 2011
Bambi 2011 (Chris Delay & Junior Remix - Radio Edit)
Bambi 2011 (Chris Delay & Junior Remix - Extended Edit)
Bambi 2011 (Toby & Pino Remix)
Bambi 2011 (Mabiro Remix)
