= Ève Angeli =

French pop singer

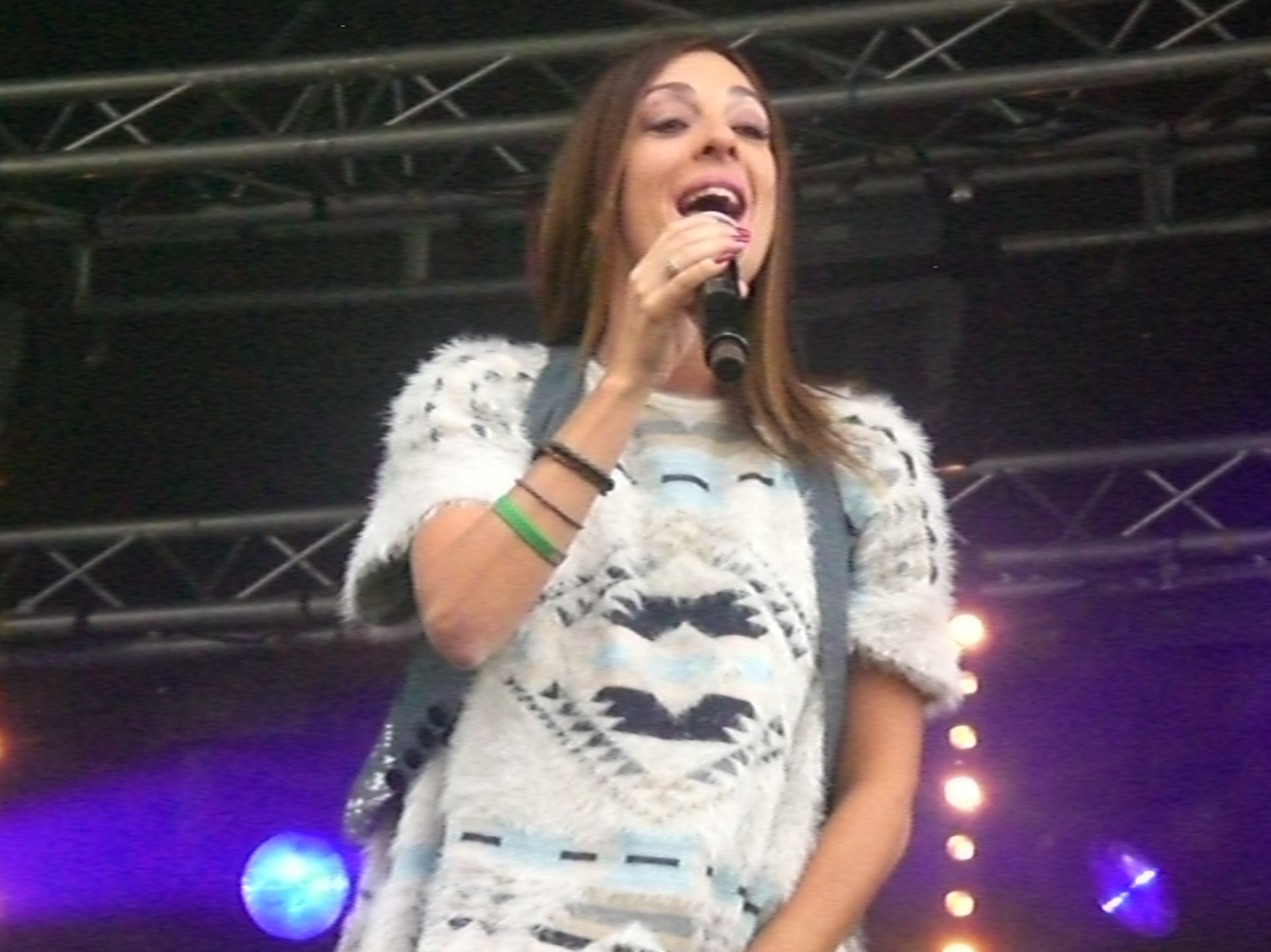
- Angeli performing in 2015
- Born: Vanessa Annelyse Ève Garcin; 25 August 1980 (age 45); Sète, Hérault, Occitanie, France
- Occupation: Singer

Vanessa Annelyse Ève Garcin (born 25 August 1980 in Sète, Hérault, France), better known by her stage name Ève Angeli, is a French pop singer, who won an NRJ Music Award for Best New French Artist in 2000–2002.

== Biography ==
She began her rise to fame on the television show Graines de star in 1999. Her star-making performance on the show led to a major-label recording contract with Sony Music and the eventual release of her debut single, "Avant de partir" in 2000. The lead single from her forthcoming full-length album debut, "Aime-Moi" (2002), "Avant de Partir" was a Top Five hit on the French singles chart. The follow-up single "Elle" was also a major hit, breaking into the Top Ten, and though successive singles "Je Sais" and "C'est Pour Ça" were less popular, the run of hit singles helped carry Aime-Moi to number 11 on the French albums chart. In 2002, Angeli won the NRJ Music Award for Best New French Artist and released her second album, "Nos Différences", which spawned a modest hit with its title track, a bilingual collaboration with the British boy band A1. Relative to her debut album, however, "Nos Différences" was a disappointment, and Angeli subsequently receded from the spotlight for a couple of years. She re-emerged in 2004 with the reality TV show La Ferme Célébrités, a greatest-hits compilation "Le Meilleur d'Eve Angeli", and the new single "Une Chanson dans le Coeur," her biggest hit in years. Her third album, "Viens" (2005), followed, and while it spawned a couple modest hits with "Viens" and "Je Vais T'aimer," it continued to mark a downturn in Angeli's commercial success and concluded her association with Sony.

In subsequent years, Angeli published a book, Mes Evangélismes: Pensées d'une Blonde (2007), and released her first independent album, "Revolution" (2008).

== Discography ==
=== Albums ===
Year	Album	Chart		
Year	Album	France	Belgium (Wa)	Switzerland
2001	Aime-moi	11	26	39
2002	Nos différences	40	—	—
2004	Le Meilleur d'Ève Angeli	20	—	—
2005	Viens	49	—	—
2008	Revolution	—	—	—
2015	Etre Libre	—	—	—
2018	Que l'amour	—	—	
2022	Je seme	—	—	—

=== Singles ===
Year	Single	Chart			Album
Year	Single	France	Belgium (Wa)	Switzerland	Album
2000	"Avant de partir"	4	2	20	Aime-moi
2001	"Elle"	6	37	—	Aime-moi
2001	"Je sais"	30	—	—	Aime-moi
2002	"C'est pour ça"	72	—	—	Aime-moi
2002	"Nos différences – Caught in the Middle" (& A1)	15	—	32	Nos différences
2003	"Ma prière"	58	—	—	Nos différences
2003	"L'amour que j'ai pour toi"	58	—	—	Nos différences
2003	"Love On The Dancefloor" feat Cerrone	—	—		
2004	"Une chanson dans le cœur (Felicità)"	11	8	59	Le meilleur d'Ève Angeli
2005	"Viens"	20	—	73	Viens
2006	"Je vais t'aimer"	57	—	—	Viens
2006	"La Solitudine"	—	—	—	Viens
2007	"Na na naa, le zapping"	—	—	—	Revolution
2008	"Look Away"	—	—	—	Revolution
2008	"Si tu m'oublies"	—	—	–	Revolution
2011	"Avant de partir (Remix)"	—	—	–	
2012	"Une autre histoire"	—	—	–	
2013	"Ta Différence"	—	—	–	Être Libre
2014	"Une histoire inachevée"	—	—	–	Être Libre
2014	"You Raise Me Up (feat Adrien Abelli) "	—	—	–	Être Libre
2014	"Tourner La Page"	—	—	–	Être Libre
2018	"T'es chiante "	—	—	–	Le Binôme du Siècle
2020	"Fragile"	—	—	–	Je Sème
2022	"Je sème "	—	—	–	Je Sème

== See also ==
- NRJ Music Awards
- Artist's blog
