= Avant de partir =

2000 single by Ève Angeli

Single by Ève Angeli

from the album Aime-moi
- B-side: "Remix, instrumental"
- Released: 8 September 2000
- Recorded: 2000
- Genre: Synthpop
- Length: 3:37
- Label: Sony
- Songwriters: Michel Rostaing, Ėve Angeli
- Producer: Yvan Tarley

Ève Angeli singles chronology
"Avant de partir" (2000)	"Elle" (2001)

"Avant de partir" is a song recorded by French singer Ève Angeli. Written by Angeli's then fiancé, now husband, Michel Rostaing, it was her debut single from her album Aime-moi (2001), and was released on 8 September 2000. It became the singer's most successful single in terms of peak positions on the charts, hitting success. In France, the single debuted at number 59 on the chart edition of 16 September 2000 and climbed regularly until reaching a peak of number four for three consecutive weeks. It remained for 15 weeks in the top ten and fell out of the top 100 after 33 weeks. On 16 May 2001, it earned a Platinum disc for selling over 500,000 units. In Belgium (Wallonia), it entered the Ultratop 50 on 30 December 2000 at number 40 and reached number two in its eighth week, being unable to dislodge Garou's hit single "Seul" which topped the chart then. The single totaled ten weeks in the top ten and 17 weeks in the top 40. In Switzerland, entered at a peak of number 20 on 21 January 2001, then dropped and remained for six weeks in the top 100.

The song was included in Angeli's best of Le Meilleur d'Eve Angeli, released on 8 November 2004.

In 2011, Angeli released an electro remix of the song, made in Los Angeles by the DJ who remixed some of Rihanna and Britney Spears' songs. It was accompanied by a sexy music video.

== Track listings ==
CD single

1. "Avant de partir" (radio edit) — 3:37
2. "Avant de partir" (pitch mix) — 3:53
3. "Avant de partir" (instrumental) — 3:37

== Charts ==
=== Weekly charts ===
Chart (2000/01)	Peak position
France (SNEP)	4
Belgium (Ultratop 50 Wallonia)	2
Switzerland (Schweizer Hitparade)	20

=== Year-end charts ===
Chart (2000)	Position
France (SNEP)	23

Chart (2001)	Position
Belgium (Ultratop 50 Wallonia)	23
France (SNEP)	60

== Certifications and sales ==
Region	Certification	Certified units/sales
France (SNEP)	Platinum	500,000^{*}
^{*} Sales figures based on certification alone.
