= Nos Differences =

Single by A1 and Ève Angeli

from the album Nos Différences & Make It Good
- B-side: "Caught in the Middle" (original version)
- Released: September 2002
- Recorded: 2001
- Genre: Pop rock
- Length: 3:28
- Label: Columbia, Sony
- Songwriters: Ben Adams, Paul Marazzi, Rick Mitra, Chris Porter, Michel Rostaing
- Producer: Mike Hedges

A1 singles chronology
| "Make It Good" (2002) | "Nos Differences" (2002) | "Take You Home" (2009) |

"Nos Differences" (English: "Our Differences") is a song by British-Norwegian boy band A1, released as the third single from their third studio album, Make It Good (2002). The song is a French version of the band's song "Caught in the Middle", and features vocals from French pop singer Ève Angeli.

It was A1's last single to feature Paul Marazzi as a member of the band. The music video was the last to be released before their 2002 split. The video features both A1 and Angeli in a mansion in France, performing the song together.

It was revealed over ten years later on the program The Big Reunion that the release of the song precipitated Marazzi's departure from the band as co-vocalist Eve Angeli requested to sing the opening of song, effectively removing his original vocals from the track.

== Music video ==
The music video was the last to be released before their 2002 split. The video features both A1 and Angeli in a mansion in France, performing the song together.

== Track listing ==
1. "Nos Differences" - 3:28
2. "Caught in the Middle" - 3:28
3. "Avant De Partir" - 3:11

== Charts ==
| Chart (2002) | Peak position |
|---|---|
| Europe (Eurochart Hot 100) | 50 |
| France (SNEP) | 15 |
| Switzerland (Schweizer Hitparade) | 32 |
