= Waiting for Daylight (A1 album) =

Studio album by A1
- Released: 11 October 2010
- Recorded: 2009–2010
- Genre: Pop
- Length: 40:02
- Label: Universal Norway
- Producer: Ben Adams, Christian Ingebrigtsen, Mark Read

A1 chronology
Greatest Hits (2009)	Waiting for Daylight (2010)	Rediscovered (2012)

Singles from Waiting for Daylight
- 1. "Take You Home" Released: 2 November 2009; 2. "Don't Wanna Lose You Again" Released: 23 January 2010; 3. "In Love and I Hate It" Released: 4 August 2010; 4. "Waiting for Daylight" Released: 22 April 2011; 5. "Another Year Gone" Released: 18 November 2011

Waiting for Daylight is the fourth studio album by British–Norwegian boy band, A1. The album was released on 11 October 2010, and was the band's first release of new material for more than eight years. It is also the first album to be released since the departure of Paul Marazzi from the band. It was originally released in Norway only, but was released on iTunes in 2015 for the UK and the rest of the world. The album peaked at number five on the Norwegian Albums Chart.

== Background ==
In November 2008, the remaining members of the band formed a MySpace account to keep fans updated of their current situation. In Summer 2009, the band made an official announcement, stating that not only were they to reform, but they were to play a series of concerts in Oslo in December of that year. The announcement also stated that the band's first new single in seven years, "Take You Home", would be released via the iTunes Store in Norway on 2 November 2009, and would also serve as the official Comic Relief single in the region for that year. The single entered the Norwegian Singles Chart at No. 9 on the week of release, based entirely on download sales, with a physical release being limited to the Plankompteplanet online store. It was announced in December 2009 that the band would compete to represent Norway in the 2010 Eurovision Song Contest, with the band's second single since their reformation, "Don't Wanna Lose You Again", being the track being chosen to enter. Although the band reached the national final of the contest, and finished in second place, the single was a commercial success, peaking at No. 4 on the Norwegian Singles Chart.

The band then made their official comeback in the United Kingdom on New Year's Eve by performing at the Heaven New Year's Eve Party in London. In March 2010, the band embarked on a worldwide tour, that began in Norway, with performances in Oslo, Stavanger, Kristiansand, Bergen, Trondheim and Haugesund. The tour extended to Europe, and ROTW in Autumn 2010. The band used the tour to promote their brand new single, "In Love and I Hate It", which was eventually released on 4 August 2010. It was also successful on the Norwegian Singles Chart, peaking at No. 7 and staying in the top ten for two weeks running. Just one hundred copies of the physical single were produced, and given away for free through the band's official Facebook page. The album, Waiting for Daylight, was finally released on 11 October 2010. The album debuted at No. 7 on the Norwegian Albums Chart based solely on pre-order sales, and peaked at No. 5 during the week of release. At first, the album was only made available in Norway. This was shortly followed by the release of the title track as a single, "Waiting for Daylight", with the band filming their first music video in eight years especially for the track.

In October 2011, the group appeared on Channel 5's OK TV to promote their British comeback gig at the O2 Academy Islington on 31 October 2011. The gig received positive reviews from sites such as This Must Be Pop and Time Out. On 18 November 2011, the band released a single via the iTunes Store, titled "Another Year Gone". Despite being a seasonal winter-themed track, it performed well, again reaching the top 10 in Norway. On 28 February 2012, the group performed at the Singapore Indoor Stadium with Blue and Jeff Timmons from 98 Degrees. The concert was entitled "The Greatest Hits Tour: Blue, Jeff Timmons of 98 Degrees and a1 – Live in Singapore." They also visited Jakarta, Indonesia and Manila, Philippines as part of the concert tour. The tour prompted a re-issue of the album in the Philippines and select areas of Europe, with three additional tracks being included on the album, these being acoustic versions of the band's classic hits, "Like a Rose", "Everytime" and "Caught in the Middle". The album was re-issued on 12 February 2012. In areas such as South Korea and Japan, "Another Year Gone" was also added to the album.

== Track listing ==
Waiting for Daylight track listing
No.	Title	Writer(s)	Producer(s)	Length
1.	"It Happens Everyday"	Ben Adams, Christian Ingebrigtsen, Mark Read	David Eriksen	4:06
2.	"Don't Wanna Lose You Again"	Adams, Ingebrigtsen, Read, David Eriksen	David Eriksen	3:28
3.	"In Love and I Hate It"	Adams, Ingebrigtsen, Read, Sjølie, Ochs	Martin Sjølie, Micheal Hunter Ochs	3:36
4.	"Bad Enough"	Adams, Ingebrigtsen, Read, Simen Eriksrud	Simen Eriksrud	4:10
5.	"Nothing in Common"	Adams, Ingebrigtsen, Read, Eriksen	David Eriksen	3:12
6.	"Take You Home"	Adams, Ingebrigtsen, Read, Hans Petter Aaserud	Hans Petter Aaserud	3:26
7.	"Six Feet Under"	Adams, Ingebrigtsen, Read, Eriksrud	Simen Eriksrud	2:45
8.	"Good Things, Bad People"	Adams, Ingebrigtsen, Read, Eriksen	David Eriksen	3:33
9.	"Perfect Disaster"	Adams, Ingebrigtsen, Read, Arvid Wam Solvang	Arvid Wam Solvang	3:43
10.	"The Life That Could Have Been"	Adams, Ingebrigtsen, Read, Morten Noess	Morten Noess	3:34
11.	"Out There"	Adams, Ingebrigtsen, Read, Sjølie	Martin Sjølie	3:40
12.	"Waiting for Daylight"	Adams, Ingebrigtsen, Read, Jez Ashurst	Jez Ashurst	5:20
Total length:				44:33

Philippines anniversary tour edition bonus tracks
No.	Title	Writer(s)	Producer(s)	Length
13.	"Everytime" (acoustic)	Adams, Ingebrigtsen, Read	David Eriksen	4:30
14.	"Like a Rose" (acoustic)	Adams	David Eriksen	4:02
15.	"Caught in the Middle" (acoustic)	Adams, Marazzi, Mitra, Porter	David Eriksen	3:29
16.	"Another Year Gone"	Adams, Ingebrigtsen, Read, Jez Ashurst	Jez Ashurst	3:50

== Charts ==
Chart performance for Waiting for Daylight
Chart (2010)	Peak position
Norwegian Albums (VG-lista)	5
