= Fallen Angel (Tix song) =

2021 song by TIX

Single by Tix

from the album Enten går det bra, ellers går det over
- Released: 15 January 2021
- Length: 2:53
- Label: Universal Music
- Composer: Andreas Haukeland
- Lyricists: Andreas Haukeland; Emelie Hollow; Mathias Haukeland
- Producer: Andreas Haukeland

Tix singles chronology
"Tusen tårer" (2020)	"Fallen Angel" (2021)	"Engel, Ikke Dra" (2021)

Music video
- "Fallen Angel" on YouTube

Eurovision Song Contest 2021 entry
- Country: Norway
- Artist: Tix
- Composer: Andreas Haukeland
- Lyricists: Andreas Haukeland; Emelie Hollow; Mathias Haukeland

Finals performance
- Semi-final result: 10th
- Semi-final points: 115
- Final result: 18th
- Final points: 75

Entry chronology
- ◄ "Attention" (2020)
- "Give That Wolf a Banana" (2022) ►

"Fallen Angel" is a song by Norwegian singer Tix. He represented Norway in the Eurovision Song Contest in Rotterdam and progressed to the grand final. The song is an English translation of the song "Ut av mørket" ("Out of the darkness"), which he performed on the first semi-final of Melodi Grand Prix 2021, and was released on 15 January 2021. The song peaked at number 2 on the VG-lista chart. On 20 February 2021, Tix performed the song under the English title "Fallen Angel" and won the final of Melodi Grand Prix 2021. "Fallen Angel" was released the same day.

== Background ==
The song is about struggling with depression, that is made even worse by being rejected by a girl for whom Tix had feelings. Tix compares depression to "fighting with demons inside a hole in my heart" in the song.

== Eurovision Song Contest ==
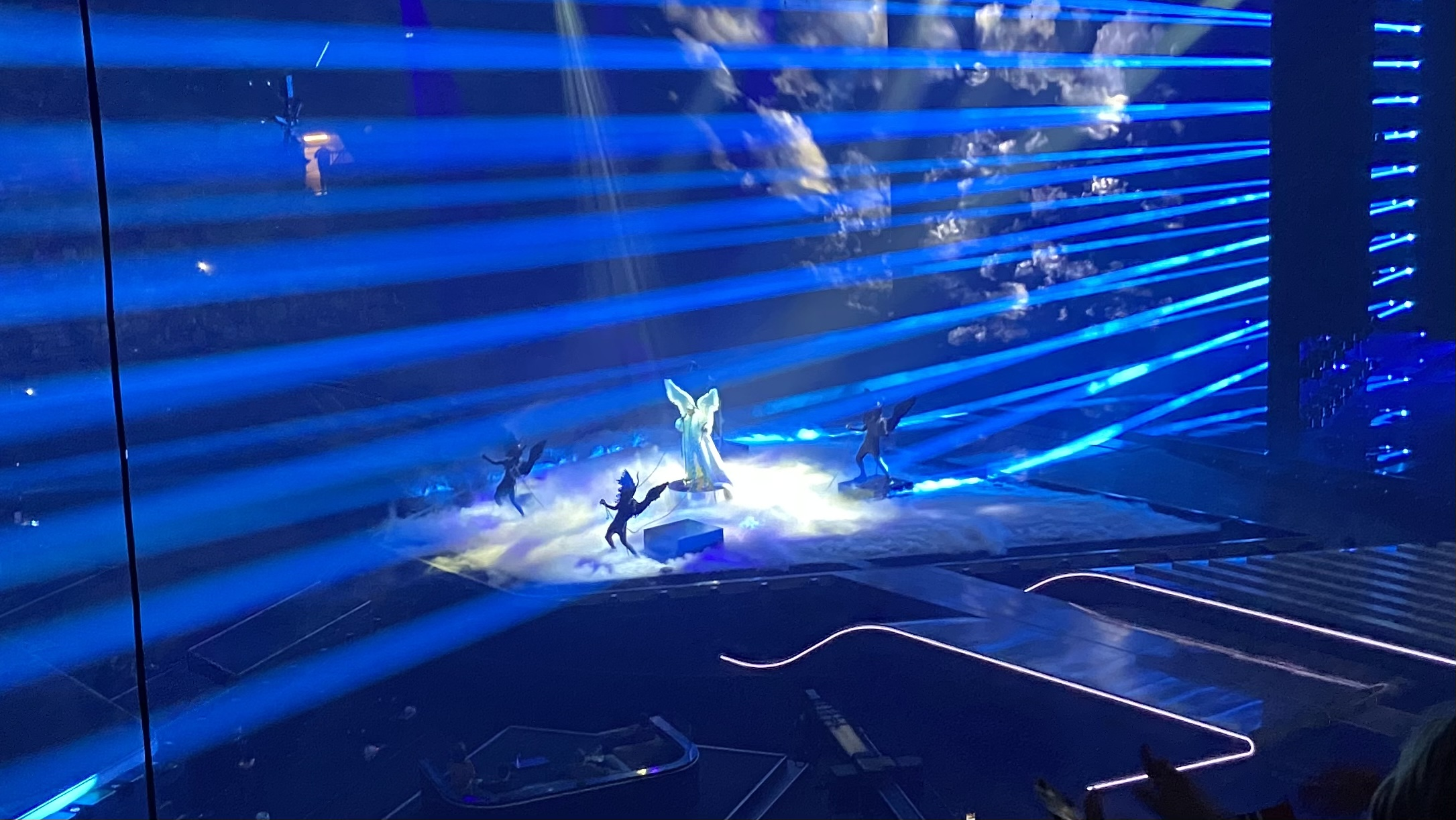
TIX performing Fallen Angel at Eurovision 2021.

The song was selected to represent Norway in the Eurovision Song Contest 2021, after Tix was selected through Melodi Grand Prix 2021, the music competition that selects Norway's entries for the Eurovision Song Contest. The semi-finals of the 2021 contest featured the same line-up of countries as determined by the draw for the 2020 contest's semi-finals. Norway was placed into the first semi-final, which was held on 18 May 2021, and performed in the second half of the show.

== Track listing ==
Digital download/ streaming
No.	Title	Length
1.	"Ut av mørket"	2:53

Digital download/ streaming
No.	Title	Length
1.	"Fallen Angel"	2:53

== Charts ==
=== Weekly charts ===
As "Ut av mørket"
Chart (2021)	Peak position
Norway (VG-lista)	1

As "Fallen Angel"
Chart (2021)	Peak position
Belgium (Ultratip Bubbling Under Flanders)	18
Greece (IFPI)	92
Finland (Suomen virallinen lista)	20
Iceland (Tónlistinn)	31
Lithuania (AGATA)	23
Netherlands (Single Top 100)	65
Norway (VG-lista)	2
Sweden (Sverigetopplistan)	41
UK Singles Downloads (Official Charts)	15

=== Year-end charts ===
As "Ut av mørket"
Chart (2021)	Position
Norway (VG-lista)	28
