= Emil Solli-Tangen =

Norwegian opera singer (born 1990)

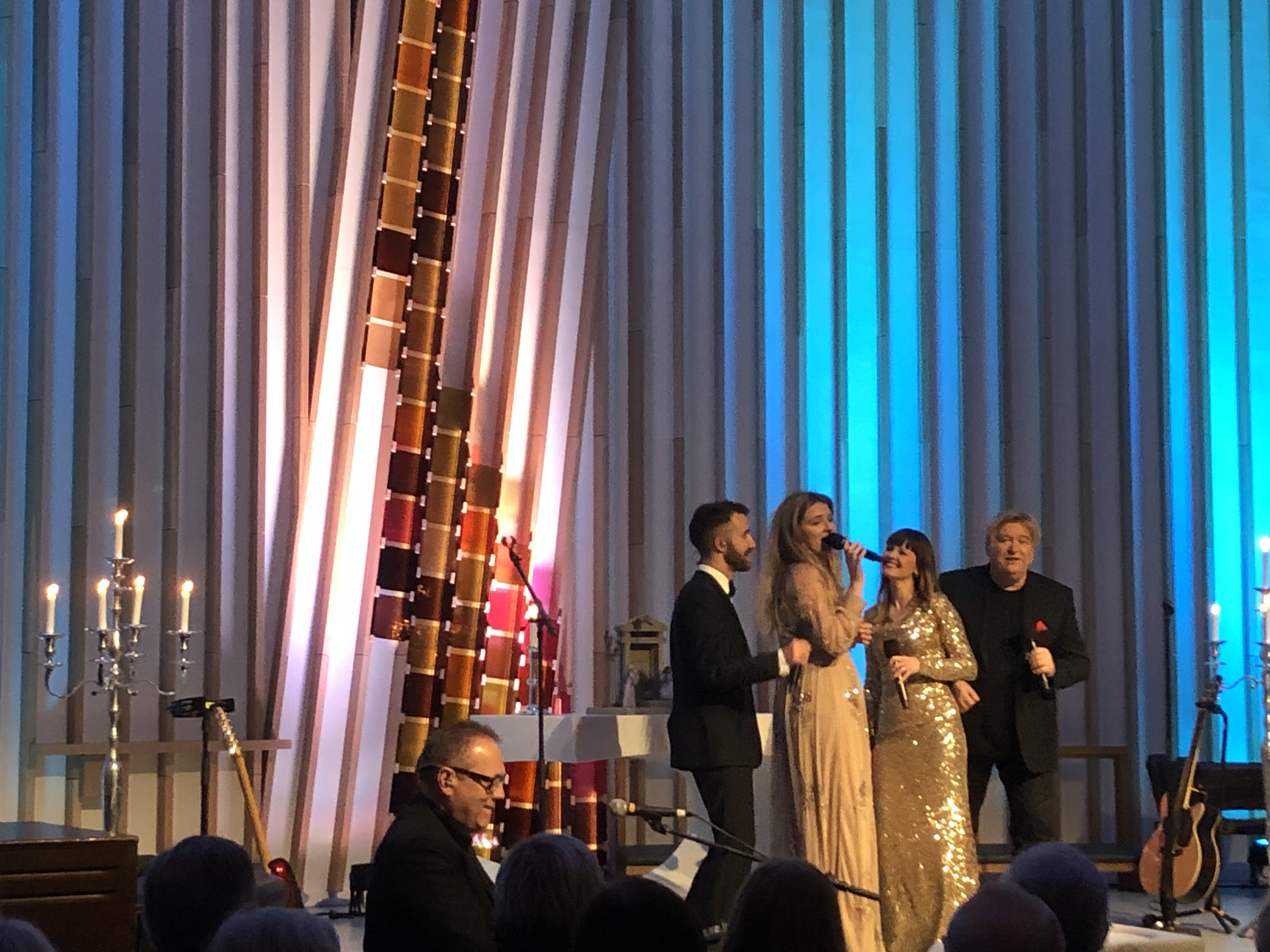
- Concert in Hønefoss church, December 2019, with Trond Lien, Emil Solli-Tangen, Lise Mæland, Lisa Stokke and Jørn Hoel.

Background information
- Born: 26 February 1990 (age 35); Porsgrunn, Telemark, Norway
- Origin: Porsgrunn, Telemark, Norway
- Genres: Opera
- Years active: 2012–present

Emil Solli-Tangen (born 26 February 1990) is a Norwegian opera singer.

Hailing from Porsgrunn, he is a younger brother of Didrik Solli-Tangen. He studied at the Operahøgskolen in Oslo.

He participated with the band Gromth in the Norwegian national selection Melodi Grand Prix 2013 for Eurovision 2013. He also participated in duo with his brother Didrik in the Melodi Grand Prix 2020 with the song Out of air, being prequalified to the final from the second semifinal. They didn't qualify for the superfinal.
