= Christian Ingebrigtsen =

Norwegian singer-songwriter and musician (born 1977)

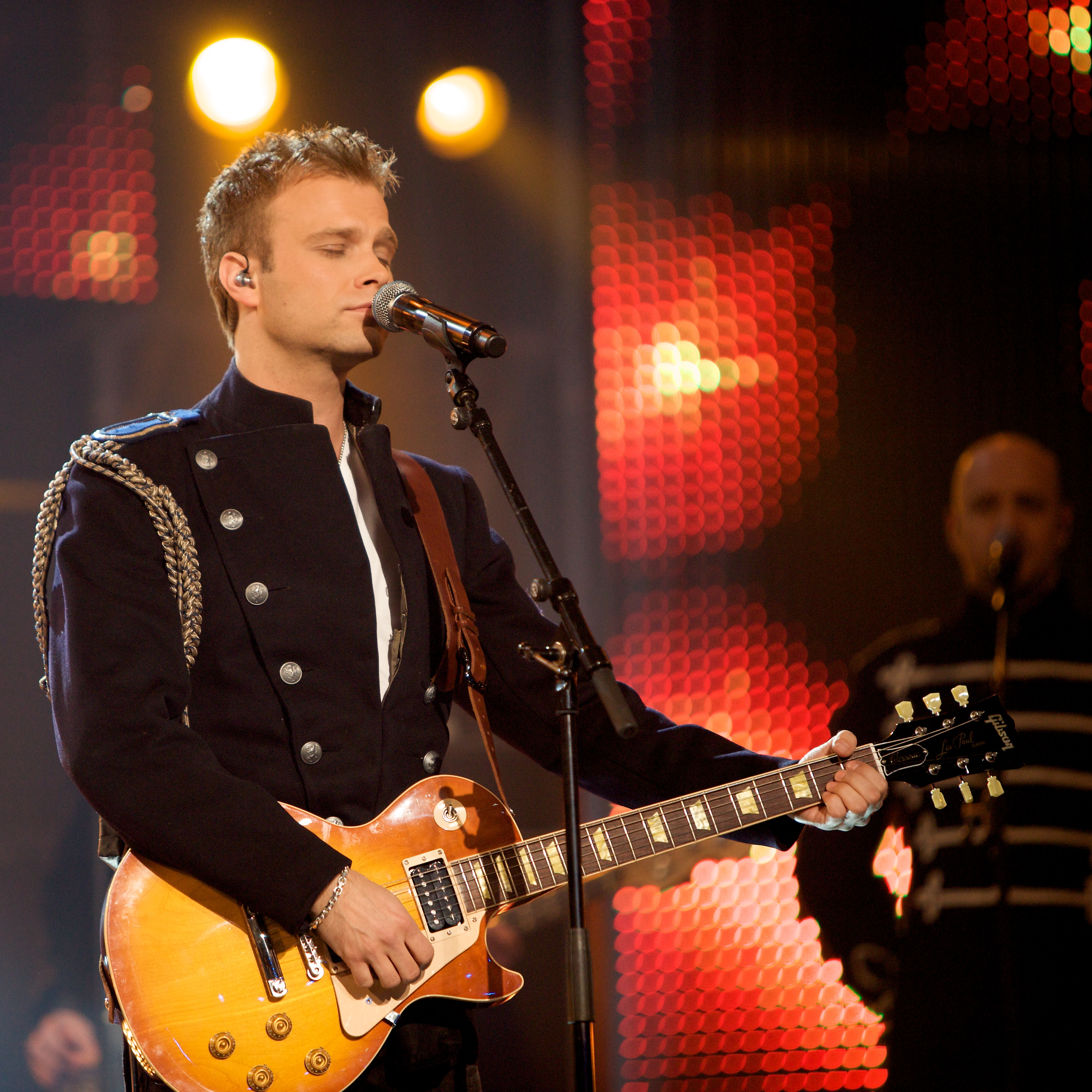

Background information
- Born: Christian Ingebrigtsen; 25 January 1977 (age 49)
- Origin: Oslo, Norway
- Genres: Pop
- Occupations: Singer, songwriter, producer
- Instruments: Vocals, guitar, bass, piano, keyboards
- Years active: 1998–present
- Website: Christian Ingebrigtsen's official website

Christian Ingebrigtsen (born 25 January 1977) is a Norwegian singer-songwriter and musician. He is a member of the pop group A1.

== Biography ==
Ingebrigtsen was born in Oslo, Norway, into a musical family. His father Stein Ingebrigtsen was the biggest-selling recording artist in Norway in the 1970s. At the age of three, Christian joined his father on tour. He learned to play the violin at six, and later started playing the piano and guitar. At school he concentrated on music and drama, and eventually played the piano at local events and at church. At 16, he started composing his own songs, and as an exchange student in Kentucky in the U.S. he participated in musicals, talent contests and held his own concerts. In 1995, he was given the state award Kentucky Colonel, something he shares with the likes of Bing Crosby, Colonel Sanders and Winston Churchill.

In 1996, Ingebrigtsen got into the Liverpool Institute for Performing Arts (LIPA), where he studied songwriting and production. In 1998, he was one of 2500 auditioning for a new boy band. A teacher at LIPA recommended Ingebrigtsen to manager Tim Byrne working on putting together the group, and he became the third member of A1, who after becoming a quartet, signed a recording contract with Columbia Records in 1999.

=== A1 ===
Christian Ingebrigtsen is part of A1 (stylised as a1), an England-based pop group that was formed in 1998. The line-up consists of Ingebrigtsen, Mark Read and Ben Adams. Original member and founder Paul Marazzi was a member from 1998 until his departure in 2002. Ingebrigtsen is the only Norwegian in A1, as all the other members originate from London, England. A1 released Here We Come in 1999, The A List in 2000 and Make It Good in 2002, the year Marazzi left the band citing personal reasons.

The three remaining members subsequently decided to take a break. In December 2009, Ingebrigtsen, Read and Adams reformed A1 for a series of concerts in Norway. Since their comeback, they have released their fourth and fifth studio albums, Waiting for Daylight, in 2010 and Rediscovered, in 2012.

=== Solo career ===
In 2003, Ingebrigtsen started his career as a solo artist. His debut was the duet "In Love with an Angel" with Maria Arredondo. The song became a hit, staying three months in the top 10 list of VG-Lista Topp 20 (Norway's official single chart). Ingebrigtsen wrote the song "True Friendship" for Arredondo's debut album. In May of the same year, he made his debut as a solo performer with the song "Things Are Gonna Change". Ingebrigtsen had landed a recording contract with Universal Records and despite his fans in other countries from his A1-period, he chose to concentrate on the Norwegian market. The single went straight to number one on VG Lista Topp 20. "Take Back Yesterday" followed in November 2003.

His debut solo album was released on 27 December 2003. Entitled Take Back Yesterday it was backed up by a television advertisement campaign. The album was mainly produced by, and the songs largely written by Ingebrigtsen. The album made its debut at number 6 on the official album chart, VG Lista Topp 40, climbed to number 2 and stayed on as one of the ten best selling albums for two months. "In Love with an Angel" was nominated as Song of the Year for Spellemannprisen (Norwegian Grammys), but lost to World Idol winner Kurt Nilsen's "She's So High". The third single from the album, "Can't Give Up", was released in March 2004.

In 2006, Ingebrigtsen released a Christmas album for the Norwegian Salvation Army. Paint Christmas White was recorded with the Czech National Symphony Orchestra and was certified gold in Norway. The album included two self-penned songs; the title track "Paint Christmas White" and the track "Angels in the Snow".

In 2007, Ingebrigtsen released the album The Truth About Lies, including the singles, "Adorable" and "Learn to Fly", both getting considerable radio play in Norway, with "Adorable" reaching the number 1 on Norsktoppen.

In 2009, Christian played the role of Marius in the Norwegian production of Les Misérables in Oslo Nye Teater.

He has also co-written six entries in the Melodi Grand Prix, three of which came second, "Eastern Wind" written for Torstein Sødal, "Somewhere Beautiful" sung by Nora Foss al-Jabri and "Don't Wanna Lose You Again" sang by him and his band A1. The fourth song was "Sweeter Than a Kiss" sung by Charite. His most recent entry, "Attention" by Ulrikke, won Melodi Grand Prix 2020. He also wrote the song "Perfect Villain" performed by Zuhlke in Finland, also finishing 2nd place in the competition there. On 10 January 2022, he was announced as a competing artist in the 2022 competition with the song "Wonder of the World".

=== Entries in national Eurovision pre-selections ===
- "Eastern Wind" by Torstein Sødal (Norway 2008), 2nd place
- "Sweeter Than a Kiss" by Charite (Norway 2009), Eliminated (Semi-Final 1)
- "Don't Wanna Lose You Again" by A1 (Norway 2010), 2nd place
- "Somewhere Beautiful" by Nora Foss al-Jabri (Norway 2012), 2nd place
- "Perfect Villain" by Zühlke (Finland 2017), 2nd place
- "Attention" by Ulrikke (Norway 2020), 1st place
- "Own Yourself" by Dinaye (Norway 2021), Eliminated (Second Chance)
- "Eyes Wide Open" by Rein Alexander (Norway 2021), Eliminated (Final)
- "Wonder of the World" by Christian Ingebrigtsen (Norway 2022), Eliminated (Final)
- "Turn Off My Heart" by Bjørn Olav Edvardsen (Norway 2023), Eliminated (Semi-Final 2)

== Discography ==
=== Albums ===
- Take Back Yesterday (2003)
- Paint Christmas White (2005)
- The Truth About Lies (2007)
- Got to Be (2017)
- Loved (2024)

=== Singles ===
- "In Love with an Angel" (featuring Maria Arredondo) (2003)
- "Things Are Gonna Change" (2003)
- "Take Back Yesterday" (2003)
- "Can't Give Up" (2003)
- "Adorable" (2007)

=== Vocal appearances ===
- Brother Bear soundtrack (2004)
- Edward John: Find Me Guilty, Time to Give
- Radioactive: Forgiveness (9 November 2005)

== Filmography ==
- Jungelboken 2 (2003) Performing the music in the Norwegian version of Disney's The Jungle Book 2
- Min bror bjørnen (2004) The voice of Phil Collins in the Norwegian version of Disney's Brother Bear
- Sangstjerner (2007) TV3 – Judge on celebrity talent show, 10 episodes
- Lyden av lørdag (2007) NRK1 – Coach on the talent show, 11 Saturday nights on Norwegian prime time television.
- To på rømmen (2011) The voice of Flynn Rider in the Norwegian version of Disney's 50th animated movie Tangled.
