= Attention (Ulrikke Brandstorp song) =

2020 single by Ulrikke Brandstorp

Single by Ulrikke Brandstorp
- Released: 31 January 2020
- Length: 3:00
- Label: Ulrikke Records
- Songwriter(s): Christian Ingebrigtsen; Kjetil Mørland; Ulrikke Brandstorp
- Producer(s): Christian Ingebrigtsen; Kjetil Mørland

Ulrikke Brandstorp singles chronology
"Shallow" (2019)	"Attention" (2020)	"What Would You Do for Love?" (2020)

Eurovision Song Contest 2020 entry
- Country: Norway
- Artist(s): Ulrikke
- Language: English
- Composer(s): Christian Ingebrigtsen; Kjetil Mørland; Ulrikke Brandstorp
- Lyricist(s): Christian Ingebrigtsen; Kjetil Mørland; Ulrikke Brandstorp

Finals performance
- Semi-final result: Contest cancelled

Entry chronology
- ◄ "Spirit in the Sky" (2019)
- "Fallen Angel" (2021) ►

"Attention" is a song by Ulrikke Brandstorp. It would have represented Norway in the Eurovision Song Contest 2020. The song was released as a digital download on 31 January 2020. A simple ballad accompanied by a violin, it is about unrequited love.

== Eurovision Song Contest ==
The song was supposed to represent Norway in the Eurovision Song Contest 2020, after Ulrikke was selected through Melodi Grand Prix 2020, the music competition that selects Norway's entries for the Eurovision Song Contest. On 28 January 2020, a special allocation draw was held which placed each country into one of the two semi-finals, as well as which half of the show they would perform in. Norway was placed into the first semi-final, to be held on 12 May 2020, and was scheduled to perform in the second half of the show.

== Charts ==
Chart (2020)	Peak position
Norway (VG-lista)	3

== Certifications ==
Certifications for "Attention"
Region	Certification	Certified units/sales
Norway (IFPI Norway)	Platinum	60,000^{‡}
Norway (IFPI Norway) Klaas remix	Gold	30,000^{‡}
^{‡} Sales+streaming figures based on certification alone.

== Release history ==
Region	Date	Format	Label	Ref.
Various	31 January 2020	Digital download; streaming	Ulrikke Records	
