= Russefeiring =

Traditional celebration for Norwegian high school students

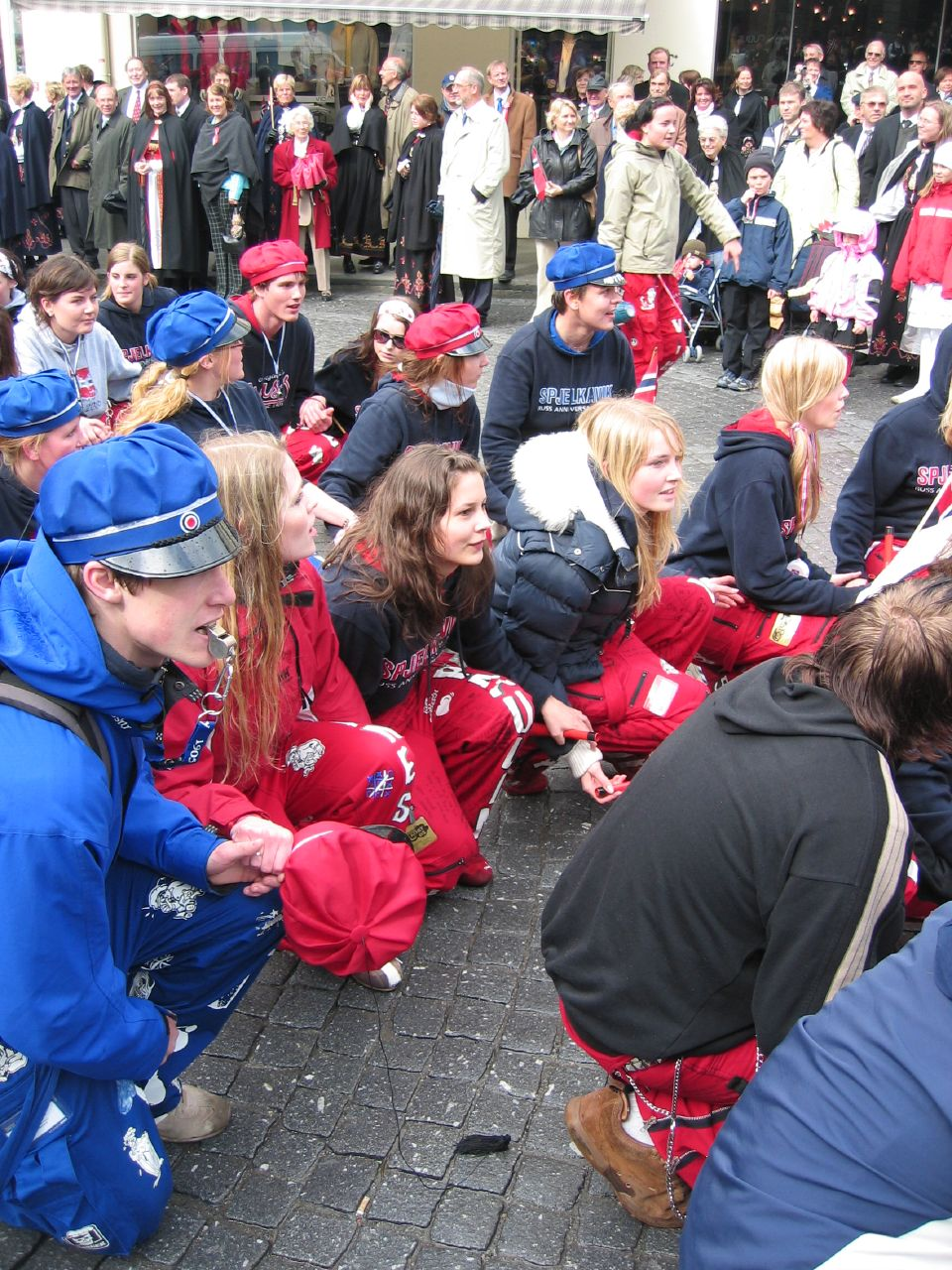
The russ of 2005 at 17 May parade in Oslo, Norway

The russefeiring (English: 'russ celebration') is a traditional celebration for Norwegian high school students in their final spring semester. Students that take part in the celebrations are known as russ. Students in high school normally prepare for this celebration from the start of the year. Russ celebrations normally happen before the final term exam for the high school students before they are off to university or college.

Russ celebrate all over Norway, but the traditions differ between regions and counties. Some purchase large buses to drive to events and to party in, while others may simply buy a van or a car. Not all russ, particularly in the big cities, have buses at all. The russefeiring traditionally starts around 20 April (with some starting earlier or later depending on the county) and ends on 17 May, the Norwegian Constitution day. Participants wear coloured overalls (usually red, blue, green, white, or black). Some form groups that name a bus, car or van (often making a name or logo).

Some celebrate almost continually during this period, and drunkenness and public disturbances are regularly linked to the celebration, creating yearly public debates on how to prevent the most negative outcomes of the russ tradition.

The word russ stems from the Latin word dēpositūrus ['which shall lay off'] ('som skal legge av').

== History ==
The modern Norwegian russefeiring has roots to the mid-1800s. In 1905, the red russ caps (russelue) were introduced to graduation celebrations as a sign of the imminent acceptance into the system of higher education. The caps were initially only used by boys, and were inspired by German students, who in 1904 wore red caps when they visited Norway. In 1916, blue caps were introduced at the Oslo Commerce School, a prestigious high school specializing in economics, in order to separate them from the common graduates. Later, celebrations were gradually extended, similarly coloured overalls (russedress) were added, and the caps were saved for the final day of celebrations.

As time passed, students graduating from vocational courses were allowed to participate in the celebrations, and additional overall and cap colours were gradually introduced by some of the vocational graduates. The celebrations then became a general celebration of the end of upper secondary school (videregående skole).

In Norway, most are 18 or 19 by the time of the russefeiring. The age of 18 is both the age limit for buying alcohol and acquiring a driver's license. Therefore, the growing festivities also led to increased alcohol consumption, and in the 1970s the tradition of buying old cars, vans, buses, and even lorries and painting them in the same colours as the overalls became common.

These cars would be extensively decorated, and serve as mobile homes and party venues for the russ during the russefeiring. They would be outfitted with tables, chairs, bunk beds, sound and lighting systems, and melodic horns. These vehicles were named russebiler (russ cars). Over the 1980s it became fairly common to rip the cargo beds off lorries and build log cabins on the frames instead. However, due to safety issues this practice was banned during the early 1990s. Also regulations were introduced that required every russ vehicle to have a designated non-russ driver. This, together with the no-tolerance policy on alcohol consumption by drivers introduced in the late 1990s, greatly reduced the number of accidents involving russ vehicles.

Russ cars and buses would gather for impromptu partying on school grounds, parking lots, beaches and other suitable places. Sometimes up to several hundreds of cars and buses would gather in one place. Eventually, these events became organized by commercial interests, who then also took over responsibility for the security of the participants. Still russ gather their vehicles for impromptu partying, but in smaller numbers.

By the early 2000s, authorities were once again worried about impact of the partying and alcohol consumption during the russefeiring. In an attempt to reduce the extent of the celebrations, some of the final exams in public schools were moved to early May. Traditionally, these had all been taking place in late May and early June. The idea was that forcing the pupils to prepare for exams instead of partying would reduce the extent of the problem. This had no noticeable effect, however, and resistance from pupils' organizations moved the exams back, with the argument that the only effect was to have pupils sacrifice grades for partying.

== Duration ==
The festivities start anytime between 11 April and 1 May (different dates for each city). On this date, russ are allowed to put on their overalls, board their vehicles, and officially become russ. From then on celebrations continue almost non-stop until 17 May (the national day). On this day the russ are awarded their caps, and participate in the traditional 17 May parades. In the meantime, there are a number of smaller and bigger events for russ to participate in. The dates of the biggest parties are usually the 1st where the students are 'christened' with personalized russ names which are written on their caps, and 16 May, which is the second biggest party night, as these two dates are followed by national holidays (May Day and Norwegian Constitution Day).

== Function ==
Russefeiring is a longstanding tradition and a major cultural phenomenon in Norway. Apart from being a celebration of the imminent end of 12 or 13 years of schooling, it has also become a rite of passage into adulthood, and a farewell to classmates from the videregående skole (upper secondary school) who will now go their separate ways in search for jobs or higher education. It is therefore an important period in the lives of most Norwegian adolescents.

In the period, there are several russetreff 'russ meetings'. At these events, tens of thousands of russ meet in an allocated area for one or more days. There are concerts, bus competitions in several circles (bus with the best sound systems, best lighting systems, best design, bus of the year and "Lord of the Rings"), and the sale of beer and food.

While russefeiring is optional, there are few pupils who do not participate in any way, although the extent of involvement varies individually. However, there are pupils who, due to personal or religious reasons, do not consume alcohol, and therefore object to the nature of many of the celebrations, which contribute to its image as the treukersfylla 'the three-week binge'. These pupils do not partake in common festivities to the same degree that other russ do and sometimes create their own events such as kristenruss 'Christian russ', often shortened to kruss.

=== Overall colors ===
There are several different types of russ, differing in the colour of the caps and traditional uniforms most students wear during the entire russ period. The uniform's colour usually reflects the student's course of study (see below). However, in some regions such as Stavanger, the colour is determined by the school. Typically in these areas, if the headmaster of the school was a blue russ, the students will also be blue regardless of what they are studying (vocational students will still usually be black russ).

Red (rødruss)
Allmennfag (general studies) (mathematics, physics, biology, history, literature, English, etc); media and communication, art, music, dance and drama; and athletics. This is the most common colour.
Blue (blåruss)
Business administration (økonomi & administrasjon)
Black (svartruss)
Vocational courses, like electronics, carpentry or culinary programs. As Norwegian vocational studies consist of two years of schooling and one or two years of apprenticeship, black russ can choose to celebrate at the end of school, at the end of the apprenticeship, or both. Some red russ choose black in order to stand out, although most red and blue russ do not acknowledge them as real russ. In fact, since most black russ are under 18 years old, they chose to order the red overalls in order to enter party sites where only those 18 or over are allowed.
Green (grønnruss)
Agricultural courses, also used by some as an alternative to orange russ.
White (hvitruss)
In some regions, athletics students or healthcare students use white uniforms. Christian russ choosing to celebrate without alcohol sometimes use this colour, but most often wear the same colours as their classmates. Christian russ might form their own groups to have fun together without peer pressure towards drinking alcohol and achieving the knot requirements.
Miscellaneous
Occasionally, children in the last year of kindergarten dress up as "pink russ" (rosaruss), or girls as pink russ and boys as light blue russ. In some places, pupils finishing the last year of middle school (ungdomsskolen) dress up as "orange russ" (oransjeruss) or "green russ" (grønnruss). These celebrations have not become very common.

== The russ board ==
It is common to appoint a russ president, a party coordinator, a newspaper editor, journalists, a contraceptive supervisor, and other amusing titles.

The russ president is responsible for the russ celebration and giving an interview to a local newspaper as well as holding a speech on Constitution Day. The party coordinator organizes parties with different themes (for instance "What are you going to be when you're fully educated?", "bad taste" and "Halloween"). The newspaper editor and the journalists make a russ newspaper. The contraceptive supervisor gets some thousand condoms from the Red Cross to pass out to the russ (the Red Cross gives away condoms for free to russ because of the massive increase in chlamydia, herpes and gonorrhea after May one year).

== "Knots and happenings" ==
Ståkuka translates roughly to 'the noisy week', but there is a play on words involved as ståkuk literally means 'erect penis'. Ståkuka is the last week in April, involving different dress themes. There is a different theme each day; typical themes are:

- Gender-change day
- Army day
- Pajama day
- Hero day
- Emo day
- Business day

=== Knots ===
The russ knots (Norwegian: russeknuter) on the string of the russ caps are a wide variety of rewards signaling that the student has fulfilled a certain accomplishment during the russ period. They can be simple knots or tokens attached to the string. Lists of assignments and associated knots are publicized each year by russ committees at schools and communities. The knot often consists of an item representing the accomplishment. For instance, passing through the back seat of a car stopping on a red light (inspired by the television advertisement for the sweet Mentos), earns them a piece of wrapping from the sweet. The russ knot list was first introduced in the 1940s.

The knot rules are sometimes criticized because they can involve illegal acts, such as public nudity or public sexual intercourse, outright assault and possibly self-harming actions such as consuming large amounts of alcohol in a short span of time (earning a beer cap or wine cork). Other more benign tasks exist, such as putting a for sale sign on a police car, or spending the night at a teacher's house and making him/her breakfast in the morning, all without being noticed. Counting both national and local lists, there can be hundreds of different tasks that can be performed to gain knots, with huge varieties between districts and individual schools. Due to criticism in media, many of the russ knots are removed and replaced by other knots every year to decrease their impact on the students. Some of the previous knots have been physically dangerous, such as drinking 24 bottles of beer within 24 hours, or placing half a box of snus under one's lip for a certain period of time. This can lead to alcohol poisoning and severe brain damage.

A few russ knot examples:

- Spending a night in a tree (earns a stick from the tree)
- Eating a Big Mac hamburger in two bites (earns a piece of the wrapping)
- Drinking a bottle of wine in 20 minutes (earns the wine cork)
- Crawling through a supermarket while barking and biting customers' legs (earns a dog biscuit)
- Spending a school day crawling on hands and knees (earns a toy shoe)
- Spending the entire russ period sober (earns a fizzy drink cork)
- Drinking 24 beers in 24 hours (girls) or 12 hours (boys)
- Go for a swim before 1 May
- Ask random people in a mall if they can lend one a condom (earns the condom)
- Stage a false break up with a random 16-year-old in public
- Sit in a roundabout with a sign saying Vi drikker hvis dere tuter! ('We'll have a drink if you honk your horn!'), or a variation, En tut = en skål! ('One honk = one drink!')
- Host an aerobic class at the local pub and get at least ten people to join.

It is common for every school to have about 100 knots. If a russ does 50 or 70 of them they can choose to do three extra embarrassing or hard knots to become an elite russ.

A few elite russ knot examples:

- Tattoo russ and the year they were russ on their body (For instance "Russ 09" if 2009).
- Make out with 10 people in one night.
- Give more than NOK 1,000 (about £100 and about US$120) to charity.
- Dye their hair in the colour they are russ (black, red or blue).

=== Vans (russebiler) and buses (russebusser) ===
In the older days russ often traveled around in an open lorry, either used as-is or with a self-made log cabin added to the cargo area. Today, groups of russ commonly join together to buy a russ van. In eastern Norway, such as the capital Oslo, the posh suburb of Bærum, and other surrounding cities and areas, russ often choose to have a full-scale bus. This phenomenon also happens in the city of Stavanger and its surrounding areas. Russ vans are typically 15- to 20-year-old Volkswagen Caravelles or Chevy Vans. The vehicle is painted in their respective russ colour, either by having it professionally sprayed or with regular wall paint. Decals and other decorations are common.

Russ vehicles bought cheap have a reputation for being in terrible technical condition. Inexperienced and intoxicated drivers, and in some cases even highly flammable alcohol spills, have contributed to fatal traffic accidents and fires in these vehicles. The Norwegian police take part in a concerted effort to improve the situation. Russ who acquire a bus are required by law to hire a professional bus driver for the duration of the celebration, while van drivers might be an older sibling, friend, or a russ who chooses to abstain from alcohol.

In the russ vehicle, modern tradition requires a powerful audio equipment inside the vehicle, and on buses also on the roof (the largest systems allowed have 40 speaker boxes which can generate over 60,000 watts. Some buses have had over 60 speaker boxes. Other accessories include sweatshirts and caps with the group's chosen logo and a bus song or slogan. It is also common to have some sort of theme for the interior and name/concept. Many buses have expensive themed interiors, sometimes a bar, and plenty of flat-screen TVs. A party light system is also common in buses.

These buses can be a large financial burden; contributions of up to $30,000 per member have occurred. In some cases, the teenager's parents invest most of the money needed for the buses. However, the average is between $2,000 and $6,000 per member. Including sponsors, the cost of a bus can reach over NOK 2,000,000. (US$250,000).

While some are willing to spend very high sums of money during the russ festivities, mostly on the van or bus but also on clothes, effects, parties (there are special happenings for russ all over the country) and alcohol, most who invest in a vehicle at all aim to buy a cheap van together with a group of friends. An old van can be passed on to the next generation of russ several times before it is discarded.

It is customary to spend substantial amounts of time working on the vehicle, finding a concept, refurbishing the inside, painting the outside and applying for funding during the weeks (and sometimes years) before the festivities start. Logos of sponsors are written onto the vehicle together with other decorations. Some undertake major rebuilds of the interior, like building a bar counter or beds within the bus. It is not uncommon to start planning the bus several years before the celebration. Everything in the russ celebration is taken care of by the russ themselves, except the bigger events. These events feature shops selling alcohol and food, international artist performances and most importantly, russekåringen (lit. 'the russ awards'), where busses receive awards for the best theme, interior design, sound system, light system, best live-bus, and the most prestigious: the bus of the year.

=== Cards (russekort) ===
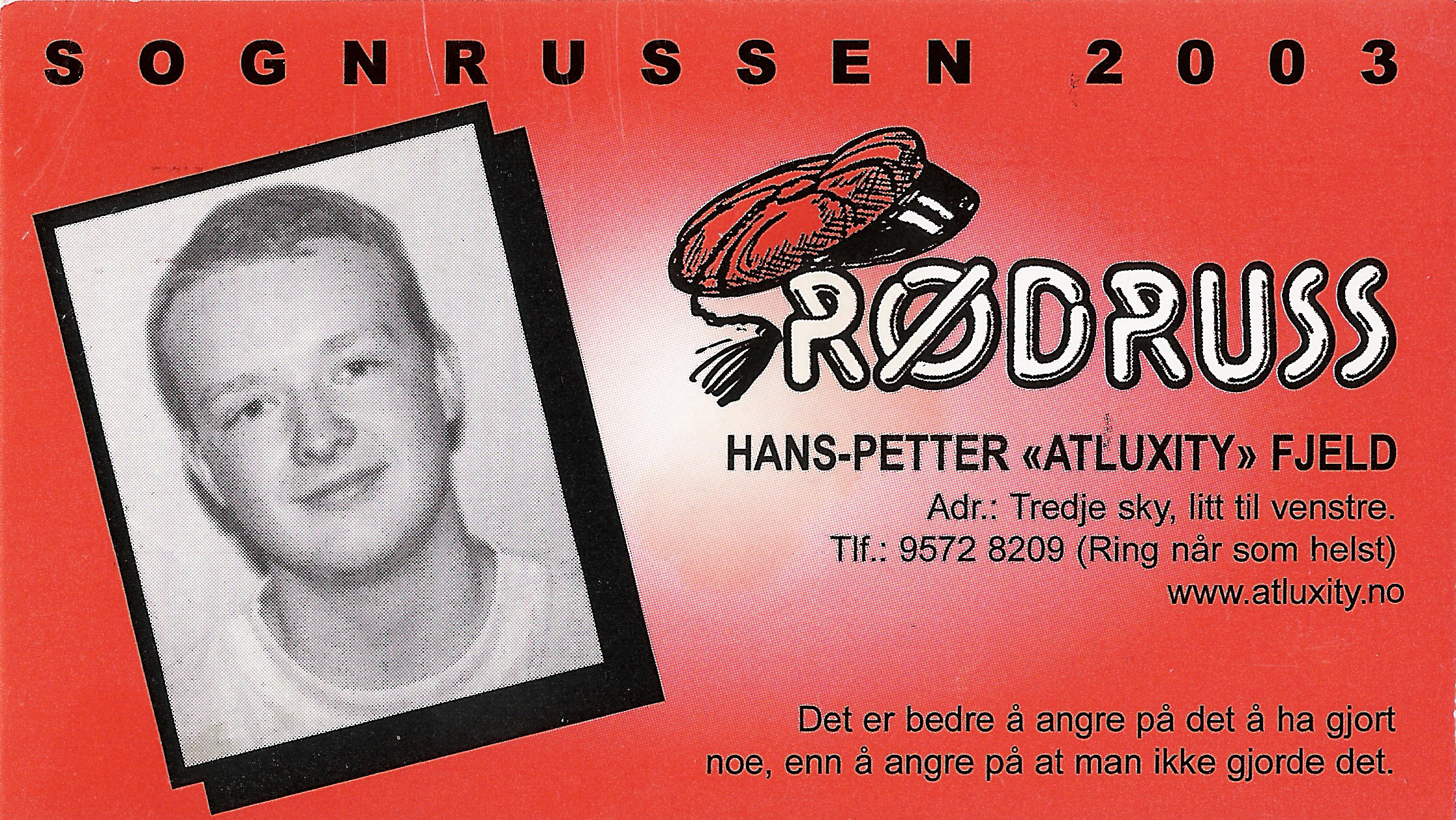
Russekort from 2003

Most russ have personalized calling cards featuring their name, photograph, phone number, address, and a short slogan or joke. Often times information such as the phone number or address is swapped with intentionally wrong information to add to the joke/slogan on the card, or to add additional jokes. These cards are swapped with other russ and handed out to children and family members. To many children, collecting russ cards is an important activity during the entire russ period, but especially May, culminating on 17 May.

=== Newspapers (russeavis) ===
To finance some of the administrative costs, many high schools create russ newspapers containing fake news, a column written by the russ president, official knot rules for the specific school, and other content, mostly humorous. The most important feature of a russ newspaper, however, is a section featuring every class and student with a photograph and a personalized biography, typically written by friends in a jocular and satirical style. The class may also write a similar entry on their main teacher; the teacher, in turn, writes about their class. The russ newspaper is written and published by the russ board (russens hovedstyre).

== Equivalent celebrations ==
The tradition of celebrating the admission to the university can also be found in Denmark and Sweden. The new students are called rus (Denmark) or russ (Sweden). The celebrations are very different depending on the student type. In Sweden, for example, it can be a student revue, in Denmark a tour with the platform truck, which is decorated with birch.

Students in Denmark, Sweden, Iceland, and Finland wear white student caps, a tradition from the middle of the 18th century. These student caps are called ylioppilaslakki, valkolakki (Finnish), studenterkørelse studenterhue (Danish) and Studentmössa (Swedish). Individuals also wear special colored (red, blue, black, green, orange, and pink) costumes. Since the old student exam in Sweden was abolished in 1969, the student celebrations there are now very reserved. In the past, for example, registered high school students were able to wear their white student cap all summer until they started studying in autumn. In recent years, the student celebrations in Sweden have experienced an upswing again. Today these are usually initiated with the so-called Mösspåtagning, a kind of "russ baptism".

== See also ==
- Schoolies week, a similar concept in Australia
- Studenten, 'the student', the Swedish, Finnish and Danish equivalents.
- The student cap, which closely resembles the russ cap and is worn by students in various European countries. It can be of different colours depending on the type of education received.
- Russ music, also known as russemusikk.
