= Ulrikke Brandstorp =

Norwegian singer-songwriter (born 1995)

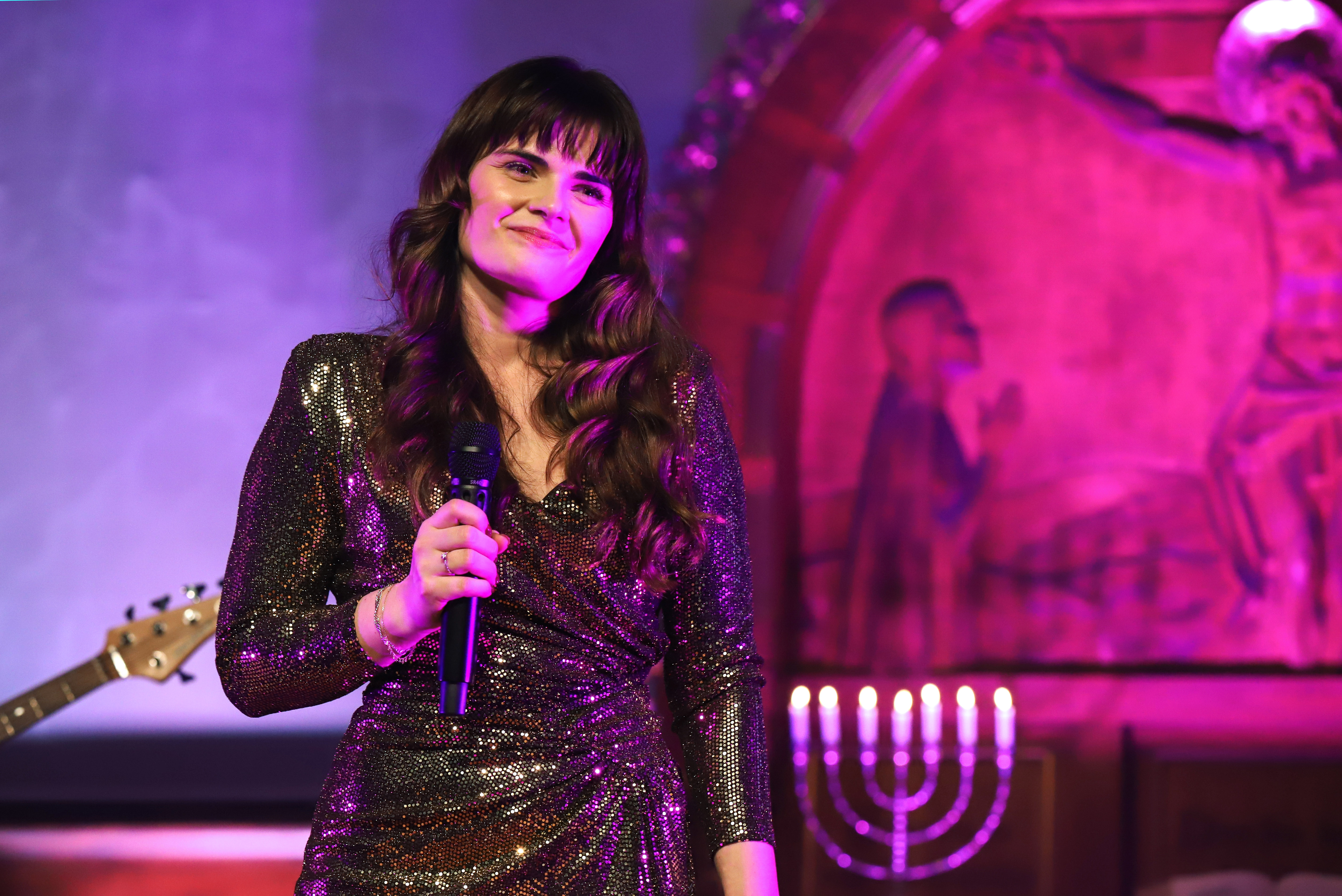
- Brandstorp in 2022

Background information
- Also known as: Ulrikke
- Born: 13 July 1995 (age 31); Sarpsborg, Norway
- Genre: Pop
- Occupations: Singer; songwriter; musical actress; voice actress
- Years active: 2013–present
- Website: ulrikkeofficial.com

Ulrikke Brandstorp (born 13 July 1995), also known mononymously as Ulrikke, is a Norwegian singer, songwriter, musical actress, voice actress and television presenter.

== Early life ==
Ulrikke Brandstorp was born on 13 July 1995 in Skjeberg, a district of Sarpsborg, to Jørn and Vigdis Brandstorp, being the youngest of three children.

Her musical talents were first spotted when she won a local singing competition when she was eight, while she also participated in Villekula youth theatre in her native Østfold, starring in local productions of Pippi Longstocking and Reisen til julestjernen. Between 2011 and 2013, Brandstorp embarked on a Norwegian tour with The Show Must Go On and The Thrill of Michael Jackson.

== Career ==
Brandstorp made her national breakthrough when she participated in the seventh series of Idol in 2013, but was eliminated in the semi-finals.

She later participated in the third series of The Voice – Norges beste stemme in 2015, but was eliminated in the battle rounds.

Brandstorp became a major household name in Norway in 2018, when she finished second in Stjernekamp, and has subsequently appeared in four seasons of Allsang på Grensen, most notably in 2019, when she, together with Ben Adams, covered "Shallow".

She also participated in the first series of Maskorama in 2020, performing under the name "Troll" and winning the competition on 12 December.

Brandstorp later finished eighth in the second series of Kompani Lauritzen in 2021.

=== Melodi Grand Prix ===
Brandstorp participated in Melodi Grand Prix for the first time in 2017, finishing in fourth place in the final with "Places".

She returned to Melodi Grand Prix in 2020, with the song "Attention". Having been the odds-on favourite to win the competition, Brandstorp was selected as the Norwegian entry in the Eurovision Song Contest 2020 on 15 February, and was viewed as one of the early favourites to win the contest in Rotterdam.

However, the contest was cancelled on 18 March, due to the emerging COVID-19 pandemic. Brandstorp declined an offer of automatic qualification for the final of Melodi Grand Prix in 2021, citing a desire to find the right song for any potential return. She accepted an offer from NRK to return as a guest in the final, performing a new version of "Attention" as the opening act and her most recent release, "Falling Apart", during the interval.

Brandstorp participated in Melodi Grand Prix for a third time in 2023, with the song "Honestly". The song competed in the first semi-final on 14 January, and subsequently qualified for the final on 4 February, finishing in second place.

=== Acting ===
Brandstorp was cast as Liesl von Trapp in the Norwegian production of The Sound of Music, which performed in Folketeateret in Oslo in 2019.

She was later cast as Sophie Sheridan in the Norwegian production of Mamma Mia!, which performed in Folketeateret in 2021.

Brandstorp was subsequently cast as the Norwegian voice of Mirabel Madrigal in the 2021 Disney fantasy comedy Encanto.

=== Television appearances ===
It was announced on 11 April 2023 that Brandstorp would present Bakemesterskapet, an upcoming television baking competition based on The Great British Bake Off. The series will premiere on NRK in early 2024.

She took part in the 19th season of Skal vi danse, the Norwegian version of Dancing with the Stars, alongside professional dancer Tarjei Svalastog. The pair finished in third place after accumulating less viewer votes than Aslak Maurstad and Marianne Sandaker, narrowly missing out on a spot in the final.

Summary
Week no.	Dance	Song	Judges' scores	Total	Result
1	Foxtrot	"Make Your Own Kind of Music"	7 + 8 + 8	23	No elimination
2	Argentine tango	"Can't Get You Out of My Head"	8 + 9 + 8	25	Safe
3	Samba	"The Greatest"	9 + 8 + 8	25	Safe
4	Cha Cha Cha	"A Little Party Never Killed Nobody (All We Got)"	8 + 8 + 8	24	Safe
5	Boogie-woogie	"Jump, Jive an' Wail"	9 + 8 + 9	26	Safe
6	Tango	"Highway to Hell"	7 + 7 + 7	21	Doubt
7	Jive	"Tightrope"	9 + 10 + 9	28	Safe
8	Modern	"I'll Be Waiting"	9 + 9 + 10	28	Duel - safe
9	Salsa	"The Family Madrigal"	9 + 10 + 9	28	Duel - safe
10	Pasodoble	"Dance Dance Dance With My Hands"	9 + 10 + 9	28	Safe
11	Viennese waltz	"Floden"	9 + 10 + 9	28	Semi-final
11	Samba	"Taki Taki"	10 + 10 + 10	30	Duel - eliminated

== Personal life ==
Brandstorp has been in a relationship with Oskar Nordberg since April 2020, with Brandstorp writing the song "Love You to Love Me" as a declaration of her love for Nordberg. The couple got engaged in May 2022. They married in June 2024. Their first child, a son, was born two months before Brandstorp's due date, which had been June 2025.

== Discography ==
=== Studio albums ===
Title	Details
Spend Christmas with Me	Released: 20 November 2020; Label: Self-released; Format: Digital download, streaming

=== Singles ===
==== As lead artist ====
Title	Year	Peak chart positions	Certifications	Album or EP
Title	Year	NOR	Certifications	Album or EP
"Play With"	2017	—		Non-album singles
"Places"	2017	—		Non-album singles
"Sick of Love"	2017	—		Non-album singles
"Careless"	2018	—		Non-album singles
"Time Is Precious"	2018	—		Non-album singles
"Cry"	2019	—		Non-album singles
"Shallow" (with Ben Adams)	2019	—		Non-album singles
"Attention"	2020	3	IFPI NOR: Platinum	Non-album singles
"What Would You Do for Love?"	2020	—		Non-album singles
"Nyttårsnatt" (with Trygve Skaug)	2020	—		Spend Christmas with Me
"Hver gang jeg ser deg" (with Morgan Sulele)	2021	—		Non-album singles
"Falling Apart"	2021	—		Non-album singles
"Ja, vi elsker dette landet"	2021	—		Non-album singles
"Love You to Love Me"	2022	—		Non-album singles
"Talk to Me"	2022	—		Non-album singles
"Young"	2022	—		Non-album singles
"Feels Like Home"	2022	—		Non-album singles
"Her vi hører til"	2022	—		Non-album singles
"Honestly"	2023	35		Non-album singles
"Til evig tid"	2023	—		Non-album singles
"Om hundre år"	2024	—		Non-album singles
"Gråter du" (with Jim Bergsted)	2025	—		Non-album singles
"Når jula banker på"	2025	—		Non-album singles
"—" denotes a recording that did not chart or was not released in that territory.

==== As featured artist ====
Title	Year	Album or EP
"Alt jeg ønsker" (Agera featuring Ulrikke)	2017	Non-album singles
"Fuckboy" (Oda Loves You featuring Ulrikke)	2018	Non-album singles

=== Other appearances ===
Title	Year	Album or EP
"A Storm for Christmas"	2022	A Storm for Christmas (Soundtrack from the Netflix Series)

Preceded by Keiino with "Spirit in the Sky"	Norway in the Eurovision Song Contest; 2020 (cancelled)	Succeeded by Tix with "Fallen Angel"
