= Willkommen Folk Tell Drekka Fest! =

Willkommen Folk tell Drekka Fest!

Studio album by Trollfest
- Released: March 15, 2005
- Genre: Folk metal

Trollfest chronology
TrollfesT - Promo (2004)	Willkommen Folk tell Drekka Fest! (2005)	Brakebein (2006)

Wilkommen Folk Tell Drekka Fest! is the debut full-length album by Norwegian folk metal band, Trollfest. It was released on March 15, 2005 by Solistitium Records. The album name translates roughly to "Welcome Folk to the Drinking Feast" in English.

== Track listing ==
1. "Trollfest" - 1:31
2. "Willkommen Folk tell Drekka Fest" - 3:21
3. "Helvetes Hunden GARM" - 3:44
4. "En ytterst Heftig Sak" - 2:48
5. "Sagaen om Suttungs-Mjöd" - 3:38
6. "Der Erste Krieg" - 4:15
7. "DU kom for seint..." - 3:20
8. "TrollKamp" - 1:38
9. "Die Urgammal GeBräu" - 3:35
10. "Offer-Visa" - 2:26
11. "Der Tag Nach-hinter" - 2:27
12. "...Nå må DU Drikka mest!!" - 3:48
