= Gaute Ormåsen =

Norwegian singer (born 1983)

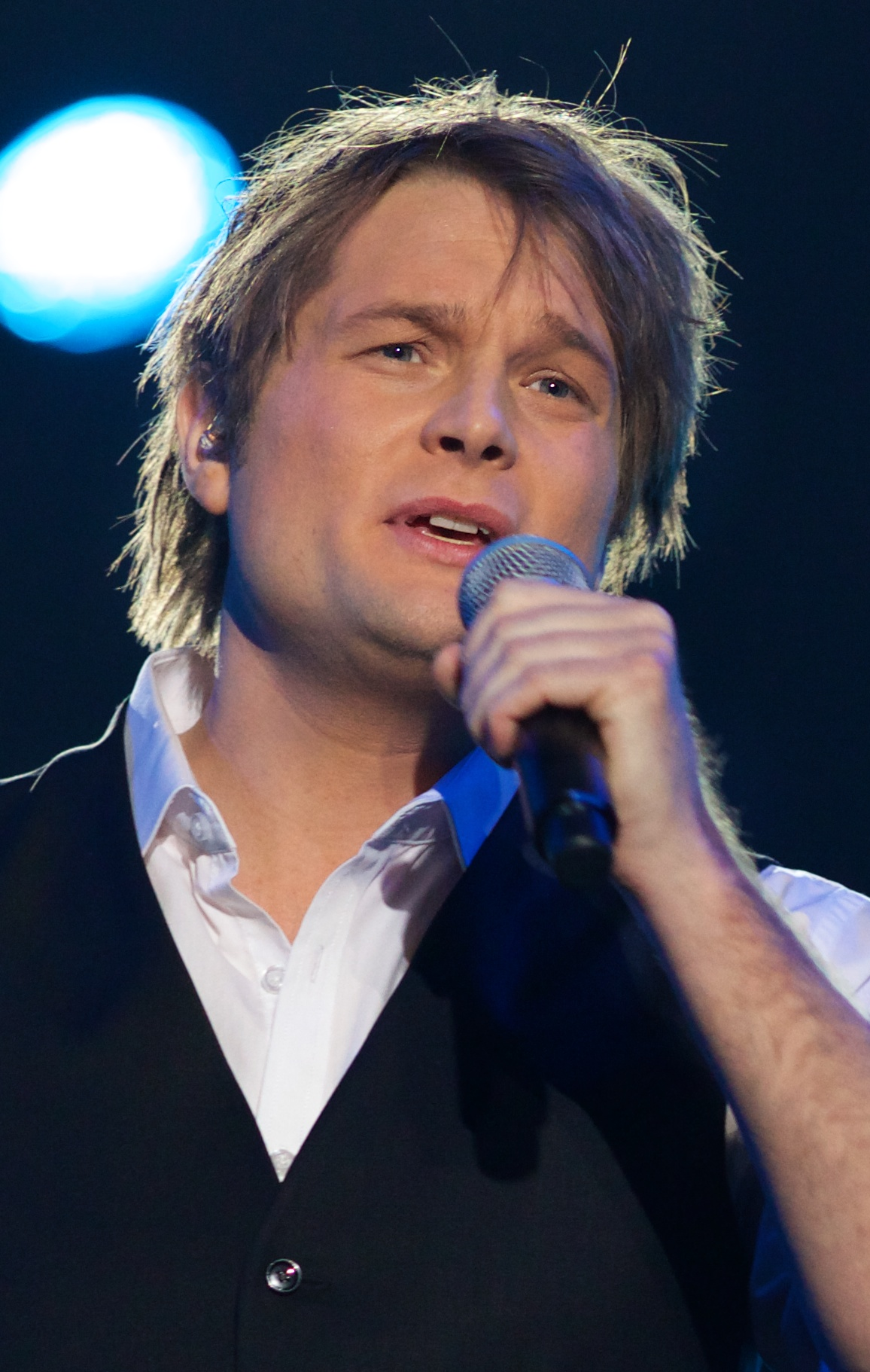

Background information
- Born: 20 April 1983 (age 43); Brumunddal, Hedmark, Norway
- Genres: Pop, country
- Occupations: Singer, songwriter
- Years active: 2003 – present
- Labels: Tylden & Co.
- Member of: Subwoolfer
- Website: gauteormaasen.no

Gaute Ormåsen (born 20 April 1983) is a Norwegian singer and was the Idol runner-up to Kurt Nilsen in 2003. He represented Norway in the Eurovision Song Contest 2022 along with Ben Adams as a part of pop band Subwoolfer.

After taking part in Idol, Ormåsen was offered a contract by BMG. He has also had a supporting role in the long running Norwegian television series Hotel Cæsar.

In 2010, he took part in Melodi Grand Prix, the Norwegian preselection for the Eurovision Song Contest, singing "Synk eller svøm" reaching the second chance round without getting to the final, and again in 2013 singing "Awake", reaching the final but failing to reach the top 4. Ormåsen participated in and won Melodi Grand Prix 2022 as part of Subwoolfer with "Give That Wolf a Banana". He then took part again in Melodi Grand Prix in 2024 alongside Erika Norwich with the song "My AI", managing to advance to the final where they ultimately placed third; Ormåsen performed behind the avatar of "Super Rob", revealing his real identity only after the final.

== Personal life ==
Born in Brumunddal, Hedmark, Gaute Ormåsen has a twin brother, Hogne Ormåsen. His elder brother Henrik Ormåsen is a spokesman for Serve the People (Norway).

He sings in Norwegian, Danish and English.

== Discography ==
=== Studio albums ===
List of studio albums, with selected details
| Title | Details | Peak chart positions |
| Title | Details | NOR |
|---|---|---|
| New Kid in Town | Released: 13 October 2003; Label: BMG Norway; Formats: Physical, digital download, streaming | 2 |
| G for Gaute | Released: 20 March 2006; Label: Tylden / Universal; Formats: Physical, digital download, streaming | 9 |
| Drømmesang | Released: 18 February 2008; Label: Tylden / Universal; Formats: Physical, digital download, streaming | 17 |
| Oss i mellom | Released: 15 February 2010; Label: Tylden / Universal; Formats: Physical, digital download, streaming | 37 |
| Kjærlighet er mer enn forelskelse (De 15 beste) | Released: 14 June 2016; Label: Tylden / Universal; Formats: Physical, digital download, streaming | — |
| Gode venner i Nepal | Released: 12 August 2016; Label: Incicon; Formats: Physical, digital download, streaming | — |
| Sivatas og månefesten | Released: 15 August 2017; Label: Incicon; Formats: Digital download, streaming | — |
| Sivatas og elefantparaden | Released: 20 August 2018; Label: Incicon; Formats: Digital download, streaming | — |
"—" denotes a recording that did not chart or was not released in that territory.

=== Singles ===
==== As lead artist ====
| Title | Year | Peak chart positions | Album or EP |
| Title | Year | NOR | Album or EP |
|---|---|---|---|
| "Chasing Rainbows" | 2003 | 1 | New Kid in Town |
| "Miss You When You're Gone" | 2003 | 12 | New Kid in Town |
| "Kjærlighet er mer enn forelskelse" | 2006 | 4 | G for Gaute |
| "To som vart by" (with Kaia Huuse) | 2010 | — | Non-album singles |
| "God jul og godt nyttår" (with Cecilia Vennersten) | 2010 | — | Non-album singles |
| "Hei sommer (Kjærlighetsvise til sommeren)" | 2012 | — | Non-album singles |
| "Kamilla og Sebastian" | 2012 | — | Non-album singles |
| "Hide" | 2014 | — | Non-album singles |
| "Smak av deg" | 2015 | — | Non-album singles |
| "Den første julenatt" (with Christian Ingebrigtsen and Trine Rein, featuring Trond Lien and Frøydis Grorud) | 2015 | — | Non-album singles |
| "Oslo sover aldri" | 2017 | — | Non-album singles |
| "Saganatt" (with Robin og Bugge) | 2017 | — | Non-album singles |
| "Alvinas trollharmoni" | 2018 | — | Non-album singles |
| "Patriot-Paula" | 2018 | — | Non-album singles |
| "Million mil (Skoleløpet)" | 2019 | — | Non-album singles |
| "Det blir fred" | 2019 | — | Non-album singles |
| "Tusenvis av lysglimt" (with Marie Klåpbakken) | 2020 | — | Non-album singles |
| "Jul uten bæssfar" | 2020 | — | Non-album singles |
| "Tempo Corvette" | 2021 | — | Non-album singles |
| "Sommartider" | 2022 | — | Non-album singles |
| "Kråkevisa" (with Solli) | 2023 | — | Non-album singles |
| "My AI" (as Super Rob, with Erika Norwich) | 2024 | 9 | Non-album singles |
"—" denotes a recording that did not chart or was not released in that territory.

==== As part of Subwoolfer ====
List of singles, with selected chart positions
| Title | Year | Peak chart positions | | | | | | Album |
| Title | Year | NOR | IRE | LTU | NLD | SWE | UK | Album |
|---|---|---|---|---|---|---|---|---|
| "Give That Wolf a Banana" | 2022 | 4 | 59 | 10 | 54 | 13 | 47 | Non-album singles |
| "Give That Wolf a Romantic Banana" | 2022 | — | — | — | — | — | — | Non-album singles |
| "Melocoton (The Donka Donk Song)" | 2022 | — | — | — | — | — | — | Non-album singles |
| "Howling" (featuring Luna Ferrari) | 2022 | — | — | — | — | — | — | Non-album singles |
| "Having Grandma Here for Christmas" | 2022 | — | — | — | — | — | — | Non-album singles |
| "Worst Kept Secret" | 2023 | — | — | — | — | — | — | Non-album singles |
| "Coco Pops" (with Subkids) | 2023 | — | — | — | — | — | — | Non-album singles |
| "We Wrote a Book" | 2023 | — | — | — | — | — | — | Non-album singles |
| "I Think I Killed Rudolph" (with a1) | 2023 | — | — | — | — | — | — | Non-album singles |
| "Spaceman" (with DJ Astronaut) | 2024 | — | — | — | — | — | — | Non-album singles |
"—" denotes a recording that did not chart or was not released in that territory.

==== As featured artist ====
| Title | Year | Album or EP |
|---|---|---|
| "Sammen finner vi frem" (Ylvis featuring Gaute Ormåsen and various artists) | 2011 | Non-album single |
| "Til vi sees igjen" (Reflex and Martin Alfsen featuring Gaute Ormåsen) | 2013 | God Loves Norwegian Country |
| "Like a Flower Needs the Rain" (Reflex and Martin Alfsen featuring Bjøro Håland and Gaute Ormåsen) | 2013 | God Loves Norwegian Country |
| "Fedrelandet" (Robin og Bugge featuring Gaute Ormåsen) | 2016 | Non-album singles |
| "Miracles" (Oslo 2016 featuring Alexander Rybak and Gaute Ormåsen) | | Non-album singles |
| "Tenn lys" (Trude Kristin Klæboe featuring Gaute Ormåsen) | 2017 | Vinterlys |
| "Tonstad" (Haughom featuring Gaute Ormåsen) | 2023 | Non-album singles |
| "Can't Forget" (Light Fusion featuring Gaute Ormåsen) | 2023 | Non-album singles |

==== Other appearances ====
| Title | Year | Album or EP |
|---|---|---|
| "Romjulsdrøm" | 2006 | Hjem til jul (En musikalsk julekalender) |
| "The First Noel" | 2008 | Time for Peace |
| "Peace in the Valley" | 2008 | Time for Peace |
| "Angels We Have Heard on High" | 2008 | Time for Peace |
| "Come On Let's Celebrate" (with Knut Anders Sørum, Nora Foss al-Jabri, and Trine Rein) | 2008 | Time for Peace |
| "Synk eller svøm" | 2010 | Sommerfest! |
