= Subwoolfer =

British-Norwegian pop music trio

- Origin: Norway
- Genres: Pop; electropop; EDM
- Years active: 2021–present
- Label: Universal Music
- Members: Ben Adams (Keith); Gaute Ormåsen (Jim); Carl-Henrik Wahl (DJ Astronaut)
- Website: www.subwoolfer.no

Subwoolfer is a British-Norwegian pop trio formed in 2022. Two of the members perform as wolves in black suits with white shirts with distinctive yellow stylized wolf-head masks and yellow gloves and ties and go by the pseudonyms Keith and Jim. The third member, DJ Astronaut joins them on stage in a golden astronaut suit. The wolves' identities were publicly revealed on 4 February 2023 as Ben Adams and Gaute Ormåsen, during the final of Melodi Grand Prix 2023. After winning Melodi Grand Prix 2022, they represented Norway in the Eurovision Song Contest 2022 with their debut song "Give That Wolf a Banana". The name of the group is a portmanteau of the words subwoofer and wolf.

== History ==
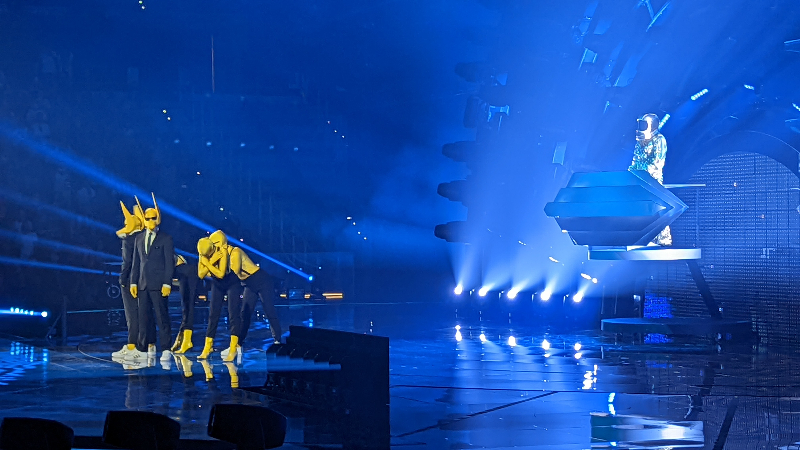
Subwoolfer performing at the Eurovision 2022 semi-final

On 10 January 2022, the Norwegian public broadcaster, NRK, revealed that Subwoolfer would compete in Melodi Grand Prix 2022, the Norwegian national selection for the Eurovision Song Contest 2022. Having been selected as an automatically qualified finalist, they were scheduled to showcase their entry "Give That Wolf a Banana" in the third heat of the competition on 29 January. However, their performance was postponed to the fourth heat, due to a positive COVID-19 test. They performed "Give That Wolf a Banana" again in the final on 19 February, and went on to win the competition with 368,106 votes from the public. With their victory, they were selected to represent Norway in the Eurovision Song Contest 2022, which was held in Turin, Italy.

On 11 February 2022, Subwoolfer released a Valentine's Day version of "Give That Wolf a Banana", titled "Give That Wolf a Romantic Banana". As of 29 September 2025, "Give That Wolf a Banana" has been streamed more than 43.1 million times on Spotify, with its Valentine edition having been streamed over 1.7 million times.

As Keith and Jim dress in yellow wolf-like masks during performances, the duo's real identities remained undisclosed throughout 2022. Their desired anonymity led to some speculation on social media regarding their identities. At the time, Keith and Jim's speculated identities included the Ylvis brothers, Gaute Ormåsen, Ben Adams and Erik & Kriss. A fictional origin story about the duo states that they are the "most successful band in our galaxy," and began their career "4.5 billion years ago on the Moon."

On 10 May 2022, NRK filmed DJ Astronaut taking off his helmet, with his identity speculated to be Tix, the Norwegian entrant at the Eurovision Song Contest 2021. This was later denied by the Norwegian head of delegation, Stig Karlsen, and Tix himself. Tix was later revealed to be the Norwegian jury spokesperson for the Eurovision 2022 final.

On 23 May 2022, Subwoolfer announced that "new music [would be] out soon" in a music video on YouTube for their parody of "Grace Kelly" by Mika, titled "Space Kelly" which had gained over 1 million views as of 17 June 2022. On 1 July 2022, Subwoolfer released "Melocoton (The Donka Donk Song)", their first song since the Eurovision Song Contest. It was accompanied by a music video.

On 21 October 2022, Subwoolfer released a new single, "Howling", which features guest vocals from Luna Ferrari, the "sister" of Keith and Jim. The music video for Howling was released on 21 October 2022. In December 2022, Subwoolfer made a short guest appearance on The Big Fat Quiz of the Year after a question on their Eurovision entry was featured in the music round.

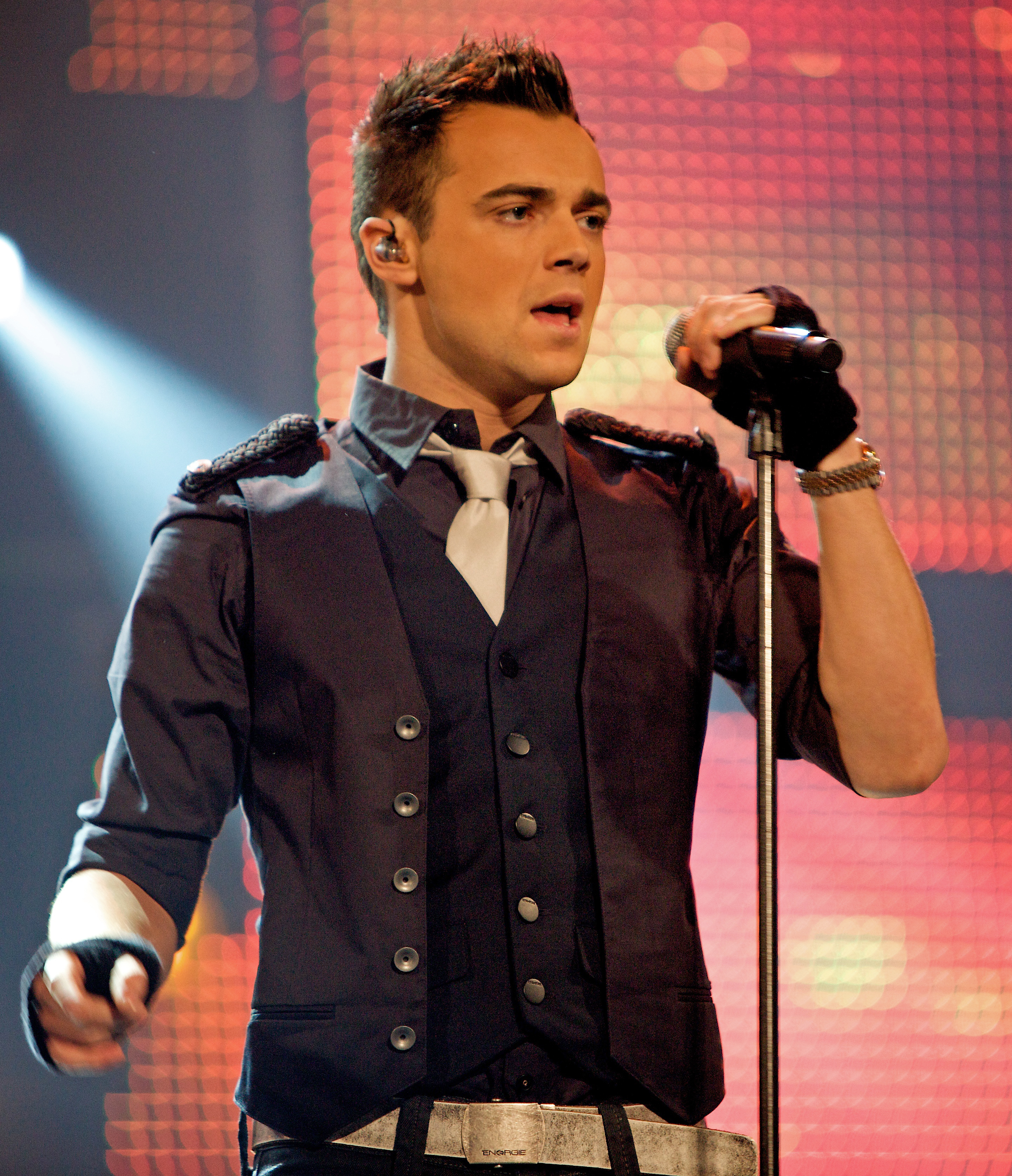
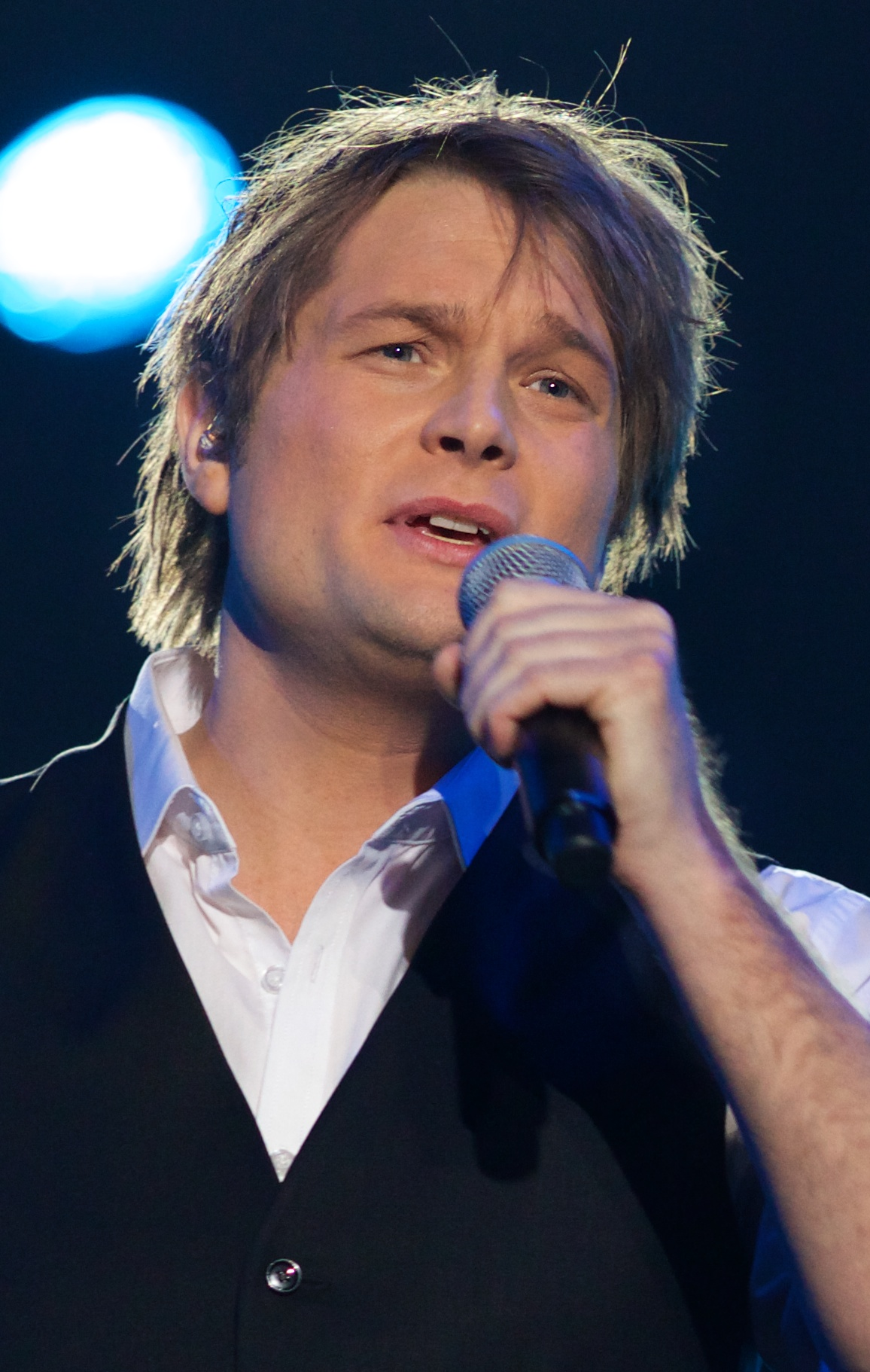
Ben Adams and Gaute Ormåsen

On 4 February 2023, Subwoolfer appeared in the final of Melodi Grand Prix 2023, where they took their masks off, and it was confirmed that Keith and Jim were Adams and Ormåsen respectively. After Eurovision the mantle of DJ Astronaut was given to Carl-Henrik Wahl, who was the wolves's "translator" in Eurovision, providing improvised answers to questions in interviews as the wolves could not speak. He also performs as the DJ at Subkids's shows.

On 3 March 2023, the documentary "Worst Kept Secret: The Subwoolfer Documentary" was released. In the documentary was revealed that DJ Astronaut was initially played by Ormåsen himself on stage while a stand-in danced in the front row as Jim, excluding the idea of an actual third musician or singer in the group.

On 2025 December 24th, their new single, "Dark Side of the Moon" was published, after 1 year and 4 days of nothing.

== Discography ==
=== Singles ===
List of singles, with selected chart positions
Title	Year	Peak chart positions						Album
Title	Year	NOR	IRE	LTU	NLD	SWE	UK	Album
"Give That Wolf a Banana"	2022	4	59	10	54	13	47	Non-album singles
"Give That Wolf a Romantic Banana"	2022	—	—	—	—	—	—	Non-album singles
"Melocoton (The Donka Donk Song)"	2022	—	—	—	—	—	—	Non-album singles
"Howling" (featuring Luna Ferrari)	2022	—	—	—	—	—	—	Non-album singles
"Having Grandma Here for Christmas"	2022	—	—	—	—	—	—	Non-album singles
"Worst Kept Secret"	2023	—	—	—	—	—	—	Non-album singles
"Coco Pops" (with Subkids)	2023	—	—	—	—	—	—	Non-album singles
"We Wrote a Book"	2023	—	—	—	—	—	—	Non-album singles
"I Think I Killed Rudolph" (with a1)	2023	—	—	—	—	—	—	Non-album singles
"Spaceman" (with DJ Astronaut)	2024	—	—	—	—	—	—	Non-album singles
"Fish" (with Subkids and DJ Astronaut)	2024	—	—	—	—	—	—	Non-album singles
"MMH" (with DJ Astronaut)	2024	—	—	—	—	—	—	Non-album singles
"Train" (with Subkids and DJ Astronaut)	2024	—	—	—	—	—	—	Non-album singles
"Dance Moves Should Be Bigger"	2024	—	—	—	—	—	—	Non-album singles
"Dark Side of the Moon"	2025	—	—	—	—	—	—	Non-album singles
"—" denotes a recording that did not chart or was not released in that territory.

Awards and achievements
Preceded by Tix with "Fallen Angel"	Norway in the Eurovision Song Contest; 2022	Succeeded by Alessandra with "Queen of Kings"
