= Trollfest =

Norwegian folk metal band

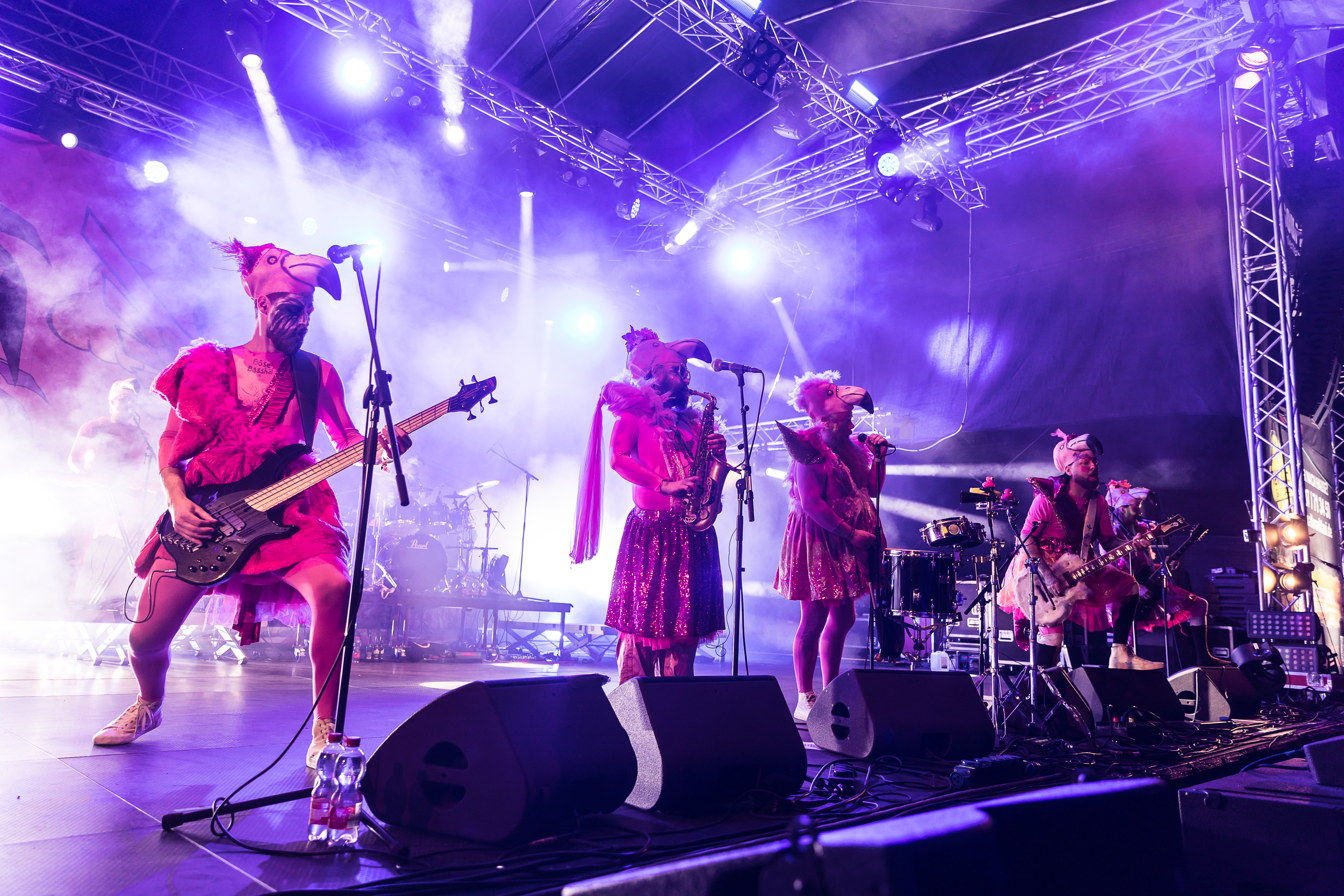
- Trollfest performing at Metal Frenzy in 2025

Background information
- Origin: Oslo, Norway
- Genre: Folk metal
- Years active: 2003–present
- Label: NoiseArt Records
- Members: Trollmannen; Mr. Seidel; Trollbank; Drekka Dag; Fabio Grimdrap; Böesse Basshöl; Fjernkontrollet; Kjellkjé; Bok'n'Brusetruse
- Past members: Per Spelemann; Psychotroll; St Beinhard; Manskow; Dr.Leif Kjønnsfleis; Kaptein Tut; Lodd Bolt
- Website: trollfest.com

Trollfest (stylized as TrollfesT) is a Norwegian folk metal band. They released their debut album, Willkommen Folk Tell Drekka Fest, in 2005. The album name translates roughly to "Welcome Folk to the Drinking Feast" in English. Their second album, Brakebein, was released in 2006. The band performed at the 2007 Barther Metal Openair festival in Germany, which was their first-ever live appearance. In 2008, they played at the pagan metal Ragnarök Festival. In January 2022, the band were announced as an act in Melodi Grand Prix 2022 with the song "Dance Like a Pink Flamingo".

== History ==
Trollfest was formed in 2003 by John Espen Sagstad (Mr.Seidel) and Jostein Austvik (Trollmannen). Their first album Willkommen Folk Tell Drekka Fest!! was released in 2005, and the band followed up with the second album, Brakebein, in 2006.

During the first years, Trollfest never played live, and the first foray beyond the planning stage occurred in 2007 as one of the headlining bands at the Ninth Barther Metal Open Air Festival. TrollfesT then went on to headline and play various festivals and concerts around Europe during 2007–08, including the Ragnarök and Riedfest festivals. From October to November 2012, the band went on tour with Wintersun, Korpiklaani, Krampus and Varg for Heidenfest 2012 tour.

Trollfest's third studio album, Villanden, was published in January 2009. In 2011 Trollfest signed with NoiseArt Records, and later that year En Kvest For Den Hellige Gral, the band's fourth studio album, was released. Trollfest announced their new album, Brumlebassen, which came out 24 August 2012. The band's sixth studio album, Kaptein Kaos, was released in April 2014. Following the release of Kaptein Kaos, the band embarked on their first European headliner tour.

Their seventh studio album, Helluva was released in 2017.

On 10 January 2022, it was announced that TrollfesT is one of the acts competing in Melodi Grand Prix 2022 with the song "Dance Like a Pink Flamingo".

== Musical style ==
Most of Trollfest's lyrics are written in the fictional Trollspråk, which is a mixture of Norwegian and German. The band is also known for their use of saxophones and accordions in their songs. They describe their own music as Balkan metal.

== Band members ==
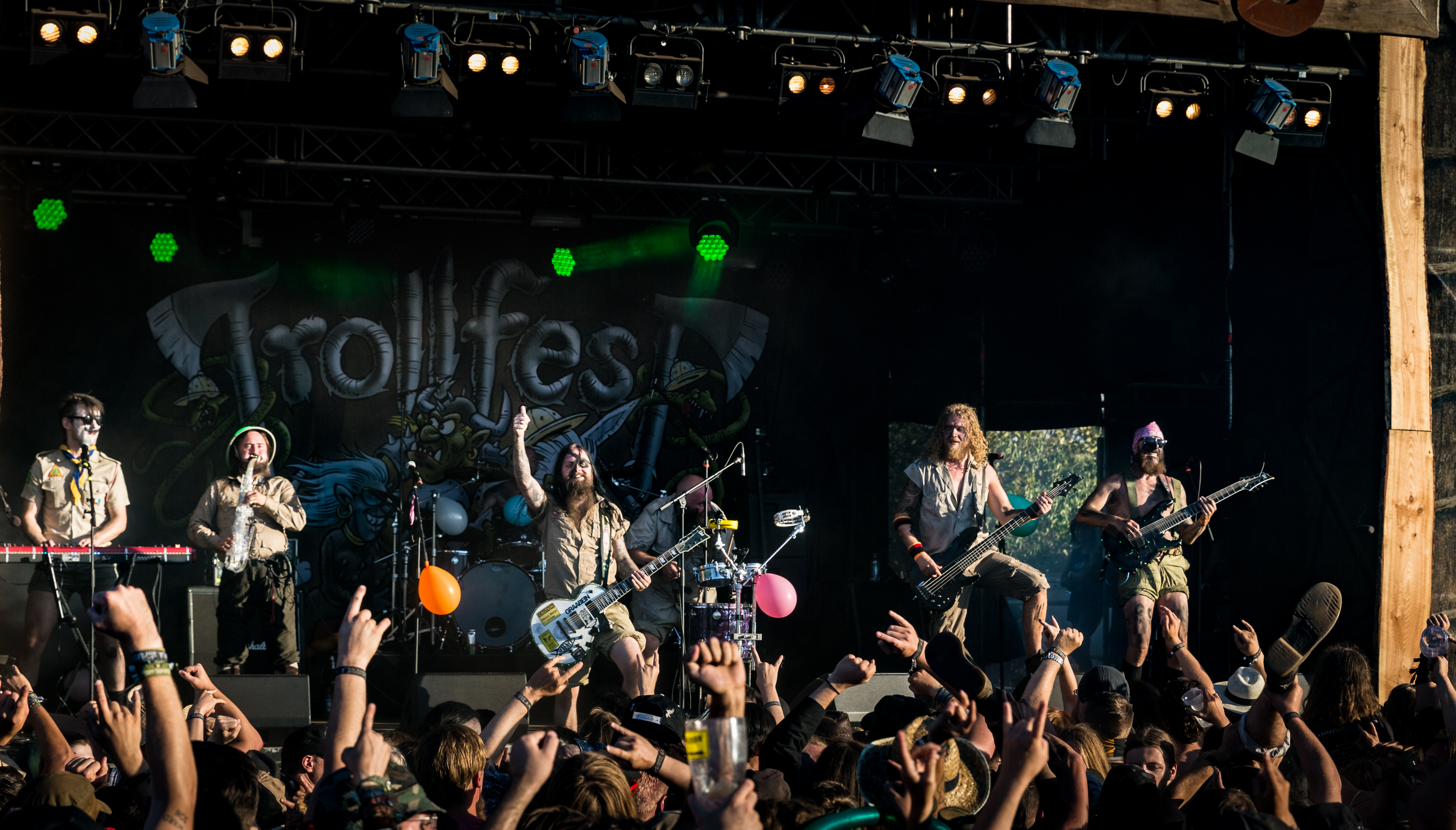
Trollfest at Wacken Open Air 2018

=== Current ===
- Jostein "Trollmannen" Austvik – vocals (2003–present)
- John "Mr. Seidel" Sagstad – guitars (2003–present)
- Eirik "Trollbank" Renton – drums, bouzouki (2003–present)
- Dag "Drekka Dag" Stiberg – saxophone (2011–present)
- Kai "Fjernkontrollet" Renton – accordion, keyboards (2017–present)
- Fabian "Fabio Grimdrap" Jiru – guitars (2019–present)
- Bjørn "Kjellkjé" Rønnow – drums (2019–present)
- Alexander "Böesse Basshöl" Bøe – bass (2022–present)

=== Former ===
- Martin "Psychotroll" Storm-Olsen – bass (2003–2012)
- Øyvind Manskow – accordion, banjo (2009–2015)
- Per Spelemann – guitars (2009–2012)
- Morten "Dr. Leif Kjønnsfleis" Müller – guitars, vocals (2011–2018)
- Tor "St. Beinhard" Rogn – guitars (2012)
- Øyvind "Lodd Bolt" Johannesen – bass (2012–2022)

== Discography ==
=== Studio albums ===
- Willkommen Folk Tell Drekka Fest! (2005)
- Brakebein (2006)
- Villanden (2009)
- En Kvest For Den Hellige Gral (2011)
- Brumlebassen (2012)
- Kaptein Kaos (2014)
- Helluva (2017)
- Norwegian Fairytales (2019)
- Flamingo Overlord (2022)
- Trollywood (2026)

=== EPs ===
- Uraltes Elemente (2009)
- Happy Heroes (2021)

=== Compilation albums ===
- A Decade of Drekkadence (2013)
- 20 Years in the Fast Lane (2024)

== Gallery ==
Trollfest at Rockharz Open Air 2018 in Germany

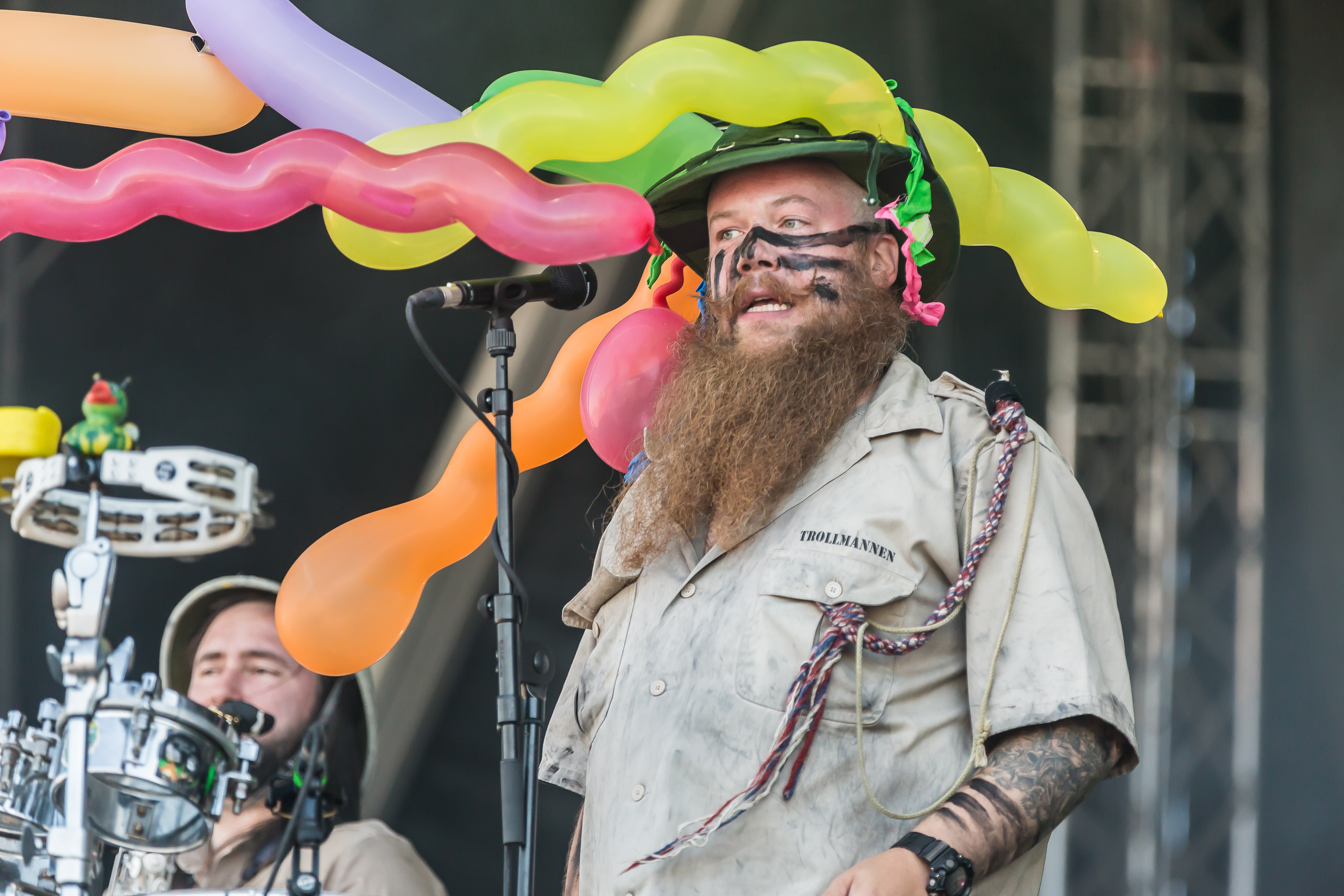
Singer Jostein "Trollmannen" Austvik

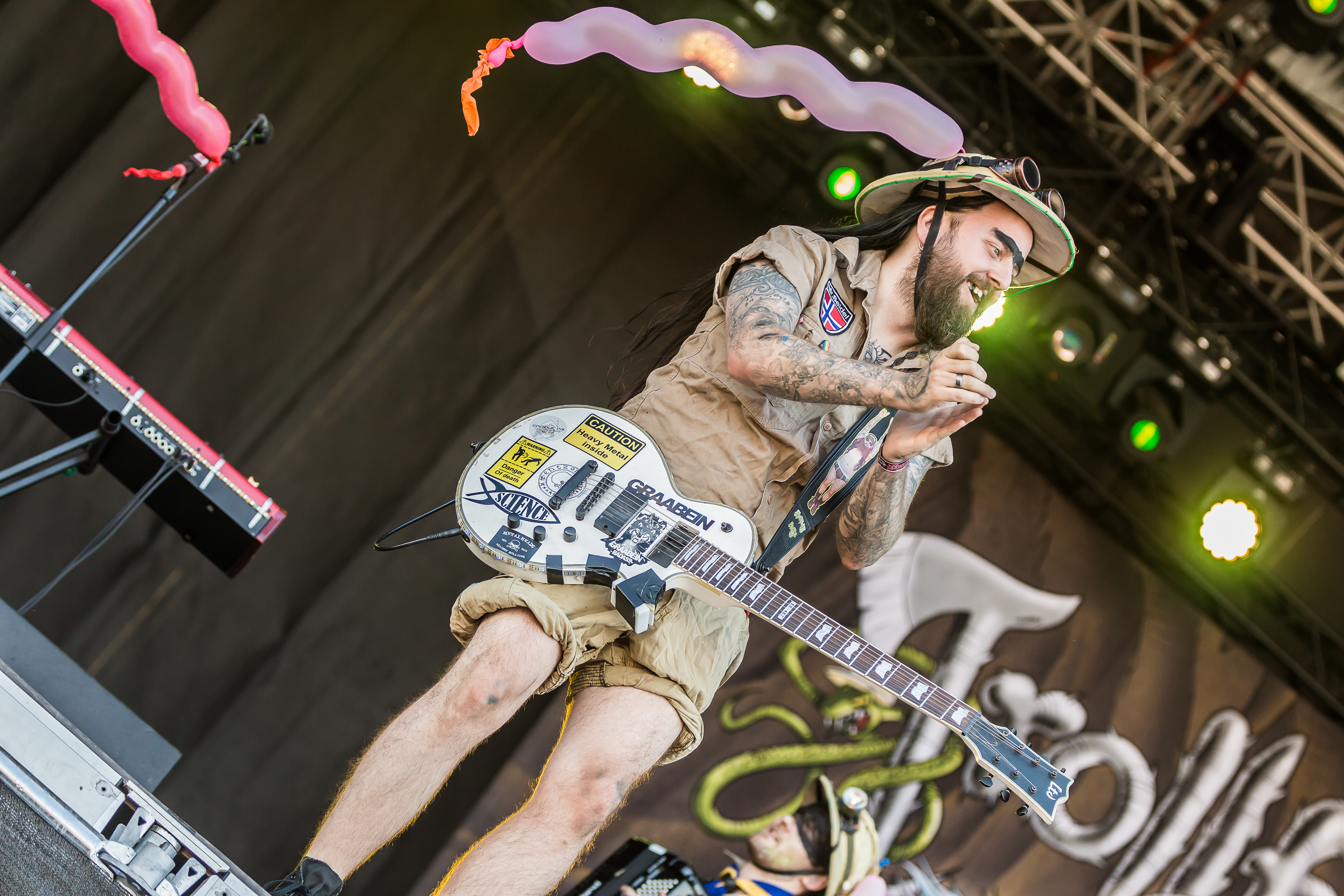
Guitarist John Espen "Mr.Seidel" Sagstad

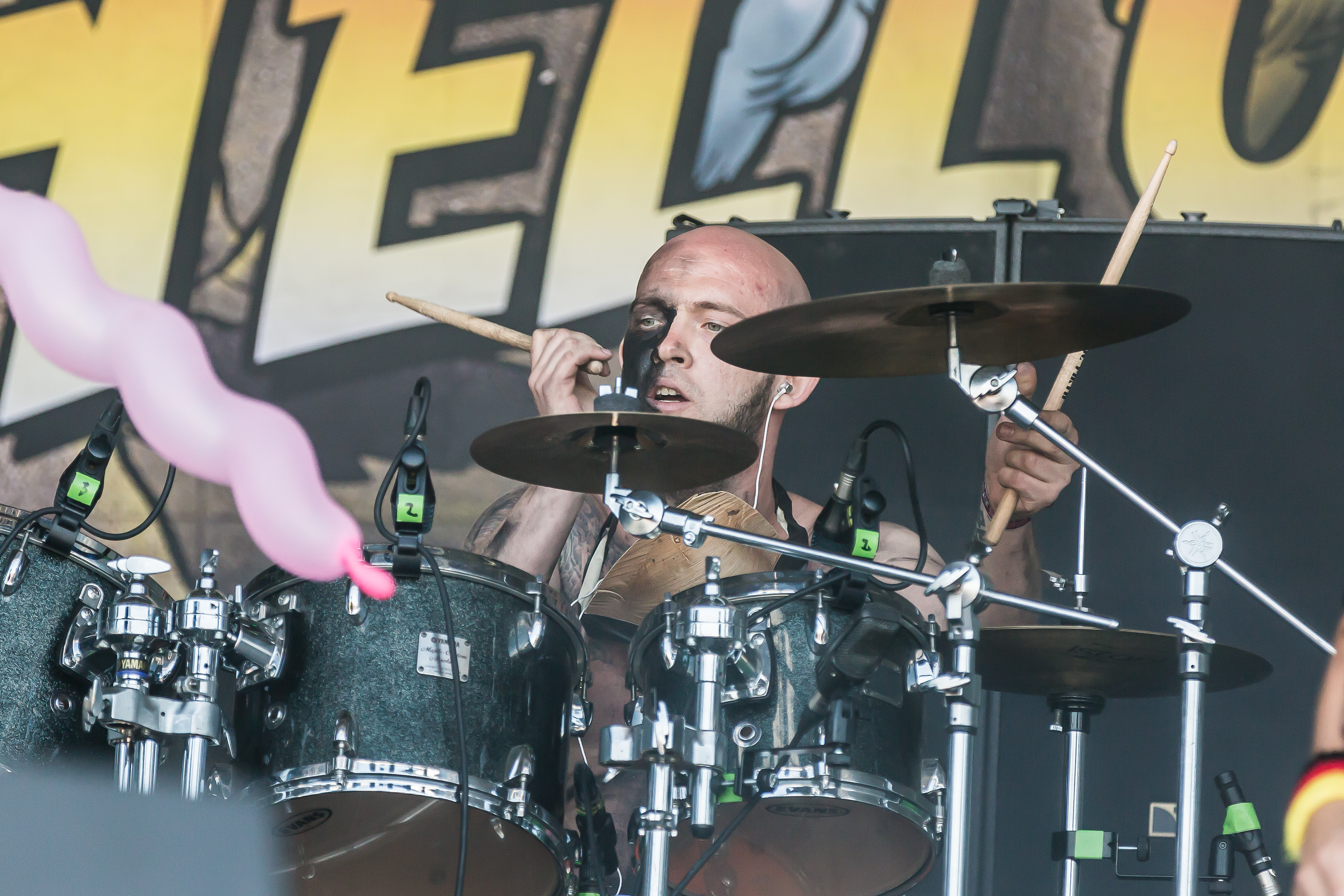
Drummer Bjørn Dugstad "Kjellkjé" Rønnow

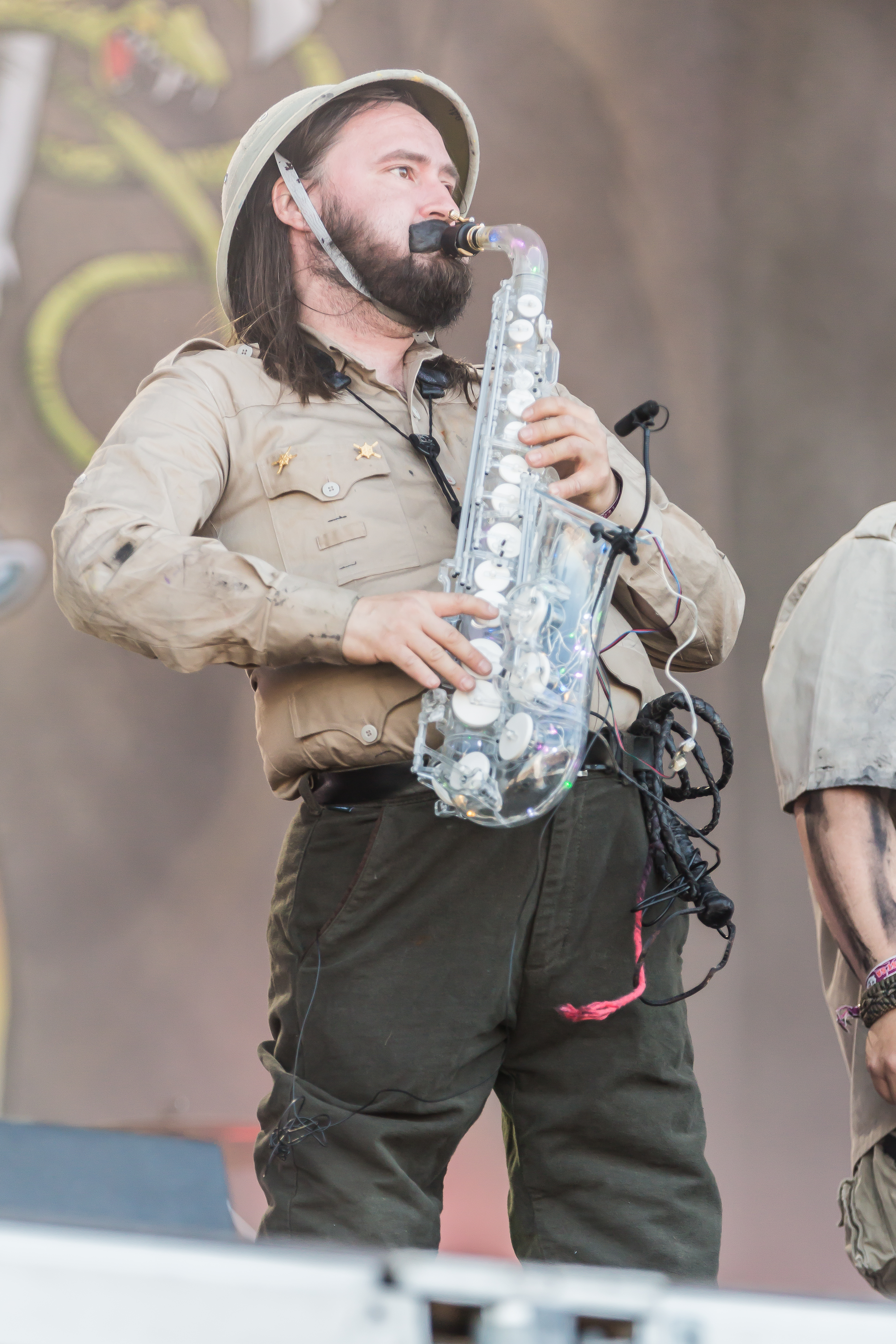
Saxophonist Dag "DrekkaDag" Stiberg

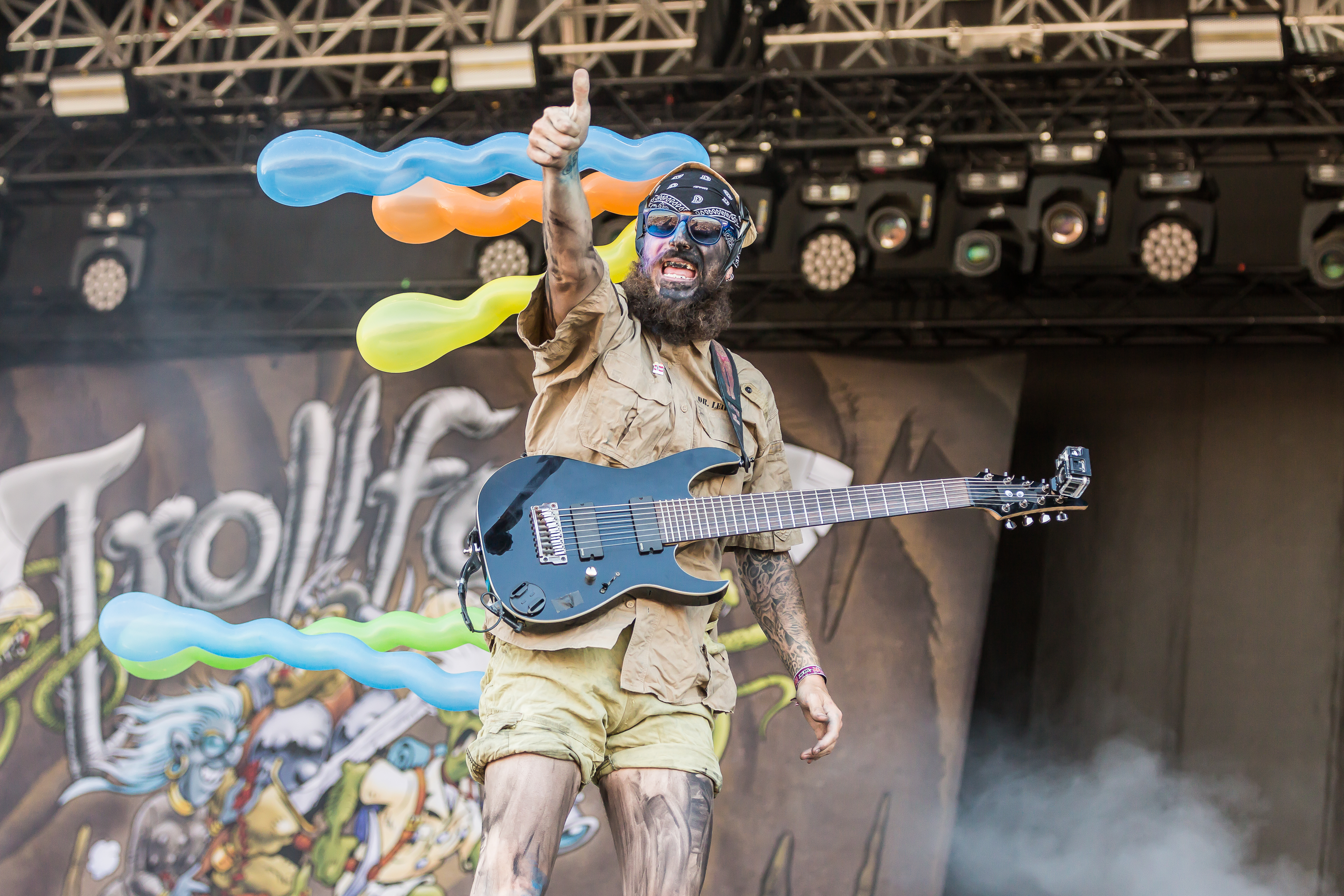
Guitarist Leif "Dr. Leif Kjønnsfleis" Kjønnsfleis

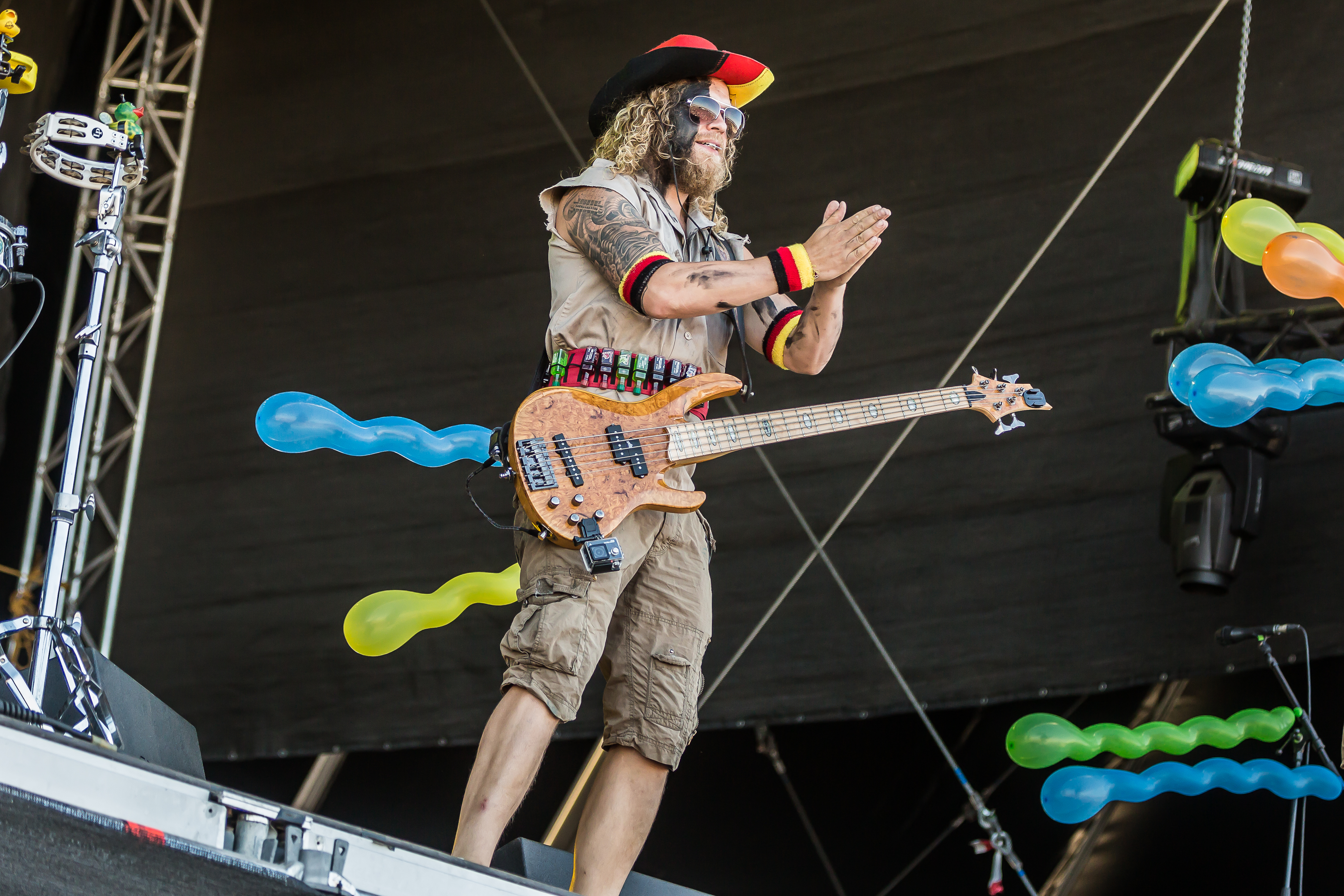
Bassist Øyvind Bolt Strönen "Lodd Bolt" Johannesen

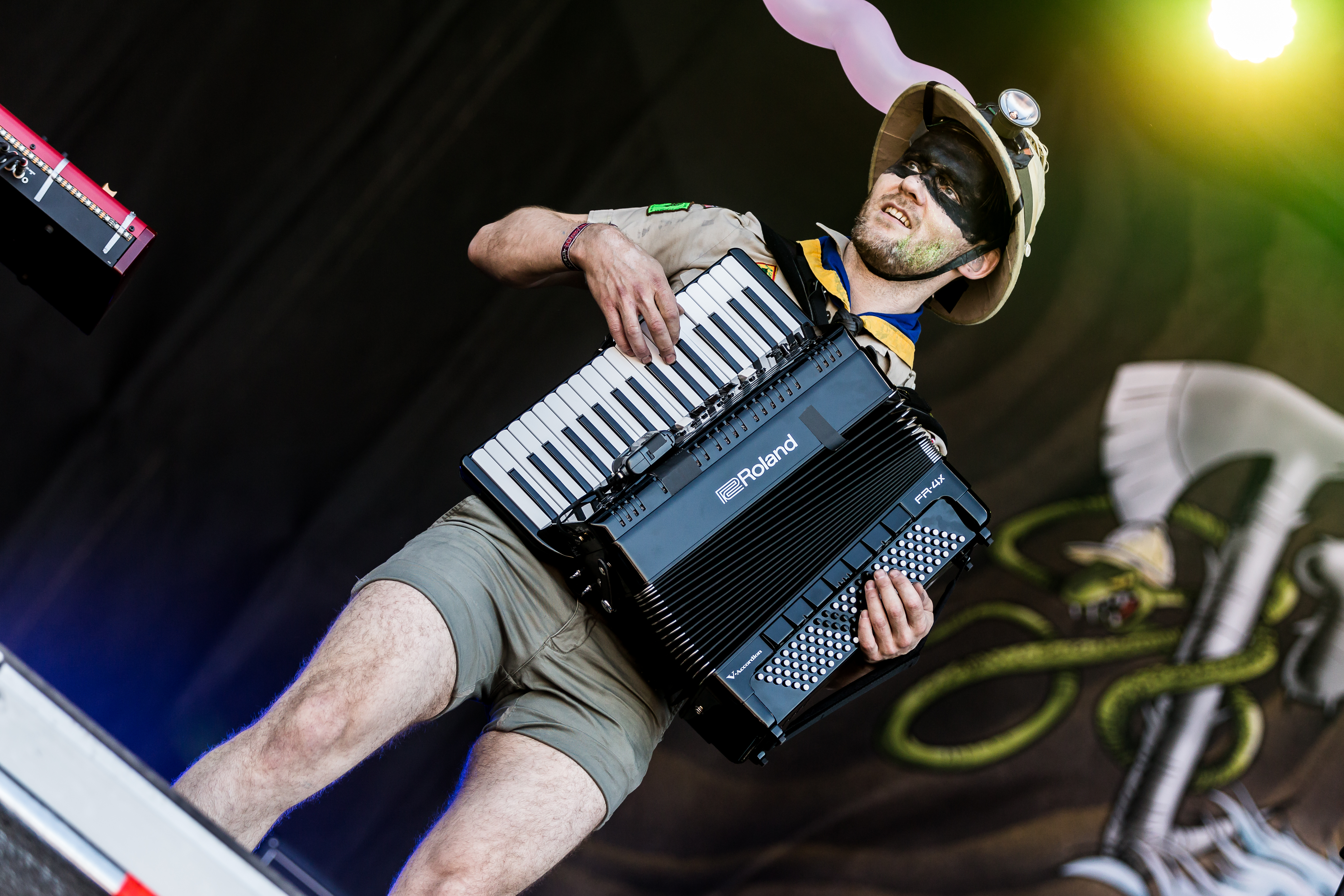
Accordionist Kai "Fjernkontrollet" Renton
