= Melodi Grand Prix 2022 =

60th edition of Melodi Grand Prix

Dates and venue
- Semi-final 1: 15 January 2022
- Semi-final 2: 22 January 2022
- Semi-final 3: 29 January 2022
- Semi-final 4: 5 February 2022
- Last chance: 7 February 2022 (part 1) 12 February 2022 (part 2)
- Final: 19 February 2022
- Venue: H3 Arena, Fornebu

Organisation
- Broadcaster: Norsk rikskringkasting (NRK)
- Presenters: Mikkel Niva; Kåre Magnus Bergh; Annika Momrak

Participants
- Number of entries: 21

Vote
- Winning song: "Give That Wolf a Banana" by Subwoolfer

Melodi Grand Prix 2022 was the 60th edition of the Norwegian music competition Melodi Grand Prix (MGP). The contest is held annually and serves as the country's preselection for the Eurovision Song Contest. MGP was organized by Norway's public broadcaster NRK and was held in January and February 2022. The winner of the competition, Subwoolfer with "Give That Wolf a Banana", went on to represent Norway in the Eurovision Song Contest 2022 in Turin, Italy in May 2022.

== Format ==
The contest consisted of four semi-finals, a two-part "wild card" round (Sistesjansen, "Last chance") and a final, held at the H3 Arena in Fornebu across January and February 2022. The concept is similar to the competition in 2021: one contestant qualified for the final from each of the previous rounds, while another five added up to these as pre-qualified entrants, for a total of ten finalists. In the final, two rounds of voting took place, narrowing down the competition to two contestants, and ultimately determining the winner.

In October 2021, Stig Karlsen, in charge of the organization of the event for NRK, announced the broadcaster was considering a few changes to the format, particularly to the voting system, which among other things might have returned to include an international jury vote for the final. This was ultimately ruled out.

In December 2021, it was announced that the show would be hosted by Mikkel Niva, Kåre Magnus Bergh, and Annika Momrak.

The semi-finals and the last chance round took place without an audience due to the COVID-19 pandemic in Norway, particularly due to the spread of the Omicron variant. The final was attended by an audience of 500 spectators.

== Competing entries ==
About one week after the Eurovision Song Contest 2021, NRK officially opened for songwriters to submit entries for Melodi Grand Prix 2022. The submission window was set to close on 15 August 2021, but was later extended to 15 September 2021.

The competition was open to all songwriters, and each songwriter could submit up to three songs. Each song should have had at least one Norwegian contributor, in order to "prioritize and promote the Norwegian music scene". In addition to the open submission, NRK also looked for possible entries through targeted search and direct dialogue with the Norwegian music industry.

In late November 2021, it was reported that 21 entries had been selected to take part in the contest. Originally, the lineup of participating artists was scheduled to be revealed on 6 January 2022, and their entries at a later time; however, it was later decided they would be announced together on 10 January.

Competing entries
Artist	Song	Composer(s)
Alexandra Joner	"Hasta la vista"	Henrik Sæter, Jazara Aden Hutton
Anna-Lisa Kumoji	"Queen Bees"	Olli Äkräs, Alan Roy Scott, Elsbeth Rehder, Anna-Lisa Kumoji
Christian Ingebrigtsen	"Wonder of the World"	Christian Ingebrigtsen, Michael Hunter Ochs, Henrik Tala
Daniel Lukas	"Kvelertak"	Daniel Lukas Kalelic, Are Næsset
Eline Noelia	"Ecstasy"	Eline Noelia Myreng, Audun Agnar Guldbrandsen, Tea Megaard
Elsie Bay	"Death of Us"	Elsa Søllesvik, Jonas Holteberg Jensen, Andreas Stone Johansson
Farida	"Dangerous"	Farida Bolseth Benounis, Rasmus Simon Vedvik Thallaug, Atle Pettersen, Peter Newman, Hannah Dorothy Bristow
Frode Vassel	"Black Flowers"	Frode Vassel, Benjamin Larsen, Niklas Rosström, Celine Alette Pedersen Breivoll
Kim Wigaard	"La melodia"	Kim Wigaard Johansen, Marius Hagen, Karianne Sissener Amundsen, Ronny Janssen
Lily Löwe	"Bad Baby"	Lill Sofie Wilsberg, Trond Holter, Victoria Land
Mari Bølla	"Your Loss"	Lars Horn Lavik, Morten Franck, Mari Eriksen Bølla
Maria Mohn	"Fly"	Maria Mohn, Einar Kristiansen Five
Mira Craig	"We Still Here"	Mira Craig, Bård Berg
NorthKid	"Someone"	Helge Moen, Alex Charles, Sandra Lyng, Jim Bergsted
Oda Gondrosen	"Hammer of Thor"	Morten Franck, Elsa Søllesvik, Torgeir Ryssevik, Oda Kristine Gondrosen
Sofie Fjellvang	"Made of Glass"	Sofie Fjellvang, Kjetil Mørland
Steffen Jakobsen	"With Me Tonight"	Mats William Wennerberg, Nicolai Herwell
Sturla	"Skår i hjerte"	Sturla Fagerli Larsen
Subwoolfer	"Give That Wolf a Banana"	Keith, Jim, DJ Astronaut
Trollfest	"Dance Like a Pink Flamingo"	Eirik Renton, Jostein Austvik
Vilde	"Titans"	Vilde Johannessen, Ben Adams, Sindre Timberlid Jenssen

== Semi-finals ==
=== Semi-final 1 ===
The first semi-final took place on 15 January 2022.

Semi-final 1: 15 January 2022
Duel	R/O	Artist	Song	Result
Duel 1	1	Eline Noelia	"Ecstasy"	Gold Duel
Duel 1	2	Mira Craig	"We Still Here"	Last chance
Duel 2	1	Trollfest	"Dance Like a Pink Flamingo"	Last chance
Duel 2	2	Frode Vassel	"Black Flowers"	Gold Duel
Promo	—N/a	Elsie Bay	"Death of Us"	Pre-qualified

Gold Duel: 15 January 2022
R/O	Artist	Song	Result
1	Eline Noelia	"Ecstasy"	Last chance
2	Frode Vassel	"Black Flowers"	Final

=== Semi-final 2 ===
The second semi-final took place on 22 January 2022.

Semi-final 2: 22 January 2022
Duel	R/O	Artist	Song	Result
Duel 1	1	Lily Löwe	"Bad Baby"	Last chance
Duel 1	2	Steffen Jakobsen	"With Me Tonight"	Gold Duel
Duel 2	1	Farida	"Dangerous"	Gold Duel
Duel 2	2	Daniel Lukas	"Kvelertak"	Last chance
Promo	—N/a	Christian Ingebrigtsen	"Wonder of the World"	Pre-qualified

Gold Duel: 22 January 2022
R/O	Artist	Song	Result
1	Steffen Jakobsen	"With Me Tonight"	Last chance
2	Farida	"Dangerous"	Final

=== Semi-final 3 ===
The third semi-final took place on 29 January 2022. Subwoolfer was originally slated to perform in this semi-final as a pre-qualified entrant, before testing positive for COVID-19. Instead, NorthKid, another pre-qualified entrant, performed in this semi-final.

Semi-final 3: 29 January 2022
Duel	R/O	Artist	Song	Result
Duel 1	1	Mari Bølla	"Your Loss"	Last chance
Duel 1	2	Oda Gondrosen	"Hammer of Thor"	Gold Duel
Duel 2	1	Sturla	"Skår i hjerte"	Last chance
Duel 2	2	Vilde	"Titans"	Gold Duel
Promo	—N/a	NorthKid	"Someone"	Pre-qualified

Gold Duel: 29 January 2022
R/O	Artist	Song	Result
1	Oda Gondrosen	"Hammer of Thor"	Final
2	Vilde	"Titans"	Last chance

=== Semi-final 4 ===
The fourth semi-final took place on 5 February 2022.

Semi-final 4: 5 February 2022
Duel	R/O	Artist	Song	Result
Duel 1	1	Maria Mohn	"Fly"	Gold Duel
Duel 1	2	Alexandra Joner	"Hasta la vista"	Last chance
Duel 2	1	Kim Wigaard	"La melodia"	Last chance
Duel 2	2	Sofie Fjellvang	"Made of Glass"	Gold Duel
Promo	—N/a	Subwoolfer	"Give That Wolf a Banana"	Pre-qualified

Gold Duel: 5 February 2022
R/O	Artist	Song	Result
1	Maria Mohn	"Fly"	Last chance
2	Sofie Fjellvang	"Made of Glass"	Final

== Last chance ==
The last chance round took place on two nights on 7 and 12 February 2022. On 7 February, NRK hosted a live broadcast where the public was able to vote on the 12 eliminated acts and assign four wildcards for the second chance semi-final on 12 February, where Maria Mohn with "Fly" ultimately went on to the final.

Last chance round 1: 7 February 2022
R/O	Artist	Song	Result
1	Mira Craig	"We Still Here"	—N/a
2	Trollfest	"Dance Like a Pink Flamingo"	Round 2
3	Eline Noelia	"Ecstasy"	—N/a
4	Lily Löwe	"Bad Baby"	—N/a
5	Daniel Lukas	"Kvelertak"	—N/a
6	Steffen Jakobsen	"With Me Tonight"	—N/a
7	Mari Bølla	"Your Loss"	Round 2
8	Sturla	"Skår i hjerte"	—N/a
9	Vilde	"Titans"	—N/a
10	Alexandra Joner	"Hasta la vista"	—N/a
11	Kim Wigaard	"La melodia"	Round 2
12	Maria Mohn	"Fly"	Round 2

Last chance round 2: 12 February 2022
R/O	Artist	Song	Result
1	Mari Bølla	"Your Loss"	—N/a
2	Kim Wigaard	"La melodia"	—N/a
3	Maria Mohn	"Fly"	Gold Duel
4	Trollfest	"Dance Like a Pink Flamingo"	Gold Duel
Promo	Anna-Lisa Kumoji	"Queen Bees"	Pre-qualified

Gold Duel: 12 February 2022
R/O	Artist	Song	Result
1	Maria Mohn	"Fly"	Final
2	Trollfest	"Dance Like a Pink Flamingo"	—N/a

== Final ==
The final took place on 19 February 2022.

Final: 19 February 2022
R/O	Artist	Song	Result
1	Oda Gondrosen	"Hammer of Thor"	—N/a
2	NorthKid	"Someone"	Gold Duel
3	Anna-Lisa Kumoji	"Queen Bees"	—N/a
4	Farida	"Dangerous"	—N/a
5	Sofie Fjellvang	"Made of Glass"	Top 4
6	Frode Vassel	"Black Flowers"	—N/a
7	Christian Ingebrigtsen	"Wonder of the World"	—N/a
8	Maria Mohn	"Fly"	—N/a
9	Subwoolfer	"Give That Wolf a Banana"	Gold Duel
10	Elsie Bay	"Death of Us"	Top 4

Gold Duel: 19 February 2022
R/O	Artist	Song	South		Central		North		West		East		Total		Place
R/O	Artist	Song	Votes	%	Votes	%	Votes	%	Votes	%	Votes	%	Votes	%	Place
1	NorthKid	"Someone"	28,095	43.44	40,288	47.22	79,548	73.47	57,369	41.12	106,923	37.84	312,223	45.89	2
2	Subwoolfer	"Give That Wolf a Banana"	36,576	56.56	45,038	52.78	28,731	26.53	82,146	58.88	175,615	62.16	368,106	54.11	1

== Ratings ==
Viewing figures by show
Show	Air date	Viewers (millions)	Share (%)	Ref.
Semi-final 1	15 January 2022	0.555	—N/a	
Semi-final 2	22 January 2022	0.574	—N/a	
Semi-final 3	29 January 2022	—N/a	—N/a	
Semi-final 4	5 February 2022	0.533	—N/a	
Last chance round 1	7 February 2022	—N/a	—N/a	
Last chance round 2	12 February 2022	0.437	—N/a	
Final	19 February 2022	0.737	—N/a	

== See also ==
- Norway in the Eurovision Song Contest
- Eurovision Song Contest 2022
