= Give That Wolf a Banana =

2022 single by Subwoolfer

Single by Subwoolfer
- Language: English
- Released: 10 January 2022
- Length: 2:52
- Label: Universal
- Songwriters: DJ Astronaut; Jim; Keith
- Producers: Keith; Jim; DJ Astronaut

Subwoolfer singles chronology
"Give That Wolf a Banana" (2022)	"Melocoton (The Donka Donk Song)" (2022)

Music video
- "Give That Wolf a Banana" on YouTube

Eurovision Song Contest 2022 entry
- Country: Norway
- Artists: Subwoolfer (Ben Adams and Gaute Ormasen)
- Language: English

Finals performance
- Semi-final result: 6th
- Semi-final points: 177
- Final result: 10th
- Final points: 182

Entry chronology
- ◄ "Fallen Angel" (2021)
- "Queen of Kings" (2023) ►

"Give That Wolf a Banana" is the debut song by British-Norwegian pop duo Subwoolfer, released as a single on 10 January 2022. It represented Norway in the Eurovision Song Contest 2022 in Turin, Italy after winning Melodi Grand Prix 2022, Norway's national final. The single reached number four in Norway.

== Eurovision Song Contest ==
=== Melodi Grand Prix 2022 ===
About one week after the Eurovision Song Contest 2021, NRK officially opened for songwriters to submit entries for Melodi Grand Prix 2022. The submission window was set to close on 15 August 2021, but was later extended to 15 September 2021. The competition was open to all songwriters, and each songwriter could submit up to three songs. Each song should have had at least one Norwegian contributor, in order to "prioritize and promote the Norwegian music scene". In addition to the open submission, NRK also looked for possible entries through targeted search and direct dialogue with the Norwegian music industry. In late November 2021, it was reported that 21 entries had been selected to take part in the contest. Originally, the lineup of participating artists was scheduled to be revealed on 6 January 2022, and their entries at a later time; however, it was later decided they would be announced together on 10 January.

The song would be one of five pre-qualified entrants to be in the final. The final would take place on 19 February 2022. The song would move on to the Gold Final, along with three others. The song would make it into the top two to move on to the Gold Duel. The song would eventually win the Gold Duel, and as a result, represented Norway in the Eurovision Song Contest 2022.

=== At Eurovision ===
According to Eurovision rules, all nations with the exceptions of the country that won the previous year's Eurovision (usually the host country, with a few exceptions) and the "Big Five" (France, Germany, Italy, Spain and the United Kingdom) are required to qualify from one of two semi-finals in order to compete for the final; the top ten countries from each semi-final progress to the final. The European Broadcasting Union (EBU) split up the competing countries into six different pots based on voting patterns from previous contests, with countries with favourable voting histories put into the same pot. On 25 January 2022, an allocation draw was held which placed each country in one of the two semi-finals, as well as which half of the show they would perform in. Norway was placed in the first semi-final, held on 10 May 2022, and performed in the second half of the show. After qualifying to the finals held on the 14 May 2022, they performed in spot 7 and went on to achieve 10th place with a total of 182 points.

== Valentine's edition ==
On 11 February 2022, Subwoolfer released a Valentine's Day version of "Give That Wolf a Banana", titled "Give That Wolf a Romantic Banana".

== Charts ==
Chart performance for "Give That Wolf a Banana"
Chart (2022)	Peak position
Australia Digital Tracks (ARIA)	33
Austria (Ö3 Austria Top 40)	67
Global Excl. US (Billboard)	165
Greece International (IFPI Greece)	35
Iceland (Tónlistinn)	3
Ireland (IRMA)	59
Lithuania (AGATA)	10
Netherlands (Single Top 100)	54
Norway (VG-lista)	4
Sweden (Sverigetopplistan)	13
UK Singles (Official Charts)	47

== Certifications ==
Certifications for "Give That Wolf a Banana"
Region	Certification	Certified units/sales
Norway (IFPI Norway)	Platinum	60,000^{‡}
^{‡} Sales+streaming figures based on certification alone.

== See also ==
- The Fox (What Does the Fox Say?)
