= Norway in the Eurovision Song Contest 2022 =

- Eurovision Song Contest 2022
- Participating broadcaster: Norsk rikskringkasting (NRK)
- Country: Norway
- Selection process: Melodi Grand Prix 2022
- Selection date: 19 February 2022

Competing entry
- Song: "Give That Wolf a Banana"
- Artist: Subwoolfer
- Songwriters: Ben Adams (Keith); Gaute Ormåsen (Jim); DJ Astronaut

Placement
- Semi-final result: Qualified (6th, 177 points)
- Final result: 10th, 182 points

Participation chronology

Norway was represented at the Eurovision Song Contest 2022 in Turin, Italy with "Give That Wolf a Banana" performed by Subwoolfer. The Norwegian broadcaster Norsk rikskringkasting (NRK) organised the national final Melodi Grand Prix 2022 in order to select the Norwegian entry for the 2022 contest. 21 entries were selected to compete in the national final, which consists of seven shows: four semi-finals, two last chance round shows and a final. Ten entries ultimately qualified to compete in the final that took place on 19 February 2022 and the winner was determined over two rounds of voting.

== Background ==
Prior to the 2022 contest, Norway has participated in the Eurovision Song Contest sixty times since its first entry in 1960. Norway has won the contest on three occasions: in 1985 with the song "La det swinge" performed by Bobbysocks!, in 1995 with the song "Nocturne" performed by Secret Garden and in 2009 with the song "Fairytale" performed by Alexander Rybak. Norway also has the two dubious distinctions of having finished last in the Eurovision final more than any other country and for having the most nul points (zero points) in the contest, the latter being a record the nation shared together with Austria. The country has finished last eleven times and has failed to score a point in four contests. Following the introduction of semi-finals for 2004, Norway has finished in the top ten eight times. In 2021, "Fallen Angel", performed by Tix, qualified for the final and was placed eighteenth.

The Norwegian national broadcaster, Norsk rikskringkasting (NRK), broadcasts the event within Norway and organises the selection process for the nation's entry. NRK confirmed their intentions to participate at the 2022 Eurovision Song Contest on 28 May 2021. The broadcaster has traditionally organised the national final Melodi Grand Prix, which has selected the Norwegian entry for the Eurovision Song Contest in all but one of their participations. Along with their participation confirmation, the broadcaster revealed details regarding their selection procedure and announced the organization of Melodi Grand Prix 2022 in order to select the 2022 Norwegian entry.

== Before Eurovision ==
=== Melodi Grand Prix 2022 ===
Melodi Grand Prix 2022 was the 60th edition of the Norwegian national final Melodi Grand Prix which selected Norway's entry for the 2022 contest. The competition took place at the H3 Arena in Fornebu and consists of four semi-finals between 15 January and 5 February, two last chance round shows on 7 and 12 February, and a final on 19 February. The seven shows were hosted by Mikkel Niva, Kåre Magnus Bergh, and Annika Momrak. The national final was televised on NRK1 and NRK TV as well as streamed online at NRK's official website nrk.no.

==== Semi-finals and last chance round ====
- The first semi-final took place on 15 January 2022. "Black Flowers" performed by Frode Vassel qualified to the final.
- The second semi-final took place on 22 January 2022. "Dangerous" performed by Farida qualified to the final.
- The third semi-final took place on 29 January 2022. "Hammer of Thor" performed by Oda Gondrosen qualified to the final.
- The fourth semi-final took place on 5 February 2022. "Made of Glass" performed by Sofie Fjellvang qualified to the final.
- The last chance round (Sistesjansen) took place over two shows on 7 and 12 February 2022. "Fly" performed by Maria Mohn qualified to the final.

==== Final ====
Ten songs consisting of the four semi-final and last chance qualifiers alongside five pre-qualified songs competed during the final on 19 February 2022. The winner was selected over two rounds of voting, with the four-way Gold Final being dropped for the first time since 2015.

Final – 19 February 2022
R/O	Artist	Song	Result
1	Oda Gondrosen	"Hammer of Thor"	—N/a
2	NorthKid	"Someone"	Gold Duel
3	Anna-Lisa Kumoji	"Queen Bees"	—N/a
4	Farida	"Dangerous"	—N/a
5	Sofie Fjellvang	"Made of Glass"	Top 4
6	Frode Vassel	"Black Flowers"	—N/a
7	Christian Ingebrigtsen	"Wonder of the World"	—N/a
8	Maria Mohn	"Fly"	—N/a
9	Subwoolfer	"Give That Wolf a Banana"	Gold Duel
10	Elsie Bay	"Death of Us"	Top 4

Gold Duel – 19 February 2022
R/O	Artist	Song	Votes	Place
1	NorthKid	"Someone"	312,223	2
2	Subwoolfer	"Give That Wolf a Banana"	368,106	1

== At Eurovision ==
According to Eurovision rules, all nations with the exceptions of the host country and the "Big Five" (France, Germany, Italy, Spain and the United Kingdom) are required to qualify from one of two semi-finals in order to compete for the final; the top ten countries from each semi-final progress to the final. The European Broadcasting Union (EBU) split up the competing countries into six different pots based on voting patterns from previous contests, with countries with favourable voting histories put into the same pot. On 25 January 2022, an allocation draw was held which placed each country into one of the two semi-finals, as well as which half of the show they would perform in. Norway has been placed into the first semi-final, to be held on 10 May 2022, and has been scheduled to perform in the second half of the show.

=== Semi-final ===
Once all the competing songs for the 2022 contest had been released, the running order for the semi-finals was decided by the shows' producers rather than through another draw, so that similar songs were not placed next to each other. Norway was set to perform in position 16, following the entry from Greece and before the entry from Armenia.

At the end of the show, Norway was announced as a qualifier for the final.

=== Voting ===
==== Points awarded to Norway ====
Points awarded to Norway (Semi-final 1)
Score	Televote	Jury
12 points		Iceland
10 points	Denmark; Iceland; Moldova	
8 points		
7 points	Austria; Croatia; Greece; Latvia; Netherlands; Portugal; Ukraine	Bulgaria; Latvia; Moldova; Switzerland
6 points		Armenia; Netherlands
5 points	Italy; Lithuania	
4 points	Bulgaria; Slovenia	Austria
3 points	Armenia	Denmark; France; Lithuania
2 points	Albania; France	Albania; Portugal; Slovenia
1 point		Greece; Ukraine

Points awarded to Norway (Final)
Score	Televote	Jury
12 points		
10 points	Australia; Iceland; Sweden	
8 points	Denmark; Serbia	Iceland
7 points	Azerbaijan	
6 points	Finland; Greece; Moldova; United Kingdom	
5 points	Austria; Croatia; Latvia; Netherlands	Austria; Latvia
4 points	Estonia; Ireland; Israel; Italy; Malta; Poland	Finland
3 points	Czech Republic; Slovenia; Spain	Germany; Netherlands; Sweden
2 points	Lithuania; Montenegro; North Macedonia; Portugal; Romania; San Marino; Ukraine	Bulgaria; Czech Republic
1 point	Bulgaria; Germany	Switzerland

==== Points awarded by Norway ====
Points awarded by Norway (Semi-final 1)
Score	Televote	Jury
12 points	Greece	Greece
10 points	Ukraine	Portugal
8 points	Lithuania	Netherlands
7 points	Iceland	Armenia
6 points	Moldova	Ukraine
5 points	Armenia	Lithuania
4 points	Denmark	Switzerland
3 points	Austria	Denmark
2 points	Portugal	Iceland
1 point	Netherlands	Moldova

Points awarded by Norway (Final)
Score	Televote	Jury
12 points	Ukraine	Greece
10 points	Lithuania	Portugal
8 points	Sweden	Sweden
7 points	Greece	Spain
6 points	United Kingdom	United Kingdom
5 points	Poland	Netherlands
4 points	Moldova	Armenia
3 points	Serbia	Ukraine
2 points	Estonia	Lithuania
1 point	Spain	Switzerland

==== Detailed voting results ====
The following members comprised the Norwegian jury:

- Jowst – Music producer, songwriter, represented Norway in the Eurovision Song Contest 2017
- Mari Bølla – Singer, musician
- Mats Borch Bugge – Music editor-in-chief
- Royane – Singer
- Trine Rein – Singer, songwriter

Detailed voting results from Norway (Semi-final 1)
R/O	Country	Jury							Televote	
R/O	Country	Juror 1	Juror 2	Juror 3	Juror 4	Juror 5	Rank	Points	Rank	Points
01	Albania	12	7	15	15	13	13		13	
02	Latvia	13	11	9	16	9	12		12	
03	Lithuania	4	2	14	10	8	6	5	3	8
04	Switzerland	16	8	4	6	4	7	4	11	
05	Slovenia	15	12	8	13	12	14		16	
06	Ukraine	2	3	3	9	10	5	6	2	10
07	Bulgaria	9	14	16	12	15	16		15	
08	Netherlands	5	4	2	4	2	3	8	10	1
09	Moldova	8	13	6	8	16	10	1	5	6
10	Portugal	6	1	7	3	1	2	10	9	2
11	Croatia	11	16	11	14	11	15		14	
12	Denmark	3	10	10	5	7	8	3	7	4
13	Austria	7	15	12	11	14	11		8	3
14	Iceland	14	9	13	7	6	9	2	4	7
15	Greece	1	6	1	2	5	1	12	1	12
16	Norway									
17	Armenia	10	5	5	1	3	4	7	6	5

Detailed voting results from Norway (Final)
R/O	Country	Jury							Televote	
R/O	Country	Juror 1	Juror 2	Juror 3	Juror 4	Juror 5	Rank	Points	Rank	Points
01	Czech Republic	7	14	9	16	13	12		11	
02	Romania	22	15	21	17	11	19		19	
03	Portugal	3	5	1	2	2	2	10	20	
04	Finland	21	24	23	23	20	24		17	
05	Switzerland	9	12	16	9	7	10	1	13	
06	France	12	20	7	20	14	14		14	
07	Norway									
08	Armenia	14	21	10	4	4	7	4	15	
09	Italy	16	13	12	18	17	17		23	
10	Spain	6	2	2	5	8	4	7	10	1
11	Netherlands	8	9	13	8	3	6	5	16	
12	Ukraine	4	6	11	13	22	8	3	1	12
13	Germany	15	23	22	19	12	21		18	
14	Lithuania	19	7	6	10	21	9	2	2	10
15	Azerbaijan	18	8	15	22	18	16		24	
16	Belgium	20	22	14	12	16	18		22	
17	Greece	1	1	3	1	1	1	12	4	7
18	Iceland	24	16	19	14	15	22		12	
19	Moldova	10	19	20	21	23	20		7	4
20	Sweden	5	3	4	3	5	3	8	3	8
21	Australia	11	11	17	7	19	13		21	
22	United Kingdom	2	4	5	6	9	5	6	5	6
23	Poland	13	17	18	11	10	15		6	5
24	Serbia	23	10	24	24	24	23		8	3
25	Estonia	17	18	8	15	6	11		9	2
