= Martin Alfsen =

Norwegian musician, choir conductor

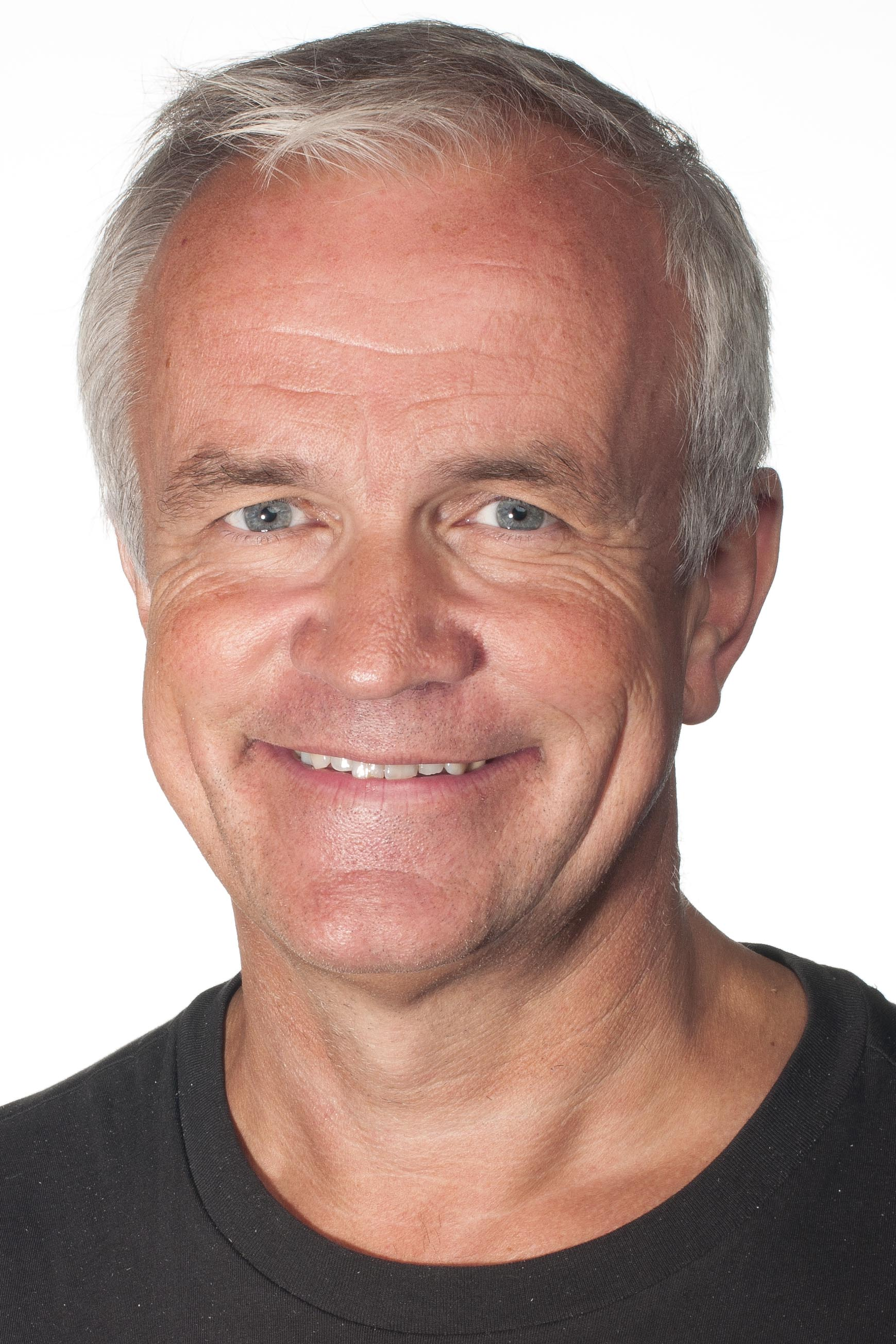
Martin Alfsen, 2010

Martin Alfsen (born 4 January 1959) is a musician, producer, songwriter and choir director.

== Biography ==
After serving in the military as a trombonist in the Band of the King's Guard, Alfsen entered the Conservatory of Music in Oslo. During his student years he had directed the Reflex Choir in the church he and his family attended in Oslo. In 1985, the Reflex Choir made their national breakthrough with the album "REFLEX". In the late eighties and early nineties, Alfsen began composing and producing for Master Music, Norway's leading company in contemporary Christian music. His albums with Reflex were important contributions to the repertoire of Christian choirs and music groups throughout Scandinavia.

In 1993, Reflex recorded the Alfsen song "Like a Mighty River" on the Denne Dagen album. The song became a Christian music hit, and was covered by a number of European choirs and the American gospel group The Kurt Carr Singers, for their album Serious About It.

In the mid-nineties, Alfsen was the musical director for a popular Norwegian TV series presenting well-known traditional Christian songs and church hymns. The TV series resulted in a series of bestselling albums, produced by Alfsen for the Master Music label.

With more than 300 songs recorded, touring with his Reflex Choir in Europe, and radio and TV performances, Alfsen has become of one of Scandinavia's most performed songwriters in Christian music. As a producer and arranger, he has been involved in more than fifty albums, including releases with international artists like Andrae Crouch, Richard Smallwood and Adrian Snell, as well as domestically known artists. Among them are female vocalist Hanne Krogh, sax player Arild Stav, actress and singer Inger Lise Rypdal, singer Rita Eriksen, singer Trine Rein, singer Gaute Ormåsen and trumpet ace Finn Eriksen.

In 2019, Martin Alfsen celebrated his 60th anniversary and published his autobiography Dirigenten - musikalske og mindre musikalske minner with Hermon Forlag. 2019 also brought a CD and DVD release, A Gospel Celebration, with Reflex, The YMCA Oslo Community Choir, Fredrikstad Gospelkor, Kor-90 and the American gospel singer Ingrid Arthur.

In 2021, he was commissioned to write a choir cantata for the celebration of the 250th anniversary of Hans Nielsen Hauge, the Norwegian preacher and politician. In 2023, his choir Reflex celebrated their 50th anniversary with a new album; "Jubilation" and a televised anniversary concert.

== Works ==
Musical works

- Praise and Worship mass "Liv" (1995)
- Cantata on Biblical Psalms "Sela" (1997)
- Passion "7 days in Jerusalem", for double choir, soloistis and band (2000)
- Millennium Cantata "Logos" for choir, soloists and symphony orchestra (with Jens Wendelboe) (2000)
- Mass based on Negro Spirituals "Shout All Over God's Heaven" for choir and jazz band (2004)
- Gospel cantata "The River", for choir, soloists and band (2006)
- "Song of Freedom", a choral work celebrating Nelson Mandela (with Arne Hiorth) (2014)
- "Stjerneskinn", a mass for Advent (2015)
- "Norsk Jul" Martin Alfsen & Reflex (2020)

Books

- Jesus i musikken (2002)
- Jazz-Gospel-Soul-Pop KOR (2007)
- Låtskriverhåndboka (2010)
- Dirigenten - musikalske og mindre musikalske minner (2019)
