= Robin og Bugge =

Norwegian Pop and Rap

- Origin: Norway
- Genres: Pop / Rap
- Years active: 2005-present
- Labels: Sony Music Norway
- Members: Robin Sharma; Thomas Bugge
- Website: www.robinogbugge.no

Robin og Bugge ('Robin and Bugge') is a Norwegian pop and rap duo composed of Robin Sharma and Thomas Bugge - the former originating from Manglerud, the latter Abildsø - both neighborhoods of Oslo, Norway.

Robin and Thomas formed the duo in 2005 in order to enter, and eventually win, a local talent contest with their original song "Smil" In 2009, Robin og Bugge released their first studio single, "Popish", to limited popularity and critical acclaim. A number of more successful singles followed: "Backpacker"; featuring Norwegian rapper and pop artist Katastrofe, "Overlegen", "Elak Elak", "Bongo Drum"; featuring Norwegian pop artist Freddy Genius (now Freddy Kalas), "Verdensrekord"; featuring Norwegian EDM artist B.B.M, and "Non Stop". The group also released "Monster"; notable for its feature of Norwegian singer Christina Skaar performing in English. In March 2014, they released their debut album Elak, which included three prior releases and six originals. In 2014 "Elak Elak" was selected via popular vote to be played on the bells of the Oslo Council House, every day for half a year. In 2014 - 2017, Robin og Bugge released several singles - "Fedrelandet"; featuring noted Norwegian singer Gaute Ormåsen, "Best når jeg er full", "Fuck You", "Gal"; featuring Norwegian pop singer Morgan Sulele.

In 2017, the duo released the single "Stormvind", featuring 6 am, their new producer and primary support artist when touring. They released another single that year, "Saganatt"; featuring Ormåsen. In 2018, they released their latest single, "Jeg hater mine venner"

They are signed to Sony Music Norway.

== Influences and style ==
Robin og Bugge's music is primarily inspired by 'Russemusik' ("graduation music"), a genre of Norwegian pop, hip-hop, and rap music catering to the club and party scene. However, the duo has experimented with various styles and genres over the course of their career. Their 2012 single "Overlegen" incorporates basic pop-rock staples and more acoustic instruments, "Gal" and "Stormvind" incorporate various atypical percussion sounds.

Thematically, Robin og Bugge have occasionally deviated from the more "generic" lyrics of, for example, "Elak Elak" - "Fedrelandet" includes references to Norwegian patriotism, in particular that of the WWII-era, while "Konspirasjoner og demoner" discusses the religious and social experiences of immigrant and young adult life.

== Personal lives ==
Robin Sharma is a second-generation Indian immigrant to Norway. Both Robin and Thomas grew up in relatively deprived neighbourhoods of Oslo's East Side, which has influenced their musical style and social attitudes. Since August 2018, Robin Sharma has been in a relationship with Norwegian university student Rebecca Svensden.

Both members of the duo are colleagues, associates, and good friends of fellow Norwegian artists Freddy Kalas, Katastrofe, Gaute Ormåsen, Morgan Sulele, and Staysmann og Lazz.

== Discography ==
=== Albums ===
- 2014: Elak

=== Singles ===
- 2005: "Smil"
- 2009: "Popish"
- 2010: "Hip Hop Rockstar"
- 2011: "Monster" feat. Christina Skaar
- 2012: "Backpacker" feat. Katastrofe
- 2012: "Overlegen"
- 2013: "Elak Elak"
- 2013: "Bongo Drum" feat. Freddy Genius
- 2014: "Verdensrekord"
- 2014: "Non Stop"
- 2015: "Best når jeg er full"
- 2015: "Fedrelandet" feat. Gaute Ormåsen
- 2016: "Gal" feat. Morgan Sulele
- 2017: "Stormvind" feat. 6AM
- 2017: "Saganatt" feat. Gaute Ormåsen
- 2018: "Jeg hater mine venner"
