= Brakebein =

Studio album by Trollfest
- Released: May 24, 2006
- Genre: Folk metal

Brakebein, is the second full-length album by Norwegian folk metal band, Trollfest. It was released on May 24, 2006. The album is a concept album based on a search for the 'Legendary Beer'.

== Track listing ==
1. Legendarisk Øl - 3:13
2. Brakebein - 3:11
3. Utmarschen - 3:39
4. Piratkriegen - 4:03
5. Den Apne Sjø - 3:49
6. Das Meerungeheuer - 3:54
7. Essenfest - 3:30
8. Inni Den Grotte - 2:24
9. Illantergesteignungh - 3:32
10. Prestefeste - 4:03
11. Yameeka - 2:07
12. Skogsgjensyn - 3:26
13. Egen Mjød, Heidunder Mjød! - 4:57

== Storyline ==
The whole Story is based on a few Trolls who leave their forest in order to search for the legendary Beer.

=== Legendarisk Øl (The Legendary Beer) ===
The Trolls are sitting in their forest and enjoy their Beer.

=== Brakebein ===
The song is about the Troll Brakebein who once heard a story about the Legendarisk Øl. He wants to find and taste it.

=== Utmarschen (Marching out) ===
Brakebein managed to convince the other Trolls to find the Legendary Beer. So they leave their forest and finally reach the coastal town of the pirate Busken. As Busken has many ships, the Trolls decide to attack him.

=== Piratkriegen (The Pirate War) ===
The Trolls attack and defeat Busken and take his biggest ship.

=== Den Åpne Sjø (The Big Ocean) ===
The Trolls sail on the ocean and still celebrate their defeat over Busken. They plunder every ship they see and soon everyone is scared of the infamous Trolls. Later the Trolls meet Thor Heyerdal on a little float. Brakebein commands him to tell everything about the Legendarisk Øl. Heyerdal claims not to know anything about it which makes Brakebein very angry.

=== Das MeerUngeheuer (The Sea Monster) ===
There is a huge Sea Monster. The Monster is bigger than every ship and eats anything that moves. Brakebein is lying in his bed and hears nothing, which is very uncommon for a ship full of trolls. So he goes out and sees the Sea Monster eating one of the Trolls. Brakebein and his friends beat the Monster and prepare the celebration of their victory.

=== Essenfest (Eating party) ===
The Trolls celebrate the victory over the Sea Monster and eat it.

=== Inni den Grotte (Inside the Cave) ===
Brakebein spots an Island. The Trolls don't know how to stop the ship and so it hits the coast. Brakebein goes straight into the forest in order to find some Beer, the other Trolls search food at the beach.

=== PresteFeste (Priest Party) ===
Brakebein returns from the Forest. He did not find any Beer, but captured two Priests. After having barbecued them, the Trolls leave the island again, still looking for the legendary beer.

=== Yameeka ===
The Trolls find another island where the people smoke a peace pipe. The Trolls have much fun with them but Brakebein tires and decides to continue the search for the legendary Beer.

=== Skogsgjensyn (Returning to the Forest) ===
The Trolls don't feel like searching the legendary Beer anymore and convince Brakebein to return home.
