= Ben Adams =

British musical artist (born 1981)

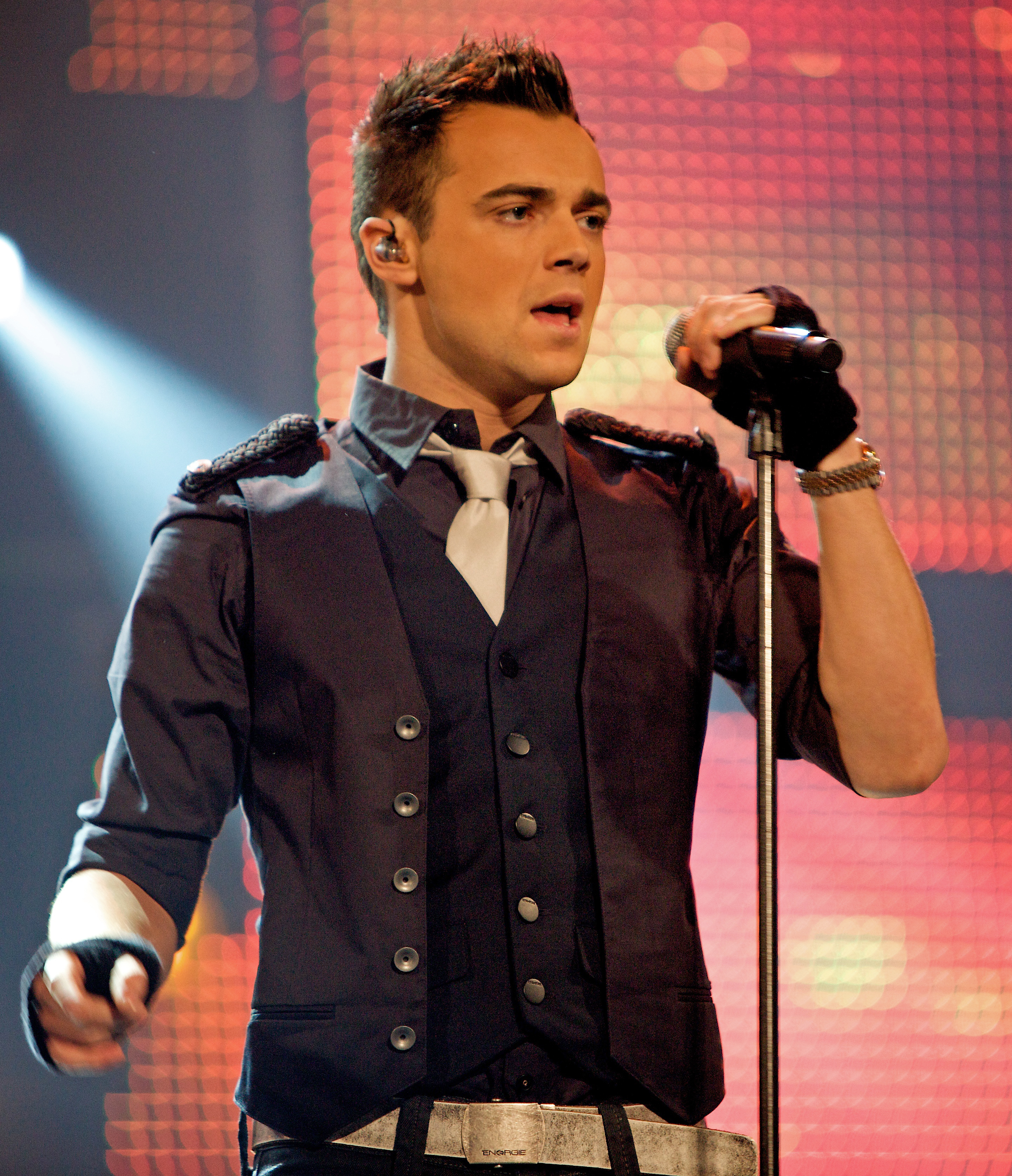
- Adams performing in Norway, 2010

Background information
- Born: Benjamin Anthony Edward Stevens Adams; 22 November 1981 (age 44)
- Origin: Ascot, England
- Genre: Pop
- Occupations: Singer, songwriter, producer
- Instruments: Vocals, keyboards
- Member of: A1, Subwoolfer

Ben Adams (born 22 November 1981) is a British singer and songwriter from Ascot, England. He represented Norway in the Eurovision Song Contest 2022 along with Gaute Ormåsen as a part of pop band Subwoolfer. He is also known as the lead singer of the British-Norwegian boy band A1.

== Early life ==
Born in Ascot, Adams attended Westminster Under School, where he became head chorister of the school choir. He later attended Bedales School, leaving aged 16, after completing his GCSEs, to join Charterhouse School.

== Career ==
=== A1 (1998–2002 and 2009–present) ===
Adams was a member of four-piece boyband a1, who won a Brit Award in 2001 for Best Newcomer and had two number one singles on the UK singles chart, "Take On Me" (the chart-topping song that was originally made famous by and written by the Norwegian band a-ha) and "Same Old Brand New You", before separating in 2002. Whilst in the boyband, Adams also scooped a Smash Hits Poll Winners Party Award for Most Fanciable Male in 2001. Ben was also gunged during the Gunge Day episode of Live and Kicking in 2000.

It was announced in 2009 that a1 were to reform to compete to represent Norway in the 2010 Eurovision Song Contest. a1 then re-signed with Universal Music Group and recorded another two studio albums "Waiting For Daylight" and "Rediscovered", which Adams co-wrote and produced. In 2013, a1 participated in The Big Reunion. In 2018, the band celebrated their 20th anniversary with an international tour.

=== Solo career (2004–present) ===
After a couple of years writing, Adams made a comeback with a new solo recording contract with BMG Records. His first solo single, "Sorry", peaked at number 18 on the UK singles chart in June 2005. As well as writing for himself, Adams began writing and producing for the likes of Robin Thicke, Craig David, JLS, Sam Bailey, Amelia Lily, Markus Feehily, Union J and Alexandra Burke to name but a few. Adams also co-wrote the Lisa Scott-Lee single "Electric" with Guy Chambers, as well as a song called "Get Off My Girl" with Har Mar Superstar.

Adams has his own recording studio situated in London called Archer Studios previously known as Parkbench Studios. Having been the creative director behind the bands Kissing Freddie, What Jane Did Next (which Adams is a part of) and MEOW. When he entered the Celebrity Big Brother house in 2009, it was revealed that Adams had worked on songs for X Factor winner, Alexandra Burke.

In 2009, Adams was a participant on the sixth series of the Channel 4 (later Channel 5) reality TV series Celebrity Big Brother, and reached the finale finishing in fifth place after the public vote, behind Coolio, Verne Troyer, Terry Christian and eventual winner Ulrika Jonsson. Adams performed as 'Prince Charming' in Milton Keynes' 2009/2010 pantomime production of Cinderella. He performed as Aladdin in Woking 2014/2015, also starring as Aladdin in Manchester 2016/2017. In 2012, Adams took part in Skal vi danse?, the Norwegian version of Strictly Come Dancing/Dancing with the Stars on TV2 Norway. His dance partner was Tone Jacobsen. He placed second.

In 2017 Adams announced plans to release his second recorded album 1981 and released und a steady stream of singles presumably from the album. No release date has been announced as of June 2020. In October 2017 Adams took a leading role in the touring version of Flashdance the Musical, starring as Nick Hurley alongside Joanne Clifton.

Adams co-wrote with Chris Wilkins a new original musical called Eugenius! which premiered as a concert performance on 29 July 2016 at the London Palladium, which was produced by Warwick Davis (who also starred in the concert). The musical received its fully staged premiere at The Other Palace from 22 January to 3 March 2018 and returning from 1 September to 7 October 2018.

In 2019, Adams released a duet with Morissette, "This Is Christmas".

=== Subwoolfer (2021–present) ===
Adams represented Norway in the Eurovision Song Contest 2022 along with Gaute Ormåsen as a part of pop band Subwoolfer. Together they performed the song "Give That Wolf a Banana", which placed 10th in the grand final with 182 points.

== Personal life ==
Adams is married to Sara Skjoldnes; together they have two children: a daughter born in 2021, and a son born in 2024.

== Discography ==
=== Solo albums ===
| Year | Title | Details |
|---|---|---|
| 2019 | All Wrapped Up | Released: 22 November 2019; Label: Ben Adams |

=== Solo singles ===
| Year | Title | Peak chart positions |
| Year | Title | UK |
|---|---|---|
| 2005 | "Sorry" | 18 |
| 2017 | "O M G" | - |
| 2017 | "Here and Now" (with Joanne Clifton) | - |
| 2017 | "Crush" | - |
| 2018 | "I Can't Make You Love Me" | - |
| 2018 | "You'll Be My Ghost" | - |
| 2019 | "Shallow" (with Ulrikke Brandstorp) | - |
| 2019 | "This Is Christmas" (with Morissette) | - |
| 2020 | "2 By 2" | - |
| 2020 | "I Can't Let Go" | - |
| 2020 | "No Make Up" | - |
| 2020 | "Progress" | - |
| 2020 | "Won't Let You Down" (with Tony Jordan) | - |
| 2021 | "Never Let You Go" (with Avian Grass) | - |
| 2022 | "24/7" (with Rogers) | - |
