= Grappa Musikkforlag albums discography =

The following is a summary of the Grappa Musikkforlag albums discography. Grappa Musikkforlag is a Norwegian record label.

Catalogue no.	Artist	Title	Release date	Format
GRCD 102	Various artists	Nattjazz 20 År	1992-01-12	CD
GRCD 1000	Various artists	Dugnad For Haiti	2010-01-12	CD
GRCD 3013	Various artists	Våre Beste Barnesanger II	1993-01-12	CD
GRCD 3016	Various artists	Våre Vakreste Vuggesanger - Byssan Lull	1997-01-12	CD
GRCD 3019	Postmann Pat	Sangene Og Musikken Fra Barne-TV	1995-01-12	CD
GRCD 3027	Mari Maurstad • Kari Stokke	I Barneværelset Med Margrethe Munthe	1995-01-12	CD
GRCD 3031	Various artists	Våre Beste Barnesanger 4	1998-01-12	CD
GRCD 3044	Kaptein Sabeltann	Hiv O'hoi! (Kaptein Sabeltanns Favoritter)	2006-01-12	2CD
GRCD 3045	Kaptein Sabeltann	Kaptein Sabeltann Og Den Forheksede Øya	2009-01-12	2CD
GRCD 4007	Lillebjørn Nilsen	Hilsen Nilsen	1985-01-12	CD
GRCD 4008	Lillebjørn Nilsen	Tekst Og Musikk: Lillebjørn Nilsen	1986-01-12	CD
GRCD 4009	Lillebjørn Nilsen	Sanger	1988-01-12	CD
GRCD 4018	Bjøro Håland	Just For You	1985-01-12	CD
GRCD 4019	Bjøro Håland	Bjøro's Beste - I Love Norwegian Country m.fl.	1986-01-12	CD
GRCD 4023	Stage Dolls	Commandos	1986-01-12	CD
GRCD 4024	Gary Holton & Casino Steel	We Did It Our Way	1986-01-12	CD
GRCD 4025	Göran Fristorp	Riktning	1987-01-12	CD
GRCD 4026	Kine Hellebust & Anders Rogg	Mot Yttersida	1987-01-12	CD
GRCD 4028	Gitarkameratene	Gitarkameratene	1989-01-12	CD
GRCD 4033	Stephen Ackles	I Ain't No Different Than You	1990-01-12	CD
GRCD 4034	Fristorp	Fristorp Spelar Och Sjunger Taube	1990-01-12	CD
GRCD 4035	Gitarkameratene	Typisk Norsk	1990-01-12	CD
GRCD 4036	Lillebjørn Nilsen	Portrett	1990-01-12	CD
GRCD 4037	Lillebjørn Nilsen	Oslo 3	1990-01-12	CD
GRCD 4038	Arild Nyquist + Terje Wiik	Epleslang	1989-01-12	CD
GRCD 4042	Kine Hellebust & Anders Rogg	Fra Innsida	1991-01-12	CD
GRCD 4043	Jan Eggum	Underveis	1991-01-12	CD
GRCD 4044	Bröd & Cirkus	Bröd & Cirkus	1991-01-12	CD
GRCD 4047	Ompakara	Såpe Tel Kvelds	1991-01-12	CD
GRCD 4050	Arve Tellefsen, Paavo Berglund, Royal Philharmonic Orchestra, Oslo Chamber Music Festival Strings	Shostakovich: Violin Concerto No. 1, Op. 99 / Bach: Violin Concerto In E Major	1993-01-12	CD
GRCD 4051	Arve Tellefsen	Intermezzo	1992-01-12	CD
GRCD 4052	Lillebjørn Nilsen	Nære Nilsen	1993-01-12	CD
GRCD 4053	Bukkene Bruse	Bukkene Bruse	1993-01-12	CD
GRCD 4054	Jan Eggum	Nesten Ikke Tilstede	1992-01-12	CD
GRCD 4056	Fairplay & Norma Winstone	Far To Go	1993-01-12	CD
GRCD 4059	Ym-Stammen	Ulv! Ulv!	1994-01-12	CD
GRCD 4075	Jan Eggum	Jan Eggum	1996-01-12	CD
GRCD 4077	Jan Eggum	Heksedans	1996-01-12	CD
GRCD 4080	Danko, Fjeld, Andersen	Ridin' On The Blinds	1994-01-12	CD
GRCD 4081	Annbjørg Lien	Felefeber	1994-01-12	CD
GRCD 4082	Maj Britt Andersen	Rippel Rappel	1994-01-12	CD
GRCD 4084	Jonas Fjeld	Live - Nerven I Min Sang	1994-01-12	CD
GRCD 4085	Jan Eggum	E.G.G.U.M.	1994-01-12	CD
GRCD 4086	Halvdan Sivertsen	Hilsen Halvdan	1994-01-12	CD
GRCD 4090	Jan Eggum	Dacapo	1996-01-12	CD
GRCD 4091	Jan Eggum	Mang Slags Kjærlighet: 40 Sanger	1994-01-12	2CD
GRCD 4092	Halvdan Sivertsen	Kjærlighetslandet	1994-01-12	CD
GRCD 4100	Bukkene Bruse	Åre	1995-01-12	CD
GRCD 4103	Lillebjørn Nilsen	40 Spor	1996-01-12	2CD
GRCD 4104	Arve Tellefsen	Arco	1995-01-12	CD
GRCD 4109	Ola Bremnes, Bodø Domkor	Vær Hilset	1995-01-12	CD
GRCD 4112	Jan Eggum	Dingli Bang	1997-01-12	CD
GRCD 4113	Annbjørg Lien	Prisme	1996-01-12	CD
GRCD 4115	Sigmund Groven + Iver Kleive	Innunder Jul	2001-01-12	CD
GRCD 4117	Ym:stammen	Guden-i-Steinen	1997-01-12	CD
GRCD 4119	Various artists	Notodden Blues Festival - The First Ten Years	1998-01-12	CD
GRCD 4122	Kirsten Bråten Berg	Frå Senegal Til Setesdal	1997-01-12	CD
GRCD 4123	Det Syng!	Ballader På Vandring	1997-01-12	CD
GRCD 4124	Chateau Neuf Spelemannslag	Tjuvgods	1997-01-12	CD
GRCD 4125	DDR	Norwegische Superknüller	2001-01-12	CD
GRCD 4127	Eldbjørg Raknes, Kjetil Saunes, Petronella Barker, Henrik Mestad, Ketil Bjørnstad	Reisetid	1997-01-12	CD
GRCD 4132	Aurora Borealis	Harpa	1997-01-12	CD
GRCD 4133	Kaia Huuse	De Som Kan Noe Annet	1998-01-12	CD
GRCD 4134	Maj Britt Andersen	Vinterkropp	1997-01-12	CD
GRCD 4135	Unge Frustrerte Menn	Dronningen Av Kalde Føtter	2001-01-12	CD
GRCD 4137	Kine Hellebust	Det Hainnle Om Å Leve - Mellom Anna	1997-01-12	CD
GRCD 4138	Unge Frustrerte Menn	Hodet I Sanden	1997-01-12	CD
GRCD 4146	Rypdal & Tekrø	Rypdal & Tekrø II	1998-01-12	CD
GRCD 4149	Kjetil Saunes	Arkana	1999-01-12	CD
GRCD 4152	Dollie	Dollie's Beste	2001-01-12	CD
GRCD 4153	D.D.R.	Über Alles	1998-01-12	CD
GRCD 4155	Dollie	Rampelys	2005-01-12	CD
GRCD 4158	Annbjørg Lien	Baba Yaga	1999-01-12	CD
GRCD 4159	Lars Saabye Christensen • Ole Henrik Giørtz - Anne Marie Almedal, Anne Marie Giørtz, Kristin Kajander, Elin Rosseland	Skrapjern Og Silke	1999-01-12	CD
GRCD 4160	Kaia Huuse	Egentlig Kunstner	1999-01-12	CD
GRCD 4161	Nordstoga	Nordstoga	2000-01-12	CD
GRCD 4164	Various artists	Smak Av Himmel, Spor Av Jord	1999-01-12	2CD
GRCD 4165	Jan Eggum	Deilig	1999-01-12	CD
GRCD 4168	Dollie De Luxe	Rock Vs. Opera	2005-01-12	CD
GRCD 4176	Jan Eggum	Ekte Eggum (Jan Eggums Beste Sanger)	2001-01-12	CD
GRCD 4177	Kirsten Bråten Berg	Syng Du Mi Røyst	2001-01-12	CD
GRCD 4178	Annbjørg Lien	Aliens Alive	2002-01-12	CD
GRCD 4179	Terje Formoe	Umaskert	2001-01-12	CD
GRCD 4182	Dollie	Dollie's Dagbok	2005-01-12	CD
GRCD 4183	Dollie	Første Akt	2005-01-12	CD
GRCD 4187	Jan Eggum	President	2002-01-12	CD
GRCD 4189	Karin Krog / Jacob Young	Where Flamingos Fly	2002-01-12	CD
GRCD 4190	Floweryard	Morning Mist	2003-01-12	CD
GRCD 4191	Tre Vise Menn	...I Ein Tynne Tråd	2002-01-12	CD
GRCD 4196	Unge Frustrerte Menn	Solen Titter Frem - De Beste Sangene	2002-01-12	CD
GRCD 4211	Bendik Hofseth	Itaka	2005-01-12	CD
GRCD 4212	Bergen Big Band, Karin Krog Directed by John Surman	Seagull	2005-01-12	CD
GRCD 4214	Vidar Busk, Kid Andersen, Junior Watson	Guitarmageddon	2005-03-22	CD
GRCD 4215	The Source Of Christmas	Live	2007-11-27	2CD
GRCD 4216	Johanna Demker	Pictures Of Me	2005-05-08	CD
GRCD 4217	Vidar Busk, Kid Andersen, Junior Watson	Guitarmageddon	2006-05-26	CD
GRCD 4223	Unni Løvlid	Rite	2008-01-12	CD
GRCD 4225	ld Heide Steen Jr.	Munnskold Over Alle Grenser	2008-01-12	CD
GRCD 4230	Jan Eggum	30/30	2005-01-12	2CD
GRCD 4237	Lillebjørn Nilsen / Steinar Ofsdal	Live At Sioux Falls South Dakota!	2006-01-12	CD
GRCD 4245	Pitsj	Pitsj	2006-01-12	CD
GRCD 4246	Erlend Skomsvoll	Variasjoner	2006-01-12	CD
GRCD 4247	Karin Krog / Steve Kuhn	Together Again	2006-01-12	CD
GRCD 4249	Liv Dommersnes / Karin Krog + John Surman	Wildenvey I Ord Og Toner	2007-01-12	CD
GRCD 4251	Various artists	Julens Favoritter Volum 2	2006-01-12	CD
GRCD 4253	Bodø Domkor	Meditatus	2007-01-12	CD
GRCD 4254	The Indian Core	The Indian Core	2007-01-12	CD
GRCD 4257	Kirsti Huke	Deloo	2007-01-12	CD
GRCD 4265	Jan Eggum	Hjerteknuser	2007-01-12	CD
GRCD 4268	Henning Sommerro	Magnificat	2008-01-12	CD
GRCD 4269	Various artists	Sommer Favoritter Volum 2	2007-01-12	CD
GRCD 4272	Jan Gunnar Hoff	Magma	2008-01-12	CD
GRCD 4274	Anne Marie Kvien	Barnet Er Født	2007-01-12	CD
GRCD 4275	Music For A While	Weill Variations	2007-01-12	CD
GRCD 4279	Bergen Big Band feat. The Core	Meditations On Coltrane	2007-01-12	CD
GRCD 4280	Various artists	Julens Beste Volum 1	2007-01-12	2CD
GRCD 4282	Ompakara	Gangsterpolka	2008-01-12	CD
GRCD 4283	Erlend Skomsvoll	52 : 29	2008-01-12	CD/DVD
GRCD 4287	Elisabeth Andreassen	Spellemann	2009-01-12	CD
GRCD 4288	Bergen Mandolinband	Lang Veg Til Tysvær	2008-01-12	CD
GRCD 4289	Lill Lindfors, Ketil Bjørnstad	Coastlines	2008-01-12	CD
GRCD 4291	Kjetil Saunes	Måne Blek	2008-01-12	CD
GRCD 4294	Nidarosdomens Guttekor	I Wish	2008-01-12	CD
GRCD 4296	Anne-Marie Giørtz	På Egne Vegne	2009-01-12	CD
GRCD 4297	Bergen Big Band	Som Den Gyldne Sol Frembryter	2008-01-12	CD
GRCD 4298	DDR	Das War Das	2009-01-12	CD
GRCD 4305	Bendik Hofseth	XI	2009-01-12	CD
GRCD 4307	Siri Nilsen	Vi Som Ser I Mørket	2009	CD
GRCD 4310	Black Debbath	Black Debbaths Beste - 10 År Med Rock Mot Alt Som Er Kult	2009-01-12	2CD
GRCD 4312	Black Debbath	Black Debbath´s Beste - 10 År Med Rock Mot Alt Som Er Kult	2009-01-12	2CD/DVD
GRCD 4316	Apes&Babes	Planet Of Apes&Babes	2009-01-12	CD
GRCD 4319	Helge Iberg	Standards And Vanguards	2009-01-12	CD
GRCD 4321	Bjørn Berge	Fretwork	2009-01-12	CD
GRCD 4323	Augestad & Waagaard Duo	Over The Piano (American Cabaret Songs)	2009-01-12	CD
GRCD 4326	Knut Avenstroup Haugen	Age Of Conan - Rise Of The Godslayer	2010-01-12	CD/DVD
GRCD 4327	Elisabeth Andreassen	Kärleken & Livet - 13 Sanger Av Rolf Løvland	2010-01-12	CD
GRCD 4328	Ketil Bjørnstad	Hvalenes Sang (Oratorium)	2010-01-12	CD
GRCD 4330	Frida Ånnevik	Synlige Hjerteslag	2010-11-01	CD
GRCD 4334	Bergen Mandolinband	Til Skogen	2010-01-12	CD
GRCD 4337	Susanna Wallumrød Synger Gunvor Hofmo	Jeg Vil Hjem Til Menneskene	2011-01-12	CD
GRCD 4340	Gitarkameratene	Kanon!	2010-01-12	CD
GRCD 4343	Bolteløkka Jentekor	Mine Visur	2010-01-12	CD
GRCD 4351	Vidar Busk & His True Believers	Stompin' Our Feet With Joy	2011-01-12	CD
GRCD 4355	Hanne Boel	The Shining Of Things	2011-04-04	CD
GRCD 4360	Lillebjørn Nilsen	Stilleste Gutt På Sovesal 1	2010-01-12	10CD/DVD
GRCD 4361	Lillebjørn Nilsen	Tilbake	2010-01-12	CD
GRCD 4362	Lillebjørn Nilsen	Portrett	2010-01-12	CD
GRCD 4363	Lillebjørn + Various artists	...Og Fia Hadde Sko!	2010-01-12	CD
GRCD 4364	Lillebjørn Nilsen	Byen Med Det Store Hjertet	2010-01-12	CD
GRCD 4365	Lillebjørn Nilsen	Hei-Fara!	2010-01-12	CD
GRCD 4366	Lillebjørn Nilsen	Oslo 3	2010-01-12	CD
GRCD 4367	Lillebjørn Nilsen	Original Nilsen	2010-01-12	CD
GRCD 4368	Lillebjørn Nilsen	Hilsen Nilsen	2010-01-12	CD
GRCD 4369	Lillebjørn Nilsen	Sanger	2010-01-12	CD
GRCD 4370	Lillebjørn Nilsen	Nære Nilsen	2010-01-12	CD
GRCD 4372	Siri Nilsen	Alle Snakker Sant	2011-11-11	CD
GRCD 4382	Bjørn Berge	Blackwood	2011-01-12	CD
GRCD 4391	Frida Ånnevik	Ville Ord	2013-09-06	CD
GRCD 4392	Bergen Mandolinband	Flotmyr Gumbo	2012-01-12	CD
GRCD 4397	De Musikalske Dvergene	Tunge Steiner	2012-01-12	CD
GRCD 4404	Jens Gunderssen	Stjerner Lyser Hvite	2012-01-12	2CD
GRCD 4408	Music For A While	Graces That Refrain	2012-01-12	CD
GRCD 4414	Ketil Bjørnstad	Ophelia's Arrival / Minotauros	2014-01-12	CD
GRCD 4416	The Source	The Source Of Summer	2013-01-12	2CD
GRCD 4419	Kaia Huuse	Fint Å Være Rar	2014-01-12	CD
GRCD 4425	Elvira Nikolaisen + Mathias Eick	I Concentrate On You	2013-01-12	CD
GRCD 4427	Julius Winger	Under Linden (Viser Av Robert Levin)	2013-01-12	CD
GRCD 4428	BOA	mOOn Over tOwns	2013-01-12	CD
GRCD 4430	Kaia Huuse	Det Eneste Jeg Vil	2014-01-12	CD
GRCD 4444	Siri Nilsen	Skyggebokser	2014-10-03	CD
GRCD 4449	Lena Nymark	Beautiful Silence	2014-01-12	CD
GRCD 4458	Music For A While	Canticles Of Winter	2014-01-12	CD
GRCD 4459	John Surman / Bergen Big Band	Another Sky	2014-01-12	CD
GRCD 4460	Elin Furubotn	Å Nærme Seg Det Nære	2014-01-12	CD
GRCD 4464	Espen Eriksen, Gunnar Halle	Psalm	2014-01-12	CD
GRCD 4472	In The Country & Frida Ånnevik	Skogenes Sang	2014-10-17	CD
GRCD 4474	Giørtz + Saabye Christensen	Det Kromatiske Minnet	2015-01-12	CD
GRCD 4475	Helge Lien + Sigurd Hole	Lyden Av Prøysen	2014-01-12	CD
GRCD 4478	Bolteløkka Jentekor	Jolevisur	2014-02-06	CD
