= Dolphin Club (Norway) =

Music club in Oslo, Norway

The Dolphin Club (Norwegian: Dolphins viseklubb) was a music club in Oslo, Norway.

The club was started at the initiative of the Norwegian painter and graphic artist Ole Hauki (a.k.a. Dolphin) on March 12, 1966. Hauki had returned from a stay in the United States, and brought the idea for the club back with him. Hauki managed the club for five years. The club's first meeting place was at what is now the Vegeta Vertshus restaurant (formerly known as Frisksportrestauranten) at Grensen no. 18 in Oslo. The venue was limited to 70 people and music evenings were held on Saturdays. The club was so popular that it also started meeting on Wednesdays. In 1968, the club relocated to the Masonic building, where there was room for 300. It became inactive in 1970.

The Dolphin Club started the Norwegian "ballad wave" (visebølgen). The movement therefore did not start in lugubrious cellars with wine and candles, but in an alcohol-free vegetarian café where carrot juice was the strongest drink.

The first group to appear at the Dolphin Club was The Sing Singers with Ole Hauki, Bjørn Tonhaugen, Karin Hvidsten, and Ole Paus. Others that were active there included Lillebjørn Nilsen, Kari Svendsen, Bjørn Morisse, Øystein Sunde, Lars Klevstrand, Hege Tunaal, Finn Kalvik, Jon Arne Corell, and Steinar Ofsdal, as well as groups such as Kinsfolk, Gruppe 4, Christiania Fusel & Blaagress, and The Young Norwegians.
