= Oslo byleksikon =

Encyclopaedia on the city of Oslo, Norway

- Website type: oslobyleksikon.no Online encyclopedia of Oslo
- Available in: Bokmål
- Predecessor: Five book editions
- Headquarters: Oslo, {{{location_country}}}
- Area served: City of Oslo
- Creator: Selskabet for Oslo Byes Vel
- Editor: Ole Rikard Høisæther
- Parent: Kunnskapsforlaget
- Website: oslobyleksikon.no
- Commercial: No
- Registration: Places, buildings and historical events in Oslo
- Launched: 6 February 2020; 6 years ago
- Current status: Active
- Written in: Norwegian Bokmål

Oslo byleksikon (English: Oslo City Encyclopaedia) is an encyclopaedia on Oslo, Norway's capital city. It has been published in five editions since 1938. The third, fourth and the fifth editions were published in cooperation between the heritage association Selskabet for Oslo Byes Vel and the publishing house Kunnskapsforlaget. The latest edition was published in 2010, comprising approximately 6,100 entries.

== Editions ==
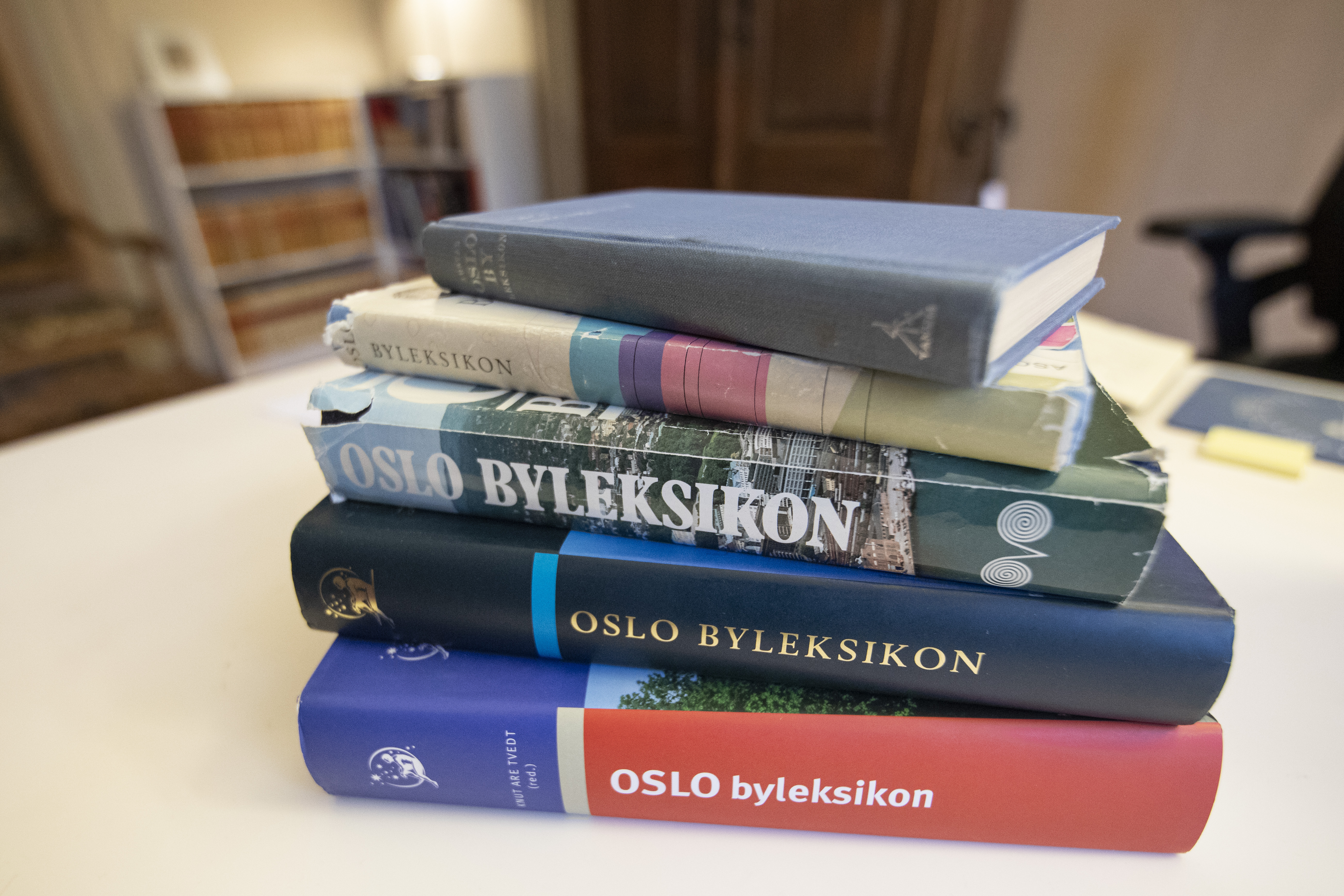
The five book editions of the encyclopedia Oslo byleksikon.

=== First edition (1938) ===
The first edition of Oslo byleksikon was published by the Tanum publishing house. It was written and edited by the geographer Aksel Arstal (1855–1940), who was more than 80 years old at the time of publication. In the edition's preface, Arstal states that "the book should contain everything what an Oslo citizen ought to know about the city and the region he frequently visits". Arstal also stated that he wanted the entries in the encyclopedia to be "short, accurate and factual" and without "passion".

The edition strictly followed the new orthographic reform of 1938, which was very radical for its time. In a review of the encyclopaedia for St. Hallvard, architect and antiquarian Arno Berg devoted three pages to finding errors, stating that "finding errors could be a funny sport". He nonetheless praised Arstal for his work with the encyclopaedia, maintaining that it was a "good, funny, and above all a useful book".

=== Second edition (1966) ===
In 1948, the municipalities Aker and Oslo were merged, which meant an expansion of the city's area from 17 square kilometres (6.6 sq mi) to 453 square kilometres (175 sq mi). Journalist and author Carl Just (1897–1990) thought that the new, expanded city needed a new encyclopaedia, and started working on the second edition, which eventually was published in 1966. This edition was less systematic than the first edition, introducing much trivia about Oslo that Just was familiar with.

In the encyclopaedia, Just enlarged the entries on Oslo's streets by adding descriptions on houses and their architects. The art historian and urban planner Bjørn Sverre Pedersen (1926–2003) assisted Just with the entries on architecture, though he was not credited in the edition's preface. Just added a new feature in the second edition: A large entry on Oslo in the beginning of the book, containing information on urban planning, nature, geology, plant and animal life, history and politics. The second edition had few illustrations, even fewer than in the first.

=== Third edition (1987) ===
The third edition was published in cooperation between the heritage association Selskabet for Oslo Byes Vel and the publishing house Kunnskapsforlaget in the autumn of 1987. It was edited by Reidar Hanssen (1929–1996), and comprised almost 5,000 entries on 650 pages. The entries were written by more than 50 different people. This edition introduced tables containing information on the city's mayors, award winners, theatre directors, monuments and memorials. It also introduced a systematic index of the contents of the book to aid the reader. The edition became an economical success; a total of 13,000 copies of the encyclopaedia were sold.

=== Fourth edition (2000) ===
The fourth edition was edited by Knut Are Tvedt (1952–). It was expanded with approximately 50 per cent, featuring 5,600 entries. The new content comprised entries on the new administrative boroughs, the Oslo forest, organisations, newspapers, minor sports clubs and political parties. One new feature with the fourth edition was a map in the rear end of the book. This edition also became an economical success—15,000 copies were printed.

=== Fifth edition (2010) ===
The number of entries in the fifth edition grew from 5,600 to 6,100. The new entries were mostly about enterprises and residential areas. This edition was also edited by Knut Are Tvedt, who toyed with the idea of digitalising the encyclopaedia.

=== Online edition ===
Oslobyleksikon.no is the sixth edition of Oslo Byleksikon and is disseminated digitally on internet. The website with textual content is owned and operated by the Selskabet for Oslo Byes Vel. The digital encyclopedia was officially launched on 6 February 2020 and has been realized with financial support from, among others, Fritt Ord and the City of Oslo. Reuse of text must be credited to oslobyleksikon.no.
