= Gerd Gudding =

- Also known as: Lina Larsen
- Born: Gerd Ellen Gudding; November 15, 1951; Oslo
- Origin: Norway
- Died: July 14, 2015 (aged 63)
- Genres: Folk music
- Occupations: Musician, entertainer
- Instruments: Fiddle, bass guitar, vocals

Gerd Ellen "Lillemor" Gudding (November 15, 1951 – July 14, 2015) was a Norwegian musician, fiddler, bass guitarist, and singer, married 9 June 1973 to the artist Øystein Dolmen (divorced).

== Life ==
Gudding grew up in Oslo's Frogner neighborhood along with her sister Aase and brother Gunnar; their parents were from Trøndelag. She played violin in the band Veslefrikk at Majorstuen School. As a teenager she went to the Dolphin Club, where she became a fiddler in the band Christiania Fusel & Blaagress, playing together with Kari Svendsen and Øystein Sunde, among others. She later played with the band Knutsen & Ludvigsen and the group Bakklandet Bassangforening, where she played the character of Lina Larsen in their signature piece "Kristiansunds Nasjonalsang" (Kristiansund Anthem).

She also worked in customer service at the Brygge Theater and Oslo New Theater, and then worked at the Norwegian National Opera and Ballet.

Gudding died at age 63 on July 14, 2015, at the Lovisenberg Hospice.

== Discography ==
=== With Bakklandet Bassangforening ===
- Ned med Nidaros (1975)
- Du milde Mosart (1977)

=== Other collaboration ===
- Øystein Sunde: Det året det var så bratt (1971)
- Convivium: Convivium (1971)
- Knutsen & Ludvigsen: Brunost no igjæn? (1972)
- Knutsen & Ludvigsen: Balladen om Nancy Drew/Rett West (1973)
- Knutsen & Ludvigsen: Knutsen og Ludvigsen nr. 3 – Tut (1974)
- Ivar Medaas: Vårteikn (1976)
- Stig Nilsson: Brunost og sirop og brø (1977)
- Christiania Fusel & Blaagress: Som varmt hvetebrød i tørt gress (reissued 1993)
- Knutsen & Ludvigsen: Knutsen & Ludvigsens beste (1996)
- Knutsen & Ludvigsen: Knutsen & Ludvigsens vær'ste (1997)
- Knutsen & Ludvigsen: Dum og deilig: Knutsen & Ludvigsens beste (2008)
