= Medal of St. Hallvard =

Norwegian civil award

The Medal of St. Hallvard (Norwegian: St. Hallvardsmedaljen) is the highest award of the City of Oslo, Norway. It is awarded to people who have made a particularly noteworthy contribution to the City of Oslo. It is named after the city's patron, Saint Hallvard (ca. 1020–1043). The medal was designed by goldsmith Jacob Prytz (1886–1962) of the jewelry firm J. Tostrup in Oslo. It has been awarded since 1956.

== Recipients ==
The following people have received the medal:

- 1956 Arnstein Arneberg, Randolf Arnesen, Arno Berg, Gerhard Fischer, Rachel Grepp, Paul Hartmann, Hieronymus Heyerdahl, Sverre Iversen, Per Kviberg, Arthur Nordlie, Magnus Poulsson, Anna Sethne, H. E. Stokke, Sigrid Syvertsen
- 1957 Rolf Gjessing, Harald Hals, Almar Lund, Haavard Martinsen, Carl Muller
- 1958 Ulrik Hendriksen, Rolf Hofmo, Yngvar Kjelstrup, Johan Lofthus, Marius Røhne, Ragnhild Schibbye, Martin Strandli
- 1959 Harry Fett
- 1960 Trygve Nilsen, Rolf Stranger
- 1961 no award
- 1962 Carl Just, Halfdan Wigaard
- 1963 no award
- 1964 Aasny Stoltenberg, Gunvor Vogt
- 1965 Carl Semb
- 1966 Laura Nadheim, Karen Kapmann Bothner
- 1967 Eyvind Alnæs, Katy Due, Andreas Grasmo, Alfhild Hovdan, Eugen Johannessen, Henny Ording
- 1968–69 no award
- 1970 Einar Gerhardsen, Chr. L. Jensen, Arild Sandvold, Egil Storstein, Arnfinn Vik
- 1971 Egil Werner Erichsen, John Johansen, Hjalmar Larsen, Alf Rolfsen, Signy Stamnes
- 1972–73 no award
- 1974 Chris Bruusgaard, Georg Eriksen, Gerda Evang, Harald Frøshaug, Omar Gjesteby, Erling Hagen, Nils Houge, Lars Ljøgodt, Gunnar Nielsen
- 1975 Gunnar Bech, Øystein Egelund, Brita Collett Paus, Hans Sundrønning
- 1976 Brynjulf Bull, Ole Bjune, Eva Kolstad, Jakob Vaage
- 1977 Viktor Gaustad, Lille Graah, Rolf Stenersen, Knut Tvedt
- 1978 Vera Fjeldstad, Tor Albert Henni, Jon Kojen, Hallvard Vislie, Fredrik Chr. Wildhagen
- 1979 no award
- 1980 Jenny Haugen, Petter Koren, Birgit Sunnaas
- 1981 Anne Nilsen, Arne Sandbu, Christian Bruusgaard, Odd Kjus
- 1982 Einar Bergsland, Rolf Karlsen, Hjørdis Lundh
- 1983 Else Marit Larsen, Ragnar Falck Anderssen, Bergljot Gudim, Svein Fakset, Ragnhild Eriksen, Boris Hansen
- 1984–85 no award
- 1986 Olav Selvaag, Erik Sture Larre, Gøsta Åbergh, Sofie Helene Wigert, Mariss Jansons, Fredrik Mellbye
- 1987 no award
- 1988 Bjørn Bjørnseth, Merle Sivertsen, Ivar Mathisen, Odd Wivegh, Nanna Lynneberg, Willy Enersen, Odd Wien, Odd Gjesteby
- 1989 Grete Waitz, Kaare Kopperud, Mentz Schulerud, Petter Ludvigsen
- 1990 no award
- 1991 Erik Melvold, Nico Demetriades, Torstein Grythe, Wenche Foss, Rønnaug Johansen
- 1992 no award
- 1993 Mosse Jørgensen, Albert Nordengen, Trygve Flagstad
- 1994 no award
- 1995 Henriette Bie Lorentzen, Thorleif Kleive, Frode Rinnan, Jan Hemsvik
- 1996 Per Aabel
- 1997 Thor Heyerdahl
- 1998 no award
- 1999 Bernt H. Lund
- 2000 Rolf Nyhus, Njål Djurhuus og Erna Djurhuus, Hans Svelland
- 2001 no award
- 2002 Aud Schønemann, Rigmor Andresen
- 2003–2005: no award
- 2006 Gunnar Stålsett
- 2007 Tor Holtan-Hartwig, Kjetil André Aamodt
- 2008 Hjalmar Kielland
- 2009 Gunnar Sønsteby
- 2010 Børre Rognlien
- 2011 Kari Svendsen
- 2012 Ingen utdeling
- 2013 Per Ditlev-Simonsen, Tor Sannerød, Inger Seim, Ann-Marit Sæbønes
- 2014 Thomas Thiis-Evensen
- 2015 Christian Ringnes, Jorun Valeur Bekkby og Fakhra Salimi
- 2016 Erling Lae, Martin Mæland
- 2017 Marianne Lind, Lillebjørn Nilsen
- 2018 Lars Saabye Christensen
- 2019 Sissel Rønbeck, Ida Fossum Tønnessen
- 2020 no award
- 2021 Knut Johannesen, Nasreen Begum
