= Dolphin Club =

Dolphin Club may refer to:

- Dolphin Club (San Francisco), an American athletic club, established in 1877.
- Dolphin Club (Norway), a Norwegian music club, established in 1966.
  - "The Dolphin Club", a single by Espen Lind from the album This Is Pop Music
- Dolphin Club, former name for Dolphin Show, a musical theatre organization at Northwestern University
- Dolphin F.C. (Dublin), an Irish association football club
- Dolphin RFC, a rugby club in Cork, Ireland

== See also ==
- Dolphin (disambiguation)#Sports, list of sports clubs named Dolphins
