= Gudding =

Gudding is a surname. Notable people with the surname include:

- Gabriel Gudding (born 1966), American poet, essayist, and translator
- Gerd Gudding (1951–2015), Norwegian fiddler, bass guitarist, and singer
- Christopher Gudding (born 1982), Healthcare Executive and philanthropist
