= Arnesen =

Arnesen is a Danish-Norwegian patronymic surname meaning “son of Arne”.

Notable people with the surname include:

- Arne Arnesen (1928–2010), Norwegian diplomat and politician
- Bodil Arnesen (born 1967), Norwegian operatic soprano
- Christian Arnesen (1890–1956), Norwegian wrestler
- Deborah Arnie Arnesen (born 1953), American politician
- Dag Arnesen (born 1950), Norwegian jazz pianist
- Eric Arnesen (born 1958), American historian
- Frank Arnesen (born 1956), Danish footballer
- Harald Astrup Arnesen (born 1995), Norwegian cross-country skier
- Heidi Arnesen, Norwegian orienteering competitor
- Kim André Arnesen (born 1980), Norwegian composer
- Lasse Arnesen (born 1965), Norwegian alpine skier
- Liv Arnesen (born 1953), Norwegian cross-country skier
- Randolf Arnesen (1880–1958), Norwegian trade unionist, cooperativist and politician
