= OBOS =

OBOS may stand for:

- Obos (fountain), a sculptural fountain by George Tsutakawa at the Jefferson National Life Building in downtown Indianapolis, Indiana
- Our Bodies, Ourselves, a book by the Boston Women's Health Book Collective, first published in 1971
- Oslo Bolig- og Sparelag, a Norwegian housing company founded by Martin Strandli
- OpenBeOS, an operating system now known as Haiku
