= Lars Klevstrand =

Norwegian singer, guitarist, composer and actor

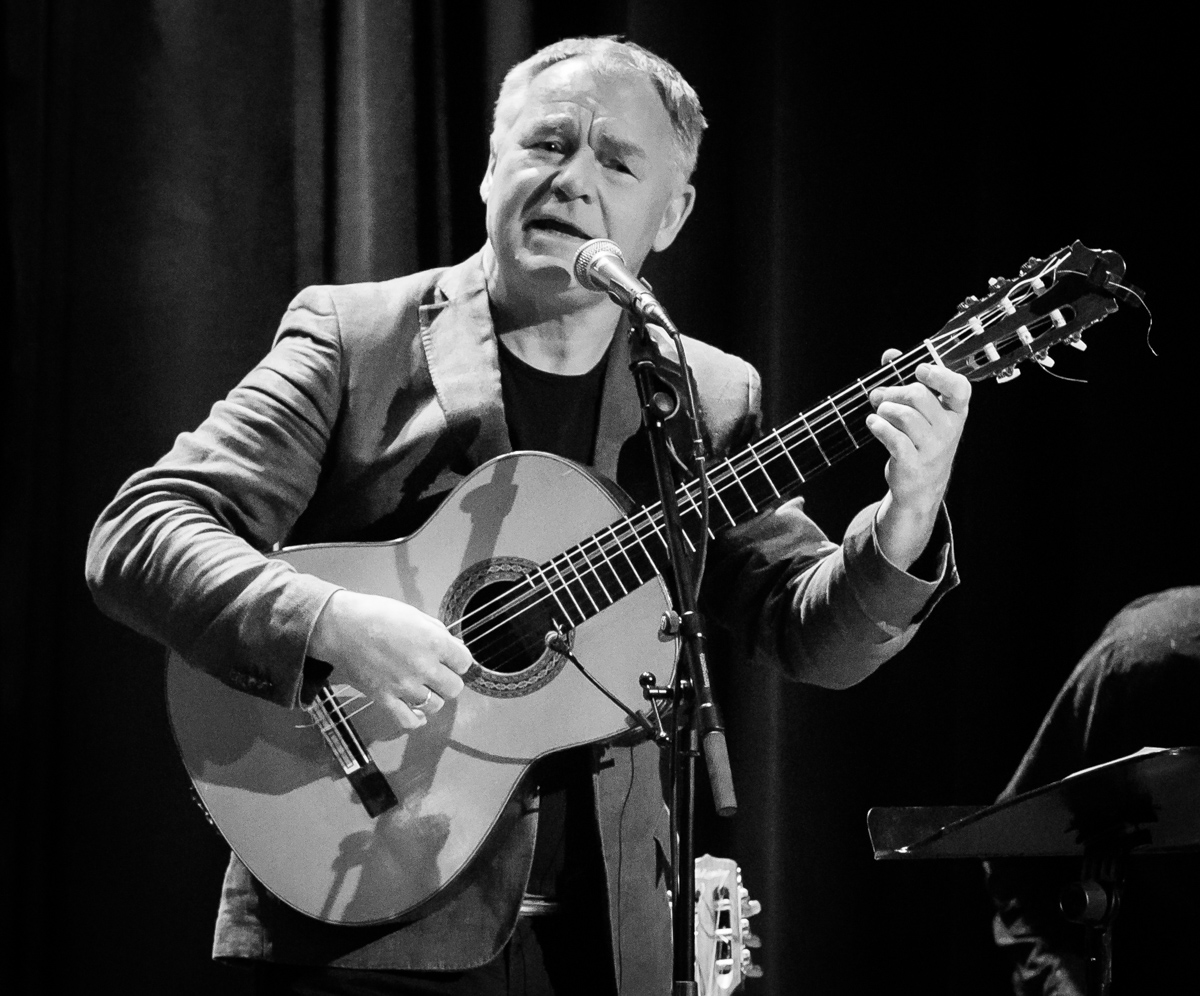
- Lars Klevstrand in 2016
- Born: 30 September 1949 (age 75); Drammen, Norway
- Occupation(s): Singer; Guitarist; Composer
- Awards: Spellemannprisen; Gammleng-prisen

Lars Klevstrand (born 30 September 1949) is a Norwegian singer, guitarist, composer and actor. He was born in Drammen, Buskerud, the son of Olav Klevstrand and Grethe Sofie Larsen, and was brought up in Bærum.

== Career ==
His debut album was Vi skal ikkje sova from 1968. In 1970, he published the songbook Gjøglerhåndbok. Among his albums from the 1970s were På stengrunn from 1973 (a cooperation with Lillebjørn Nilsen, Kari Svendsen and others), Riv ned Gjerdene! from 1976, and Høysang from 1978. His album Viser til Mariann from 1983 was awarded Spellemannprisen. He made his debut as actor at Det Norske Teatret in 1975, in a cabaret on Jacques Brel which run for 250 performances. He has later played in musicals at Nationaltheatret, at Chateau Neuf, at Oslo Nye Teater and at Sogn og Fjordane Teater. He was awarded the prize Målblomen in 1970, Prøysenprisen from 1991, and Gammleng-prisen. He was a member of the board of Norges Kunstnerråd from 1993 to 1995, and a board member of the Nordic House in the Faroe Islands from 1995 to 2000.

== Honors ==
- 1970: Målblomen
- 1983: Spellemannprisen in the category Folk, for the album Ola Skutvik og Mariann Kirans tunes
- 1987: Gammleng-prisen
- 1991: Prøysenprisen

== Discography ==
- 1968: Vi Skal Ikkje Sova
- 1969: Dobbeltportrett – with Hege Tunaal
- 1972: Til Dere
- 1973: På Stengrunn – with Lillebjørn Nilsen, Steinar Ofsdal, Kari Svendsen, Jon Arne Corell and others
- 1974: Twostep og Blå Ballader
- 1975: Live (2lp)
- 1976: Riv Ned Gjerdene – with Guttorm Guttormsen
- 1977: Ballade! På turné – with Ballade!
- 1978: Høysang – with Guttorm Guttormsen kvintett
- 1979: To I Spann – with Steinar Ofsdal
- 1981: Frie Hender
- 1982: Canto General - with Arja Saijonmaa
- 1983: Visions
- 1983: Ola Skutvik og Mariann
- 1985: Glassberget
- 1987: Her
- 1989: I Fløyterens Hjerte
- 1991: Så Lenge Hjärtat Kan Slå
- 1995: Å, Dette Hjartet
- 1996: Sang For Vinden
- 2001: Vinternatt
- 2001: Himlajord
- 2004: Nomadesongar
- 2006: Sundslegen, Herja og Naken
