= Bjørn Morisse =

Norwegian musician, illustrator and comics creator

- Born: Bjørn Morisse; 7 February 1944; Oslo, Norway
- Died: 27 July 2006 (aged 62); Kristiansand
- Occupations: musician, illustrator and comics creator
- Known for: Creator (principal composer and guitar player) of the Band THE YOUNG NORWEGIANS
- Children: Andre von Morisse born on 23 April 1966
- Parent(s): Reidar and Henny Morisse (born Wiffthøft
- Relatives: Ex-Wife Aud Berggren - mother of his only son Andre. Brothers Tor Morisse and Stein Morisse

Bjørn Morisse (7 February 1944 – 27 July 2006) was a Norwegian musician, illustrator and comics creator.

== Personal life ==
Morisse was born in Oslo and was a brother of Tor Morisse. Having spent part of his childhood in the United States, he was educated as illustrator. Bjorn was married to Aud Berggren - mother of his only son Andre born on 23 April 1966, he divorced Aud Berggren in 1972. He then married Penny Sugg (after their divorce she remarried and got Holtzem as surname) in 1974 until 1982. His son Andre lives and works in New York city. Bjørn died in Kristiansand in July 2006.

== Career ==
In 1966 Morisse formed the musical duo The Young Norwegians along with Bjørn Falk Nilsen. They performed at the Dolphin Club in Oslo, and made their television debut in 1966. In 1967 they issued their first album, Things On Our Mind.

His humorous comic strip Glåmrik was published in the newspaper Dagbladet from 1972 to 1975 and subsequently issued as a three-volume album series.
