= Strandli =

Strandli is a Norwegian surname that may refer to

- Are Strandli (born 1988), Norwegian rower
- Frank Strandli (born 1972), Norwegian football striker
- Martin Strandli (1890–1973), Norwegian trade unionist and politician
- Sverre Strandli (1925–1985), Norwegian hammer thrower
