= Andreas Grasmo =

Norwegian priest (1912–1986)

Andreas Grasmo (7 November 1912 – 13 October 1986) was a Norwegian priest and organizational leader. He was born in Vardø; the son of parish priest Johan Oskar Grasmo. He graduated as cand.theol. from the MF Norwegian School of Theology in 1937. After World War II he organized humanitarian aid from the Church of Norway among refugees in Germany, a work which was the start of the humanitarian organization Norwegian Church Aid, with a worldwide scope. From 1952 he served as leader of the Church City Mission. He was decorated Knight First Class of the Order of St. Olav in 1970, and was awarded the Medal of St. Hallvard.
