= Chris Bruusgaard =

Norwegian midwife

- Born: Christine Corneliussen; 14 January 1910; Kristiania, Norway
- Died: 22 September 2000 (aged 90); Oslo, Norway
- Occupation: Midwife
- Parent: Elias Corneliussen
- Awards: Medal of St. Hallvard

Christine "Chris" Bruusgaard (14 January 1910 – 22 September 2000) was a Norwegian midwife.

She was born in Kristiania to naval officer, later admiral Elias Corneliussen and Dagny Ree, and was married to physician Arne Bruusgaard. After studies in Scotland, England, France and Oslo, she graduated as midwife in Bergen in 1934. She worked at Mødrehygienekontoret in Oslo, which she chaired from 1945. Also, inspired by the pioneer Katti Anker Møller, she toured giving lectures on birth control, at a time when the subjects of sex information and contraception still were more or less taboo.

She was awarded the Medal of St. Hallvard in 1974.
