= Knut Berg =

Norwegian art historian and museologist

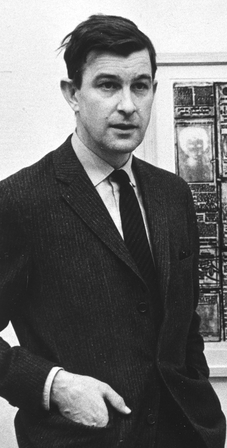
- Born: 4 August 1925; Oslo, Norway
- Died: 29 November 2007 (aged 82); Oslo, Norway
- Education: University of Oslo
- Occupations: art historian and museologist
- Employer: National Gallery of Norway
- Parent: Arno Berg

Knut Berg (4 August 1925 – 29 November 2007) was a Norwegian art historian and museologist.

== Biography ==
He was born in Oslo, Norway. He was the son of architect and antiquarian Arno Berg (1890–1974) and Signe Mowinckel Larsen (1887–1966). His father was the first head of the department for cultural heritage in Oslo. He studied at the University of Oslo obtaining a master's degree in art history in 1953. He continued his medieval studies in the United Kingdom, Italy and France. In 1967 he became dr.philos.

Berg was assigned with the National Gallery of Norway for thirty years, and served as director of the museum for 22 years, from 1973 to 1995. His works include the 7-volume Norges kunsthistorie (principal editor and contributor) and Norges malerkunst (1993), and he was project leader for Norsk Kunstnerleksikon, jointly with Stephan Tschudi-Madsen (1923–2007). Knut Berg was a member of the Norwegian Academy of Sciences and Commander of the Order of St. Olav.

== Selected works ==
- Norsk kunstnerleksikon : bildende kunstnere, arkitekter, kunsthåndverkere (1982)
- Norsk malerkunst (1993)
