= Tor Morisse =

Norwegian illustrator and cartoonist

- Born: 10 July 1947
- Died: 17 May 2017 (aged 69)
- Occupations: illustrator, children's writer and comics creator

Tor Morisse (10 July 1947 – 17 May 2017) was a Norwegian illustrator, children's writer and comics creator.

Morisse was raised in Oslo and was a brother of musician Bjørn Morisse. For many years he lived and worked in Sweden. He illustrated more than 300 books, especially children's books, by authors including Lennart Hellsing, Hans Pettersson, Bjørn Rønningen and Frid Ingulstad. His first drawings were published in Kamratposten during 1976. In 1982 he cooperated with Else Breen to create a book for deaf children, Den røde skammelen. In 1986, he started his own publishing house. In 2002, he received the Publicistklubben's Gold Pen (Årets Gullpenn). His comics album from 2007, based on the fairy tale The Giant Who Had No Heart in His Body, was nominated for the Sproing Award.
