= Eugen Johannessen =

Norwegian politician (1892–1975)

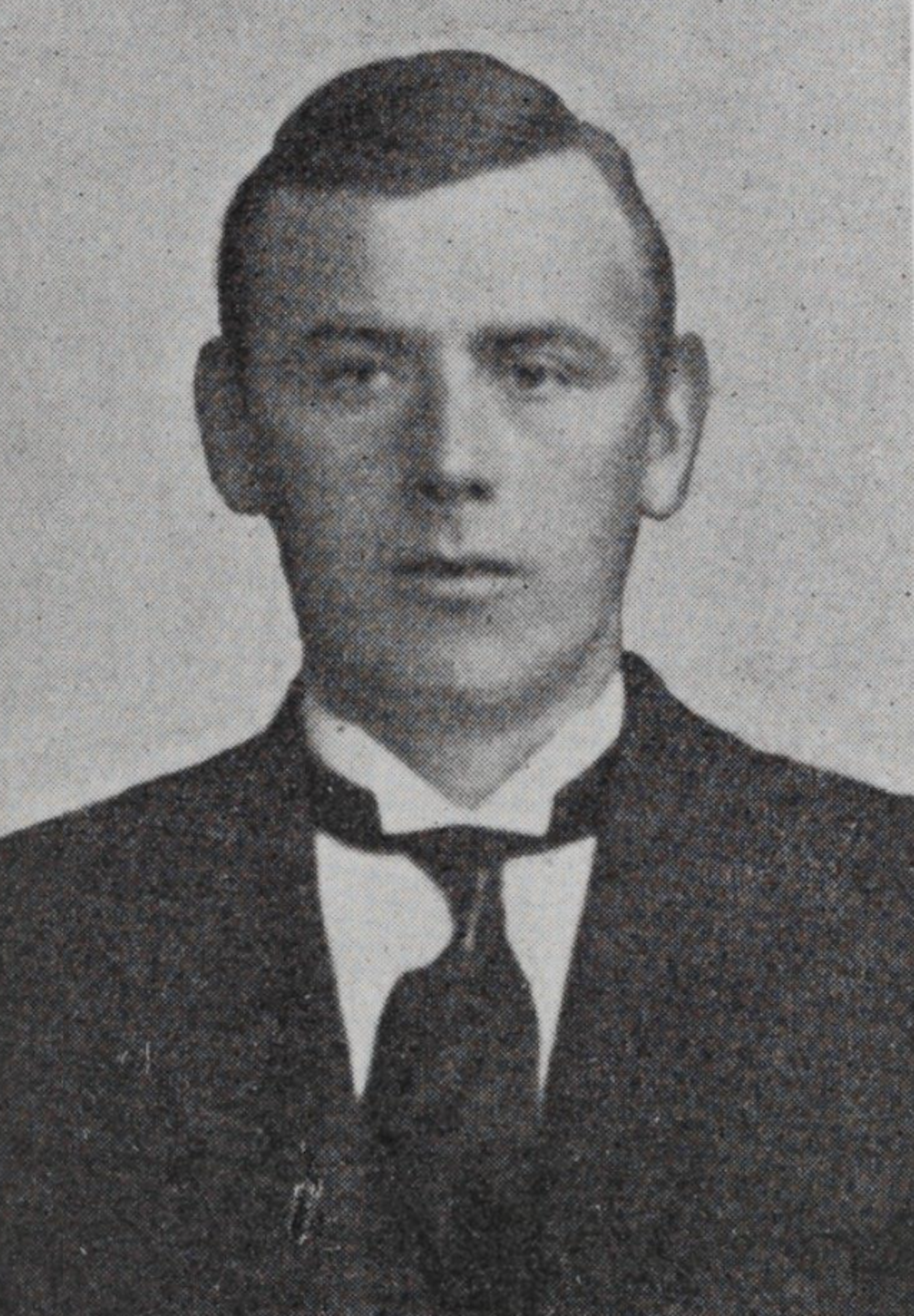
Eugen Johannessen

Eugen Monrad Johannessen (1892 – 1975) was a Norwegian politician for the Labour Party. He served in Oslo city council, but is best known for his work in the party organization. He was also known as a trade unionist, and as a resistance member during the Second World War.

== Career ==
He was born and grew up in Sakrisbråten in Maridalen. He was a manual laborer from a young age, joined his first trade union at the age of 16 and in 1912 he started working for the Public Roads Administration in Kristiania. He gradually advanced to inspector. He chaired his local union, and was also a board member of the Norwegian Union of Municipal Employees.

From 1920 to 1922 he was a member of the city council, but withdrew to work for the party organization. He was a deputy member of the central board from 1925 to 1927 and central board member from 1927 to 1949. He chaired the Labour Party in Oslo from 1934 to 1940, when World War II reached Norway and the party became forbidden during the occupation of Norway by Nazi Germany. Johannessen replaced the arrested Einar Gerhardsen in 1941 as leader of the illegal party committee. He was also a member of Hjemmefrontens Ledelse.

After the war, in 1945 he became the deputy leader of the Labour Party. He stepped down in the autumn of 1945, but led the electoral committee at the Labour Party national conventions in 1945 and 1949. He was a NATO supporter. He was a member of Oslo city council until 1967. He was awarded the Medal of St. Hallvard in 1967.
