= Øystein Sunde =

Norwegian musician

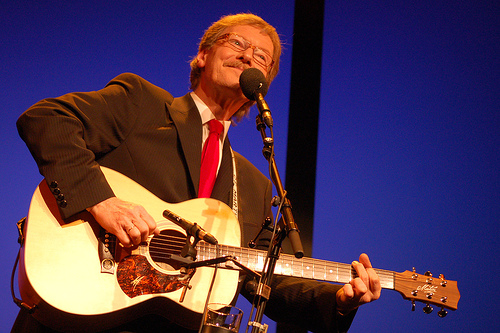
Øystein Sunde (2007)

Øystein Olaf Sunde (born 24 January 1947) is a Norwegian folk singer and guitarist. He is known for his high-speed guitar and banjo style and his satirical lyrics. Although often regarded as a comedian, Sunde is a versatile guitarist who has played with several Dixieland bands and jazz combos over the years.

== Early years ==
He was born 24 January 1947 in Oslo, but his family moved to Skarnes in 1954 where Sunde went to school. In 1955, the family moved back to Lambertseter in Oslo and Sunde continued school there. The same year he started playing piano, but he did not like this because he was forced to rehearse scales and partially because his teacher could play boogiewoogie and Sunde was not allowed to do so by his teacher. Despite protests from his parents he ended his piano playing career at the age of 7.

The next instrument Sunde played was a recorder but he started to cry after one hour, so he got a big grapefruit to comfort him, but after eating it he started to cry again. It was at this point his mother realized that he was not fit for playing this kind of instrument and later he started to play a B-Cornet. Even though Sunde did not quite find this instrument comfortable he played it for a few years mainly because he had failed so many times earlier.

When Sunde attended 6th grade his woodwork teacher made him make a mandolinlaika without any drawings. When finished, the instrument was too big but sounded magnificent. This was what caused Sunde to find music fun mainly because he was not forced to practice this instrument. Later Sunde bought a used guitar, and the mandolin was never used again.

In 1960 Sunde heard the song "Apache" played by The Shadows and he was "hooked". Later, at his confirmation, he got his first electric guitar. He dreamed of a Fender but it would take Sunde 11 years to get one. He also met one of his 'heroes' Chet Atkins in late 1971 who taught him some valuable lessons for 45 minutes.

Sunde attended the obligatory military service in the Norwegian Air Force base at Kolsås after basic training at Gardermoen. During his military training he wrote one of his hits "Fire melk og dagbla' for i går" on a boring night shift. After a while Sunde was allowed to postpone his military training to attend to "Schous Tekniske Institutt" for education. In 1969 he had to serve the remainder of his military training at Kolsås.

At the end of the sixties Sunde was working on an education as engineer. However, during a Norwegian class Sunde was bored and instead of paying attention he wrote one of his greatest hits, named "Jaktprat." "Jaktprat" is one of Øystein Sunde's most famous songs ever. Due to many positive responses to this song it was at this point in his life that Sunde realized that he was "on track" of something that he should continue doing.

After a successful cooperation with Mikkel Aas in late 1970 after releasing the LP "1001 Fnatt", who sold over 25000 copies, Sunde decided to drop education and work full-time as an entertainer.

== The start of a career ==
In 1976, Øystein Sunde moved back to Skarnes with his wife Gudrun, where he could pursue his hobbies, like model airplanes and garden golf.

Øystein Sunde became a part of the musician social environment in the capital, and he could often be found at the singer's club Dolphins with talented people like Kari Svendsen, Lillebjørn Nilsen, Ole Paus, Finn Kalvik and Hege Tunaal. He has played in bands like Hitch-Hikers, Hi-Five, Christiania Fusel & Blaagress and Gitarkameratene (with fellow guitarists Lillebjørn Nilsen, Halvdan Sivertsen and Jan Eggum), and he has participated in matinées, but he gained most fame as a solo artist. His lyrics are often about everyday situations from his own life, like nappy changing and model airplanes. He has said that he cannot write a song that contains no comic element. Expressions like "kjekt å ha" ("nice to have") have entered the Norwegian everyday language.

His recordings also include several instrumentals, like the folk tune Fanitullen or the high-speed, technical Ned Vøringsfossen (Down the Vøringsfossen Waterfall) and Lynavleder'n and the challenging Kulingbarsel.

Andreas Diesen once described Sunde as "a master with words and a great musical talent". "When describing Øystein Sunde, I can quote André Bjerke, who once said about himself that he 'was into words'. Sunde sings about the German caravan on Norwegian roads or about artisans at their worst - all with a lot of irony."

== Recognition ==
Øystein Sunde was the first Scandinavian to receive a signature model series from C. F. Martin & Company.

Sunde is by many considered one of Norway's finest guitarists, which has led to several myths about his skill. The most common is that Eric Clapton and/or Mark Knopfler is supposed to have said that Sunde is the world's best guitar player. Evidence of this myth is non-existent and it is similar to another myth involving Phil Keaggy and Jimi Hendrix. Jimi Hendrix is supposed to have said that Terry Kath is better than himself.

== Covers ==
A handful of Sunde's songs are covers of other artists.

| Songname | Original Artist | Original Songname |
|---|---|---|
| Fordommens År | Jack Yellen, George L. Cobb | Alabama Jubilee |
| Sett deg i armkroken min | Flatt & Scruggs | Roll in My Sweet Baby's Arms |
| Kjepper i romhjula | Roger Miller | You Can't Rollerskate in a Buffalo Herd |
| Det ække lett å værra kuul | Shel Silverstein | It Doesn't Pay to Be Hip |
| Klå | Jerry Reed | The Claw |
| Lynavleder'n | Jerry Reed | Lightning Rod |
| På kne over fisketorget | Jerry Reed | Jerry's Breakdown |
| Flyver'n | Jerry Reed | Swinging 69 |
| Jentelei | Jerry Reed | Woman Shy |
| 127 Vannrett | Jerry Reed | Stump Water |
| De Hebraiske Alper | Trad. | Black Mountain Rag |
| 60 om da'n | Roger Miller, Curley Putman | Dad Blame Anything a Man Can't Quit |
| Åna Sira | Louis Prima | Buona Sera |
| Hei, Henry Ford | Dick Feller | Lord, Mr. Ford |
| Liten og grønn | Steve Goodman | City of New Orleans |
| Onkel'n til Per Erik | The Beatles | Lady Madonna |
| Bokreol | Elvis Presley | King Creole |
| Sjåfør (Skynd deg hjem før det snør) | Johnny Otis | Willie and the Hand Jive |
| Nå har'u fått meg | The Kinks | You Really Got Me |
| En liten beta blues | Jerry Reed | A Little Bit of Blues |
| Ikke no' spesielt sted å dra | Chuck Berry | No Particular Place to Go |
| Jeg er min egen bestefar | Dwight Latham and Moe Jaffe | I'm My Own Grandpa |
| Den aller største noen noensinne hadde sett | The Dillards | The Biggest Whatever |
| Her, der og stikkelsbær | The Beatles | Here, There and Everywhere |

== Publications ==
=== Music ===
==== Albums ====
- 1001 Fnatt (1970)
- Det året det var så bratt (1971)
- Ikke bare tyll (1974)
- Klå (1974)
- På sangens vinger (1976)
- Hærtata hørt (1979)
- Barkebille Boogie (1981)
- I husbukkens tegn (1984)
- Overbuljongterningpakkmesterassistent (1986)
- Kjekt å ha (featuring Béla Fleck, recorded in Nashville) (1989)
- Du må'kke komme her og komme her (1994)
- Nå er begeret nådd (1999)
- Sånn er'e bare (2005)
- Meget i sløyd (2008)
- Bestefar (2016)

==== Compilation Albums ====
- Øystein Sundes beste (1977)
- Øystein Sunde i boks (1985)
- Øystein Sundes 40 beste (1990)
- Sundes Verden (2006)
- Sundes 5 første (2012)

==== Special albums for the Swedish market ====
- Sunderfundigheter (1973)
- Hurtbuller i hvit saus (1975)

=== With Christiania Fusel & Blaagress ===
- Som varmt hvetebrød i tørt gress (1972)

=== Books with lyrics and sheet music for his own songs ===
- Viser uten slips (1972)
- Kjekt å ha–1 (1990)
- Kjekkere å ha–2 (1992)
- Du må'kke komme her og komme her (1997)
- Sånn Er'e Bare (2005)

== See also ==
- Ordentlig Radio – An Internet radio station with Norwegian music started by Sunde and others.
