= Aksel Arstal =

Norwegian theologian, geographer, and teacher

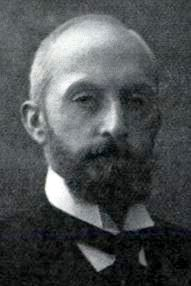
- Born: Aksel Kristian Andersen; 25 August 1855; Christiania, Norway
- Died: 28 November 1940 (aged 85)
- Occupation: Geographer
- Relatives: Hildur Andersen (sister)

Aksel Kristian Andersen Arstal (25 August 1855 – 28 November 1940) was a Norwegian theologian, schoolteacher and geographer.

He was born in Christiania (Oslo) to city engineer Oluf Martin Andersen and Annette Fredrikke Sontum, and was a brother of pianist Hildur Andersen.

He graduated as cand.theol. in 1876 from University of Oslo, worked as schoolteacher at various private schools, eventually as geography teacher at the Oslo Commerce School, and lectured in political geography at the university. His works on geography include Landomrids (1886), Geografi for Middelskolen (1899) and Norges økonomiske Geografi (1902). He edited Forældre og Børn (1902), a work on parents and children which had a large number of prominent contributors. Arstal edited the first edition of the encyclopedia Oslo byleksikon, which was published in 1938, a work which had taken several years to accomplish.

He died in November 1940.
