= Hildur Andersen =

Norwegian pianist and music pedagogue (1864–1956)

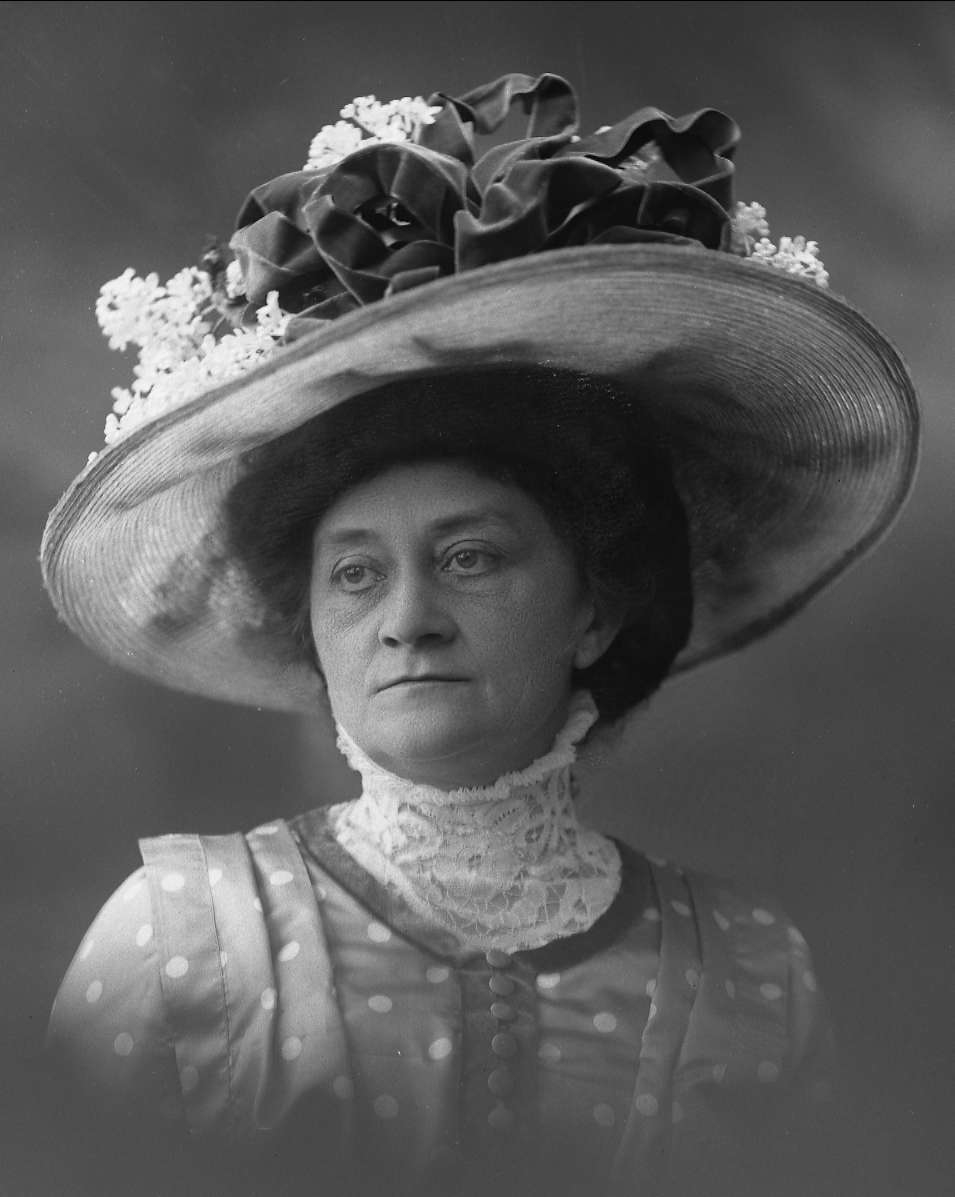
- Hildur Andersen (1909)
- Born: 25 May 1864; Christiania, Norway
- Died: 20 December 1956 (aged 92)
- Occupations: Pianist; Pedagogue
- Relatives: Aksel Arstal (brother)
- Awards: King's Medal of Merit in gold

Hildur Andersen (25 May 1864 – 20 December 1956) was a Norwegian pianist and music pedagogue.

She was born in Christiania to stadsingeniør Oluf Martin Andersen and Annette Fredrikke Sontum, and was a sister of geographer Aksel Arstal. She made her concert debut in Kristiania in 1886.

She is known both as a concert pianist and for her music lectures. She had a close friendship with playwright Henrik Ibsen, and is regarded to be the model for the character "Hilde Wangel" in Ibsen's play The Master Builder. She was awarded the King's Medal of Merit in gold in 1924.

== Awards ==
- The King's Medal of Merit in Gold 1924
- Cæciliaforeningen honorary member
- State artist's salary 1946
