= Arno Berg =

Norwegian architect

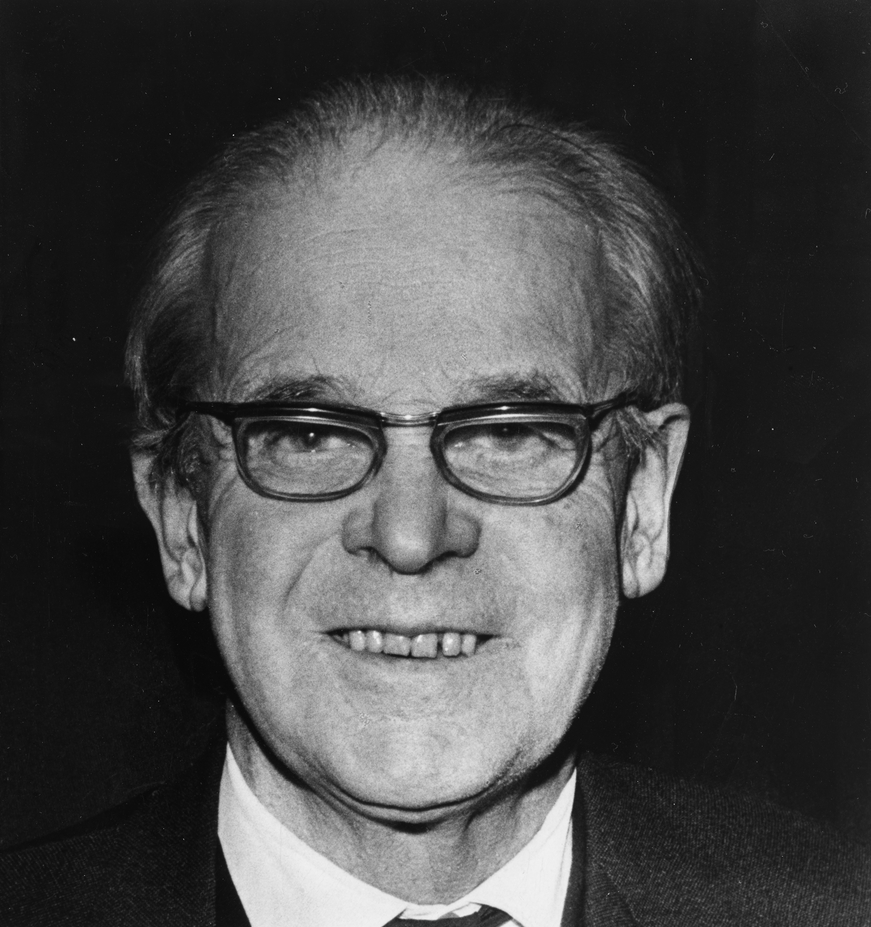
- Arno Berg in 1970
- Born: 14 February 1890; Gothenburg, Sweden
- Died: 1 June 1974 (aged 84); Oslo, Norway
- Education: Royal Institute of Technology
- Occupations: Architect and antiquarian
- Children: Knut Berg
- Awards: Medal of St. Hallvard; Order of St. Olav

Arno Berg (14 February 1890 – 1 June 1974) was a Swedish born, Norwegian architect and antiquarian. Berg is particularly associated with the preservation of historic building in Oslo.

== Biography ==
Berg was born in Gothenburg, Sweden. He was the son of Edvard Berg (1859–1912) and Clarita Krüger (1865–1926). He graduated from the Royal Institute of Technology in Stockholm in 1914. He was initially employed by architects Andreas Hesselberg Bjercke (1883-1967) and Georg Christen Eliassen (1880-1964) who at this time had won an architectural competition for the entry of a new office building for the head office of Norwegian America Line (Den norske Amerikalinje) in Oslo.

Berg worked at the Norwegian Museum of Cultural History in Oslo from 1918 to 1927. He was then contacted by city architect Harald Aars (1875-1945) and asked to be a secretary of the heritage association Selskabet for Oslo Byes Vel. He also became editor of the periodical St. Hallvard which was published by the association. Additionally he wrote articles and book reviews for the publication.

Berg was the first head of the department for cultural heritage in Oslo, serving from 1956 to 1960. The preservation of Basarhallene at Oslo Cathedral, buildings in Homansbyen and Karl Johans gate, as well as the restoration of Oslo Ladegård and Akershus Fortress were all focuses of his attention. Among his publications are Selskabet for Oslo Byes Vels historie 1811–1861 from 1936, Vår Frelsers kirke from 1950, and a two-volume work on Akershus Fortress.

Arno Berg was an honorary member of several organizations and was invited to be a member of the Norwegian Academy of Science and Letters. He was awarded the Medal of St. Hallvard and was decorated Commander of the Order of St. Olav. Arno Bergs plass in Oslo was named in his honor. A bust of Arno Berg by sculptor Arnold Haukeland was unveiled at Oslo Ladegård in 1972.

== Selected works ==
- Akershus slott i 1600–1700-årene, 1950
- Vår Frelsers Kirke, 1950
- Bygdøy kongsgård, 1952
- Det gamle Christiania, 1965
