= Christiania Fusel & Blaagress =

Norwegian musical group

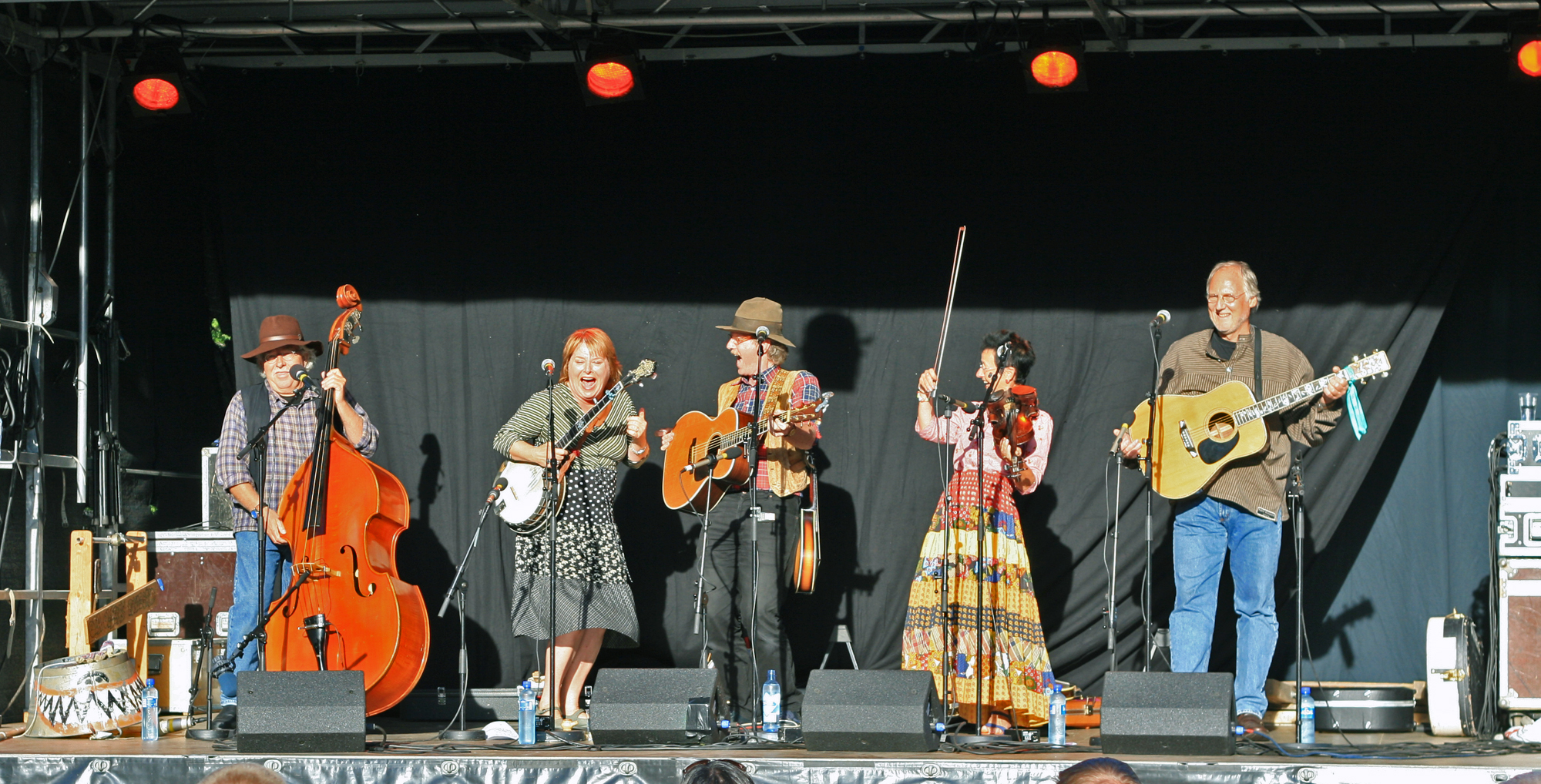
Christiania Fusel & Blaagress in Larvik, 2008

Christiania Fusel & Blaagress was a band started at Øystein Sunde's home after an evening at the Dolphin Club in Oslo on February 18, 1968. Its first performance was on February 22 the same year. The original membership of the band was:

- Kari Svendsen (banjo, tuba/baritone)
- Gerd Gudding (fiddle)
- Anne Elisenberg (fiddle, washboard)
- Fredrik Wibe (bass, washtub bass)
- Kåre Schanche (guitar)
- Øystein Sunde (guitar, mandolin)

The band performed live for many years but released only one single, "Det kjem nok betre tider" / "Mamma vi’kke ha" (Better Times a-Comin' / Mama Don't Allow), and one album, Som varmt hvetebrød i tørt gress (Like Hotcakes in Dry Grass).
