= Siri Nilsen =

Norwegian singer (born 1985)

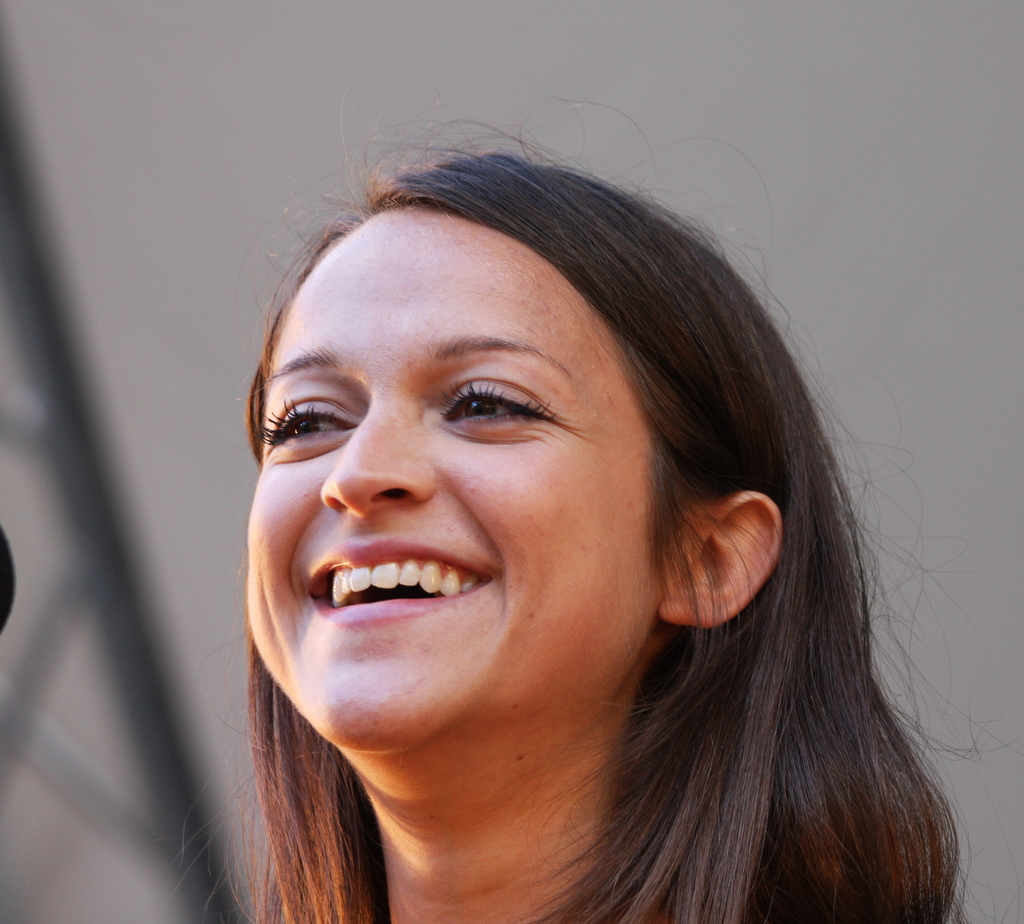
- Siri Nilsen at Oslo Bokfestival (Oslo Book Festival) September 2010

Background information
- Born: Siri Anne Nilsen; 12 April 1985 (age 41)
- Origin: Oslo, Norway
- Genres: Folk, pop
- Occupations: Singer, songwriter, musician, voice actress
- Instruments: Vocals, ukulele, guitar, piano
- Years active: 2007 – current
- Label: Grappa
- Website: www.sirinilsen.no (in Norwegian)

Siri Anne Nilsen (born 12 April 1985) is a Norwegian singer-songwriter and voice actress. "As the daughter of two folksingers, Lillebjørn and Shari Nilsen, she grew up surrounded by music." Nilsen is noted for the sincerity of her song writing and the clarity and range of her voice, characterized as "unique" and "beautiful". During her first two albums she often accompanied her singing with a ukulele, which she plays in a fingerpicking style.

Nilsen made her stage debut in 2007, and she was nominated for a Norwegian Grammy in the category of Best Female Artist in December, 2011. Nilsen has had a career for several years as a voice actress, dubbing character roles into Norwegian for several feature films and television, mostly animation.

== Biography ==
Siri Nilsen was born in Oslo, Norway where she grew up in the borough of Sagene. As a child she appeared in two Norwegian films, one of which, Maja Steinansikt (1996), she co-starred in.

Before deciding to devote herself to music as a career at around the age of twenty, Nilsen was a ballet dancer. At that time she turned to a "secret notebook full of songs that she had been compiling since her early teens" to express herself as an artist. Nilsen first performed publicly at Den Gode Kafe (The Good Cafe) in Oslo, April 2007.

In October 2008, Nilsen won a competition among new artists sponsored by the Norwegian record label, Grappa. In awarding Nilsen the prize for best debut artist, the jury described her as having "the courage to write simple, personal and intimate lyrics in Norwegian". As part of the award, Nilsen received a record contract which produced 2009's Vi som ser i mørket (We Who See in the Dark).

As a voice actress in Norwegian-version feature films and television, Nilsen played Carmen Cortez in Småspioner 2 (Spy Kids 2: The Island of Lost Dreams), Lisa Simpson in The Simpsons Movie, Haru in Katteprinsen (猫の恩返し Neko no Ongaeshi/The Cat Returns), among others.

=== Vi som ser i mørket (We Who See in the Dark) ===
Released on 5 October 2009, Nilsen's first record, Vi som ser i mørket (We Who See in the Dark), features songs written mostly in Norwegian, but also in English (Nilsen has mentioned that her American mother found it difficult to not want to proofread her English lyrics). The album was produced by musician Jan Martin Smørdal. Music critics were similar in their appraisal of Nilsen's voice and lyrics. Norway's largest newspaper, Aftenposten described Nilsen as "an artist who had already found her own voice." It described her music as ranging from "sensitive melancholy moods to light and playful tones", and "imparting joy and peace of mind.." Nilsen's lyrics are often described as "personal". Remarking on this Nilsen has said that her songs are not completely just about herself but can also be about things that she's observed or heard from others:

Each song is like a small movie, a little history...Part of me is going to be in there for it to be interesting to sing about. As a person I am a little mysterious, a little direct, and so is my music too.

=== Alle snakker sant (They All Speak the Truth) ===
Siri Nilsen's second album, Alle snakker sant (They All Speak the Truth), was released 11 November 2011. To produce, Nilsen collaborated with musicians Jens Carelius (a solo artist also part of the group "Blues Run the Game," with Siri Nilsen) and Øyvind Røsrud Gundersen (of the groups Rumble in Rhodos, Hanne Kolstø) both of whom play on the record. Nilsen plays piano, Rhodes piano, guitar, percussion, ukulele and mini-ukulele on the tracks. The album has been described as having a "distinctly modern tone". Nilsen explained that the title (of the album and single) "They All Speak the Truth" refers to reconciling one's gut feeling with the other messages received from the head and heart; concluding that all three speak the truth.

Nilsen wrote the songs in the dead of winter. She said that at the time the words were meant to comfort her, but by early summer when she recorded them she was already in a different mindset (The tracks were recorded at a rehearsal room next to where she lives).

oh, how to make roses grow through a long winter when you live so far north
how to feed birds that don’t dare to come near
how to believe in love when you know what it’s like
oh, such simple things

— translated verse of "Enkle ting" (Simple Things) — song from Alle snakker sant

Aftenposten characterized the album's lyrics as "well written and honest". Nilsen was described by one album reviewer as being "remarkably adept at combining bright colors with subtle hints of darkness," adding, "this usually prevents this light, nimble music from becoming overly cute."

Similar to the previous album, many reviewers focused on Nilsen's voice. The single, "Alle snakker sant", received praise in the pages of The Guardian and among Norwegian music critics. The album was released in the UK on 9 April 2012.

=== Skyggebokser (Shadow Boxer) ===
Released in autumn 2014, the album's title "refers to recurring themes in her work: the dichotomy of not feeling entirely present in your own life, and the feeling of having to fight against different aspects of yourself, while at the same time being drawn to what is fragile and raw." Nilsen describes these songs as "more mature, darker", and the ukulele is almost completely absent.

=== Other work ===
Nilsen released Siri Nilsen: Live fra Rockefeller Music Hall (Siri Nilsen: Live from Rockefeller Music Hall) in August 2012. The tracks were recorded during her concert at the Rockefeller in Oslo the previous March, and features 12 tracks.

Siri Nilsen appears on the Susanna single, "Death Hanging", along with Susanne Sundfør. It was released worldwide on 24 May 2013.

== Performer ==
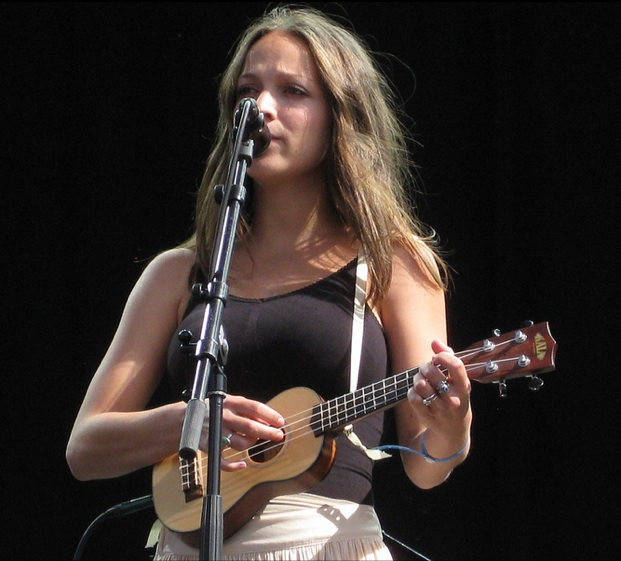
Siri Nilsen with ukulele performing at the annual Øyafestivalen (Island festival) in Oslo, 10 August 2012. One writer described Nilsen's style as "a fascinating hybrid of melancholy, vulnerable sweetness and inner strength..."

In addition to her solo career, Nilsen is part of the Oslo-based musician and poet community, "Blues Run The Game," together with musicians Arild Hammerø and Jens Carelius, among others.

Nilsen sometimes incorporates effects pedals as part of her singing. The pedals enable her to sample elements of her singing which she then loops as a backing track while singing lead.

On 15 December 2011 it was announced that Siri Nilsen had been nominated for a Spellemannprisen (Norwegian Grammy) in the category of Best Female Artist for her album, Alle snakker sant – with the award ceremony being conducted at the National Theatre in Oslo on 14 January 2012.

Nilsen performed at the annual Øyafestivalen (Island festival) on 10 August 2012. The music festival is held at Middelalderparken (Medieval park) in Nilsen's hometown of Oslo, Norway. Nilsen had previously performed there as a backing singer for Jens Carelius. The festival features four stages, and during Nilsen's opening song, "Ta meg med" (Take me with you), it was possible to hear the soundcheck of the black metal band, Nekromantheon, but Nilsen seemed unaffected. Among concert reviews, Nilsen was described by one writer as "a fascinating hybrid of melancholy, vulnerable sweetness and inner strength..." This was Nilsen's first concert since the Rockefeller in March 2012, and since giving birth to a daughter two months previous. Commenting on the most recent phase of her life, Nilsen said, "Now I've also got a million new things to write about, there's so much I want to say."

Nilsen is described as having a "strong artistic presence" and a voice which has a "large register", which is "comfortably clear" with a "steady top and powerful down." Concert reviews of Nilsen's live performances note the clear softness of her voice juxtaposed against her vocal power; and that she can convey more dimensionality with her voice live than what comes across on digitized recordings.

Nilsen performed at the SPOT music festival in Århus, Denmark on 3 May 2013 backed by an orchestra of 30–40 musicians performing some of Nilsen's music such as "Brev" and "Snu, Ikke Snu."

== Personal life ==
When I was younger, I missed being able to hear music from my own time in my own language, so it felt natural for me to start writing my songs in Norwegian. I feel that I can express more nuances in the language I use in my everyday life. Some people might say that Norwegian is not a very musical language, but I think that's an advantage, as it lets me concentrate more on the meaning of the words rather than on the sounds themselves. I think each language has its own way of being poetic. And I think Norwegian is very beautiful in its own way.

-Siri Nilsen

As the daughter of folksingers, Nilsen grew up around music. Her father is Lillebjørn Nilsen (born 1950 Oslo, Norway) who first came to prominence in Norway in the early 1970s after the release of his first albums, and her mother is Shari Nilsen, who is American. Siri Nilsen first wrote a song when she was six years old, but grew up sheltered from the different aspects of the music industry. Lillebjørn tells an anecdote illustrating this point: one day Siri and her sister came home from school and sang a song to their father that they had learned that day, never realizing that it was he who had written it. (Lillebjørn Nilsen wrote a popular song/guitar book that has been in print for decades).

In November 2011, Nilsen performed with her father on the Norwegian late-night talk show, Senkveld med Thomas og Harald (Late Night with Thomas and Harald). She sang the single Alle snakker sant and played the ukulele while Lillebjørn accompanied on ukulele.

In June 2012, Siri Nilsen gave birth to a daughter with Norwegian actor and comedian Anders Bye, with whom she has been in a relationship for several years.

== Honors ==
- 2014: Spellemannprisen in the class best lyricist, for the album Skyggebokser

== Discography ==
=== Albums ===
Year	Album	Peak positions	Certification
Year	Album	NOR	Certification
2009	Vi som ser i mørket	–	
2011	Alle snakker sant	7	
2014	Skyggebokser	17	

Live albums

- 2012: Siri Nilsen: Live fra Rockefeller Music Hall

=== Singles ===
Year	Album	Peak positions	Certification
Year	Album	NOR	Certification
2011	"Alle snakker sant"	3	Alle snakker sant

Featured in

- 2013: "Death Hanging" (Susanna feat. Siri Nilsen & Susanne Sundfør)

== Voice acting roles ==
Film and television roles – Norwegian dubbing	Role	Year			
Alvin og gjengen 3 (Alvin and the Chipmunks: Chipwrecked)	Brittany	2011			
My Little Pony: Vennskap er ren magi (My Little Pony: Friendship Is Magic)	Applejack	2010			
Winx Club: Kongerikets hemmelighet (Winx Club: The Secret of the Lost Kingdom)	Bloom	2010			
Marmaduke (Marmaduke)	Barbara	2010			
Star Wars: The Clone Wars (Star Wars: The Clone Wars)	Ahsoka "Snips" Tano	2008			
Drømmehagen (In the Night Garden...) -television series-		2007			
Edgar og Ellen (Edgar & Ellen) -television series-		2007			
Jungeldyret Hugo på ville veier		2007			
Sykkelmyggen og dansemyggen		2007			
Phineas og Ferb (Phineas and Ferb)	Candace Flynn	2007			
Kikis budservice (Kiki's Delivery Service)	Kiki	2007			
The Simpsons Movie (The Simpsons Movie)	Lisa Simpson	2007			
Avatar: Den Siste Lufttemmeren (Avatar: The Last Airbender)	Azula, Toph Beifong	2005			
Tommys ville venner (Pet Alien) -television series-		2005			
Katteprinsen (猫の恩返し Neko no Ongaeshi/The Cat Returns)	Haru	2005			
De Utrolige (The Incredibles)	Kari	2004			
Peter Pan: Tilbake til drømmeland (Return to Never Land)	Jane	2002			
Småspioner 2: Operasjon drømmeøya (Spy Kids 2: Island of Lost Dreams)	Carmen Cortez	2002			
Den ville familien Thornberry (The Wild Thornberrys Movie)	Sarah Wellington	2002			
Kim Possible (Kim Possible)	Bonnie Rockwaller	2002			
Pokémon 3: The Movie (Pokémon 3: The Movie)	Molly Hale	2001			
Ender uten tenner (Sitting Ducks) -television series-		2001			
Furi og den magiske skogen (El Bosque Animado)		2001			
Lady og landstrykeren 2 – Fant på eventyr (Lady and the Tramp II: Scamp's Adventure)	Danielle	2001			
Jimmy Neutron: Geniet (Jimmy Neutron: Boy Genius)	Cindy Vortex	2001			
102 Dalmatians (102 Dalmatians)		2000			
Hjelp! Jeg er en fisk (Help! I'm a Fish)	Stella	2000			
Pokémon 2 – Den enes kraft (Pokémon: The Movie 2000)	Maren	2000			
Babar – Elefantenes konge (Babar: King of the Elephants)	B. Celeste	1999			
Pippi på Sjørøverøya		1999			
Madeline (Madeline)		1998			
Småkryp (A Bug's Life)		1998			
Løvenes konge 2 – Simbas stolthet (The Lion King II: Simba's Pride)	Young Kiara	1998	Kitty ikke katt (Kitty Is Not a Cat)	Kitty	2018
Maja Steinansikt *	Silvia	1996			
Over stork og stein *		1994			

live acting role in feature film *
