= Bakklandet Bassangforening =

Norwegian political humor musical group

Bakklandet Bassangforening (also called Det norske Mosartensemble) was a Norwegian political humor musical group that existed from 1975 to 1978.

== History ==
The background for the project was plans by the municipality of Trondheim to raze the old buildings in the Bakklandet neighborhood in order to build a new main road. These plans were met by strong opposition from the locals and led to young people and adults in Trondheim occupying houses in Bakklandet in the 1960s and 1970s. The musical group was started by the duo Knutsen & Ludvigsen and Gerd Gudding, and was later joined by Arve Tellefsen and Kaare Ørnung. They recorded the albums Ned med Nidaros and Du milde Mosart!, went on tour, and appeared on NRK several times with musical performances and skits. In 1978, the municipality's plans to build the new road were called off and the group broke up. In 2010, Bakklandet Bassangforening reunited with Øystein Dolmen, Gerd Gudding, Arve Tellefsen, and Kaare Ørnung at the Olav Hall in Trondheim with a large turnout. Today, Øystein Dolmen and Arve Tellefsen are the only surviving members of the group. In 1978, Arve Tellefsen won the Spellemannprisen (the "Norwegian Grammy Award") in the open class for the composition "Sindings fiolinkonsert" and the album Du milde Mosart! Many of Bakklandet Bassangforening's songs and skits are available on Knutsen & Ludvigsen's compilations and on the Knutsen & Ludvigsen DVDs.

== Members ==
- Øystein Dolmen: guitar, mandolin, singer, chorus, emcee
- Gustav Lorentzen: guitar, bass, tuba, singer, chorus, emcee
- Gerd Gudding: fiddle, bass, singer, chorus
- Arve Tellefsen: violin, sang, chorus
- Kaare Ørnung: piano, violin, singer, chorus

== Discography ==
- Ned med Nidaros (1975)
- Du milde Mosart! (1977)

=== With other groups ===
- Various: 12 Ess (1975)
- Various: Norsk på topp Vol. 4 (1976)
- Various: 12 originale norske topper (1976)
- Various: Knallgo'e låter Vol. 1 (1981)
- Knutsen & Ludvigsen: Knutsen & Ludvigsen samleplate (1984)
- Various: Trondhjæm, Trondhjæm, at æ reist ifra dæ... (1984)
- Various: Fine norske sommerlåter 1 (1993)
- Knutsen & Ludvigsen: Knutsen & Ludvigsens beste (1996)
- Various: Det beste av norsk musikk 1973–1977 (1998)
- Various: Æ e trønder æ (album)|Æ e trønder æ (2000)
- Various: Vi e' stolt (2007)
- Knutsen & Ludvigsen: Dum og deilig: Knutsen & Ludvigsens beste (2008)
- Knutsen & Ludvigsen: Knutsen & Ludvigsen komplett (2010)
- Various: Sorgenfrie øyeblikk Vol. 1 (2012)
- Various: Æ e trønder æ – Den beste trøndermusikken (2013)

== Television performances ==
- Knutsen & Ludvigsen inviterer til årsmøte i Bakklandet Bassangforening (1977)
- Etter Dagsrevyen (1978)
- Folk: Livet etter Ludvigsen (2011)
