= Dolphin Show =

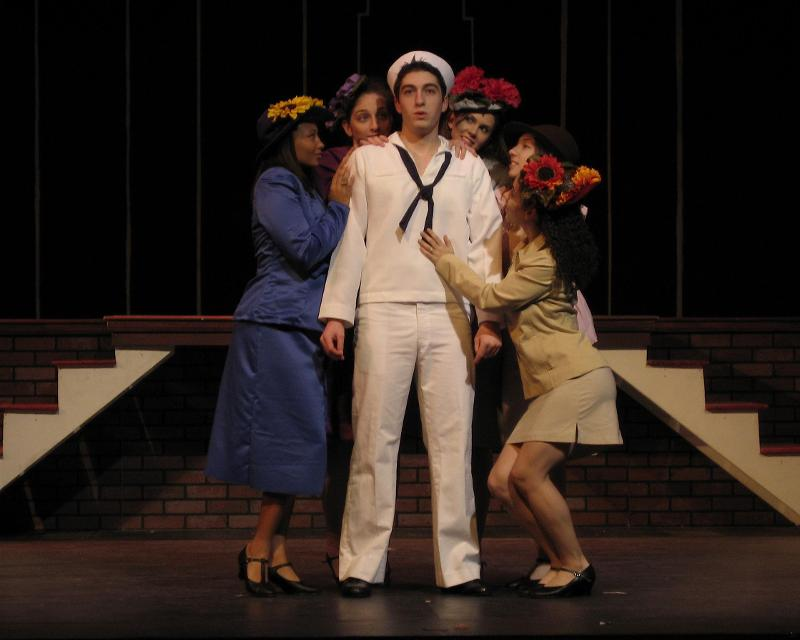
From 2006's On the Town, a musical written by Leonard Bernstein about sailors during World War II

The Dolphin Show is a non-profit student theatre organization that annually presents a large-scale student-produced musical theatre production at Northwestern University.

== History ==
A group of Northwestern University men formed the Dolphin Club in 1939 to compete in Chicago area swimming meets. In 1940, the 15-member team held a swim carnival to raise money to attend a meet in Florida. The carnival and the meet were both successful, so the water show was repeated in 1941 and 1942. When World War II forced the cancellation of the annual Waa-Mu Show, the club combined their tradition with some students from Waa-Mu to present an evening of song and dance called the Dolphin Show. The 1944 Dolphin Show was a musical revue called "Wela Kahau" including women's water ballet and the men's Dolphin Club. Proceeds from this show bought war bonds. In 1948 audiences returned to see a musical-comedy revue around the original Patten Gymnasium pool. The Dolphin Show became jointly produced by the female Lorelei swimming club in 1949, but drifted away from its aquatic origin. The Dolphin Executive Board gave equal representation to both clubs who chose a theme for each year's show. In 1963 the production was no longer raising funds for the swim clubs. In 1964 the show presented Gilbert and Sullivan's The Mikado around the pool. In 1970, the group performed the musical Mame on stage at Cahn Auditorium.

Alumni include actors David Schwimmer, Warren Beatty, Richard Kind, lyricist Sheldon Harnick, musical director Keith Dworkin, singer Ardis Krainik and Kate Shindle who was Miss America 1998.

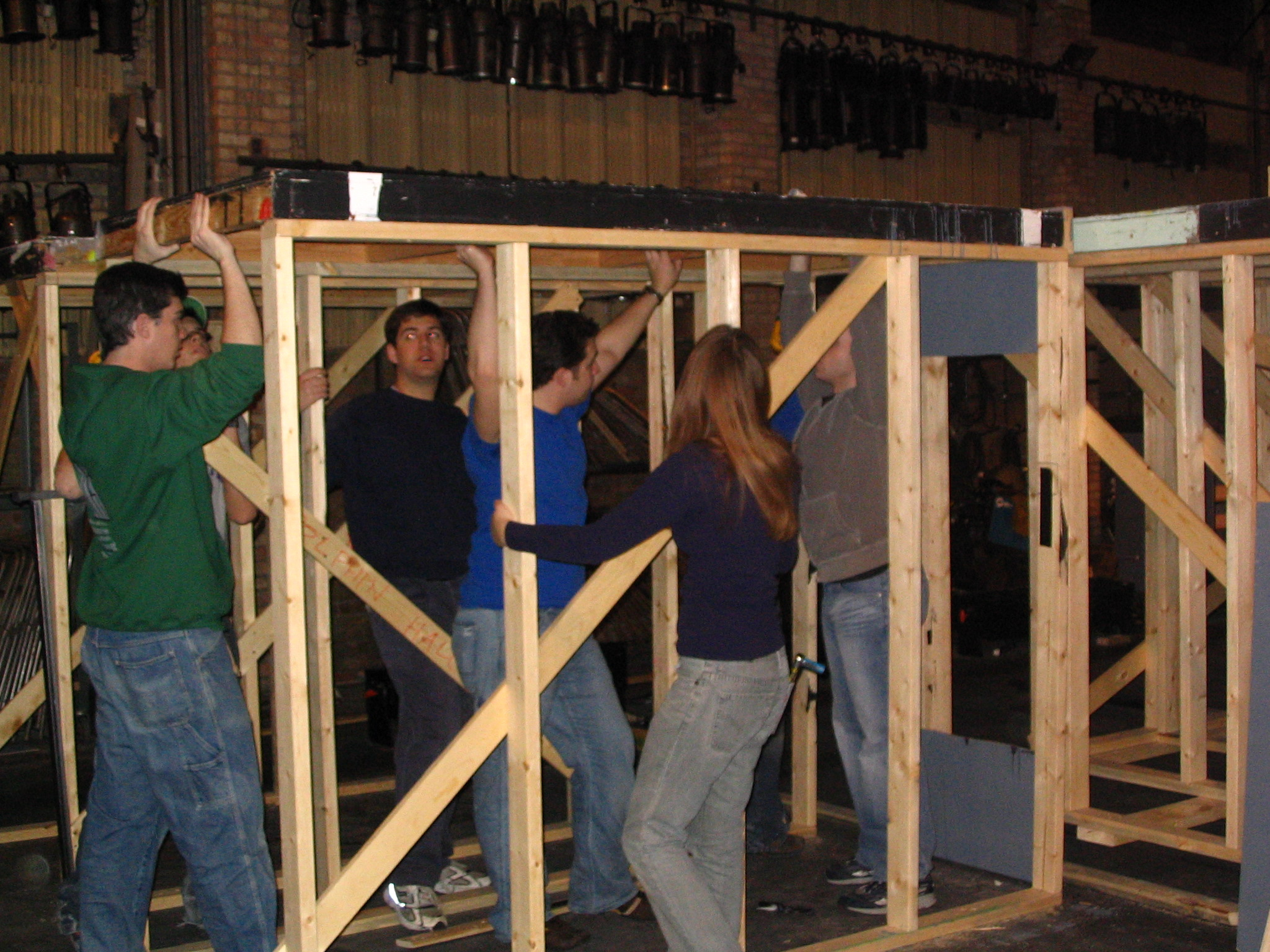
Striking the set of 2005's How to Succeed in Business Without Really Trying

== Shows ==
The productions have been awarded Northwestern University's Center for Student Involvement's "Outstanding Theatrical Production", "Outstanding Producers", and "Outstanding Director" awards, as well as William Daniels Awards, including "Best Musical."

Year	Show	Director	Producers	Music Director(s)	Choreographer(s)
2027	Newsies	Alex Lopez	Eliza Huang Jeffrey Rohr	Eloise Nelson Thomas Allen	Azalea Brown Sarah Schulkin
2026	Footloose	Katherine Horton	JingXi Yap Aiden Kaliner	Clara Shapiro Brandon Baade	Myah Shelton Marcella Tracy
2025	Rogers and Hammerstein's Cinderella	Rachel Rubin	Rachel Olkin Jiyeon "Jay" Jeon	Avery Powers Jordan Klein	Emily Thompson Mika Parisien
2024	Kinky Boots the Musical	Alexa Goldstein	Daniel Maton Ryan Nguyen Rachel Olkin	Otto Vogel	Lily Nevo
2023	Matilda the Musical	Lucy Harrington	Arella Flur Daniel Maton Rachel Schmaier	Kevin Park	Kristen Waagner
2022	Merrily We Roll Along	Nora Geffen	Owen Kiley; Simran Deokule	Cameron Miya; Shraman Ghosh	Sammi Tapper
2021	Pippin	Mary Tomei	Paia Amelio Emma Flanders Rachel Khutorsky	Ezri Killeen Lorenzo Pipino	Sammi Tapper
2019	Hello, Dolly!	Isabel Perry	Casey Watson; Andrew Harlan; Austin Manross	Joe Badion; Louis Danowsky	Tucker DeGregrory
2018	Ragtime	Michael Herwitz	Michael Kelleher; Prateek Singh	Noah Landis; Bryan Eng	Tucker DeGregrory
2017	Little Shop of Horrors	Maggie Monahan	Bailey Sutton; Janie Dickerson	Landon Hegedus; Matthew Burgess	Lauryn Schmelzer
2016	Gypsy	Aaron Simon Gross	Brandon Nadig; Alex Wolfe	Jonathan Bauerfeld; Geoffrey Ko	Rosie Jo Neddy
2015	Titanic	Brendan Flynn	Jack Eidson; Isabel Garcia	Jason Shuian; Andrea Swanson	
2014	Shrek the Musical	Marlee Rich	Rachel Marchant; Brandon Johnston	Ellen Morris; Adam Rothenberg	
2013	My Fair Lady	Tristan Powell	Louis Schermerhorn; Rachel Birnbaum	Ellen Morris; Kevin Scott	
2012	42nd Street	Emily Maltby	Jeremey Shpizner; Lucas McMahon	Patrick Sulken	
2011	Ragtime	Michael Holtzman	Julie Boor; Lucas McMahon	Liz Doran; Patrick Sulken	
2010	Parade	Scott G. Weinstein	Zachary Baer; Tom Casserly; Jamie Lynn White	Ian Weinberger	
2009	The Wizard of Oz	Katie Spelman	Zachary Baer; Tracy MacKenzie; Kyly Zakheim	Will Curry; Liz Doran	
2008	Carousel	Tyler G. Beattie	Brittney Anne Bahlman; Deanna Hope	Eugenio Vargas	
2007	Into the Woods	Travis Greisler	Dave Leuchter; Evyn Williams	Joel Esher	
2006	On the Town	Josh Penzell	Abra Chusid; Whitney Frick	Keith Dworkin	
2005	How to Succeed in Business Without Really Trying	Evan Brody	Abby Wolbe; Rachael Scholten		
2004	Gypsy: A Musical Fable	Sloan Grenz	Danna Ginsberg; Dana Oppenheim	Kristine Heiting	
2003	Evita	Jonathan Saylors	Chris Plevin; Amy Ludwigsen	Cory Hills; Daniel Singer	
2002	Damn Yankees	Jessica Redish	Megan Felsburg; Geeta Kharker	Greg Brown	
2001	The Secret Garden	Matthew Trombetta	Kate Webster; Karyn Meltz		
2000	Kiss of the Spider Woman	Mikie Garver	Claire Yoon and Kim Kelly		
1999	Guys and Dolls				
1998	Sweeney Todd				
