= Knut Are Tvedt =

Norwegian encyclopedist

Knut Are Tvedt (born 29 April 1952) is a Norwegian encyclopedist.

He is the editor of the encyclopedias Store norske leksikon and Oslo byleksikon. His main interests are the history and politics of Oslo.
