= Selskabet for Oslo Byes Vel =

Heritage association in Oslo, Norway

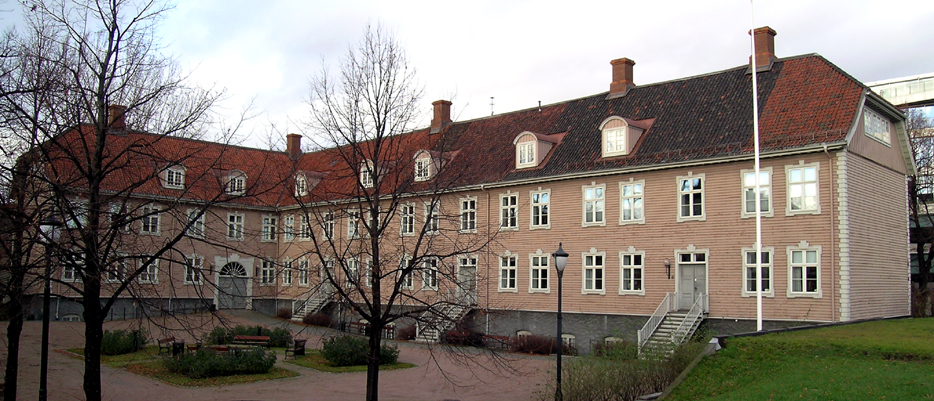
Headquarters at Grev Wedels plass.

Selskabet for Oslo Byes Vel (English: Society for the Welfare of Oslo), often known as Oslo Byes Vel, is a non-profit heritage association for the benefit of Oslo, Norway's capital city. It was established in 1811 by Niels Wulfsberg.

== History ==
Niels Wulfsberg founded the association on 29 May 1811. It was initially named "Selskabet for Christiania Byes Vel", and was organised in seven commissions. Its first urban political cause was the establishment of a university in Christiania (now Oslo). A university was opened on 2 September the same year, named Det Kongelige Frederiks Universitet (Royal Frederick University). Christiania Byes Vel also issued a periodical, Den Norske Borgerven ("The Norwegian Citizen's Friend"), discontinued after seven installments.

In 1819, Oslo's first public park was opened thanks to the association's initiative. In the following years, Christiania Byes Vel advocated political reforms such as water purification and the construction of green valleys along the city's approach roads. Poet Henrik Wergeland joined the association in 1838, which started printing his enlightenment letter For Arbeidsklassen ("For the Working Class").

In 1842, the association started handing out a medal to citizens who had served the city in a special manner. However, in 1867, it reduced the number of medals given, since there were reportedly too many given. The association celebrated its centennial anniversary in 1911, and had in the meantime changed its name to "Kristiania Byes Vel".

In 1915, Kristiania Byes Vel started publishing the periodical St. Hallvard. The initial editors were Edvard Bull and Anton Wilhelm Brøgger. The publication of St. Hallvard was ceased for a short period of time in 1923. One year later, the city experienced a name shift, from Kristiania to Oslo. In 1927, following the advice of the architect Harald Aars, the antiquarian Arno Berg agreed to take the role as head of Oslo Byes Vel, where he stayed for the remainder of his active life. He also wrote around 450 articles and book reviews for St. Hallvard, even after his retirement.

Oslo Byes Vel celebrated its 150-years anniversary in 1961, and donated the sculpture Dynamikk by Arnold Haukeland to the city. In 1982, the association was awarded the Oslo City art award for its contributions to architecture in the city. The third edition of Oslo byleksikon ("Oslo City Encyclopedia") was published in 1987 in cooperation between Oslo Byes Vel and Kunnskapsforlaget.

In 1989, Oslo Byes Vel handed out the honorary award "Bypatrioten" for the first time, to major Rolf Stranger. The following year, the association launched its blue plaque programme for protected buildings. In 2001, a guide to the 250 plaques was published by the association. In 2010, Astrid Nøklebye Heiberg was appointed chair of Oslo Byes Vel, the first woman ever to head the association. The association celebrated its bicentennial anniversary in 2011.

== Association ==
The headquarters of Selskabet for Oslo Byes Vel are located at Grev Wedels plass in the Oslo city centre and are open on weekdays. As of 2011, Astrid Nøklebye Heiberg is the chairman of the association, whilst Ida Fossum Tønnessen is deputy chair. The association publishes the periodical St. Hallvard four times a year.
