= Kaia Huuse =

Norwegian singer and composer

- Also known as: Kaja Huuse
- Born: Karianne Risting Huuse; May 14, 1974 (age 51); Hedmark, Ringsaker Municipality, Norway
- Occupation(s): Singer, composer, lyricist
- Instrument: Vocal
- Years active: 1997–present
- Partner: Jan Eggum (1998–2014)
- Awards: Spellemann Award for Traditional Music (2004)

Karianne Risting Huuse, stage name Kaia Huuse (born 14 May 1974), is a Norwegian singer-songwriter.

== Personal life ==
She was born in Oslo, but grew up in Nes Municipality in Hedmark county. After attending Toneheim Folk High School she moved to Oslo.

She entered a relationship with fellow singer-songwriter Jan Eggum in 1998. He was more than 22 years her senior, a recurring theme in interviews. The couple had two children, but split up in 2014.

== Career ==
Having self-released Lille klovn in 1992, Huuse performed at clubs after moving to Oslo, which earned her a contract with the label Grappa Musikkforlag. Her first album De som kan noe annet (1998) was produced by Jan Eggum, and her second, Egentlig kunstner (1999) by Lars Martin Myhre. Huuse, Veslemøy Solberg and Anne Marie Giørtz also issued an album with lyrics by Aksel Sandemose, calling their group Jenter fra Jante.

She co-produced Mellom oss (2001) and Trist og fint (2004) with Frode Berntzen, who was also her guitarist. The latter album earned her a Spelleman Award in the singer-songwriter category.

Further albums Episoder (2008) and Onsdag (2009) were followed by a best-of album, Liten lykke (2011). She continued with Det eneste jeg vil and Fint å være rar (2014).
