= Jan Eggum =

Norwegian singer-songwriter

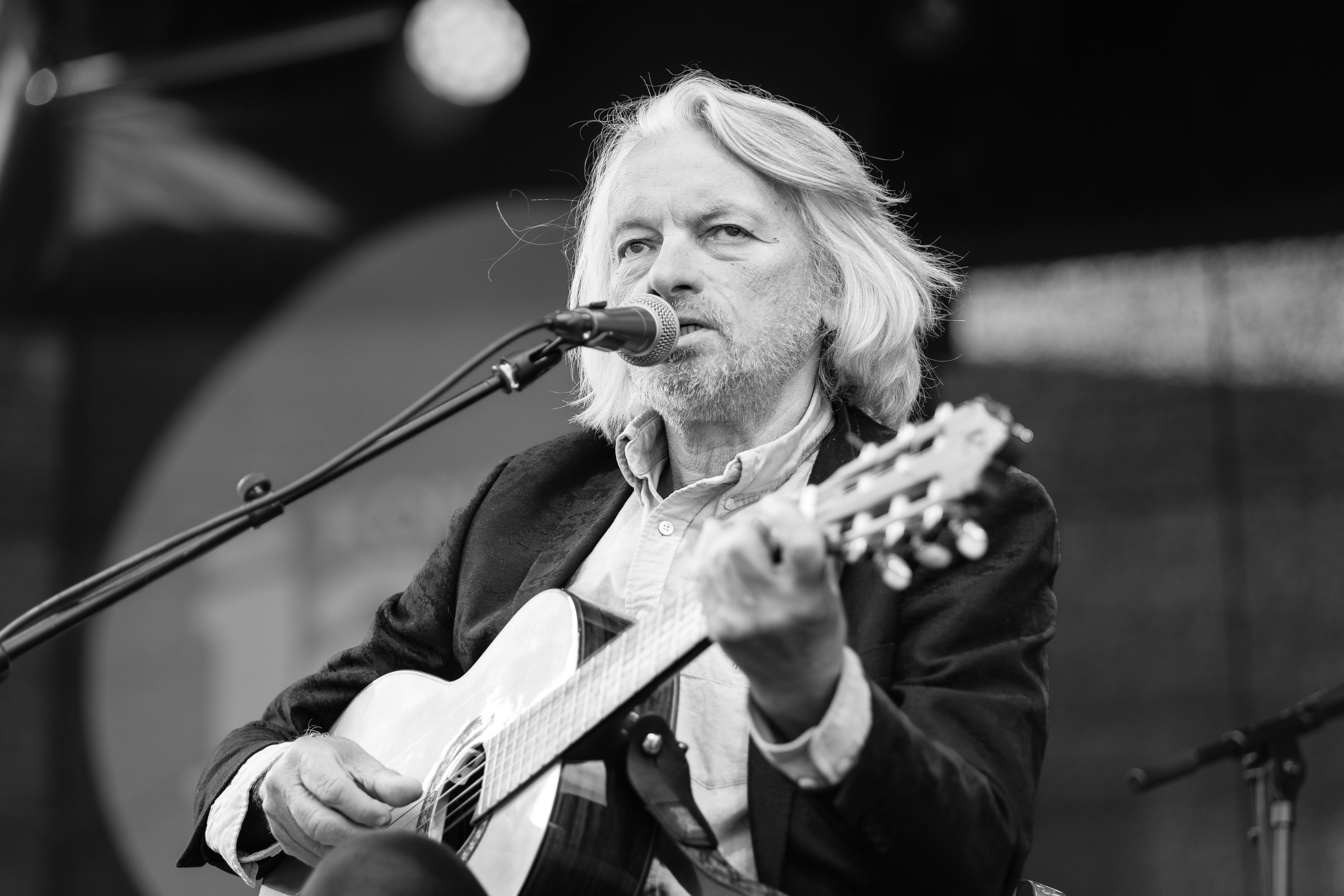
- Jan Eggum in a concert i 2022; Photo: Tore Sætre

Background information
- Born: 8 December 1951 (age 74); Bergen, Norway
- Genres: Pop, rock
- Occupations: Singer, songwriter
- Instruments: Guitar, bass guitar
- Years active: 1975–present
- Label: Grappa
- Formerly of: Gitarkameratene
- Website: janeggum.no

Jan Eggum (born 8 December 1951) is a Norwegian singer-songwriter. He has been characterized as a "face for the melancholy", and the themes in his songs often revolve around broken hearts, loneliness, and sorrow. Sometimes, his lyrics include social criticism, but he also reveals trivial and funny sides of himself.

== Career ==
Eggum was born in Bergen but started as a pub singer in London, making his living for two years writing songs in English. One of his most famous songs – "En natt forbi" ("A night is over") – was originally written in English under the title "Alone, Awake".

He obtained a record contract in 1975 with the Norwegian record company CBS and recorded his debut album, "Trubadur" that autumn. His breakthrough came after his third release, the album "Heksedans" in 1977. This album earned him the Norwegian award Spellemannsprisen, and includes such classics as "Mor, jeg vil tilbake".

Since this, Eggum has been one of Norway's most well known artists, both as a solo artist and with others. An example of the latter is his membership in Gitarkameratene with fellow guitarists Lillebjørn Nilsen, Øystein Sunde and Halvdan Sivertsen.

Eggum has been a minor political candidate for the Norwegian Green Party. He has three children, Frida (born 1980), Bastian (born 2006) and Hennika (born 2009).

=== Albums ===
- Jan Eggum (1975)
- Trubadur (1976)
- Heksedans (1977)
- En natt forbi (1979)
- En sang fra vest (1979)
- 5 år med Jan Eggum – 14 utvalgte sanger (1980)
- Alarmen går (1982)
- E.G.G.U.M. (1985)
- Da Capo (1990)
- Underveis (1991)
- Nesten ikke tilstede (1993)
- Mang slags kjærlighet (1994)
- Dingli bang (1997)
- Deilig (1999)
- Ekte Eggum (2001)
- President (2002)
- Alle gjør det (2004)
- 30/30 (2005)
- Hjerteknuser (2007)

=== Singles ===
- En sang fra vest / Kort opphold (1979)
- Alarmen går / Vest for Voss (1981)
- En helt ny dag / Sommeren nytes best om vinteren (1984)
- Utenfor (1988) (with Bjørn Eidsvåg, Sidsel Endresen, Silje Nergård)

=== With other artists ===
- Various artists: VisFestivalen Västervik 1978 (1978)
- Various artists: Norske viser i 70-åra (1980)
- United artists: Sammen for livet (1985)
- Various artists: Utenfor/Naken hud (1988)
- Gitarkameratene: Gitarkameratene (1989)
- Gitarkameratene: Typisk norsk (1990)
- Various artists: Æ – en tribute til Åge Aleksandersen (1992)
- Gustav Lorentzen: 1. klasse (1992)
- Various artists: Det beste av norsk musikk 1978–1980 (1998)
- Various artists: Solide saker – en hyllest til Dumdum Boys (1999)
- Vamp (band): En annen sol (2000)
- Various artists: Norske viseperler (2000)
- Various artists: Antons villfaring (2002) (Musical from Erlend Loe/Jan Eggum)
- Various artists: Gull i fra grønne skoger: Vidar Sandbeck (2003)
- Kaia Huuse: Trist og fint (2004)
- Various artists: Norsk rocks historie vol. 5: Viserock (1969–1977) (2004)
- Various artists: Venn (2005)

=== Eurovision Song Contest ===
- Deilige Drøm (1988) (ranked as number 10 in the Norwegian final)

== Bibliography ==
- Ugress i ditt bed (1977; Eide Forlag)
- Heksedans (1981; Eide Forlag)
- Mellom borger og bohem (1991; Eide Forlag)
- Mang slags kjærlighet – 40 sanger del 2 (1994; Blåmann Forlag)
- Dingli Bang (1997; Blåmann Forlag)
- Deilig (1999; Blåmann Forlag)
- Nesten den samme (tekster) (2000; Blåmann Forlag)
- Norsk pop- og rockleksikon (2005; Vega Forlag)
- Popminner – en reise i norsk pophistorie (2012; Vega Forlag), with Bård Ose
- Kor e alle helter hen? (2014; Kagge Forlag)
