= Keith Dworkin =

Keith Dworkin is the co-adaptor of The Frogs by Aristophanes that was performed off-off-Broadway by Rising Sun Performance Company. He is also the recipient of the 2006 William Daniels Award for best musical direction for his production of Urinetown., but is best known for his musical direction and co-adaption of Rodgers and Hart's The Boys From Syracuse with David Bell.
