= Gitarkameratene =

Norwegian musical group

- Origin: Norway
- Genres: Folk music, musical comedy
- Years active: 1987–2024
- Label: Grappa Musikkforlag
- Past members: Jan Eggum; Lillebjørn Nilsen; Halvdan Sivertsen; Øystein Sunde

Gitarkameratene (Norwegian: The Guitar Buddies) was a Norwegian folk and comedy music supergroup consisting of Lillebjørn Nilsen, Halvdan Sivertsen, Jan Eggum and Øystein Sunde. Originally formed in 1987, the group released two albums and toured extensively until 1994, followed by occasional reunion tours and sporadic appearances until their official disbandment following the death of Nilsen in 2024.

== History ==
The group was formed largely accidentally when folk singers Lillebjørn Nilsen, Halvdan Sivertsen and Øystein Sunde were scheduled to appear separately at a Sarpsborg music festival in 1987. Being friends and familiar with each others work already, they decided to hold an improptu concert together. Having enjoyed the experience, the three decided to continue the collaboration and invited friend and fellow musician Jan Eggum to make it a quartet. The following year the group released their first album, the epynomous "Gitarkameratene", a name suggested by Nilsen after their first idea, "Vinylkvartetten" (lit. The Vinyl Quartet) was deemed to be unclear. The album was highly successful, and the group embarked on a national tour before returning to the studio for their second album, "Typisk Norsk", which was released in 1989 and won Spellemannsprisen for "Best Folk Album" in 1990, during which they were also named "Group of the Year". The group continued touring regularly until 1994, which was bookended by several sold-out shows at Chateau Neuf in Oslo which were also recorded for broadcast on NRK.

After their 1994 tour ended, the members decided to focus on solo projects and didn't collaborate again until 2003, when they reunited to record a song for a Vidar Sandbeck tribute album. Despite their absence from touring and recording, the members insisted that the band hadn't broken up because "once a guitar buddy, always a guitar buddy!" (en gang gitarkamerat - alltid gitarkamerat!", a trademark phrase that also appeared on all their respective solo releases.

In 2010, sixteen years after they last tour together, the group announced a new reunion tour. Initially scheduled only to consist of a handful of concerts, it was quickly sold out and expanded to cover more cities and shows, eventually ending up becoming a series of yearly tours for the next four years. Alongside the first reunion tour the group also released a live album consisting of a complete previously-unheard 1990 concert recording from Grieghallen in Bergen, Norway.

Their 2013 tour was abruptly cut short in October after Nilsen collapsed during a concert in Bergen, in his own words at the time due to food poisoning, and the remaining six concerts were performed without Nilsen due to his health concerns. Years later, Nilsen revealed that the real reason for his collapse was that he had been drinking heavily due to anxiety over an upcoming surgery due to a recent cancer diagnosis. Eventually, health issues led the group to cease touring and limiting their performances to a yearly summer festival arranged by themselves, which was held successfully the next three years.

On 25 June 2016, the group played what would be their last concert together as a quartet, as Nilsen retired the following year due to increasing health issues. While Eggum, Sivertsen and Sunde continued to perform together, they refused to use the name "Gitarkameratene" without Nilsen on-stage with them. Nilsen died on 27 January 2024, aged 71, after ten years suffering from lung cancer and chronic obstructive pulmonary disease (COPD). At his funeral on 9 February, the remaining three members performed one of Nilsens songs and announced the group had disbanded.

=== Name controversy ===
Controversy arose in 2006 when four other Norwegian artists (Espen Lind, Kurt Nilsen, Askil Holm and Alejandro Fuentes) began touring and recording together, as the media referred to them as De nye Gitarkameratene ("The new guitar buddies"). While the four did not use the name officially, it was heavily used in the press, causing Lillebjørn Nilsen to send a letter of protest to Espen Lind, who replied and said that they had not used the name officially and that they actually did not feel comfortable with using the name themselves.

== Members ==
- Lillebjørn Nilsen - vocals, banjo, mandolin, fiddle, guitars, accordion
- Halvdan Sivertsen - vocals, guitars
- Jan Eggum - vocals, guitars, bass
- Øystein Sunde - vocals, guitars, bass

== Discography ==
- 1988: Gitarkameratene
- 1989: Typisk Norsk
- 2003: "Gull og grønne skoger" for the Vidar Sandbeck tribute album Gull og grønne skoger.
- 2010: Kanon - det beste fra Gitarkameratene Live! (recorded live in 1990)
