= Randolf Arnesen =

Norwegian politician (1880–1958)

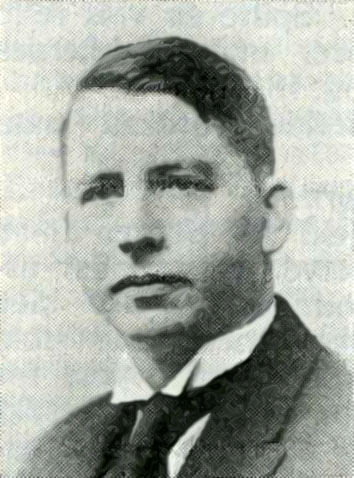

Personal details
- Born: 29 August 1880 Bergen, Norway
- Died: 25 May 1958 (aged 64)
- Party: Labour; Social Democratic Labour
- Occupation: Trade unionist; Cooperativist; Politician

Randolf Arnesen (29 August 1880 – 25 May 1958) was a Norwegian trade unionist, cooperativist and politician for the Labour and Social Democratic Labour parties.

He was born in Bergen. He was a co-founder of Norges Socialdemokratiske Ungdomsforbund, and was the deputy chairman from 1903 to 1904 and chairman from 1904 to 1905. In 1910 he was elected as a member of Kristiania city council, where he was a member of the executive committee for many years. He was a city council member until 1934. In the 1921 general election, Arnesen was the third ballot candidate for his new party, the Social Democratic Labour Party. He was the fifth candidate in 1924. He rejoined Labour in 1927, when it became reunited with the Social Democratic Labour Party.

He took education as a turner, and joined his trade union Jerndreiernes forening in Kristiania in 1900. He later chaired it from 1910 to 1911. He also chaired the cooperative at Thorshaug from 1909 to 1910. From 1911 to 1919 he was an under-secretary in the Labour Party, and from 1919 he edited Kooperatøren, the magazine of Norges Kooperative Landsforening where he was a secretary from 1919 to 1948 and board member. He also chaired the Norwegian Tenants' Association from 1915 to 1924, and wrote pamphlets on housing and cooperatives. From 1920 to 1922 he was a member of the national Housing Law Commission.

In 1956 he was among the first recipients of the Medal of St. Hallvard. He died in 1958.

Party political offices
Preceded by Carl Øien	Chairman of the Norges Socialdemokratiske Ungdomsforbund; 1904–1905	Succeeded by Ole Vold
