= Carl Just =

Norwegian journalist

Carl Just (10 September 1897 – 16 October 1990) was a Norwegian journalist.

== Early and personal life ==
He was born in Kristiania to the wholesaler Carl Johan Beckman (1871–1931) and his wife Selma Augusta Just (1877–1946). Just grew up in Kristiania with foster parents. He never met his father, but met his mother once in his adult life. He married Margaretha Aximia Lundqvist (1894–1969) in 1919.

== Career ==
In 1917–19, he worked as a journalist in the Norwegian newspaper Dagbladet. After that, he moved to Bergen, where he became editor-in-chief of Folkets Avis. From 1921 to 1928, he was an editor of the Christian newspaper Dagen. Thereafter, he worked in the news department of the broadcasting corporation in Bergen for two years. He edited Morgenbladet from 1928 to 1936. After a brief period in Bergens Aftenblad, Just became the editor-in-chief of a number of weekly magazines and yearbooks.

Just was the rector of the Norwegian Journalist Academy throughout its existence, from 1951 to 1964. From 1950 to 1965 he was also the editor of the Norwegian Trekking Association yearbook. He has published several books about journalism as well as the city of Oslo. In 1966 he was the editor of the second edition of the Oslo City Encyclopedia.
