= Hege Tunaal =

Norwegian singer (born 1948)

Hege Tunaal (born 17 June 1948) is a Norwegian singer.

She was born in Bærum. As a singer she reached national popularity in the 1970s, releasing albums such as Olje, brød og vin (1972) and Vide med vind (1974) and singles such as I Lover's Lane and Over broen (both 1973, charting at Norsktoppen). She won the Spellemannprisen together with Lars Klevstrand for the 1983 album Ola Skutvik og Mariann. Tunaal has also performed in cabarets, theatrical plays and has worked as a vocal teacher at the Norwegian National Academy of Theatre. For the 2003 album Ildfluer she won a Gammleng Award.

== Discography ==
- 1969: Dobbeltportrett (Nor-Disc), with Lars Klevstrand
- 1972: Olje, Brød Og Vin (Polydor)
- 1974: ... Vide Med Vind (Polydor), songs by Hartvig Kiran
- 1975: Roser Og Tistler (Polydor)
- 1978: Aramsasa (Flower)
- 1980: Yada (Triola), with Lakis Karnezis
- 1983: Hartvig Kirans Viser – Historia Om Ola Skutvik & Mariann – Del I og II (Art-O), with Lars Klevstrand and Ålesund Kammerensemble
- 1983: Epitafios (På Norsk)
- 1988: Under Sol Som Brenn Og Brenn (Heilo/Sidespor)
- 2003: Ildfluer (Pan)
- 2017: Annen Hvert Sekund ... Kvinneskjebner (Grappa)
