= St. Hallvard (periodical) =

Norwegian magazine

St. Hallvard is a quarterly Norwegian language periodical issued by Selskabet for Oslo Byes Vel. It was established in 1915, with Edvard Bull and Anton Wilhelm Brøgger as editors in chief. The current editor is Jan Sigurd Østberg. The name is derived from the saint Hallvard Vebjørnsson.
