= Kari Svendsen =

Norwegian singer, banjo player, and revue artist

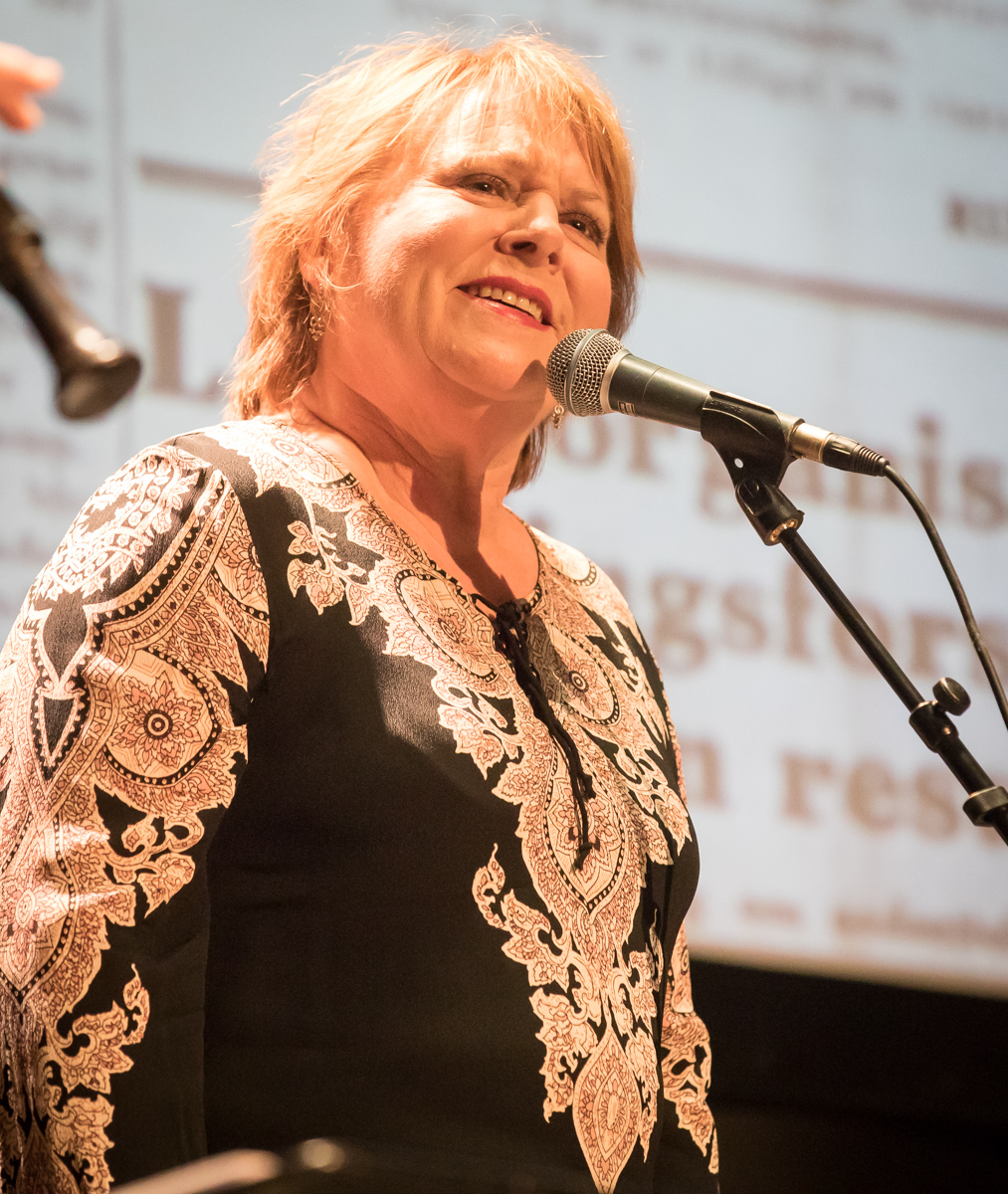
- Svendsen at the stage in 2016
- Born: 5 September 1950 (age 74); Oslo, Norway
- Occupation(s): Singer, banjo player, revue artist
- Spouse: Lillebjørn Nilsen
- Awards: Medal of St. Hallvard (2011)

Kari Svendsen (born 5 September 1950) is a Norwegian singer, banjo player and revue artist. She was born in Oslo, and has been married to singer-songwriter Lillebjørn Nilsen.

She was a co-founder and member of the band Christiania Fusel & Blaagress from 1968. Among her later albums are Kari Svendsen from 1978, Solskinn og sang from 1982, and Kari går til filmen from 1991.

She received the Medal of St. Hallvard in 2011.
