= Lillebjørn Nilsen =

Norwegian singer-songwriter (1950–2024)

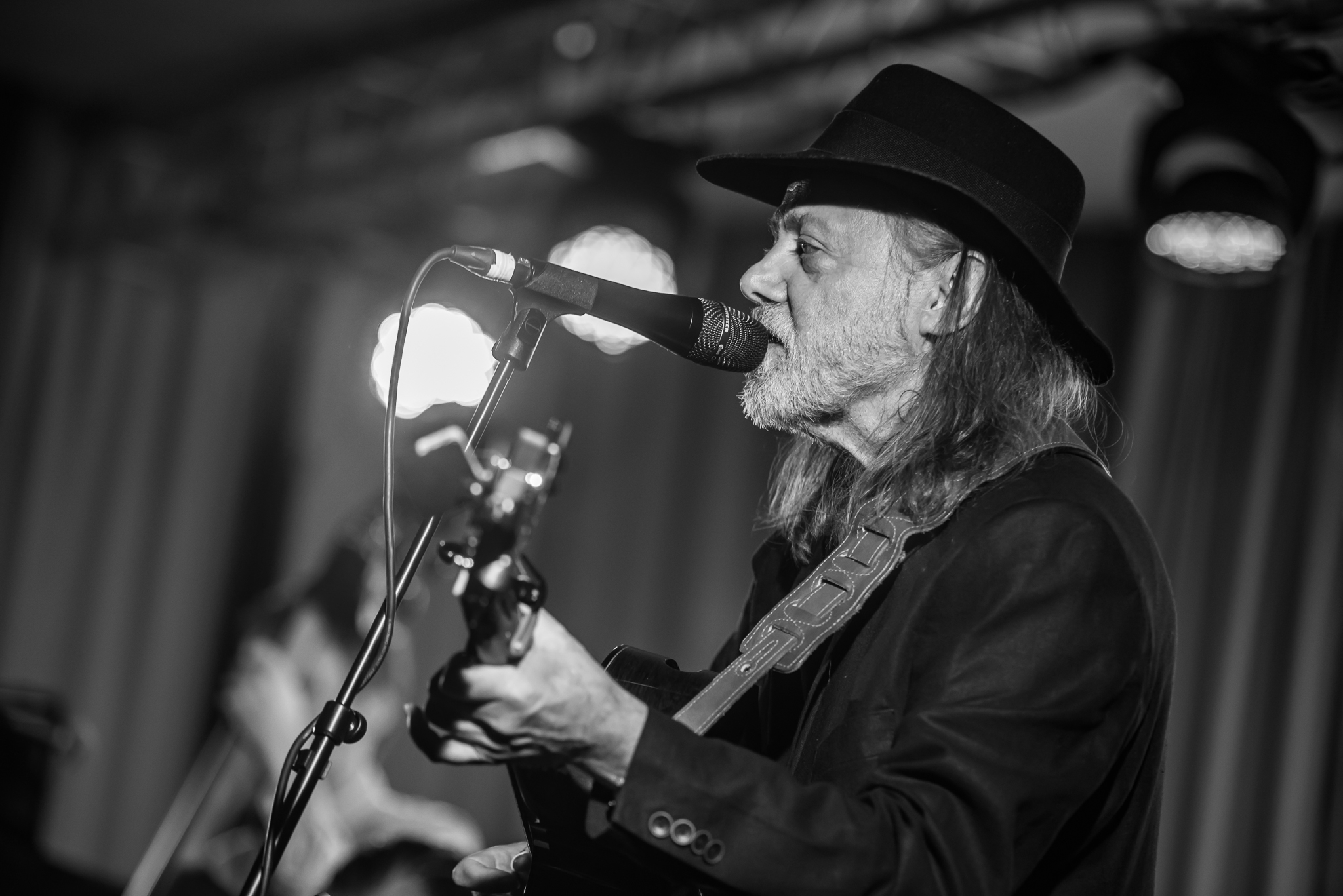
- Nilsen in 2015

Background information
- Born: Bjørn Falk Nilsen; 21 December 1950; Oslo, Norway
- Died: 27 January 2024 (aged 73) Oslo, Norway
- Genres: Folk; pop
- Occupations: Musician; songwriter
- Instruments: Vocals; guitar; Hardingfele
- Formerly of: Gitarkameratene
- Website: Official website

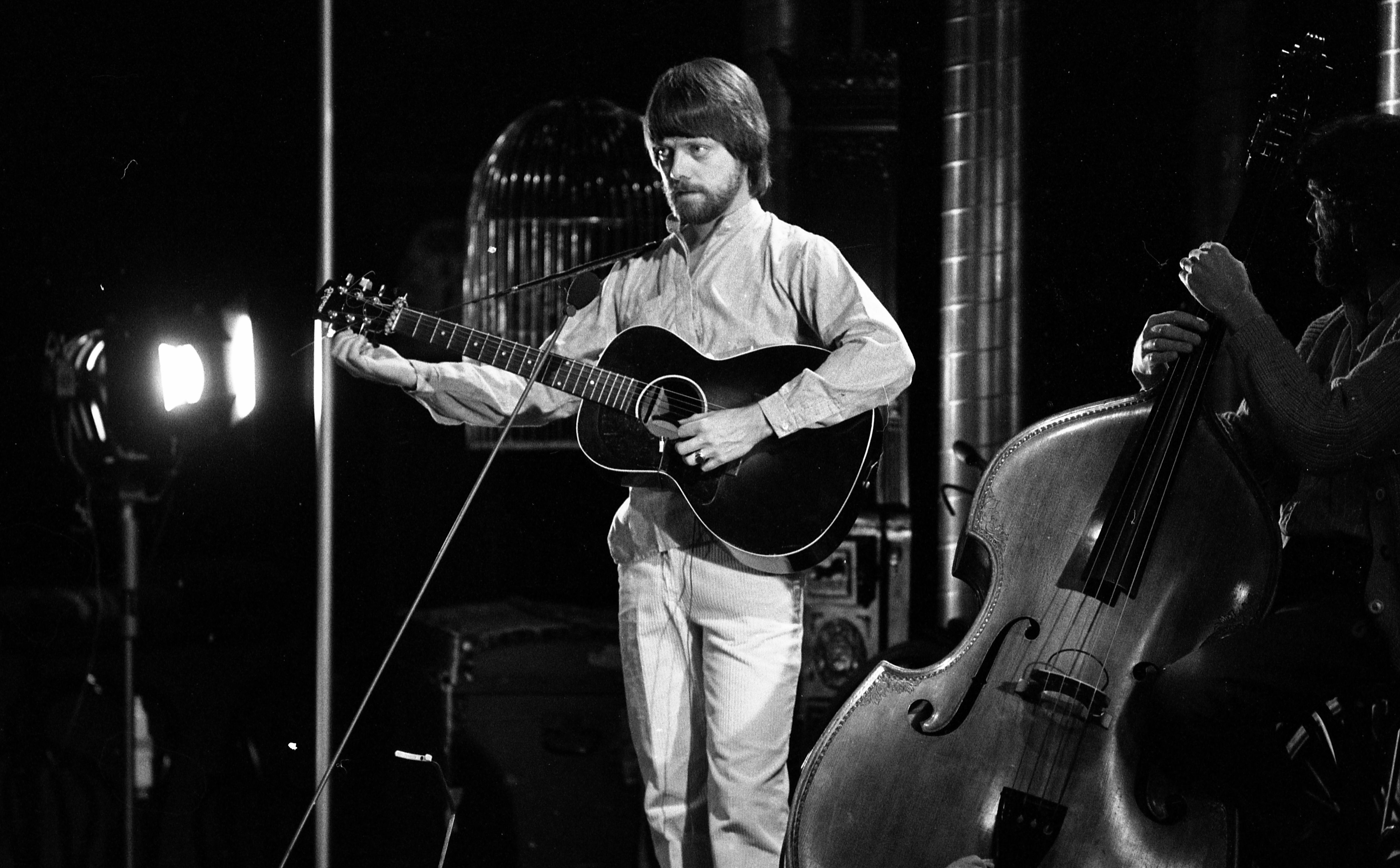
Nilsen in 1982

Lillebjørn Falk Nilsen (born Bjørn Falk Nilsen; 21 December 1950 – 27 January 2024) was a Norwegian singer-songwriter and folk musician. He was considered by many to be a leading "voice of Oslo", alongside Ole Paus, thanks to numerous classic songs about the city from the 1970s and onwards.

== Life and career ==
Bjørn Nilsen was born in Oslo and became known as "Lillebjørn" in the late 1960s when he and his namesake Bjørn Morisse performed as the folk duo The Young Norwegians. Because Morisse was the taller of the duo, he was nicknamed "Storebjørn" (Big Bjørn) while Nilsen was "Lillebjørn" (Little Bjørn), a stage name he kept throughout his career.

Nilsen was also a member of the Norwegian supergroup Gitarkameratene with Jan Eggum, Halvdan Sivertsen and Øystein Sunde.

In 1987 he received the Fritt Ord Honorary Award.

Nilsen collaborated with his friend and idol Pete Seeger on numerous occasions. He adapted Pete Seeger's song My Rainbow Race into Norwegian as Barn av regnbuen ("Children of the Rainbow").

Nilsen died in Oslo on 27 January 2024, at the age of 73.

== Discography ==
=== Albums ===
with The Young Norwegians

- 1967: Things on Our Mind
- 1969: Music

with Ballade!

- 1978: Ballade! På turné
- 1980: Ballade! Ekstranummer
- 2005: Ballade!s samlede (compilation)

with Gitarkameratene
Album

- 1989: Gitarkameratene
- 1990: Typisk norsk
- 2010: Kanon

Singles

- 1990: "Barn av regnbuen"

with Andy Irvine

- 2010: Abocurragh [Nilsen plays on one track.]
- 2021: Live in Telemark

Soloalbums

- 1971: Tilbake
- 1973: Portrett
- 1974: På stengrunn (with Jon Arne Corell, Kari Svendsen, Lars Klevstrand, Steinar Ofsdal & Carl Morten Iversen)
- 1974: Haba Haba
- 1975: Byen med det store hjertet
- 1976: Hei fara! Norske folkeviser
- 1978: Lillebjørn Nilsens beste
- 1979: Oslo 3
- 1980: Live at Sioux Falls (USA)
- 1980: Ballade! Ekstranummer
- 1982: Original Nilsen
- 1984: Lillebjørn Nilsens utvalgte
- 1985: Hilsen Nilsen
- 1986: Tekst og musikk: Lillebjørn Nilsen
- 1988: Sanger
- 1989: SuperStars
- 1993: Nære Nilsen
- 1996: 40 spor: Nilsens 40 beste
- 2010: Stilleste gutt på sovesal 1
- 2012: Postkort fra Lillebjørn

Re-released albums

- 1995: Haba Haba
- 2001: Portrett
- 2003: Byen med det store hjertet (Re-release)
- 2003: Tilbake (Re-release)
- 2003: Portrett (Re-release)

Compilation albums

- 1978: Lillebjørn Nilsens beste
- 1984: Lillebjørn Nilsens utvalgte
- 1986: Tekst og musikk: Lillebjørn Nilsen
- 1996: 40 spor: Nilsens 40 beste
- 2010: Stilleste gutt på sovesal 1 (10 CDs and a DVD)

With The Young Norwegians
Album

- 1967: Things On Our Mind
- 1968* Music

Singles

- 1966: "Plenty Nothingness and Love" / "Det står ein friar uti garde"
- 1966: "Joys of Love" / "Jug of Punch"
- 1967: "Vuggevise for André" / "Goodbye to Your Sparkling Blue Eyes"
- 1968: "Nightingale" / "Grannie" with Kari Svendsen

Solo

- 1973: "Barn av regnbuen" / "Alle duene"
- 1974: "Haba Haba" / "Kirsebærtreet"
- 1975: "Byen med det store hjertet" / "Brevet"
- 1979: "Bysommer" / "Stilleste gutt på sovesal 1"
- 1982: "Tanta til Beate" / "Se alltid lyst på livet"
- 1985: "Blå odyssé" / "Sangen om Danmark"
- 1988: "Se deg aldri tilbake" / "Den dypeste hemmelighet"
- 1993: "Fort gjort å glemme" / "Så nære vi var"
- 1993: "1000 søte damer"
- 2006: "Oleanna" (with Pete Seeger) (live)
- 2012: "Feriebrev" (with Finn Kalvik & Øystein Sunde)
