= Arve Tellefsen =

Norwegian violinist (born 1936)

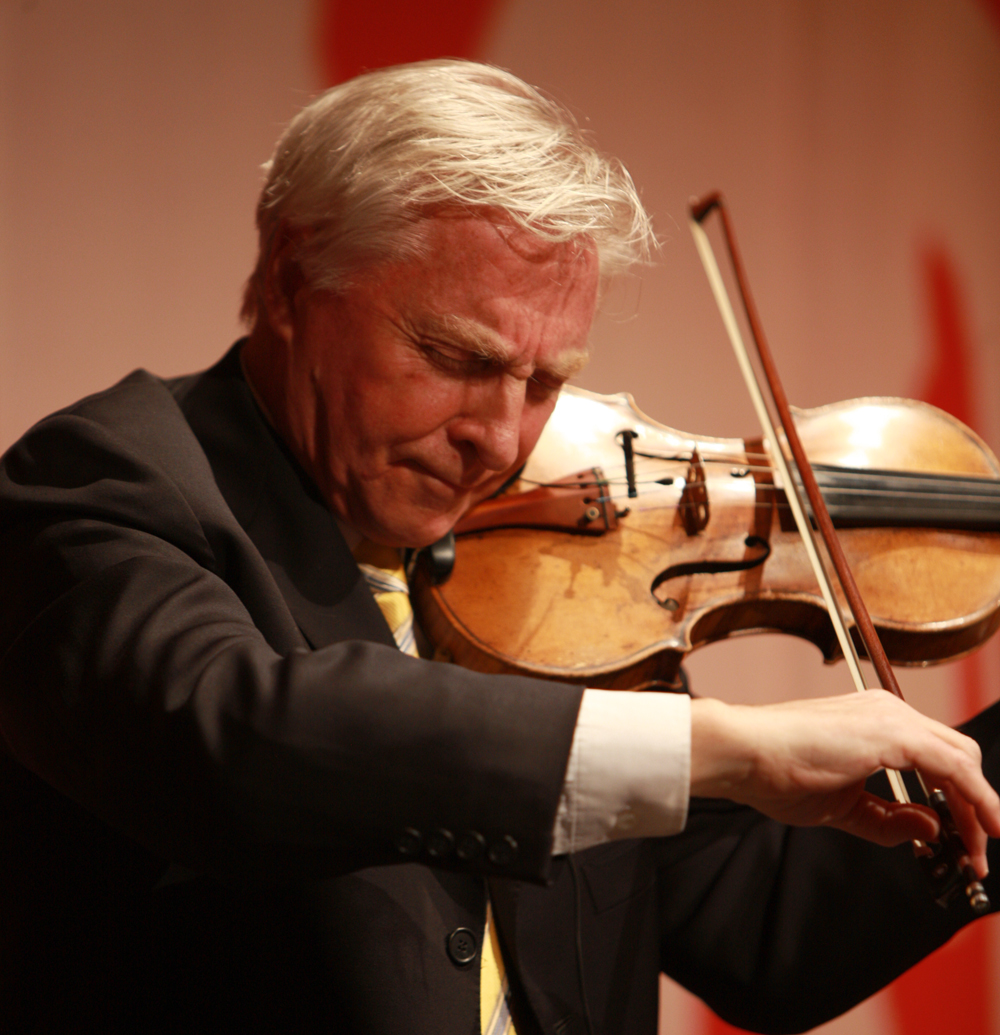
- Arve Tellefsen at the Norwegian Labour Party, April 2009

Background information
- Born: 14 December 1936 (age 89); Trondheim, Sør-Trøndelag, Norway
- Genres: Classical
- Instrument: Violin
- Labels: Virgin; Grappa; Simax
- Website: en.arvetellefsen.no/bio

Arve Tellefsen (Norwegian pronunciation: [ˈɑ̂ɾʋə ˈtɛ̂lːəfsn̩]) (born 14 December 1936) is a Norwegian violinist who has worked with conductors such as Mariss Jansons, Arvid Jansons, Herbert Blomstedt, Gary Bertini, Evgeny Svetlanov, Bryden Thomson, Neeme Järvi, Esa-Pekka Salonen, Paavo Berglund, Vladimir Ashkenazy, Walter Weller and Zubin Mehta. In the UK, he has appeared with the Royal Philharmonic, the London Philharmonic, The Hallé, BBC Scottish Symphony Orchestra, BBC Welsh Orchestra, the Liverpool Philharmonic and the Royal Scottish National Orchestra.

== Career ==
When he was six years old, Tellefsen began playing the violin in 'Trondheims musikkskole' (the music school in Trondheim). In 1955, he began his studies at The Royal Danish Academy of Music in Copenhagen. In 1959, he had his debut in Universitetets Aula, Oslo.

Tellefsen has won the Harriet Cohen International Music Award.

Tellefsen founded the Oslo Chamber Music Festival, which takes place annually and attracts the cream of international artists, including Anne Sofie von Otter, Randi Stene, Solveig Kringlebotn, Elizabeth Norberg-Schulz, Barbara Hendricks, Liv Ullmann, Jan Garbarek, Leif Ove Andsnes, Truls Mørk, Yuri Bashmet, Mischa Maisky, Gidon Kremer, Angela Hewitt, Hagen Quartet, Hilliard Ensemble, Jordi Savall, Rolf Lislevand and Maria João Pires. He has also recently recorded Edvard Grieg: Complete Violin Sonatas with pianist Håvard Gimse at Grieg's home, Troldhaugen. His latest recording is music by the famous Norwegian violinist and composer Ole Bull (1810–1880)

== 1984 aircraft emergency ==
In February 1984 he participated in an emergency evacuation on an SAS flight that ended up in the water off of JFK airport. Although instructed to leave their possessions, he refused to abandon his priceless Guarneri violin as they evacuated onto an inflatable raft. The evacuees had to paddle away from the airliner with their bare hands, and due to the lack of oars there arose several suggestions (though mostly in jest) to use the instrument as a replacement thereof.

== Prizes and honours ==
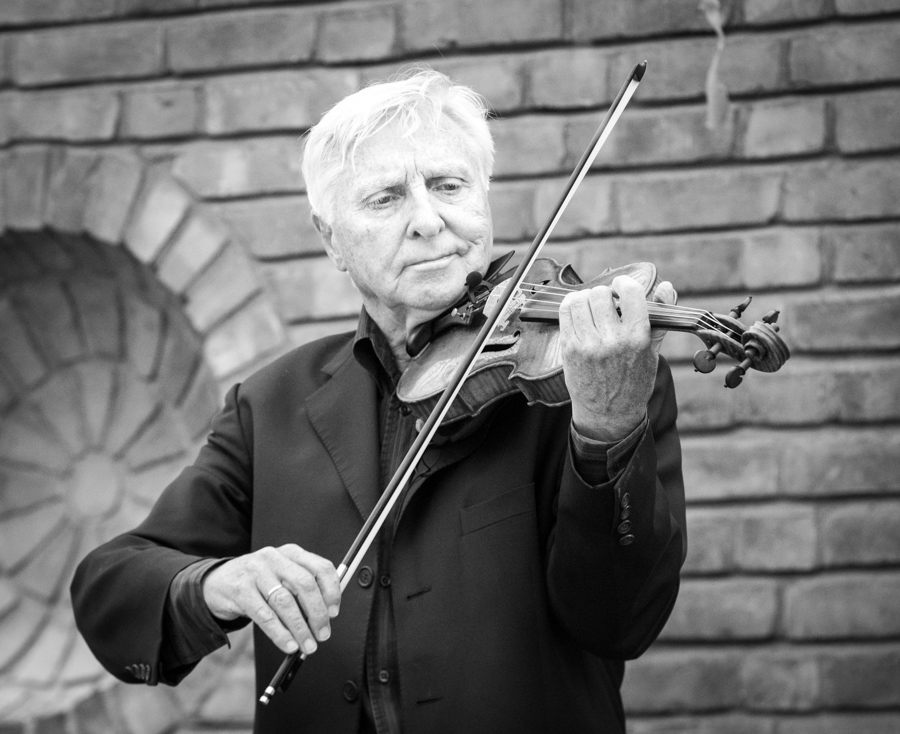
Arve Tellefsen performing in 2017

- 1956: Knight of Polyhymnia, the order of the Symphony Orchestra at Studentersamfundet i Trondhjem.
- 1956: «Princess Astrid Musical Award»
- 1962: Harriet Cohen International Music Award, London
- 1968/1969: Musikk-kritikerprisen
- 1973: «Griegprisen»
- 1975: Festspill-prisen Festspillene i Bergen
- 1977: «Sør-Trøndelag county Culture Award»
- 1977: Spellemannprisen in Open class, for the Sindings fiolinkonsert/du milde Mozart
- 1978: «This years 'Peer Gynt'»
- 1980: Spellemannprisen in the class Classical music / Contemporary music for Serenade
- 1983: Gammlengprisen 1983 in the class Classical music
- 1986: Spellemannprisen in the class Classical music / Contemporary music for the Grieg sonater for fiolin/klaver og cello/klaver together with Eva Knardahl (klaver), Aage Kvalbein (cello) og Jens Harald Bratlie (klaver)
- 1988: Spellemannprisen in Open class, for the album Pan
- 1988: Appointed member of the Royal Swedish Academy of Music
- 1994: Oslo City Culture Award
- 1994: Appointed «Commander of St. Olavs Orden»
- 1996: Norsk kulturråds ærespris
- 1996: Doctor Art Honoris Causa NTNU (Honorary Doctorate by the Norges Teknisk-Naturvitenskapelige Universitet in Trondheim)
- 1997: Honorary Citizen of Trondheim i 1997, a statue of Tellefsen was raised
- 2004: «Fartein Valen Award»
- 2004: «Ole Bull Award»
- 2005: Appointed «Commander with Star of St. Olavs Orden»
- 2007: «Anders Jahres Culture Award»
- 2009: Receiving an honorary degree at the Norwegian Academy of Music.

== Selected discography ==
=== Solo albums ===
- 1988: Pan (Norsk Plateproduksjon)
- 1992: Intermezzo (Grappa Music)
- 1995: Arco (Grappa Music)

=== As soloist ===
- 1964: Air Norvegen (Philips Records), with Robert Levin
- 1967: Fartein Valen: Violin Concerto op. 37, with Bergen Philharmonic Orchestra, conductor: Karsten Andersen
- 1973: Schostakowitsch: Violinkonzert Op. 77 (BASF), with the Schwedisches Radio-Sinfonie-Orchester, conductor: Gary Bertini
- 1974: Johan Svendsen: Fiolinkonsert, Op. 6 / Cellokonsert, Op. 7 (Norsk Kulturråds Klassikerserie), with Hege Waldeland (cello), Filharmonisk Selskaps Orkester, Musikselskabet «Harmonien»'s Orkester, conductor: Karsten Andersen
- 1977: Christian Sinding, Konsert For Fiolin Og Orkester Nr. 1, Op. 45 / Suite For Fiolin Og Orkester Op. 10 / Legende For Fiolin Og Orkester Op. 46 (Norsk Kulturråds Klassikerserie), with Filharmonisk Selskaps Orkester, conductors: Okko Kamu & Kjell Ingebretsen
- 1979: Johan Daniel Berlin: Fiolinkonsert – 2 Symfonier – 4 Menuetter (Norsk Kulturråds Klassikerserie), with Kjell Jønnum (trumpet) Gayle Mosand (harpsichord) & musicians from «Trondheim Kammerorkester», conductor: Arve Tellefsen
- 1980: Ole Bull: En Jubileumskonsert Med Kjente Og Ukjente Komposisjoner Inkl. «Sæterjentens Søndag» (Norsk Kulturråds Klassikerserie), with Musikkselskabet «Harmonien»'s Orkester, conductor: Karsten Andersen
- 1986: Edvard Grieg: Fiolinsonate Nr. 1 I F-Dur, Opus 8 / Fiolinsonate Nr. 2 I G-Dur, Opus 13 (Norsk Kulturråds Klassikerserie), with Eva Knardahl (klaver)
- 1986: Edvard Grieg: Fiolinsonate Nr. 3 I C-Moll, Opus 45 / Cellosonate I A-Moll, Opus 36 (Norsk Kulturråds Klassikerserie), with Eva Knardahl (Grand Piano), Aage Kvalbein (cello) & Jens Harald Bratlie (Grand Piano)
- 1989: Edvard Grieg: Violin Sonatas (Norsk Kulturråds Klassikerserie), with Eva Knardahl (piano)
- 1991: Schostakowitsch: Chamber Works (BIS)
- 1993: Schostakowitsch: Violin Concerto no. 1 op. 99 / Bach: Violin Concerto in E major (Grappa Music), with the Royal Philharmonic Orchestra, conductor: Paavo Berglund
- 1994: Carl Nielsen: Fiolinkonsert op. 33 (Virgin Classics), with the Royal Philharmonic Orchestra, conductor: Sir Yehudi Menuhin
- 1994: Ludwig van Beethoven: Fiolinkonsert op. 61, Max Bruch: Fiolinkonsert op. 26 (Grappa Music), with London Philharmonic Orchestra, conductor: Vernon Handley
- 1995: Jean Sibelius: Violin Concerto in D minor, Op. 47 (Simax Classics), with the Royal Philharmonic Orchestra, conductor: Paavo Berglund
- 1997: Stille Natt (Sony Classical), with Nidarosdomens Guttekor, conductor: Bjørn Moe
- 1997: Arne Nordheim: Violin Concerto (Sony Classical), Oslo Filharmoniske Orkester, conductor: Christian Eggen
- 1999: Nielsen: Violin Concerto; Symphony No 4 (Simax Classics), with Royal Philharmonic Orchestra, conductor: Sir Yehudi Menuhin
- 1999: Edvard Grieg: Samlede Fiolinsonater (Sony Classical), with Håvard Gimse (klaver)
- 2006: Aria (Simax Classics), with Nidarosdomens Guttekor
- 2008: Nielsen: Symphony No. 5 – Concertos – Wind Quintet, with the Danish Radio Symphony Orchestra, conductor: Rafael Kubelík
- 2010: Ole Bull: Arve Tellefsen Plays Ole Bull (Simax Classics), with the Trondheim Symphony Orchestra, conductor: Eivind Aadland

=== Collaborative works ===
- 1977: Du Milde Mosart! (NorDisc), with Knutsen & Ludvigsen and «Bakklandet Bassangforening»

=== Compilations ===
- 1992: Musikken Inni Oss / Nattønsker (Sonet Records), with Sigmund Groven
- 2001: Nielsen / Vaughan Williams: Symphonies & Concertos (Virgin Classics), with Markham, Broadway & the Royal Philharmonic Orchestra, conductor: Yehudi Menuhin

Awards
Preceded by Ole Henrik Moe	Recipient of the Norsk kulturråds ærespris 1996	Succeeded by Liv Ullmann
Preceded by Tommy Tee	Recipient of the Spellemannprisen honorary award 2016	Succeeded by Mari Boine
