= Nidaros Cathedral =

Cathedral in Trøndelag, Norway

Nidarosdomen
- Nidaros Cathedral
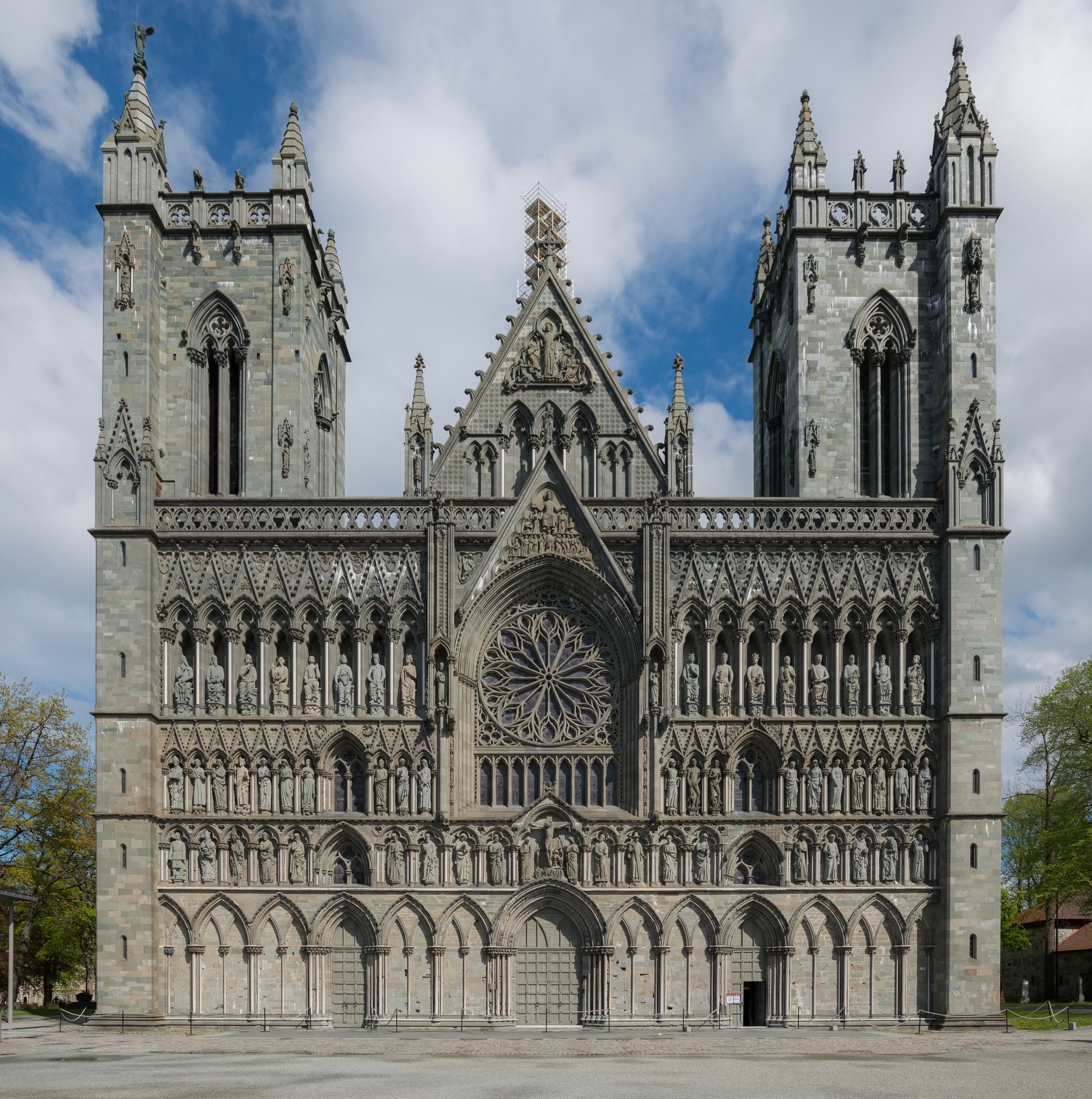
- The church's west front, restored 1905–1983
- Nidarosdomen
- 63.4267°N 10.3962°E
- Location: Trondheim, Trøndelag
- Country: Norway
- Denomination: Church of Norway
- Previous denomination: Roman Catholic
- Churchmanship: Evangelical Lutheran
- Website: nidarosdomen.no

History
- Status: Cathedral
- Founded: c. 1070
- Dedication: Holy Trinity
- Consecrated: 1300

Architecture
- Functional status: Active
- Architect(s): Heinrich Ernst Schirmer and Christian Christie
- Architectural type: Long church
- Style: Romanesque and Gothic
- Completed: 1300 (726 years ago)

Specifications
- Capacity: 1850
- Materials: Soapstone

Administration
- Diocese: Nidaros bispedømme
- Deanery: Nidaros domprosti
- Parish: Nidaros og Vår Frue
- Norwegian Cultural Heritage Site
- Type: Church
- Status: Automatically protected
- ID: 85130

Nidaros Cathedral (Norwegian: Nidarosdomen / Nidaros domkirke) is a Church of Norway cathedral located in the city of Trondheim in Trøndelag county. It is built over the burial site of King Olav II (c. 995–1030, reigned 1015–1028), who brought Christianity to Norway and became the patron saint of the nation; the consecration of new Norwegian monarchs occurs at Nidaros Cathedral. It was built over a 230-year period, from 1070 to 1300 when it was substantially completed. However additional work, additions and renovations have continued intermittently since then, including a major reconstruction starting in 1869 and completed in 2001. Nidaros Cathedral is a popular place of Evangelical-Lutheran Christian pilgrimage, with several thousand pilgrims visiting it each year. Mass and the Divine Office, according to the Evangelical-Lutheran tradition, are celebrated daily at Nidaros Cathedral, in addition to other prayer services that are held there throughout the day.

In 1152, the church was designated as the cathedral for the Roman Catholic Archdiocese of Nidaros. In 1537, during the Protestant Reformation, it became part of the newly established state Church of Norway (Evangelical-Lutheran). It is the northernmost medieval cathedral in the world.

The cathedral is the main church for the Nidaros og Vår Frue parish, the seat of the Nidaros domprosti (arch-deanery), and the seat of the Bishop of the Diocese of Nidaros. The Preses of the Church of Norway is also based at this cathedral. The church seats about 1,850 people.

== History ==
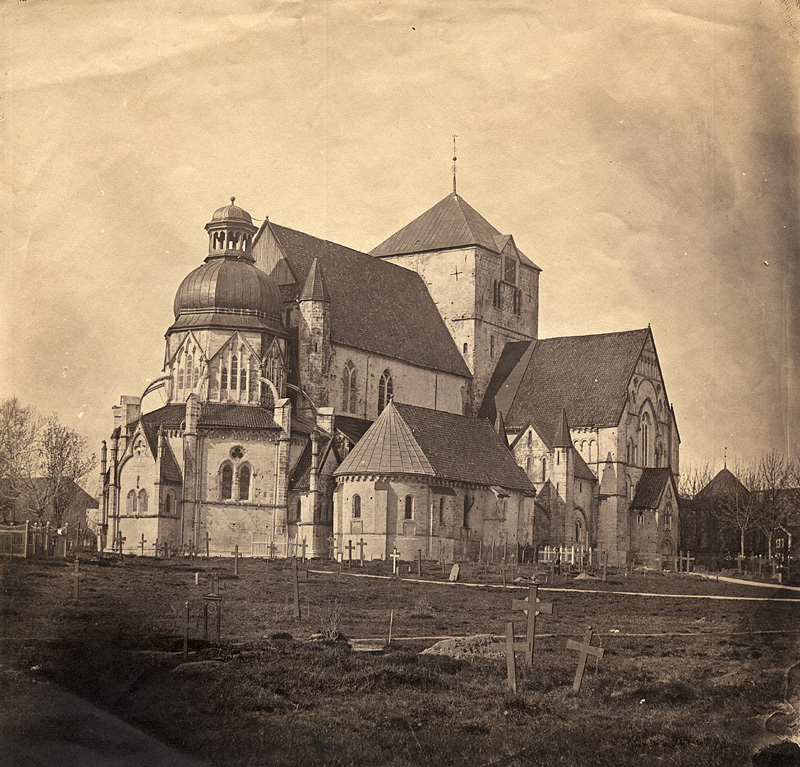
The Cathedral in 1857

Nidaros Cathedral was built beginning in 1070 to memorialize the burial place of Olav II of Norway, the king who was killed in 1030 in the Battle of Stiklestad. He was canonized as Saint Olav a year later by Grimketel, the Bishop of Nidaros (the canonization was later confirmed by the pope (Note: Grimketel initiated the beatification of Olaf on 3 August 1031. This was before the time of the formal canonization process now in use)). Around 1070, King Olav Kyrre, who was St. Olav's nephew, began building a large stone church on the site where the wooden church had stood. It was dedicated to the Holy Trinity but was commonly called Kristkirken (an earlier term for cathedral). The altar in this church was to be placed over the grave, and when the church was completed around 1090, St. Olav's shrine was moved here and placed over the altar. In this church, almost all Norwegian royals of the 11th and 12th centuries were buried. Kristkirken was about 50 meters long with a choir, nave, and west tower, and it was the largest church in Norway at the time.

Nothing of Olav Kyrre's church is visible today. It was gradually replaced by new building parts in the 13th century, but its outline can be seen in the ground plan: as was often the case in the Middle Ages, the later walls were built on the old foundations to save time and costs. During the restoration in the late 19th century, these foundations were excavated and measured, providing some knowledge of the church's architecture.

It was designated the cathedral of the Catholic Archdiocese of Nidaros from its establishment in 1152 until its abolition in 1537 under the Reformation.

Since the Reformation, it has served as the cathedral of the Lutheran bishops of Trondheim (or Nidaros) in the Diocese of Nidaros. The architectural style of the cathedral is Romanesque and Gothic. Historically it has been an important destination for pilgrims coming from all of Northern Europe.

In 1814, this church served as an election church (Norwegian: valgkirke). Together with more than 300 other parish churches across Norway, it was a polling station for elections to the 1814 Norwegian Constituent Assembly which wrote the Constitution of Norway. This was Norway's first national elections. Each church parish was a constituency that elected people called "electors" who later met together in each county to elect the representatives for the assembly that was to meet in Eidsvoll later that year.

Along with Vår Frue Church, the cathedral is part of the Nidaros og Vår Frue parish in the Nidaros deanery in the Diocese of Nidaros.

== Building and restoration ==
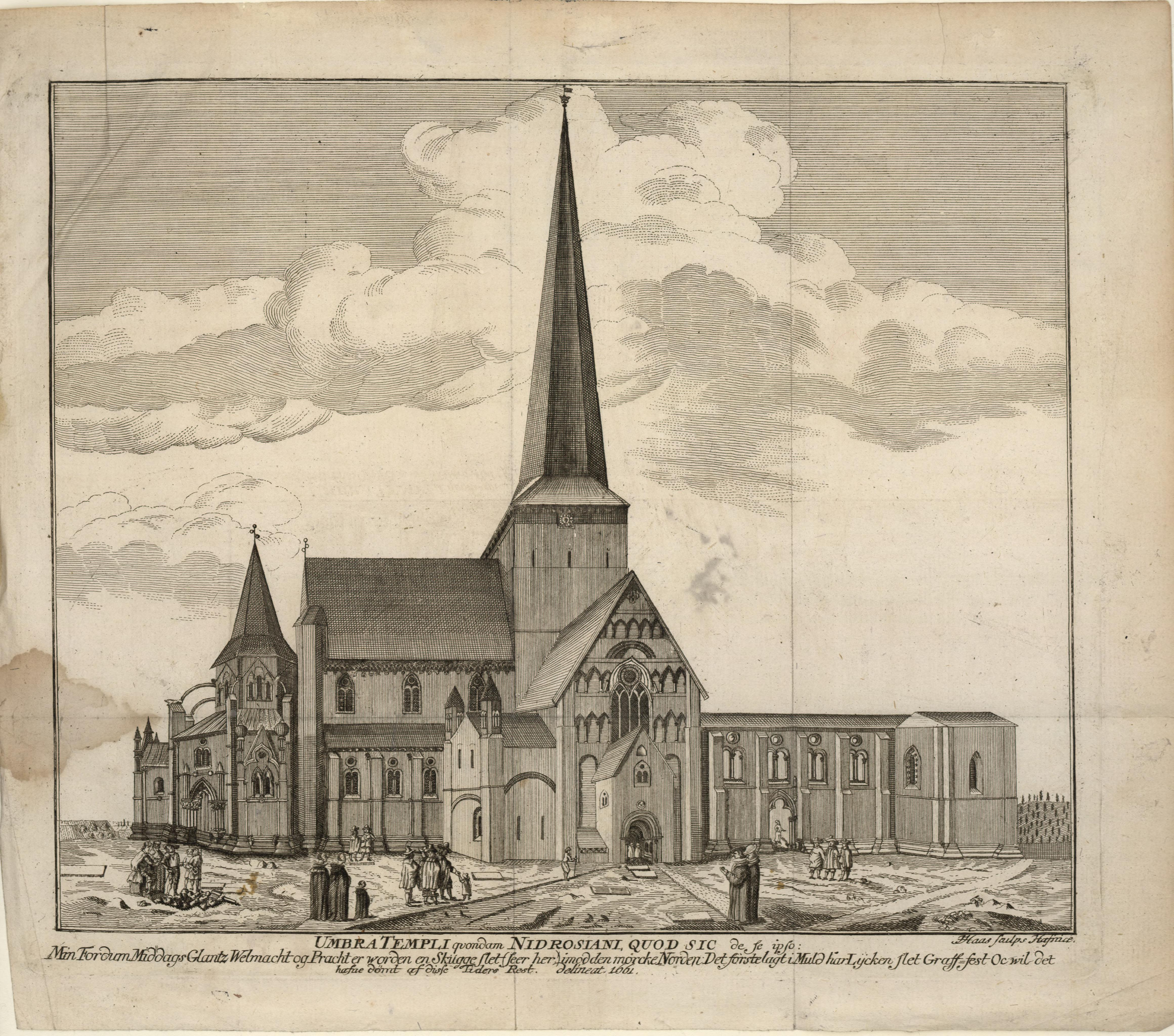
The church before 1762

Work on the cathedral as a memorial to St. Olav started in 1070. It was finished some time around 1300, nearly 150 years after being established as the cathedral of the diocese. The cathedral was badly damaged by fires in 1327 and again in 1531. The nave was destroyed and was not rebuilt until the restoration in early 1900s.

In 1708, the church burned down completely except for the stone walls. It was struck by lightning in 1719, and was again ravaged by fire. Major rebuilding and restoration of the cathedral started in 1869, initially led by architect Heinrich Ernst Schirmer, and nearly completed by Christian Christie. It was officially completed in 2001. Maintenance of the cathedral is an ongoing process.

The oldest parts of the cathedral consist of the octagon with its surrounding ambulatory. This was the site of the original high altar, with the reliquary casket of Saint Olav, and choir. Design of the octagon may have been inspired by the Corona of Canterbury Cathedral, although octagonal shrines have a long history in Christian architecture. Similarly, the choir shows English influence, and appears to have been modeled after the Angel Choir of Lincoln Cathedral.

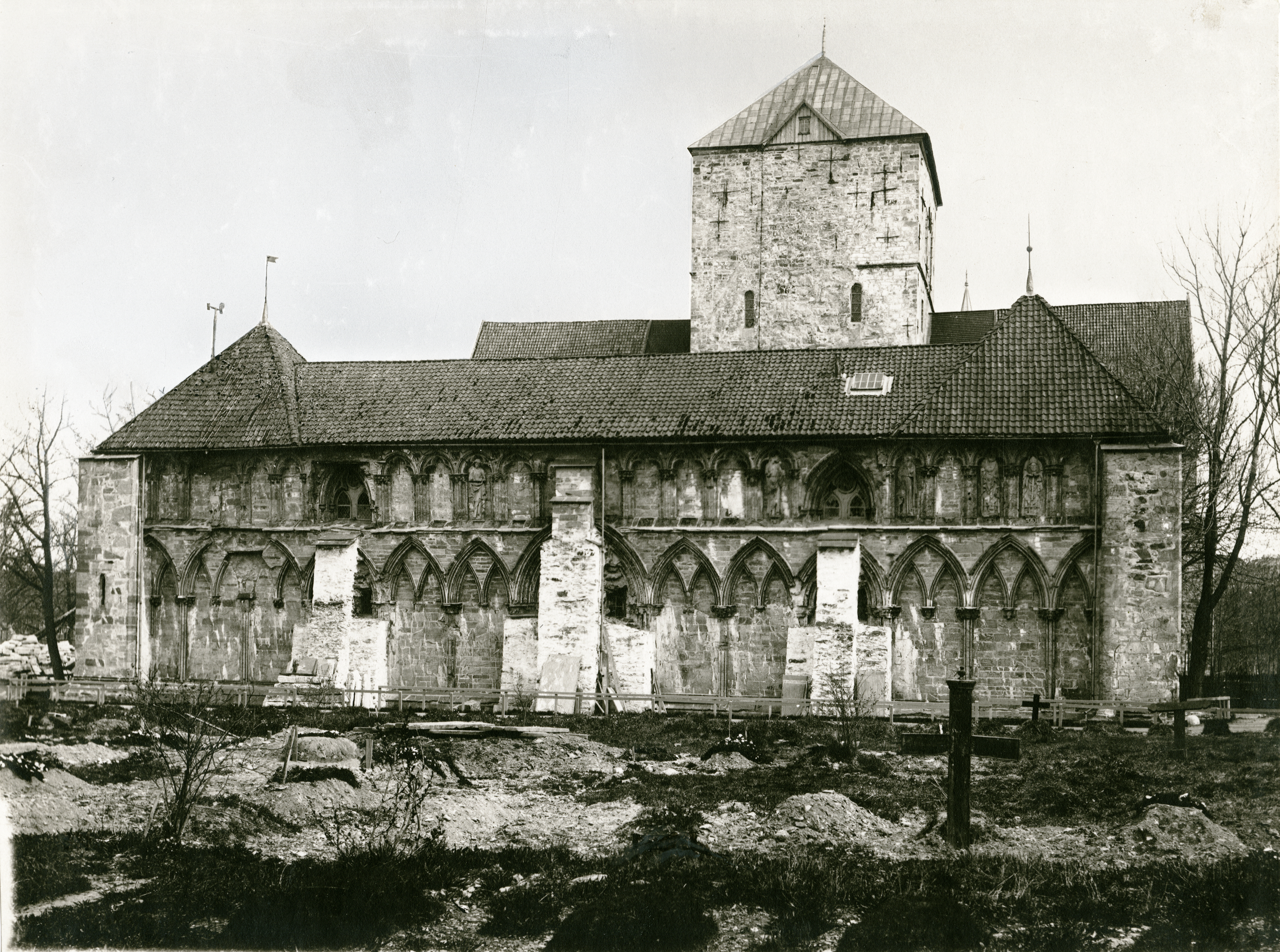
The west front in the late 19th century, before restoration

It is joined to the octagon by a stone screen that fills the entire east side of the choir. The principal arch of this screen is subdivided into three subsidiary arches: the central arch frames a statue of Christ the Teacher, standing on the top of a central arch of three subsidiary arches below him. The space above the principal arch, corresponding to the vault of the choir, contains a crucifix by the Norwegian sculptor Gustav Vigeland, placed between statues of the Virgin Mary and the Apostle John. Built into the south side of the ambulatory is a small well. A bucket could be lowered to draw up water drawn from the spring that originated from St. Olav's original burial place. (This was covered over by the construction of later cathedrals).

The present cathedral has two principal altars. At the east end of the chancel in the octagon is an altar at the site of the medieval high altar, behind which stood the silver reliquary casket containing the remains of St. Olav. This silver-gilt reliquary casket was melted down for coinage by Christian II and St. Olav's remains buried in an unknown location under the cathedral. The only relic known to have survived is a femur in a silver-gilt reliquary. Shaped as a forearm, it was given by Queen Josephine to St. Olav Catholic Cathedral in Oslo. The original reliquary casket was in the form of a church, with dragon heads on its gables. The dragons are similar to those carved on the gables of Norwegian stave churches. Surviving medieval reliquary caskets in Norway frequently also bear such dragon heads, for instance, that at Heddal Stave Church. He was the church's and the kingdom's patron saint. The current altar was designed to recall in marble sculpture the essential form of this reliquary casket. It replaces the previous baroque altar, which was transferred to Vår Frue Church.

The second altar is in the crossing, where the transept intersects the nave and the chancel. It bears a large modern silver crucifix. It was commissioned and paid for by Norwegian American emigrants in the early twentieth century, and the design was inspired by the memory of a similar silver crucifix in the medieval church. The medieval chapter house may also be used as a chapel for smaller groups of worshipers.

All the stained glass in the cathedral dates from its rebuilding in the 19th and 20th centuries. The windows on the north side of the church depict scenes from the Old Testament against a blue background, while those on the south side of the church depict scenes from the New Testament against a red background.

== Organs ==
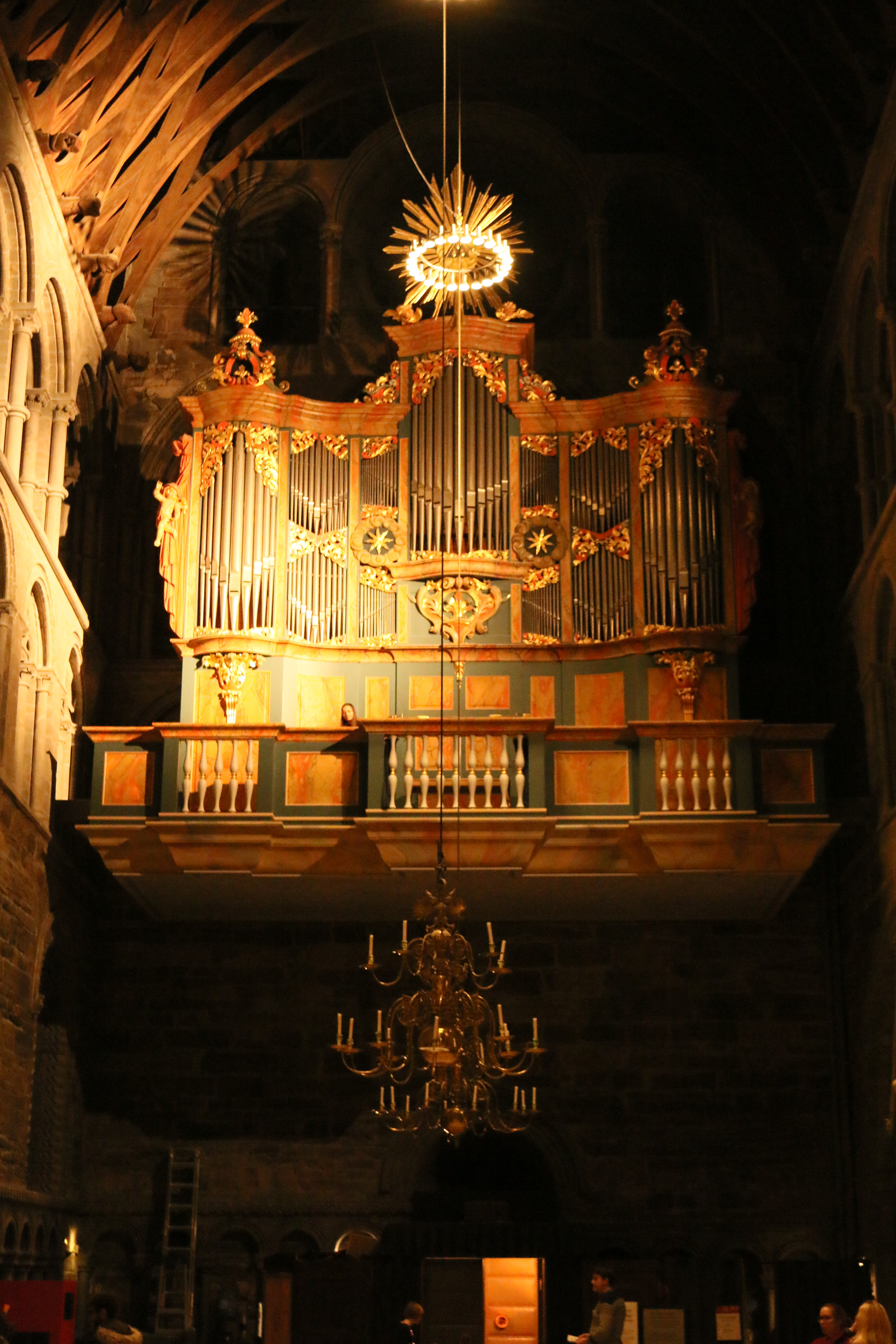
Nidaros Cathedral Wagner organ

Two organs are installed in the cathedral. The main organ was built by the Steinmeyer firm in 1930, and was erected in the north transept. It then had 125 stops. Installation of the Steinmeyer organ was commissioned in 1930 for the 900th anniversary of the Battle of Stiklestad. The organ was funded mostly by donations, particularly by Elias Anton Cappelen Smith. In 1962, the organ was heavily rebuilt and moved to the west nave. Many stops were removed; some of them were used to build a new choir organ. This organ was fully restored in 2014.

The old Baroque organ built by noted German organ builder Joachim Wagner (1690–1749) during the period 1738–40 was carefully restored by Jürgen Ahrend between 1993 and 1994. It has 30 stops and is located at a gallery in the north transept.

== Place of Christian pilgrimage ==
Today, the cathedral is a popular place of Evangelical-Lutheran Christian pilgrimage. Saint Olaf had brought Christianity to Norway, with the people of the country converting to the faith. After his death in the Battle of Stiklestad, he was recognized as a Christian martyr and subsequently canonized as a saint in the Western Christian Church. According to Christian tradition, miracles occurred at his tomb in Trondheim. A church, which eventually became the grand Nidaros Cathedral, was built over his grave.

Pilgrims reach Nidaros Cathedral by travelling the historic Pilgrim's Route (Norwegian: Pilegrimsleden) as an act of sacrifice offered to God, as well as to pay homage to Saint Olaf. Upon arrival to Nidaros Cathedral, Christian pilgrims traditionally walk around it thrice, and then enter it reverently, with a prayerful state of mind. Mass and the Divine Office, according to the Evangelical-Lutheran tradition, are celebrated daily at Nidaros Cathedral, in addition to other prayer services that are held there throughout the day. Christian pilgrims complete their pilgrimage to Nidaros Cathedral by attending Mass there and receiving the Eucharist. Those who complete their pilgrimage receive a pilgrim certificate that is granted by Nidaros Cathedral.

Nidaros Cathedral is also the site of the observation of Olav's Wake (Norwegian: Olavsvaka). This Christian religious and cultural festival is centered upon the anniversary of the death of Saint Olav at the Battle of Stiklestad. A number of pilgrims come to Nidaros Cathedral for this.

== Media gallery ==
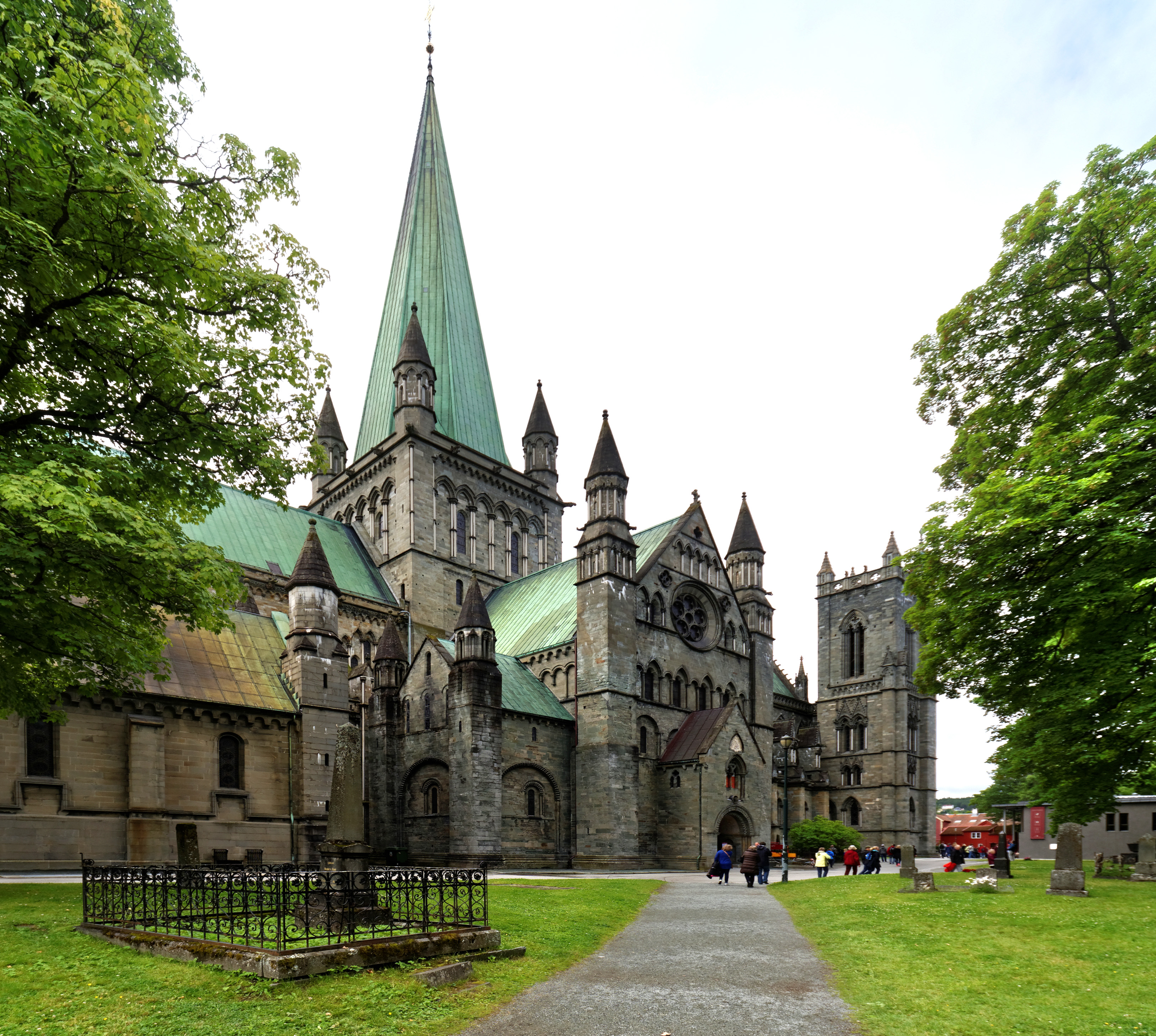
From north-east

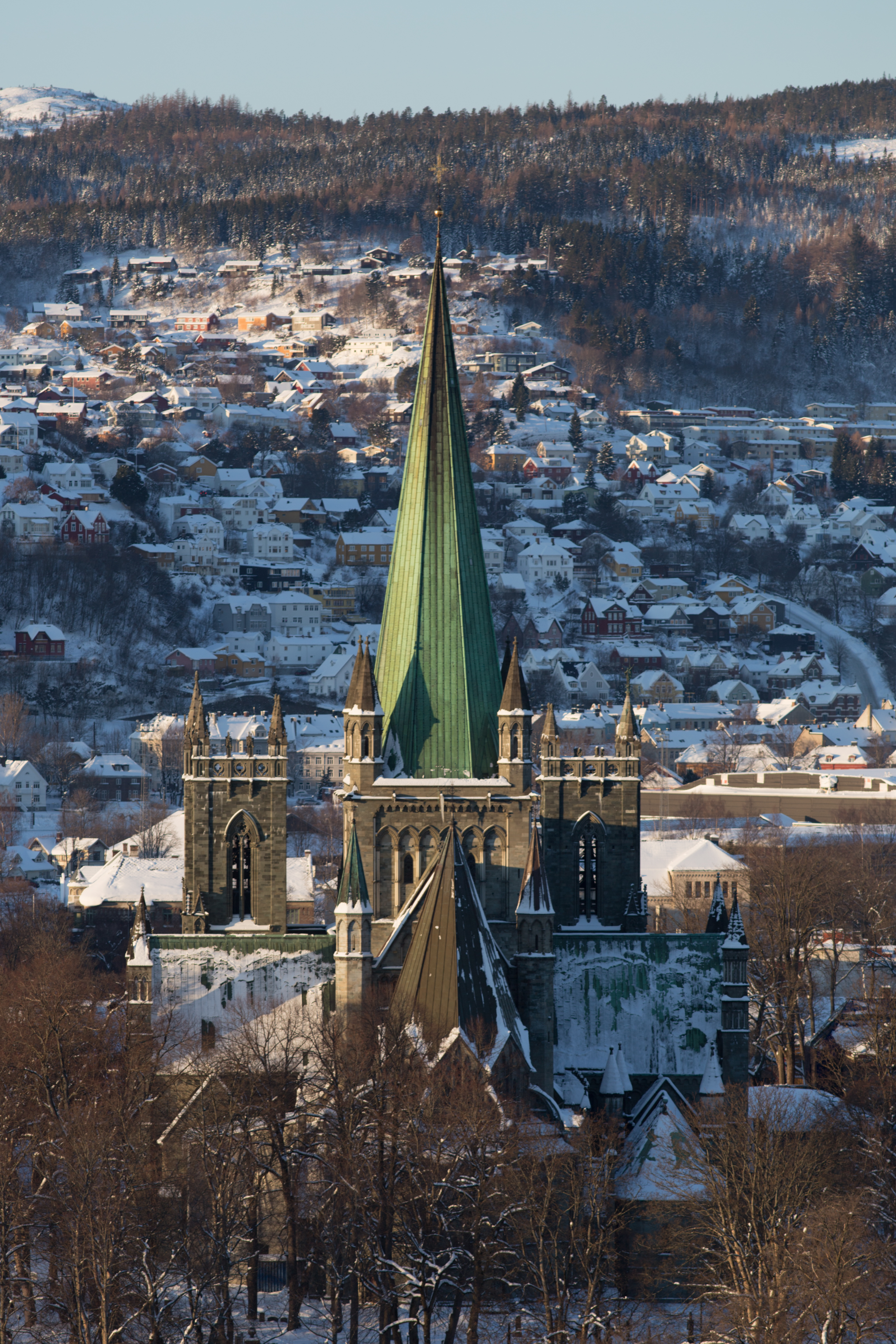
From east

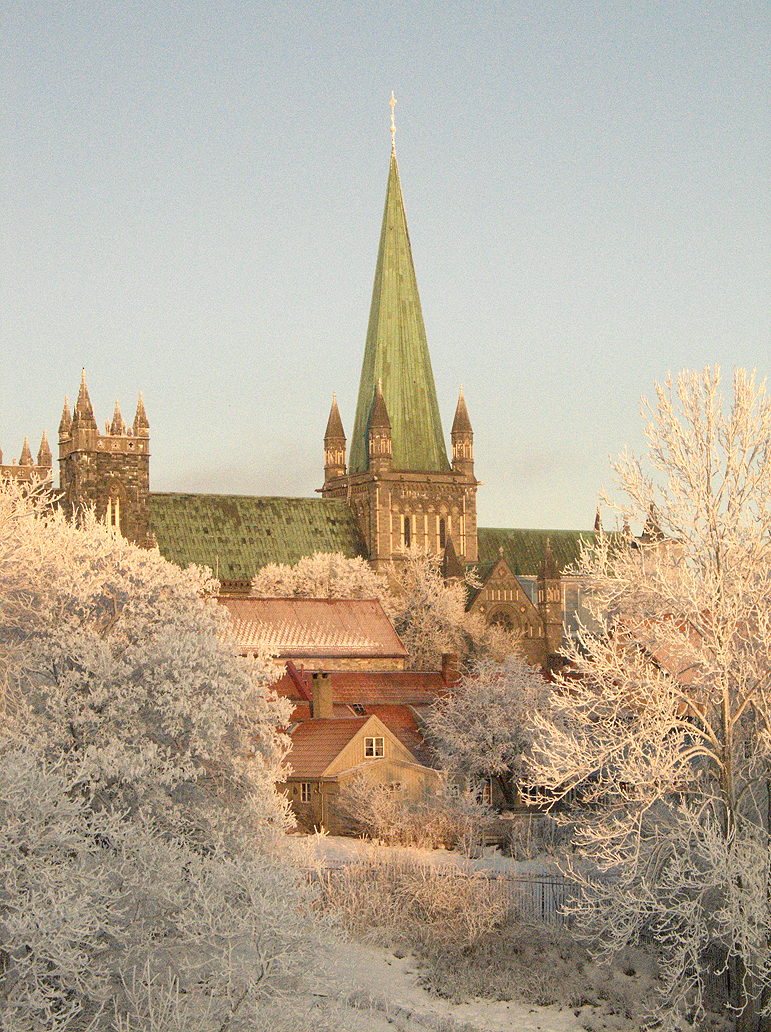
From Elgeseter bridge

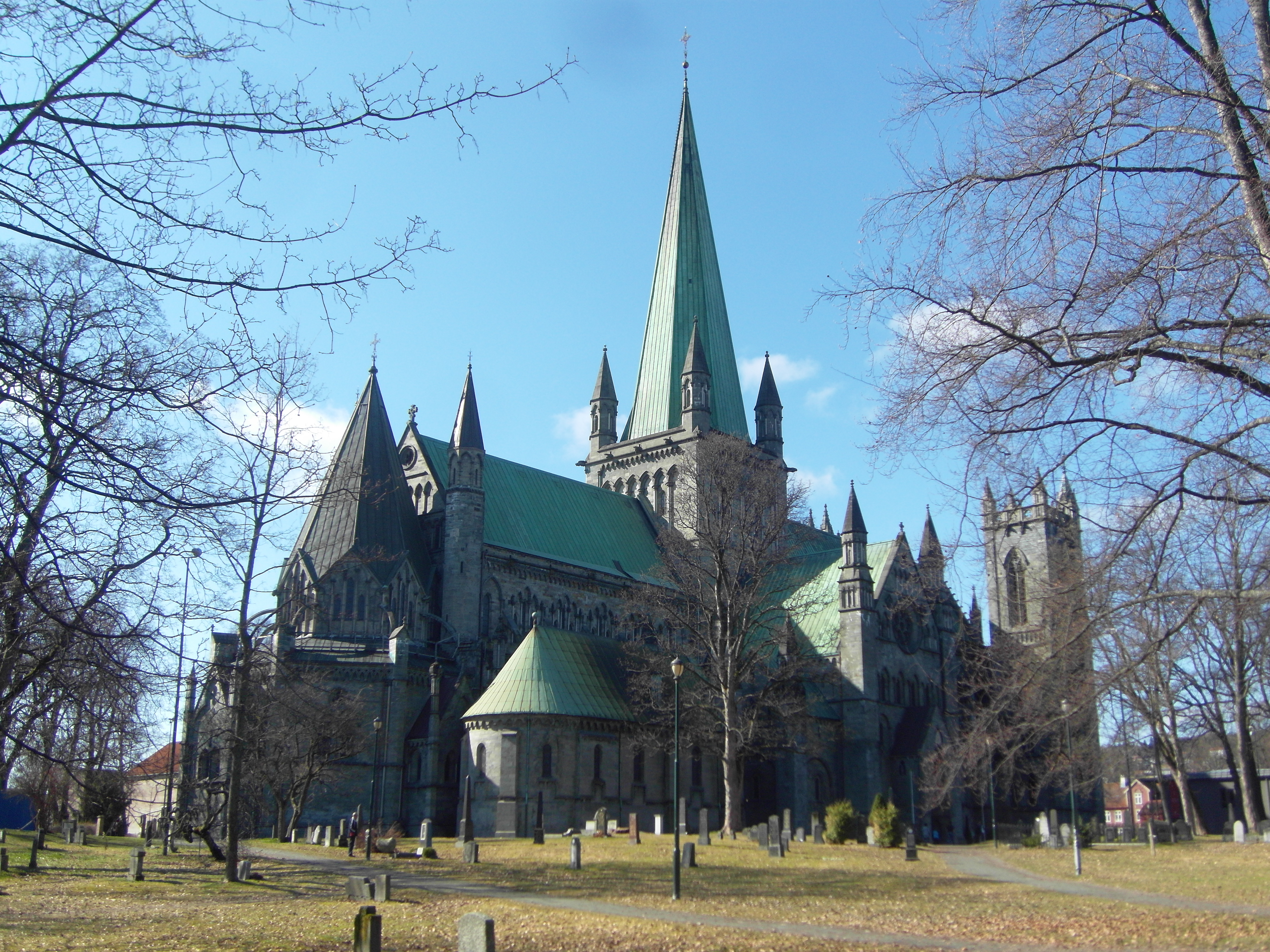
From north-east in 2011

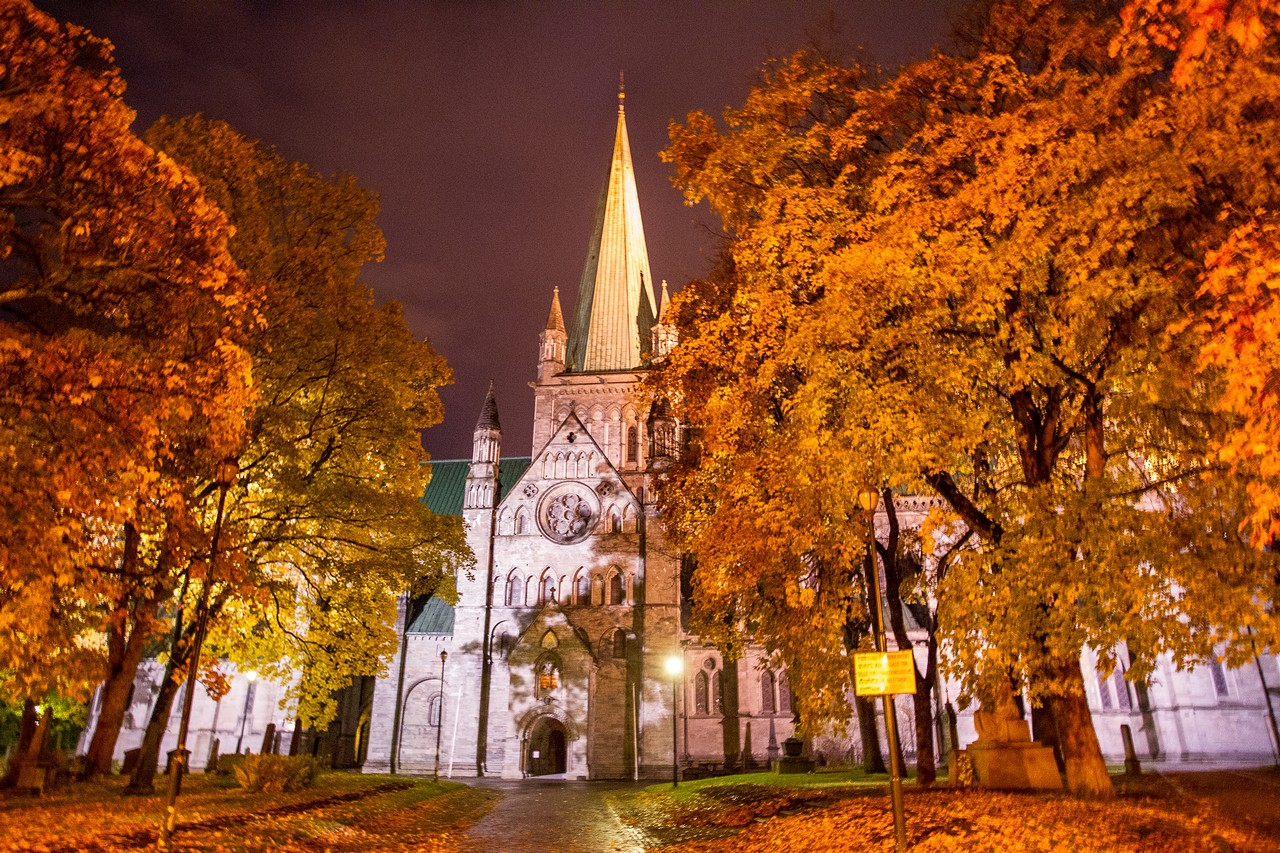
At night

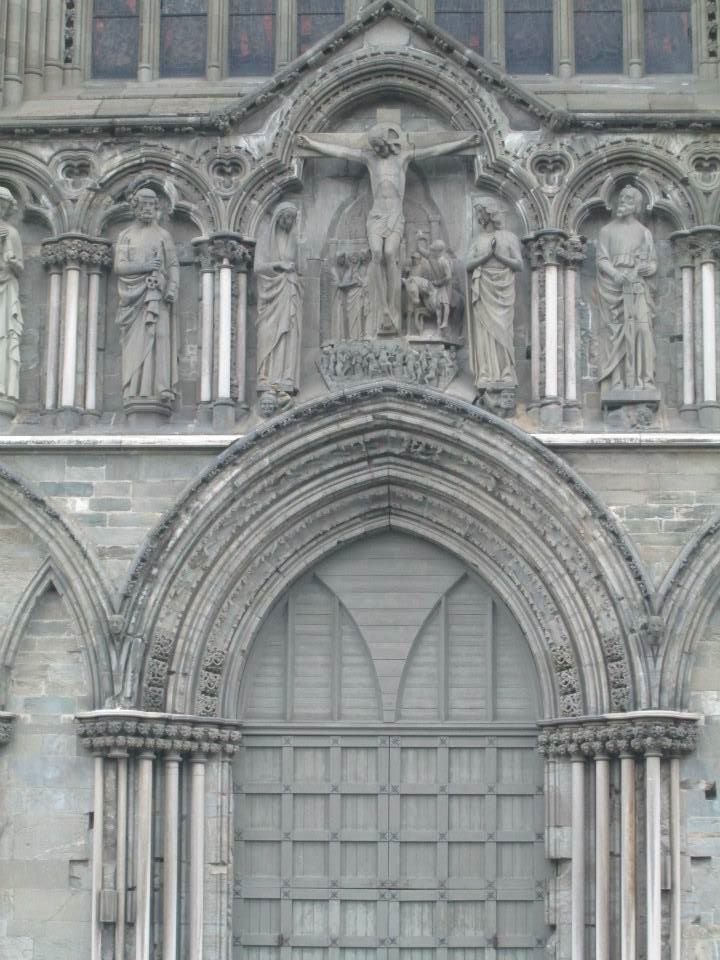
Detail of west front

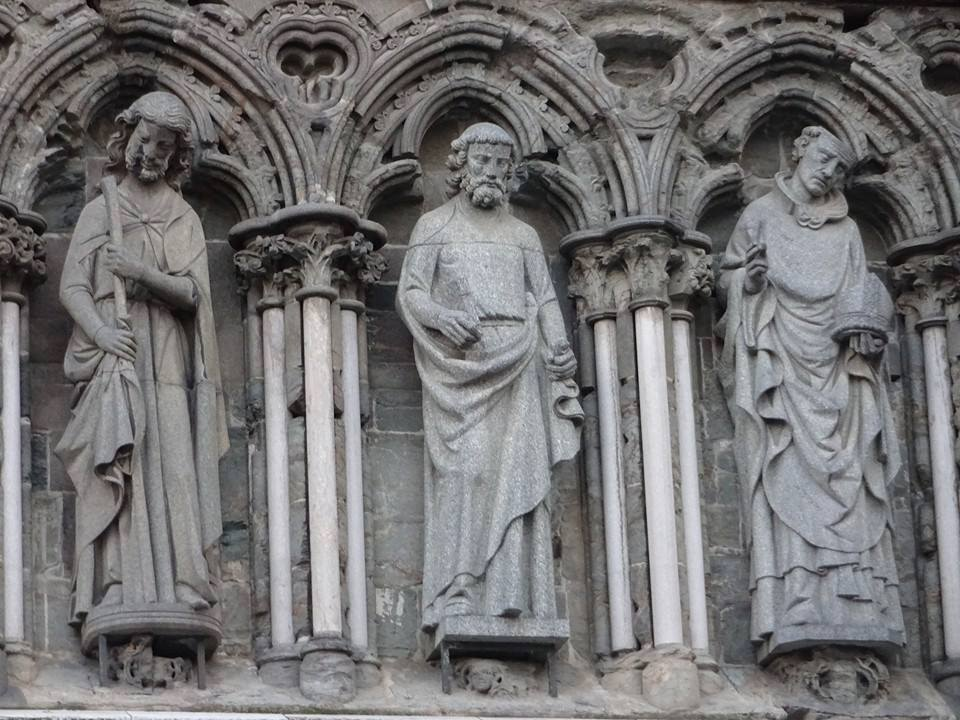
Statues on west front

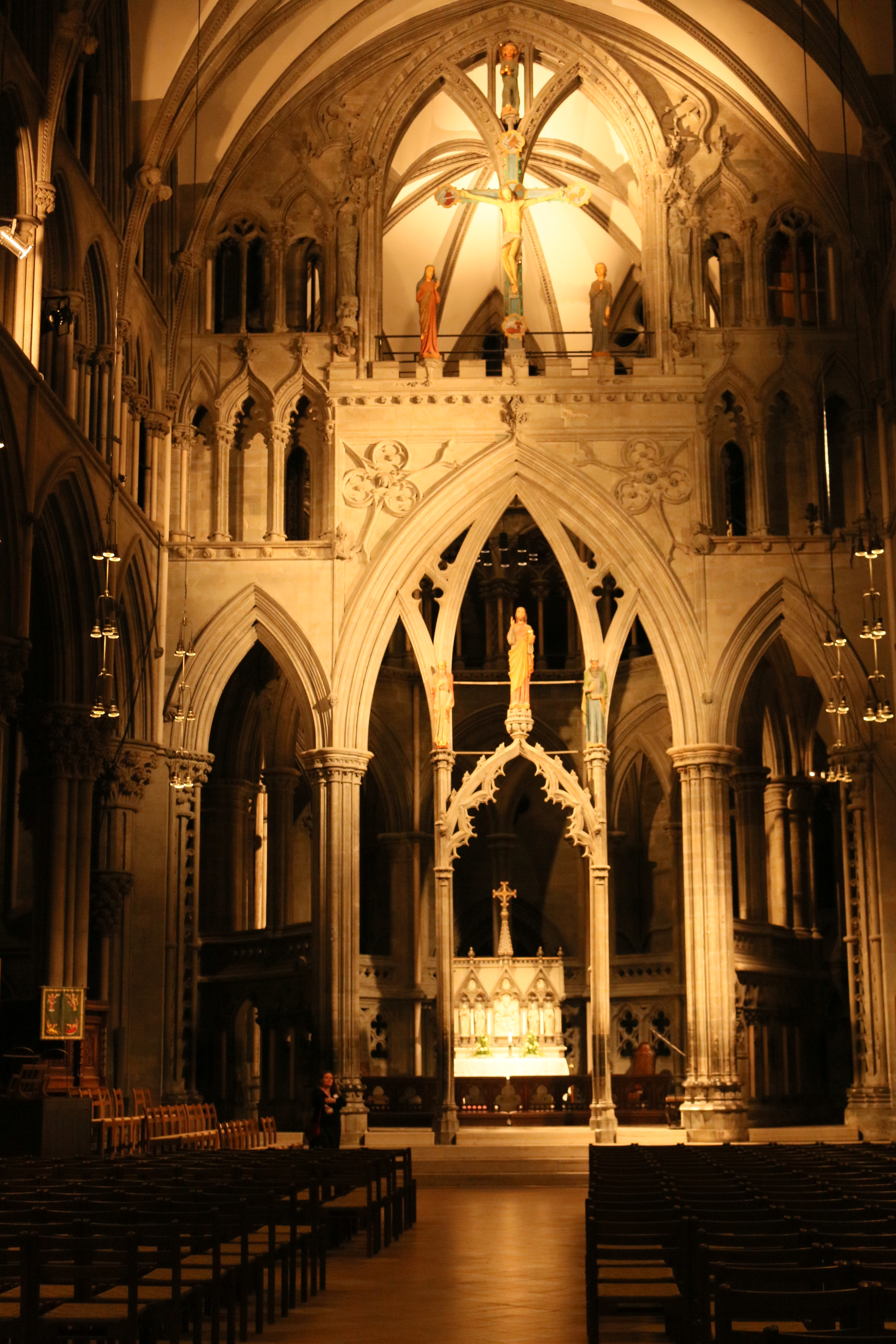
The altar

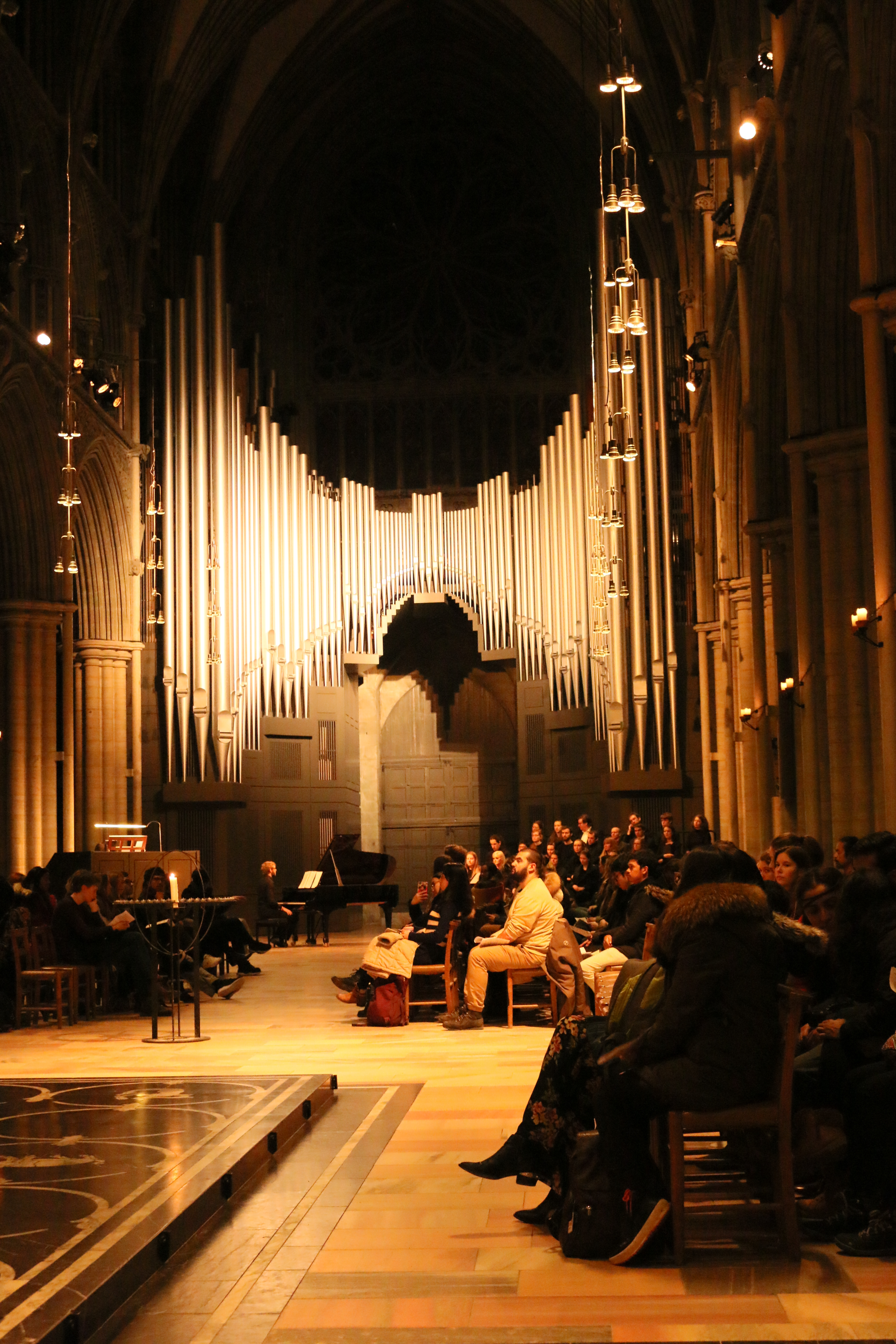
organ

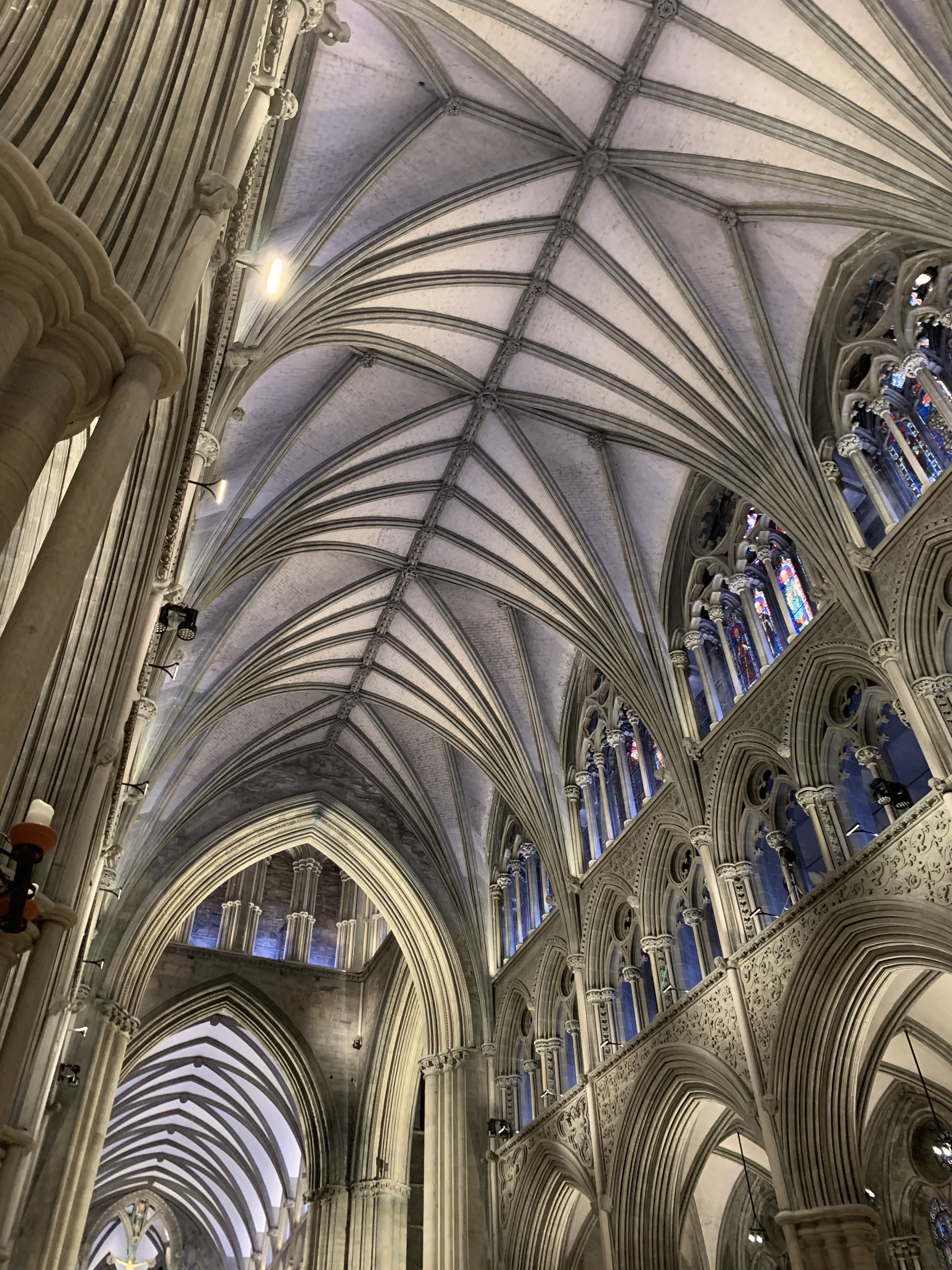
Ceiling

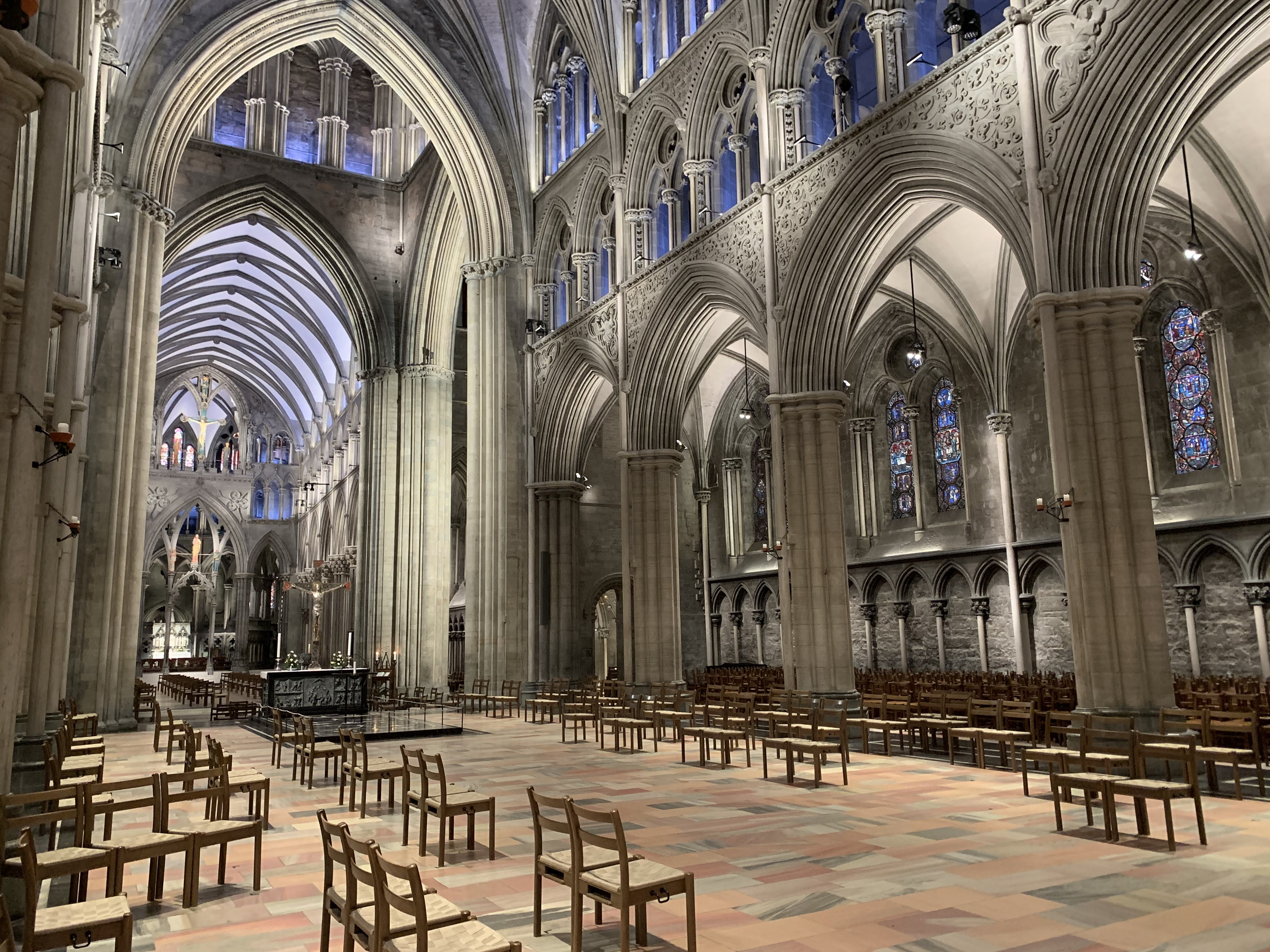
Interior

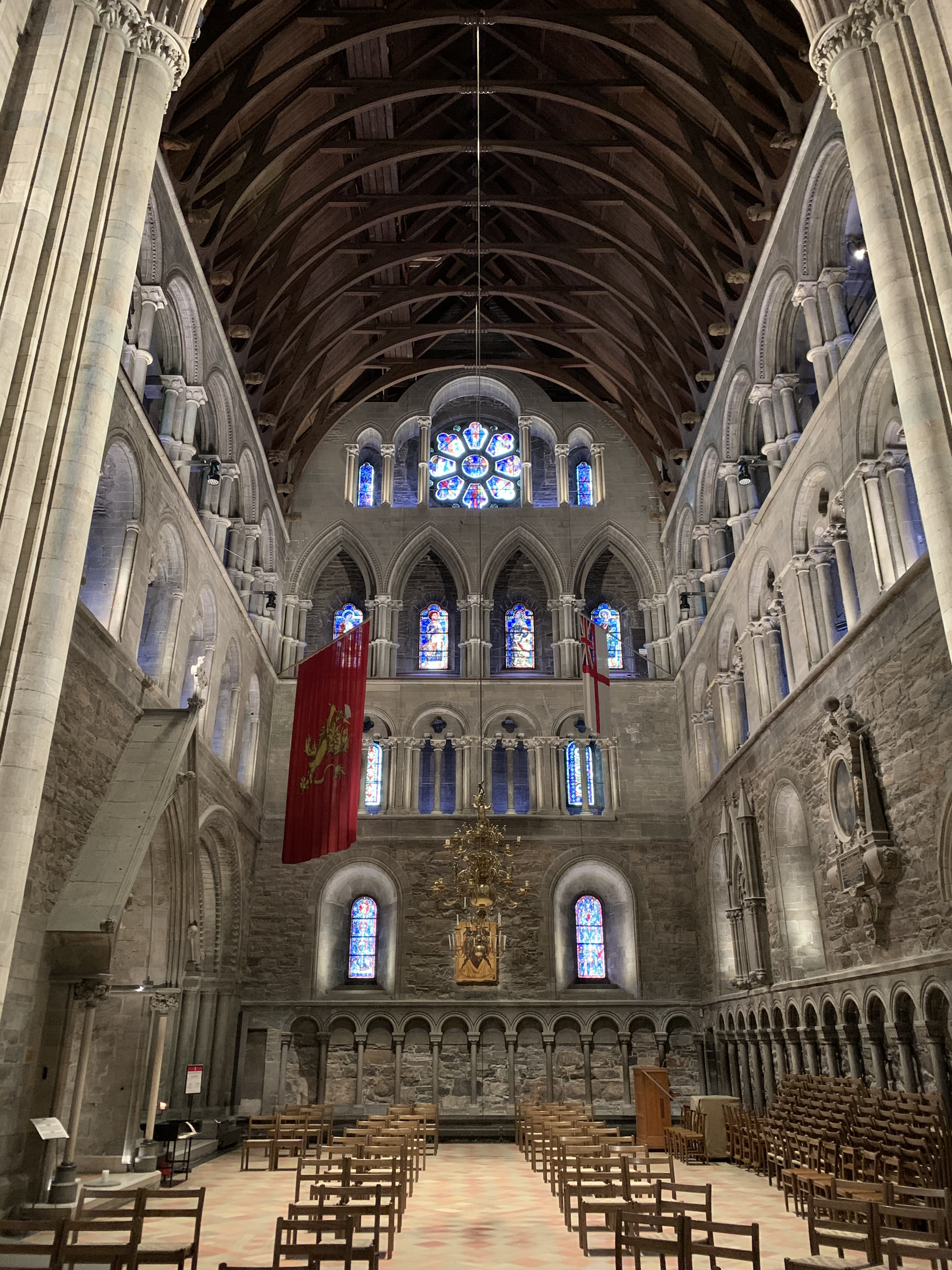
Interior

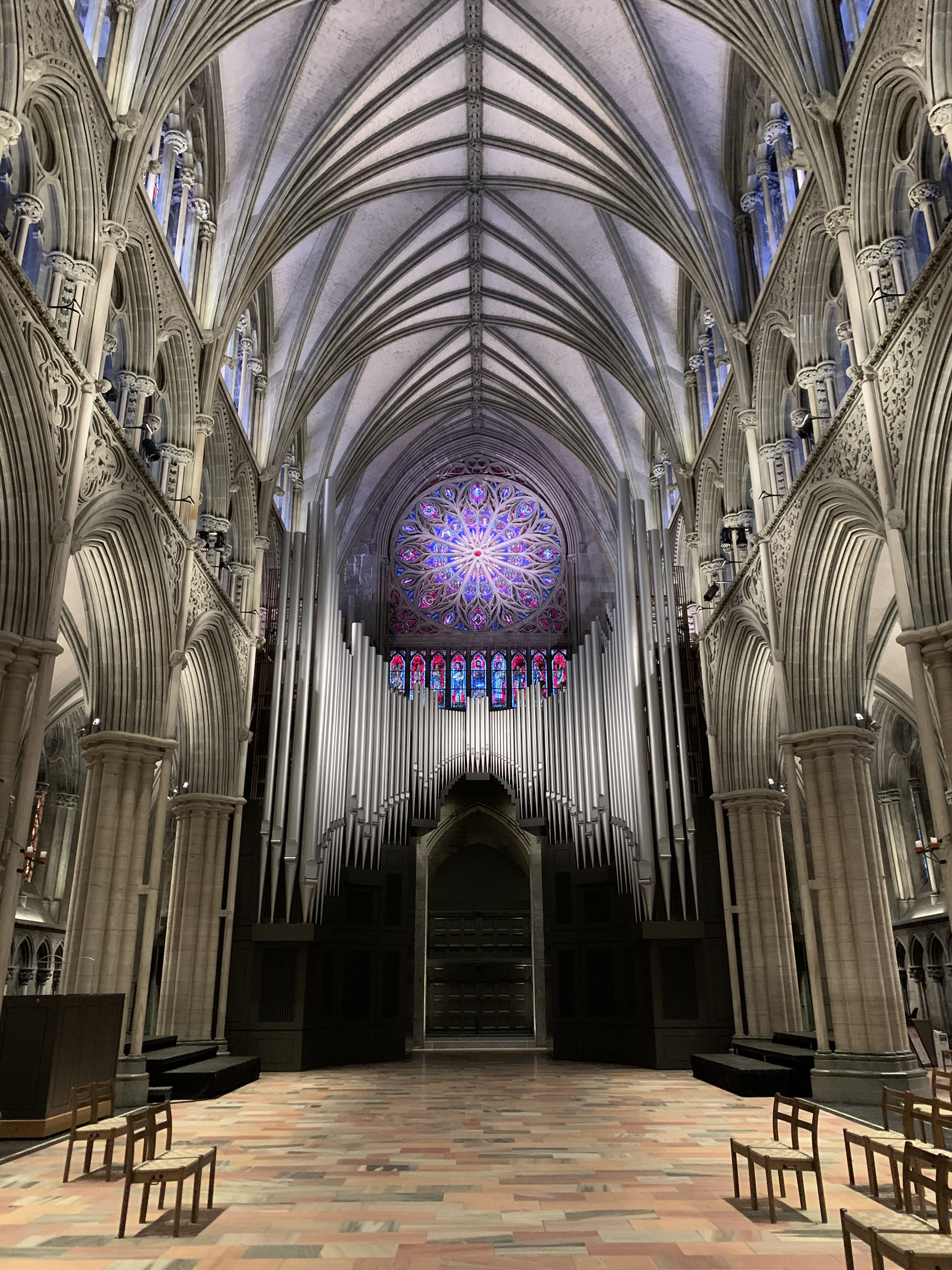
Interior

== Choirs ==
- Nidaros Cathedral Choir
- Nidaros Cathedral Boys' Choir
- Nidaros Cathedral Girls' Choir
- Schola Sancta Sunnivae
- Nidaros Vocalis
- Nidaros Oratory Choir

== Alleged bombing plot ==
The cathedral is also familiar to enthusiasts of Norwegian black metal, as it is featured on the cover artwork of De Mysteriis Dom Sathanas, the 1994 studio album by Mayhem. It was rumored that members of the band who had already been associated with the burnings of other Christian churches in Norway had planned to destroy the cathedral in relation to the release of the album. When police arrested former Mayhem bassist Varg Vikernes on 19 August 1993 they had found 150 kilograms (330 lb) of explosives in his home.

== See also ==
- List of churches in Nidaros
- List of cathedrals in Norway
- Nidaros
- Pilgrim's Route
- De Mysteriis Dom Sathanas
- High medieval domes

== References and notes ==
=== Literature ===
- Danbolt, Gunnar (1997). Nidarosdomen, fra Kristkirke til nasjonalmonument (in Norwegian). Andresen & Butenschøn. ISBN 82-7694-024-2.* Ekroll, Øystein (2006). Nidaros Cathedral: The West Front Sculptures. Trondheim Nidarosdomen. ISBN 978-82-7693-063-4.
- Ekroll, Øystein; Krokstad, Jill; Søreide, Tove, eds. (1995). Nidaros Cathedral: And the archbishop's palace. Nidaros Domkirkes Restaureringsarbeide. ISBN 978-82-7693-017-7.
- Flekk, Torgeir (1983). Nidaros Cathedral: The Stained Glass. Nidaros Domkirkes Restaureringsarbeider. ISBN 978-82-90536-00-3.
- Hansen, Knut Ingar (1997). Pilegrimsgang til Nidaros (in Norwegian). Gyldendal Tide. ISBN 978-82-478-0028-7.
- Kollandsrud, Mari (1997). Pilgrimsleden til Nidaros (in Norwegian). Gyldendal. ISBN 978-82-05-24786-4.
- Luthen, Eivind (1992). I pilegrimenes fotspor til Nidaros (in Norwegian). Cappelen. ISBN 978-82-02-13249-1.
- Raju, Alison (2010). Pilgrim Road to Nidaros, The: St Olav's Way - Oslo to Trondheim. Cicerone Press Limited. ISBN 978-1-85284-314-4.
- Schirmer, Herman Major (2012). Kristkirken I Nidaros (in Norwegian). Nabu Press. ISBN 978-1-273-58143-4.
- Suul, Torgeir Flekk (1983). Nidarosdomen - glassmaleriene. Translated by Stevens, Michael. Nidaros Domkirkes Restaureringsarbeider. ISBN 978-82-90536-00-3.
- Thue, Stein (2008). On the Pilgrim Way to Trondheim. Akademika Publishing. ISBN 978-82-519-2303-3.
