= Nidaros Cathedral Boys' Choir =

Norwegian choir in Trondheim

- Choir
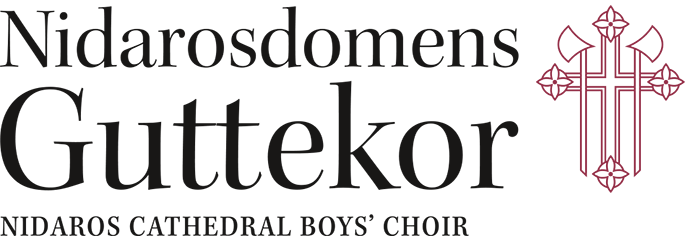
- Revised (2014) choir logo with English caption
- Origin: Trondheim, Norway
- Founded: 11th-12th century
- Members: 60 boys 30 men
- Chief conductor: Thomas Berg-Juul
- Affiliation: Nidaros Cathedral
- Website: www.guttekor.no

The Nidaros Cathedral Boys' Choir (Chorus Puerorum Cathedralis Nidrosiensis) is a Norwegian choir in Trondheim, consisting of 76 boys and men as of spring 2008. It represents a tradition of boy and men cathedral choristers in Nidaros Cathedral stretching back almost 900 years. As of 2007, the choir is one of the leading boys' choirs in Europe and has built an international reputation through tours, performances in radio and TV, as well as numerous CD-recordings. The present artistic director and conductor is Thomas Berg-Juul.

== History ==
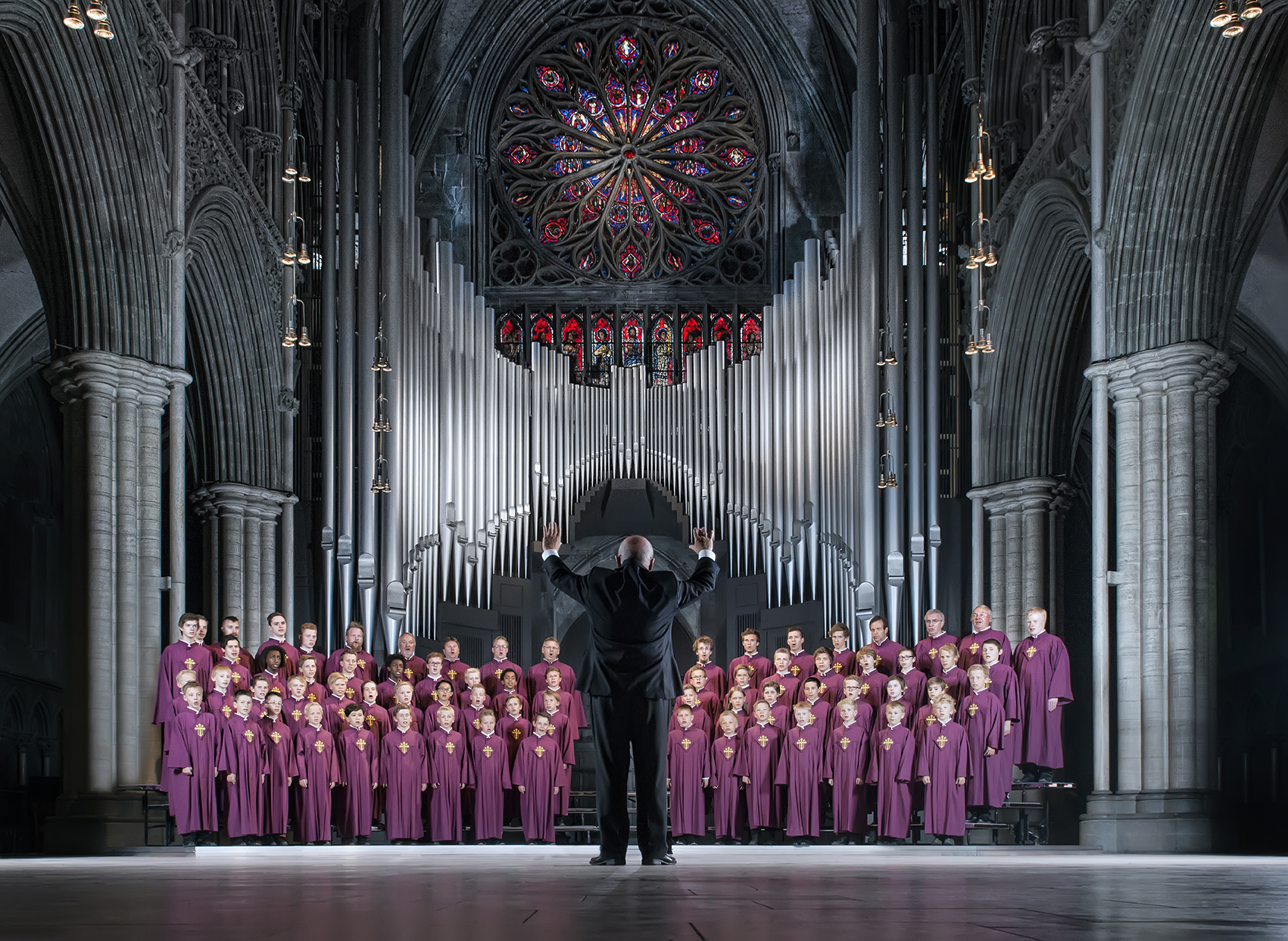
Prize winning photo of the Nidaros Cathedral Boys' Choir taken in the Nidaros Cathedral in front of the new organ by Dag Asle Langø in 2014.

Nidaros Cathedral Boys' Choir with conductor Bjørn Moe.

Nidaros Cathedral Boys' Choir singing Hallelujah (Messiah) in Frogner Church, 4 December 2024

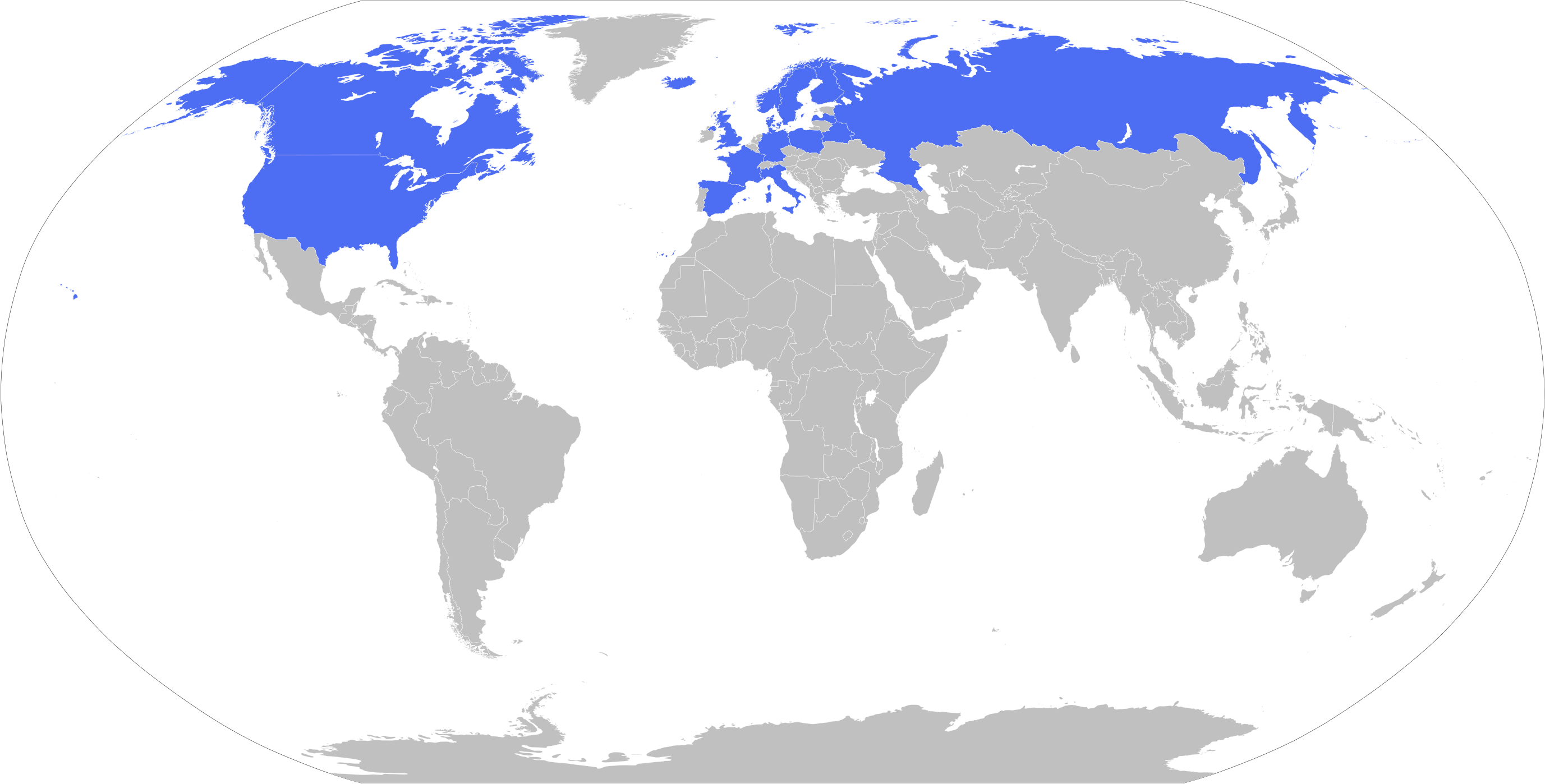
Overview of countries where the Nidaros Cathedral Boys' Choir has held concerts.

The Nidaros Cathedral Boys' Choir has been closely linked to Trondheim Katedralskole (the Cathedral School), across the street from the cathedral, for 900 years. The choir held its regular rehearsals there for many years. At the end of the 11th century Norwegian and English stone carvers came to Trondheim to build the Christ Church, the predecessor to the cathedral. In one of the chapels the stonecarvers' sons were instructed by the clergymen in Gregorian chant and liturgy, and the boys sang at masses, just like today's choir. This was the beginning of Trondheim Cathedral School and the tradition of a boys' choir in the cathedral. New classrooms were soon built near the church - probably where the school is situated today.

In 1806 the official bonds to the Cathedral School were broken. From then on the song duty was attended to by the Common Parish School, and from 1862 by the Waisenhuset school (Orphanage school) until 1905. For 22 years Trondheim had no boys' choir. But when planning the 900th anniversary of the death of St. Olav, chaplain Arne Fjellbu, later to become bishop, took the initiative to establish a new boys' choir in Trondheim.

In the autumn of 1927 Nidaros Cathedral Boys' Choir was re-established under the leadership of conductor Erik Saltnessand.

Organist Ludvig Nielsen was the conductor from 1948 to 1973.

Bjørn Moe was the conductor of the choir from 1973 to 2023.

Thomas Berg-Juul took over as conductor in 2023.

== Discography ==
- Jul i Nidarosdomen (1992)
- Laudate (1994)
- Julekveld (1995)
- Våre vakreste salmer og sanger (1996)
- Snørosa with Åge Aleksandersen, Ulf Risnes and Bjarne Brøndbo (1996)
- Stille Natt with Arve Tellefsen (1998)
- Jul med guttekoret (1999)
- Våre beste julesanger with Arve Tellefsen (2001)
- Evige Øyeblikk (2003)
- Frelsesarmeens Julesanger, a charity-record for the Norwegian Salvation Army, with Ole Edvard Antonsen (2004)
- Aria with Arve Tellefsen (2006)
- I Wish (2008)
- Julestemning i Nidarosdomen (2012)
- Juletrompeten with Kai Robert (2016)
- Løvetann (2024)
