= Åge Aleksandersen =

Norwegian singer, songwriter and guitarist

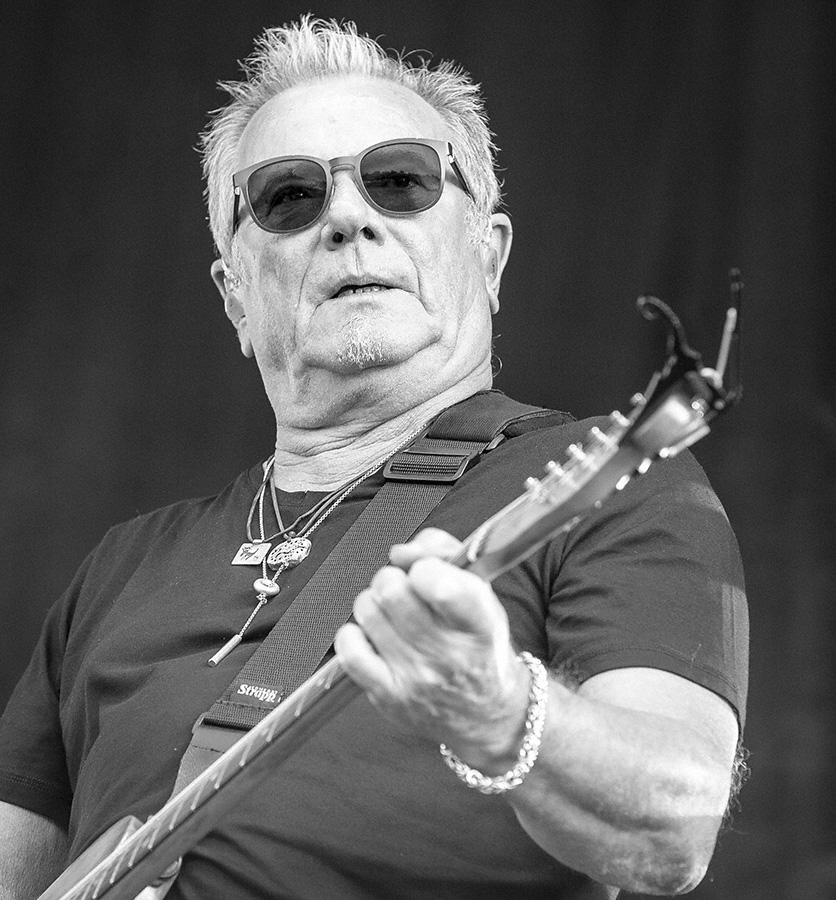
- Åge Aleksandersen at Stavernfestivalen in 2016

Background information
- Born: Namsos, Trøndelag, Norway
- Genres: Pop, Rock
- Years active: 1965–present
- Labels: Plateselskapet A/S (1981–present)

Åge Aleksandersen (born 21 March 1949) is a Norwegian singer, songwriter and guitarist. He is one of his country's best known musicians. Some of his most well known songs are "Lys og varme" ("Light and Warmth"), "Fire pils og en pizza" ("Four Beers and a Pizza"), Levva Livet (Living Life) and "Rosalita".

Together with Sambandet, he participated in Melodi Grand Prix 1980 with the song "Bjørnen sover" ("The Bear Is Sleeping"), ultimately coming second. He also wrote and performed "Snørosa" ("The Snowrose"), the official song of the 1997 Nordic skiing World Championship (held in Trondheim) together with two other musicians from the region, Ulf Risnes and Bjarne Brøndbo and the Nidaros Cathedral Boys' Choir.

Aleksandersen has sold almost 1.5 million copies of his many albums in Norway alone.

== Discography ==
=== Albums ===
As a member of Prudence

- 1972: Tomorrow May Be Vanished
- 1973: Drunk and Happy
- 1974: No. 3
- 1975: Takk te dokk
- 1976: 11/12-75

Solo albums

- 1975: 7800 Namsos (7500 copies sold)
- 1976: Mot i brystet, mord i blikket, Bomben und Granaten' (3000)
- 1977: Lirekassa (15000)
- 1979: French only (30000)
- 1980: Ramp (60000)
- 1981: Mølje og sodd (75000) - Note: this was a cassette-only release featuring 8 tracks as well as some comedy skits in which Aleksandersen did not perform. Since the cassettes were poor quality, and this type of cassette is intended for car listening, this is an extreme rarity today.
- 1982: Dains me mæ (80000) - Note: double album, one studio album, one live. Also features the short song "Saturday Cowboys", actually Aleksandersen's introduction to the so named new wave group when Aleksandersen was a guest host on a music show on Norwegian TV.
- 1984: Levva livet (275000) - Note: cassette version features an additional instrumental version of the song "Café Farvel".
- 1984: Lys og varme (80000)
- 1985: 'Ljus och värme (50000) - Swedish language version of Lys og varme
- 1986: Eldorado (260000)
- 1989: Solregn (160000)
- 1990: Sanger (best of) (10000)
- 1991: Laika (45000)
- 1993: Din dag (65000)
- 1995: Med hud og hår (65000)
- 1997: Snørosa - Note: with Ulf Risnes, Bjarne Brøndbo and Nidaros Cathedral Boys' Choir
- 1997: Fredløs - Dylan på norsk (15000) - Note: Outlaw - Bob Dylan in Norwegian
- 1999: Flyg avsted (55000)
- 2000: Gamle ørn (35000)
- 2001: Åge Original (30000)
- 2002: Linedans (45000)
- 2005: To skritt fram
- 2006: Snöharpan
- 2008: Katalysator
- 2011: Furet værbitt
- 2014: Sukker og Salt

=== EPs ===
- 2010: Big-5: Åge Aleksandersen (2010)

=== Live albums ===
- 2005: 4 skritt tilbake (live album from the 2004 tour)
- 2016: De e langt å gå til Royal Albert Hall

=== Singles ===
- 1976: "Mot i brystet, mord i blikket, bomben und granaten/Båtvise"
- 1977: "Positivet"
- 1979: "The Pacifier/14 Pages"
- 1980: "Bjørnen sover/Stanga haue i væggen"
- 1981: "Kom bli med mæ no i natt/Blått hav"
- 1984: "Lys og varme"
- 1985: "Ljus och värme/Fyra öl och en pizza" (Swedish version)
- 1991: "Akkurat no"
- 1993: "Min dag/Stormen"
- 1994: "Fire pils og en pizza"
- 1995: "Med hud og hår"
- 1997: "Æ vil ha dæ"
- 2000: "Myggen"
- 2005: "To skritt frem"
- 2005: "Alkymisten"
- 2005: "Danserinnen"
- 2006: "Jag har drömt"
- 2007: "Sommernatt"
- 2008: "Janne Ahonens smil"
- 2011: "Medvind"

=== With other artists ===
- Mitt lille land (2011)
