= Klaver =

Klaver (Dutch pronunciation: [ˈklaːvər]), meaning clover, is a Dutch surname. People with this name include:

- Beau Klaver, American politician
- Jesse Klaver (born 1986), Dutch politician
- Karel Klaver (born 1978), Dutch field hockey player
- Lieke Klaver (born 1998), Dutch track athlete
- Luite Klaver (1870–1960), Dutch painter
- Melody Klaver (born 1990), Dutch actress

== See also ==
- Klever
- Cleaver (surname)
