= Vår Frue Church =

Church in Trøndelag, Norway

- Vår Frue kirke
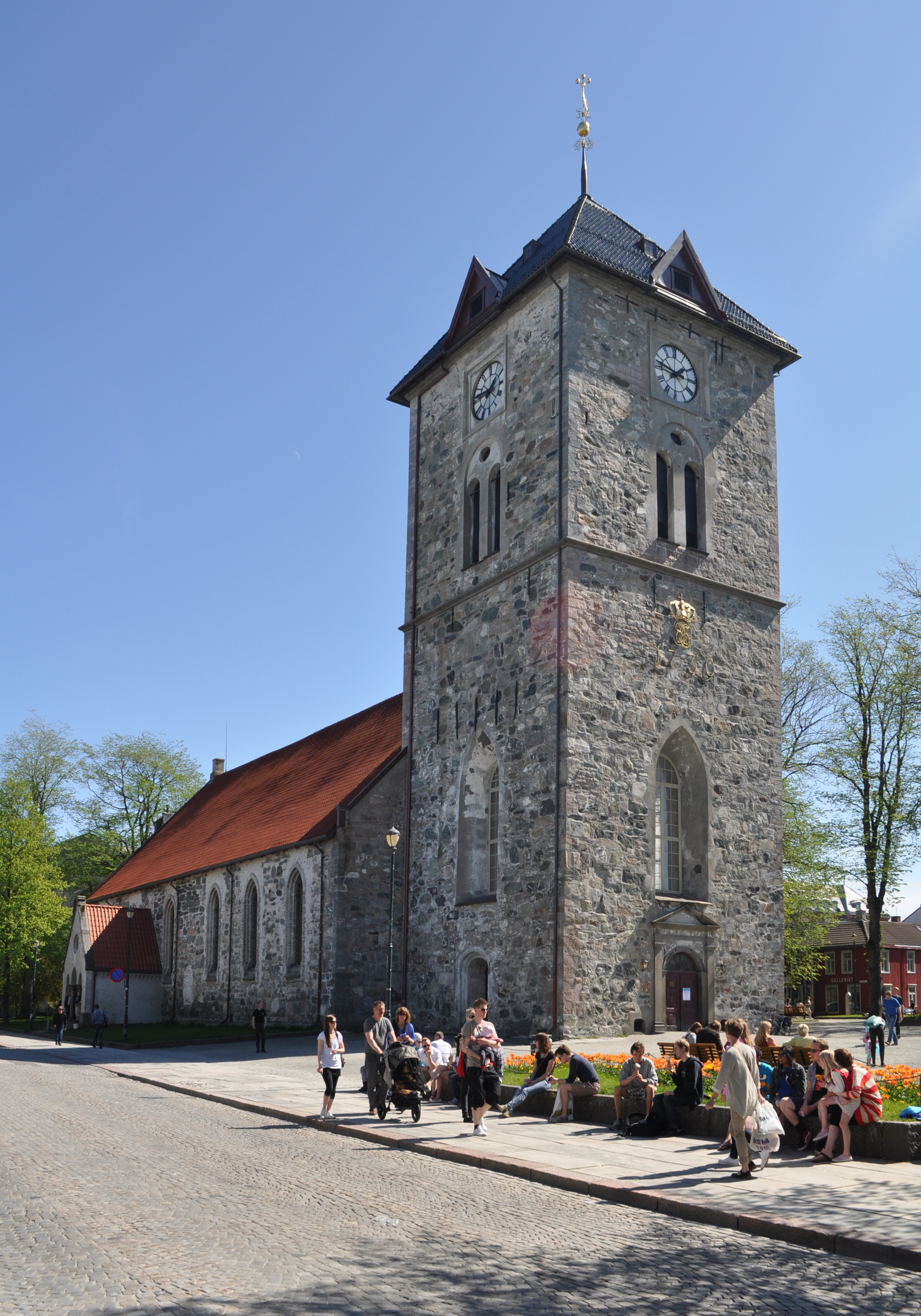
- View of the church
- Vår Frue Church
- 63.430168702°N 10.3981620669°E
- Location: Trondheim Municipality, Trøndelag
- Country: Norway
- Denomination: Church of Norway
- Previous denomination: Catholic Church
- Churchmanship: Evangelical Lutheran

History
- Status: Parish church
- Founded: 12th century
- Dedication: Mary (mother of Jesus)
- Consecrated: 12th century

Architecture
- Functional status: Active
- Architect: Bjørn Sigvardsson
- Architectural type: Long church
- Style: Romanesque and Gothic
- Completed: c. 1180 (846 years ago)

Specifications
- Capacity: 540
- Materials: Stone

Administration
- Diocese: Nidaros bispedømme
- Deanery: Nidaros domprosti
- Parish: Nidaros og Vår Frue
- Norwegian Cultural Heritage Site
- Type: Church
- Status: Automatically protected

Vår Frue Church (Norwegian: Vår Frue kirke / English: Our Lady's Church) is a medieval parish church of the Church of Norway in Trondheim Municipality in Trøndelag county, Norway. It is located in the downtown Midtbyen area of the city of Trondheim, just a few blocks north of the Nidaros Cathedral. It is one of the two churches for the Nidaros og Vår Frue parish which is part of the Nidaros domprosti (arch-deanery) in the Diocese of Nidaros. The gray, stone church was built in a long church design in the late 1100s using plans drawn up by Bjørn Sigvardsson. The church seats about 540 people.

== History ==
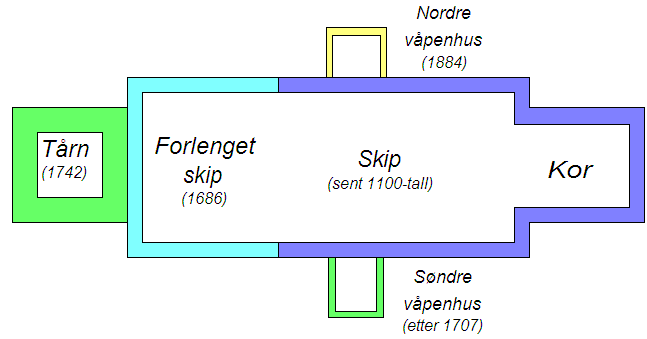
Drawing of Vår Frue kirke with dates of construction. The choir is on the right, the nave in the centre, and the tower on the left. There are two small entry porches on the top and bottom of the diagram as well.

The church was first constructed during the mid- to late-1100s by Bjørn Sigvardsson. It is a stone long church with features of both the Romanesque and Gothic architectural style. The date of construction is not known for sure, but the church celebrated its 800th anniversary in 2007. It was originally called Mariakirken (St. Mary's Church), but has since the 15th century it has been referred to as Vår Frue kirke (Our Lady's Church).

The medieval church has seen its share of fires and restorations. In 1651, the church (and 90% of the city's buildings) was destroyed in a great city fire. Afterwards, only the walls remained. Nevertheless, some of the furniture was rescued, and gifts poured in afterwards that made it possible to rebuild and redecorate the church. The church burned again in 1681 and 1708.

In 1686, the church nave was expanded westward, with the masonry in the original eastern parts preserved. Afterwards, the total length of the church measured 64 metres (210 ft). From 1739 to 1742, the church underwent a large renovation project. During this time, a new tower with a flat roof was built on the west end. In 1779, the roof of the tower was changed to have a pyramid-shaped roof with a new spire on top. Throughout the 1700s, the church transitioned into having baroque decor.

In 1814, the church, along with over 300 others across Norway, served as an election church (Norwegian: valgkirke) for elections to the Norwegian Constituent Assembly which wrote the Constitution of Norway.

Much of the Baroque and Rococo interior were removed in a restoration in the 1880s, led by architect Christian Christie (1832-1906), who also worked on the restoration of the Nidaros Cathedral. Christie made simplifications to the interior to bring it back partly to its former medieval appearance. From 1957 to 1959, a new refurbishment was conducted, led by architect John Egil Tverdahl (1890-1969). During this time, the church had its whitewashed exterior removed. The exterior masonry was knocked off so that the cobblestone stood bare as during the Medieval period.

The altarpiece was originally carved for Nidaros Cathedral by Heinrich Kühnemann (1711-1792) and dates to between 1742 and 1744. It was painted by J.N. Schavenius, and has figures cut by Jonas Granberg (1696-1776). In 1837 it was transferred to Vår Frue kirke. The pulpit was made in 1771 and it was restored 1957–1959. The baptismal font in the church is from 1898.

== Media gallery ==
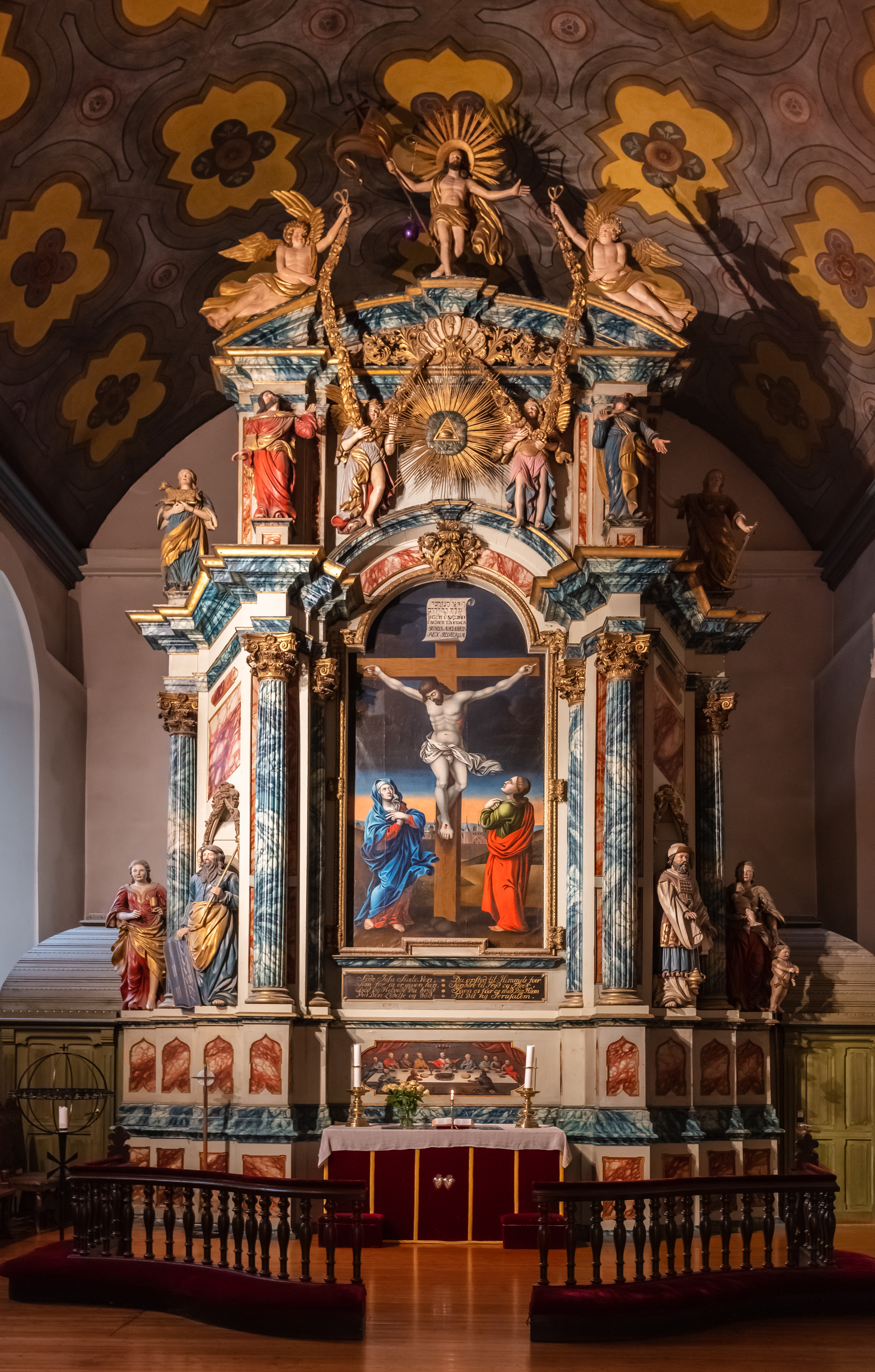
Altar and altarpiece of Vår Frue kirke

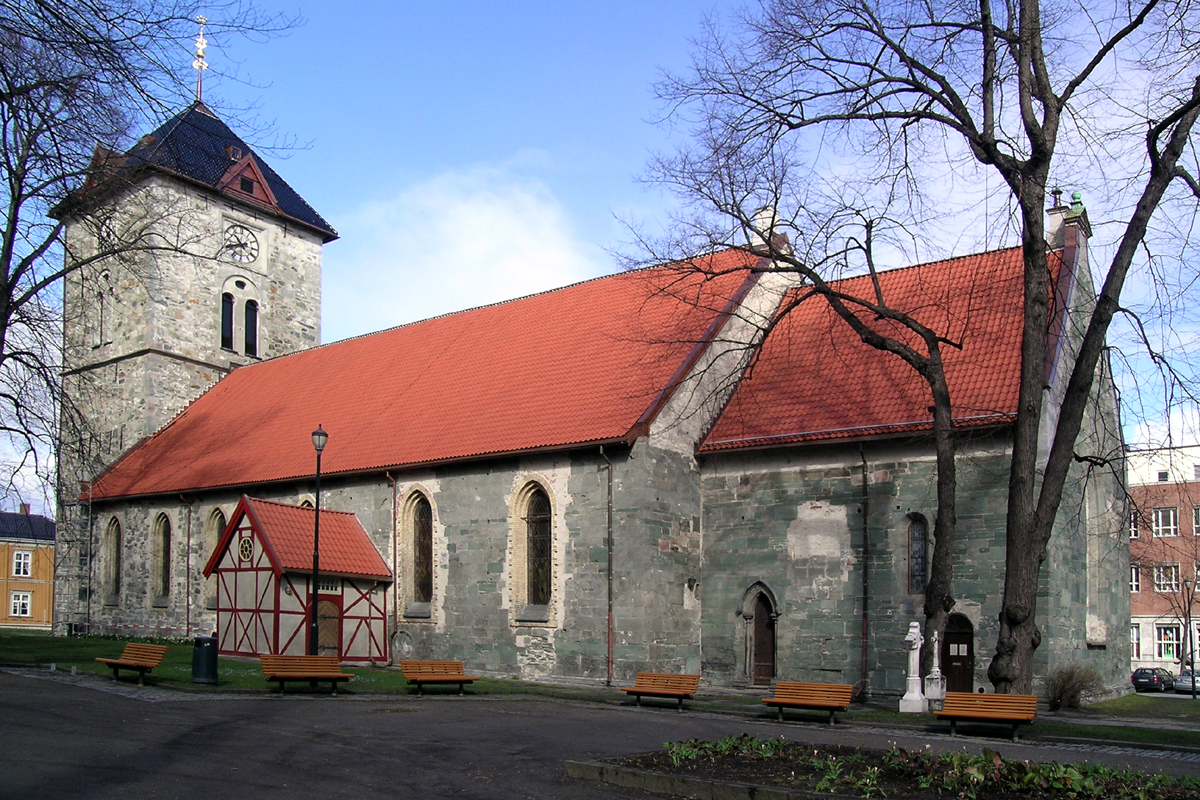
Side view of Vår Frue kirke

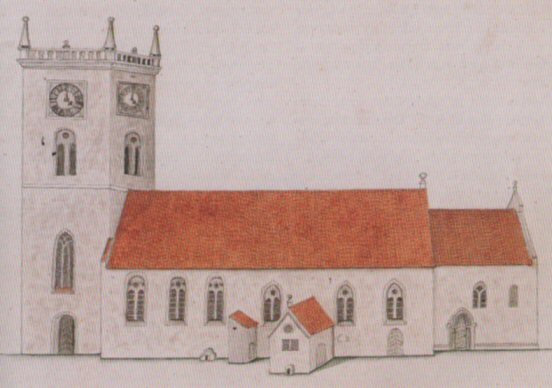
Drawing of Vår Frue kirke with the old flat-roofed tower from c. 1770

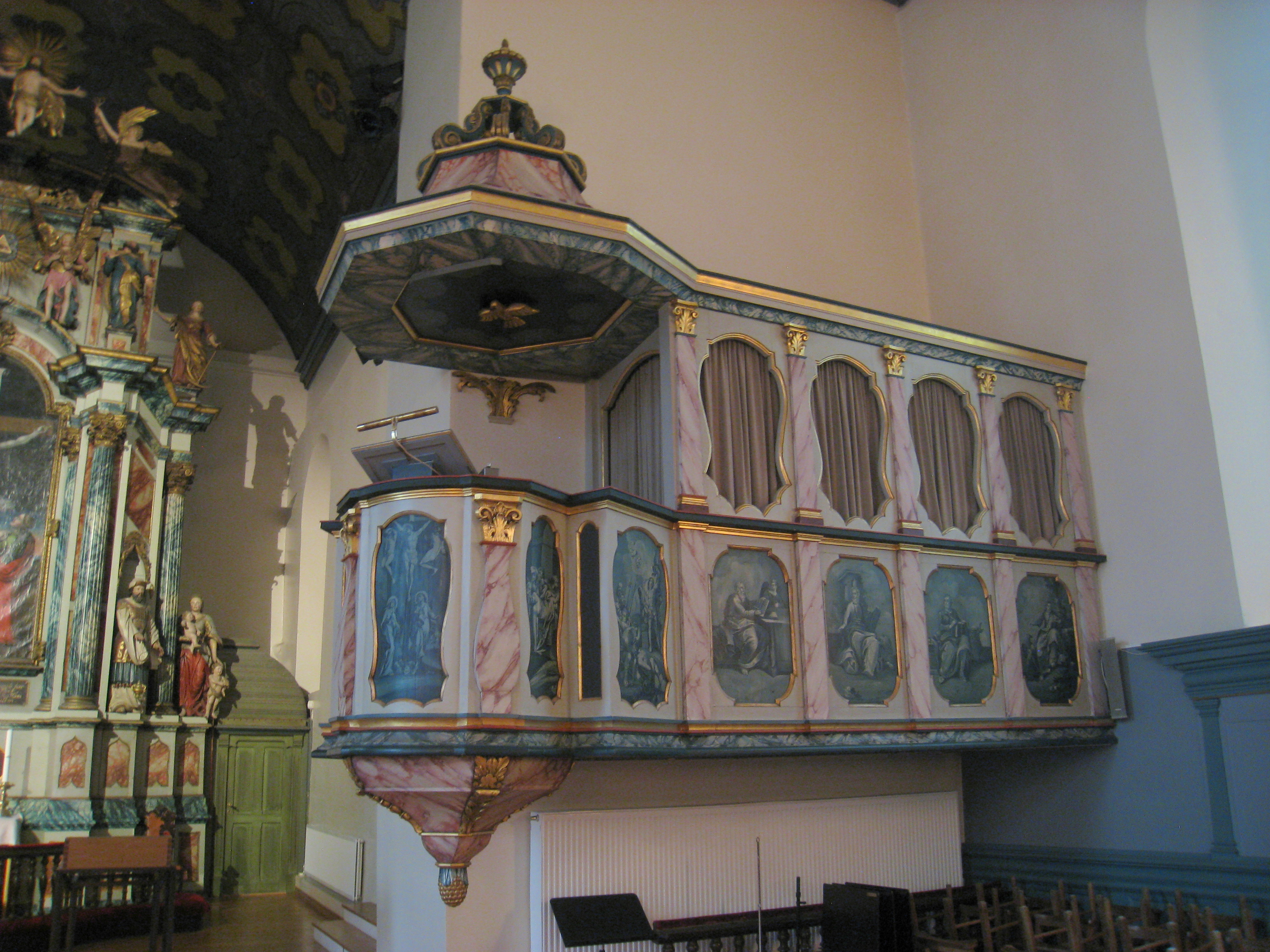
Pulpit at Vår Frue kirke

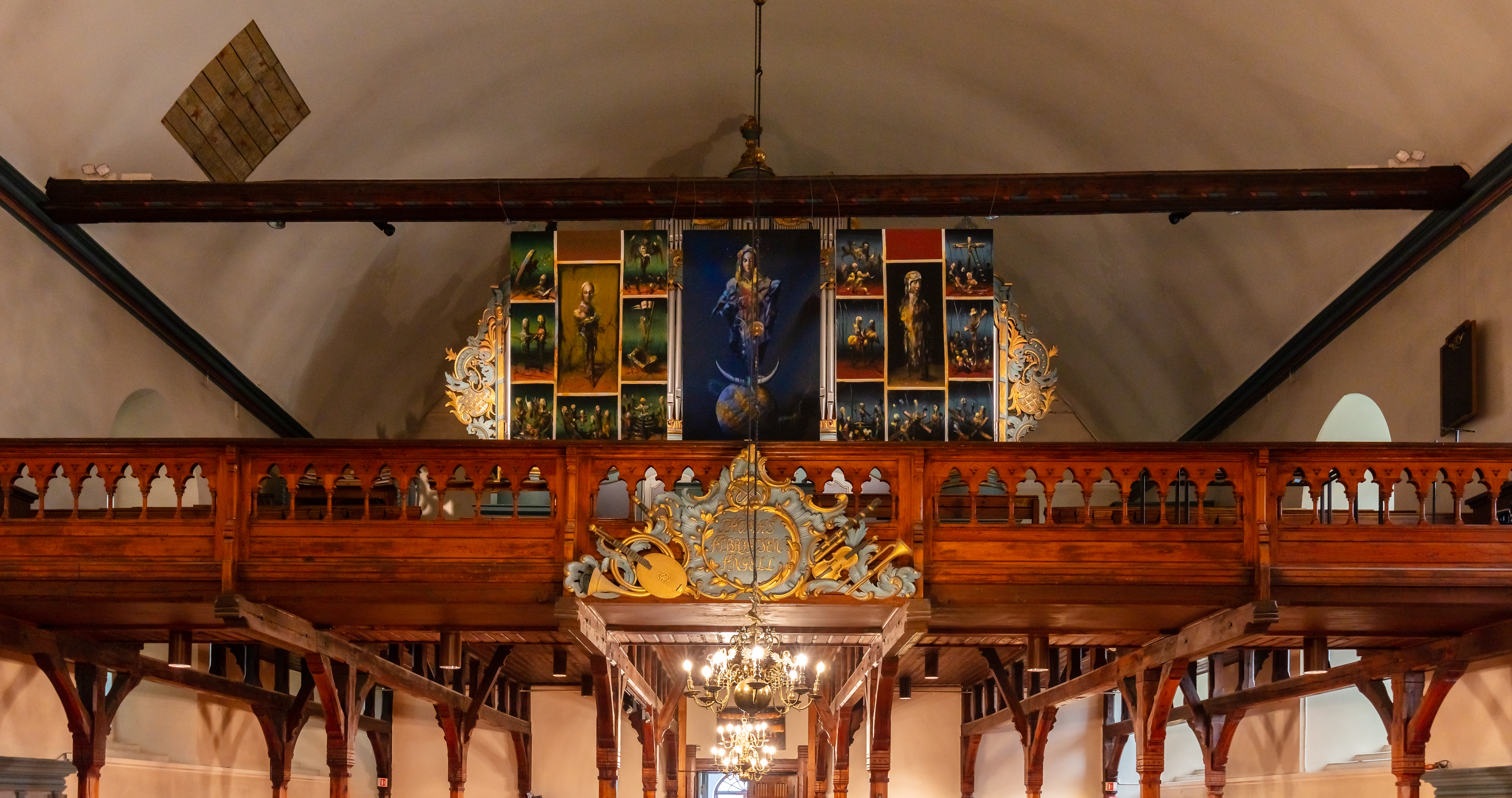
View of the organ and back of the church

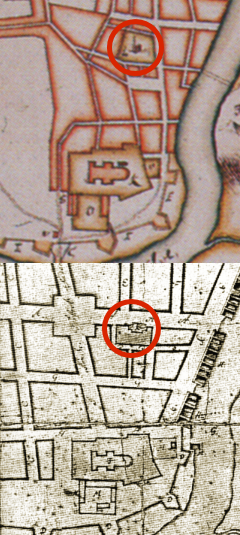
Location on old maps

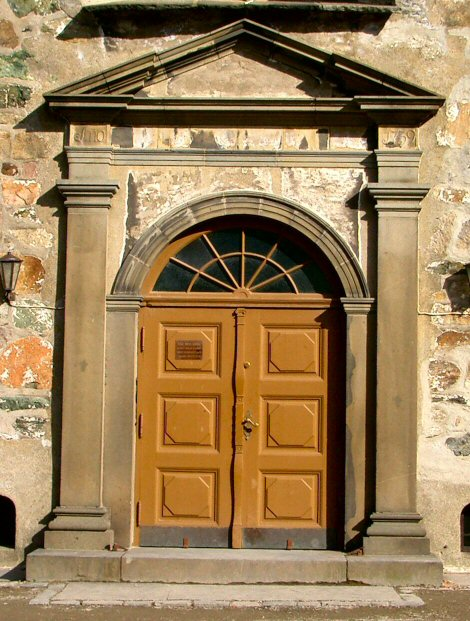
View of the door

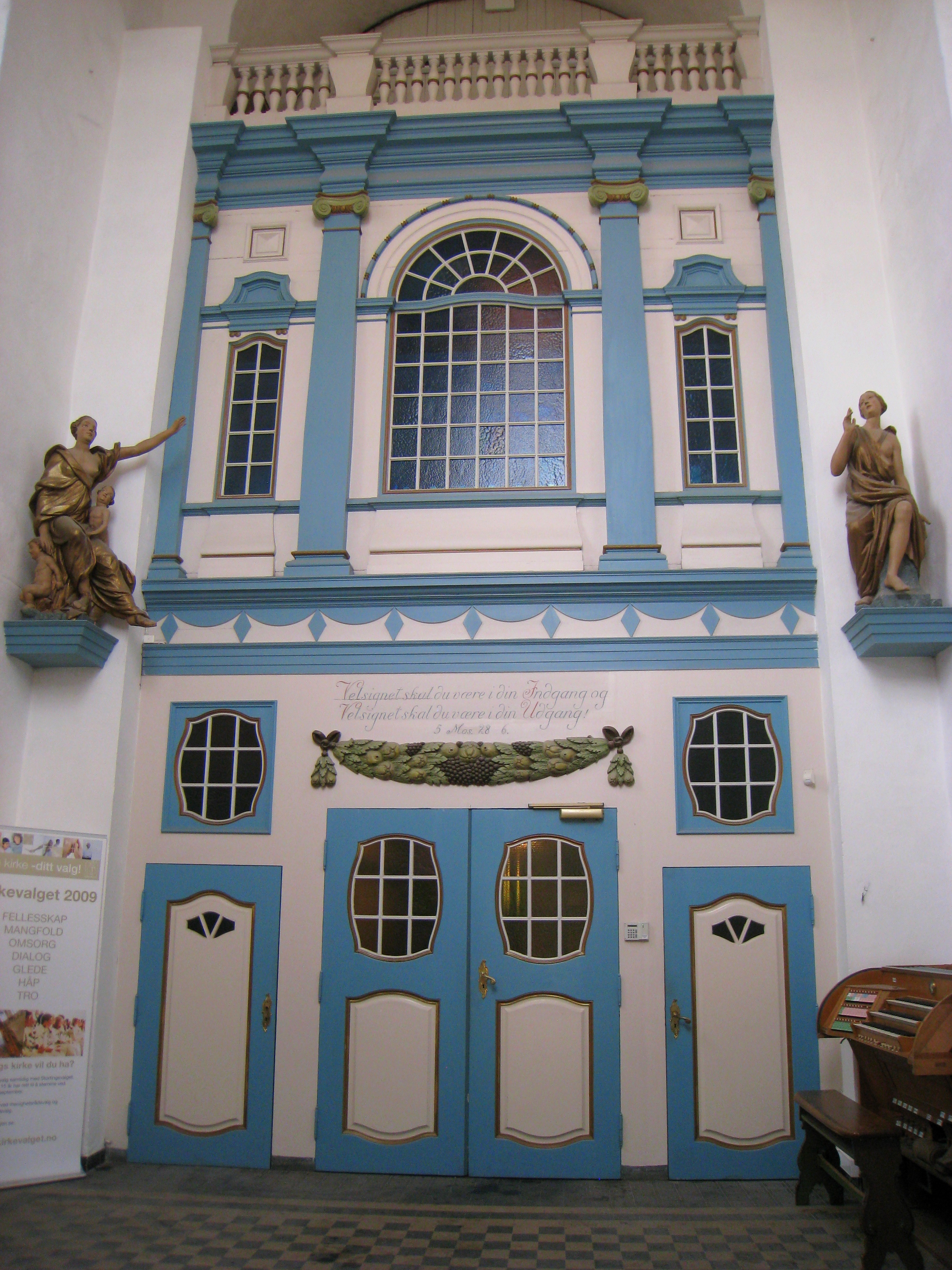
Roccoco wall

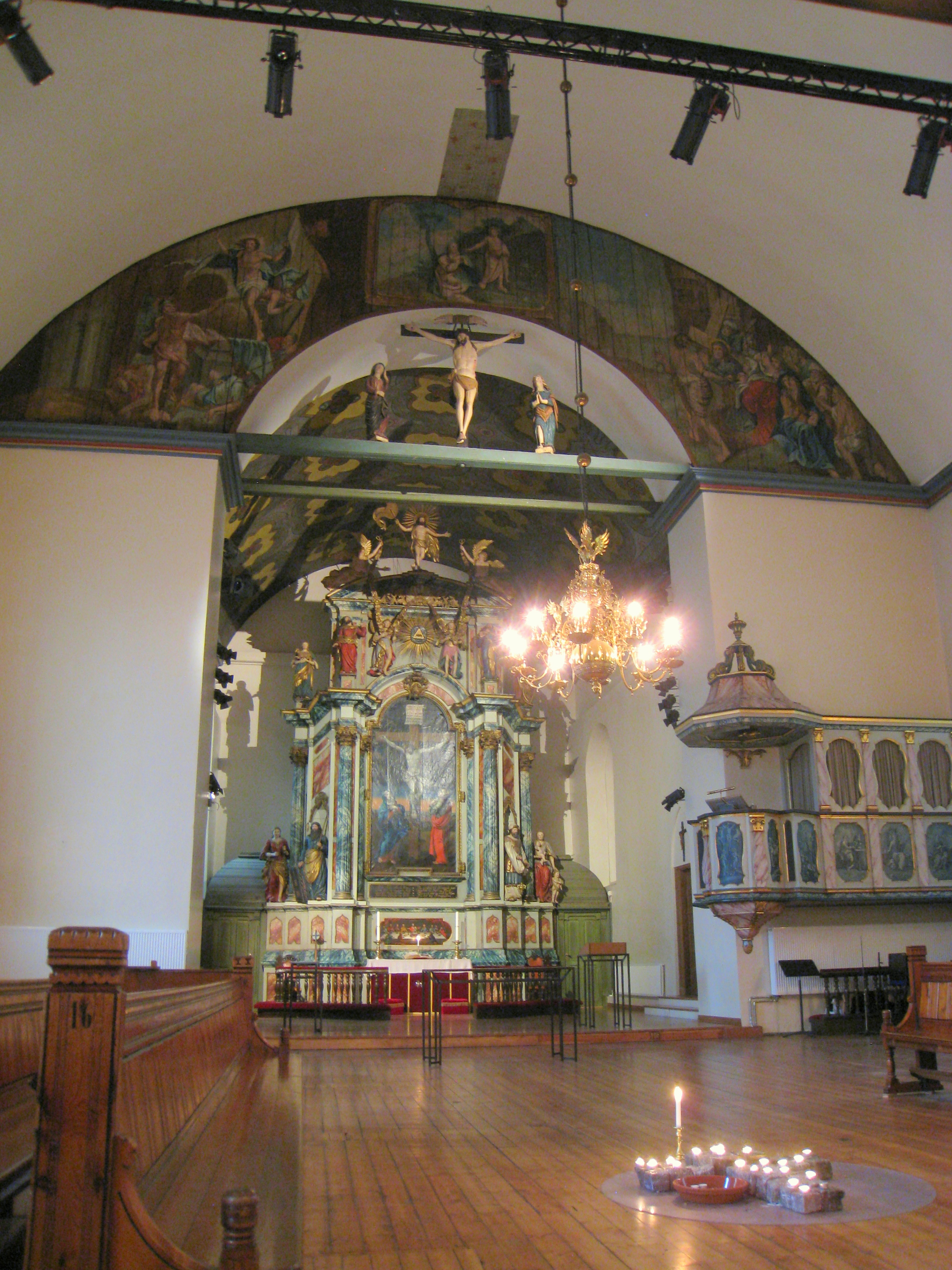
Front of the church

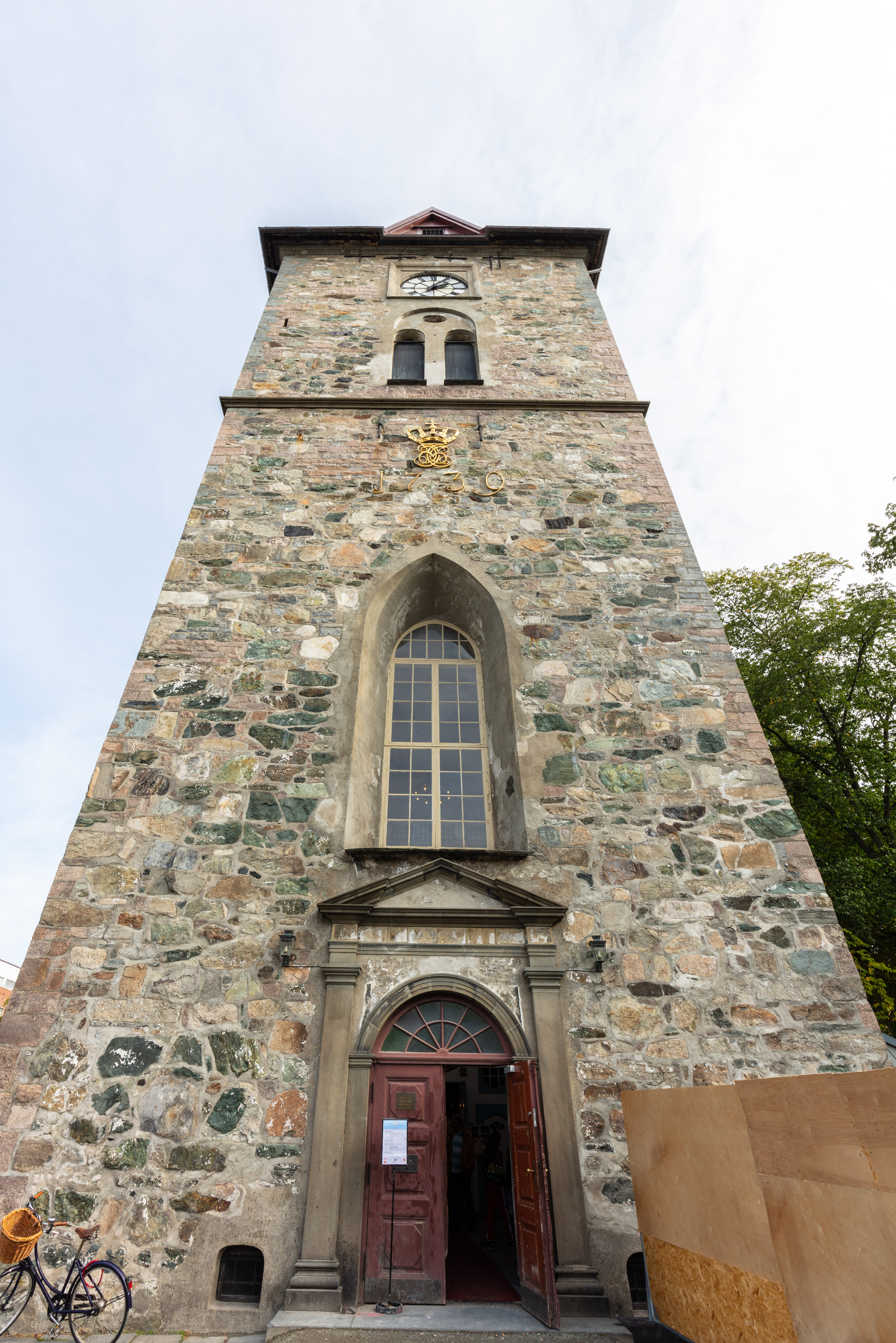
Bell tower

== See also ==
- List of churches in Nidaros
