= Klever =

Klever may refer to:

== People ==
- Kléver Chalá, a retired Ecuadorian football midfielder
- Klever Loureiro, a Brazilian judge and the president of the Court of Justice of Alagoas
- Kléver Rodrigo Gomes Rufino, a Brazilian footballer often known solely by his first name Kléver
- DJ Klever, an American turntablist and two-time US Disco Mix Club champion
- Julius von Klever, a Baltic German landscape painter
- Reinette Klever, a Dutch politician and former asset manager
- Rocky Klever, a former American football tight end in the National Football League
- Valery Klever, a Russian painter
- Wim Klever, a Dutch scholar

== Places ==
- Klever, Norway, a village in Holmestrand Municipality in Vestfold county, Norway
- Klever Reichswald, a forest between the rivers Rhine and Meuse in North Rhine-Westphalia, Germany

== Other ==
- Klever (game), a Russian app and trivia game
