= Valery Klever =

Russian painter

Valery Klever is Russian artist. He was born in the U.S.S.R. He was an active participant in the Non-Conformist movement from 1965-1978.

== Career ==
He was involved in the Bulldozer Exhibition on September 15, 1974. His work appeared in the Gasonevski Exhibition in Leningrad in 1975; and many other showings. Due to political pressure, Klever had to show his paintings in underground art galleries and home exhibitions. The 300 paintings he made as part of his “Freedom Search” series gained popularity due to their anti-government sentiment and biblical themes; which gave Klever notoriety with the KGB. For 4 years, Klever and his family faced heavy persecution.

In 1932 Joseph Stalin mandated that all art in the Soviet Union must be Socialist Realist, all other manners of art such as Impressionism or Surrealism were forbidden. Artists and writers who violated the mandate were often beaten by the secret police, imprisoned, or banished to the Gulag. Klever's artwork was reactionary (i.e., socio-political in nature), a pictorial chronology of events that unfolded in the Soviet Union throughout the 1960s' and 70s'. Although Klever's father was a ranking officer and test pilot in the Red Army he was under constant surveillance and harassment by the KGB. He lost his Soviet citizenship in 1978 and moved to America by way of Austria, Germany, and France. He continued to work and exhibit his paintings in all the aforementioned countries.

He died from testicular cancer in Thousand Oaks, CA on June 29, 2013.
