= Jens Harald Bratlie =

Norwegian pianist (born 1948)

Jens Harald Bratlie (born 22 November 1948) is a Norwegian pianist. He has studied in Oslo, Paris and London, and made his debut at the age of 17 in Oslo in 1965. Bratlie won first prize at the Conservatoire de Paris in 1967, The Rieflingprice in 1969, and the Norwegian Musikkritikerpris in 1974.

He is now a professor at the Norwegian Academy of Music.

Bratlie has given many concerts in Scandinavia, Germany, Belgium, Russia, China and United States.
