= Bjørn Moe =

Norwegian conductor (born 1945)

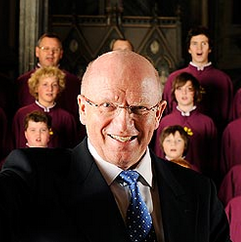
Bjørn Moe

Bjørn Moe (born 19 March 1945) is a Norwegian conductor. He worked as an associate professor at the Department for Music at the Norwegian University of Science and Technology and was the conductor of the Nidaros Cathedral Boys' Choir from 1973 until he retired in 2023. He started as a boy soprano in the choir at the age of 8, and has later sung both tenor and bass. In 2002 Bjørn Moe was awarded HM The King's Medal of Merit in gold for his work with the choir.
