= Hver gang vi møtes =

Norwegian reality television show

- Country of origin: Norway
- Original language: Norwegian
- No. of seasons: 13
- No. of episodes: 104

Production
- Production location: Norway

Original release
- Network: TV 2
- Release: 2012 – present

Hver gang vi møtes (meaning Every Time We Meet in Norwegian) is a Norwegian reality television show broadcast on the Norwegian TV 2 television station in 2012. It is structured in similar format to the Swedish series Så mycket bättre that had been launched in 2010.

== Season 1 (2012) ==
The first series included 7 artists that would sing each other's song, with each of the first 7 episodes dedicated to songs by one of the participants. In an 8-episode series, in the first seven episodes, the participants would sing songs pertaining to one specific participant. The 8th, final, episode would be a wrap-up with duos by participants. The music would be released in an album. Every time we meet at the record label EMI after the suite is fully shown. The title of the series comes from a line in Halvdan Sivertsen song "Venner" (meaning friends).

The most successful interpretation in the series was Vinni singing "Sommerfuggel i vinterland" a famous song by Halvdan Sivertsen after 25 years of the original. The song topped the VG lista, the official Norwegian Singles Chart for 5 consecutive weeks. Vinni's other interpretation, "God morgen Norge" a song from Øystein Dolmen also topped the Singles Chart for another 2 weeks immediately after Sommerfuggel i vinterland, a 7-week run on top of the charts for Vinni.

The album Hver gang vi møtes containing materials from the program topped the Norwegian Albums Chart for 2 weeks in March 2012.

The program won two awards during Gullruten 2012 for "Best Entertainment Show" and "best New Show". The program has been renewed for a new second season in 2013.

=== Songs ===
==== Show 1 – Halvdan Sivertsen ====
- Anne Grete Preus – "Kjærlighetsvisa"
- Øystein Dolmen – "Ti tusen tommeltotta"
- Jan Eggum – "Nordaførr vårvisa"
- Bertine Zetlitz – "Høre tell på jorda"
- Elvira Nikolaisen – "Bli med mæ dit"
- Øyvind "Vinni" Sauvik – "Sommerfuggel i vinterland"

==== Show 2 – Bertine Zetlitz ====
- Halvdan Sivertsen – "Twisted Little Star"
- Øyvind "Vinni" Sauvik – "Apples & Diamonds"
- Jan Eggum – "Fake Your Beauty"
- Elvira Nikolaisen – "Girl Like You"
- Øystein Dolmen – "Adore Me"
- Anne Grete Preus – "Fate"

==== Show 3 – Jan Eggum ====
- Øyvind "Vinni" Sauvik – "Kor é alle helter hen?"
- Anne Grete Preus – "Ryktet forteller"
- Øystein Dolmen – "Heksedans"
- Elvira Nikolaisen – "En natt forbi"
- Halvdan Sivertsen – "Ta meg med"
- Bertine Zetlitz – "Telefon"

==== Show 4 – Anne Grete Preus ====
- Øyvind "Vinni" Sauvik – "Millimeter"
- Øystein Dolmen – "Gi meg en sjanse til"
- Jan Eggum – "Besøk"
- Halvdan Sivertsen – "Månens elev"
- Bertine Zetlitz – "Sommerfuglvinger"
- Elvira Nikolaisen – "Fryd"

==== Show 5 – Øyvind "Vinni" Sauvik ====
- Elvira Nikolaisen – "Barcelona"
- Jan Eggum – "Tomorrow"
- Bertine Zetlitz – "Change My Star"
- Øystein Dolmen – "Let the Monkey Out"
- Anne Grete Preus – "Medisin"
- Halvdan Sivertsen – "Lonesome Traveller"

==== Show 6 – Elvira Nikolaisen ====
- Halvdan Sivertsen – "Love I Can't Defend"
- Bertine Zetlitz – "Quiet Exit"
- Jan Eggum – "He Loves Me"
- Øyvind "Vinni" Sauvik – "Nothing to Loose"
- Anne Grete Preus – "Egypt Song"
- Øystein Dolmen – "Nærmere deg, min Gud"

==== Show 7 – Øystein Dolmen ====
- Halvdan Sivertsen – "Matpakkevisa"
- Jan Eggum – "Eg ve te Bergen"
- Elvira Nikolaisen – "Grevling i taket"
- Anne Grete Preus – "Kanskje kommer kongen"
- Bertine Zetlitz – "Ku i tunnelen"
- Øyvind "Vinni" Sauvik – "God morgen Norge"

==== Show 8 – Duets ====
This 8th show is not a duet episode yet, even though there are two duets heralding the future duet episodes in the next seasons.

- Elvira Nikolaisen – «Rendezvous»
- Øystein Dolmen og Øyvind «Vinni» Sauvik – «Hallo Hallo»
- Jan Eggum og Elvira Nikolaisen – «Mor, jeg vil tilbake»
- Bertine Zetlitz – «Fake Your Beauty»
- Øyvind «Vinni» Sauvik – «Lonesome Traveller»
- Anne Grete Preus – «Jeg er en by»

=== Album ===
Hver gang vi møtes is a 2012 album of 24 songs taken from the series. It peaked on the VG-lista official Norwegian Albums Chart for two consecutive weeks (charts 12/2013 and 13/2013 in March 2013).

Track list

1. Halvdan Sivertsen: "Lonesome Traveller" (in Norwegian), (Paperboys)
2. Anne Grete Preus: "Kanskje kommer kongen" (Knutsen & Ludvigsen)
3. Øyvind "Vinni" Sauvik: "Sommerfuggel i vinterland" (Halvdan Sivertsen)
4. Jan Eggum: "Nordaførr vårvise" (Halvdan Sivertsen)
5. Bertine Zetlitz: "Sommerfuglvinger" (Anne Grete Preus)
6. Halvdan Sivertsen: "Twisted Little Star" (in Norwegian), (Bertine Zetlitz)
7. Øystein Dolmen: "Let the Monkey Out" (Vinni)
8. Elvira Nikolaisen: "En natt forbi" (Jan Eggum)
9. Anne Grete Preus: "Egypt Song" (Elvira Nikolaisen)
10. Øyvind "Vinni" Sauvik: "God morgen Norge" (Knutsen & Ludvigsen)
11. Jan Eggum: "Eg ve te Bergen" (Knutsen & Ludvigsen)
12. Elvira Nikolaisen: "Barcelona" (Paperboys/Madcon)
13. Bertine Zetlitz: "Change My Stars" (Paperboys)
14. Øystein Dolmen & Vinni: "Hallo Hallo" (Knutsen & Ludvigsen)
15. Halvdan Sivertsen: "Månens elev" (Anne Grete Preus)
16. Anne Grete Preus: "Ryktet forteller" (Jan Eggum)
17. Jan Eggum: "He Loves Me" (Elvira Nikolaisen)
18. Elvira Nikolaisen: "Girl Like You" (Bertine Zetlitz)
19. Øyvind "Vinni" Sauvik: "Kor e alle helter hen" (Jan Eggum)
20. Halvdan Sivertsen: "Love I Can't Defend" (in Norwegian), (Elvira Nikolaisen)
21. Øystein Dolmen: "10 000 tommeltotta" (Halvdan Sivertsen)
22. Jan Eggum: "Besøk" (Anne Grete Preus)
23. Øystein Dolmen: "Adore Me" (Bertine Zetlitz)
24. Bertine Zetlitz: "Telefon" (Jan Eggum)

=== Gallery ===
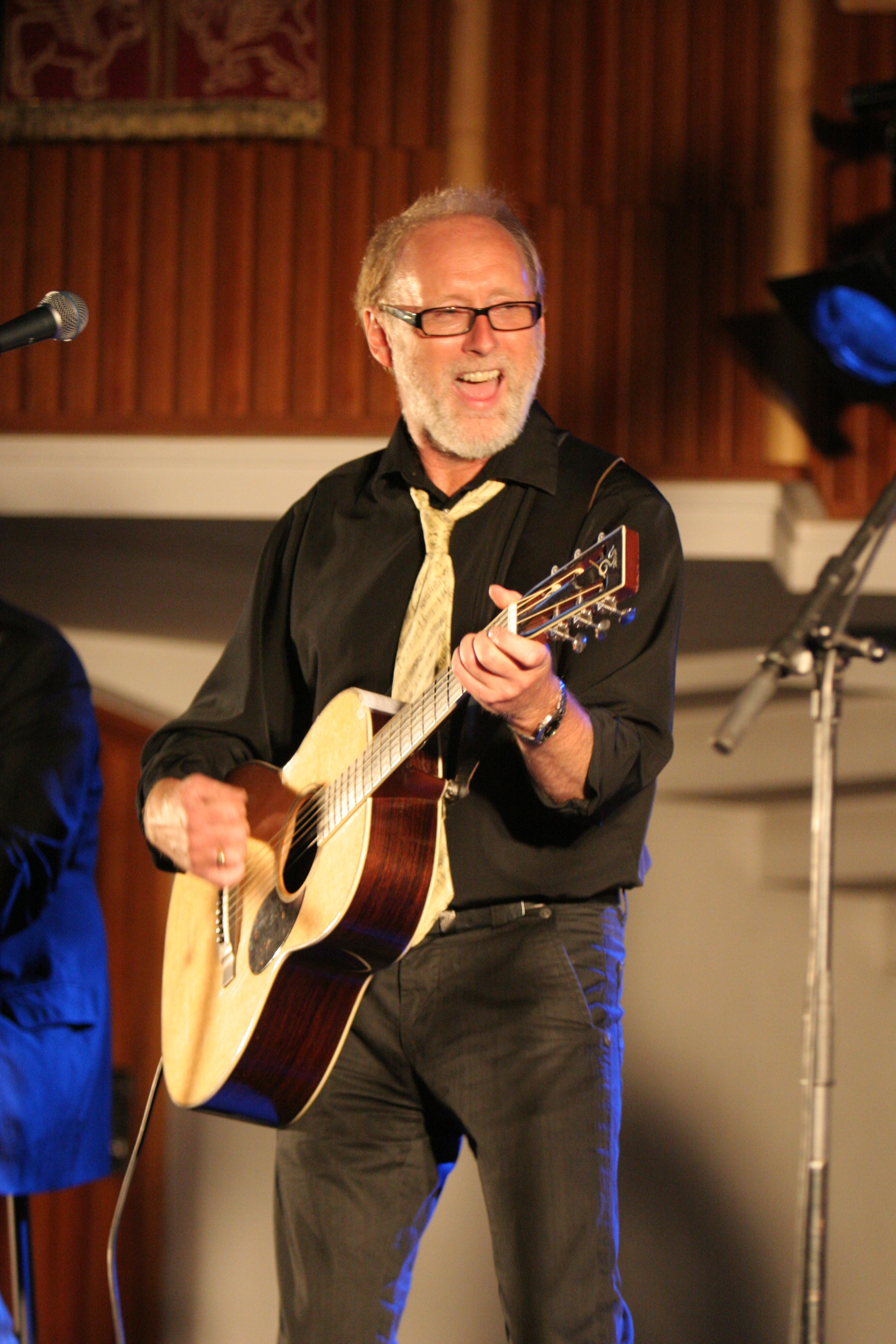
Halvdan Sivertsen, featured artist, episode 1

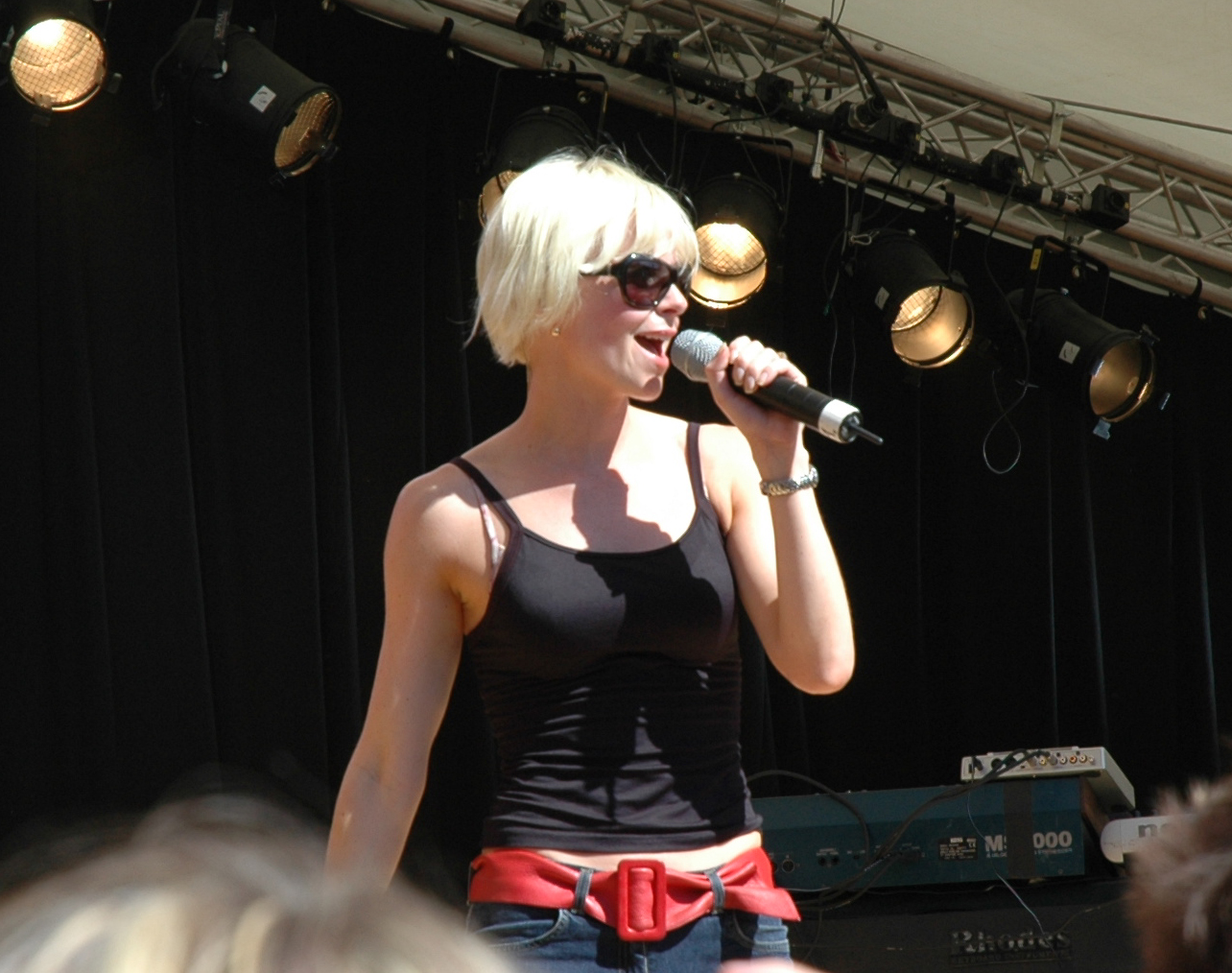
Bertine Zetlitz, featured artist, episode 2

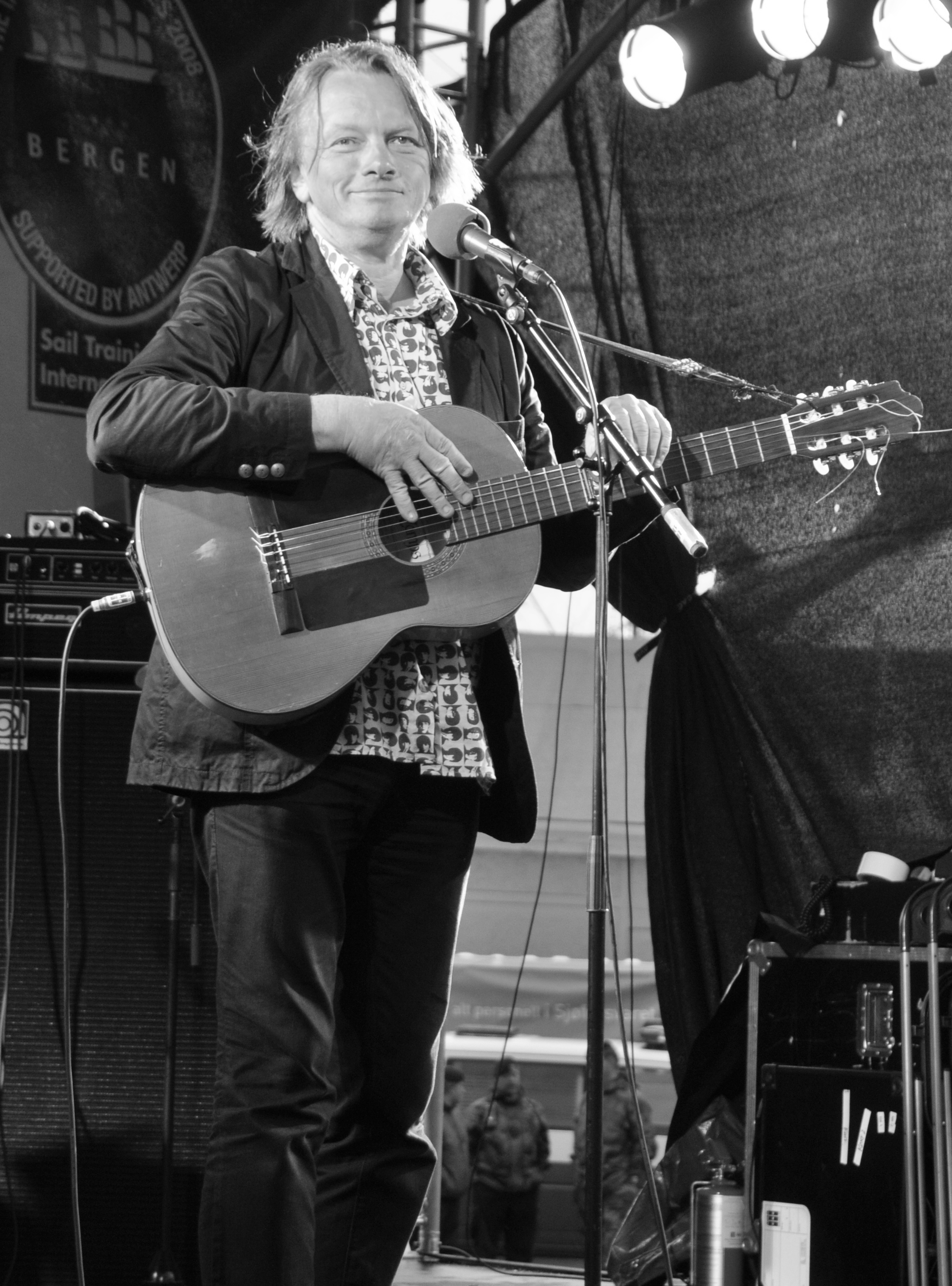
Jan Eggum, featured artist, episode 3

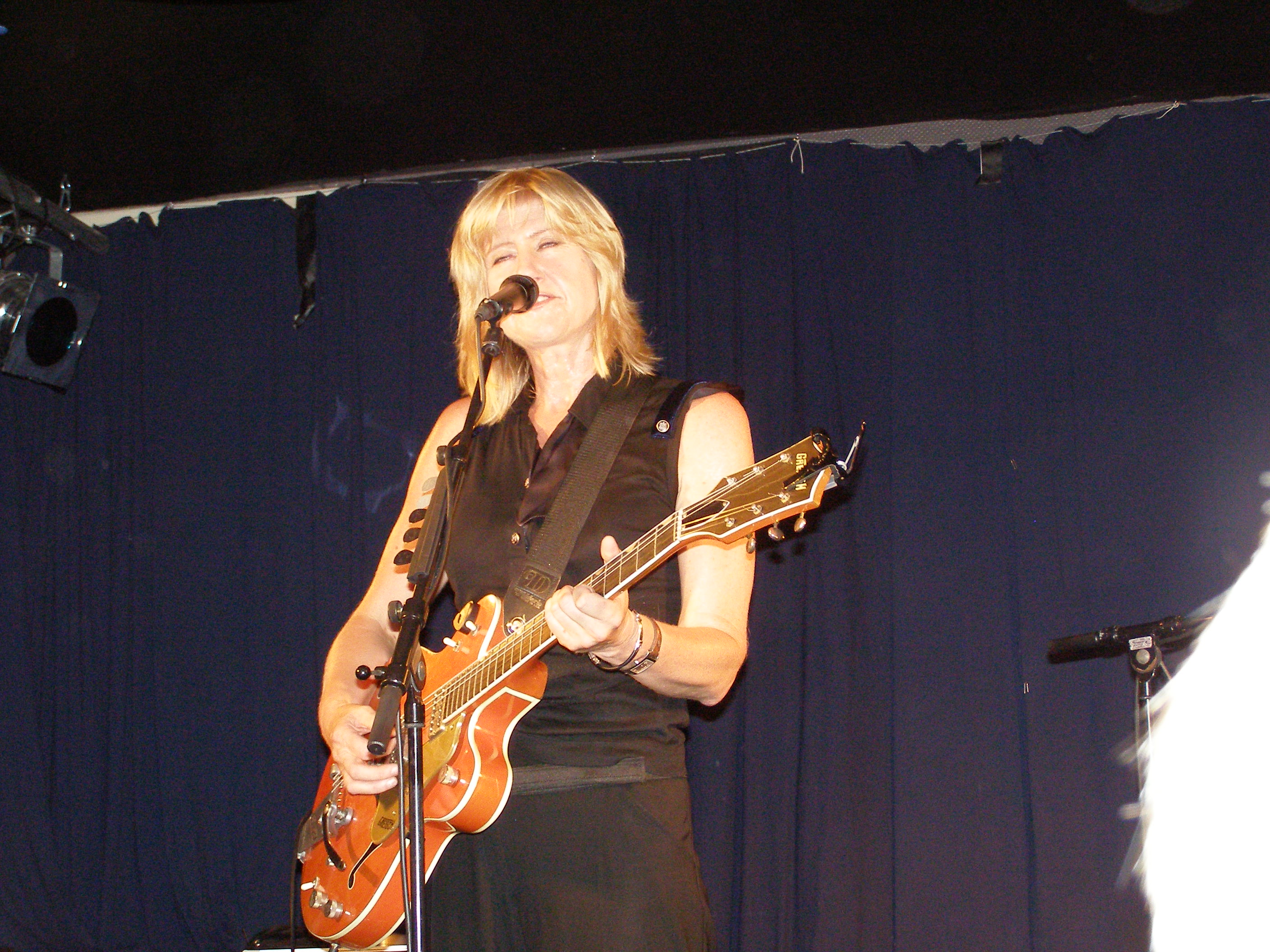
Anne Grete Preus, featured artist, episode 4

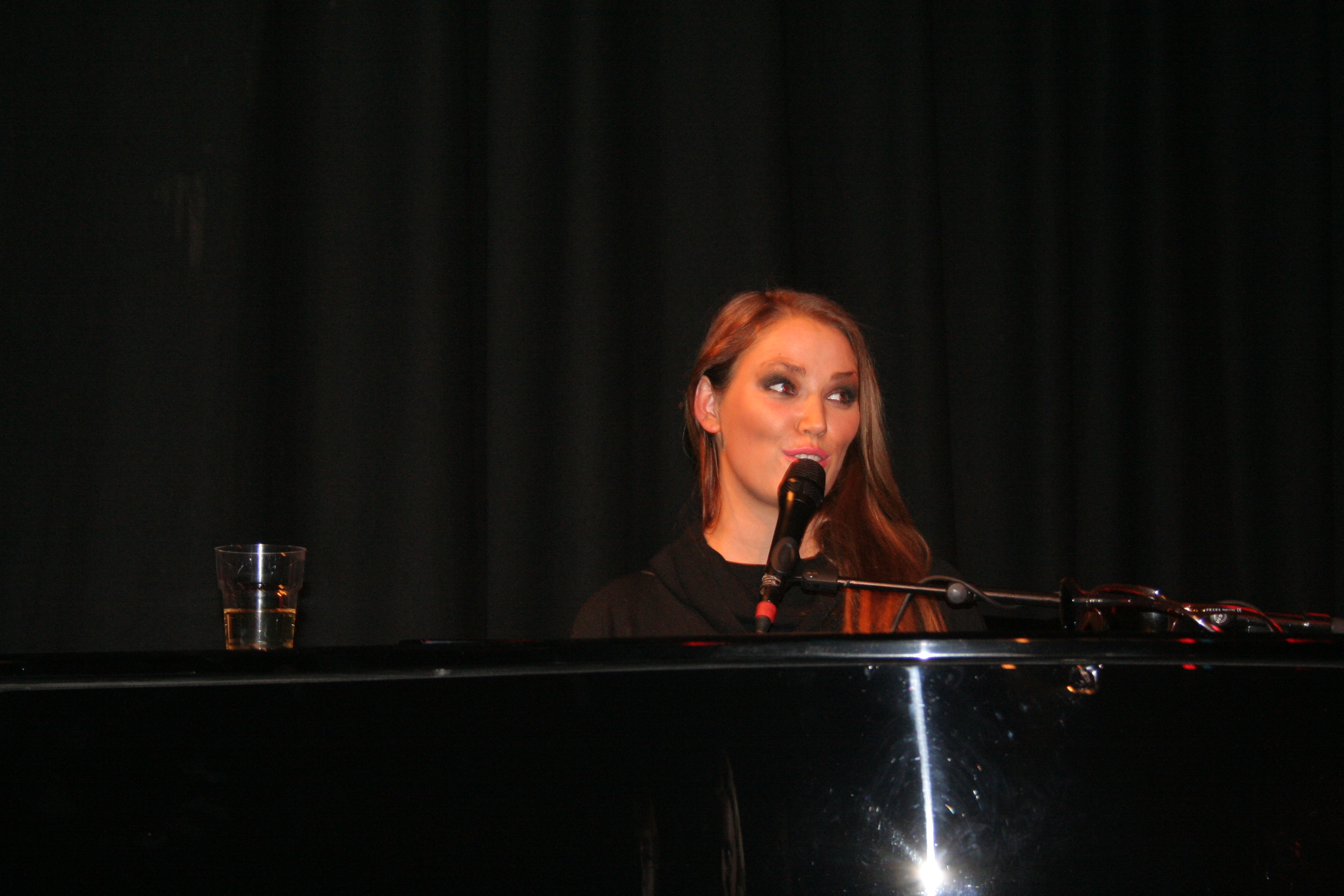
Elvira Nikolaisen, featured artist, episode 6

== Season 2 (2013) ==
Based on the huge success of the show, was renewed on Norwegian TV 2 for a second season. The invitees for the second season were Morten Abel, Marion Raven (or in Norwegian Ravn), Ole Paus, Anita Skorgan, Magnus Grønneberg, Kurt Nilsen and Lene Marlin.

=== Songs ===
==== Show 1 – Anita Skorgan ====
- Marion Ravn – "Casanova"
- Morten Abel – "Oliver"
- Ole Paus – "For vår jord"
- Lene Marlin – "Is It True"
- Magnus Grønneberg – "Hvor er du nå"
- Kurt Nilsen – "Adieu"

==== Show 2 – Morten Abel ====
- Anita Skorgan – "I'll Come Back and Love you Forever"
- Magnus Grønneberg – "Tore tang"
- Lene Marlin – "Don't Forget Me"
- Marion Ravn – "Bullet Me"
- Kurt Nilsen – "Hard to Stay Awake"
- Ole Paus – "Lydia"

==== Show 3 – Lene Marlin ====
- Marion Ravn – "Unforgivable Sinner"
- Kurt Nilsen – "You Weren't There"
- Anita Skorgan – "Here We Are"
- Morten Abel – "Do you Remember"
- Ole Paus – "Masken" ("Disguise")
- Magnus Grønneberg – "Nå sitter jeg her" ("Sitting Down Here")

==== Show 4 – Kurt Nilsen ====
- Lene Marlin – "Rise to the Occasion"
- Magnus Grønneberg – "My Street" ("Mitt strøk")
- Anita Skorgan – "Singing the Song"
- Morten Abel – "Reality Kicks In"
- Marion Ravn – "Never Easy"
- Ole Paus – "Du sa"

==== Show 5 – Magnus Grønneberg ====
- Ole Paus – "Harry"
- Marion Ravn – "Når du sover"
- Kurt Nilsen – "Kom igjen"
- Morten Abel – "Tigergutt"
- Anita Skorgan – "To hjerter og en sjel"
- Lene Marlin – "Kanskje du behøver noen"

==== Show 6 – Marion Raven ====
- Kurt Nilsen – "Everything"
- Morten Abel – "Girl in Your Dreams"
- Magnus Grønneberg – "Her står jeg" ("Here I Am")
- Ole Paus – "Gi meg litt tid" ("Don't Say You Love Me")
- Anita Skorgan – "For You, I'll Die"
- Lene Marlin – "Har dæ litt" ("Found Someone")

==== Show 7 – Ole Paus ====
- Kurt Nilsen – "Nå kommer jeg og tar deg"
- Lene Marlin – "Jeg reiser alene"
- Morten Abel – "Alt var mye bedre under krigen"
- Marion Ravn – "Nerven i min sang"
- Anita Skorgan – "Det begynner å bli et liv"
- Magnus Grønneberg – "Sett deg ned"

==== Show 8 – The duets ====
- Kurt Nilsen & Anita Skorgan – "Friendly"
- Marion Ravn & Lene Marlin – "Where I'm Headed"
- Ole Paus & Magnus Grønneberg – "Hodet over vannet"
- Marion Ravn & Magnus Grønneberg – "Syndere i sommersol"
- Morten Abel & Anita Skorgan – "She's So High"
- Kurt Nilsen & Lene Marlin – "Engler i sneen"
- Ole Paus & Morten Abel – "Tulipz"

=== Album ===
Hver gang vi møtes – Sesong 2 is a 2013 album of 25 songs taken from the series. The release topped the VG-lista Norwegian Albums Chart. (chart 7/2013 in February 2013)

Track list

1. Morten Abel – "Tigergutt" (Magnus Grønneberg)
2. Magnus Grønneberg – "My Street"/"Mitt strøk" (Kurt Nilsen)
3. Kurt Nilsen – "Adieu" (Anita Skorgan)
4. Anita Skorgan – "I'll Come Back and Love You Forever" (Morten Abel)
5. Lene Marlin – "Rise to the Occasion" (Kurt Nilsen)
6. Marion Ravn – "Unforgiveable Sinner" (Lene Marlin)
7. Ole Paus – "Lydia" (Morten Abel)
8. Lene Marlin & Kurt Nilsen – "Engler i snøen"
9. Morten Abel – "Reality Kicks In" (Kurt Nilsen)
10. Marion Ravn – "Casanova" (Anita Skorgan)
11. Kurt Nilsen – "Everything" (Marion Ravn)
12. Magnus Grønneberg – "Tore Tang" (Morten Abel)
13. Lene Marlin – "Don't Forget Me" (Morten Abel)
14. Anita Skorgan & Kurt Nilsen – "Friendly"
15. Ole Paus – "For vår jord" (Anita Skorgan)
16. Morten Abel – "Do You Remember" (Lene Marlin)
17. Kurt Nilsen – "Hard to Stay Awake" (Morten Abel)
18. Anita Skorgan – "Det begynner å bli et liv" (Ole Paus)
19. Marion Ravn – "Nerven i min sang" (Ole Paus)
20. Magnus Grønneberg – "Here I Am"/"Her står jeg" (Marion Ravn)
21. Morten Abel – "Girl in Your Dreams" (Marion Raven)
22. Ole Paus – "Disguise"/"Masken" (Lene Marlin)
23. Marion Ravn & Magnus Grønneberg – "Syndere i sommersol"
24. Kurt Nilsen – "Nå kommer jeg og tar deg" (Ole Paus)
25. Lene Marlin – "Jeg reiser alene" (Ole Paus)

=== Gallery ===
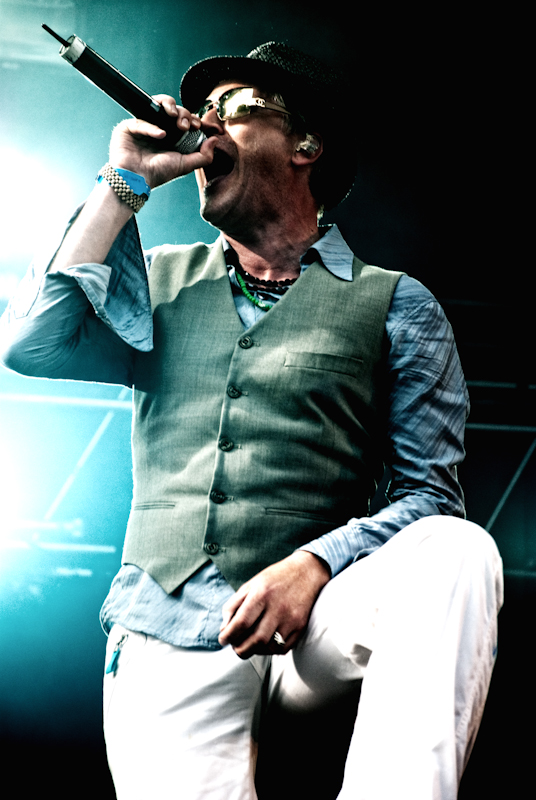
Morten Abel, featured artist, episode 2

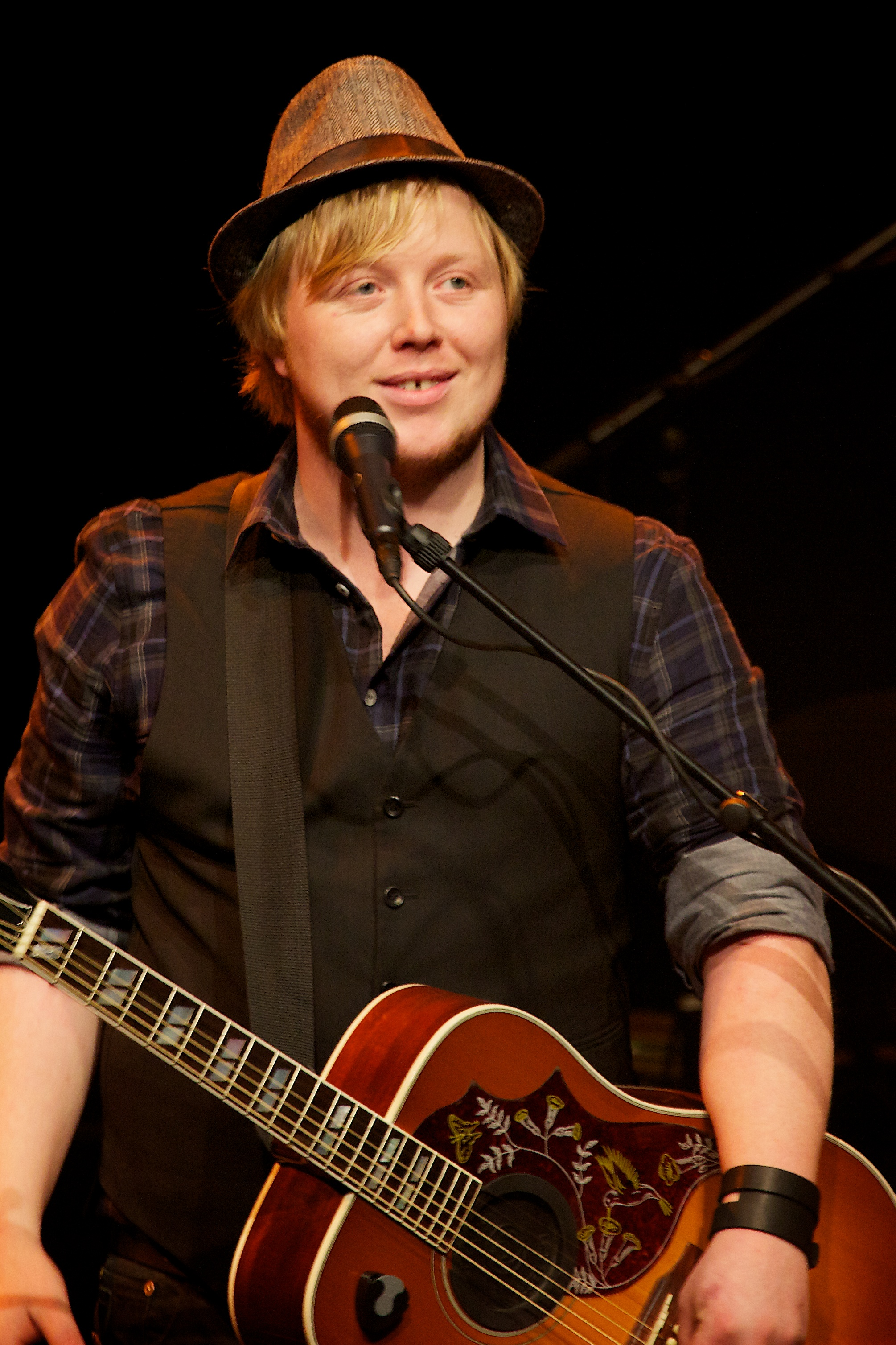
Kurt Nilsen, featured artist, episode 4

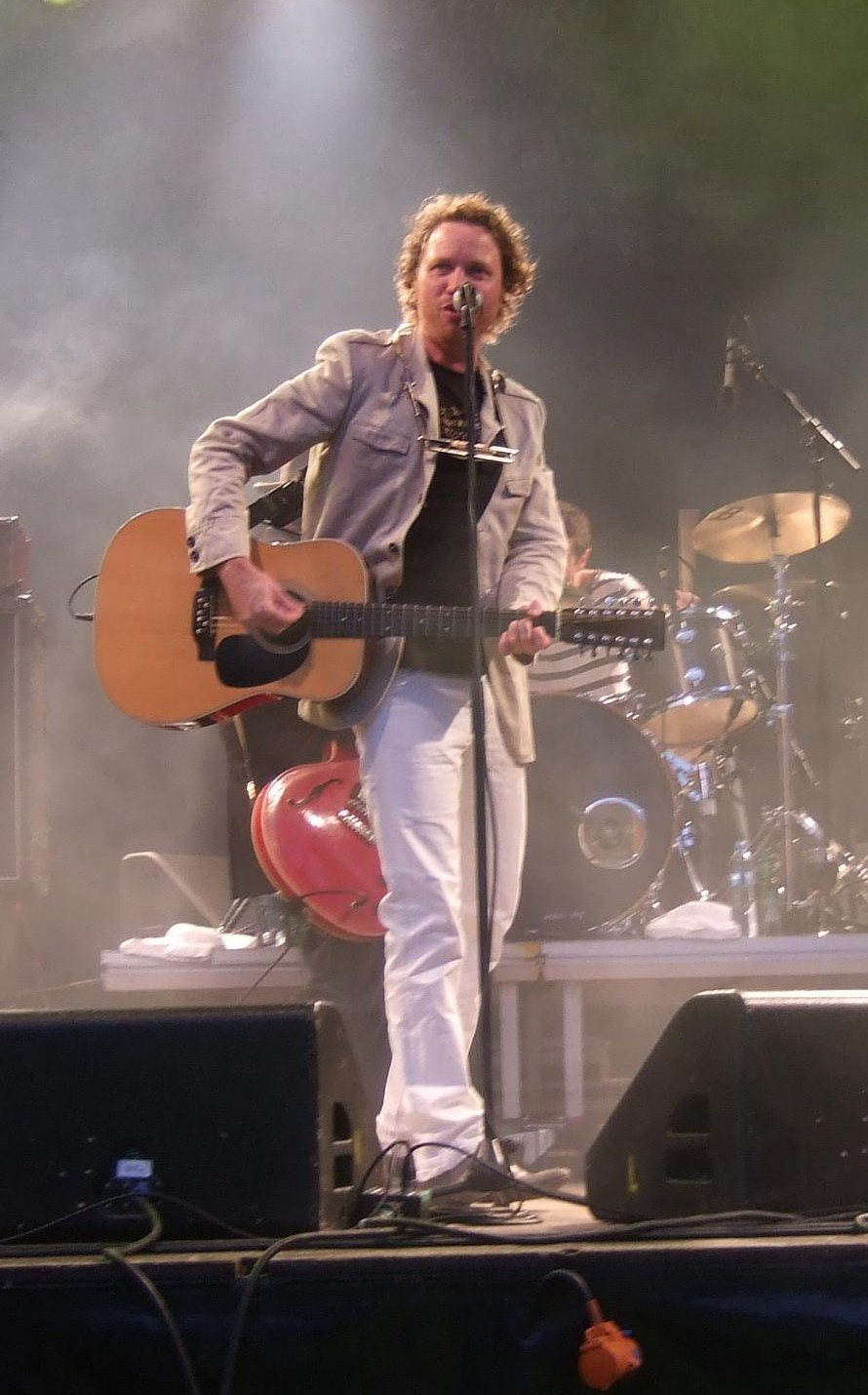
Magnus Grønneberg, featured artist, episode 5

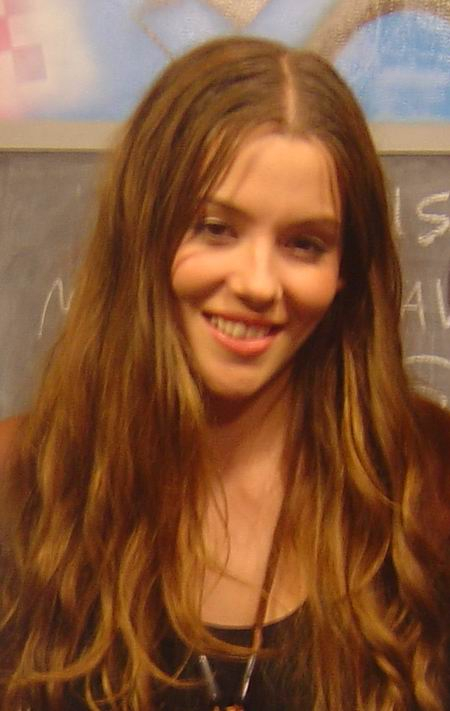
Marion Ravn, featured artist, episode 6

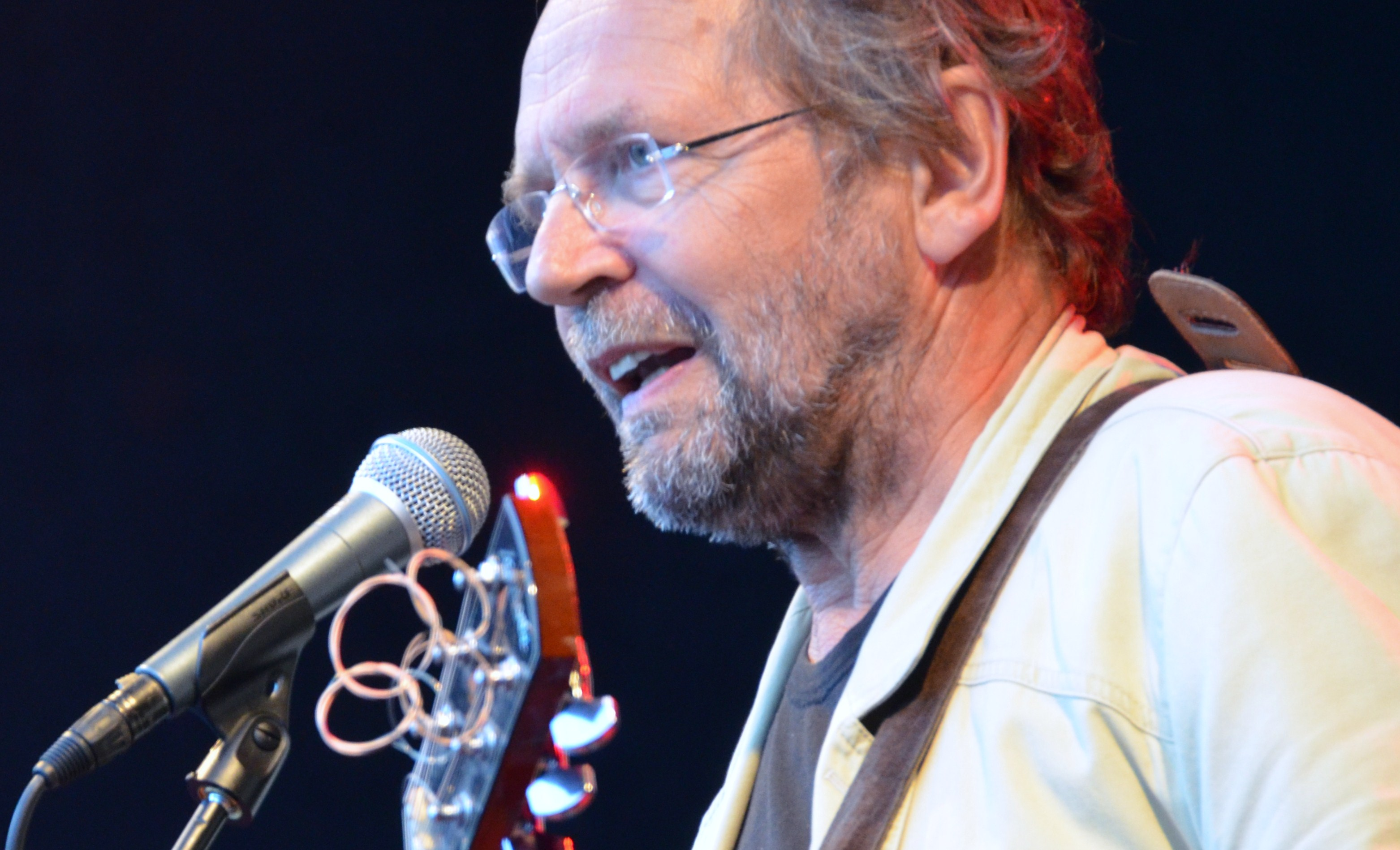
Ole Paus, featured artist, episode 7

== Season 3 (2014) ==
Based on the huge success of the show, it was renewed on Norwegian TV 2 for another season. The invitees for the third season were Øivind Elgenes (a.k.a. "Elg"), Simone Eriksrud (a.k.a. Simone Larsen from band d'sound), Sigvart Dagsland, Alexander Rybak, Samsaya, Anneli Drecker and Lars Lillo-Stenberg (from deLillos).

=== Songs ===
==== Show 1 – Øivind Elgenes ====
- Simone Eriksrud – "Dance With a Stranger"
- Sigvart Dagsland – "Everyone Needs a Friend"
- Alexander Rybak – "Lucky One"
- Samsaya – "Morning Sun" ("Morrasola")
- Anneli Drecker – "Lang desembernatt" ("Long December Night")
- Lars Lillo-Stenberg – "Din usynlige mann" (2. "The Invisible Man")

==== Show 2 – Anneli Drecker ====
- Sigvart Dagsland – "Shimmering Warm and Bright"
- Lars Lillo Stenberg – "Rykter" ("Rumour")
- Øyvind Elgenes – "Sparks"
- Simone Eriksrud – "You Don't Have to Change"
- Samsaya – "Images"
- Alexander Rybak – "Strange Little Bird"

==== Show 3 – Alexander Rybak ====
- Samsaya – "Europe Skies"
- Sigvart Dagsland – "13 Hester" (13 Horses)
- Anneli Drecker – "5000 Letters"
- Simone Eriksrud – "Funny Little World"
- Lars Lillo Stenberg – "Eventyr" ("Fairytale")
- Øyvind Elgenes – "OAH"

==== Show 4 – Simone Eriksrud ====
- Anneli Drecker – "Real Name"
- Alexander Rybak – "Smooth Escape"
- Lars Lillo Stenberg – "Jeg vil" ("Do I Need a Reason")
- Samsaya – "Tattooed On My Mind"
- Øyvind Elgenes – "Last Days And Nights of Rock And Roll"
- Sigvart Dagsland – "Ambitions"

==== Show 5 – Sigvart Dagsland ====
- Simone Eriksrud – "De Umulige"
- Øyvind Elgenes – "Hjemmefra"
- Samsaya – "Se så lykkelige"
- Lars Lillo Stenberg – "Svik"
- Anneli Drecker – "Alt eg såg"
- Alexander Rybak – "Kan eg gjørr någe med det"

==== Show 6 – Samsaya ====
- Alexander Rybak – "Money Ain't All"
- Simone Eriksrud – "Breaking Bad"
- Lars Lillo Stenberg – "Eplet" ("Apple")
- Øyvind Elgenes – "Superhero"
- Sigvart Dagsland – "Forandring" ("Change")
- Anneli Drecker – "Stereotype"

==== Show 7 – Lars Lillo Stenberg ====
- Samsaya – "Tøff i pysjamas"
- Sigvart Dagsland – "Min beibi dro av sted"
- Anneli Drecker – "Glemte minner"
- Alexander Rybak – "Ut"
- Simone Eriksrud – "Klokken er mye nå"
- Øyvind Elgenes – "Hjernen er Alene"

==== Show 8 – (Duets) ====
- Øyvind Elgenes and Sigvart Dagsland – "Only Love"
- Samsaya and Anneli Drecker – "Bombay"
- Lars Lillo Stenberg and Øyvind Elgenes – "Kokken tor"
- Simone Eriksrud and Lars Lillo Stenberg – "Naken hud"
- Alexander Rybak and Simone Eriksrud – "All I Wanna Do"
- Anneli Drecker, Sigvart Dagsland and Alexander Rybak – "Hva er du redd for"
- All artists – "Neste sommer"

=== Album ===
Hver gang vi møtes – Sesong 3 is a 2014 album of 25 songs taken from the series. The release entered the VG-lista Norwegian Albums Chart at number 5 (chart 15/2014 in April 2014)

Track list

1. Sigvart Dagsland – "Everyone Needs a Friend" (Øivind "Elg" Elgenes)
2. Alexander Rybak – "Lucky One"
3. Anneli Drecker – "Long December Night" (Øivind "Elg" Elgenes)
4. Lars Lillo-Stenberg – "Rumour"
5. Elg – "Sparks"
6. Simone Eriksrud – "You Don't Have to Change" (Anneli Drecker)
7. Sigvart Dagsland – "13 Horses" (Sigvart Dagsland)
8. Anneli Drecker – "5000 Letters" (Alexander Rybak)
9. Lars Lillo-Stenberg – "Fairytale" (Alexander Rybak)
10. Anneli Drecker – "Real Name"
11. Samsaya – "Tattooed On My Mind" (Simone Eriksrud)
12. Elg – "Last Days of Rock & Roll" (Simone Eriksrud)
13. Simone Eriksrud – "De umulige"
14. Samsaya – "Se så lykkelige" (Sigvart Dagsland)
15. Alexander Rybak – "Kan eg gjørr någe med det?" (Sigvart Dagsland)
16. Alexander Rybak – "Money" (Samsaya)
17. Lars Lillo-Stenberg – "Apple"
18. Sigvart Dagsland – "Change" (Samsaya)
19. Samsaya – "Tøff i pyjamas" (deLillos)
20. Simone Eriksrud – "Klokken er mye nå"
21. Elg – "Hjernen er alene" (Lars Lillo-Stenberg)
22. Sigvart Dagsland & Anneli Drecker – "Ka e du redd for?"
23. Simone Eriksrud & Lars Lillo-Stenberg – "Nagen hud" (Sigvart Dagsland)
24. Sigvart Dagsland, Lars Lillo-Stenberg, Alexander Rybak, Samsaya, Elg, Anneli Drecker & Simone Eriksrud – "Neste sommer" (deLillos)

== Season 4 (2015) ==
Based on the huge success of the show, it was renewed on Norwegian TV 2 for a fourth season. The invitees for the new season were: OnklP, Inger Lise Rypdal, Jonas Fjeld, Bjarne Brøndbo, Lene Nystrøm, Thom Hell and Silje Nergaard.

=== Songs ===
==== Show 1 – Bjarne Brøndbo ====
- Silje Nergaard– "Rai Rai"
- Thom Hell – "Det går likar no"
- Jonas Fjeld – "E6"
- Lene Nystrøm – "Rompa mi"
- OnklP – "Vinsjan på kaia"
- Inger Lyse Rypdal – "Det umulige e mkulig"

==== Show 2 – Lene Nystrøm ====
- Jonas Fjeld – "Doctor Jones"
- Thom Hell – "Cartoon Heroes"
- Silje Nergaard – "Barbie Girl"
- OnklP – "It's Your Duty"
- Bjarne Brøndbo – "Skrik" (Scream)
- Inger Lise Rypdal – "Back to the 80s"

==== Show 3 – Jonas Fjeld ====
- Inger Lise Rypdal – "Drammen i regn"
- Thom Hell – "Hun kom som en engel"
- OnklP – "Engler I snøen" (Engler i sneen)
- Lene Nystrøm – "The Bells Are Ringing For You Now"
- Bjarne Brøndbo – "Bli hos mæ" (Te dagen kjem)
- Silje Nergaard – "Tordensky"

==== Show 4 – OnklP ====
- Bjarne Brøndbo – "Fredag"
- Jonas Fjeld – "Du eller jeg"
- Inger Lise Rypdal – "Glir forbi"
- Thom Hell – "Uten grunn"
- Silje Nergaard – "Panderosa"
- Lene Nystrøm – "Myk landing"

==== Show 5 – Silje Nergaard ====
- OnklP – "Si meg"
- Jonas Fjeld – "Så nært, så glemt"
- Thom Hell – "Keep On Backing Losers"
- Inger Lise Rypdal – "Dreamers at Heart"
- Lene Nystrøm – "Lullaby to Erle"
- Bjarne Brøndbo – "En og en"

==== Show 6 – Thom Hell ====
- Silje Nergaard – "Love Is Easy"
- OnklP – "All Good Things"
- Lene Nystrøm "So You're Leaving"
- Inger Lise Rypdal – "Over You"
- Jonas Fjeld – "Blå"
- Bjarne Brøndbo – "Ta mæ med"

==== Show 7 – Inger Lise Rypdal ====
- Jonas Fjeld – "Romeo & Julie"
- Lene Nystrøm – "I Found My Freedom"
- Silje Nergaard – "Regn"
- OnklP – "Fru Johnsen"
- Bjarne Brøndbo – "I mitt liv"
- Thom Hell – "En spennende dag for Josefine»

=== Album ===
Hver gang vi møtes – Sesong 4 is a 2015 album of 25 songs taken from the series. The release reached number 8 on the VG-lista Norwegian Albums Chart (chart 10/2015 dated 7 March 2015)

== Season 5 (2016) ==
Based on the huge success of the show, it was renewed on Norwegian TV 2 for a fifth season. The invitees for the new season were: Ravi, Eva & the Heartmaker, Unni Wilhelmsen, Admiral P, Henning Kvitnes, Jørn Hoel and Wenche Myhre.

== Season 6 (2017) ==
Based on the huge success of the show, it was renewed on Norwegian TV 2 for a sixth season. The invitees for the new season were: Margaret Berger, Eldar Vågan, Hanne Sørvaag, Benny Borg, Ida Maria, Åse Kleveland and Esben Selvig.

== Season 7 (2018) ==
The invitees for the new season were: Christel Alsos, Silya Nymoen, Tor Endresen, Claudia Scott, Tone Damli Aaberge, Hans Petter Aaserud and Tshawe Baqwa.

== Season 8 (2019) ==
The invitees for the new season were: Trine Rein, Sol Heilo, Lars Bremnes, Maria Haukaas Mittet, Petter Kristiansen, Elisabeth Andreassen and Tom Mathisen.

== Season 9 (2020) ==
The invitees for the new season were: Odd Nordstoga, Aslag Haugen, Linnea Dale, Chris Holsten, Frida Ånnevik, Morgan Sulele and Tuva Syvertsen.

== Season 10 (2020): Jubilee ==
For season 10, in Fall 2020, 29 invitees from previous seasons were reunited as follows: Hans Petter Aaserud, Morten Abel, Admiral P, Christel Alsos, Elisabeth Andreassen, Tshawe Baqwa, Bjarne Brøndbo, Sigvart Dagsland, Jan Eggum, Øivind Elgenes, Jonas Fjeld, Magnus Grønneberg, Sol Heilo, Chris Holsten, Åse Kleveland, Henning Kvitnes, Wenche Myhre, Kurt Nilsen, Odd Nordstoga, Silya Nymoen, OnklP, Marion Ravn, Inger Lise Rypdal, Øyvind Sauvik, Halvdan Sivertsen, Eva Weel Skram, Unni Wilhelmsen, Bertine Zetlitz and Frida Ånnevik. The late participant Anne Grete Preus was commemorated.

== Season 11 (2021) ==
The invitees for the eleventh season were: Arne Hurlen, Hanne Krogh, Hkeem, Maria Mena, Agnete Saba, Trygve Skaug and Staysman.

== Season 12 (2022) ==
The invitees for the twelfth season were: Jarle Bernhoft, Arif, Maj Britt Andersen, Anna of the North, Stig Brenner, Myra, Øystein Greni and TIX.

== Season 13 (2023) ==
The invitees for the thirteenth season were: Bjørn Eidsvåg, Emma Steinbakken, Karoline Krüger, Kristian Kristensen, Ingebjørg Bratland, Freddy Kalas and Isah.

== Season 14 (2024) ==
The fourteenth season of "Hver gang vi møtes" is slated to air on Norwegian TV (both TV 2 Direkte and TV 2 Play) in 2024. For the forthcoming season, the invitees should be: Matoma, Mari Boine, William Kristoffersen (from Ole Ivars), Emilie Hollow, Odin Staveland (from Vamp), Ingrid Helene Håvik (from Highasakite) and Ramón.

== Season 15 (2025) ==
The fifteenth season of "Hver gang vi møtes" will premiere the first day of 2025 on Norwegian TV (both TV 2 Direkte and TV 2 Play). For the forthcoming season, the invitees is: Stein Torleif Bjella, Carola Häggkvist, Thomas Dybdahl, Ina Wroldsen, Kjartan Lauritzen, Astrid S and Jonas Benyoub. Carola is the first non-Norwegian artist to be invited.

== Season 16 (2026) ==
In the sixteenth season of the program we meet Synne Vo, Hagle, Herborg Kråkevik, Musti, Espen Lind, Marit Larsen from M2M, and the twin duo Marcus & Martinus. The program will be on TV 2 Direkte and Tv 2 Play in early 2026.

== See also ==
- The Best Singers (series)
