= Kalvøyafestivalen =

Music festival in Norway

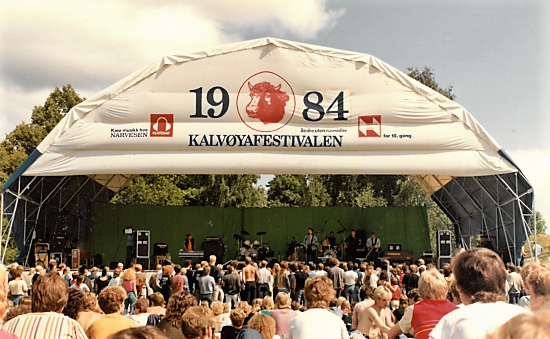
Kalvøyafestivalen 1984. Photo: Bjarte Hetland

Kalvøyafestivalen was a Norwegian music festival arranged at Kalvøya in Bærum nearby Oslo, Norway. The festival was initiated by people connected to the folk club Hades at the art center on Høvikodden. The festival was started by Sten Randers Fredriksen in 1971. The festival was officially closed in 1998.

The breakthrough for the festival was in 1973 when Frank Zappa appeared on stage outside Sandvika. Other major international artists to appear have included Bob Dylan, Iggy Pop, Peter Gabriel, Carlos Santana, Eric Clapton, Van Morrison, Leonard Cohen, Bob Geldof, Rage Against the Machine, U2 (1983), Nirvana (1992), Neil Young, Chicago, Bad Religion, Pearl Jam (1993), Jackson Browne, Violent Femmes, David Bowie (1997), Steeleye Span, The Ramones, Soundgarden, and Faith No More.

Nirvana joined up with the relatively unknown Teenage Fanclub at the festival in 1992. Pearl Jam were going to play in 1992, but had to cancel. They appeared the following year at the festival.

== Program ==
- 1971: Happie, Salhuskvintetten, Prucel, Ole Paus, Lillebjørn Nilsen, Jens Bjørneboe. The festival was held on Sunday, September 5.
- 1972 (I): Prudence (with Åge Alexandersen), Savage Rose, Ole Paus, Finn Kalvik. The festival was held in Nadderudhallen Sunday, June 6.
- 1972 (II): Inside Looking Out, Prudence, Family (with the vocalist Roger Chapman) The festival was held on Sunday, August 27.
- 1973: Frank Zappa, Popol Vuh, Ralph McTell, Finn Kalvik, Pugh & Rainrock, and additional recitations by the poet Jens Bjørneboe. The festival was held on Sunday, August 26.
- 1974: Fairport Convention, Hot Chocolate, Prudence, Andreij Nebb. The festival was held on Sunday August 25.
- 1975:Steeleye Span, Baker Gurvitz Army, Flying Norwegians, Terje Rypdal. The festival was held on Sunday, June 22.
- 1976: Dr. Hook and the Medicine Show, Jack The Lad, Åge Aleksandersen, Cornelis Vreeswijk. The festival was held on Sunday, June 20.
- 1977 (I): Folque, Jan Garbarek with Bobo Stenson, Ketil Bjørnstad, Smokie, Magma, Cornelis Vreeswijk. The festival was held on Sunday, June 26.
- 1977 (II): Chicago, Hot Chocolate, Jonas Fjeld Band. The festival was held on Sunday, September 11.
- 1978: Joan Baez, John McLaughlin, Ulf Lundell, Knutsen & Ludvigsen. The festival was held on Sunday, August 27.
- 1979: Van Morrison, Steel Pulse, Jan Eggum, Veslefrikk (band), Young Lords, Tåm Box. The festival was held on Sunday, August 26.
- 1980: Santana, Tom Robinson Band, Nøkken, Ketil Bjørnstad. The festival was held on Sunday, June 29.
- 1981: This year, the concert was cancelled because of damage to grasslands after the 1980 festival.
- 1982: Jackson Browne, Boomtown Rats (med Bob Geldof), Marius Müller, Marie Bergman, Gilles Obermayer, Åge Aleksandersen & Sambandet, Stubborn Creek Jazzband, and additional recitations by the poet Jan Erik Vold. Arild Nyquist was master of ceremonies. The festival was held on Sunday, June 27.
- 1983: U2, Joe Cocker, De Press. The festival was held on Sunday, 21 August.
- 1984: The Alarm, Annabel Lamb, Beranek, Jon Eberson Group. The festival was held on Sunday, July 1.
- 1985: Leonard Cohen, Björn Afzelius & Globetrotters, Nina Hagen, Bjørn Afzelius & Michael Wiehe. The festival was held on Sunday, June 30.
- 1986: Eric Clapton (with Phil Collins on drums), Pål Thowsen Band, Imperiet. The festival was held Thursday, July 3.
- 1987 (I): Iggy Pop, Rickie Lee Jones, Can Can, Henning Kvitnes and Duck Spin. The festival was held on Sunday, June 28.
- 1987 (II): Peter Gabriel, Little Steven. The festival was held on Sunday, August 30.
- 1988: The 1st day: a-ha, Stage Dolls and deLillos. The Second day: Leonard Cohen, The Rainmakers, Eva Dahlgren and The Colors Turned Red. The festival was held on Saturday and Sunday, June, 25-26.
- 1989: Tracy Chapman, Tanita Tikaram, DumDum Boys. The festival was held on Sunday, June 25.
- 1990: Bob Dylan, Jeff Healey Band, Melissa Etheridge, Midnight Oil, The Rainmakers, Mercury Motors, Lenny Kravitz, Jonas Fjeld. The festival was held on Saturday, June 30 and Sunday, July 1.
- 1991: Bob Dylan, Billy Idol, Iggy Pop, Bjelleklang, Deborah Harry, Robert Cray. The festival was held on Friday and Saturday, June 28–29.
- 1992: Nirvana, Bel Canto • The Blues Brothers Band • Bryan Adams • Crowded House • Extreme • Little Village • Marius Müller’s Funhouse • Teenage Fanclub • Violent Femmes. Pearl Jam was cancelled and was replaced by The Blues Brothers. The festival was held on Saturday and Sunday, June 27–28.
- 1993: Neil Young with Booker T. & the M.G.'s, Soundgarden, Pearl Jam, Faith No More, NOFX, Slash's Snakepit, DumDum Boys, Rage Against The Machine, Atomic Swing, Delbert McClinton with Rita Eriksen. The festival was held on Saturday and Sunday, June 26–27.
- 1994: Peter Gabriel, Angelique Kidjo. The festival was held Wednesday, June 29.
- 1995: The 1st day: Faith No More, Slash's Snakepit, Clawfinger, Motorpsycho, Conception, Bloom County. The Second day: The Offspring, The Ramones, NOFX, Millencolin, Raga Rockers, CC Cowboys, More Than Less. The festival was organized and Sunday, June 24–25.
- 1996: Moby, Björk, Cardigans, DumDum Boys, Sepultura, Green Cortinas, Rage Against The Machine, Afghan Whigs, Neil Young and Crazy Horse, Bad Religion, Virvelvann, Mazzy Star. The festival was held on 29 and 30 June.
- 1997: David Bowie, Prodigy, Skunk Anansie, Nick Cave and The bad seeds, Unni Wilhelmsen, Cosmo, Bel Canto. The festival was held on Saturday and Sunday, June 28–29.
- 1998: Kalvøya festival to be held on August 15–16, was cancelled when they could not attract sufficient headline artists.

== See also ==
- Øyafestivalen
