= Sommerfuggel i vinterland =

1987 song by Halvdan Sivertsen

Song by Halvdan Sivertsen

from the album Ny og naken
- Released: 1987
- Recorded: 1987
- Songwriter: Halvdan Sivertsen (lyrics/music)

"Sommerfuggel i vinterland" (butterfly in winter land in English) is a famous Norwegian language song written, composed and sung by Norwegian artist Halvdan Sivertsen. A song about tolerance, it was the opening track on the album Ny og naken released in 1987, and later on in his compilation albums Hilsen Halvdan in 1991 and 40+ in 2005.

== Cover versions ==
Gitarkameratene

"Sommerfuggel i vinterland"

Song by Gitarkameratene

from the album Grappa
- Released: 1989
- Recorded: 1989
- Songwriter: Halvdan Sivertsen (lyrics/music)

Sivertsen also recorded the song with the super-group Gitarkameratene, made up of Sivertsen, Øystein Sunde, Jan Eggum and Lillebjørn Nilsen. The song on their debut album Grappa released in 1989.

Vinni version

"Sommerfuggel i vinterland"

Single by Øyvind "Vinni" Sauvik

from the album Hver gang vi møtes
- Released: 27 January 2012 (EP (live)); 3 February 2012 (studio version); 5 March 2012 (album release)
- Length: 2:42 (live version); 2:58 (single / album version)
- Songwriter: Halvdan Sivertsen (lyrics/music)

Øyvind "Vinni" Sauvik singles chronology
"Medisin" (2012)	"Sommerfuggel i vinterland" (2012)	"God morgen Norge" (2012)

Music video
- "Sommerfuggel i vinterland" Live during Hver gang vi møtes on YouTube

Music video
- "Sommerfuggel i vinterland" Studio version on YouTube

During the Norwegian reality show Hver gang vi møtes broadcast on the Norwegian television station TV 2 in 2012, it was sung by Øyvind "Vinni" Sauvik in episode 1 of season 1 of the show dedicated Halvdan Sivertsen songs and made available on an EP on 27 January 2012 and hit #4 based on downloads. It was recorded in a studio setting and made available on 3 February 2012, hitting #1 on VG-lista the same week staying at #1 for 5 consecutive weeks. The song was also included in the compilation album containing 24 tracks from various shows of Hver gang vi møtes including "Sommerfuggel i vinterland". It was released on 5 March 2012, with the album making it to the top of the Norwegian Albums Chart for 2 weeks.
