= Parkenfestivalen =

Music festival in Bodø, Norway

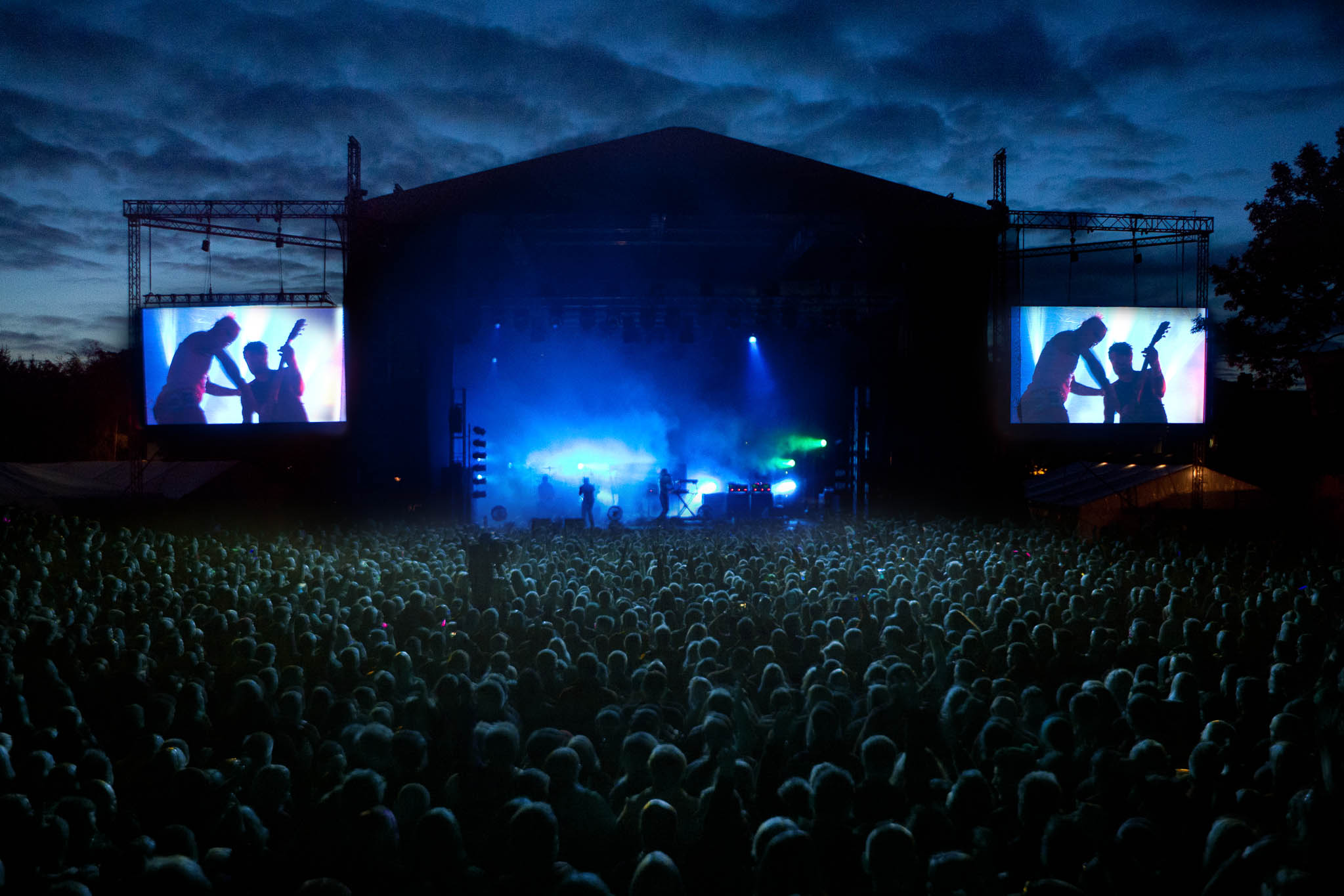
- The Prodigy at Parkenfestivalen 2012.
- Genre: Rock, HipHop, R&B, Rap, Jazz, Blues, Metal
- Dates: Friday and Saturday, third weekend of August.
- Locations: Bodø, Norway
- Years active: 2006-
- Website: http://www.parkenfestivalen.no/

Parkenfestivalen is an outdoors festival that takes place in Bodø, Norway every year in August. This has been a tradition ever since 2006, and the festival only gets bigger every year. The festival is held in a park called Rensåsparken. In the beginning the people organizing the festival only expected about 2500 paying visitors, but already the first year many more came. This year it was sold out about 8 months before it took place. The target group for the festival is mainly young adults and adults.

== About Rensåsparken ==
Rensåsparken is a park close to the center of Bodø. During the year the park is a popular place where people have picnics, take walks and just hang out.

== Stages ==
This festival has several stages, the main stage, the «park-stage» and the «lairo-stage». The main stage is the biggest, and it is where the most known artists would be found. At the «lairo-stage» there would be different DJs, this stage is located at the top of the park, frequented by fewer people. At the «park-stage» local artists often perform, some of these are well known among the citizens of Bodø, whilst other might be performing for the first time.

== Development ==
The parkenfestival started in 2006, and has only gotten bigger since that. The first time the festival had hoped for about 2500 paying guests, but the first day over 5000 showed up, and on the second day 7500. During the years the artists has become more international, compared to the first years when they had a lot of Norwegian and Scandinavian artists.

== Parken Live ==
Parken Livve is all part of the Park festival which holds concerts several times a year . Parken Live has hosted several major concerts with famous artists such as Circus Eliassen, Kaizers Orchestra and Karpe Diem . In 2013, Parken Live arrange concerts with famous artists like Wiz Khalifa, Lissie and Donkeyboy. The concerts are held on several premises like Sinus, Bodø Spektrum and Kulturhuset.

== Media ==
“Parkenavisa” is a newspaper that deals with everything that goes on during the upcoming Festival Park . Here can you find useful information about the various artists and bands, advertisements of sponsors, and interviews with some of the artists . “Parkenavisa” is published as an appendix in the newspaper “Avisa Nordland” around one month before the Park festival starts. In the “parkenavisa” of 2013, you can find a lot of stuff, like interviews, the tradition with drink holders, advertisements from the various sponsor and some information about the various artists and bands.

“Park festival” is a major event that happened in Bodø. The newspapers “Avisa Nordland”and “Bodø Nu” are two of the biggest newspapers that write about everything that happens before, during and after the “Park festival”. They write about artists that are coming, reviews, and other stuff that is related to “Park festival” . The newspaper “Avisa Nordland” is one of the sponsors of the “Park festival”.

== Headliners 2013 ==
- USA 50 Cent
- NOR Halvdan Sivertsen
- AUS Nick Cave and The Bad Seeds
- USA Monster Magnet
- NOR Kvelertak
- USA Woven Hand
- NOR Vamp
- USA Rival Sons
- SWE Graveyard
- NOR Morten Abel
- NOR Christel Alsos

== Headliners 2012 ==
- NOR Jarle Bernhoft
- NOR Hurra Torpedo
- USA The Presidents
- NOR Seigmenn
- SWE Roxette
- SWE Daniel Nordgren
- NOR Hellbillies
- NOR Sirkus Eliassen
- SWE Opeth
- NOR Kaizers Orchestra
- ENG The Prodigy

== Headliners 2011 ==
- UK Lissie
- SWE Robyn
- SWE Håkan Hellström
- NOR Motorpsycho
- NOR Sepultura
- NOR Ida Maria
- NOR Åge & Sambandet
- USA E-40 & Droop-E
- USA The Hooters
- USA Live's Ed Kowalczyk
- USA Iggy & the Stooges

== Headliners 2010 ==
- USA Kelis
- NOR Thomas Dybdahl
- NOR Karpe Diem
- USA Alberta Cross
- NOR DumDum Boys
- UK Buddies
- NOR Joddski
- FRA Gojira
- SWE The Soundtrack of Our Lives
- NOR Sivert Høyem
- UK Suede

== Headliners 2009 ==
- WAL Manic Street Preachers
- USA N.E.R.D.
- SWE The Hives
- USA Grant-Lee Phillips
- NOR Röyksopp
- NOR BigBang
- NOR Noora Noor
- NOR deLillos
- CAN Danko Jones
- NOR Joddski
- NOR Kråkesølv (band)

== Headliners 2008 ==
- NOR Madrugada
- USA The Roots
- UK The Waterboys
- NOR Kaizers Orchestra
- USA Clutch
- NOR Raga Rockers
- UK 1990s
- NOR Superfamily
- NOR Halvdan Sivertsen
- NOR Audrey Horne
- NOR Lukestar

== Headliners 2007 ==
- NOR Odd Nordstoga & Allstars
- NOR 120 Days
- NOR CC Cowboys
- NOR Tungtvann
- NOR Timbuktu & Damn
- USA CunninLynguists
- NOR El Caco
- SWE Bo Kaspers Orkester
- DEN Nephew
- SWE The Ark
- USA Chris Cornell

== Headliners 2006 ==
- NOR Manna
- NOR Tungtvann
- NOR Mira Craig
- SWE The Sounds
- NOR DumDum Boys
- NOR Magnus Eliassen
- NOR Elvira Nikolaisen
- NOR Minor Majority
- SWE Atomic Swing
- DEN Kashmir
- NOR Turboneger
