= Vinni =

Norwegian rapper

Vinni (Øyvind Sauvik)
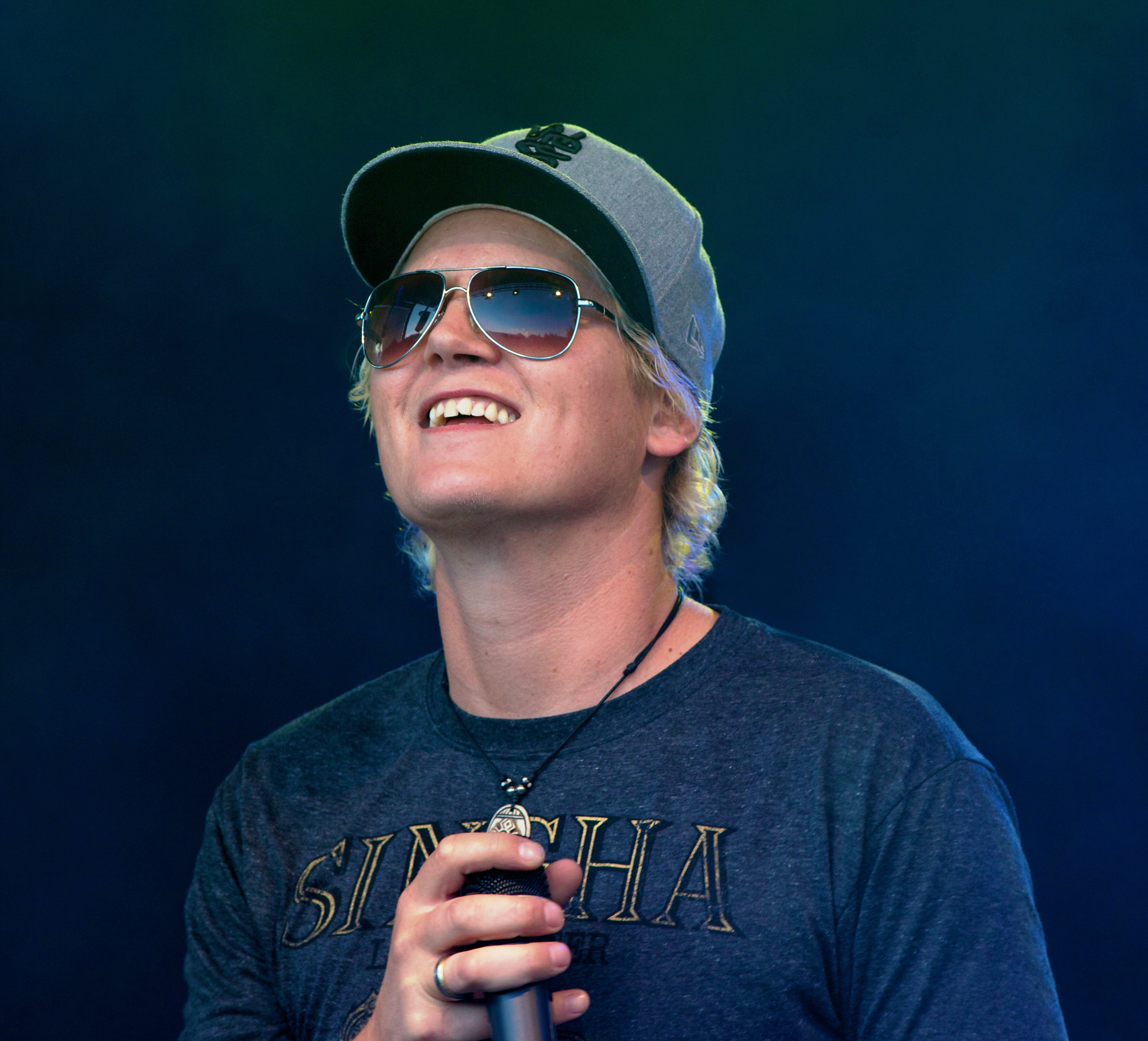
- Vinni in 2011

Background information
- Also known as: Vincent Vagabond
- Born: Øyvind Sauvik; 3 February 1976 (age 50); Arendal, Norway
- Genre: Hip hop
- Occupations: Rapper, singer, songwriter
- Years active: 2002–present
- Member of: Paperboys
- Website: vinnivagabond.no

Øyvind Sauvik (born 3 February 1976), better known by his stage name Vinni, is a Norwegian rapper and singer.

== Biography ==
Born in Arendal, Norway, Sauvik moved with his parents to Zambia when he was three years old, as they worked with development agency NORAD. He grew up in Africa and learned to speak Swahili there.

Upon his return, he formed the hip hop duo Paperboys with Jarle "J.J." Hollerud. When JJ left the formation, he was replaced by DJ Ole Alexander "Pope Dawg" Halstensgård. In the duo Øyvind Sauvik was popularly known as Vincent Vagabond or just Vinni. The band released a number of successful albums.

In 2009, Vinni took part in the Norwegian TV 2 channel's reality television program Det store korslaget, a competition of choirs. He took on a choir from Kolbotn where they finished 5th in the competition out of 7 choirs taking part.

In 2009, he also took part in Zebra Grand Prix a car racing competition of celebrities broadcast on TV2 Zebra where Vinni partnered with Vibeke Klemetsen. Although the couple passed the preliminary round of the race, they were eliminated after the semi-final race. The partners Trine Rein & Jan Erik Larssen were the eventual winners.

=== Vinni and the Vagabonds ===
In 2010, he carved for himself an independent musical career with his band Vinni and the Vagabonds with a release of the album Happily Lost.

=== In Hver gang vi møtes ===
Vinni also took part in the reality television program Hver gang vi møtes also on TV 2, with well-known singers competing by performing hits of the other participants. Vinni's interpretation were:

1. Halvdan Sivertsen episode – "Sommerfuggel i vinterland"
2. Bertine Zetlitz episode – "Apples & Diamonds"
3. Jan Eggum episode – "Kor é alle helter hen?"
4. Anne Grete Preus episode – "Millimeter"
5. Øyvind "Vinni" Sauvik episode – Being his week, the other participants sang Vinni's own hits with Elvira Nikolaisen singing "Barcelona", Jan Eggum singing "Tomorrow", Bertine Zetlitz singing "Change My Star", Øystein Dolmen singing "Let the Monkey Out", Anne Grete Preus singing "Medisin" and Halvdan Sivertsen singing "Lonesome Traveller"
6. Elvira Nikolaisen episode – "Nothing to Lose"
7. Øystein Dolmen episode – "God morgen Norge"

EMI released a compilation of the performances on an album entitled Venner. Vinni's interpretation of "Sommerfuggel i vinterland" from Halvdan Sivertsen proved to be the most popular of all the performances.

In 2012, Vinni had a huge success with the single "Sommerfuggel i Vinterland" that he performed initially during Hver gang vi møtes. the song stayed at the top of the VG-lista, the official Norwegian Singles Chart, for five consecutive weeks. This top selling single was replaced by yet another of his Hver gang vi møtes performances, namely "Godmorgen Norge" which also reached No. 1 and stayed at the top of the VG-lista for another two weeks, making it a total of seven consecutive weeks for Vinni on top of the Norwegian charts in 2012.

Based on this immense success, Vinni released a third single, "Halve meg", that entered the Norwegian Singles Chart at No. 4 in its first week of release. A studio album was expected during 2012.

== Discography ==
=== Albums ===
==== Solo ====
| Year | Album | Peak position | Certifications |
| Year | Album | NOR | Certifications |
|---|---|---|---|
| 2012 | Oppvåkningen | 1 | IFPI NOR: Gold |
| 2023 | Tanker blir ting | 2 | |
| 2026 | Shivas Dans | | |

==== as Vinni and the Vagabonds ====
| Year | Album | Peak position |
| Year | Album | NOR |
|---|---|---|
| 2010 | Happily Lost | 33 |

==== as Paperboys ====
| Year | Album | Peak position | Certifications |
| Year | Album | NOR | Certifications |
|---|---|---|---|
| 2002 | No Cure for Life | 6 | IFPI NOR: Gold |
| 2003 | The Great Escape | 3 | IFPI NOR: Gold |
| 2005 | When Worlds Collide | 13 | |
| 2006 | So Far So Good... Songs & Singles | 4 | |
| 2006 | The Oslo Agreement | 4 | |

=== Singles ===
| Single | Year | Peak chart positions | Certifications | Album |
| Single | Year | NOR | Certifications | Album |
|---|---|---|---|---|
| "Sommerfuggel i vinterland" | 2012 | 1 | IFPI NOR: 9× Platinum | |
| "Godmorgen Norge" | 2012 | 1 | | |
| "Halve meg" | 2012 | 4 | | |
| "Glorie" | 2022 | 4 | IFPI NOR: 2× Platinum | |
| "Evig og alltid" (with Emma Steinbakken) | 2023 | 33 | | |
| "Håpløs" (with Roc Boyz) | 2026 | 1 | | |

==== as Vinni & the Vagabonds ====
| Single | Year | Peak chart positions | Album |
| Single | Year | NOR | Album |
|---|---|---|---|
| "Let the Monkey Out" (feat. Timbuktu) | 2012 | 13 | Happily Lost |

==== as Paperboys ====
| Single | Year | Peak chart positions | Certifications | Album |
| Single | Year | NOR | Certifications | Album |
|---|---|---|---|---|
| "Barcelona" (feat. Madcon) | 2002 | 12 | IFPI NOR: Platinum | No Cure for Life |
| "Find My Way" | 2002 | 11 | | So Far So Good - Songs & Singles |
| "What You Need" | 2003 | 5 | | The Great Escape |
| "On the Low" | 2003 | 13 | | The Great Escape |
| "One Day" | 2004 | 4 | | So Far So Good - Songs & Singles |
| "Wiggle It" | 2005 | 9 | | So Far So Good - Songs & Singles |
| "Keep It Cool" | 2005 | 9 | | So Far So Good - Songs & Singles |
| "Lonesome Traveler" | 2009 | 1 | IFPI NOR: 6× Platinum | The Oslo Agreement |
