= Heine Totland =

Norwegian-Danish singer

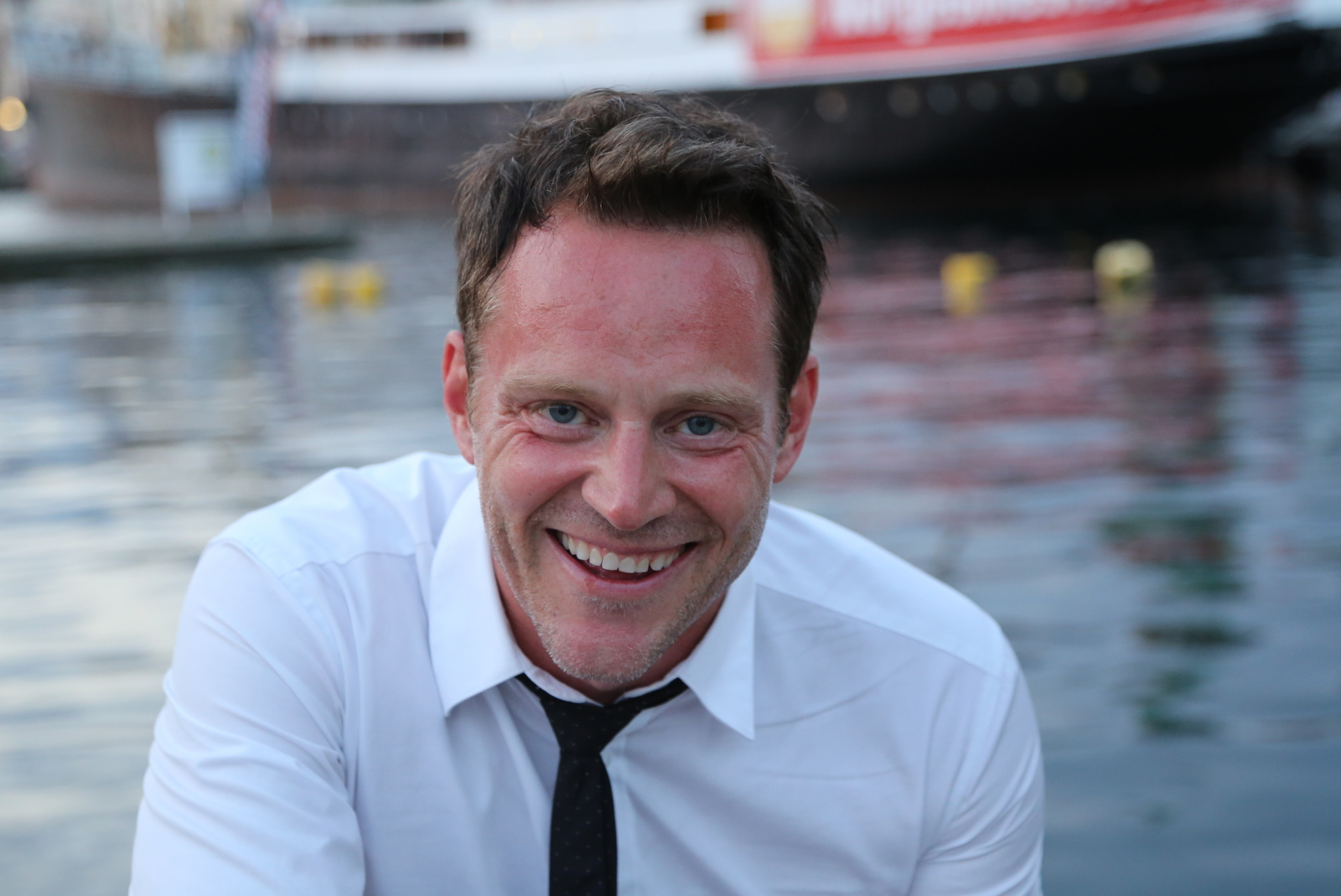
- Totland at Gladmat 2014

Background information
- Born: 16 October 1970 (age 55); Moster, Norway
- Genres: Jazz; Pop Standards
- Occupation: Musician
- Instrument: Vocals
- Website: frikkmusikk.no/heine-totland

Heine Totland (born 16 October 1970 in Moster, Bømlo Municipality, Norway) is a Norwegian-Danish singer and has featured in several prominent productions, like State, Gli Scapoli, Silje Nergaard, the musical Sophies verden, Køhn/Johansen Sextet, among others.

== Career ==
Totland was educated at the Music College at Stord, and Franz Liszt Academy of Music in Budapest. Since 1995, he has been a professional artist living in Oslo. With his classical background, he was one of the initiators of the male vocal group Gli Scapoli. He has played the leading parts in a number of musicals: Twice as Judas, twice as Jesus in Jesus Christ Superstar, as Marius in a highly successful staging of Les Misérables as Freddy Trumper, and The American in Chess. The Norwegian audience has absolutely embraced the all round entertainer, and over the recent two years he has become one of the most popular sought for singers in Norway, actively performing all over the country, as well as internationally. In 2009 he was Harry in the play Mama Mia on Det nye det Folketeatret.

Totland has made several appearances over the last years, among them on the official TV show celebrating Norway's 100 years anniversary in 2005, different TV gala shows, he performed in Angola, Dubai, at the outdoor 100th anniversary celebration of Hydro in Oslo, and at the Royal Castle.

Totland released his first solo album Tough Times for Gentlemen and it went into the Norwegian Top 20 pop charts. Together with a bouquet of the best songwriters in Norway, namely Hans Petter Aaserud, Silje Nergaard, Geir Luedy, Sigurd Køhn, and others, he has composed ten original songs, arranged for brass and strings and with a balancing between jazz and pop. The album is produced by Geir Luedy and Hans Petter Aaserud. Tough Times for Gentlemen was released in Germany in 2007.

Totland has toured with Gisle Børge Styve, known from Beat for Beat at NRK, which showed off when they performed the popular presentation of "Bohemian Rhapsody" in Beat for Beat. His first solo album Tough Times for Gentlemen was released in 2005, and the next album The Sunny Side in 2009.

== Private life ==
He was married to Silje Nergaard from 1998 until 2022. They have two daughters and one son together.

== Discography ==
Solo albums

- Tough Times for Gentlemen (2005)
- The Sunny Side (2009)

Participation

- Melodi Grand Prix 2010 (2009), as participant
