= Hans Petter Aaserud =

Norwegian singer and songwriter (born 1971)

- Born: 12 December 1971 (age 54)
- Origin: Tønsberg, Norway
- Occupation: song writer
- Years active: 1992
- Label: Norsk Plateproduksjon
- Website: www.trangfodsel.no

Hans Petter Aaserud (born 12 December 1971) is a Norwegian singer and songwriter, mostly known as a guitarist in the band Trang Fødsel, founded in 1992. He has collaborated with a long list of artists, including several contributions to the Norwegian version of Eurovision Song Contest, Melodi Grand Prix. In 2018 he participated in Season 7 of Hver gang vi møtes.

== Discography ==
Singles

- Imagine (2017), med Tshawe Baqwa & Tor Endresen

=== Trang fødsel ===
Albums

- Bare barnet (1995)
- Hybel (1997)
- Feber (1998)
- Damp (1999)
- De aller beste (2005)
- Hammock (2007)
- Ryktet (2011)

Singles

- Kursiv (1997)
- Hippie (1997)
- Livet det er helt ålreit (1997)
- James Bond (1997)
- Midt i trynet (1997)
- Manisk (1998)
- Bing bang (1998)
- Drømmedame (1998)
- Hele veien hjem (1999)
- Ligg unna (1999)
- Det kimer i klokker og klirrer i glass (2003)
- Fredag (2005)
- Ikke meg (2007)
- Utopia (2009)
- Ryktet (2011)
- Because I Can Sing (2011), featuring Chris Barron
- Livet mitt lever meg (2014)
- Jeg er faen meg det beste som har skjedd deg (2018)

=== The Canoes ===
- Booze and Canoes (2012)

=== Mulle Miktor ===
- Mulle Miktor (2002)

=== My Favorite Enemy ===
- My Favorite Enemy (2011)

=== Features on ===
- Logikal: Maniacs, Panics and Crashes (1999)
- Pirum Old Boys: Sha-ka-Sha-ka (1999)
- The Wonderboys: B & B's (2000)
- Paris: I do Believe (2001)
- Paris: You Know Me (2002)
- Nicole Lacy: It Was Me (2002)
- Trucks: It's Just Porn Mum/Trouble (2002)
- Trucks: Without You (2002)
- Jack: Star (2003)
- Trucks: Kicking (2003)
- Gaute Ormåsen: New Kid in Town (2003)
- Trucks: Juice (2003)
- West Audio: Rogasnadder (2003)
- Warner Music/Universal Music: Un Maxx' 2 Bruit (2003)
- Jack: Eating Out (2004)
- Glenn: Thanks for Leaving (2004)
- Re-Pita: Re-Play – Re-Pita Mania 2 (2004)
- Jack: Good Girls/15 Minutes of Fame (2004)
- Heine Totland: Atlantis (2004)
- Jack: You Don't Know Jack (2004)
- Heine Totland: Happy As i Am (2005)
- Robert Post: Got None/Give (2005)
- Heine Totland: Crying Shame (2005)
- Robert Post: Robert Post (2005)
- Heine Totland: Tough Times for Gentlemen (2005)
- Lee Harding: What's Wrong with This Picture? (2006)
- Robert Post: The Way We Are EP (2006)
- Aleksander With: The Other Side (2006)
- Aleksander With: Coming Home (2006)
- Susanne Sundfør: Walls (2006)
- D-Side: Unbroken (2006)
- Den Norske Mannsoktett: Voices of Norway (2006)
- Barneselskapet: Barna synger Pophits (2006)
- Susanne Sundfør: Susanne Sundfør (2007)
- Karin Park: Can't Stop Now (2007)
- Gareth Gates: Pictures of the Other Side (2007)
- Celine: Bæstevænna (2007)
- Surferosa: The Beat on the Street (2008)
- Heine Totland: Oh, June (2008)
- Malin: Pang! (2008)
- Melodi Grand Prix: Melodi Grand Prix 2009 (2009)
- Heine Totland: Out Last Summer (2009)
- The Pink Robots: Pink Robots (2009)
- Karin Park: Ashes to Gold (2009)
- Heine Totland: Sunny Side (2009)
- Heine Totland: The Sunny Side (2009)
- a1: Take You Home (2009)
- Trine Rein ft. Paal Flaata: Not for Long (2010)
- Melodi Grand Prix: Melodi Grand Prix 2010 (2010)
- Aleksander With: Still Awake (2010)
- Barnas supershow: Barnas Supershow – Hytta vår (2010)
- Trine Rein: Seeds of Joy (2010)
- The Pink Robots: The Pink Robots (2010)
- Celine: Jentekveld (2010)
- a1: Waiting for Daylight (2010)
- Didrik Solli-Tangen: Guilty Pleasures (2010)
- Malin: Paradis (2011)
- Christine Guldbrandsen: Colors (2011)
- Trine Rein: Just the Way I Am (2011)
- Alejandro Fuentes: Stop Beggin' Me (2011)
- Moi: Chair-o-Planes Part One (2011)
- Frelsesarmeen: 10 år med Frelsesarmeens jule-CD (2011)
- Melodi Grand Prix: Melodi Grand Prix 2012 (2012)
- Aleksander With: Once (2012)
- Susanne Sundfør: The Silicone Veil (2012)
- Aleksander With: Aleksander With (2012)
- Alejandro Fuentes: All My Life (2012)
- Herborg Kråkevik: Jul i stova (2012)
- Mathea-Mari: One of Them (2016)
- Kreftomsorg Rogaland: Kreftomsorg Rogaland 9 (2016)
- Tshawe Baqwa: Drømmedame (2018)
- Hver gang vi møtes: Hver gang vi møtes – Sesong 7 (2018)
