= Gustav Lorentzen =

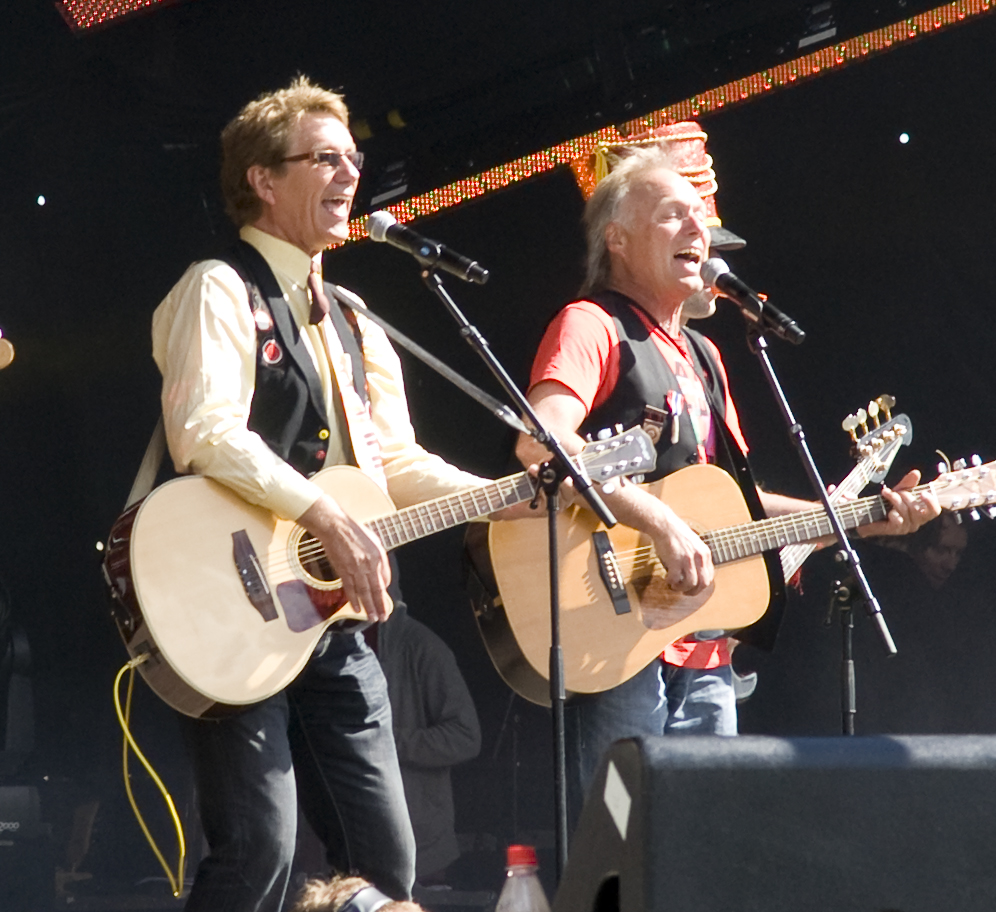
- Gustav Lorentzen (left) and Øystein Dolmen (right) during a Knutsen & Ludvigsen concert in Oslo, 2006.

Background information
- Also known as: Ludvigsen
- Born: 28 September 1947; Bergen, Norway
- Died: 21 April 2010 (aged 62) Outside Bergen, Norway
- Genres: Pop, children's songs, humour
- Occupations: Musician, songwriter, record producer, author
- Instruments: Guitar, vocals, bass guitar, drums, piano, accordion
- Years active: 1970–2010

Gustav Lorentzen (28 September 1947 – 21 April 2010), also known by his stage name Ludvigsen, was a Norwegian singer-songwriter, best known from being half of the successful duo Knutsen & Ludvigsen, alongside Øystein "Knutsen" Dolmen. He went solo in 1986, winning four Spellemann awards and one nomination for his 5 albums.

In addition to music, Lorentzen made several TV series and books, mostly intended for children. He also had a degree in acoustics from the Norwegian Institute of Technology.

From 1997 until his death, Lorentzen collaborated with the psychologist Magne Raundalen, creating a therapeutic program for traumatized children, mainly victims of wars. He was also a UNICEF Ambassador since 1993.

On 21 April 2010, Lorentzen collapsed during an orienteering competition outside of Bergen and went into cardiac arrest. He was pronounced dead a few minutes later.
