= CC Cowboys =

Norwegian rock band

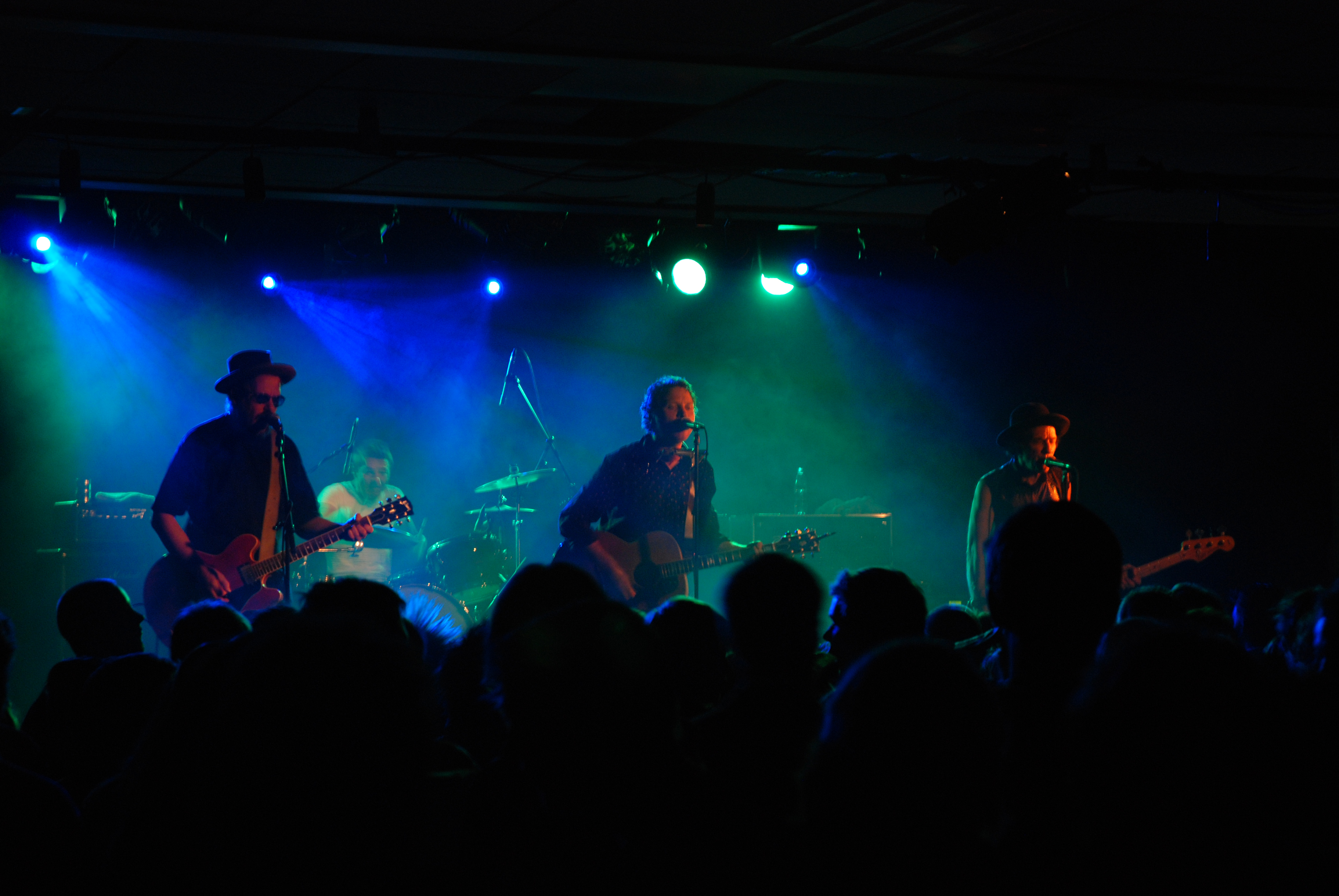
- CC Cowboys live performance at Hydranten, Hamar 2007)

Background information
- Origin: Fredrikstad, Norway
- Genres: Rock, pop
- Years active: 1990–1998, 2003–present
- Labels: BMI
- Members: Magnus Grønneberg; Jørn Christensen; Per Vestaby; Agne Sæther
- Past members: Anders Grønneberg; Trond Berg; Håvard Eidsaunet; Kjetil Melkersen
- Website: www.cccowboys.no

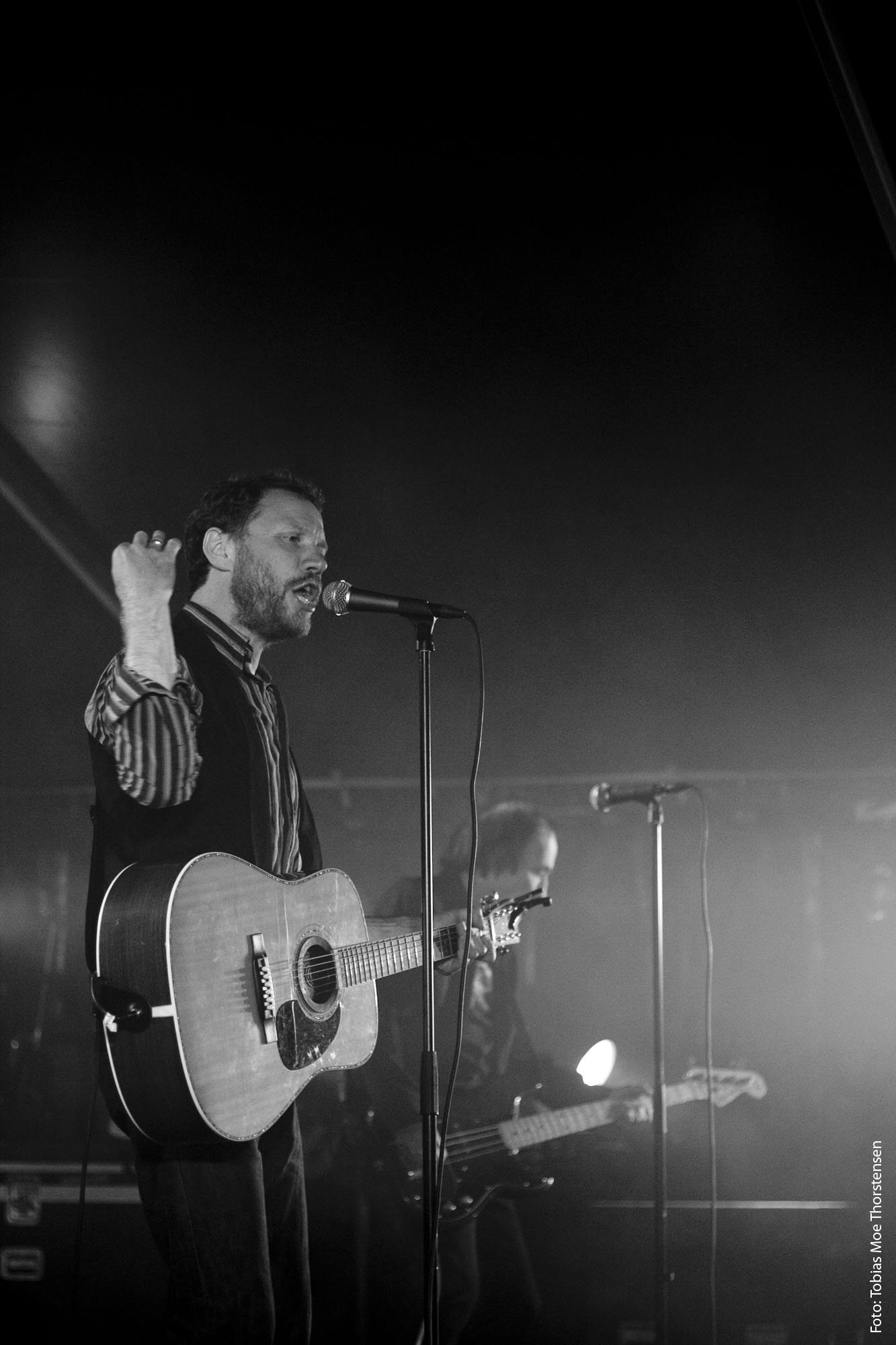
Tobias Moe Thorstensen at CC Cowboys concert in Gjøvik

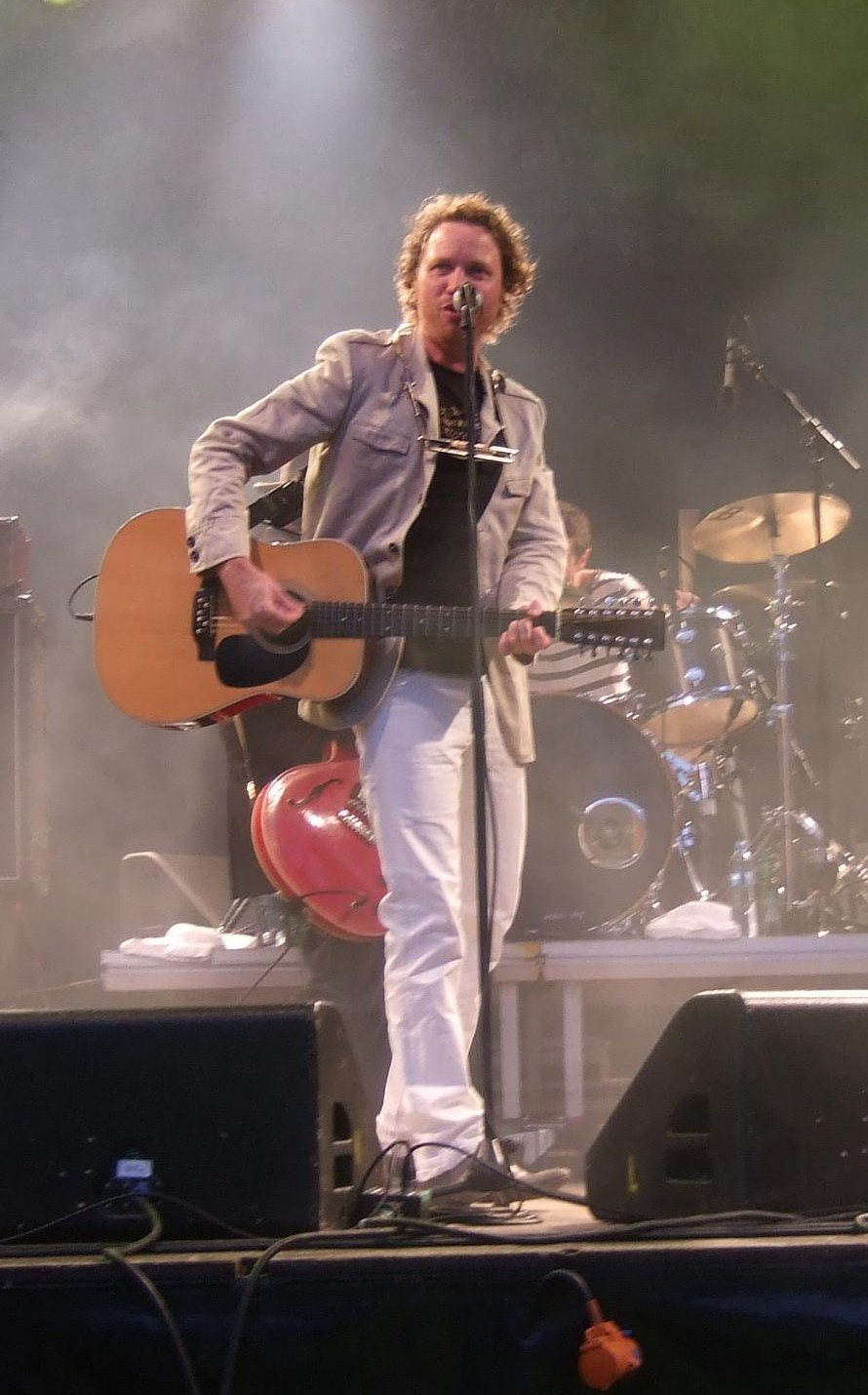
Magnus Grønneberg in Parkenfestivalen in 2007

CC Cowboys is a Norwegian rock band from Fredrikstad. Their members are the vocalist and guitarist Magnus Grønneberg, their guitarist Jørn Christensen their bassist Per Vestaby and their drummer Agne Sæther. The name of the band originates from the song "C.C. Cowboys" by Swedish rock group Imperiet.

== Discography ==
=== Albums ===
Studio albums

Year	Album	Peak positions	Certification
Year	Album	NOR	Certification
1990	Blodsbrødre	4	
1991	Rock'n Roll ryttere	4	
1992	Tigergutt	7	NOR: Gold
1994	Persille & panser	9	NOR: Gold
1996	Himmeltitter	20	
2003	Lyst	8	
2006	Evig liv	4	
2009	Morgen og kveld	2	
2011	Innriss	3	
2015	Til det blir dag	2	NOR: Gold
2018	Perfekt normal	19	

Live albums

Year	Album	Peak positions	Certification
Year	Album	NOR	Certification
2016	Live – Synder i sommersol	17	

Compilation albums

Year	Album	Peak positions	Certification
Year	Album	NOR	Certification
1998	Ekko (Best Of)	1	NOR: 2× Platinum
2007	På Svalbard uten strøm	9	
2011	40 beste	3	NOR: Platinum

=== Songs ===
Year	Single	Peak positions	Album
Year	Single	NOR	Album
1990	"Harry"	4	Blodsbrødre
1991	"Barnehjemmet Johnny Johnny"	4	Rock'n Roll ryttere
1993	"People in Motion"	6	
1994	"Når du sover"	7	Persille & panser
2007	"Kom igen"	14	På Svalbard uten strøm
2009	"Kanskje du behøver noen"	13	
