= Christel Alsos =

Norwegian singer

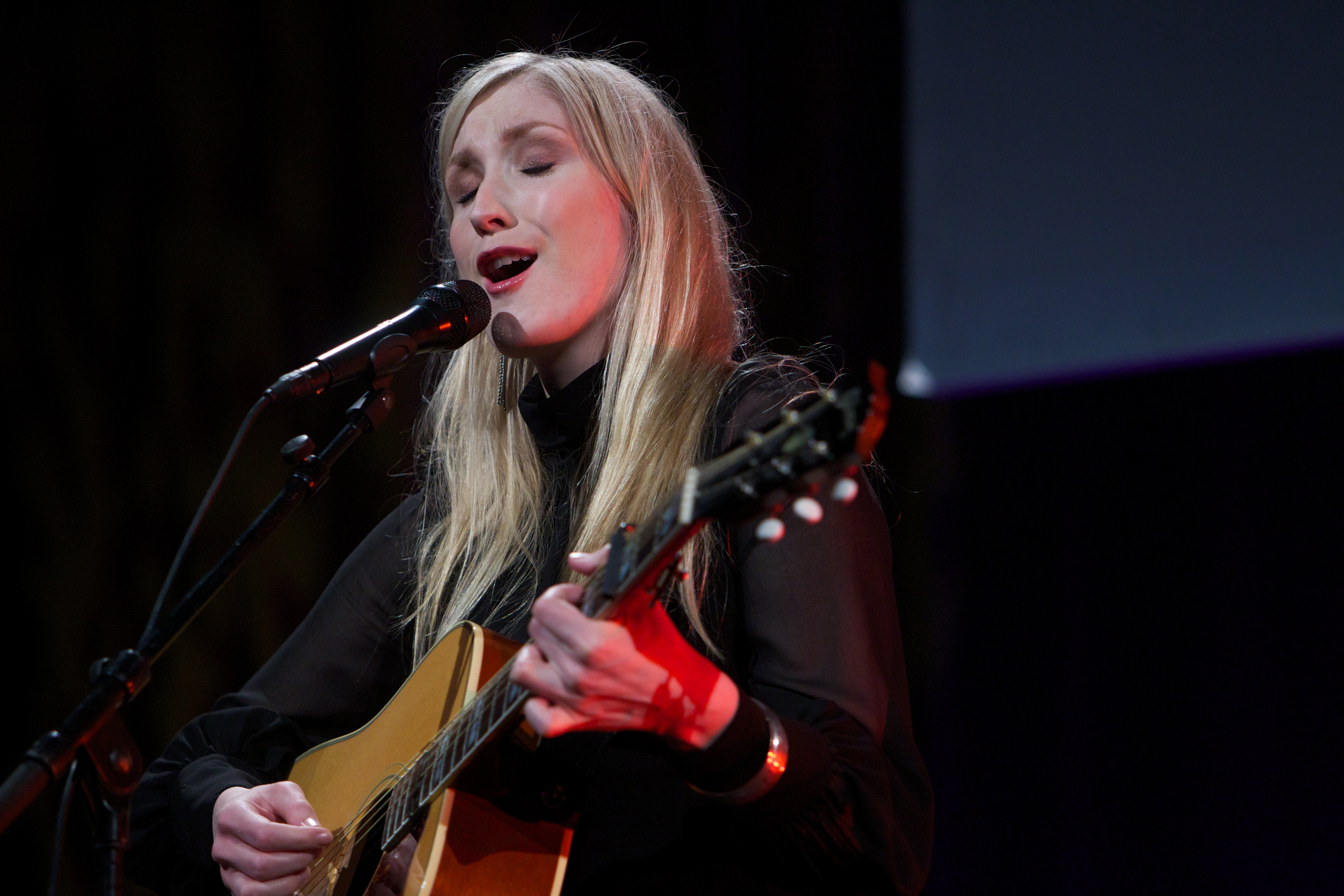
- Christel Alsos (2010)

Background information
- Born: Christel Alsos Monsen; 20 December 1984 (age 41); Fauske Municipality, Norway
- Genres: Pop
- Years active: 2004 – present
- Labels: Sony BMG
- Website: www.christelalsos.no

Christel Alsos Monsen (born 20 December 1984) is a Norwegian singer originating from Fauske Municipality in Nordland county.

After high school graduation in 2003, she moved to Gjøvik Municipality to study music at Viken Folkehøgskole. In 2004, she moved to Oslo. Having appeared on TV program Noen bedre with Tore Strømøy on NRK in autumn 2004, she was discovered by the record company Sony BMG, which she signed a contract with.

She gained fame through her single "Come On" in 2006 and has released four successful albums. She has been nominated for Spellemannprisen (equivalent of Norwegian Grammies) several times. In 2006 for "Music video of the year" for "Come On", in 2007 for Best Newcomer" and "Best female artist" after her debut album Closing the Distance and in 2010 in the category "Best female artist" for her album Tomorrow Is.

== Discography ==
=== Albums ===
| Year | Album | Peak positions | Certification |
| Year | Album | NOR | Certification |
|---|---|---|---|
| 2007 | Closing the Distance | 3 | |
| 2010 | Tomorrow Is | 6 | |
| 2013 | Presence | 3 | |
| 2013 | I den kalde vinter | 2 | |

=== Singles ===
| Year | Single | Peak positions | Album |
| Year | Single | NOR | Album |
|---|---|---|---|
| 2006 | "Come On" | 12 | Closing the Distance |
