= Øystein Dolmen =

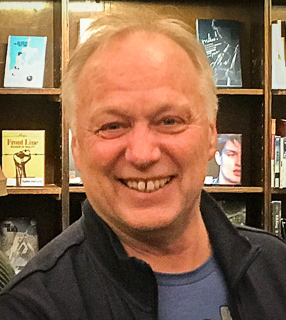
Øystein Dolmen in 2017

Øystein Dolmen (born 19 February 1947), also known as Knutsen, is a Norwegian singer-songwriter best known for being one half of the duo Knutsen & Ludvigsen, alongside Gustav Lorentzen ("Ludvigsen"). Knutsen & Ludvigsen was a humorous duo whose albums were primarily intended for children, but also became popular with more mature audiences.

Dolmen was born in Trondheim. He and Lorentzen formed Knutsen & Ludvigsen in 1970, and released five albums between 1970 and 1983, twice winning Spellemann awards for best children's record. They split up in 1986, but reformed for a series of one-off reunion concerts in 2004, 2005 and 2006.

In 1989, Dolmen released his first album without Lorentzen, called "På frifot". This time he collaborated with female singer Ellen Klemp (aka Nellie Neuf), and the album earned Dolmen another Spellemann award for best children's record. In 1991, he released his first solo album as the character "Feskhandler Thorske" ("Fishmonger Cod").

In addition to his musical career, Dolmen has also hosted children's shows on NRK television, and authored several children's books.
