= Knutsen & Ludvigsen =

Norwegian singing duo

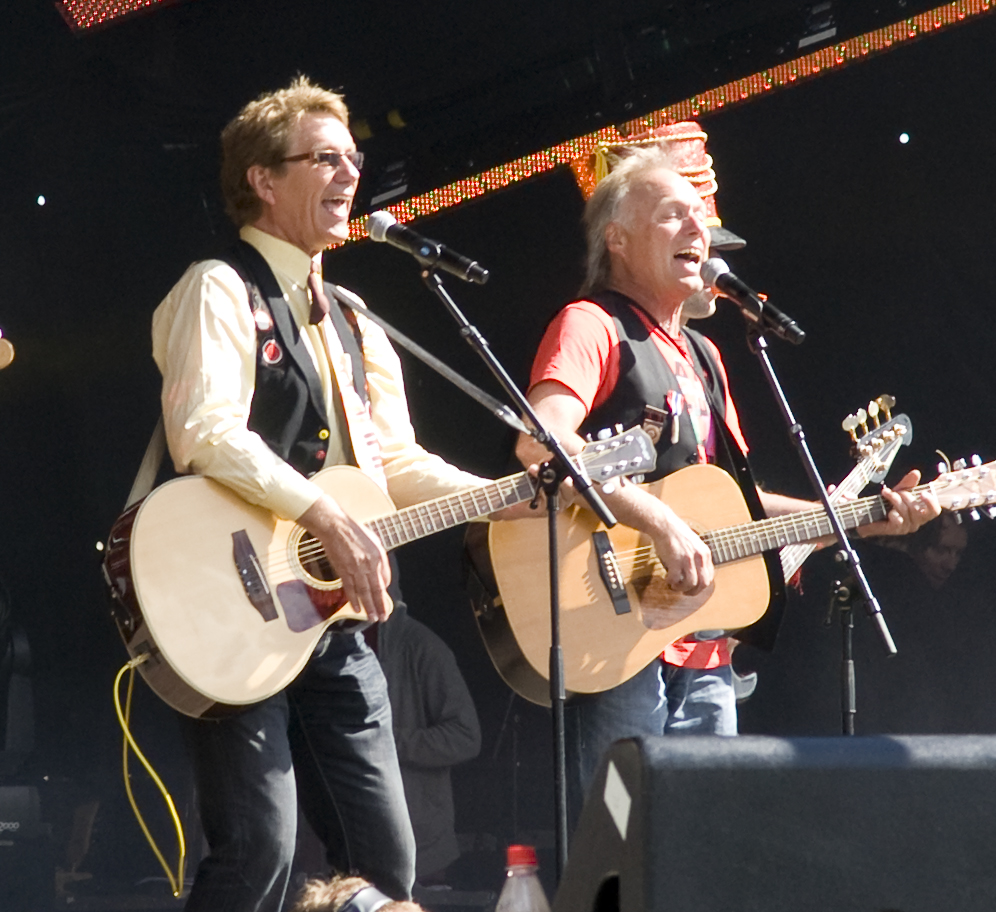
Knutsen (right) and Ludvigsen (left) at Rådhusplassen in Oslo

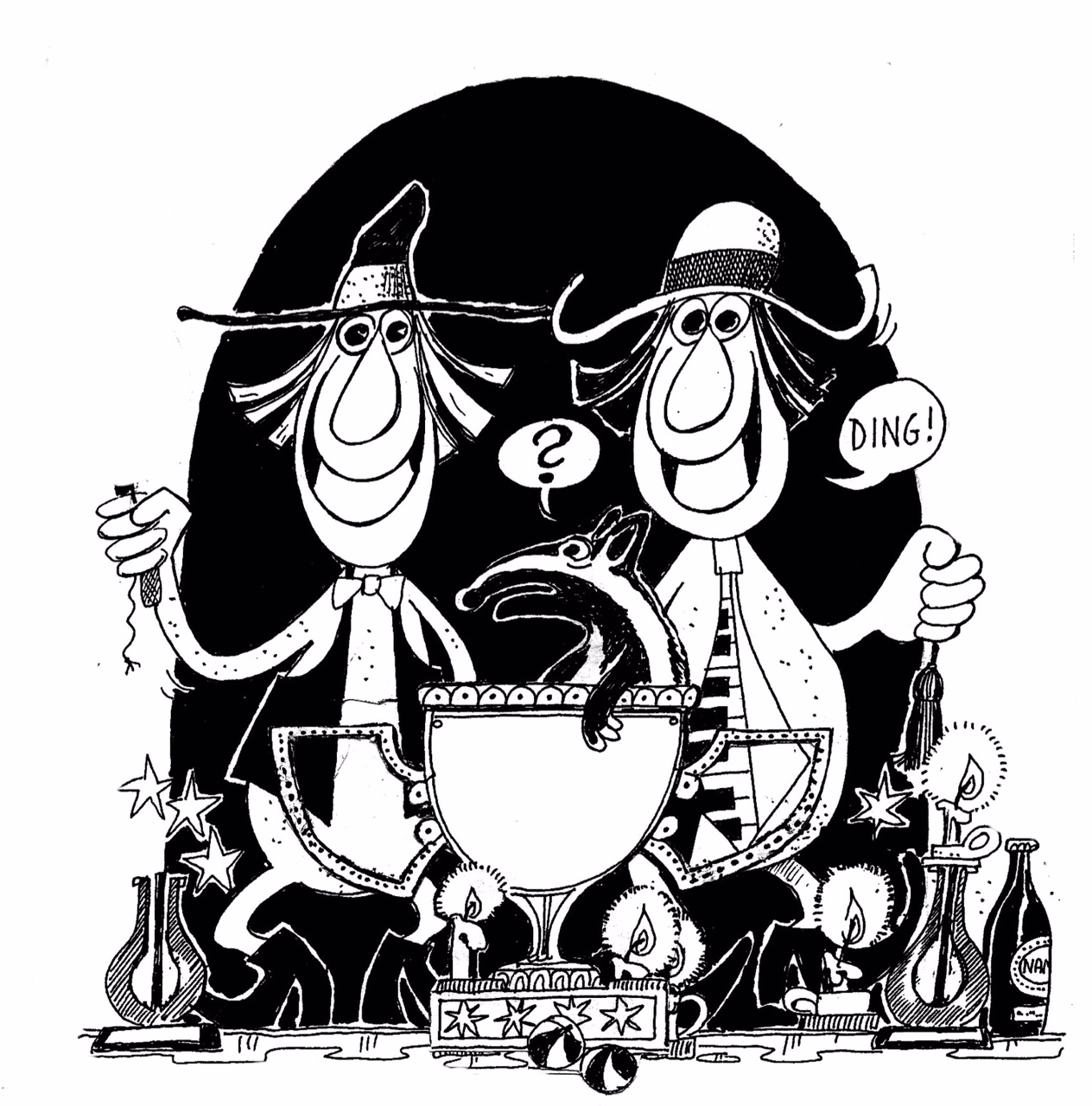
Knutsen & Ludvigsen, drawn by Øystein Dolmen

Knutsen & Ludvigsen (English: Tootson and Ludiwood) was a Norwegian singing duo consisting of Øystein Dolmen ("Knutsen") and Gustav Lorentzen ("Ludvigsen").

Writing and performing various songs mostly aimed at children, they released seven albums, two of which received Spellemannprisen, the Norwegian Grammy. They had several #1 hits, including "Grevling i taket", "Hallo! Hallo!" and "Dum og deilig". Since the late 1990s, they have enjoyed a cult status among young Norwegians, performing a series of reunion concerts.

October 26, 2006, TV 2 broadcast the program Knutsen & Ludvigsen - The Full Story. The Norwegian Pop & Rock Encyclopedia says: "This was more than a famous duo - Knutsen & Ludvigsen was an institution. The whole rock generation of the nineties was nourished by their records."

On 21 April 2010, Gustav Lorentzen died from a heart attack while participating in an orienteering race near Bergen. He was 62.

== Discography ==
- Knutsen & Ludvigsen (1970)
- Brunost no igjæn (1972) #23
- Nr. 3 - Tut (1974)
- Bakklandet Bassangforening: Ned Med Nidaros (1975)
- Du milde Mosart! (1977)
- Fiskepudding! Lakrisbåter! (1980) #13
- Juba Juba (1983) #3

=== Compilations ===
- Samleplate (1984)
- Knutsen & Ludvigsens Beste (1996) (Translated: Best) #4
- Knutsen & Ludvigsens Ver'ste' (1997) (Translated pun: Worst/Workshop)
- Dum og Deilig: Knutsen & Ludvigsens Beste (2008) #10

== Movies ==
- Knutsen & Ludvigsen og den fæle Rasputin (2015) (International title: Two Buddies and a Badger)
