= Henning Kvitnes =

Norwegian musician

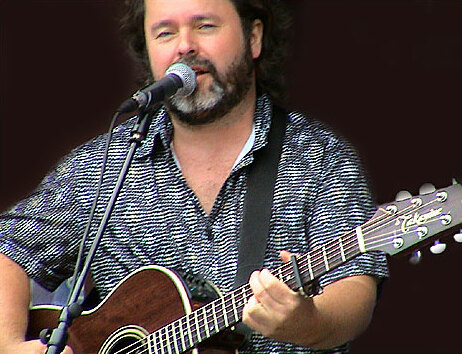
Henning Kvitnes

Henning Kvitnes (born 13 May 1958) is a singer/songwriter from Tistedal, Halden in Norway. His debut came with The Ice Cream Band, but he later found bigger success as a solo artist.

== Biography ==
Kvitnes first made a name for himself in 1978, with The Ice Cream Band, who warmed up for Elvis Costello at Chateau Neuf in Oslo. The band soon changed name to The Young Lords. As a member of The Young Lords he released his first album, Same Shit - New Wrapping in 1980. In 1991 he released his first album in Norwegian, titled Veien hjem.

Kvitnes has during his career collaborated with several of Norway's most famous musicians, Åge Aleksandersen, Arve Tellefsen, Steinar Albrigtsen and Claudia Scott, to mention a few.

In 2007 he won a Norwegian Grammy, Spellemannsprisen, for his album Stemmer i gresset. He has also won Norsk artistsforbunds ærespris, an annual honorary title given out to stand out musicians.

== Discography ==
- 1980 - Same Shit - New Wrapping (with The Young Lords)
- 1981 - We Like to Watch (with Saturday Cowboys)
- 1982 - Little Big Horn - Live (with Saturday Cowboys)
- 1982 - The Tunnel (with Henning Kvitnes Next Step)
- 1984 - Open Roads (with Next Step)
- 1987 - Back to Little Eden (with Henning Kvitnes Little Eden)
- 1988 - Solitude Road (with Little Eden)
- 1989 - Everyday Life (with Little Eden)
- 1991 - Veien hjem
- 1991 - Songs people play (Greatest hits album)
- 1993 - Postcards from life
- 1995 - Godt Vann
- 1996 - Tida bare kommer (de beste)
- 1998 - Evig eies (kun et dårlig rykte)
- 1999 - Heartland
- 2001 - Scandicana
- 2003 - På godt norsk
- 2004 - Bare vente litt på sjelen
- 2005 - Manda' morra - 14 sanger av Stein Ove Berg
- 2006 - Ut av veggen
- 2007 - Stemmer i gresset
- 2009 - Tid for latskap
- 2010 - For sånne som oss - de beste
- 2010 - Bortkomne julestjerner med Koret på Botsen
- 2012 - Ingen tid å miste
- 2014 - Jada, vi elsker...
