= Halvdan Sivertsen =

Norwegian musician

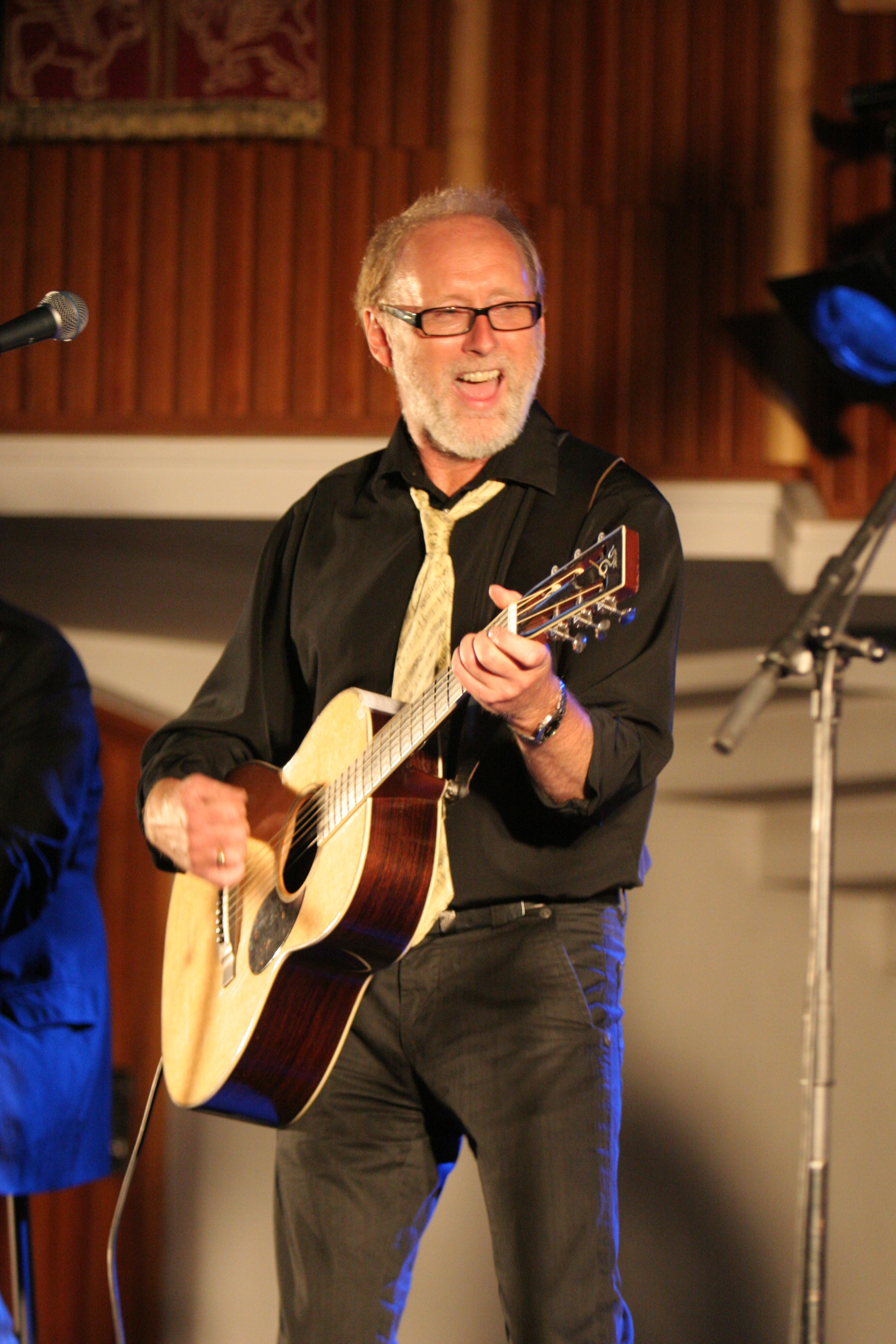
Halvdan Sivertsen

Halvdan Sivertsen (born 5 January 1950) is a Norwegian singer-songwriter and guitarist. He was born in Tromsø, but raised and lives in Bodø. He has won Spellemannprisen awards five times, twice with his group Gitarkameratene, and received the Culture Prize of Nordland county in 2000. His album Kjærlighetslandet reached number eight on the Norway albums chart.

The Norwegian Society of Composers and Lyricists awarded him the "lyrics of the year"-prize in 2010 and an accompanying grant totalling 25 000 Norwegian kroner, for his song Dødsbra dop — a criticism of Norwegian soldiers' behaviour in Afghanistan, and Norwegian politicians.

== Discography ==
=== Albums ===
- Halvdan 23 1/2 år (1973)
- Utsikt minus innsikt gir tilnærmet blindhet fra toppen av pyramiden (1975)
- Nordaførr (1979)
- Liv laga (1981)
- Amerika (1985)
- Ny og naken (1987)
- "Førr ei dame" (1989)
- Hilsen Halvdan (1991)
- Kjærlighetslandet (1995)
- Helt Halvdan (1996)
- Tvil, håp og kjærlighet (2001)
- Frelsesearmeens Juleplate (2003)
- 40+ (2005)
- Mellom oss (2008)
- Gjør det så gjerne (2012)

=== Singles ===
- "Gladiatorglimt (ode til Bodø Glimt)" / "Syng sjøl" (1976) with Terje Nilsen under the name Halvdan og den gule fare
- "Hvis du vil ha mæ" (1995)
- "Aldri så nær som da" (1996)
- "Pus har løpetid" (1996)
- "Bli med mæ dit" (2008)
- "Venta på toget" (2008)
- "Ola Diger" (2008)
- "Twisted Little Star" (2012)
- "Lonesome Traveller" (2012)

with Gitarkameratene

- "Gitarkameratene" (1989)
- "Typisk norsk" (1990)

=== With other artists ===
- Mitt lille land (2011)
