= Øystein =

Øystein is a Norwegian given name of Old Norse origins. One of its variants is Östen which is mostly used in Sweden. Notable people with the name include:

- Øystein Aarseth (1968–1993), Norwegian guitarist (pseudonym Euronymous), co-founder of the black metal band Mayhem
- Øystein Alme (born 1960), Norwegian author
- Øystein Andersen or Wig Wam, Norwegian hard rock and glam rock band
- Øystein Baadsvik (born 1966), Norwegian tuba soloist and chamber musician
- Øystein Bache (born 1960), Norwegian comedian and actor
- Øystein B. Blix (born 1966), Norwegian jazz musician (trombone) and sound designer
- Øystein Bonvik (born 1971), Norwegian communication consultant, writer and lecturer
- Øystein Bråten (born 1995), Norwegian freestyle skier
- Øystein Brun (born 1975), the guitarist and founder of the Norwegian black metal band Borknagar
- Øystein Carlsen (born 1973), Norwegian speed skater
- Øystein Dahle (born 1938), Norwegian businessperson and organizational leader
- Øystein Djupedal (born 1960), Norwegian politician for the Socialist Left Party
- Øystein Dolmen (born 1947), known as Knutsen, Norwegian singer-songwriter, one half of the duo Knutsen & Ludvigsen
- Øystein Drillestad (born 1970), Norwegian footballer
- Øystein Elgarøy (1929–1998), Norwegian astronomer, with a specialty in solar radio astronomy
- Øystein Erlendsson (died 1188), Archbishop of Nidaros from 1161 to his death
- Øystein Fevang (born 1963), Norwegian singer and choir conductor
- Øystein Fischer (1942–2013), Norwegian physicist and specialist in the field of superconductivity
- Øystein Gåre (1954–2010), Norwegian football coach
- Øystein Greni (born 1974), the singer and lead guitar player of the Norwegian rock and roll band BigBang
- Øystein Grødum (born 1977), Norwegian speedskater, who is a member of Arendal SK
- Øystein Halvorsen, Norwegian orienteering competitor who competed in the 1970s
- Øystein Haraldsson (c. 1125 – 1157), king of Norway from 1142 to 1157
- Øystein Hauge (born 1956), Norwegian writer
- Øystein Havang (born 1964), Norwegian handball player
- Øystein Hedstrøm (born 1946), Norwegian politician
- Øystein Gullvåg Holter (born 1952), Norwegian sociologist and expert on men's studies
- Øystein I (1088–1123), King of Norway (as Eystein I) from 1103 to 1123 with his brothers Sigurd the Crusader and Olaf Magnusson
- Øystein III, elected a rival King of Norway during the Norwegian Civil War period
- Øystein Jarlsbo (born 1961), former Norwegian ice hockey player
- Øystein Josefsen (born 1944), Norwegian businessman and former politician for the Conservative Party
- Øystein Kristiansen, Norwegian orienteering competitor and World champion
- Øystein Ingar Larsen (born 1941), Bishop of the Diocese of Sør-Hålogaland from 1992 to 2006
- Øystein Linnebo, Norwegian philosopher of mathematics at Birkbeck College, University of London
- Øystein Lønn (1936–2022), Norwegian writer
- Øystein Mæland (born 1960), Norwegian psychiatrist, civil servant and politician for the Labour Party
- Øystein Mellerud (1938–1989), Norwegian ice hockey player
- Øystein Moen (born 1980), Norwegian jazz pianist and composer, plays in the bands Jaga Jazzist and Puma
- Øystein Neerland (born 1964), former Norwegian football forward, best known for his time in Molde
- Øystein Norvoll (born 1954), Norwegian jazz musician (guitar), winner of the «Gjett på Jazz» (1973)
- Øystein Olsen (economist) (born 1952), Norwegian public servant, Governor of the Central Bank of Norway
- Øystein Olsen (ice hockey) (born 1969), former Norwegian ice hockey player
- Øystein Ore (1899–1968), Norwegian mathematician
- Øystein Kvaal Østerbø (born 1981), Norwegian orienteering and ski-orienteering competitor
- Øystein Øvretveit (born 1994), Norwegian footballer
- Øystein Øystå, born as Øystein Anderssen (1934–2014), Norwegian writer
- Øystein Paasche (born 1963), Norwegian musician and drummer in deLillos
- Øystein Pettersen (born 1983), Norwegian cross country skier
- Øystein Olsen Ravner (1893–1975), Norwegian appointed councilor of state (1940–1941), and minister (1941–1942)
- Øystein Rian (born 1945), Norwegian historian
- Øystein Rottem (1946–2004), Norwegian philologist, literary historian and literary critic
- Øystein Runde (born 1979), Norwegian comics writer and comics artist
- Øystein Sevåg (born 1957), Norwegian classical and world music composer and musician
- Øystein Slettemark (born 1967), Greenlandic biathlete
- Øystein Sørensen (born 1954), Norwegian historian
- Per Øystein Sørensen, Norwegian singer and songwriter, vocalist of the new wave/synthpop band Fra Lippo Lippi
- Øystein Sunde (born 1947), Norwegian folk singer and guitarist
- Øystein Thommessen (1890–1986), Norwegian lawyer
- Øystein Wiik (born 1956), Norwegian actor, singer, songwriter and novelist
- Øystein Wingaard Wolf (born 1958), Norwegian poet, living and working in Oslo
- Øystein Wormdal, retired Norwegian footballer

== See also ==
- Eystein
- Østen
