= Langsomt Mot Nord (album) =

Studio album by Langsomt Mot Nord
- Released: 1985
- Studio: Sigma Studio; Bergen, Norway
- Genre: Synth
- Label: Famous Records
- Producer: Ola Snortheim; Jørn Christensen; Erling Lund

Langsomt Mot Nord chronology
Langsomt Mot Nord (1985)	Westrveg (1988)

Langsomt Mot Nord is the first of three albums by the Norwegian synth-duo Langsomt Mot Nord.

The album was released in the formats of LP and MC by Norwegian Famous Records in 1985. It was re-issued in 1989 by Sonet Records, now titled LMN.

Label: Famous Records
Record No: LMN 101, LMNC 101
Release year: 1985

Label: Sonet Records
Record No: KSCD 12
Release year: 1989

Musicians: Ola Snortheim; drums, drum programming. Jørn Christensen; keyboards, guitars, programming.

Guest musicians: Olav Snortheim; langeleik, bukkehorn. Kjersti Bergesen; vocals. Frank Hovland; bass.

Producers: Snortheim/Christensen/Lund.

Recording location: Sigma Studio, Bergen.

== Tracks ==
1. Demring (3:41)
  Composed By – Ola Snortheim, Jørn Christensen
  Arranged By – Jørn Christensen, Ola Snortheim
  Producers – Ola Snortheim, Jørn Christensen, Erling Lund
  Drum Programming – Ola Snortheim
  Keyboards – Jørn Christensen
2. Nissedans (3:04)
  Composed By – Ola Snortheim, Jørn Christensen
  Arranged By – Jørn Christensen, Ola Snortheim
  Producers – Ola Snortheim, Jørn Christensen, Erling Lund
  Drum Programming – Ola Snortheim
  Keyboards – Jørn Christensen
  Electric Guitar – Jørn Christensen
3. Gjetarlåt Frå Hallingdal (2:00)
  Composed By – Ola Snortheim, Jørn Christensen
  Arranged By – Jørn Christensen, Ola Snortheim
  Producers – Ola Snortheim, Jørn Christensen, Erling Lund
  Drum Programming – Ola Snortheim
  Keyboards – Jørn Christensen
  Bukkehorn – Olav Snortheim
4. Tusselåt (2:38)
  Composed By – Ola Snortheim, Jørn Christensen
  Arranged By – Jørn Christensen, Ola Snortheim
  Producers – Ola Snortheim, Jørn Christensen, Erling Lund
  Drum Programming – Ola Snortheim
  Keyboards – Jørn Christensen
  Langeleik – Olav Snortheim
5. LMN (3:36)
  Composed By – Ola Snortheim, Jørn Christensen
  Arranged By – Jørn Christensen, Ola Snortheim
  Producers – Ola Snortheim, Jørn Christensen, Erling Lund
  Drum Programming – Ola Snortheim
  Keyboards – Jørn Christensen
  Vocals – Kjersti Bergesen
  Electric Guitar – Jørn Christensen
  Bass – Frank Hovland
6. Rannveig's Voggevise (2:07)
  Composed By – Ola Snortheim, Jørn Christensen
  Arranged By – Jørn Christensen, Ola Snortheim
  Producers – Ola Snortheim, Jørn Christensen, Erling Lund
  Drum Programming – Ola Snortheim
  Keyboards – Jørn Christensen
  Acoustic Guitar – Jørn Christensen
7. Juleskreia (4:17)
  Composed By – Ola Snortheim, Jørn Christensen
  Arranged By – Jørn Christensen, Ola Snortheim
  Producers – Ola Snortheim, Jørn Christensen, Erling Lund
  Drum Programming – Ola Snortheim
  Keyboards – Jørn Christensen
8. Min Sol, Min Lyst, Min Glede (1:12)
  Composed By – Ola Snortheim, Jørn Christensen
  Arranged By – Jørn Christensen, Ola Snortheim
  Producers – Ola Snortheim, Jørn Christensen, Erling Lund
  Drum Programming – Ola Snortheim
  Keyboards – Jørn Christensen
  Bukkehorn – Olav Snortheim
9. Hymne (3:42)
  Composed By – Ola Snortheim, Jørn Christensen
  Arranged By – Jørn Christensen, Ola Snortheim
  Producers – Ola Snortheim, Jørn Christensen, Erling Lund
  Drum Programming – Ola Snortheim
  Keyboards – Jørn ChristensenVocals – Kjersti Bergesen
  Acousic Guitar – Jørn Christensen
  Bass – Frank Hovland
10. Ola Drar Til Myklagard (3:37)
  Composed By – Ola Snortheim, Jørn Christensen
  Arranged By – Jørn Christensen, Ola Snortheim
  Producers – Ola Snortheim, Jørn Christensen, Erling Lund
  Drum Programming – Ola Snortheim
  Keyboards – Jørn Christensen
  Electric Guitar – Jørn Christensen
11. Frøya's Bryllup (1:53)
  Composed By – Ola Snortheim, Jørn Christensen
  Arranged By – Jørn Christensen, Ola Snortheim
  Producers – Ola Snortheim, Jørn Christensen, Erling Lund
  Drum Programming – Ola Snortheim
  Keyboards – Jørn Christensen
12. Gollum (3:29)
  Composed By – Ola Snortheim, Jørn Christensen
  Arranged By – Jørn Christensen, Ola Snortheim
  Producers – Ola Snortheim, Jørn Christensen, Erling Lund
  Drum Programming – Ola Snortheim
  Keyboards – Jørn Christensen
13. Sørgemarsj (2:57)
  Composed By – Ola Snortheim, Jørn Christensen
  Arranged By – Jørn Christensen, Ola Snortheim
  Producers – Ola Snortheim, Jørn Christensen, Erling Lund
  Drum Programming – Ola Snortheim
  Keyboards – Jørn Christensen
14. Jeg Ser Deg Søte Lam (1:20)
  Composed By – Ola Snortheim, Jørn Christensen
  Arranged By – Jørn Christensen, Ola Snortheim
  Producers – Ola Snortheim, Jørn Christensen, Erling Lund
  Drum Programming – Ola Snortheim
  Keyboards – Jørn Christensen
  Vocals – Kjersti Bergesen
  Bukkehorn – Olav Snortheim
15. Hillajah (3:17)
  Composed By – Ola Snortheim, Jørn Christensen
  Arranged By – Jørn Christensen, Ola Snortheim
  Producers – Ola Snortheim, Jørn Christensen, Erling Lund
  Drum Programming – Ola Snortheim
  Keyboards – Jørn Christensen

== Credits ==
- Drum Programming, Drums – Ola Snortheim
- Keyboards, Synthesizers – Jørn Christensen
- Programming – Jørn Christensen
- Sequencing – Jørn Christensen
- Sounds – Jørn Christensen
- Technician – Erling Lund
- Mixed By – Erling Lund, Ola Snortheim, Jørn Christensen
- Cover Photo – Fin Serck-Hanssen

== Sources in Norwegian ==
- Langsomt Mot Nord Wikipedia
- LMN (1985) Rockipedia
