= Hildring =

Studio album by Langsomt Mot Nord
- Released: 1991
- Genre: Synth
- Label: Origo Sound
- Producer: Ola Snortheim; Espen Beranek Holm

Langsomt Mot Nord chronology
Westrveg (1988)	Hildring (1991)

Hildring is the third of three albums by the Norwegian synth-duo Langsomt Mot Nord.

== Tracks ==
1. Vårvons Pris (5:03)
  Composed By – Ola Snortheim, Espen Beranek Holm
  Arranged By – Espen Beranek Holm, Ola Snortheim
  Producers – Ola Snortheim, Espen Beranek Holm
  Drum Programming – Ola Snortheim
  Keyboards – Espen Beranek Holm
  Langeleik – Olav Snortheim
  Violin – Odd Hannisdal
  Flute – Torstein Kvenås
  Electric Guitar – Fredrik Sager
2. Brynhild (3:47)
  Composed By – Ola Snortheim, Espen Beranek Holm
  Arranged By – Espen Beranek Holm, Ola Snortheim
  Producers – Ola Snortheim, Espen Beranek Holm
  Drum Programming – Ola Snortheim
  Keyboards – Espen Beranek Holm
  Flute – Torstein Kvenås
  Acoustic Guitar – Fredrik Sager
  Electric Guitar – Fredrik Sager
3. Eira (3:42)
  Composed By – Ola Snortheim, Espen Beranek Holm
  Arranged By – Espen Beranek Holm, Ola Snortheim
  Producers – Ola Snortheim, Espen Beranek Holm
  Drum Programming – Ola Snortheim
  Keyboards – Espen Beranek Holm
  Vocals – Tora Ulstrup
  Flute – Torstein Kvenås
  Acoustic Guitar – Fredrik Sager
4. Gry (3:34)
  Composed By – Ola Snortheim, Espen Beranek Holm
  Arranged By – Espen Beranek Holm, Ola Snortheim
  Producers – Ola Snortheim, Espen Beranek Holm
  Drum Programming – Ola Snortheim
  Keyboards – Espen Beranek Holm
  Flute – Torstein Kvenås
5. Pillarguri (3:20)
  Composed By – Ola Snortheim, Espen Beranek Holm
  Arranged By – Espen Beranek Holm, Ola Snortheim
  Producers – Ola Snortheim, Espen Beranek Holm
  Drum Programming – Ola Snortheim
  Keyboards – Espen Beranek Holm
  Trombone – Synnøve Hannisdal
  Acoustic Guitar – Fredrik Sager
6. Hildring (3:35)
  Composed By – Ola Snortheim, Espen Beranek Holm
  Arranged By – Espen Beranek Holm, Ola Snortheim
  Producers – Ola Snortheim, Espen Beranek Holm
  Drum Programming – Ola Snortheim
  Keyboards – Espen Beranek Holm
  Violin – Odd Hannisdals
  Flute – Torstein Kvenåss
  Trombone – Synnøve Hannisdal
7. Sval Vidde (3:58)
  Composed By – Ola Snortheim, Espen Beranek Holm
  Arranged By – Espen Beranek Holm, Ola Snortheim
  Producers – Ola Snortheim, Espen Beranek Holm
  Drum Programming – Ola Snortheim
  Keyboards – Espen Beranek Holm
  Violin – Odd Hannisdal
  Flute – Torstein Kvenås
  Trombone – Synnøve Hannisdal
  Electric Guitar – Fredrik Sager
8. Varsling (2:33)
  Composed By – Ola Snortheim, Espen Beranek Holm
  Arranged By – Espen Beranek Holm, Ola Snortheim
  Producers – Ola Snortheim, Espen Beranek Holm
  Drum Programming – Ola Snortheim
  Keyboards – Espen Beranek Holm
  Flute – Torstein Kvenås
  Electric Guitar – Fredrik Sager
9. Dovrehall (3:01)
  Composed By – Ola Snortheim, Espen Beranek Holm
  Arranged By – Espen Beranek Holm, Ola Snortheim
  Producers – Ola Snortheim, Espen Beranek Holm
  Drum Programming – Ola Snortheim
  Keyboards – Espen Beranek Holm
  Hardingfele – Magne Hesjevoll
  Flute – Torstein Kvenås
  Accordion – Harald Velsand
  Electric Guitar – Fredrik Sager
10. Rimfrost (2:56)
  Composed By – Ola Snortheim, Espen Beranek Holm
  Arranged By – Espen Beranek Holm, Ola Snortheim
  Producers – Ola Snortheim, Espen Beranek Holm
  Drum Programming – Ola Snortheim
  Keyboards – Espen Beranek Holm
  Trombone – Synnøve Hannisdal
  Electric Guitar – Fredrik Sager
11. Troll (3:06)
  Composed By – Ola Snortheim, Espen Beranek Holm
  Arranged By – Espen Beranek Holm, Ola Snortheim
  Producers – Ola Snortheim, Espen Beranek Holm
  Drum Programming – Ola Snortheim
  Keyboards – Espen Beranek Holm
  Flute – Torstein Kvenås
  Trombone – Synnøve Hannisdal
  Electric Guitar – Fredrik Sager
12. Fanteladden (2:59)
  Composed By – Ola Snortheim, Espen Beranek Holm
  Arranged By – Espen Beranek Holm, Ola Snortheim
  Producers – Ola Snortheim, Espen Beranek Holm
  Drum Programming – Ola Snortheim
  Keyboards – Espen Beranek Holm
  Violin – Odd Hannisdal
  Flute – Torstein Kvenås
  Acoustic Guitar – Fredrik Sager
13. Brudemarsj Frå Vågå (3:47)
  Composed By – Ola Snortheim, Espen Beranek Holm
  Arranged By – Espen Beranek Holm, Ola Snortheim
  Producers – Ola Snortheim, Espen Beranek Holm
  Drum Programming – Ola Snortheim
  Keyboards – Espen Beranek Holm
  Vocals – Tora Ulstrup
  Langeleik – Olav Snortheim

== Credits ==
- Drum Programming, Drums – Ola Snortheim
- Keyboards, Synthesizers – Espen Beranek Holm
- Programming – Espen Beranek Holm
- Sequencing – Ola Snortheim, Espen Beranek Holm
- Mixed By – Ola Snortheim, Espen Beranek Holm
- Cover Photo – Rolf Sørensen, Jørn Bøhmer, Sóley Sveinsdottir
- Cover Layout – Harald Lervik
- Other – Hagström Musikk A/S

Guest musicians: Olav Snortheim; langeleik. Tora Ulstrup; vocals. Magne Hesjevoll; hardanger fiddle. Odd Hannisdal; violin. Torstein Kvenås; flute. Synnøve Hannisdal; trombone. Harald Velsand; Accordion. Fredrik Sager; guitars.
