= Morgan Lindstrøm =

Morgan Lindstrøm (born 29 April 1956 in Oslo) is a Norwegian artist, composer, and synthesizer-performer.

Lindstrøm was a member of the synth-duo Langsomt Mot Nord during their "Westrveg" period.

His style has been described as "... rock propelled with influences from Norwegian folk and classical music, the synth work sometimes taking on the Michael Garrison wall-of-sound feel, with the finesse of early Vangelis".

Before Langsomt Mot Nord, Lindstrøm was a member of the band "Ixi". Ixi participated on a record released by NRK radio in 1982, containing the chosen bands from "Ungdommens Radioavis Rockemønstring", a competition of upcoming bands. Ixi was later seen in the renowned Club 7 in Oslo.

He is the brother of another Norwegian artist, Rune Lindstrøm of deLillos.

In 2007 Lindstøm started an electropop-band called SoulSheen, with Kaja Norum (lead vocals), Madeleine Schee (vocals) and Mikjel Helmers and Lindstrøm on synthesizers. The band have websites on http://www.soulsheen.com/ and http://www.myspace.com/soulsheen.

Lindstrøm have produced remixes under the alias Morganix for the Norwegian electronica-groups Schnodig, Substaat (2016) and Electro Spectre (2018), in partnership with singer Kjersti Helene Larsen.

Lindstrøm also contributed with a remix of the track "Lala Land" by the Norwegian Gothic Rock band "Batboner" on the band's "Re-Organ-Ized" album, released in 2024.

== Sources in Norwegian ==
- Morgan G. Lindstrøm Rockipedia
