= Westrveg =

Studio album by Langsomt Mot Nord
- Released: 1988
- Producer: CBS

Westrveg. The second of three albums by the Norwegian synth-duo Langsomt Mot Nord.

Label: CBS

Record No: CBS 461165 2

Release year: 1988

Musicians: Ola Snortheim; drums, sequencing. Morgan Lindstrøm; keyboards, programming.

Guest musicians: Olav Snortheim; bukkehorn. Knut Buen; hardanger fiddle (hardingfele). Brynjar Hoff; oboe. Steinar Ofsdal; willow flute. Carl Anders Sponberg; violin. Atle Sponberg; violin. Eva Knardahl; grand piano. Jon Eberson; guitars.

Producers: Snortheim/Lindstrøm.

Technicians: Anders Lind, Jan Erik Kongshaug, Øystein Boassen.

Recording locations: Silence Studio, Rainbow Studio

== Tracks ==
1. Westrveg (3:10)
  Arranged By – Morgan Lindstrøm, Ola Snortheim
  Composed By – Ola Snortheim, Morgan Lindstrøm
  Drum Programming – Ola Snortheim
  Hardingfele – Knut Buen
  Keyboards – Morgan Lindstrøm
  Producer – Ola Snortheim, Morgan Lindstrøm
  Violin – Atle Sponberg
2. Gufsi Fraa Fjellom (3:53)
  Arranged By – Morgan Lindstrøm, Ola Snortheim
  Composed By – Ola Snortheim, Traditional
  Drum Programming – Ola Snortheim
  Electric Guitar – Jon Eberson
  Hardingfele – Knut Buen
  Keyboards – Morgan Lindstrøm
  Producer – Ola Snortheim, Morgan Lindstrøm
  Violin – Carl Anders Sponberg
3. Tirilith (2:54)
  Arranged By – Morgan Lindstrøm, Ola Snortheim
  Composed By – Ola Snortheim, Morgan Lindstrøm
  Drum Programming – Ola Snortheim
  Keyboards – Morgan Lindstrøm
  Oboe – Brynjar Hoff
  Percussion – Ola Snortheim
  Producer – Ola Snortheim, Morgan Lindstrøm
  Violin – Atle Sponberg
4. Gjetarlåter Fra Valdres Og Gudbrandsdal (3:12)
  Arranged By – Morgan Lindstrøm, Ola Snortheim
  Bukkehorn – Olav Snortheim
  Composed By – Traditional
  Electric Guitar – Jon Eberson
  Keyboards – Morgan Lindstrøm
  Percussion – Ola Snortheim
  Producer – Ola Snortheim, Morgan Lindstrøm
5. Euryanthe (3:51)
  Arranged By – Morgan Lindstrøm, Ola Snortheim
  Composed By – Morgan Lindstrøm, Ola Snortheim
  Drum Programming – Ola Snortheim
  Electric Guitar – Jon Eberson
  Keyboards – Morgan Lindstrøm
  Producer – Ola Snortheim, Morgan Lindstrøm
6. Sibilja (3:08)
  Arranged By – Morgan Lindstrøm, Ola Snortheim
  Composed By – Ola Snortheim, Morgan Lindstrøm
  Drum Programming – Ola Snortheim
  Keyboards – Morgan Lindstrøm
  Oboe – Brynjar Hoff
  Percussion – Ola Snortheim
  Producer – Ola Snortheim, Morgan Lindstrøm
  Violin – Atle Sponberg
7. Seljespretten (4:22)
  Arranged By – Morgan Lindstrøm, Ola Snortheim
  Composed By – Traditional
  Drum Programming – Ola Snortheim
  Electric Guitar – Jon Eberson
  Grand Piano – Eva Knardahl
  Keyboards – Morgan Lindstrøm
  Percussion – Ola Snortheim
  Producer – Ola Snortheim, Morgan Lindstrøm
  Willow Flute – Steinar Ofsdal
8. Fäbodpsalm (3:56)
  Arranged By – Morgan Lindstrøm, Ola Snortheim
  Composed By – Traditional
  Drum Programming – Ola Snortheim
  Keyboards – Morgan Lindstrøm
  Oboe – Brynjar Hoff
  Producer – Ola Snortheim, Morgan Lindstrøm
  Violin – Atle Sponberg
9. Naglet Til Et Kors Paa Jorden (2:33)
  Arranged By – Morgan Lindstrøm, Ola Snortheim
  Bukkehorn – Olav Snortheim
  Composed By – Traditional
  Keyboards – Morgan Lindstrøm
  Producer – Ola Snortheim, Morgan Lindstrøm
10. Faërie (1:54)
  Arranged By – Morgan Lindstrøm, Ola Snortheim
  Composed By – Ola Snortheim
  Keyboards – Morgan Lindstrøm
  Percussion – Ola Snortheim
  Producer – Ola Snortheim, Morgan Lindstrøm
  Violin – Atle Sponberg
11. Heksesabbat (3:56)
  Arranged By – Morgan Lindstrøm, Ola Snortheim
  Composed By – Ola Snortheim
  Drum Programming – Ola Snortheim
  Electric Guitar – Jon Eberson
  Keyboards – Morgan Lindstrøm
  Producer – Ola Snortheim, Morgan Lindstrøm
12. Nordafjølls (2:47)
  Arranged By – Morgan Lindstrøm, Ola Snortheim
  Composed By – Traditional
  Electric Guitar – Jon Eberson
  Hardingfele – Knut Buen
  Keyboards – Morgan Lindstrøm
  Percussion – Ola Snortheim
  Producer – Ola Snortheim, Morgan Lindstrøm
  Willow Flute – Steinar Ofsdal
13. Gjallarhorne (4:06)
  Arranged By – Morgan Lindstrøm, Ola Snortheim
  Composed By – Ola Snortheim
  Drum Programming – Ola Snortheim
  Keyboards – Morgan Lindstrøm
  Producer – Ola Snortheim, Morgan Lindstrøm

== Credits ==
- Drum Programming, Drums – Ola Snortheim
- Keyboards, Synthesizers – Morgan Lindstrøm
- Programming – Morgan Lindstrøm
- Sampling – Morgan Lindstrøm, Ola Snortheim
- Sequencing – Ola Snortheim
- Sounds – Jørn Christensen
- Voice – Alice Bostrøm (tracks: 1, 11, 13), Eli Storbekken (tracks: 4), Ola Snortheim (tracks: 13)
- Technician – Anders Lind, Jan Erik Kongshaug, Øystein Boassen
- Mixed By – Anders Lind
- Illustration – Ida Vigerust Snortheim
- Cover Photo – Davis Hiser
- Liner Notes – Rannveig Snortheim
- Layout – Ola Snortheim
- Musical Assistance – Terje Wiik, Torstein Kvenås
- Other – AKAI/Norsk Musikk, Anders Sevaldson, Bjørn Melby, Digital-fabriken, Eva & Henrik, Jan Erik Andersen, Pro-Technic A/S, Sóley Sveinsdottir

== Sources in Norwegian ==
- Langsomt Mot Nord Wikipedia
- Westrveg (1988) Rockipedia
