= Langsomt Mot Nord =

- Origin: Norway
- Genres: Synth
- Members: Ola Snortheim
- Past members: Jørn Christensen; Morgan Lindstrøm; Espen Beranek Holm
- Website: www.langsomtmotnord.no

Langsomt Mot Nord (en: Slowly Approaching the North or alternatively Slowly Northward) is a Norwegian synth-duo, founded by rock-drummer Ola Snortheim. Snortheim a well-known rock drummer of the Norwegian scene in the 1980s and 1990s, and he played in bands with Blaupunkt, De Press and Circus Modern.

Langsomt Mot Nord has released three albums to date.

== Live performances ==
Despite releasing three albums, Langsomt Mot Nord has only performed live a few times.

They appeared at the TopPop program at NRK TV during the release of Westrveg. The show was recorded at the Rockefeller Music Hall in Oslo, featuring Steinar Ofsdal, Eva Knardahl and Atle Sponberg. During the Westrveg-period, LMN's use of sampling-technology was on its peak: In the TopPop-performance, one could count no less than seven S series Akai samplers stacked on top of each other near the middle of the stage. This was somewhat unusual at the time, and the group's extensive use of samplers and computers in their works based on Norwegian traditional music was debated in Norwegian media for some time.

During the release of Hildring, they appeared at the Rock On Top Of Europe festival in Hammerfest and afterwards did a few gigs: Among them, one at the Student Society in Trondheim, featuring deLillos, Raga Rockers and Langsomt Mot Nord, and one at the Rockefeller Music Hall in Oslo, in company with "Fläskkvartetten" (Fleshquartet), Stengte Dører and Einmal Kommt die Liebe.

The group released a music video, for the tune "Ola Drar Til Myklagard" starring Lars Lillo-Stenberg, promoting their first album, Langsomt mot Nord.

== Musical style ==
The music of Langsomt Mot Nord (LMN) is derived from Norwegian traditional music. Many of the recordings are based upon older recordings of traditional tunes, performed on original instruments by Ola Snortheim's father, the folk-musician Olav Snortheim. The music is accentuated and arranged in new ways by extensive use of electronic instruments like synthesizers and samplers. However, the band also takes the traditional music in new directions by the use of acoustic instruments, such as strings, piano and woodwind.

== Personnel ==
Each album by Langsomt Mot Nord has featured a different line up.

Snortheim recorded the first album, Langsomt mot Nord along with Norwegian musician/producer Jørn Christensen, the guitarist with bands such as De Press, Circus Modern and Can Can. Christensen is also known as a record producer, and has produced for Norwegian bands such as deLillos and CC Cowboys.

The second album, Westrveg, was recorded by Snortheim in company with Morgan Lindstrøm. Lindstrøm, a synthesizer performer and composer, and is the brother of Rune Lindstrøm, drummer of deLillos.

The third album, Hildring, was recorded with Espen Beranek Holm, who was known as a pop artist from albums including Trigger, where he performed vocal and multi-instrumental parts. Holm has also played in some well-known bands, such as Spastisk Ekstase.

== Discography ==
- Langsomt Mot Nord (1985)
- Westrveg (1988)
- Hildring (1991)
