= Osten (disambiguation) =

Osten is a municipality in the district of Cuxhaven, in Lower Saxony, Germany.

Osten may also refer to:

- Osten (surname)
- Osten (Macedonian magazine), humor weekly
- Östen, semi-legendary king of Sweden
- Östen (name)

== See also ==
- Øystein, Norwegian given name
- Østen, Scandinavian given name
