= Beckstrom =

Beckstrom or Beckstrøm is a surname. Notable people with the surname include:

- Lars Fredrik Beckstrøm (born 1960), Norwegian musician
- Rod Beckstrom (born 1961), American author, high-tech entrepreneur, and non-profit executive

== See also ==
- Beckstrom's law
- Backstrom, another surname
