= Andrzej Dziubek =

Polish musician

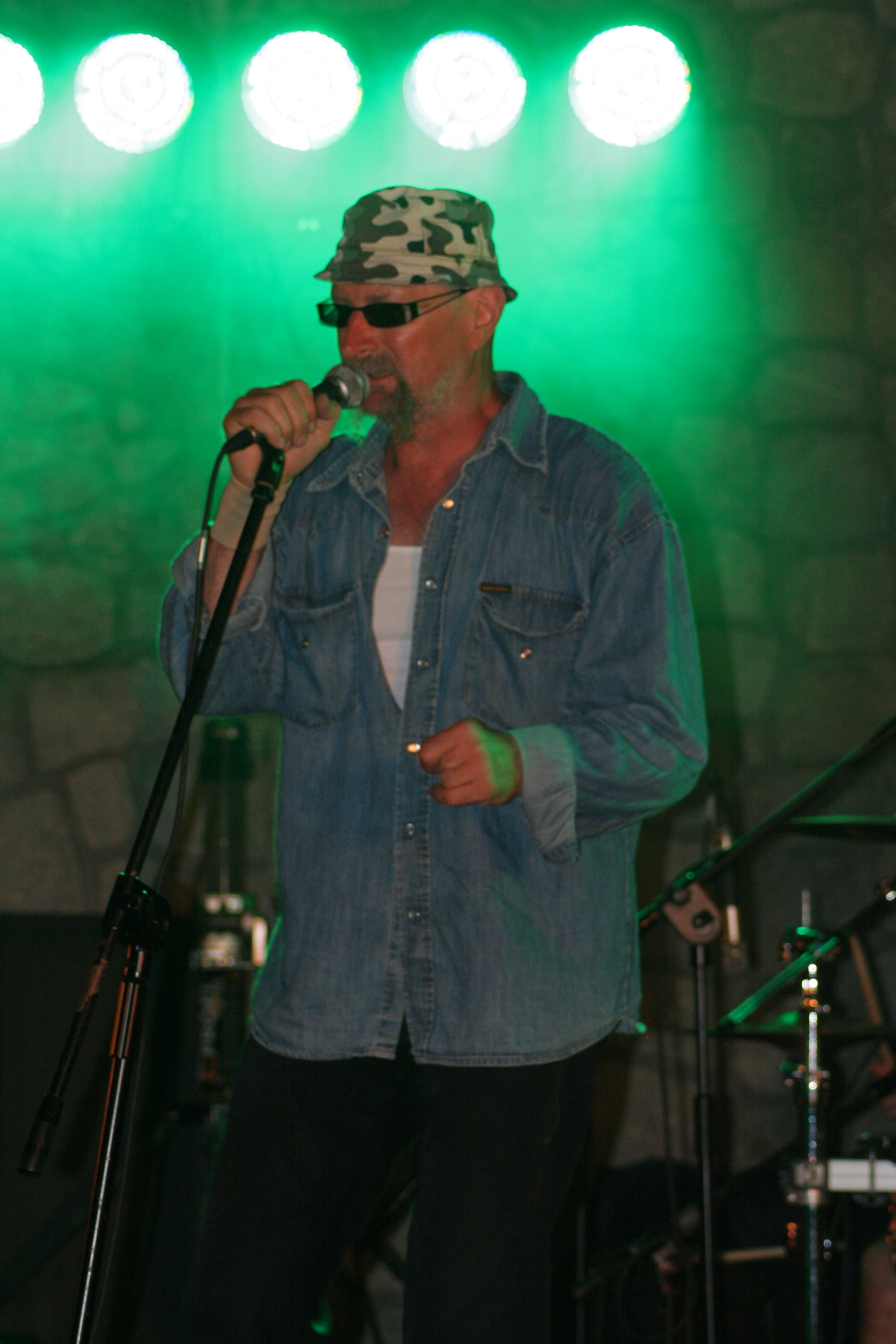
Andrzej Dziubek during concert in 2009 in Łeba

Andrzej Paweł Dziubek (Norwegian: Andrej Nebb; born 14 June 1954) is a Polish musician and vocalist, founder and only constant member of the Polish-Norwegian rock group De Press.

Dziubek was born in Jabłonka, Lesser Poland Voivodeship, Orawa, Poland. He had been involved in music since early childhood, first as a member of Małe Podhale folk ensemble. In high school he founded his first band, Lotony. As a teenager he emigrated (illegally) to Austria, through communist Czechoslovakia. His final destination was Norway, where he began studying at The National Academy of Craft and Art Industry (now Kunsthøgskolen i Oslo) and later had his name legally changed to Andrej Nebb. It was at that time that he founded Pull Out, a punk rock group. In the following years he studied at The National Academy of Fine Arts (now Kunsthøgskolen i Oslo). In 1980 together with Jørn Christensen and Ola Snortheim he founded his most prominent project, De Press. Later he was also involved in an experimental group called Holy Toy.

Apart from being a skilled musician Andrzej is also a painter and an experimental performer. He exhibits his art in his own gallery in Oslo, and occasionally also in Germany and Poland.

He started living in Hvalstad, Norway in the 1970s.

Political views: in December 2022, he told media that his Christmas wish is peace in Ukraine, and "Advances and good fight for the Ukrainian forces in their fight against Putin".
