= Hjernen er alene =

Studio album by deLillos
- Released: 1989
- Recorded: Athletic Sound, Halden
- Genre: Rock
- Label: Sonet
- Producer: deLillos and Jørn Christensen

DeLillos chronology
| Før var det morsomt med sne (1987) | Hjernen er alene (1989) | Svett smil (1990) |

Hjernen er alene (English: The Brain is Alone) is the third studio album by Norwegian rock band deLillos. The LP version had a bonus track, not found on the CD release, called "Utkaster" (bouncer).

== Track listing ==
1. "Fastesangen"
2. "Vår"
3. "Sveve over byen"
4. "Snill og smart"
5. "Triste dager"
6. "Balladen om Kåre og Nelly"
7. "Jenter fra en liten plass"
8. "Mine peanøtter er ikke gode"
9. "Skulle bare være morsom"
10. "Woo doo"
11. "Utkaster (LP only bonus-track)"
12. "Parkanlegg her"
13. "Tikk takk"
14. "Venter på telefon"
15. "Rendez-vous"
16. "Lebestift"
17. "Hjernen er alene"
18. "Den feite mannen"
19. "Mørke Mathilde"
20. "Soppesmørbrød"
21. "Kunstig og kulørt"
22. "Mantra"
23. "Hva har du tenkt"

== Chart performance ==
| Chart (1989) | Peak position |
|---|---|
| Norwegian Albums (VG-lista) | 4 |
