= Ym:Stammen =

Norwegian post-punk band

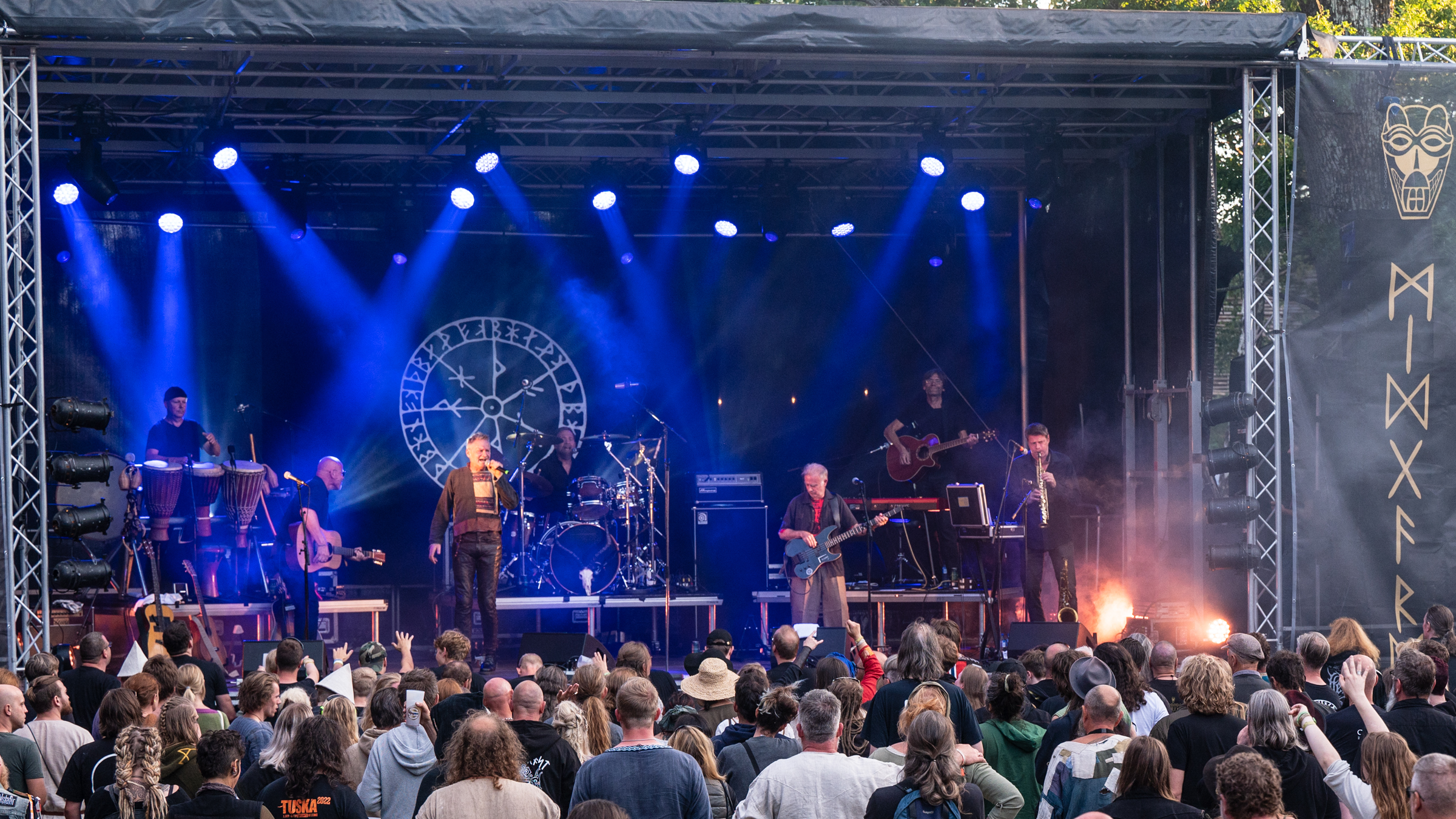
Ym:Stammen at Midgardsblot in 2022

Ym:Stammen was a folk-influenced post-punk band from Oslo, Norway, active in the period 1983–1999. The name refers to Ymir from Norse mythology and can be interpreted as “the tribe of Ymir,” or “humanity.”

The music was a mix of Norse-inspired chanting and primitive rock, with some pop elements. They labeled their music as "Nordic stomp," with Mathiesen’s hysterical lyrics influenced by philosophy, religion, and surrealism.

== History ==
The group was founded in 1983 by Trygve Mathiesen. After several lineup changes, the album Dvergmål was released in 1987, marking a shift away from strict minimalism toward a more complex expression incorporating elements of rock, folk, ritualistic motifs, and the avant-garde.

The band toured Northern Europe and Canada throughout the 1980s and 1990s, and released six albums. They represented Norway during the 1,000th anniversary celebrations of Dublin, Ireland, where they performed several concerts in late July 1987. They were official representatives of Norway, funded by the Ministry of Foreign Affairs of Norway.

They gave their last performance on midsummer night in 1999 in Oslo. In August 2022, Ym:Stammen played a reunion concert at the Norwegian metal festival Midgardsblot in Borre.

Three of the members also played in the band Dog Age.

== Members ==
- Trygve Mathiesen – vocals (1983–1999, 2022)
- Christopher Nielsen – Indian banjo (1983)
- Torgeir Tunhold-Hanssen – drums (1983)
- Trygve Johansen – synth (1983)
- Tore Halland – guitar (1983)
- Oddvar Karlsmyr – drums, vocals, guitar (1984–89)
- Anne Grete Kolås – drums, vocals, flute (1984)
- Dag-Olav Sivertsen – guitar, percussion, vocals (1985–86)
- Harald Beckstrøm – guitar, bass (1987–89) – also with Dog Age
- Jon Anders Strand – bass, guitar (1987–89) – also with Dog Age
- Christian Refsum – drums (1987–89) – also with Dog Age
- Paul Arvid Jørgensen – synth (1987–89)
- Jo Langeland – guitar, vocals (1989–99) dead 2021
- Andreas Eriksen – percussion (1989–94, 2022) – also touring with Bel Canto
- Tarjei Rønnow – bass (1991–94)
- Øyvind Rauset – fiddle (1991–94)
- Kai Lundewall – drums (1991–99, 2022)
- Torstein Kvenaas – flutes (1991–93)
- Are Hofstad – saxophones (1992–93)
- Torben Snekkestad – saxophones (1994–96, 2022)
- Douglas Alexandre – bass (1995–99, 2022)
- Tore Ylvisaker – synth (1995–99) – also known from Ulver (1998–2024), dead 2024
- Morten Lund – gitar, live (2022)

== Discography ==
=== Albums ===
- Overvintrende, Likvidér LIKV 4009, 1984 (MC-30)
- I Vi-landet, Likvidér LIKV 4021, 1984 (MC-30)
- Dvergmål, Cicada C010, 1987 (LP)
- Enøyd, Tatra TATCD 006, 1992 (CD, LP, MC)
- Dvergmål, Tatra TAT 011, 1993 (rerelease with 10 bonus tracks, CD)
- Ulv! Ulv!, Grappa GRCD 4059, 1994 (CD)
- Guden-i-Steinen, Grappa GRCD 4117, 1997 (CD)

=== Singles ===
- "Solbeven/Alle Myter", 7-inch, Transmission TR 02, 1987
- "Overkjørt av Hjul og Vogn/Splid", 7-inch, Tatra TAT 005, 1991
- "Endelig (Har Tingene Funnet Sin Form)/Synge Gjør Vi (ikke For å Glemme vår Sorg Men) For å Styrke Vår Tro", CDS Grappa GRCDS 145, 1993
- "(Vi Blir) Fisk/Solbeven", CDS Grappa GRCDS 148, 1994
- "Ym-stammen Hevner Geronimo" – Hevnerkvadet (Radio San Carlo-Reservatet-mix/Hevnerkvadet (bakholdsangrep-mix)/Hevnerkvadet (Slå til før daggry-mix), Remixes by DJ Geronimo, CDS Grappa GRCDS 153, 1994 (unreleased)
- "Tusen Års Fortielse" – (Tusenårsmix/Rottefangerversjonen/Versjon for verdensånden/Millenium-mix), bonus: live Roskilde-festival 1994: Budbringere/Styrke Vår Tro/Navnet-Overvintr, CDS Grappa GRCDS 153, 1995
- "Store Aleksander", Promo single Grappa GRCDS 164, 1997
- "Store Aleksander" (Taxi-mix)/Beherske Verden (Myggen-mix)/Store Aleksander (album-versjon)/Store Aleksander (Kjøkken-versjon), CDS Grappa GRCDS 169, 1997
- "Ym-stammen meets Mel Simpson – Guden-i-Steinen: the remix" (Radio-edit Cheeky-mix/Sneaky-mix/Cheeky-mix/album-versjon), Remixes by Mel Simpson (from Us3), CDS Grappa GRCDS 181, 1997
