= Josefsen =

Josefsen is a surname. Notable people with the surname include:

- Annelise Josefsen (born 1949), Norwegian-Sami artist
- Øystein Josefsen (born 1944), Norwegian businessman and politician
- Turi Josefsen (born 1936), Norwegian-American businesswoman
