= Lundevall =

Lundevall is a surname. Notable people with the surname include:

- Hugo Lundevall (1892–1949), Swedish swimmer
- Lars Lundevall, Norwegian musician
- Simon Lundevall (born 1988), Swedish footballer
- Svein Lundevall (born 1944), Norwegian civil servant
