= Silence Studio =

Swedish recording studio

Silence Studio is a Swedish recording studio in the small town of Koppom, owned by recording-technician/producer Anders Lind. The studio has been the location of many recordings of Swedish and Norwegian artists. This is an incomplete list of examples.

- The Anti-music Bonanza
- Atomic Swing
- Beranek
- Bergman Rock
- Bob Hund
- Bobbysocks
- Camouflage
- The Creeps
- Charta 77
- Cloudberry Jam
- Chateau Neuf Spelemän
- Dag Vag
- Dia Psalma
- Dom Lyckliga Kompisarna
- Dronning Mauds Land
- Eldkvarn
- Ebba Grön
- Fläskkvartetten
- Figurines
- Finn Kalvik
- Fint Tillsammans
- Fidget
- First Floor Power
- Green
- Grisen Skriker
- Hassangänget
- Hardy Nilsson
- Hedningarna
- Hell on Wheels
- Hellacopters
- Jannicke
- Kent
- Kai Martin & Stick!
- Lars Hug
- Langsomt Mot Nord
- Loosegoats
- Matchstick Sun
- Monroes
- Nina Persson & Niklas Frisk
- Nikolaj Nørlund
- Olle Ljungström
- Per Cussion
- Popsicle
- Return
- Reperbahn
- Robert Broberg
- Scatterbrain
- Stefan Sundström
- Sigge Hills
- Sophie Zelmani
- Speaker
- Svenne Rubins
- Stillborn
- Thomas Di Leva
- Trond Granlund
- Joakim Thåström
- Traste Lindéns Kvintett
- Toms Tivoli
- Union Carbide Productions
- Urban Turban
- Urga
- Wannadies
- Whipped Cream
- Wild Rovers
