= Matchstick Sun =

- Origin: Oslo, Norway
- Genres: Rock
- Years active: 1984–1991
- Labels: RCA; Temptation

Matchstick Sun was a Norwegian rock band, formed in 1984. In their first four years they were part of the Oslo underground scene, and in their last three years of existence, they released two albums on a major record label, won a Spellemannprisen (the Norwegian equivalent of a Grammy), but then broke up.

== Band members ==
- Ivar Eidem – lead vocals & keyboards
- Rolf Recknagel – guitar & vocals
- Rune Annaniassen – bass guitar
- Geir “Bulle” Underdal – drums

=== Associated members ===
- Truls Jedemo – keyboards (1988–1991)
- Bjørn Hemsen – guitar (1990–1991)

== Formation ==
Matchstick Sun was founded in 1984, as the Diamond Dogs by four key players of the Oslo post punk scene. Their drummer Bulle (born 1962) had been in the punk group, Betong Hysteria, and the art/ska band, Løver og tigre (Lions & Tigers). The vocalist, Eidem (born 1964), and the bassist Annaniassen (born 1959) had both been in the last edition of The Cut. The guitarist, and main songwriter, Rolf Recknagel (born 1952) had for a short while been in De Press.

== Going overground ==
By the spring of 1988, the band's reputation had grown and, just prior to releasing their first record, a three-song single on the independent record label Temptation, they renamed themselves Matchstick Sun, after the title of one of their own songs. They signed to BMG Ariola the following year, and they and their record producer, Knut Bohn, headed for Silence, a residential recording studio. The founder and house engineer, Anders Lind, worked well with Bohn and Matchstick Sun, and managed to get their mellotron in working order.

In June 1989, Matchstick Sun attended the New Music Seminar in Manhattan, New York, United States, and some attention in the Norwegian press. Their debut album, Flowerground, was released in August 1989. Their efforts were rewarded with a Spellemannprisen for Best New Act.

== Itchy Bitchy ==
Matchstick Sun’s second album, Itchy Bitchy, was released in 1990. The critics were again enthusiastic, but both airplay and sales were disappointing compared to the first album. Matchstick Sun was invited to the annual EBU Rock Festival: a three-day event organized by the European Broadcasting Union in Cork in Ireland and aired by public service radio stations all over Europe.

However, their drummer, Bulle, quit in January 1991, and the group quickly disbanded. Bulle kept on playing with The Lust-O-Rama (1989–93), the garage rock band he had started with vocalist Arne Thelin from The Cosmic Dropouts after they met at the New Music Seminar in New York in 1989. Their only album, Twenty-Six Screams, was released in 1990.

Guitarist and songwriter Rolf Recknagel quickly put together a new band called Yeahlove Swans (1991–94). Their only album, Lovetech, was released by Polygram in 1992. Bass player Rune Annaniassen joined Sister Rain in 1992, which disbanded shortly after having released The Neptun Tapes in 1993. He later joined Merchants of Venus (1993–94) whose one album Wish Across the Land was released by WEA in 1994. Vocalist Ivar Eidem released his one solo album Missions of a Clown in 1996 on Oh Yeah!, and was awarded the Norwegian Grammy for Best Male Artist.

== Discography ==
=== Albums ===
- Flowerground (RCA 1989)
- Itchy Bitchy (RCA 1990)

=== Singles ===
- ”You and Me” b/w “Bumblebee” / “Candy Man” - (Temptation 1988)
- ”Matchstick Sun” b/w “Flowerground” -( RCA 1989)
- “It's Just a Matter” b/w “Too Many Girls” - (RCA 1989)
- ”Mr. Powerman” b/w “Modern World” - (RCA 1990)
