= Are Kalvø =

Norwegian writer and satirist

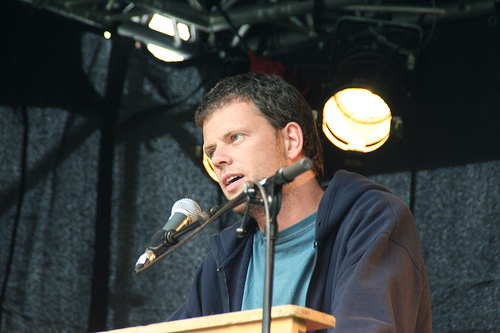
- Born: 31 December 1969 (age 56)

Are Kalvø (born 31 December 1969) is a Norwegian writer and satirist.

He was born in Stranda Municipality. His debut work as writer was Absolutt Oslo, released in 1994. Later satirical books were Kunsten å vere neger (1996), Men fjernkontrollen min får du aldri (1997), Harry (1999), Bibelen 2 (2002, with Steffen Kverneland), Syden (2002) and Våre venner kinesarane (2007). His first work as a fiction writer was Nød, released in 2004. He writes in Nynorsk.

He wrote the revues 1000 år og like blid (1998, with Ragnar Hovland), and Det folk vil ha (2005). Both premiered at Det Norske Teatret. He was also one of the main participants in the satiric radio program Hallo i uken in NRK P2 until the summer of 2009, together with Espen Beranek Holm and Else Michelet.
