= Østen =

Østen is a Scandinavian male given name.

People named Østen include:

- Østen Kjørn (1727–1805), Norwegian woodcarver
- Østen Østensen (1878–1939), Norwegian competitive shooter
- Østen Bergøy, Norwegian singer

== See also ==
- Osten (disambiguation)
- Östen
- Øystein
