= Rune Lindstrøm =

- Born: Rune Peder Lindstrøm; March 2, 1964 (age 62); Oslo, Norway
- Origin: Oslo
- Instrument: Drums

Rune Peder Lindstrøm (born 2 March 1963) was the original drummer for the Norwegian rock-band deLillos (1984–1985). He left in 1985 and returned in 2006, thus reforming the band to their original lineup.

Rune Lindstrøm is the principal song writer for "Lys", one of the songs in the Norwegian finale for the Eurovision Song Contest of 1997. The song was performed by the artist Manjari. It was released by Virgin Records as a promotion-CD only. The quality and originality of the song has made it one of the most sought-after objects among Eurovision fans.

Rune Lindstrøm was a member of the Norwegian band Blister in 2003 and performed on the album Brand New Antiques.

Rune Lindstrøm is the brother of Morgan Lindstrøm of the synth-duo Langsomt Mot Nord.

== Sources in Norwegian ==
- Rune Lindstrøm Wikipedia
- Rune Lindstrøm Rockipedia
