= Christian Refsum =

Norwegian literary scholar and writer

- Born: October 8, 1962 (age 63)
- Occupations: Literary scholar, poet and novelist

Christian Refsum (born 8 October 1962) is a Norwegian literary scholar, poet and novelist. He is full professor of literature at the University of Oslo.

== Biography ==
He earned his doctorate with a dissertation on Nordic and French symbolism from the last half of the 19th century. He made his fiction debut in 2001 with the short story collection Transport. He has previously played in rock bands such as And the Balcony Fell, Ym:Stammen and Dog Age. He was also editor of the Norwegian encyclopedia of literature, Litteraturvitenskapelig leksikon. In 2007 the published the university novel Ingen vitner for vitnet, that "weaves a crime narrative rooted in university life."

In 2022 he was awarded Universitetsforlaget's Nordic academic prize (Årets tidsskriftartikkel), that aims to recognise the best scholarship that is published in the Nordic countries, for his article on Karl Ove Knausgård's book Spring.

== Bibliography ==
- 1997 – Litteraturvitenskapelig leksikon (editor). Oslo: Kunnskapsforlaget.
- 2000 – En verden av oversettelse. Oslo: Unipub.
- 2001 – Transport. Short stories. Oslo: Tiden.
- 2003 – offbeat/nye dager. Poetry. Oslo: Oktober.
- 2003 – Lyrikkens liv. (With Christian Janss) Oslo: Universitetsforlaget.
- 2004 – Kyssing og slåssing. (With Eivind Røssaak) Oslo: Pax.
- 2007 – Ingen vitner for vitnet. Novel. Oktober.
- 2007 – Litteraturvitenskapelig leksikon. Revised edition. Oslo: Kunnskapsforlaget.
- 2010 – Løftet. Novel. Oktober.
- 2012 – Kåte dikt. Poetry. Oktober.
- 2016 – Kjærlighet som religion. Lidenskap og lengsel i film og litteratur på 2000-tallet. Universitetsforlaget.
