= Isak Rypdal =

Background information
- Also known as: Dr No, Disco Valente, Freeloader
- Origin: Oslo, Norway
- Genres: Electropop, house music, film score
- Website: crabkey.no

Isak Rypdal (born 1971) is a Norwegian music producer and founder of Crab Key Records. He has released numerous albums and singles and has contributed on several Norwegian movie scores.

== Producer career ==
Isak Rypdal came to prominence in 1999 after singing Doctor No to Warner Music Norway. The singles Lastima and La Luna written together with bandmember Bendik Gjevjon gained high rotation on nearly all Norwegian radio stations including NRK P3 for over a year. The singles also reached high on Norway's official sales chart, and for nearly two years Doctor No toured Norway with over 80 performances including playing for over 50.000 people at VG Lista Topp 20's show at Rådhusplassen, Oslo.

With the following single All For You and the album Fat Sound To The Masses, Doctor No signs a new deal with Warner Music Japan, and many other territories follows up the releases in 2001. In 2002 Isak started the new project Disco Valente released on Nice & Firm/Bonnier Music Norway. Two 8-track maxi singles were released and the debut single I See Music peaked on the official Scandinavian Dance Chart.

In 2004 Isak teams up with the Norwegian singer Hanne Romsaas and releases Freeloader - Pure Devotion on EMI Publishing Germany. The single was picked up by top DJ's such as Judge Jules who put the song on his top ten list on the BBC Radio One show. The single is compiled in excess of 750,000 units and was also included on all Samsung mobile phones in the years after. Isak Rypdal is currently working with the band Electro Spectre, and the current album Dangerous Game was suggested as the best electro pop album for 2012 by Side-Line Magazine.

== Discography ==
- 2000 Doctor No - Lastima (CD-Maxi)
- 2000 Doctor No - La Luna (CD-Maxi)
- 2001 Doctor No - Fat Sound To The Masses (Album)
- 2001 Doctor No - All For You (CD-Maxi)
- 2001 Disco Valente - I See Music (CD-Maxi)
- 2002 Doctor No - Fat Sound To The Masses (Album) (Expanded Edition)
- 2002 Disco Valente - Seen You Before (CD-Maxi)
- 2003 The Shining - Maze (CD-Maxi)
- 2003 Freeloader - Pure Devotion (CD-Maxi)
- 2003 Freeloader - Pure Devotion (Vinyl)
- 2004 Freeloader - Pure Devotion (CD Single)
- 2004 Freeloader - Two Become One (CD-Maxi)
- 2004 Freeloader - Two Become One (Vinyl)
- 2006 Freeloader - Come Dance With Me (CD-Maxi)
- 2009 Electro Spectre - Watch It All Turn (Album)
- 2010 Electro Spectre - Yet It's Love (CD-Maxi)
- 2011 Electro Spectre - Suspicious Minds (CD Single)
- 2012 Electro Spectre - Dancing Girl (CD Single)
- 2012 Electro Spectre - Dangerous Game (Album)

== Compilations ==
Judgement Sundays – Bianco Y Niegro Music UK
Godskitchen Worldwide
Sensation White Edition – Universal
Trance Nation 2003 – Ministry Of Sound
Clubbers Guide Summer 2003 – Ministry Of Sound
Karma Chillout 2002 - Ministry Of Sound
Summer Moves On 2001 - Warner. Norway
Club Nation 2002 - Ministry Of Sound
Absolute Music 31 2001 - Warner. Norway
Maximum Trance 2002 - Japan
Clubbers Guide To 2002 - Ministry Of Sound
Clubbers Guide To Ibiza 2002 - Ministry Of Sound
Trance Nation Harder – Ministry Of Sound
538 Dance Smash Hits 1 (Winter Edition)
Bodywork IV
Bodywork IX
Bodywork DVD
Clubbers Guide 2003 Finland – Ministry Of Sound
Dance Chart Vol 6 – Warner Music – Denmark
Bodywork V – Denmark
Bodywork V – Sweden
Dance N Trance vol 1 DVD
Grandmix 2004 – Sony – Netherlands
Grandmix 2003 – Sony – Italy
Absolute Dance 2003 (Move Your Body 2)
Trance The Ultimate Collection 2004 – vol 1
Trance Maniacs Party vol. 5
Pure Disco Vol 2
Mid Summer Mega Mix 2004
Sensation Black 2005
Female Vocal Club
Flächenfüller 1 – House Nation - Germany
Pure Trance 5 – Water Music – USA
Trance Divas 2 – Water Music – USA
Best Of Trance – Water Music – USA
Pure Fitness – Water Music – USA
Grand Prix Party - Universal - Norway
Ultimate Trance – Water Music – USA
Trance Anthems – Water Music – USA
Trancemaster – Zomba – Germany
Eden Ibiza
Bodywork III
Frank TRAX- Wale Music – Spain
Trance Voices vol. 21 2006
Trance Vocal Session 2007
Orbit Electro Vol. 1 2009
