= Eystein =

Eystein or Eysteinn is the name of:

- Eystein Erlendsson (d. 1188), Norwegian bishop and saint
- Eystein Halfdansson (fl. c. 730), king of Romerike and Vestfold in what is now Norway
- Eystein Haraldson (died 1157), king of Norway
- Eystein Ivarsson (d. 830) was Jarl of Oplande and Hedmark in Norway
- Eystein Magnusson (c.1088–1123), king of Norway
- Eystein Meyla (died 1177), also known as Eystein Eysteinson, Norwegian pretender
- Eysteinn, legendary Swedish king

== See also ==
- Øystein
