= Ingjald Ørbeck Sørheim =

Norwegian jurist and politician (1937–2010)

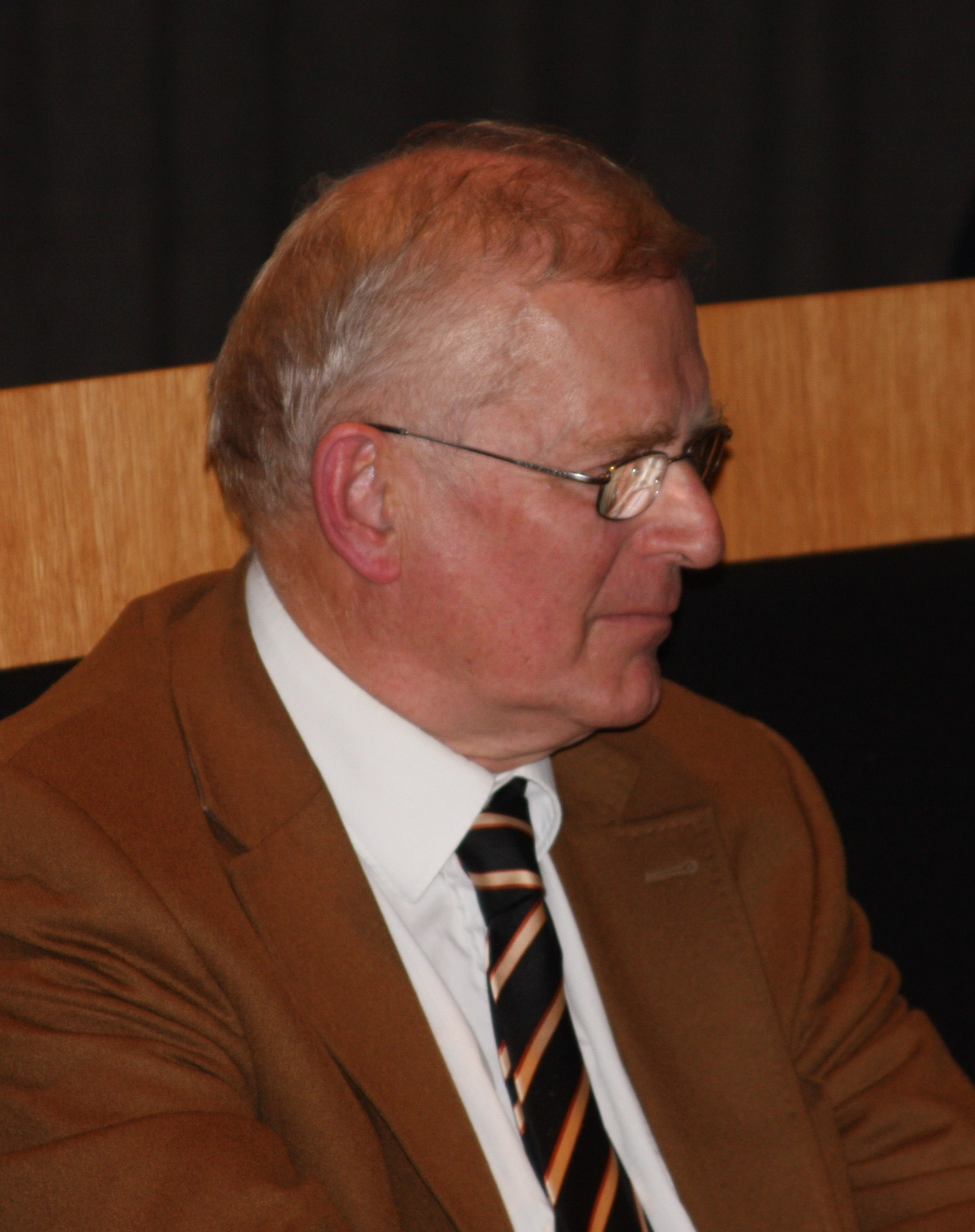
Ingjald Ørbeck Sørheim

Ingjald Ørbeck Sørheim (28 July 1937 – 18 September 2010) was a Norwegian jurist and politician for the Labour Party.

He was born in Lena. After moving to Oslo in 1952 he finished his secondary education at Grefsen in 1956, he studied Russian language in the Norwegian military, and in 1960 at the Moscow State University. He then graduated from the University of Oslo with the cand.jur. degree in 1965. He was a research assistant in 1964, secretary for the Ottosen Committee in 1966 and adviser for the Labour Party parliamentary group from 1966 to 1969.

He then entered civil service as a head of department in the Ministry of Education and Church Affairs from 1969 to 1976, deputy under-secretary of state in the Ministry of Trade from 1976 to 1979 and the Ministry of the Environment from 1979 to 1982. He was then managing director of the Foundation for Student Life in Oslo for one year, special adviser in NTNF in 1983 and after that practising as a lawyer. From 1980 to 1982 he was a board member of the NTNF and a deputy board member of the NAVF. He has also been a board member of Den norske Bank and deputy chair of Oslo Nye Teater.

Sørheim was active in national politics. He served as a deputy representative to the Parliament of Norway from Oslo during the term 1969–1973. In 1981, during Brundtland's First Cabinet, he was a secretary of state at the Office of the Prime Minister.

From 1977 to 1979 he was married to Else Michelet. He resided in Huk. Sørheim died in September 2010, a day after suffering from a stroke.
