= Øystein Paasche =

Norwegian drummer

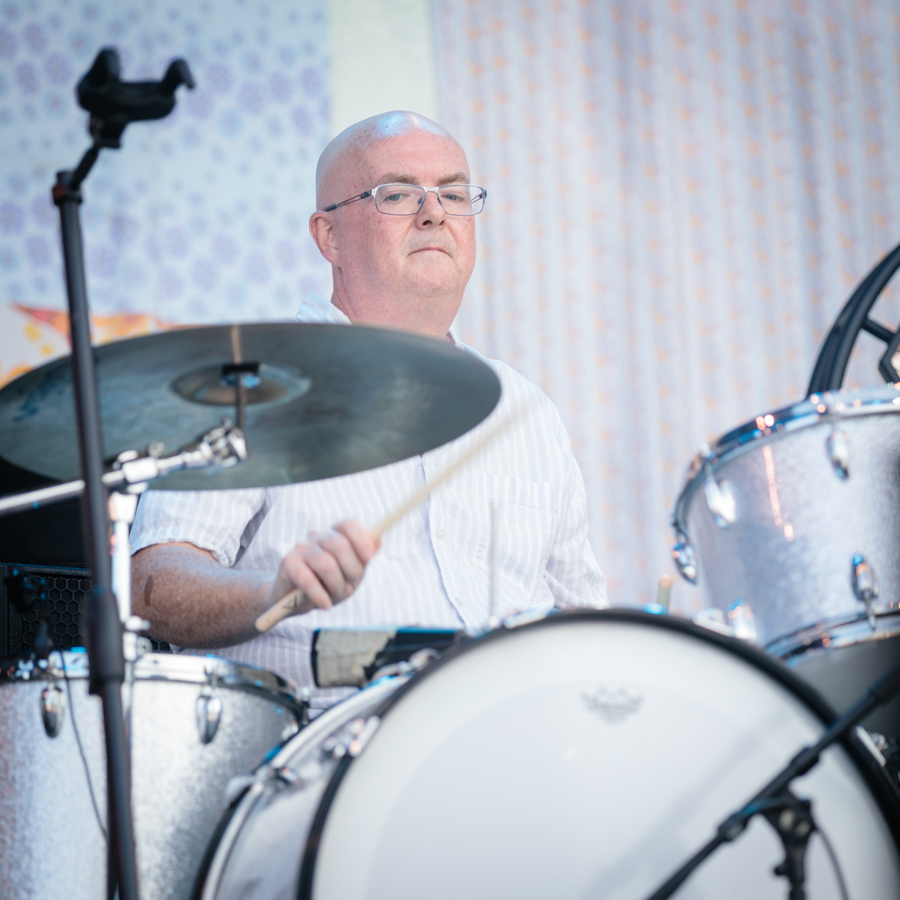
Øystein Paasche performing in 2018

Øystein Paasche (born 3 May 1963) is a Norwegian musician and drummer in deLillos. He took part in the band 1988 replacing Øystein Jevanord. He also played in Badegjestene who recorded an album in 1999. He has also played percussion on the Randall-Mayers album Era / Indian Impressions
