= Øystein Mellerud =

Norwegian ice hockey player

Personal information
- Born: 6 July 1938 Oslo, Norway
- Died: 27 November 1989 (aged 51)

Sport
- Sport: Ice Hockey

Øystein Mellerud (6 July 1938 – 27 November 1989) was a Norwegian ice hockey player. He played for the Norwegian national ice hockey team, and participated at the Winter Olympics in 1964, where he placed tenth with the Norwegian team.
