= Øystein Carlsen =

Norwegian short track speed skater

Personal information
- Nationality: Norwegian
- Born: 30 April 1973 (age 51); Bærum

Sport
- Sport: Speed skating
- Club: Oslo SK

Øystein Carlsen (born 30 April 1973) is a Norwegian speed skater. He was born in Bærum, a grandson of Armand Carlsen, and represented the club Oslo SK. He competed in short track speed skating at the 1994 Winter Olympics.
