= Lonely Crowd =

Norwegian/British rock band

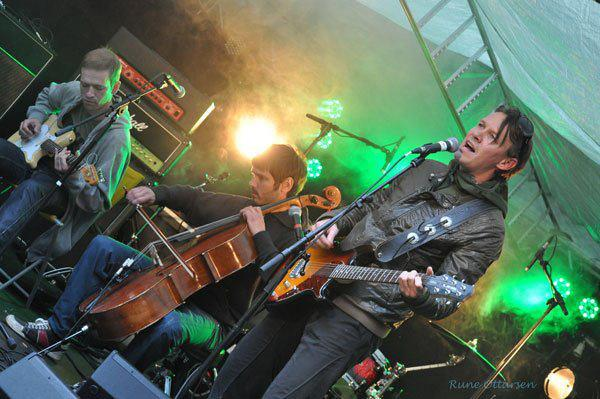
Lonely Crowd

Lonely Crowd is a Norwegian/British psychedelic rock band.

== Biography ==
After years of touring clubs around Europe, Norwegian/English psychedelic outfit Lonely Crowd started making their mark on the radio and even the charts in 2008, with the single "Aren't You Forgetting Something?". With the three hit singles they have had since, they look set to beat Michael Jackson's "Thriller" in terms of Norwegian hits, when the follow-up to their 2007 debut album, Watching From A Distance, is released. The album The Not-So-Great Britain was due in October 2012.

Lonely Crowd has existed in different forms since 1995, when singer Stig Jakobsen left the wildly eccentric Vampire State Building and immediately formed the band, with former members of De Press and Holy Toy. Full of self-confidence, they brought the Mega Records boss to their first gig, and were signed right away, more because of the phenomenal after-party than their live performance. (The party resulted in the band being forbidden to play in Tromsø ever again).

Lonely Crowd released three EPs on Mega, the second of which (Jesus In The Pub) became a radio hit in Norway, and was given rave reviews (six out of six in both Dagbladet and Panorama). The song featured the opera singer Anne-Lise Berntsen, and later became a mini-hit on XFM in London.

Lonely Crowd moved to London before Mega Records released their debut album. Here they set up a studio, and recorded and toured constantly for the next four years. Three of the original members were replaced by a Norwegian guitarist, Marius Gengenbach, and an English rhythm section consisting of double bass player Floyd Jensen and drummer James Corner (formerly of Back To The Planet and Barry Adamson).

Having made a bit of a name for themselves in England, Lonely Crowd were booked on a European tour and later played support to the Fun Lovin' Criminals at their London concert. The band was in the middle of negotiations with one of the larger indie labels in the UK when Jensen died from a sugar coma. The album material, however, was already completed, and most of it ended up on The Not-So-Great Britain album. An acoustic lineup of Lonely Crowd (with cello player Eirik Roald, Stine Varvin (formerly of Vampire State Building) on vocals and Stig Jakobsen on guitar/vocals) went on a Swiss tour, an England tour and played several shows in Norway during 2008-2009.

Lonely Crowd signed a two-album deal with Karisma Records, and release the three first EPs (plus two new tracks) as an album in November 2007, under the name Watching From a Distance. In July 2008 Lonely Crowd experienced their first summer hit, as they spent five weeks in the Norwegian Charts with the single "Aren't You Forgetting Something?". The release contained the first two songs from The Not So Great Britain album (that was eventually released in November 2012). The feat was repeated in August 2009, when the "She's Not Afraid" single reached number 18 in the Norwegian Chart. In May 2010, Lonely Crowd reached their highest position to this date, when "Cosmologies In The Making" made it to No. 12. They also managed two weeks in the Norwegian chart in the summer of 2011, with a single featuring the Norwegian rapper Vinni of Paperboys—"In The Eyes Of The World", and reached No. 3 in the Billboard Norway Digital Song Chart in March 2013 with "Golden Opportunity". Lonely Crowd have also collaborated with David Bowie guitarist Kevin Armstrong and footballer-cum-actor Vinnie Jones.

== Discography ==
- There's No Way Out Of Here [EP] – 1996
- Jesus In The Pub [EP] – 1996
- Heads Are Gonna Roll [EP] – 1997
- Get In The Mixer [EP] – 2001 (UK only release under the name "Godlike Genius," featuring Vinnie Jones on guest vocals)
- Watching From A Distance [Album] – November 2007 (The band's three former EPs on one disc, plus a couple of previously unreleased tracks)
- "Aren't You Forgetting Something?" [Single] – June 2008
- "She's Not Afraid" [Single] – July 2009
- "Cosmologies In The Making" [Single] – May 2010
- "When The Dog Woke Up Inside Her" [Single] – January 2011
- "In The Eyes Of The World" [Single] – June 2011
- "Look The Other Way" [Single] – November 2012
- The Not-So-Great Britain [Album] – November 2012
- "Golden Opportunity" [Single] – January 2013
- "Unrest" [Single] – April 2013
- "Wait till Tomorrow" [Single] – May 2025
- "Not on My Watch" [Single] – September 2025
- "The Country Boy" [Single] – December 2025
- "By the Time You Read This" [Album] – June 2026

=== Timeline ===
https://www.disharmoni.no/lonely-crowd-med-nytt-album-etter-14-ar/
