= Øystein Olsen Ravner =

Norwegian councilor of state and minister

Øystein Olsen Ravner (1893–1975) was a Norwegian appointed councilor of state in the NS government of Vidkun Quisling 1940–1941, and minister 1941–1942 for the Ministry of Provisioning and Reconstruction.
