= Östen (name) =

Östen is a masculine given name. It is a variant of Øystein and is mostly used in Sweden. Notable people with the name are as follows:

- Östen Bergstrand (1873–1948), Swedish astronomer
- Östen Dahl (born 1945), Swedish linguist
- Östen Edlund (born 1934), Swedish discus thrower
- Östen Elfving (1874–1936), Finnish agricultural expert and politician
- Östen Eriksson (born 1958), Swedish musical artist
- Östen Mäkitalo (1938–2011), Swedish electrical engineer
- Östen Sandström (1910–1994), Swedish sprinter
- Östen Sjöstrand (1925–2006), Swedish poet
- Osten Taylor, American reality show contestant
- Östen Undén (1886–1974), Swedish academic and politician
- Östen Warnerbring (1934–2006), Swedish musical artist
