= Espen Beranek Holm =

Norwegian pop artist and comedian (born 1960)

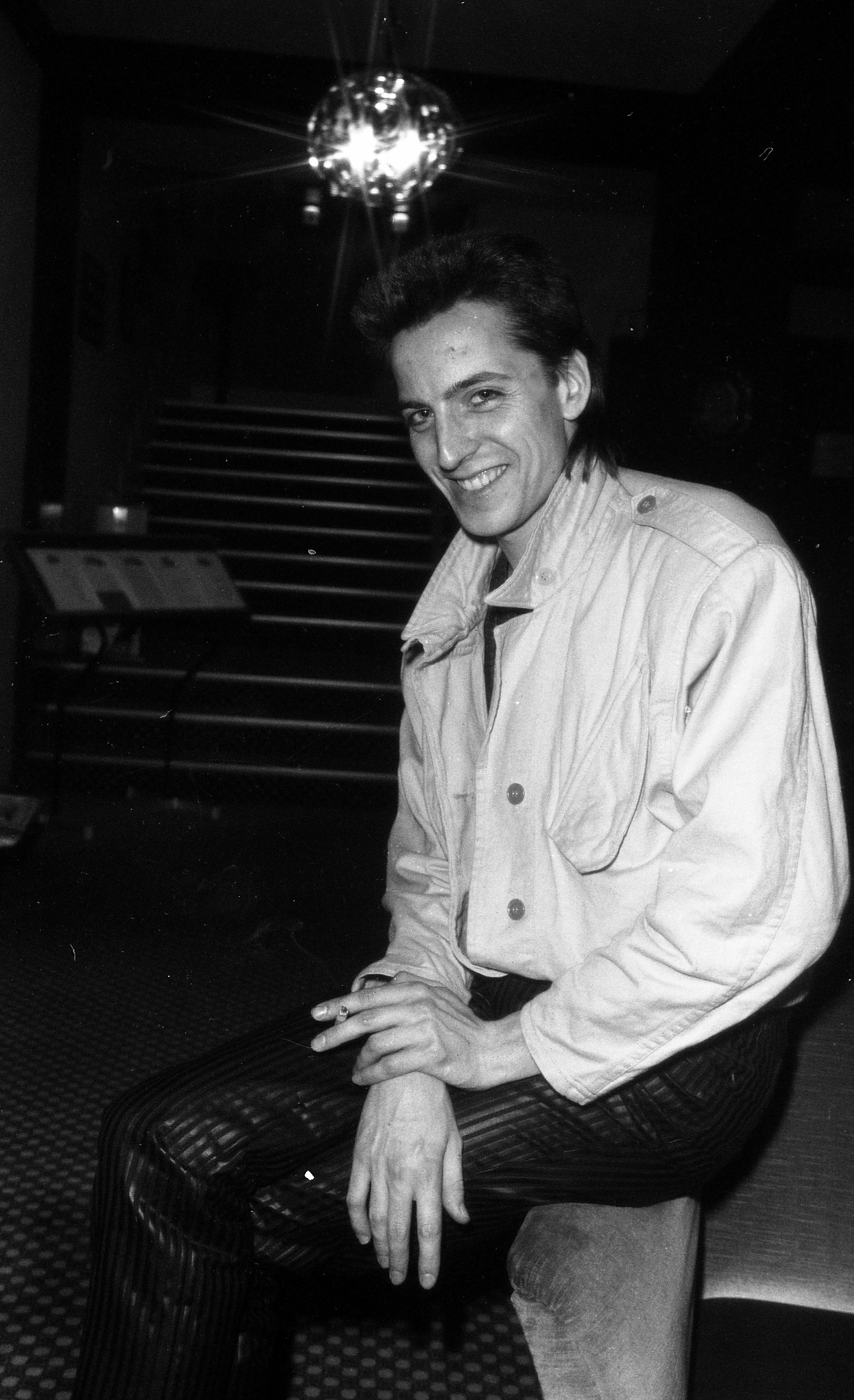
- Holm in 1984

Background information
- Born: 23 March 1960 (age 66)
- Origin: Norway
- Genre: Pop
- Occupations: Musician, comedian
- Instrument: Multi-instrumentalist
- Website: www.beranek.no

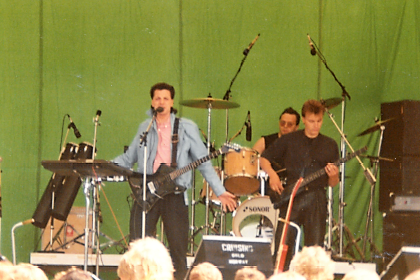
Beranek at Kalvøyafestivalen 1984. Photo: Bjarte Hetland

Espen Beranek Holm (born 23 March 1960) is a Norwegian pop artist and comedian.

== Career ==
Beranek is a Norwegian solo artist. His debut single Dra te' hælvete (1981), which was a great success, caused controversy when the song was banned by NRK. It was followed up by the albums Sound of Danger (1981), X-Ray (1983), Trigger (1984), Daylight In the Dark (1986), The Red File (1988) and Tacoma Bridge (1994). He provided synth, guitar, bass, drums and vocal on all albums, and produced all albums himself. Jean Jaques Burnel from the Stranglers recorded one track together with Beranek on Trigger. He also produced a couple of tracks for Daylight In the Dark as well as providing bass and backing vocals. Dave Greenfield from the Stranglers also contributed to the album with some synth-work together with pedal steel guitarist B.J.Cole.

Beranek has been a member of the bands Dei Nye Kappelanane, Langsomt Mot Nord, Spastisk Ekstase and Ung Pike Forsvunnet. He is currently the vocalist and playing guitar in the Oslo-based power trio Oslo Plektrum.

Beranek was also one of the main participants in the satiric radio program Hallo i uken in NRK P2 until the summer of 2009, together with Are Kalvø and Else Michelet, and was very frequently on the comedy television show Løvebakken, a local version of If I Ruled The World, aired from 2002 through 2012 on NRK.

Beranek´s first release in nearly 20 years, Sensitive Dependence, was released in October 2013.

== Discography ==
Singles:

- Dra te' Hælvete/Balls'n Calls (Mind Expanding Records, May 1981)
- City Lights/A Song of Kindess (Snowflake Records, January 1983)
- It's So Strong/I Believe in You (Snowflake Records, February 1983)
- She's a Great Dancer/High Fly (Snowflake Records, September 1984)
- Dancing in the Wind/Teardrop (Epic / Animal Voice, October 1986)
- Dum-dee-dum-dee/Hotter Than the Sun (CBS / Animal Voice, September 1988)
- Tacoma Bridge/Trick of Sounds (Animal Voice, March 1994)
- One Day' (Animal Voice, April 2013)
- I Wish The Sky Was Blue (Animal Voice, June 2013)
- Fly like a bird (radio edit) (Animal Voice, October 2013)

Album

- Sound of Danger (Mind Expanding Records, November 1981)
- X-Ray' (Snowflake Records, February 1983)
- Trigger' (Snowflake Records, February 1984)
- She´s a Great Dancer (Snowflake Records, September 1985)
- Daylight in the Dark (Epic / Animal Voice, October 986)
- The Red File (CBS / Animal Voice, September 1988)
- Vintage Tapes (Animal Voice, April 1993)
- Tacoma Bridge (Animal Voice, March 1994)
- Sensitive Dependence (Animal Voice, October 21, 2013)
