= Lars Lundevall =

Norwegian musician

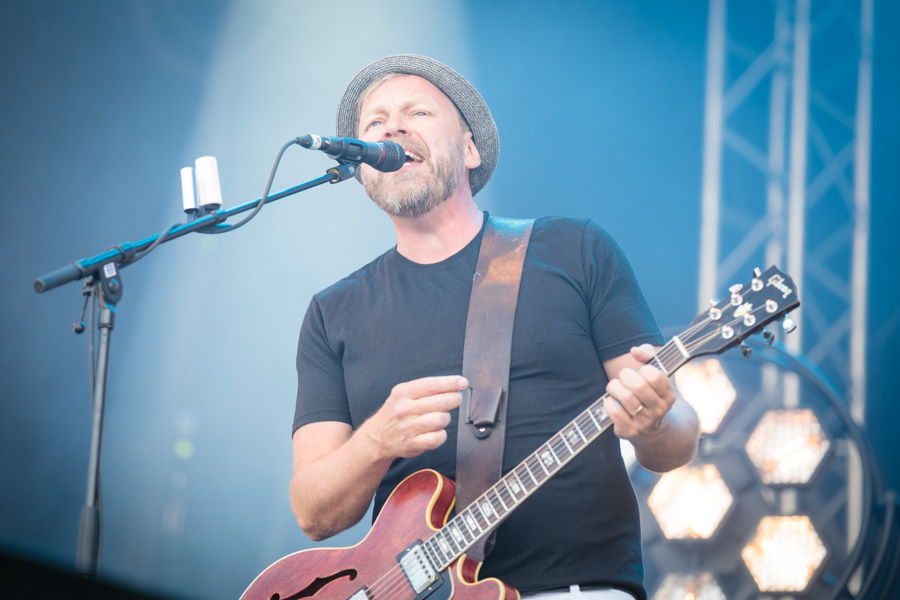
Lars Lundevall performing with deLillos in 2018

Lars Lundevall Is a Norwegian musician who is the guitarist in the band deLillos. He was part in the band as a touring guitarist in 1991, and an ordinary member from 1992. He has recorded a solo album under the name Mr. Smith. He was a member of the group Blister who recorded an album in 2003.

== Discography ==
- Days of Fuzz (2004)
