= Øystein Wormdal =

Norwegian footballer (born 1951)

Personal information
- Date of birth: 8 September 1951 (age 75)
- Position: Right back

Senior career*
Years	Team	Apps	(Gls)
–1970	Orkdal		
1971–1984	Rosenborg	201	(1)

International career
	Norway	5	(0)
- * Club domestic league appearances and goals

Øystein Wormdal is a retired Norwegian footballer who played for Orkdal IL and Rosenborg BK. A right back, he was capped five times for Norway.

== Club career ==
He played for Orkdal during his youth, but after the club was relegated to Fourth Division after the 1970 season, Wormdal transferred to Rosenborg in the First Division. He debuted against Frigg on 5 September 1971. He originally played as a center back, but was quickly transferred to the right back position. Despite Rosenborg winning the double in his inaugural season, Wormdal did not have sufficient matches to claim either title. In the 1971 Cup Final he would have been awarded the title if he had played, but coach Nils Arne Eggen instead chose to use his last substitution for Tor Røste Fossen. Eggen told Wormdal that he would have ample opportunities later, but Rosenborg would not claim a title again until 1985, the season after Womdal retired.

His ultimate match was against Viking on 24 August 1984. In 1984 season, Wormdal was plagued with injuries and manager Bjørn Hansen decided that Wormdal's services would not be needed for the 1985 season. The resulting public outcry led Hansen to change his position, but the offer was the rejected by Wormdal. Wormdal played 201 league matches for Rosenborg, of which 17 were played in the Second Division, and scored one goal. He is the Rosenborg player with the twelfth-most league matches. He played three UEFA Cup and two UEFA European Cup matches. Only seven players have played more seasons for Rosenborg.

== International career ==
Wormdal made his way to the national football team in 1979 and helped Norway qualify for the 1980 Summer Olympics, including winning over West Germany. However, Norway joined in on the 1980 Summer Olympics boycott, hindering Wormdal from becoming an Olympian. He was capped five times for Norway.

== Playing style ==
Wormdal played a right back who was particularly noted for being able to quickly bring the ball from the defense to the offense, also in difficult circumstances. He was offensive and popular among the fans, but controversial and unorthodox. He was best between the two penalty areas. Adresseavisen declared him Rosenborg's all-time right back in 2010, ahead of Vegard Heggem and Christer Basma. The reason was his abilities to get the ball from the defense to the offense, his popularity among the fans and his loyalty to the club.

== Personal life ==
Wormdal lived in Orkdal Municipality during his footballing career, commuting twice a week to Trondheim. After retirement, he chose to not play at lower levels and retired completely from football. Wormdal runs a plant nursery in Orkdal Municipality along with his brother.
