= Lars Fredrik Beckstrøm =

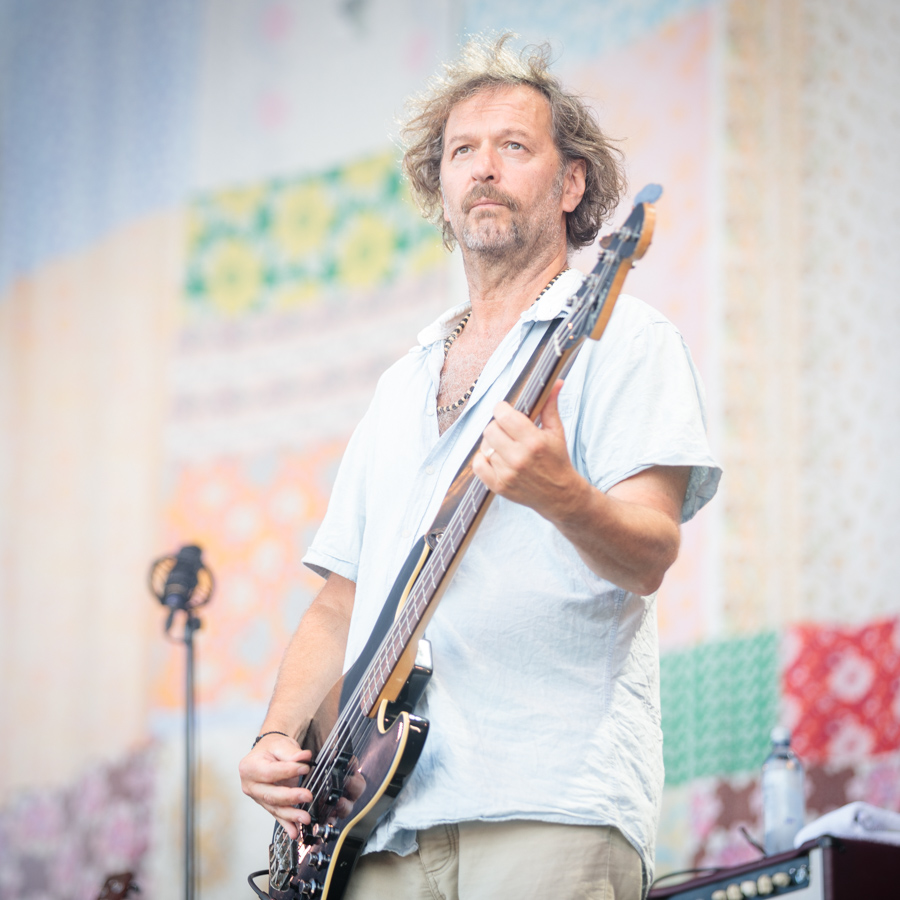
- Lars Fredrik Beckstrøm performing in 2018

Background information
- Genres: Pop, rock, psychedelic pop, folk rock, progressive rock
- Instrument(s): Bass, guitar, vocals, piano, keyboards, organ, mandolin

Lars Fredrik Beckstrøm (born January 22, 1960, in Oslo) is a Norwegian musician who is mostly known for playing bass in the Norwegian rock band deLillos, but has also recorded several albums under the name Beckstrøm. He has written many of the band's well known songs such as "Nittenåttifire" and "Balladen om Kåre og Nelly", which he on albums and concerts sings himself. As a solo artist "Svigermor" from 1997 is his biggest hit.

He is also a member of Dog Age and "The Humble Servants".

== Discography ==
- Tett i tett (1992)
- Lykkens kalosjer (1997)
- Helium (2003)
- Drøm videre! (2006)
- Døgenikt (2008)
