= Electro Spectre =

- Electro Spectre performing live at Maanefisken in October 2010

Background information
- Genres: Synthpop, new romantic, new wave,
- Years active: 2009–present
- Labels: Crab Key Records, Meisel Music

Electro Spectre is a Norwegian electronic music duo from Oslo, Norway. The band consists of Isak Rypdal (writer-producer) and Alexander Björneboe (writer-singer).

Their debut album Watch It All Turn was initially released in June 2009. The album was later reproduced and re-released in 2010. In September 2012 the band released their second studio album entitled: Dangerous Game. The album was followed by a tour early 2013.

== Watch It All Turn ==
The album is influenced by a lot of different electronic music from the eighties to present, spanning from New Romantic synth pop to more dark edge alternative pop. The band released their first single "Yet It's Love" taken from Watch It All Turn in September 2010, and the music video quickly entered NRK Svisj with MTV soon to follow. The song "Six Strings From Hell" was in July 2009 picked up by Major Records, Germany and released on Orbit Electro Vol1.

== Dangerous Game ==
Their second studio album, entitled Dangerous Game was released in September 2012, and has a darker edge compared to the debut album Watch It All Turn. Still the album contains more poppy tracks such as "Dancing Girl" and "Love Thief". The band has stated that they are out to continue in the field of albums such as Violator and Songs Of Faith And Devotion by Depeche Mode back in the 90's. The album Dangerous Game was suggested as the best electro pop album for 2012 by Side Line Magazine .

== Live ==
The band had their live debut performance on the ElectroStat festival in October 2010 at Maanefisken, Oslo, and played prime time as the last band on stage before headliner Mesh, with massive response from the audience.

== Discography ==
- 2009: "Watch It All Turn" (Album)
- 2010: "Yet It's Love" (Single)
- 2010: "Monster" (Single / free digital download)
- 2011: "Suspicious Minds" (Single)
- 2012: "Dancing Girl" (Single)
- 2012: "Dangerous Game" (Album)
- 2013: "Tokyo Shuffle" [EP]
- 2013: "Pop Ghost" [Album]
- 2014: "Bullets & Desert Blooms" (Album)
- 2015: "The River" (Single)
- 2016: "Beautiful Lies" (Album)
- 2018: "A Man-Made Sun" (Album)
- 2021: "The endless Sky" (Single)
- 2022: "Stereo Dreams, Pt. 1" (EP)
- 2022: "Stereo Dreams, Pt. 2" (EP)
- 2022: "Stereo Dreams, Pt. 3" (EP)

=== Music videos ===
Year	Song	Director	Album
2010	"Yet It's Love"	Rune Hov	Watch It All Turn
