= Dog Age =

Norwegian rock band

- Origin: Oslo, Norway
- Genres: Psychedelic rock, pop, rock, folk rock
- Years active: 1989–present
- Labels: VME, Rainbow Quartz, Magical Jack
- Members: Jørn Smedslund; Jon Anders Strand; Harald Beckstrøm; Lars Fredrik Beckstrøm; Øystein Jevanord
- Past members: Ola Sørlie; Geirr Thoresen; Christian Refsum; Thomas Widerberg; Tov Ramstad
- Website: www.skyggespill.no/dogage/

Dog Age is a Norwegian rock band established in 1987. They are currently signed to the Norwegian record company VME, after a short, intermittent spell with Rainbow Quartz Records. Their musical style is probably best described as psychedelia or psychedelic pop, but there are also elements of folk rock and progressive rock. Especially from the early seventies.

Group members are (as of October 2013): Jon Anders Strand; lead & backing vocals, guitars. Harald Beckstrøm; lead & backing vocals, guitars, bass. Lars Fredrik Beckstrøm; lead & backing vocals, bass, guitars. Jørn Smedslund; lead & backing vocals. Øystein Jevanord; drums and percussion. Eystein Hopland, keyboards.

The band's 2006 album, Reefy Seadragon, received a 3.5 rating from AllMusic, which noted, "The unfailingly melodic tunes are decorated with out-front sitar parts, Hendrix-like wah-wah guitar and fanciful, childlike lyrics from the Syd Barrett stylebook."

== Discography ==
- Good Day (LP 1989)
- Outdated Yeah (7-inch EP/Single «Freda's Married», 1990)
- Sigh No More (LP, 1991)
- Harm Last Train compilation CD (1994)
- Makes You Wonder on Hi Jack! (LP, 1995)
- Puddle (7-inch EP 1996)
- Two LPs on One CD (Good Day + Sigh No More, CD 1997)
- As It Were (CD 1998)
- When the Fish Are Down (CD 2002)
- Reefy Seadragon (CD 2006)
- On the Garish Isles (CD 2011)
- Swanlake Gate (CD 2015)
