= Øystein Hauge =

Norwegian writer

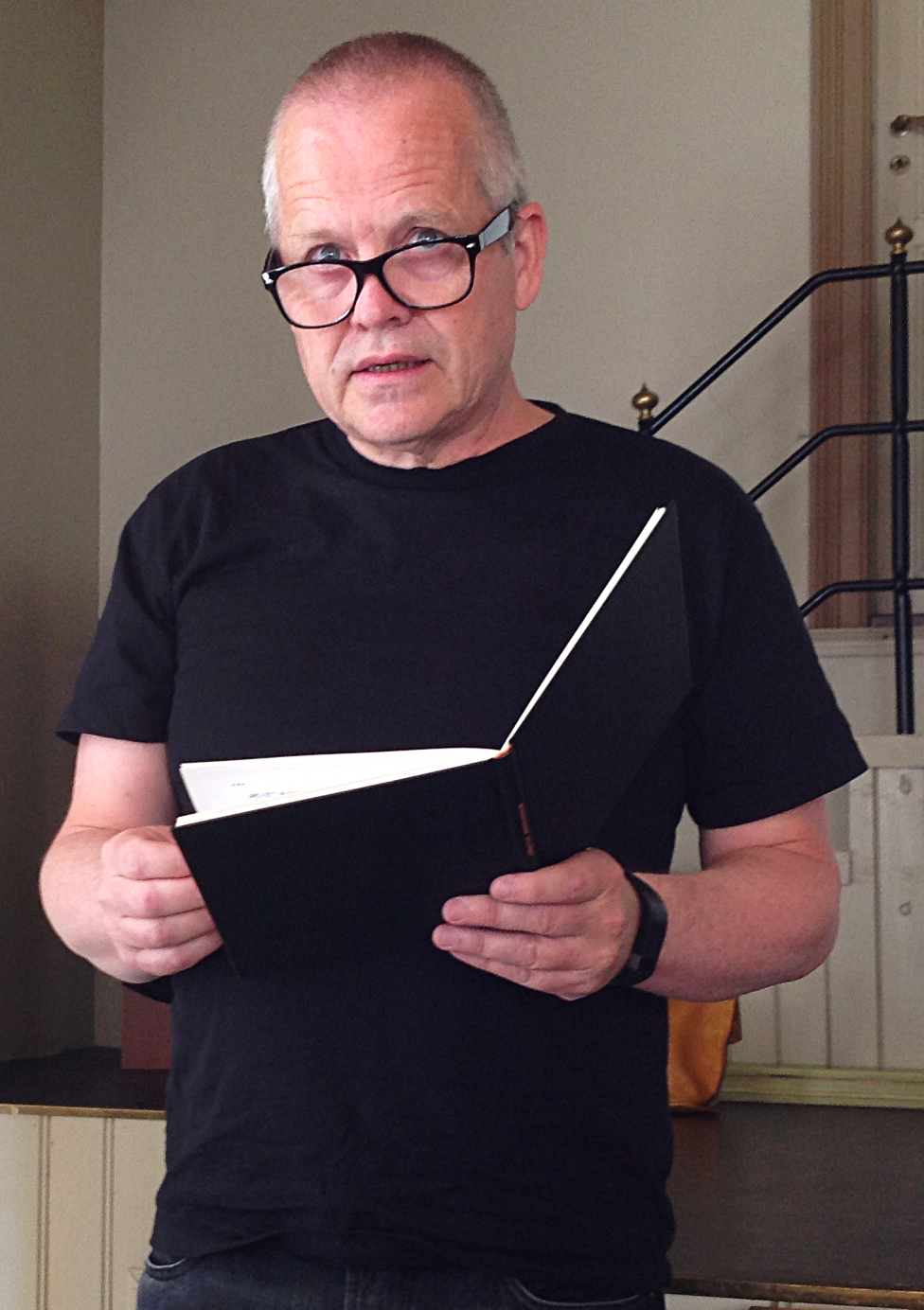
Øystein Hauge reading at Lyrikk, takk! in 2014. Credit: Kristin Havstad (Aust-Agder bibliotek og kulturformidling)

Øystein Hauge (born 10 December 1956 in Vegårshei, Aust-Agder) is a Norwegian writer.

He hails from Vegårshei Municipality. He debuted in 1989 with the poetry collection Messe og maskespel .

Outside of literature, he has worked as a civil servant in the Ministry of Justice and the Compulsory Civilian National Service Administration.
