= Øystein Bonvik =

Norwegian communication consultant, author and lecturer

- Born: 16 February 1971 (age 55); Ålesund
- Citizenship: Norwegian
- Occupations: Consultant, author, lecturer, keynote holder

Øystein Bonvik (born 16 February 1971 in Ålesund, Norway) is a Norwegian communications adviser, author, keynote speaker and university lecturer. He works in the fields of strategic communications and crisis communication, and is particularly known for his work on generational diversity and the multi-generational workplace.

He runs his own consultancy and teaches public relations and marketing communications at the BI Norwegian Norwegian Business School. He was one of the founders of the Norwegian consultancy PR-operatørene, which he also led for several years.

Earlier in his career, he served as Communications Manager at Coca-Cola Norway, communications consultant at JKL Oslo and Burson-Marsteller, and information officer at the Norwegian NATO headquarters in Stavanger.

He holds a degree in journalist from The University of Georgia, and an Executive Master of Management from BI Norwegian Business School. He also completed internships at CNN in Washington D.C., and at several Norwegian newspapers.

Bonvik has authored and co-authored a number of professional books on communication, public relations and leaderships. His publications include Frist meg ikke inn i ledelse (Don't Tempt Me into Leadership), 2014; revised edition 2024, CTRL+ALT. Strategisk, kreativt og praktisk – kunsten å skrive på vegne av virksomheter (CTRL+ALT. Strategic, Creative and Practical – The Art of Writing on Behalf of Organisations, 2025, with Peggy Simcic Brønn), and Fire generasjoner på jobben. En guide til samspill på tvers – fremfor total kjræsj (Four Generations at Work. A Guide to Cross-Generational Collaboration – Instead of Total Collision, 2026).

The latter explores how four generations work side by side in today's workplace and how leaders and employees can turn generational diversity into a strength through clearer communication and a better understanding of differing experiences and expectations.

Through his books, teaching, keynote presentations and advisory work, Bonvik has focused on strategic communication, reputation management, media relations, crisis communication and the multi-generational workplace. He is also a frequent commentator in Norwegian media on communication and leadership.

In 2014, Bonvik received the Norwegian PR industry's Honorary Award in recognition of his professional, reputational and commercial contributions to the communications profession.

Since 2026, he has co-hosted the podcast På innsiden og utsiden (Inside and Outside) together with Pål Heldaas. Produced in collaboration with Kampanje, the podcast explores crises, communication and trust through conversations with people who have experienced high-profile reputation crises firsthand.

== Bibliography ==
Bonvik has written or co-written the following books:

- Great PR. The Practical Approach to Marketing PR (2007)
- PR Tips (2007)
- The Corporate Voice (2010)
- Earn the Attention (2012)
- How to Succeed With Owned Media (2013)
- Do Not Tempt Me Into Leadership (2014)
- An Introduction to PR (2015)
- A practical and simple approach to labour law (2016)
- CTRL+ALT. Strategic, Creative and Practical – The Art of Writing on Behalf of Organizations (2025)
- Four Generations at Work. A Guide to Cross-Generational Collaboration – Instead of Total Collision (2026)

== Website ==
bonvik.com
