= Eva Knardahl =

Norwegian musician (1927–2006)

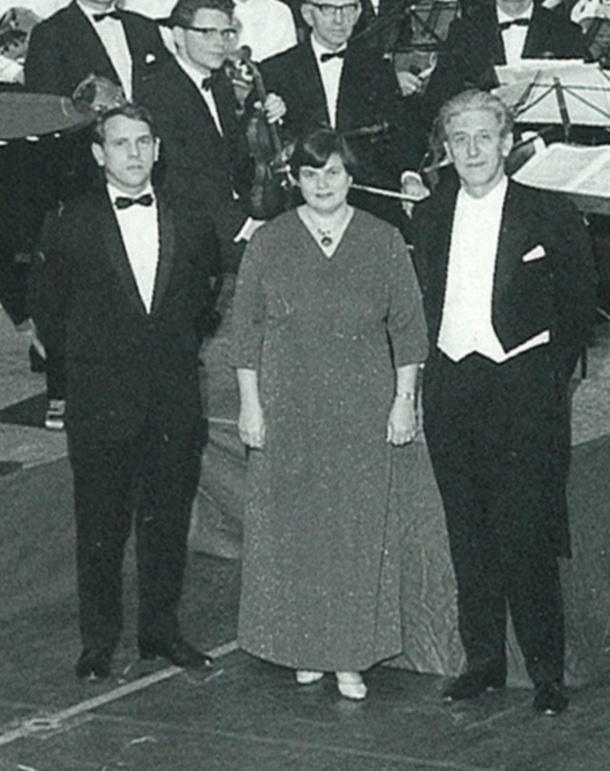
Kåre Opdal, Eva Knardahl, Finn Audun Oftedal (conductor) (l-r) (1970)

Eva Knardahl Freiwald (10 May 1927 – 3 September 2006) was a Norwegian pianist, with a noted career both as a child prodigy and adult performer.

== Career ==
Her debut with the Oslo Philharmonic Orchestra at the age of 12, in which she played three concertos (those by Johann Sebastian Bach in F minor, Joseph Haydn in D major and Carl Maria von Weber in C major), was received with rave reviews. Knardahl was a student of Mary Barrat Due, who was educated in Italy. Idar Karevold, a music professor in Oslo, said that Knardahl's Italian style was unique in Norway.

She started releasing records early. One of her first recordings was Edvard Grieg's "Wedding Day at Trollhaugen", which was released in 1946.

She emigrated at 19 to the United States, where she had a distinguished career with the Minnesota Orchestra for 15 years. She played on most continents, and for 15 years she was also employed as a pianist ("resident pianist") by the Minneapolis Symphony Orchestra. In a later interview, she told about the US era that the famous composer Henry Mancini often visited the symphony orchestra in Minneapolis. He used to bring his chosen soloists with him during the performance of his compositions, but had so much confidence in Knardahl that he never brought any external pianist.

In 1952, Eva Knardahl was hired as a pianist and soloist in the Minneapolis Symphony Orchestra (MSO). Here she became responsible for all piano parts, and she was used in all sorts of different combinations of chamber music with piano, in addition to which she was given major tasks as the orchestra's regular soloist - including trips to Canada, Mexico and the East.

In the USA, collaboration with pianist Artur Rubinstein, composer Igor Stravinsky and conductors Rafael Kubelík, Henry Mancini and André Previn made great artistic progress. Later collaborations with conductors such as Sixten Erling and Kirill Kondrasjin led to successes in Europe.

She returned to Norway in 1967. She became a popular fixture on the Norwegian music scene and was named the first professor of chamber music at the Norwegian Academy of Music.

Knardahl is most known for her interpretations of the piano works of Edvard Grieg. She recorded the composer's complete piano music on 13 LPs for BIS Records in 1977-1980. The recordings were reissued in 2006 on 12 compact discs, also on BIS Records.

== Death ==
She died in Oslo, aged 79.

== Awards ==
Knardahl was awarded the Norwegian Spellemanspris twice, and she also won the Norwegian Critics' Prize in 1968.
