= Jørn Christensen =

- Born: December 29, 1959 (age 65)
- Origin: Norway
- Genres: Rock
- Occupations: Artist, actor, record producer
- Instrument: Guitar
- Years active: 1980–present

Jørn Christensen (born 29 December 1959) is a Norwegian guitarist and record producer.

He grew up in Fredrikstad and learned the guitar after hearing Deep Purple. His first band was De Press, playing with Andrej Nebb and Ola Snortheim. After leaving De Press, Christensen and Snortheim founded Cirkus Modern with members from Kjøtt. Christensen and Snortheim also founded the side project Langsomt Mot Nord, and Christensen played on Norske Gutter's single "Gud signe". Christensen also played in Can Can with Anne Grete Preus and Per Vestaby from 1983 to 1986, moving on to start Mercury Motors with Vestaby and Øyvind Hansen.

Jørn Christensen also contributed to Per Vestaby's solo album in 1993. Together with Vestaby he joined CC Cowboys, which Christensen had formerly produced. Christensen also produced deLillos, and Christensen and Vestaby contributed to Lars Lillo-Stenberg's solo project. Christensen and Vibeke Saugestad's joint project was called Thinkerbell, and Christensen was later an "adviser" and session musician for Tommy Tokyo. Furthermore, Christensen produced Sterk Naken og Biltyvene, Tolv Volt, Pogo Pops and Frank Hammersland's solo project, and Bjørn Eidsvåg. Christensen's studio Rodeløkka Studio was closed in 1996, preceded by a concert at Smuget with a lineup of 15 bands, including "the four greats" from the 1980s.

He had a leading role in the Norwegian movie X (1986), directed by Oddvar Einarson. As X was an "impossible love story" between a 25-year old and a 12-year old played by Bettina Banoun, the director wanted a non-actor for the role, a "rocker who was used to performing on a stage", and chose Christensen.

In 2008, Christensen also appeared on the children's album "Magic hooks & secrets" produced by Linn Skåber and Jacob Young with the song "Winter is here".

In 2018, he released an album with Hågen Rørmark under the band name The Sleepends. Jørn Christensen has been a member of the Young Neils.
