= Else Michelet =

Norwegian journalist (1942–2021)

- Born: 16 February 1942; Trondheim, Norway
- Died: 3 May 2021 (aged 79)
- Education: University of Oslo
- Occupations: Journalist; Satirical writer Songwriter
- Employer: Norwegian Broadcasting Corporation
- Spouse: Ingjald Ørbeck Sørheim
- Awards: Fritt Ord Honorary Award

Else Michelet (16 February 1942 – 3 May 2021) was a Norwegian journalist, satirical writer and songwriter. She had a long career with the Norwegian Broadcasting Corporation, from 1967, and was awarded the Fritt Ord Honorary Award in 2009.

== Early and personal life ==
Michelet was born in Trondheim as a daughter of teacher Frans Oscar Michelet (1906–1984) and housewife Synnøve née Kulseng (1905–1981). The family moved to Bærum in 1947, and Michelet graduated from the University of Oslo with a cand.mag. degree in English, French and literature. From 1977 to 1979 she was married to Ingjald Ørbeck Sørheim.

== Career ==
Michelet worked for the Norwegian Broadcasting Corporation from 1967; in the radio from 1973. She contributed to the entertainment programs Nitimen and Reiseradioen, and worked with the weekly satirical radio show Hallo i uken from 1990. She was its producer from 1993 to 2009.

She wrote several books: Sin egen herre: eventyr og annet ugress (1979), En annen historie (1981) and the novel Ariadnes tråd: et reiseliv (1988). Michelet received Årets fagpris as one of the Komiprisen awards in 2007. She was awarded the Fritt Ord Honorary Award in 2009, for her journalistic works in general, and particularly for developing the radio show Hallo i uken.
