= Øystein Josefsen =

Norwegian businessman and politician

Øystein Sigurd Josefsen (born 1944 in Vågan Municipality, Norway) is a Norwegian businessman and former politician for the Conservative Party. He was Director General at the Prime Minister's office from 1983 to 1988. In 1986 he was State Secretary in the Ministry of Finance until the second cabinet of Kåre Willoch fell in May 1986.

Josefsen has been chairman of the board in Geelmuyden.Kiese, senior vice president at Capgemini, CEO of Gemini Consulting and IKO Gruppen. He has also been chairman of the board of the Norwegian Red Cross and chairman of the Conservative Students' Association (Oslo).
