= De Press =

Polish-Norwegian rock band

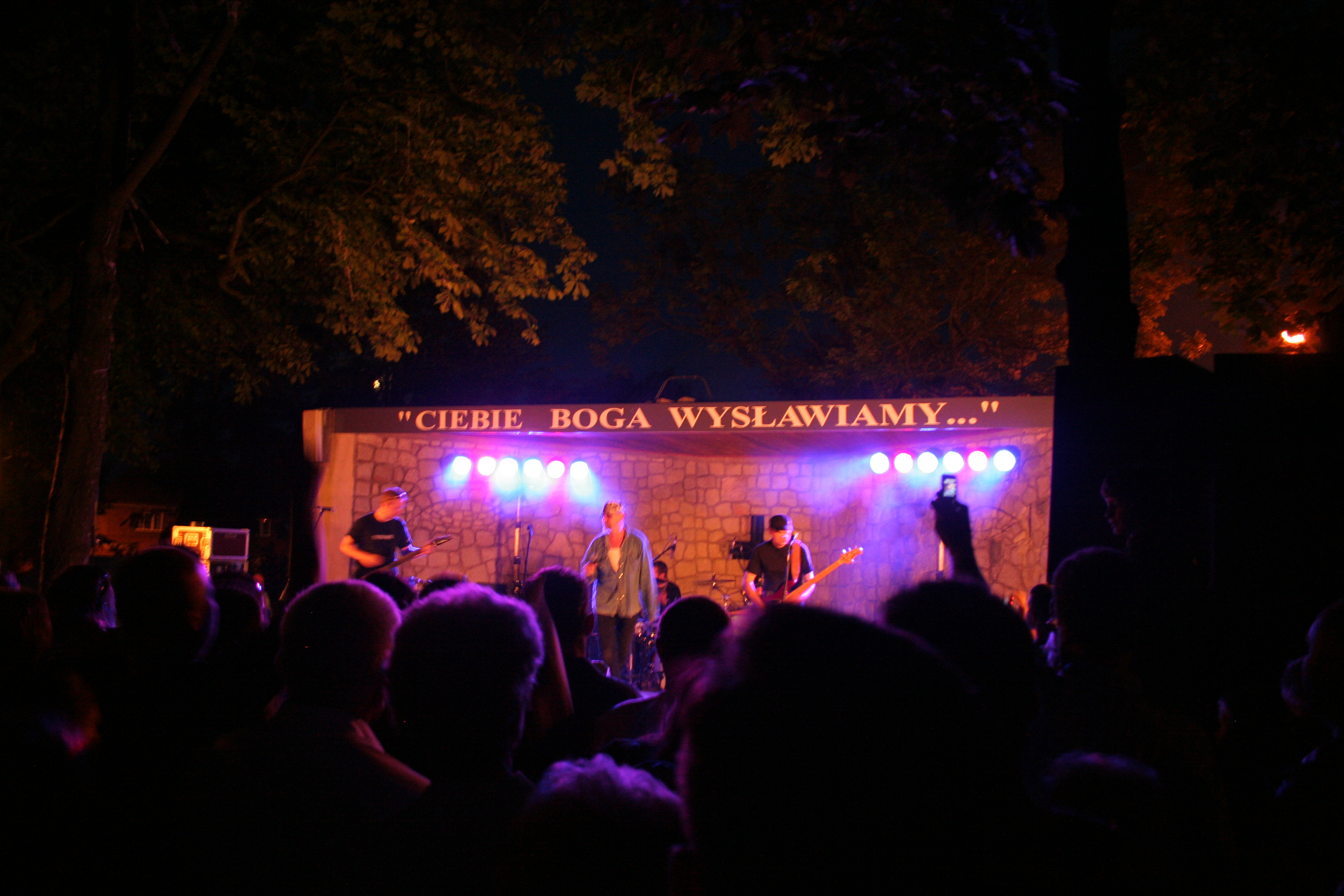
- Rock group De Press during concert in 2009 in Łeba.

Background information
- Origin: Oslo, Norway
- Genres: Rock, new wave
- Years active: 1980–present
- Members: Andrej Nebb; Darek Budkiewicz; Tomasz Fudala; Lukasz Gocal
- Past members: Jørn Christensen; Ola Snortheim
- Website: www.de-press.pl

De Press is a Polish-Norwegian rock band founded in Oslo in 1980. They were among the leading Norwegian new wave bands, and also gained a following in Poland.

== History ==
The original De Press had the following line-up:

- Andrej Nebb (Andrzej Dziubek) - vocals and bass
- Jørn Christensen - guitar
- Ola Snortheim - drums and percussion

They recorded their first album in 1981 with the title Block to Block. The original De Press disbanded in 1981, but also recorded an album in 1982. They reunited in 1991. By 1995, Nebb was the only remaining original member. With various line-ups, Nebb's De Press still tour and release records in Poland.

Between 2007 and 2011 De Press reformed with the following line-up:

- Andrej Nebb - vocals
- Darek Budkiewicz - bass
- Tomasz Fudala - guitar (Vacation)
- Łukasz Gocal - drums (Vacation)

== Discography ==
=== Albums ===
- Block to Block (1981)
- Product (1982)
- On the Other Side (live, 1983)
- The Ballshov Trio (1991)
- 3 Potocki (1991)
- Vodka Party (1993)
- Groj skrzypko groj (1994)
- Potargano chałpa (1997)
- Dwie tęsknoty (1998)
- deFinite (2CD, 2000)
- Śleboda (2000)
- Russian Party (2001)
- Cy bocycie Świnty Ojce (2002)
- Lars Hertevig/On the Other Side (re-issue, 2005)
- Rekyl (2006)
- Zre Nas Konsumpcja (2008)
- Kolędy (2008)
- Myśmy Rebelianci (2009)
- Norwid: Gromy i pyłki (2010)
- Amen (2011)
- Sex spod Tater (2013)
- Body Manifest (2019)
- Harnaś już nie żyje, or Harnaś już nie żyje (Leader is Dead) (2025)

=== Singles ===
- Pond (1980)
- Lars Hertevig (1981)
- In a Crowded Room (1982)
- East Block 2-Step (1991)
- Pust Wiesegda (2005)
- Żre nas Konsumpcja (2008)
- Elektryczny baca (2008)
- Katyń/Smoleńsk (2010)
