= Ola Snortheim =

Norwegian artist and record producer (born 1954)

Ola Snortheim (born December 3, 1954, Harpefoss) is a Norwegian artist and record producer.

Snortheim is the son of the folk-musician Olav Snortheim. Known as one of the most important drummers on the Norwegian rock-scene of the 1980s and 1990s, he has played in many bands, often together with guitarist Jørn Christensen.

The most famous of the rock-bands Snortheim have played in was De Press. The group won the prize Spellemannprisen in the class New Rock in 1981, after releasing the album Block to Block.

Snortheim is the founder of the electronica-group Langsomt Mot Nord.

Ola Snortheim has played in the following Norwegian bands:

- Blaupunkt
- Cirkus Modern
- De Press
- Langsomt Mot Nord
- Lonely Crowd
- Montasje
- Norske Gutter
- Spastisk Ekstase
- Sterk, Naken og Biltyvene
- Streethawks
- The Tourettes

== Sources in Norwegian ==
- Ola Snortheim Wikipedia
- Ola Snortheim Rockipedia
