= DeLillos =

Norwegian pop rock band

deLillos
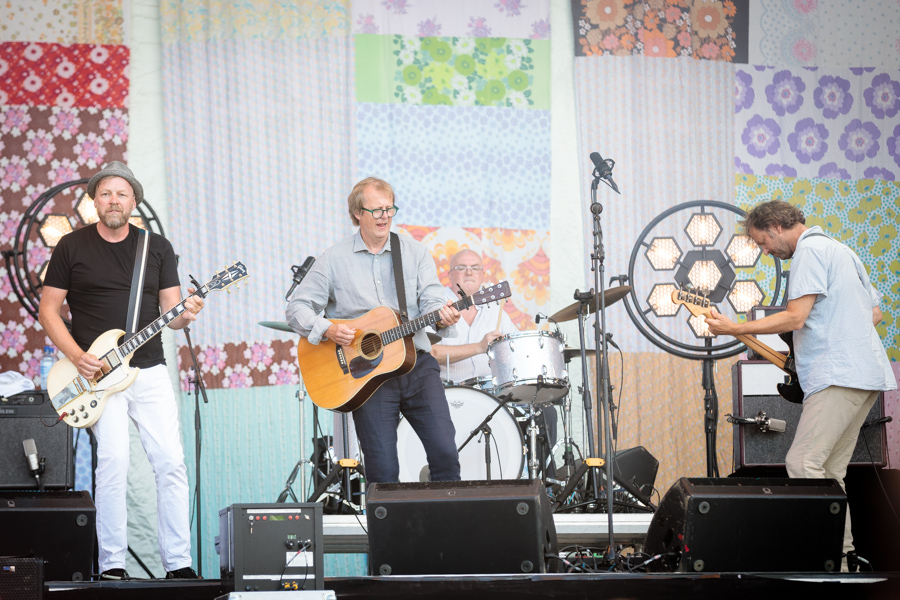
- deLillos performing at the Stavernfestivalen on July 13, 2018.

Background information
- Origin: Oslo, Norway
- Genres: Pop rock
- Years active: 1984–present
- Label: Sonet
- Members: Lars Lillo-Stenberg; Lars Fredrik Beckstrøm; Øystein Paasche; Lars Lundevall

deLillos is a Norwegian pop rock band formed in Oslo in 1984. They are generally regarded as one of the "Four Greats" in modern Norwegian pop music, i.e. one of the four 1980s groups that founded a new tradition for rock music with lyrics in Norwegian. The remaining three "Greats" are DumDum Boys, Raga Rockers and Jokke & Valentinerne.

== History ==
The group was formed in 1984 by Lars Lillo-Stenberg with bassist and occasional vocalist Lars Fredrik Beckstrøm and drummer Rune Lindstrøm. In 1985, Lindstrøm left the band to join the Hare Krishna movement and was replaced by Øystein Jevanord. In 1988, Jevanord left and was replaced by Øystein Paasche. In 1992, the band added guitarist Lars Lundevall.

The most recent studio album credited to deLillos was Midt i begynnelsen from 2002. Both Lars Lillo-Stenberg and Lars Fredrik Beckstrøm have released several solo albums. The debut album Suser avgårde (1986) is still one of deLillos' most popular records.

In 2005, the first two deLillos albums were re-released in Deluxe Editions which included the 1985 demo "Kjerringvikdemoen". This inspired Lars Lillo Stenberg and Lars Fredrik Beckstrøm to reunite the "original" deLillos with Rune Lindstrøm under the name "deLillos '85". To celebrate their reunion, the trio played a concert at the tiny Elm Street rock-club in Oslo in November 2005. In 2006, they continued as deLillos '85 and released the album "Suser videre".

== Members ==
- Lars Lillo-Stenberg – guitar, vocals, organ, piano, synthesizer and writer (1984–present)
- Lars Fredrik Beckstrøm – bass and vocals (1984–present)
- Øystein Paasche – drums and guitar (1989–2005, 2013–present)
- Lars Lundevall – guitar and vocals (1992–2005, 2009–present)

=== Former members ===
- Svenn Arne Glosli – bass and guitar (1984)
- Øystein Jevanord – drums + vocals (1986–1988)
- Rune Lindstrøm – drums (1984–1985 and 2006–2012)

== Discography ==
=== Albums ===
- Suser avgårde (1986) – also available in 2-CD deluxe edition
- Før Var Det Morsomt Med Sne (1987) – also available in 2-CD deluxe edition
- Hjernen Er Alene (1989)
- Svett Smil (1990)
- Varme Mennesker (1991)
- Neste sommer (1993)
- Mere (live album) (1994)
- Sent og Tidlig (1995)
- Stakkars (1997)
- Gamle sanger om igjen|Gamle Sanger Om Igjen (1998) (compilation)
- Kast alle papirene (1999)
- Midt i begynnelsen (2002)
- Festen er ikke over... det er kake igjen (2005) – (2-CD 40 track compilation with 6 new songs)
- Suser videre (2006)
- Huskeglemme (2009)
- Hjernen er alene i Operaen (live album) (2010)
- Trist å være glad (2011)
- Vi er på vei, vi kanke snu (2012)
- Rett Og Slett Livet (2014)
- Peiling På Seiling (2016)
- La Oss Bli Fri For All Nostalgi (2017)
- Dum som et menneske (2020)
- Evige dager (2022)
- 20 Lillos uten filter (2025)

=== EPs ===
- "Ikke gå" (2004) (Songs from Elling and Buddy)

=== Singles ===
- "Fugl i bur/Johnny Fredrik" (1985)
- "Tøff i pyjamas" (1986)
- "S'il vous plait" (1987)
- "Kunstig og kulørt/Utkaster" (1988)
- "Sveve over byen" (1989)
- "Lebestift" (1989)
- "Hankøslagerne" (1990)
- "Beibi/ha det bra" (1990)
- "Da tieren var gul/elskling" (1990)
- "Frognerbadet" (1991)
- "Neste sommer" (1993)
- "Sne og is" (1994)
- "Smak av honning" (1995)
- "Enda mere" (1995)
- "1000 smil" (1996)
- "Det var Stones" (1998)
- "Nå vil vi til Sverige" (1999)
- "Ikke gå" (2003)
- "Trist å være glad" (2011)
- "Rett og slett livet" (2014)

=== Video ===
- Si'l vous plait (1987)
- Enda mere (1995)

=== DVD ===
- Enda mere (2001)
- Hjernen er alene i Operaen (2010)

=== Kjerringvikdemoen ===
This was released in two parts in 2005. The first part on the deluxe edition of Suser avgårde, the second on the Deluxe Edition of Før var det morsomt med sne.

Track list (part one) :

1. "Hva har du tenkt?"
2. "Jeg er på vei hjem nå"
3. "Livet er en liten dings"
4. "Hei jeg er tilbake"
5. "Suser avgårde alle mann"
6. "Tøff i pysjamas"
7. "Walking on a river"
8. "Nå som vi alle er forskjellige"
9. "Siste sommerferiedag"
10. "Min beibi dro avsted"
11. "Soppesmørbrød"
12. "Skulle bare være morsom"
13. "Johnny Fredrik"
14. "Fugl i bur"
15. "Kunstig og kulørt"
16. "Avismannen"
17. "Racerbåt"
18. "Venter på telefon"
19. "Vil ikke sove"
20. "Jeg vet nok ikke"
21. "Forelsket"
22. "Eventyr"
23. "S'il vous plait"
24. "Hun har gått seg vill"
25. "Skulle bare være morsom"
26. "Together with my baby"

== Sources ==
- Media related to DeLillos at Wikimedia Commons
- Norwegian pop and rock encyclopaedia. Vega Forlag, 2005. ISBN 978-82-92489-09-3.
- Official webpage
- Biography on Allmusic

Awards
Preceded by Tre Små Kinesere	Recipient of the Band Spellemannprisen; 1995	Succeeded by Bel Canto
