= Irelande Douze Pointe =

2008 song by Dustin the Turkey

Single by Dustin the Turkey
- Language: English (with phrases in French, German, Italian, and Spanish)
- English title: "Ireland Twelve Points"
- Released: 18 April 2008
- Length: 2:57
- Label: Kite Entertainment
- Songwriters: Darren Smith; Simon Fine; John Morrison

Dustin the Turkey singles chronology
"Patricia the Stripper" (2005)	"Irelande Douze Pointe" (2008)

Audio sample
- file; help

Eurovision Song Contest 2008 entry
- Country: Ireland
- Artist: John Morrison
- As: Dustin the Turkey

Finals performance
- Semi-final result: 15th
- Semi-final points: 22

Entry chronology
- ◄ "They Can't Stop the Spring" (2007)
- "Et Cetera" (2009) ►

Official performance video
- "Irelande Douze Pointe" on YouTube

"Irelande Douze Pointe" [sic] (transl. Ireland Twelve Points, correct French: Irlande douze points) is a 2008 novelty song by Irish puppet act Dustin the Turkey, played by John Morrison. The song represented Ireland in the Eurovision Song Contest 2008 after winning Eurosong 2008, the Irish national final. The song was performed in the first semi-final of the contest, held on 20 May 2008, and placed 15th with 22 points, failing to qualify for the final. Reception was mixed, with it peaking at number 5 on the Irish Singles Chart.

== Background ==
Despite the pseudo-French song title, the lyrics of the song are mainly in English. The title refers to the Eurovision Song Contest's voting procedure, where all voting results are read in both English and French, and where a score of twelve (French: douze) is the highest possible result. If Ireland were to win 12 points, the result would have been read as Irlande douze points (not Irelande [non existant word] and not pointe [French for 'peak' or 'tip']) in French. The voting procedure has become notorious over the years due to supposed geopolitical voting, especially in Eastern countries.

According to Dustin, he did not consider "Irelande Douze Pointe" as a song, but rather an anthem or hymn to unite Europe, saying "It's getting everyone dancing and rejoicing in the street. I'm telling you, the deaf will see and the blind will hear when this song goes worldwide." In a later interview, Dustin later admitted that he was considered as the Irish entry as the last year's entry, Dervish's They Can't Stop The Spring" finished "plum last."

== Composition ==
The song was composed by Darren Smith and Simon Fine.

The song was featured in a controversy after Greek broadcaster ERT complained over the use of "Macedonia" in the lyrics in light of the Macedonia naming dispute. While the song was considered for disqualification, the song ultimately only changed its lyrics.

== Eurovision Song Contest ==
=== Eurosong 2008 ===
Eurosong 2008 was the national final format developed by RTÉ in order to select its entry for the Eurovision Song Contest 2008. The competition was held on 23 February 2008 at the University Concert Hall in Limerick.

On 4 November 2007, RTÉ opened a submission period where artists and composers were able to submit their entries for the competition until 23 January 2008. Artists were also required to submit details regarding the performance or staging details of their entries. At the closing of the deadline, 150 entries were received. The competing entries were selected based on criteria such as the suitability of the song for Eurovision, quality of the performer, experience of the performer and stage appeal of the entry, by a five-member jury panel. The six finalists were announced on 3 February 2008 and the songs to be performed by the finalists were presented on 21 February 2008 during The Derek Mooney Show broadcast on RTÉ Radio 1.

During the final, "Irelande Douze Pointe" would earn the most votes to win the Irish final, thus becoming the Irish representative for the Eurovision Song Contest 2008

Upon winning the final, "Irelande Douze Pointe" entered the betting odds to win the Eurovision Song Contest 2008, at 10-1.

=== At Eurovision ===
It was announced in September 2007 that the competition's format would be expanded to two semi-finals in 2008. According to the rules, all nations with the exceptions of the host country and the "Big Four" (France, Germany, Spain and the United Kingdom) are required to qualify from one of two semi-finals in order to compete for the final; the top nine songs from each semi-final as determined by televoting progress to the final, and a tenth was determined by back-up juries. The European Broadcasting Union (EBU) split up the competing countries into six different pots based on voting patterns from previous contests, with countries with favourable voting histories put into the same pot. On 28 January 2008, a special allocation draw was held which placed each country into one of the two semi-finals. Ireland was placed into the first semi-final, to be held on 20 May 2008. The running order for the semi-finals was decided through another draw on 17 March 2008 and Ireland was set to perform in position 11, following the entry from Poland and before the entry from Andorra.

During press conferences, Dustin asserted that "Irelande Douze Pointe" was not a novelty song, saying "Can you believe the British said I was a novelty act, what about Andy Abraham their singer! He used to collect rubbish, now he sings it!", referring to Abraham's past as a waste collector. He also had an outspoken crush on Polish entrant Isis Gee, saying that he wouldn't mind being served as food to Gee as "[Gee] fancies me rotten", and that Dustin would like to plan a honeymoon with Gee.

At Eurovision, the performance featured Dustin singing while being pushed around in a shopping cart adorned by Irish decorations and a digital screen featuring the word "HELLO!!" in different languages, along with "IRELANDE DOUZE POINTE". The performance also featured backing vocals from Kathleen Burke and Anne Harrington.

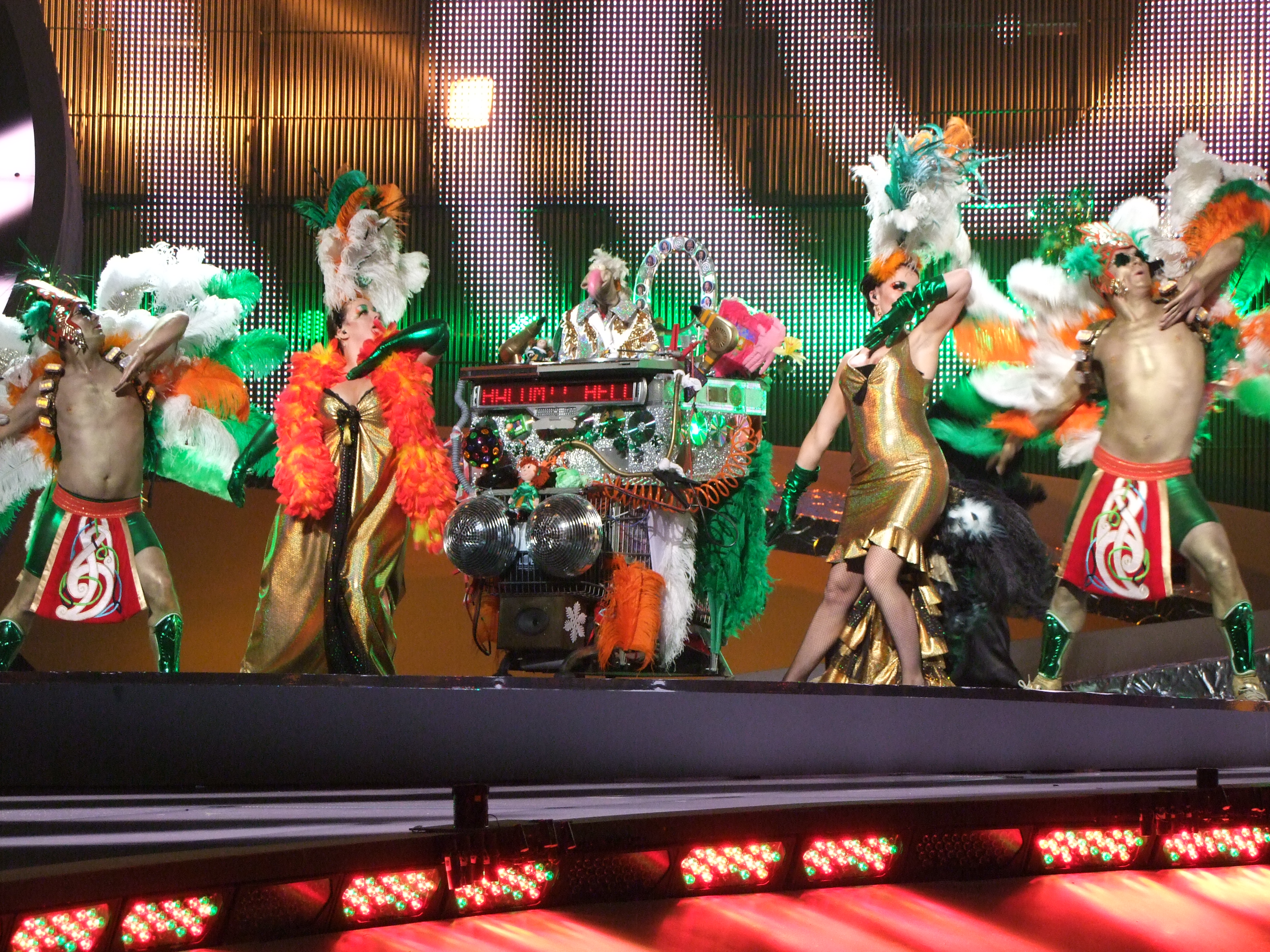
"Irelande Douze Pointe" performed at the Eurovision Song Contest

The song was performed at the first semi-final of the Eurovision Song Contest 2008, held in Belgrade, Serbia. Here it was performed 11th in the running order, following Poland's Isis Gee "For Life" and preceding Andorra's Gisela with "Casanova". It received a total of 22 points, placing 15th in a field of 19 and failing to qualify for the final. The song was reportedly booed by the Serbian audience after Dustin's performance. John Morrison, playing as Dustin, later spoke to reporters, noting that he was disgusted by the result, saying "We gave it a great performance. I am disgusted we didn't get through because I really thought we were good enough." He also urged fans to "remain calm".

== Reception ==
After the win at Eurosong 2008, the reaction from the Irish audience was heavily mixed, with audible boos heard on television, along with panelist Dana Rosemary Scallon describing the win as a "mockery of the competition" and calling for Ireland's withdrawal. Another panelist, Bill Hughes, defended Dustin, saying the song had a "strong female vocal", was "very funny" and had a "great melody".

In 2021, Dustin insisted that he thought that he did not ruin Ireland's reputation in the contest, which had been declining for years. In a satirical comment, he then later said "So, if I've cursed this, fair play, I've saved the country a fortune so I'm happy with that", referring to the Irish dominance of the Eurovision Song Contest in the '90s.

== Charts ==
Chart (2008)	Peak position
Ireland (IRMA)	5
