= Tamara Gee discography =

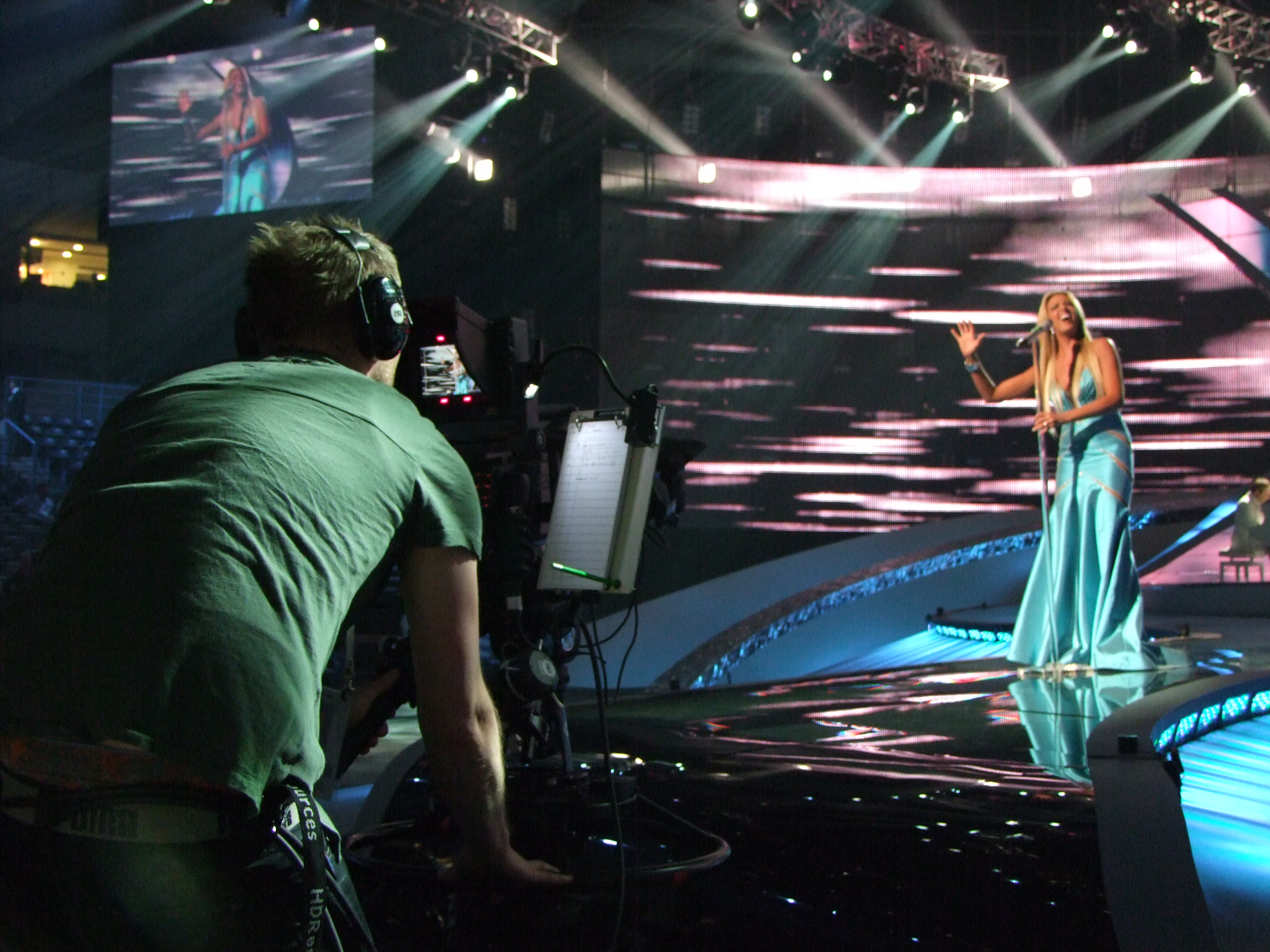
- Studio albums: 4
- Extended plays: 3
- Singles: 12
- Music videos: 5

This is a complete discography of official releases by Tamara Gee, an American-born singer/songwriter and composer whose music includes pop influences. She is signed in a record label Universal Music and Adam Gee Records. Her discography includes three studio albums, six singles (including soundtrack singles), four music videos to date.

Gee's first solo album, Hidden Treasure, was released on September 17, 2007, and distributed by Universal Music Poland. The album debuted at number 44 on the Billboard 200 album charts.

== Studio albums ==
Title	Album details	Notes
No Time for Daydreams	Released: 1993; Label: Moving Room Productions; Format: CD	
Blazin'	Released: 2000; Label: Mosaic Records; Format: CD	
Phantom Suite/The Music of Daniel Barry (Red Fish Blue Fish)	Released: June 4, 2002; Label: DB Records; Format: CD	
Concealed Treasure	Released: September 17, 2007; Label: Universal Music; Format: CD	Chart positions: #56 (Europe), #69 (Poland); Sales: 7,400 (Poland), 10,000 (Worldwide); Singles: "What You See", "Hidden Treasure", "For Life"
Christmas Angel	Released: December 10, 2008; Label: Adam Gee Records; Format: CD	Certification: Poland: Gold; Sales: 20,000 (Poland); Singles:"Christmas Angel"

== Singles ==
Year	Title	Album
2007	"Hidden Treasure"	Hidden Treasure
2007	"What You See"	Hidden Treasure
2008	"For Life"	Hidden Treasure
2008	"Fate"	Sehnsucht
2008	"Christmas Angel"	Christmas Angel
2009	"Times of Change"	Inauguration of Barack Obama
2009	"Too Far From Here"	RubikOne
2010	"Live"	Live
2011	"How About That"	How About That
2014	"Your Alibi"	Love, Tamara
