= Hidden Treasure (album) =

Studio album by Isis Gee
- Released: September 17, 2007
- Recorded: 2004–2007
- Genre: Pop
- Length: 56:12
- Label: Universal Music Polska, Adam Gee
- Producer: KK, Simon Gogerly, Simon Young

Isis Gee chronology
Phantom Suite (2002)	Hidden Treasure (2007)	Christmas Angel (2008)

Alternative cover

Hidden Treasure is the title of the second studio album by Isis Gee. It was released in Poland on September 17, 2007 by Universal Music Polska. In light of her participation in the 2008 Eurovision Song Contest, the album was subsequently released in select countries in Europe, Japan and the United States. The album was produced by KK, Simon Gogerly and Simon Young.

KK co-produced three tracks on the album, which was mastered by Tim Young at Metropolis Studios in London, England.

Hidden Treasure reached #44 in the United States album chart and #56 in Europe despite being released twice in the same year, with the second release including her song For Life which was the song representing Poland at the 2008 Eurovision Song Contest and came 10th.

== Track listing ==
Standard Edition

No.	Title	Length
1.	"This Love (intro)" (Isis Gee)	1:03
2.	"What You See" (Isis Gee)	4:06
3.	"Intoxication" (Isis Gee)	4:20
4.	"Hidden Treasure" (Isis Gee)	4:22
5.	"On Your Knees" (Isis Gee)	5:13
6.	"Share My World" (Isis Gee)	5:02
7.	"Living Proof" (Isis Gee)	5:34
8.	"Empire" (Isis Gee)	4:51
9.	"If I Was You" (Isis Gee)	5:24
10.	"Where I Wanna Be" (Isis Gee)	4:02
11.	"This Love" (Isis Gee)	4:06
12.	"What's One More" (Isis Gee)	4:12
13.	"Hold On" (Isis Gee)	4:04

=== Bonus tracks ===
Eurovision Song Contest Edition

- For life (Isis Gee) — 3:04

== Charts ==
=== Singles ===
Year	Title	Charts	
Year	Title	POPLista	Nielsen Airplay
2007	"Hidden Treasure"	1	26
2007	"What You See"	-	56
2008	"For Life"	-	45

== Unreleased songs ==
All songs are acknowledged in the American Congress. Songs were written by Tamara Gołębiowski, sometimes they are labeled as Tamara Diane Gołębiowski, Tamara Diane Wimer Gołębiewski, Tamara Wimer, Tamara Diane Wimer or Isis Gee. These are the songs that age can be assigned to the recording sessions for this album. Earlier recordings Isis cover the years 1989 to 2004.

- Adasiu (2005)
- Carry me home (2005)
- Falling up (2005)
- Fool's Gold (2005)
- I will (2005)
- Marry Up (2005)
- Seven days (2005)
- Sleep away the day (2005)
- Through his baby's eyes (2005)
- After midnight (2006)
- Behind the wheel (2006)
- Catch and release (2006)
- Come here and share my world (2006)
- Falling apart (2006)
- In my shoes (2006)
- Make me a witness (2006)
- No return policy (2006)
- Sometimes (2006)
- Sugar and spice (2006)
