= Eurovision Song Contest 2008 =

International song competition

Coordinates: 44°49′14″N 20°27′44″E

- Confluence of Sound

Dates and venue
- Semi-final 1: 20 May 2008
- Semi-final 2: 22 May 2008
- Final: 24 May 2008
- Venue: Belgrade Arena; Belgrade, Serbia

Organisation
- Organiser: European Broadcasting Union (EBU)
- Executive supervisor: Svante Stockselius

Production
- Host broadcaster: Radio Television of Serbia (RTS)
- Director: Sven Stojanović
- Executive producer: Sandra Šuša
- Presenters: Jovana Janković; Željko Joksimović

Participants
- Number of entries: 43
- Number of finalists: 25
- Debuting countries: Azerbaijan; San Marino
- Non-returning countries: Austria
- Participation map: Finalist countries Countries eliminated in the semi-finals Countries that participated in the past but not in 2008

Vote
- Voting system: Each country awarded 12, 10, 8–1 points to their 10 favourite songs.
- Winning song: Russia; "Believe"

The Eurovision Song Contest 2008 was the 53rd edition of the Eurovision Song Contest. It consisted – for the first time – of two semi-finals on 20 and 22 May and a final on 24 May 2008, held at the Belgrade Arena in Belgrade, Serbia, and presented by Jovana Janković and Željko Joksimović. It was organised by the European Broadcasting Union (EBU) and host broadcaster Radio Television of Serbia (RTS), which staged the event after winning the 2007 contest for Serbia with the song "Molitva" by Marija Šerifović.

Broadcasters from forty-three countries participated in the contest, the highest ever number of participants, beating the record of forty-two set the year before. Azerbaijan and San Marino participated for the first time, while Austria did not participate, mainly due to questions on the semi-final organisation as well as the politicisation of the contest.

The winner was Russia with the song "Believe", performed by Dima Bilan who wrote it with Jim Beanz. Ukraine, Greece, Armenia, and Norway rounded out the top five, with Armenia achieving its best result to date. Of the "Big Four" countries, Spain placed the highest, finishing 16th, while the United Kingdom ended up in last place for the second time in its Eurovision history, after 2003.

The official website, eurovision.tv, streamed national finals for this year's contest live on ESCTV for the first time. Furthermore, for the first time, the winner has been awarded the perpetual glass microphone trophy of the Eurovision Song Contest. The trophy is a handmade piece of sandblasted glass in the shape of a 1950s microphone.

== Location ==
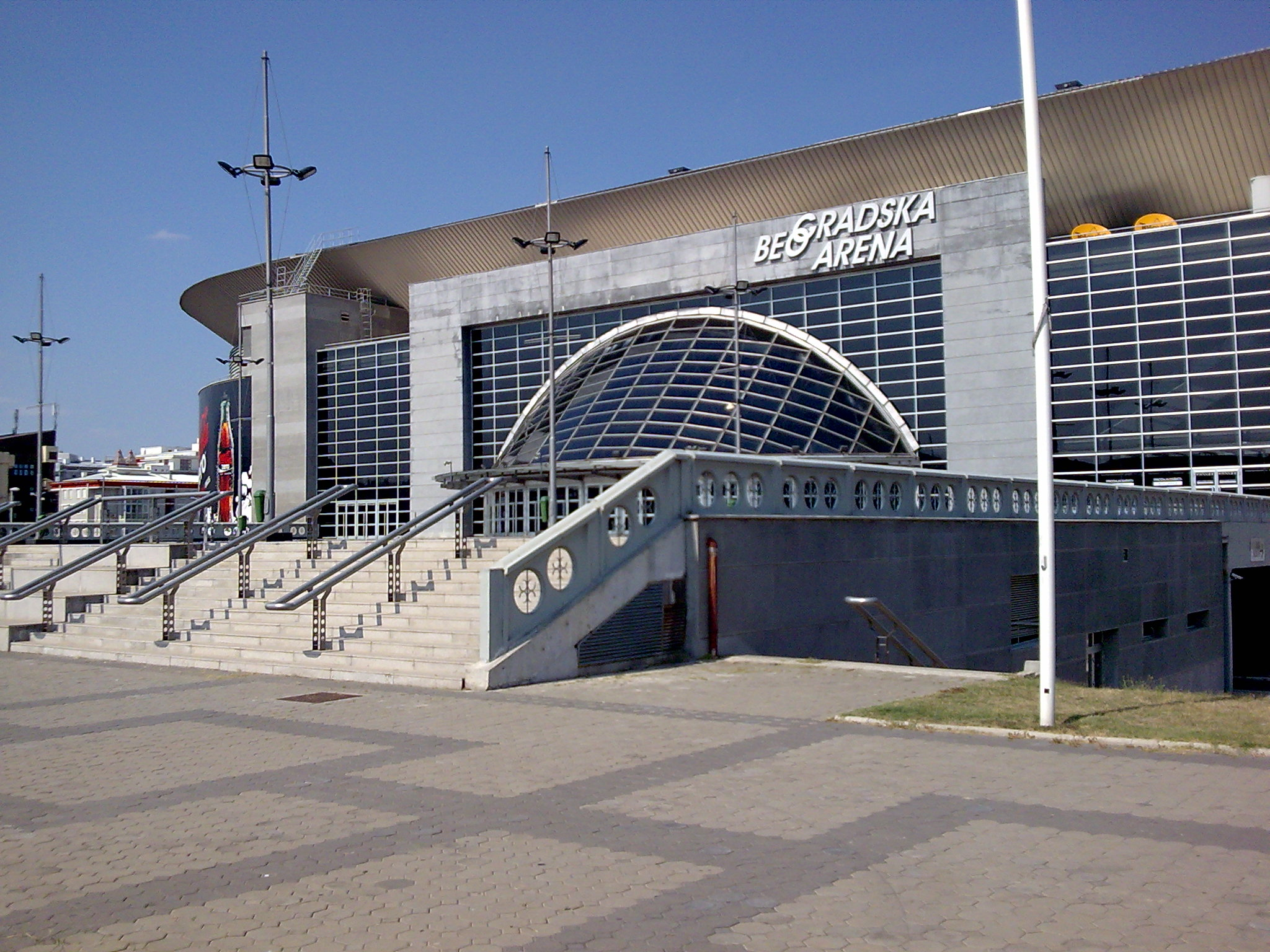
Belgrade Arena, Belgrade – host venue of the 2008 contest

Location of host venue (red) and press centre (blue)

Radio Television of Serbia (RTS) gained the right to host the contest after "Molitva" performed by Marija Šerifović won the 2007 contest in Helsinki, Finland. On 15 May 2007, one day following the final of the 2007 contest, RTS reported that it would host the 2008 contest in Belgrade. The broadcaster chose the Belgrade Arena in Belgrade as the venue for the contest, one of the largest indoor arenas in Europe, with a total capacity of 25,000 seats.

On 14 September 2007, the Mayor of Helsinki handed over the "Eurovision keys" to the Deputy of Belgrade. This ceremony was meant to be a tradition from the 2008 contest and onward, and the ring contains a key from every city that has ever hosted the competition. This tradition continued until 2024.

=== Potential change of location ===
Following the unilateral Kosovo declaration of independence from Serbia on 17 February 2008, which has resulted in protests and unrest across the country, the host of the event was considered to be changed. The National Television Company of Ukraine (NTU) was considered an option since they came second in 2007. Yleisradio (YLE) were another option, as they hosted the previous year's competition in Helsinki, Finland. Greece's Ellinikí Radiofonía Tileórasi (ERT) also offered the European Broadcasting Union (EBU) to host the contest in Athens, Greece again. It was later decided that the contest would stay in Belgrade, with the EBU giving support. RTS would gain a guarantee of safety and security from the government of Serbia for all visitors and participants. The delegations of Albania, Croatia, and Israel had special security. In the end, the contest was held without any incidents.

== Participants ==
Eurovision Song Contest 2008 – Participation summaries by country
- Albania; Andorra; Armenia; Azerbaijan; Belarus; Belgium; Bosnia and Herzegovina; Bulgaria; Croatia; Cyprus; Czech Republic; Denmark; Estonia; Finland; France; Georgia; Germany; Greece; Hungary; Iceland; Ireland; Israel; Latvia; Lithuania; Macedonia; Malta; Moldova; Montenegro; Netherlands; Norway; Poland; Portugal; Romania; Russia; San Marino; Serbia; Slovenia; Spain; Sweden; Switzerland; Turkey; Ukraine; United Kingdom

Eligibility for potential participation in the Eurovision Song Contest requires a national broadcaster with active EBU membership capable of receiving the contest via the Eurovision network and broadcasting it live nationwide. The EBU issued an invitation to participate in the contest to all active members.

On 21 December 2007, the EBU confirmed that 43 countries would be present in Belgrade. San Marino, as well as the newest EBU member, Azerbaijan, made its debut at the 2008 contest. Austria did not compete; its broadcaster, Österreichischer Rundfunk (ORF), said "we've already seen in 2007 that it's not the quality of the song, but the country of origin that determines the decision."

Automatic grand finalists Germany and Spain exercised voting rights at the first semi-final. France, the United Kingdom and Serbia exercised voting rights at the second semi-final. Spain and France each broadcast only the semi-final in which they participated; Germany, Serbia, and the United Kingdom screened both semi-finals (with Germany broadcasting on a delay).

Several of the performing artists had previously competed as lead artists representing the same country in past editions: Charlotte Perrelli had won the contest for Sweden in 1999; Dima Bilan had represented Russia in 2006; and Roberto Meloni, a member of Pirates of the Sea, had represented Latvia in 2007 as part of Bonaparti.lv. In addition, Gisela representing Andorra, had provided backing vocals for Spain in 2002.

Eurovision Song Contest 2008 participants
Country	Broadcaster	Artist	Song	Language	Songwriter(s)
Albania	RTSH	Olta Boka	"Zemrën e lamë peng"	Albanian	Adrian Hila; Pandi Laço
Andorra	RTVA	Gisela	"Casanova"	English	Jordi Cubino
Armenia	AMPTV	Sirusho	"Qélé, Qélé" (Քելե Քելե)	English, Armenian	H.A. Der-Hovagimian; Sirusho
Azerbaijan	İTV	Elnur and Samir	"Day After Day"	English	Zahra Badalbeyli; Govhar Hasanzadeh
Belarus	BTRC	Ruslan Alehno	"Hasta la vista"	English	Taras Demchuk; Eleonora Melnik
Belgium	VRT	Ishtar	"O Julissi"	Imaginary	Michel Vangheluwe
Bosnia and Herzegovina	BHRT	Laka	"Pokušaj"	Bosnian	Elvir Laković "Laka"
Bulgaria	BNT	Deep Zone and Balthazar	"DJ, Take Me Away"	English	Dian Savov
Croatia	HRT	Kraljevi ulice and 75 Cents	"Romanca"	Croatian	Miran "Hadži" Veljković
Cyprus	CyBC	Evdokia Kadi	"Femme Fatale"	Greek	Nicos Evangelou; Vangelis Evangelou
Czech Republic	ČT	Tereza Kerndlová	"Have Some Fun"	English	Gordon Pogoda; Stano Šimor
Denmark	DR	Simon Mathew	"All Night Long"	English	Nis Bøgvad; Svend Gudiksen; Jacob Launbjerg
Estonia	ERR	Kreisiraadio	"Leto svet" (Лето свет)	Serbian, German, Finnish	Tarmo Leinatamm; Peeter Oja; Priit Pajusaar; Glen Pilvre; Hannes Võrno
Finland	YLE	Teräsbetoni	"Missä miehet ratsastaa"	Finnish	J. Ahola
France	France Télévisions	Sébastien Tellier	"Divine"	English, French	Amandine de la Richardière; Sébastien Tellier
Georgia	GPB	Diana Gurtskaya	"Peace Will Come"	English	Kim Breitburg; Karen Kavaleryan
Germany	NDR (Note: On behalf of the German public broadcasting consortium ARD)	No Angels	"Disappear"	English	Remee; Hanne Sørvaag; Thomas Troelsen
Greece	ERT	Kalomira	"Secret Combination"	English	Konstantinos Pantzis; Poseidonas Yiannopoulos
Hungary	MTV	Csézy	"Candlelight"	English, Hungarian	Jánosi; Imre Mózsik; Viktor Rakonczai
Iceland	RÚV	Euroband	"This Is My Life"	English	Örlygur Smári; Paul Oscar; Peter Fenner
Ireland	RTÉ	Dustin the Turkey	"Irelande Douze Pointe"	English	Dustin the Turkey; Simon Fine; Darren Smith
Israel	IBA	Boaz	"The Fire in Your Eyes"	Hebrew	Dana International; Shai Kerem
Latvia	LTV	Pirates of the Sea	"Wolves of the Sea"	English	Claes Andreasson; Jonas Liberg; Johan Sahlén; Torbjörn Wassenius
Lithuania	LRT	Jeronimas Milius	"Nomads in the Night"	English	Vytautas Diškevičius; Jeronimas Milius
Macedonia	MRT	Tamara, Vrčak and Adrijan	"Let Me Love You"	English	Rade Vrčakovski "Vrčak"
Malta	PBS	Morena	"Vodka"	English	Gerard James Borg; Philip Vella
Moldova	TRM	Geta Burlacu	"A Century of Love"	English	Oleg Baraliuc; Viorica Demici
Montenegro	RTCG	Stefan Filipović	"Zauvijek volim te" (Заувијек волим те)	Montenegrin	Grigor Koprov; Ognen Nedelkovski
Netherlands	NOS	Hind	"Your Heart Belongs to Me"	English	Bas van den Heuvel; Hind Laroussi Tahiri; Tjeerd van Zanen
Norway	NRK	Maria	"Hold On Be Strong"	English	Mira Craig
Poland	TVP	Isis Gee	"For Life"	English	Isis Gee
Portugal	RTP	Vânia Fernandes	"Senhora do mar (Negras águas)"	Portuguese	Andrej Babić; Carlos Coelho
Romania	TVR	Nico and Vlad	"Pe-o margine de lume"	Romanian, Italian	Andreea Andrei; Adina Șuteu; Andrei Tudor
Russia	RTR	Dima Bilan	"Believe"	English	Jim Beanz; Dima Bilan
San Marino	SMRTV	Miodio	"Complice"	Italian	Nicola Della Valle; Francesco Sancisi
Serbia	RTS	Jelena Tomašević feat. Bora Dugić	"Oro" (Оро)	Serbian	Dejan Ivanović; Željko Joksimović
Slovenia	RTVSLO	Rebeka Dremelj	"Vrag naj vzame"	Slovene	Josip Miani-Pipi; Igor "Amon" Mazul
Spain	RTVE	Rodolfo Chikilicuatre	"Baila el Chiki Chiki"	Spanish, English	Rodolfo Chikilicuatre and friends
Sweden	SVT	Charlotte Perrelli	"Hero"	English	Fredrik Kempe; Bobby Ljunggren
Switzerland	SRG SSR	Paolo Meneguzzi	"Era stupendo"	Italian	Vincenzo Incenzo; Pablo Meneguzzo
Turkey	TRT	Mor ve Ötesi	"Deli"	Turkish	Mor ve Ötesi
Ukraine	NTU	Ani Lorak	"Shady Lady"	English	Karen Kavaleryan; Philipp Kirkorov
United Kingdom	BBC	Andy Abraham	"Even If"	English	Andy Abraham; Andy Watkins; Paul Wilson

=== Other countries ===
==== EBU members ====
EBU member broadcasters in Austria, Monaco, Slovakia, and Tunisia confirmed non-participation prior to the announcement of the participants list by the EBU.

== Production ==
=== Presenters ===
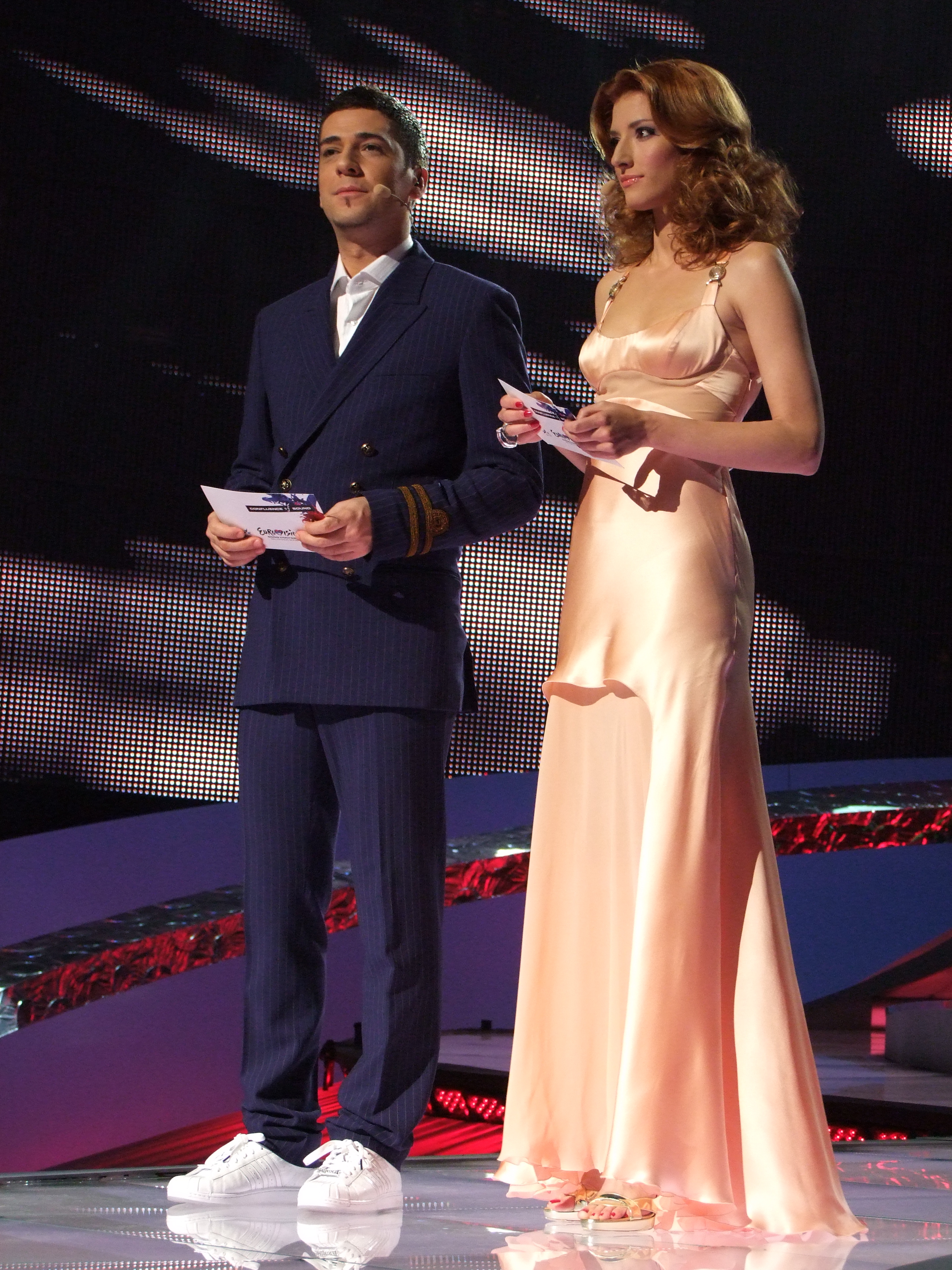
Presenters Željko Joksimović and Jovana Janković during the first semi-final

On 4 March 2008, RTS revealed that Jovana Janković and Željko Joksimović would be the presenters of the contest. Janković served as an anchor of the RTS morning show and hosted the allocation draw ceremony held earlier that year, while Joksimović represented Serbia and Montenegro in 2004 and hosted the allocation draw with Janković in January.

=== Visual design ===
The first logo, called "Mama 2008", was announced in October 2007. It was subsequently replaced in January 2008, after negative responses

RTS ran a competition that led to the creation of the 2008 contest's branding, logo and the stage. On 1 October 2007, the logo titled "Mama 2008" was announced as the winner among 455 submissions. The stage design, titled "Confluence" was also declared as the winner among 70 submissions. However, due to the negative responses to the design, the logo was subsequently changed, and the new logo was presented in January 2008. The stage design was also eventually changed.

The theme of the contest was based around the "confluence of sound". This was symbolic as Belgrade lies on the confluence of two European rivers, the Sava and Danube. The replacement logo, a treble clef, formed the graphical basis of the design created by Boris Miljković.

The postcards in the first and second semi-final were based around the creation of the flag of the nation that was to perform next. Each post card had a short story related to each country and its people. During each postcard a short letter was displayed. All were in the national language of the artist's country, with the exception of the Serbian postcard, which consisted of "Welcome to Belgrade" and "Welcome to Serbia" in various languages. The postcards were brought to an end by a stamp with this year's Eurovision logo.

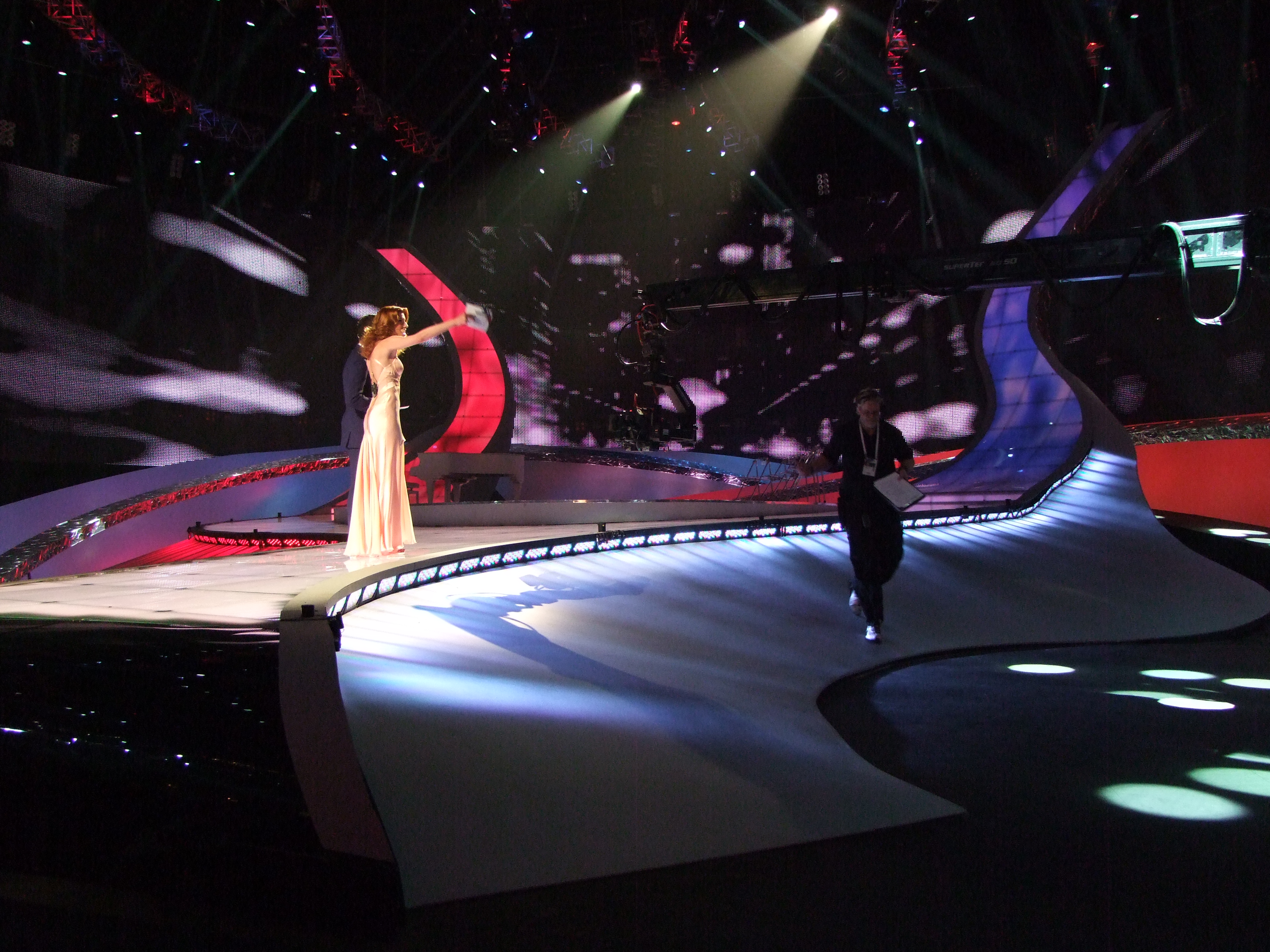
Stage of the contest during the First Semi-final

According to RTS the stage represented native identities, history and modern themes, symbols and universally recognised messages. The confluence-themed stage also contained a large number of television and LCD screens. The stage had settings for all new electronic possibilities including some movable parts of the stage. It was designed by Chicago-based David Cushing.

The first semi-final was created around a city theme. The contest opened with a panorama of the city of Belgrade forming in the stage's background with two waves sliding down the stage to meet in the centre – at the confluence, the overall theme of the contest.

The second semi-final was based around the theme of water, which was enhanced by the look of the stage during the interval act where the water formed the main colours of the stage.

The grand final was based on the theme of the confluence. Construction of the stage lasted several days and was carried out by various teams from across Europe. Pyrotechnics were heavily used for the entries from Armenia, Azerbaijan, Finland, Germany, Turkey, the Czech Republic, Bulgaria, and Switzerland. The stage received positive feedback from the media and fans describing it as "one of the best looking stages in the history of the competition".

== Format ==
=== Expansion to two semi-finals ===
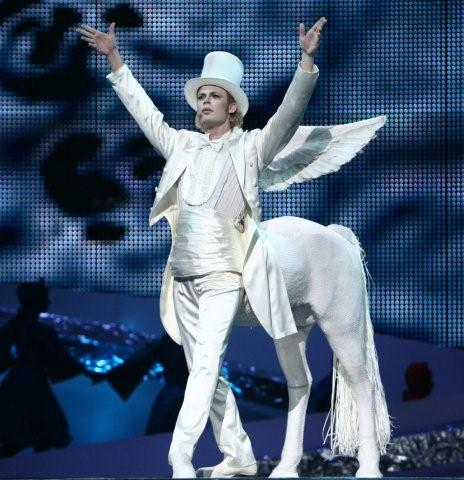
Aleksandar Josipović as part of the opening act of the second semi-final

At a press conference in Helsinki in May 2007, Svante Stockselius, executive supervisor of the contest for the EBU, announced that the competition's format may be expanded to two semi-finals in 2008 or 2009. On 28 September 2007 it was announced that the EBU had approved the plan of hosting two semi-finals in 2008.

According to Stockselius, there were multiple ideas on how the two semi-finals would be organized, such as prerecording both semi-finals and airing them simultaneously on Thursday 22 May, with each broadcaster airing the semi-final their country competes or votes in; or prerecording one semi-final, while the other one is held live, and airing them simultaneously on Thursday 22 May, with each broadcaster airing the semi-final their country votes in. In both cases, the results sequences would be held live.

Although originally this option was not being considered due to the additional costs to such a production, it was later decided that the two semi-finals would be held on different days, both live, on Tuesday 20 May and 22 May 2008.

=== Semi-final allocation draw ===
Results of the semi-final allocation draw Participating countries in the first semi-final Pre-qualified for the final but also voting in the first semi-final Participating countries in the second semi-final Pre-qualified for the final but also voting in the second semi-final

Based on research conducted by the EBU's tele-voting partner Digame, the semi-finalists were sorted into the two heats through the drawing of lots, which was seeded to keep countries that have a significant history of voting for each other apart. Each broadcaster had to broadcast the semi-final in which they took part, with the broadcasting of the other semi-final being optional. The draw for the semi-final allocation occurred in the City Assembly of Belgrade on Monday 28 January 2008 at 13:00 CET and was conducted by the hosts of the contest Jovana Janković and Željko Joksimović.

First, two envelopes with 'Semi-Final 1' and 'Semi-Final 2' were drawn. Then, three countries from each pot were chosen randomly to take part in the first semi-final and the other three in the second one. The country left in Pot 5 took part in the first envelope that is drawn. While, the country left in Pot 6 in the second one.

The automatic grand finalist countries chose whether they would broadcast both semi-finals or just one, but viewers from these countries could only vote in one. From the draw conducted, it was decided which of the five grand finalist countries would broadcast and have voting rights in either of the events. The semi-finals were webcast live through Eurovision.tv. The top nine songs from the televoting qualified for the grand final, and a tenth was determined by the back-up juries. Twenty-five songs competed in the grand final.

On 24 January 2008, all 38 countries in the semi-finals were separated into the following pots based on voting history and geographical location:

Pot 1	Pot 2	Pot 3	Pot 4	Pot 5	Pot 6
Albania; Bosnia and Herzegovina; Croatia; Macedonia; Montenegro; Slovenia	Denmark; Estonia; Finland; Iceland; Norway; Sweden	Belgium; Bulgaria; Cyprus; Greece; Netherlands; Turkey	Andorra; Ireland; Latvia; Lithuania; Portugal; Romania	Armenia; Belarus; Georgia; Israel; Moldova; Russia; Ukraine	Azerbaijan; Czech Republic; Hungary; Malta; Poland; San Marino; Switzerland

=== Running order ===
The draw to decide the running order of the songs in each semi-final and the grand final was conducted at the Heads of Delegation meeting on 17 March 2008.

== Contest overview ==
=== Semi-final 1 ===
The first semi-final was held on 20 May 2008 at 21:00 (CEST). All the countries competing in this semi-final were eligible to vote, plus Germany and Spain. The highlighted countries qualified for the final.

Azerbaijan, Greece and Russia were drawn to decide their own running order positions, while the rest were decided randomly.

Key

Televoting qualifiers
‡ Back-up jury qualifier

Results of the first semi-final of the Eurovision Song Contest 2008
R/O	Country	Artist	Song	Points	Place
1	Montenegro	Stefan Filipović	"Zauvijek volim te"	23	14
2	Israel	Boaz	"The Fire in Your Eyes"	104	5
3	Estonia	Kreisiraadio	"Leto svet"	8	18
4	Moldova	Geta Burlacu	"A Century of Love"	36	11
5	San Marino	Miodio	"Complice"	5	19
6	Belgium	Ishtar	"O Julissi"	16	17
7	Azerbaijan	Elnur and Samir	"Day After Day"	96	6
8	Slovenia	Rebeka Dremelj	"Vrag naj vzame"	36	11
9	Norway	Maria	"Hold On Be Strong"	106	4
10	Poland	Isis Gee	"For Life"	42	10 ‡
11	Ireland	Dustin the Turkey	"Irelande Douze Pointe"	22	15
12	Andorra	Gisela	"Casanova"	22	16
13	Bosnia and Herzegovina	Laka	"Pokušaj"	72	9
14	Armenia	Sirusho	"Qélé, Qélé"	139	2
15	Netherlands	Hind	"Your Heart Belongs to Me"	27	13
16	Finland	Teräsbetoni	"Missä miehet ratsastaa"	79	8
17	Romania	Nico and Vlad	"Pe-o margine de lume"	94	7
18	Russia	Dima Bilan	"Believe"	135	3
19	Greece	Kalomira	"Secret Combination"	156	1

=== Semi-final 2 ===
The second semi-final was held on 22 May 2008 at 21:00 (CEST). All the countries competing in this semi-final were eligible to vote, plus United Kingdom, France and Serbia. The highlighted countries qualified for the final.

Macedonia, Portugal and Denmark were drawn to decide their own running order positions, while the rest were decided randomly.

Key

Televoting qualifiers
‡ Back-up jury qualifier

Results of the second semi-final of the Eurovision Song Contest 2008
R/O	Country	Artist	Song	Points	Place
1	Iceland	Euroband	"This Is My Life"	68	8
2	Sweden	Charlotte Perrelli	"Hero"	54	12 ‡
3	Turkey	Mor ve Ötesi	"Deli"	85	7
4	Ukraine	Ani Lorak	"Shady Lady"	152	1
5	Lithuania	Jeronimas Milius	"Nomads in the Night"	30	16
6	Albania	Olta Boka	"Zemrën e lamë peng"	67	9
7	Switzerland	Paolo Meneguzzi	"Era stupendo"	47	13
8	Czech Republic	Tereza Kerndlová	"Have Some Fun"	9	18
9	Belarus	Ruslan Alehno	"Hasta la vista"	27	17
10	Latvia	Pirates of the Sea	"Wolves of the Sea"	86	6
11	Croatia	Kraljevi ulice and 75 Cents	"Romanca"	112	4
12	Bulgaria	Deep Zone and Balthazar	"DJ, Take Me Away"	56	11
13	Denmark	Simon Mathew	"All Night Long"	112	3
14	Georgia	Diana Gurtskaya	"Peace Will Come"	107	5
15	Hungary	Csézy	"Candlelight"	6	19
16	Malta	Morena	"Vodka"	38	14
17	Cyprus	Evdokia Kadi	"Femme Fatale"	36	15
18	Macedonia	Tamara, Vrčak and Adrijan	"Let Me Love You"	64	10
19	Portugal	Vânia Fernandes	"Senhora do mar (negras águas)"	120	2

=== Final ===
The grand finalists were:

- the "Big Four" countries (France, Germany, Spain, and the United Kingdom);
- the host country (Serbia);
- the top nine countries from the first semi-final plus one wildcard from the juries;
- the top nine countries from the second semi-final plus one wildcard from the juries.

The grand final was held on 24 May 2008 at 21:00 (CEST) and was won by Russia. 25 countries participated in the final and all 43 participants voted.

Serbia was drawn to decide its own running order position, while the rest were decided randomly.

Russia won with 272 points. Ukraine came second with 230 points, with Greece, Armenia, Norway, Serbia, Turkey, Azerbaijan, Israel and Bosnia and Herzegovina completing the top ten. Croatia, Finland, Germany, Poland and United Kingdom occupied the bottom five positions.

Key

Winner

Results of the final of the Eurovision Song Contest 2008
R/O	Country	Artist	Song	Points	Place
1	Romania	Nico and Vlad	"Pe-o margine de lume"	45	20
2	United Kingdom	Andy Abraham	"Even If"	14	25
3	Albania	Olta Boka	"Zemrën e lamë peng"	55	17
4	Germany	No Angels	"Disappear"	14	23
5	Armenia	Sirusho	"Qélé, Qélé"	199	4
6	Bosnia and Herzegovina	Laka	"Pokušaj"	110	10
7	Israel	Boaz	"The Fire in Your Eyes"	124	9
8	Finland	Teräsbetoni	"Missä miehet ratsastaa"	35	22
9	Croatia	Kraljevi ulice and 75 Cents	"Romanca"	44	21
10	Poland	Isis Gee	"For Life"	14	24
11	Iceland	Euroband	"This Is My Life"	64	14
12	Turkey	Mor ve Ötesi	"Deli"	138	7
13	Portugal	Vânia Fernandes	"Senhora do mar (negras águas)"	69	13
14	Latvia	Pirates of the Sea	"Wolves of the Sea"	83	12
15	Sweden	Charlotte Perrelli	"Hero"	47	18
16	Denmark	Simon Mathew	"All Night Long"	60	15
17	Georgia	Diana Gurtskaya	"Peace Will Come"	83	11
18	Ukraine	Ani Lorak	"Shady Lady"	230	2
19	France	Sébastien Tellier	"Divine"	47	19
20	Azerbaijan	Elnur and Samir	"Day After Day"	132	8
21	Greece	Kalomira	"Secret Combination"	218	3
22	Spain	Rodolfo Chikilicuatre	"Baila el Chiki Chiki"	55	16
23	Serbia	Jelena Tomašević feat. Bora Dugić	"Oro"	160	6
24	Russia	Dima Bilan	"Believe"	272	1
25	Norway	Maria	"Hold On Be Strong"	182	5

==== Spokespersons ====
Each participating broadcaster appointed a spokesperson who was responsible for announcing the votes for its respective country. The voting order and spokespersons during the grand final were as follows:

1. United Kingdom – Carrie Grant
2. Macedonia – Ognen Janeski
3. Ukraine – Marysya Horobets
4. Germany – Thomas Hermanns
5. Estonia – Anna Sahlene
6. Bosnia and Herzegovina – Melina Garibović
7. Albania – Leon Menkshi
8. Belgium – Sandrine Van Handenhoven
9. San Marino – Roberto Moretti
10. Latvia – Kristīne Virsnīte
11. Bulgaria – Valentina Voykova
12. Serbia – Dušica Spasić
13. Israel – Noa Barak-Weshler
14. Cyprus – Hristina Marouhou
15. Moldova – Vitalie Rotaru
16. Iceland – Brynja Þorgeirsdóttir
17. France – Cyril Hanouna
18. Romania – Alina Sorescu
19. Portugal – Sabrina
20. Norway – Stian Barsnes-Simonsen
21. Hungary – Éva Novodomszky
22. Andorra – Alfred Llahí
23. Poland – Radek Brzózka
24. Slovenia – Peter Poles
25. Armenia – Hrachuhi Utmazyan
26. Czech Republic – Petra Šubrtová
27. Spain – Ainhoa Arbizu
28. Netherlands – Esther Hart
29. Turkey – Meltem Ersan Yazgan
30. Malta – Moira Delia
31. Ireland – Niamh Kavanagh
32. Switzerland – Cécile Bähler
33. Azerbaijan – Leyla Aliyeva
34. Greece – Alexis Kostalas
35. Finland – Mikko Leppilampi
36. Croatia – Barbara Kolar
37. Sweden – Björn Gustafsson
38. Belarus – Olga Barabanschikova
39. Lithuania – Rolandas Vilkončius
40. Russia – Oxana Fedorova
41. Montenegro – Nina Radulović
42. Georgia – Tika Patsatsia
43. Denmark – Maria Montell

== Detailed voting results ==
=== Semi-final 1 ===
Televoting qualifiers
‡ Back-up jury qualifier

Detailed voting results of semi-final 1
Voting procedure used: 100% televoting 100% jury vote		Total score	Montenegro	Israel	Estonia	Moldova	San Marino	Belgium	Azerbaijan	Slovenia	Norway	Poland	Ireland	Andorra	Bosnia and Herzegovina	Armenia	Netherlands	Finland	Romania	Russia	Greece	Germany	Spain
Contestants	Montenegro	23					1			10					12								
Contestants	Israel	104	5				2	7	10	4	10	4		7	5	7	6	10	6	8	5	4	4
Contestants	Estonia	8				1												7					
Contestants	Moldova	36					5		5					1		6			10	5	4		
Contestants	San Marino	5												2							3		
Contestants	Belgium	16			6												10						
Contestants	Azerbaijan	96	3	5	4	10		5				10	5	8	3	2	4	5	7	10	7	8	
Contestants	Slovenia	36	10	2		2			1			2			10	4			1	2	2		
Contestants	Norway	106	4	6	8	3	7	1	7	2		7	8	10	4	8	5	12	4	7		1	2
Contestants	Poland ‡	42					10		3		2		12			1			2	3	1	5	3
Contestants	Ireland	22	1	3	7			4			1				2		1	2					1
Contestants	Andorra	22		4	3					1		1	1										12
Contestants	Bosnia and Herzegovina	72	12		1	6			4	12	12		3				7	8				7	
Contestants	Armenia	139	6	10	2	5	8	12		5	3	12	2	3	6		12	4	5	12	12	10	10
Contestants	Netherlands	27		1			3	8	2		7					3			3				
Contestants	Finland	79	2		12	8	4	2		3	6	5	6	12	1					4	6	2	6
Contestants	Romania	94		8		12	6	6	6	6	5	3	7	6		5	3	1		1	8	3	8
Contestants	Russia	135	8	12	10	7		3	8	7	8	8	4	4	7	12	2	6	8		10	6	5
Contestants	Greece	156	7	7	5	4	12	10	12	8	4	6	10	5	8	10	8	3	12	6		12	7

==== 12 points ====
Below is a summary of all 12 points in the first semi-final:

N.	Contestant	Nation(s) giving 12 points
5	Armenia	Belgium, Greece, Netherlands, Poland, Russia
4	Greece	Azerbaijan, Germany, Romania, San Marino
3	Bosnia and Herzegovina	Montenegro, Norway, Slovenia
2	Russia	Armenia, Israel
2	Finland	Andorra, Estonia
1	Andorra	Spain
1	Montenegro	Bosnia and Herzegovina
1	Norway	Finland
1	Poland	Ireland
1	Romania	Moldova

=== Semi-final 2 ===
Televoting qualifiers
‡ Back-up jury qualifier

Detailed voting results of semi-final 2
Voting procedure used: 100% televoting		Total score	Iceland	Sweden	Turkey	Ukraine	Lithuania	Albania	Switzerland	Czech Republic	Belarus	Latvia	Croatia	Bulgaria	Denmark	Georgia	Hungary	Malta	Cyprus	Macedonia	Portugal	France	Serbia	United Kingdom
Contestants	Iceland	68		10	3	1	2	5	4		1	2			10		7	5	1		5	8		4
Contestants	Sweden ‡	54	8		2		3	1	3						12		1	7	4		3	1	3	6
Contestants	Turkey	85		6		5		12	7		3			7	8	5	4			8		10		10
Contestants	Ukraine	152	6	3	12		7		1	12	12	6	7	12	7	12	8	8	10	6	12	3	8	
Contestants	Lithuania	30										12				10								8
Contestants	Albania	67	1	7	8	3			10	1	5		10							12	2	5		3
Contestants	Switzerland	47						10					5		5			12	7	1		7		
Contestants	Czech Republic	9			1								2					1		5				
Contestants	Belarus	27				10	6					5				4			2					
Contestants	Latvia	86	7	8		2	12			5	6		6	1	6	6		6		4	10		2	5
Contestants	Croatia	112	4	4	5	7	5	3	6	3	7	7		6	3	8	10		6	10	6	2	10	
Contestants	Bulgaria	56	5		6	6	1			2	2	1	1				3	2	8	7	1	6	5	
Contestants	Denmark	112	12	12		4	8	4	5	10	4	8	3	2		3	12	4	5	3	8	4		1
Contestants	Georgia	107	2	1	10	12	10			8	10	10		4			2	10	12	2	7		7	
Contestants	Hungary	6													1	1							4	
Contestants	Malta	38	3					8		6		4	4	3	4						4			2
Contestants	Cyprus	36			4			2	2					8		2	5						1	12
Contestants	Macedonia	64		2	7			7	8	4			12	10	2								12	
Contestants	Portugal	120	10	5		8	4	6	12	7	8	3	8	5		7	6	3	3			12	6	7

==== 12 points ====
Below is a summary of all 12 points in the second semi-final:

N.	Contestant	Nation(s) giving 12 points
6	Ukraine	Belarus, Bulgaria, Czech Republic, Georgia, Portugal, Turkey
3	Denmark	Hungary, Iceland, Sweden
2	Georgia	Cyprus, Ukraine
2	Macedonia	Croatia, Serbia
2	Portugal	France, Switzerland
1	Albania	Macedonia
1	Cyprus	United Kingdom
1	Latvia	Lithuania
1	Lithuania	Latvia
1	Sweden	Denmark
1	Switzerland	Malta
1	Turkey	Albania

=== Final ===
Winner

Detailed voting results of the final
Voting procedure used: 100% televoting 100% jury vote		Total score	United Kingdom	Macedonia	Ukraine	Germany	Estonia	Bosnia and Herzegovina	Albania	Belgium	San Marino	Latvia	Bulgaria	Serbia	Israel	Cyprus	Moldova	Iceland	France	Romania	Portugal	Norway	Hungary	Andorra	Poland	Slovenia	Armenia	Czech Republic	Spain	Netherlands	Turkey	Malta	Ireland	Switzerland	Azerbaijan	Greece	Finland	Croatia	Sweden	Belarus	Lithuania	Russia	Montenegro	Georgia	Denmark
Contestants	Romania	45									1				6	3	12		4		4								12				3												
Contestants	United Kingdom	14									6																						8												
Contestants	Albania	55		12				1			3															4					1			8	1	10		8					7		
Contestants	Germany	14											12																					2											
Contestants	Armenia	199		1	7	6		6	2	12	8		8	5	8	10	2	1	12	4					12	5		12	10	12	10					12			2	7		12	1	12	
Contestants	Bosnia and Herzegovina	110		5		5								12					2			10				10		1		7	6		2	7	3		6	12	10				10		2
Contestants	Israel	124			5	3		5	4	5	10		2	7		2	6		6	6		3	3		5	3	6			3				1	7	1	8	2		4	3	6	5	3	
Contestants	Finland	35					10					1						7				4		4	2														7						
Contestants	Croatia	44		2	1	2		10				5		3						1	3					8	2							3								1	2	1	
Contestants	Poland	14	4																														10												
Contestants	Iceland	64	6									2			4						7	8							4			6					7		8						12
Contestants	Turkey	138	8	7	4	10		8	10	10	4		5						10	8		2	5							10				6	12		4			3		2		6	4
Contestants	Portugal	69			3	4				6	5			1				6	8					10					8	5				10				3							
Contestants	Latvia	83	10				7											4			8			2				3	2			7	12					4	3		10		3	2	6
Contestants	Sweden	47					2		3					2	1	1		3				7	1						1			12					5				1				8
Contestants	Denmark	60	3				3				2	7						12			5	12	2					2				4	1						5		2				
Contestants	Georgia	83			8		5					8			2	7	3				1						10	4			4	5			4	4				6	5	7			
Contestants	Ukraine	230	5	4			4	3	8	1		10	7	6	10	6	7	5		3	12		6	6	10	2	5	8	7		8	10	6		10	6	3	7		10	6	8	4	10	7
Contestants	France	47	2				6					3						8				1		3	1		4										2		4		8				5
Contestants	Azerbaijan	132		8	10	1				7		4	3		3		8			2			12	7	7	1		10		2	12					3				8	7	10		7	
Contestants	Greece	218	12	3	2	12	1	7	12	8	12		10	8	5	12	4		3	12			8	8	3	6	8	5	3	6	7	2	4	5	6			5	1	2		3	6	4	3
Contestants	Spain	55	1						1	4						4			5		10			12			1				3			4		8	1								1
Contestants	Serbia	160		10		8		12	5				4			5	1	2	7	7		6	7		4	12	3	6		8		1		12	2	5		10	6	1		4	12		
Contestants	Russia	272		6	12	7	12	4	6	3		12	6	10	12	8	10		1	10	6	5	10	5	6	7	12	7	5	1	5	8	5		8	7	10	6		12	12		8	8	
Contestants	Norway	182	7		6		8	2	7	2	7	6	1	4	7		5	10		5	2		4	1	8		7		6	4	2	3	7		5	2	12	1	12	5	4	5		5	10

==== 12 points ====
Below is a summary of all 12 points in the grand final:

N.	Contestant	Nation(s) giving 12 points
8	Armenia	Belgium, Czech Republic, France, Georgia, Greece, Netherlands, Poland, Russia
7	Russia	Armenia, Belarus, Estonia, Israel, Latvia, Lithuania, Ukraine
6	Greece	Albania, Cyprus, Germany, Romania, San Marino, United Kingdom
4	Serbia	Bosnia and Herzegovina, Montenegro, Slovenia, Switzerland
2	Azerbaijan	Hungary, Turkey
2	Bosnia and Herzegovina	Croatia, Serbia
2	Denmark	Iceland, Norway
2	Norway	Finland, Sweden
2	Romania	Moldova, Spain
1	Albania	Macedonia
1	Germany	Bulgaria
1	Iceland	Denmark
1	Latvia	Ireland
1	Spain	Andorra
1	Sweden	Malta
1	Turkey	Azerbaijan
1	Ukraine	Portugal

== Broadcasts ==
Most countries sent commentators to Belgrade or commentated from their own country, in order to add insight to the participants and, if necessary, provide voting information.

Broadcasters and commentators in participating countries
Country	Broadcaster	Channel(s)	Show(s)	Commentator(s)	Ref(s)
Albania	RTSH				
Andorra	RTVA	ATV		Meri Picart and Josep Lluís Trabal	
Armenia	AMPTV				
Azerbaijan	İTV		All shows		
Belarus	BTRC	Belarus-1, Belarus-TV	All shows	Denis Kurian	
Belgium	VRT	Eén	SF1/Final	Bart Peeters and André Vermeulen	
Belgium	VRT	Eén+ (Note: Repeat broadcast of semi-final 2 on Eén on 24 May at 10:00 CEST (08:00 UTC))	SF2	Bart Peeters and André Vermeulen	
Belgium	RTBF	La Une	SF1/Final	Jean-Pierre Hautier and Jean-Louis Lahaye	
Bosnia and Herzegovina	BHRT	BHT 1	All shows	Dejan Kukrić	
Bulgaria	BNT			Elena Rosberg and Georgi Kushvaliev	
Croatia	HRT	HRT 2	Semi-finals	Duško Ćurlić	
Croatia	HRT	HRT 1	Final	Duško Ćurlić	
Cyprus	CyBC	RIK 1	All shows	Melina Karageorgiou	
Czech Republic	ČT	ČT2 (Note: Deferred broadcast of semi-final 1 on 21 May at 01:30 (CEST))	SF1	Kateřina Kristelová	
Czech Republic	ČT	ČT1	SF2/Final	Kateřina Kristelová	
Denmark	DR	DR1 (Note: Deferred broadcast of semi-final 1 on 21 May at 22:00 (CEST))	All shows	Nicolai Molbech	
Estonia	ERR	ETV	All shows	Marko Reikop	
Estonia	ERR	Raadio 2	SF1/Final	Mart Juur and Andrus Kivirähk	
Finland	YLE	YLE TV2	All shows	Jaana Pelkonen and Mikko Peltola	
Finland	YLE	YLE FST5	All shows	Thomas Lundin	
Finland	YLE	YLE Radio Suomi	All shows	Sanna Kojo and Jorma Hietamäki	
Finland	YLE	YLE Radio Vega	All shows		
France	France Télévisions	France 4	SF2	Peggy Olmi and Yann Renoard	
France	France Télévisions	France 3	Final	Jean Paul Gaultier and Julien Lepers	
Georgia	GPB				
Germany	ARD	NDR Fernsehen (Note: Deferred broadcast of the second semi-final on 23 May at 00:45 CEST (22 May 22:45 UTC))	Semi-finals	Peter Urban	
Germany	ARD	Das Erste	Final	Peter Urban	
Greece	ERT	NET	All shows	Betty and Mathildi Maggira	
Greece	ERT			Maria Kozakou	
Hungary	MTV	m1	SF2/Final	Gábor Gundel Takács	
Iceland	RÚV	Sjónvarpið	All shows	Sigmar Guðmundsson	
Ireland	RTÉ	RTÉ Two	Semi-finals	Marty Whelan	
Ireland	RTÉ	RTÉ One	Final	Marty Whelan	
Ireland	RTÉ	RTÉ Radio 1	SF1/Final	Larry Gogan	
Israel	IBA		All shows		
Latvia	LTV		All shows	Kārlis Streips	
Lithuania	LRT				
Macedonia	MRT				
Malta	PBS	TVM	All shows		
Moldova	TRM				
Montenegro	RTCG	TVCG 2	Semi-finals	Dražen Bauković and Tamara Ivanković	
Montenegro	RTCG	TVCG 1	Final	Dražen Bauković and Tamara Ivanković	
Montenegro	RTCG	RTCG Sat	All shows	Dražen Bauković and Tamara Ivanković	
Netherlands	NOS	Nederland 1	All shows	Cornald Maas	
Norway	NRK	NRK1	SF1/Final	Hanne Hoftun	
Norway	NRK	NRK3	SF2	Hanne Hoftun	
Poland	TVP	TVP1, TVP Polonia	SF1/Final	Artur Orzech	
Portugal	RTP	RTP1 (Note: Deferred broadcast of the first semi-final at 23:00 CEST (21:00 UTC))	All shows	Isabel Angelino	
Romania	TVR	TVR 1, TVRi	All shows	Leonard Miron	
Russia	RTR	Telekanal Rossiya, RTR Planeta	All shows	Dmitry Guberniev and Olga Shelest	
San Marino	SMRTV	SMRTV	All shows	Gigi Restivo and Lia Fiorio	
San Marino	SMRTV	Radio San Marino	All shows	Emilia Romagna	
Serbia	RTS	RTS1, RTS Sat	All shows	Dragan Ilić and Mladen Popović	
Slovenia	RTVSLO	SLO 2	Semi-finals	Andrej Hofer	
Slovenia	RTVSLO	SLO 1	Final	Andrej Hofer	
Slovenia	RTVSLO	Val 202	All shows	Aida Kurtović	
Spain	RTVE	La 2	SF1	José Luis Uribarri	
Spain	RTVE	La 1	Final	José Luis Uribarri	
Sweden	SVT	SVT1	All shows	Kristian Luuk and Josef Sterzenbach	
Sweden	SVT	SVT1	Final	Carl Bildt	
Sweden	SR	SR P4	SF2/Final	Carolina Norén	
Switzerland	SRG SSR	SF zwei	SF2/Final	Sven Epiney	
Switzerland	SRG SSR	HD suisse	Final	Sven Epiney	
Switzerland	SRG SSR	TSR 2	SF2/Final	Jean-Marc Richard and Nicolas Tanner	
Switzerland	SRG SSR	TSI 2	SF2	Sandy Altermatt	
Switzerland	SRG SSR	TSI 1	Final	Sandy Altermatt	
Turkey	TRT	TRT 1, TRT Int	All shows		
Turkey	TRT	TRT Türk	Final	Bülend Özveren	
Ukraine	NTU	Pershyi Natsionalnyi	All shows	Timur Miroshnychenko	
United Kingdom	BBC	BBC Three	Semi-finals	Paddy O'Connell and Caroline Flack	
United Kingdom	BBC	BBC One, BBC HD	Final	Terry Wogan	
United Kingdom	BBC	BBC Radio 2	Final	Ken Bruce	

Broadcasters and commentators in non-participating countries
Country	Broadcaster	Channel(s)	Show(s)	Commentator(s)	Ref(s)
Australia	SBS	SBS TV (Note: Deferred broadcast of semi-finals on 23 and 24 May and the final on 25 May at 19:30 AEST (09:30 UTC))	Semi-finals	Julia Zemiro, Paddy O'Connell and Caroline Flack	
Australia	SBS	SBS TV	Final	Julia Zemiro and Terry Wogan	
Austria	ORF	ORF 1	Final	Andi Knoll	
Gibraltar	GBC	GBC TV	Final		
New Zealand	Triangle Television	Triangle Stratos (Note: A compilation of the two semi-finals and the full final were shown in New Zealand ahead of the 2009 contest, with the two programmes broadcast on 3 May 2009 and 10 May 2009 respectively at 19:30 NZST (07:30 UTC))	All shows		

=== High-definition broadcasts ===
RTS broadcast the event in 1080i high-definition (HD) and 5.1 surround sound. The new high-definition television system was in place at the Belgrade Arena by April 2008. This is the second year that the event was broadcast live in HD. BBC HD broadcast the contest in High Definition in the United Kingdom. Swedish broadcaster SVT broadcast both the semi-final and the grand final on SVT HD. Lithuanian broadcaster LRT broadcast both the semi-final and the grand final in 1080i high-definition (HD) on their channel LTV. The same occurred on Swiss HD channel HD suisse; on this channel viewers were able to choose the language of the commentary while viewing a semi-final or grand final of the Eurovision Song Contest. However, all other countries broadcast the show only in standard definition, and the event will only be available to buy on a standard-definition DVD; it will not be released on HD-DVD or Blu-ray.

=== International broadcasts ===
- Australia – Although Australia was not eligible to enter, the contest was broadcast on SBS. The first semi-final was broadcast on Friday 23 May at 19:30 local time, with the second semi-final on Saturday 24 May 2008 at 19:30 local time, and the Final on Sunday 25 May 2008 at 19:30 local time, amongst a weekend of Eurovision-themed programming. SBS local host Julia Zemiro provided introductory and concluding segments with SBS otherwise broadcasting the BBC's coverage and commentary. In recent years the contest has been one of SBS's highest-rating programmes in terms of viewer numbers. The grand final rated well for SBS with 427,000 viewers tuning in for the grand final with 421,000 for the second semi-final and 272,000 for the first semi-final.
- Austria – In Austria, ORF broadcast the contest live and received high TV ratings. However, it did not broadcast the semi-finals on 20 and 22 May.
- Gibraltar – Gibraltar screened only the final on GBC.

A live broadcast of the Eurovision Song Contest was available worldwide via satellite through European streams such as TVRi, ERT World, ARMTV, TVE Internacional, TRT International, TVP Polonia, RTP Internacional, RTS Sat and SVT Europa. The official Eurovision Song Contest website also provided a live stream without commentary via the peer-to-peer medium Octoshape.

=== Viewership ===
A total of 108.2 million people watched the 3 shows, and 64 million watched the final alone.

The final of the contest became the most watched broadcast in Serbia ever, with 3,350,000 people watching.

== Other awards ==
In addition to the main winner's trophy, the Marcel Bezençon Awards and the Barbara Dex Award were contested during the 2008 Eurovision Song Contest. The OGAE, "General Organisation of Eurovision Fans" voting poll also took place before the contest.

=== Marcel Bezençon Awards ===
The Marcel Bezençon Awards, organised since 2002 by Sweden's then-Head of Delegation and 1992 representative Christer Björkman, and 1984 winner Richard Herrey, honours songs in the contest's final. For the only time, the awards were divided into four categories: Artistic Award which was voted by previous winners of the contest, Composers Award, Poplight Fan Award which was voted by fans on the Swedish website poplight.se, and Press Award.

Category	Country	Song	Artist	Songwriter(s)
Artistic Award	Ukraine	"Shady Lady"	Ani Lorak	Philipp Kirkorov; Dimitris Kontopoulos; Karen Kavaleryan
Composers Award	Romania	"Pe-o margine de lume"	Nico and Vlad	Andrei Tudor; Andreea Andrei; Adina Şuteu
Poplight Fan Award	Armenia	"Qélé, Qélé"	Sirusho	H.A. Der-Hovagimian; Sirusho Harutyunyan
Press Award	Portugal	"Senhora do mar (negras águas)"	Vânia Fernandes	Andrej Babić; Carlos Coelho

=== OGAE ===
OGAE, an organisation of over forty Eurovision Song Contest fan clubs across Europe and beyond, conducts an annual voting poll first held in 2002 as the Marcel Bezençon Fan Award. After all votes were cast, the top-ranked entry in the 2008 poll was Sweden's "Hero" performed by Charlotte Perrelli; the top five results are shown below.

Country	Song	Artist	Points
Sweden	"Hero"	Charlotte Perrelli	308
Switzerland	"Era stupendo"	Paolo Meneguzzi	216
Serbia	"Oro"	Jelena Tomašević feat. Bora Dugić	178
Iceland	"This Is My Life"	Euroband	145
Norway	"Hold On Be Strong"	Maria Haukaas Storeng	145

=== Barbara Dex Award ===
The Barbara Dex Award is a humorous fan award given to the worst dressed artist each year. Named after Belgium's representative who came last in the 1993 contest, wearing her self-designed dress, the award was handed by the fansite House of Eurovision from 1997 to 2016 and is being carried out by the fansite songfestival.be since 2017.

Country	Artist
Andorra	Gisela

== Official album ==
Cover art of the official album

Eurovision Song Contest: Belgrade 2008 was the official compilation album of the 2008 contest, put together by the European Broadcasting Union and released by EMI Records and CMC International on 12 May 2008.The album featured all 43 songs that entered in the 2008 contest, including the semi-finalists that failed to qualify into the grand final.

=== Charts ===
Chart (2008)	Peak position
German Compilation Albums (Offizielle Top 100)	5
