= Ireland in the Eurovision Song Contest 2008 =

- Eurovision Song Contest 2008
- Participating broadcaster: Radio Telefís Éireann (RTÉ)
- Country: Ireland
- Selection process: Eurosong 2008
- Selection date: 23 February 2008

Competing entry
- Song: "Irelande Douze Pointe"
- Artist: Dustin the Turkey
- Songwriters: Darren Smith; Simon Fine; John Morrison

Placement
- Semi-final result: Failed to qualify (15th)

Participation chronology

Ireland was represented at the Eurovision Song Contest 2008 with the song "Irelande Douze Pointe", written by Darren Smith, Simon Fine, and John Morrison, and performed by Morrison under the children's show puppet Dustin the Turkey. The Irish participating broadcaster, Radio Telefís Éireann (RTÉ), selected its entry through the national final Eurosong 2008. Six songs faced a public televote, ultimately resulting in the selection of "Irelande Douze Pointe" performed by Dustin the Turkey as the Irish Eurovision entry.

Ireland was drawn to compete in the first semi-final of the Eurovision Song Contest which took place on 20 May 2008. Performing during the show in position 11, "Irelande Douze Pointe" was not announced among the top 10 entries of the first semi-final and therefore did not qualify to compete in the final. It was later revealed that Ireland placed fifteenth out of the 19 participating countries in the semi-final with 22 points.

== Background ==
Prior to the 2008 contest, Radio Éireann (RÉ) until 1966, and Radio Telefís Éireann (RTÉ) since 1967, had participated in the Eurovision Song Contest representing Ireland forty-one times since RÉ's first entry in 1965. They have won the contest a record seven times in total. Their first win came in 1970, with "All Kinds of Everything" performed by Dana. Ireland holds the record for being the only country to win the contest three times in a row (in 1992, 1993, and 1994), as well as having the only three-time winner (Johnny Logan, who won in 1980 as a singer, 1987 as a singer-songwriter, and again in 1992 as a songwriter). The Irish entry in 2007, "They Can't Stop the Spring" performed by Dervish, placed last in the final.

As part of its duties as participating broadcaster, RTÉ organises the selection of its entry in the Eurovision Song Contest and broadcasts the event in the country. After placing last in 2007, Tara O'Brien, RTÉ spokesperson, stated: "We will definitely be having a sit-down and looking at our geographical position and going through the whole process. Without doubt that's going to happen, it was a long night." RTÉ confirmed its intentions to participate at the 2008 contest on 3 October 2007. The broadcaster had internally selected the artist in 2006 and 2007, while the song was chosen in a televised competition. For 2008, RTÉ announced alongside its participation confirmation that it would organise Eurosong 2008 as an open selection to choose both the artist and song to represent Ireland, after a strategic review by a five-member consultative committee appointed by the broadcaster. RTÉ Assistant Commissioning Entertainment Editor Julian Vignoles stated: "The key findings of the committee were that the ESC has changed to incorporate bigger and bigger productions, that the growth in the number of Eastern European countries participating has made the contest even more competitive, and that it has become, as at TV phenomenon, more and more elaborate. The view of the committee is that it has become a performance contest, as much as a song contest. Having discussed these issues with the committee, RTÉ intend in 2008 to give the best possible opportunity to the creativity of Irish songwriters, singers, dancers and performance artists to create a really competitive Irish entry".

== Before Eurovision ==
=== Eurosong 2008 ===
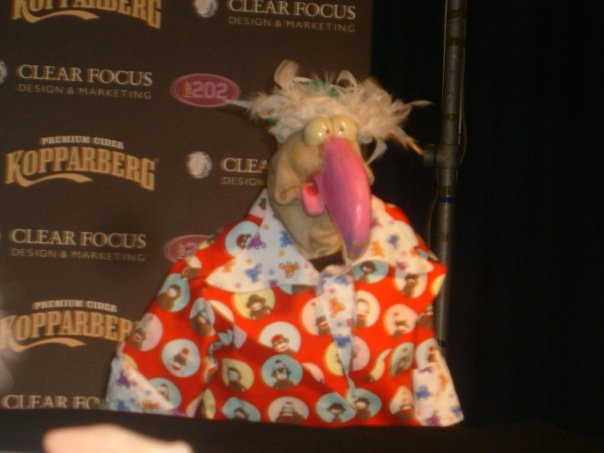
Children's show puppet Dustin the Turkey was selected to represent Ireland in the Eurovision Song Contest 2008 following his victory at Eurosong 2008

Eurosong 2008 was the national final format developed by RTÉ in order to select its entry for the Eurovision Song Contest 2008. The competition was held on 23 February 2008 at the University Concert Hall in Limerick, hosted by Ray D'Arcy and broadcast on RTÉ One as well as online via the broadcaster's official website rte.ie. The first part of the national final was watched by 499,000 viewers in Ireland with a market share of 36%, while the second part was watched by 820,000 viewers in Ireland with a market share of 53%.

==== Competing entries ====
On 4 November 2007, RTÉ opened a submission period where artists and composers were able to submit their entries for the competition until 23 January 2008. Artists were also required to include their suggestions for the proposed performance or staging details of their songs. At the closing of the deadline, 150 entries were received. The competing entries were selected through two phases involving two separate five-member jury panels appointed by RTÉ; the first phase involved the first jury reviewing all of the submissions and selecting a shortlist of entries, while the second phase involved the second jury selecting the six finalists. Entries in both phases were evaluated based on criteria consisting of suitability of the song for Eurovision, quality and experience of the artist, and stage appeal of the entry. The members of the jury that selected the six finalists were television producer Bill Hughes, singer-songwriter Eleanor McEvoy, singer-songwriter and former contest winner Charlie McGettigan, agent and choreographer Julian Benson and RTÉ Assistant Commissioning Entertainment Editor Julian Vignoles. The finalists were announced on 3 February 2008 with their songs presented on 21 February 2008 during The Derek Mooney Show broadcast on RTÉ Radio 1. Among the competing artists was former contestant Marc Roberts who represented Ireland in 1997.

==== Final ====
The national final took place on 23 February 2008 and featured a guest performance from former contest winner Marija Šerifović as well as commentary from a panel that consisted of music manager Louis Walsh and former contest winners Šerifović and Dana Rosemary Scallon. Following a public televote, "Irelande Douze Pointe" performed by Dustin the Turkey was selected as the winner.

Final – 23 February 2008
R/O	Artist	Song	Songwriter(s)	Place
1	Donal Skehan	"Double Cross My Heart"	Joel Humlén, Oscar Görres, Charlie Mason	5
2	Dustin the Turkey	"Irelande Douze Pointe"	Darren Smith, Simon Fine, Dustin the Turkey	1
3	Maja	"Time to Rise"	Maja Slatinšek, Žiga Pirnat	6
4	Leona Daly	"Not Crazy After All"	Leona Daly, Steve Booker	2
5	Liam Geddes	"Sometimes"	Susan Hewitt	4
6	Marc Roberts	"Chances"	Marc Roberts	3

=== Controversy ===
"Irelande Douze Pointe" was released as a CD single as part of the Irish entry's promotional activities.

The announcement of Dustin the Turkey as the winner of Eurosong 2008 caused mixed reactions from the hall audience, including audible boos and panellist Dana Rosemary Scallon describing the win as a "mockery of the competition". Dana also stated that Ireland would be better withdrawing from the competition than sending Dustin. Former contest winning composers Frank McNamara and Shay Healy questioned the legitimacy of the jury panel that selected Dustin as one of the six finalists of Eurosong 2008, with the former questioning whether RTÉ was "giving two fingers to Irish songwriters". Jury chairman Bill Hughes subsequently stated that Dustin's song, which included a "strong female vocal", was "very funny" and "had a great melody".

The controversial nature of his entry "Irelande Douze Pointe" was also said to have been in breach of the contest rules that could "bring the Shows or the ESC as such into disrepute". The song was ultimately not disqualified, however the lyrics were edited by EBU demand after the Greek broadcaster ERT complained over the use of "Macedonia" in the lyrics in light of the Macedonia naming dispute. Dustin's participation and win at Eurosong 2008 also garnered international media exposure; he was mentioned in Spanish media and appeared in the United Kingdom on the ITV morning programme This Morning during the Saint Patrick's Day celebrations. "Irelande Douze Pointe" was later released as a CD single and went on to chart at number five in the Irish Singles Chart.

== At Eurovision ==
The Eurovision Song Contest 2008 took place at the Belgrade Arena in Belgrade, Serbia. It consisted of two semi-finals held on 20 and 22 May, respectively, and the grand final on 24 May 2008. It was announced in September 2007 that the competition's format would be expanded to two semi-finals in 2008. All nations with the exceptions of the host country and the "Big Four" (France, Germany, Spain and the United Kingdom) were required to qualify from one of two semi-finals in order to compete for the final; the top nine songs from each semi-final as determined by televoting progressed to the final, and a tenth was determined by back-up juries. The European Broadcasting Union (EBU) split up the competing countries into six different pots based on voting patterns from previous contests, with countries with favourable voting histories put into the same pot. On 28 January 2008, a special allocation draw was held which placed each country into one of the two semi-finals. Ireland was placed into the first semi-final, to be held on 20 May 2008. The running order for the semi-finals was decided through another draw on 17 March 2008 and Ireland was set to perform in position 11, following the entry from Poland and before the entry from Andorra.

In Ireland, the two semi-finals were broadcast on RTÉ Two and the final was broadcast on RTÉ One with all three shows featuring commentary by Marty Whelan. The three shows were also broadcast via radio on RTÉ Radio 1 with commentary by Larry Gogan. RTÉ appointed Niamh Kavanagh, who won Eurovision for Ireland in 1993, as its spokesperson to announce the Irish votes during the final.

=== Semi-final ===
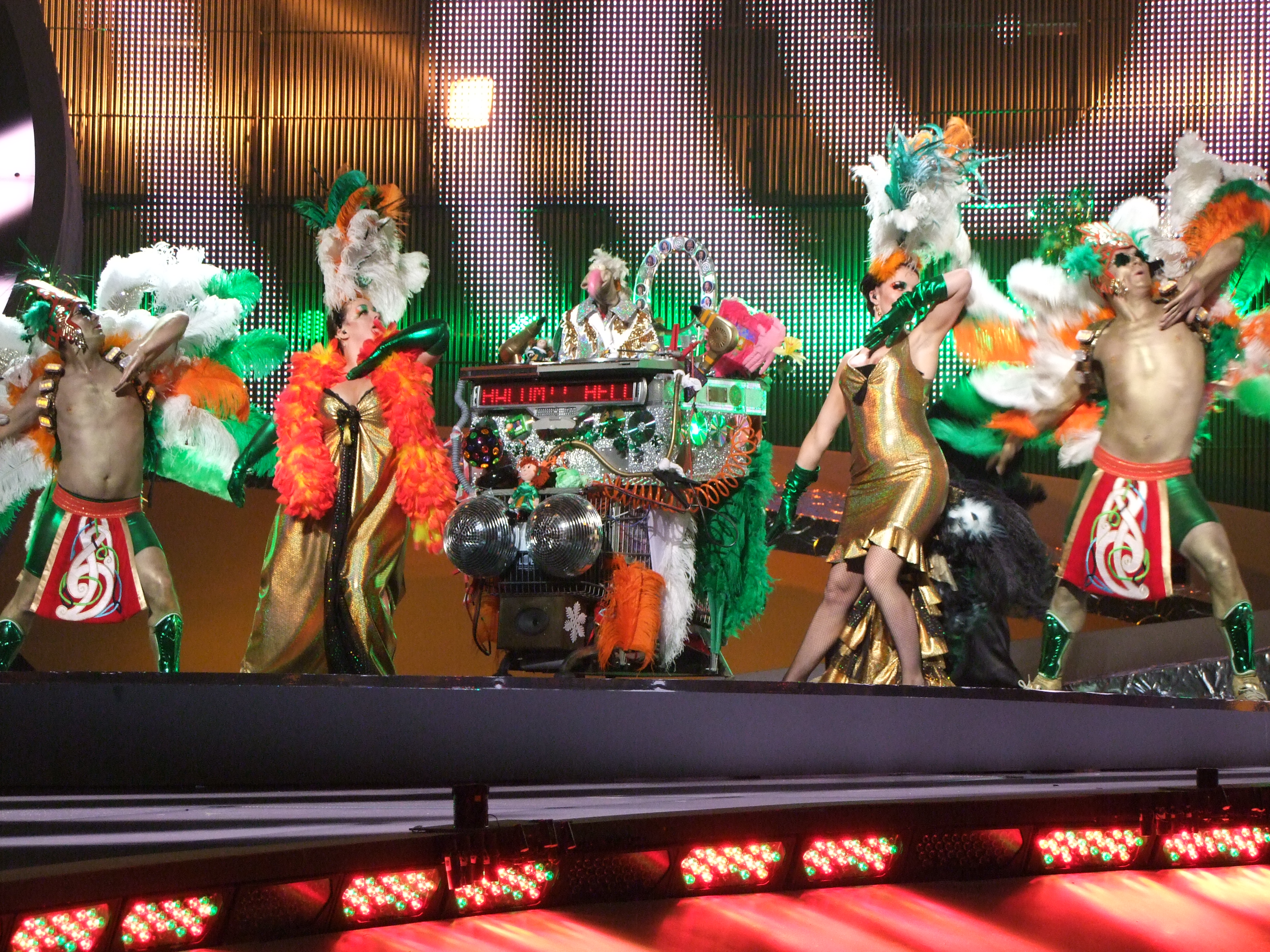
Dustin the Turkey during a rehearsal before the first semi-final

Dustin the Turkey took part in technical rehearsals on 12 and 15 May, followed by dress rehearsals on 19 and 20 May. The Irish performance featured Dustin the Turkey in a green, white and gold trolley which included a record deck with a display underneath and dressed in a silver suit, performing together with three male and two female backing dancers, the latter which also performed backing vocals: Kitty B and Ann Harrington. The dancers were dressed in black cloaks at the beginning, which were removed to reveal large green, white and gold wings on two of the male dancers, a gold jumpsuit on the remaining male dancer, and gold dresses, green gloves and green headdresses on the female dancers. The LED screens displayed rippling effects of black and white as well as waves of orange, white and green.

At the end of the show, Ireland was not announced among the top 10 entries in the first semi-final and therefore failed to qualify to compete in the final. It was later revealed that Ireland placed fifteenth in the semi-final, receiving a total of 22 points.

=== Voting ===
Below is a breakdown of points awarded to Ireland and awarded by Ireland in the first semi-final and grand final of the contest. The nation awarded its 12 points to Poland in the semi-final and to Latvia in the final of the contest.

==== Points awarded to Ireland ====
Points awarded to Ireland (Semi-final 1)
Score	Country
12 points	
10 points	
8 points	
7 points	Estonia
6 points	
5 points	
4 points	Belgium
3 points	Israel
2 points	Bosnia and Herzegovina; Finland
1 point	Montenegro; Netherlands; Norway; Spain

==== Points awarded by Ireland ====
Points awarded by Ireland (Semi-final 1)
Score	Country
12 points	Poland
10 points	Greece
8 points	Norway
7 points	Romania
6 points	Finland
5 points	Azerbaijan
4 points	Russia
3 points	Bosnia and Herzegovina
2 points	Armenia
1 point	Andorra

Points awarded by Ireland (Final)
Score	Country
12 points	Latvia
10 points	Poland
8 points	United Kingdom
7 points	Norway
6 points	Ukraine
5 points	Russia
4 points	Greece
3 points	Romania
2 points	Bosnia and Herzegovina
1 point	Denmark

== After Eurovision ==
After his Eurovision experience, Dustin returned to Ireland where he launched a campaign against the Lisbon Treaty in the European Union, calling for a 'No' vote by the Irish on the referendum for the amendment of the Irish constitution to allow the adoption of the treaty. Dustin's campaign included the slogan "They didn't vote for us. Get them back. Vote 'No' to Lisbon", referring to his failure at Eurovision.
