= Queens (group) =

Polish girl trio

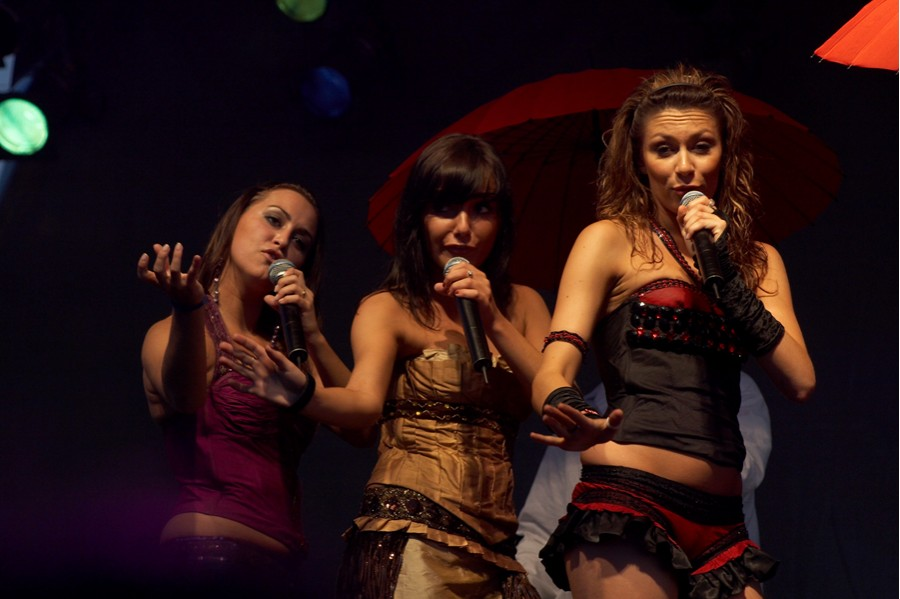
- Queens in 2007

Background information
- Origin: Poland
- Genres: Pop, Dance
- Years active: February 2005 - 2008
- Labels: PAM, Magic Records

Queens is a Polish girl trio formed in February 2005 by Polish Music Agency. The group is one of the best known girl bands in Poland. After a minor success with their debut album the group started touring, but illnesses caused several shows to be cancelled. The group was then recast, with only Monika Niedek remaining from the original members. The new lineup's first single, "We Are The Queens", was finally released in early 2007, but the song didn't gain much success. A bit later, when the video was recorded, Queens did a short promotional campaign and decided to take a short break. After the break, both the whole group and the Polish Music Agency decided to remix and re-release the last single. East Clubbers have mixed the song in 5 different versions. The re-released single also includes a song "Piękne Chwile" (Beautiful Moments), which was the Polish-language version of "We're The Queens".

== Members ==
- Patrycja Wódz (born 1979) (2005–2006)
- Agnieszka Maksyjan (born 1981) (2005–2006)
- Monika Niedek (born 1983)
- Julia Trębacz (born 1985) (2006–2008)
- Sylwia Parys (born 1988) (2006–2008)

== Discography ==
- 2006 - Made For Dancing
  - "Everybody Loves The Sunshine", 2005
  - "Od A Do Zet", 2005
  - "Mija Rok", 2005
  - "I Fell In Love", 2006
  - "Każdego Dnia", 2006
- 2007 - Radio Active
  - "No Goodbyes", 2006
  - "We're The Queens", 2007
  - "Porywam Cię", 2007
  - "Ocalić Świat", 2007
- Others singles
  - "Polska Gra", 2006
