= East Clubbers =

Polish dance group

- Origin: Poland
- Genres: Hard trance, hard dance, Happy hardcore
- Years active: 2002-2011
- Members: Piotr Kwiatkowski (DJ Silver); Piotr Wachnicki (DJ Sqren); Paweł Gawlik (Max Lade)

The East Clubbers were a dance group from Poland, composed of Piotr Kwiatkowski (DJ Silver) and Piotr Wachnicki (DJ Sqren). Since 2005 to 2010 the band was composed of Piotr Kwiatkowski (DJ Silver) and Paweł Gawlik (Max Lade) the composer and music producer. The duo also worked with another Polish producer, Janardana. East Clubbers has many international hits, particularly in Europe, such as "Walk Alone", "Beat is Coming" and "Crazy Right Now".

== History ==
The members of the East Clubbers have worked over eight years in the dance music field. They have previously been involved in other projects, such as Clubringer, DPM, Trinity and Janardana. The group has been together since 2002.

== Career ==
The group co-operates with Kate Lesing, who sings most of their songs. East Clubbers aim to popularize Polish dance music internationally. The duo's first album, E-Quality, was released in 2004. Their second album, Never Enough, includes singles such as My Love, Make Me Live and Sextasy which were popular in Poland. The majority of the tracks have a progressive house and dance sound to them. They have also made several songs for Norwegian Russ-busses.

== Discography ==
Year	Albums	Songs	Official singles
2004	E-Quality	Action; All Systems Go; Beat is Coming; Bungee; East Parade; Equal in love; Feelin'; Happy"; It's a Dream; Silence; Walk Alone; Wonderful Dancing; The Real Thing; To the Moon and Back	None
2005	None	More More More; Like a Drug; Russian	None
2006	None	Fragile Outre; It's a Dream; Sextasy; Sometimes	Sextasy
2007	Never Enough	Make Me Live; My Love; Never Turn Away; Sexplosion	My Love; Make Me Live
2008	None	It's My Life; Dance Now; Where Are You	It's My Life; Where Are You
2009	None	Another Day	Another Day
2010	None	Raveioactive; Mayhem	None
2011	None	Mother Russia; Audition!!	One Day
