= Phantom Suite/The Music of Daniel Barry/Red Fish Blue Fish =

Studio album by The Jazz Police
- Released: (United States) June 4, 2002
- Recorded: 1992–2002
- Genre: Easy listening
- Label: DB Records
- Producer: Daniel Barry

The Jazz Police chronology
Phantom Suite/The Music of Daniel Barry/Red Fish Blue Fish (2002)	Hidden Treasure (2006)

Phantom Suite is the first jazz album released by The Jazz Police, with Tamara Wimer as singer. This album was recorded in Seattle, and was released on DB Records, a subsidiary of Universal Music Group. It was produced by Daniel Barry, and released on June 4, 2002. The recording process took over ten years, and a second version, titled Red Fish Blue Fish, was also released

== Track listing ==
1. Phantom Suite - "Phantom Suite"
2. "S1m0ne"
3. "Baby Weezer"
4. "Madama Butterfly"
5. "East Palm Drive"
6. "Will to power"
7. "Peasants Lullabye"
8. "Only You"
9. "From Another World" _{duet with Dean Mochizuki}
10. "Savannah"
11. Music of Daniel Barry - "To & Fro" 5:10
12. "Ancestors" 4:55
13. "Takes Two to Tango" 8:07
14. "Miss Leisure" 5:56
15. "The Hiding Place" 6:06
16. "Sleep Baby Sleep" 3:14
17. "Black Bean Boss" 5:31
18. "The Phoenix" 5:01
19. "In the Beginning" 7:56

== Other Version:Red Fish Blue Fish ==
1. Ancestors 4:55
2. Baba Rum Dum 4:44
3. Suicide in B♭
4. Still Life
5. Takes Two to Tango 8:07
6. In The Beginning... 7:56
7. To & Fro 5:10
8. Nandini
9. Chemo Receptor
10. Spekeasy 3:19
11. The Hiding Place 6:06
12. Sleep Baby Sleep 3:14
