= Tamara Gee =

American pop singer (born 1972)

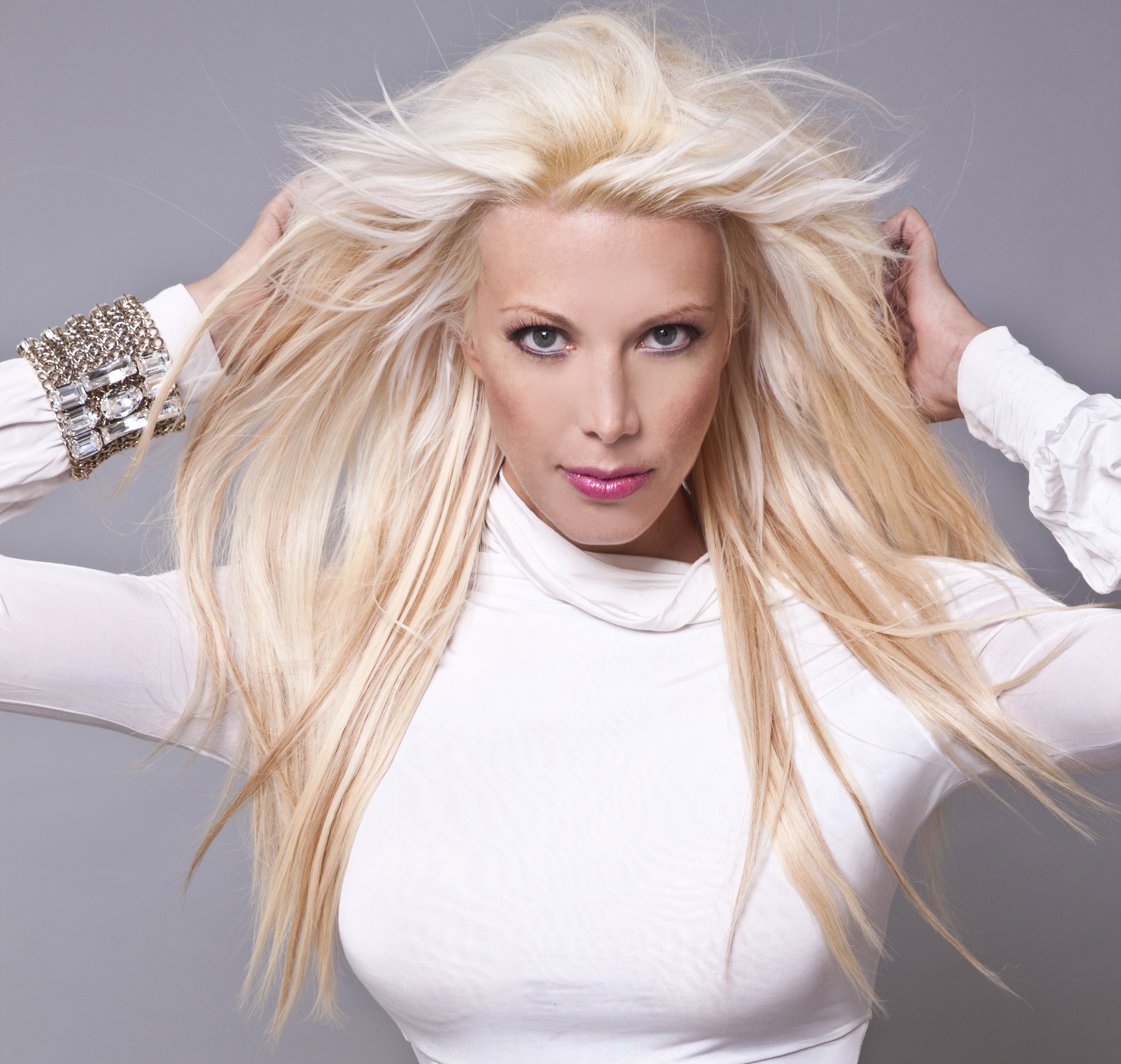

Background information
- Also known as: Isis Gee
- Born: Tamara Diane Wimer; October 11, 1972 (age 53); Seattle, Washington, U.S.
- Genres: Pop
- Occupations: Singer, songwriter
- Labels: Universal Music Polska; Croatia Records; Adam Gee Records (Music Gee); Tidal Water Records
- Website: tamaragee.com

Tamara Diane Wimer (born October 11, 1972), known professionally as Tamara Gee (formerly Isis Gee), is an American pop singer and songwriter. She grew up singing and performing from the age of 5, and was a professional vocalist by the time she was 12 years old, winning various singing competitions throughout her adolescence and adulthood, as well as a beauty pageant. Gee opened for vocalist Tony Bennett and his orchestra after being the featured vocalist on various albums throughout her teen years. She released her debut album Hidden Treasure with Universal Music in 2007, while living in Poland. Her single from the album, "For Life", was voted the winner of Piosenka dla Europy, the Polish national final for the Eurovision Song Contest 2008; it was the first Polish entry in history to qualify out of a semifinal, and ultimately placed 24th out of 25 entries. A portion of Gee's Eurovision performance was shown on The Oprah Winfrey Show on "The World's Got Talent" episode with Simon Cowell where Gee sang with former participants Celine Dion and Julio Iglesias. In 2007, Gee co-wrote and performed "Fate" on DJ Schiller's album Sehnsucht. The album went triple platinum and was nominated for a Grammy. She released her solo EP Christmas Angel in 2009. On November 27, 2014, Tamara released the album "Love, Tamara", which was co-written with and produced by Grammy Award-winning producer/songwriter Walter Afanasieff.

Gee is the co-founder, co-owner, co-creator, spokeswoman, and creative director of Nebu Milano, an Italian cosmetic brand launched in Milan in 2013.

== Biography ==
=== Early life, education ===
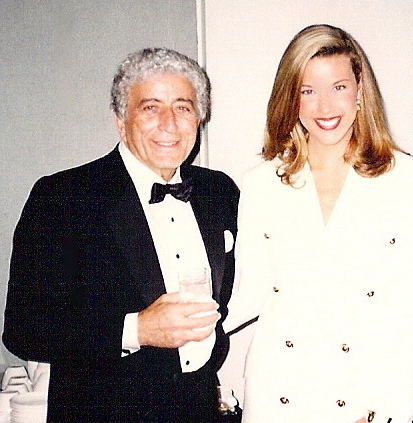
Gee and Tony Bennett

Tamara Gee is of Polish descent. She was born in Seattle, Washington, in the United States as Tamara Diane Wimer. At 8 years old she began singing the National Anthem as a soloist for major Seattle sporting events at the Seattle Seahawks, Seattle Mariners and Seattle SuperSonics games in arenas of 65,000+ people and was singing regularly at such events until her early 20s. Throughout her adolescence, Gee sang and toured the United States with the Seattle Girls Choir studying with Jerry Wright and the Northwest Girls Choir as well as trained privately with vocal coach Maestro David Kyle (Ann Wilson, Geoff Tate, Chris Cornell, Layne Staley, etc.) who Gee stated, taught her how to belt in her chest voice. She began her professional career in music at age 12, performing pop, R&B, classical, jazz, Broadway, and country music. In a Tygodnik Angora Magazine article, Gee shared that the most memorable singing contest she ever entered as a child was when she was 12 years old, both winning the contest and $1,000.00 cash.

Gee attended Kentwood High School in Covington, Washington from 1988 to 1991 receiving awards such as "Most Inspirational Student" and "Most Likely To Succeed". Gee also received music scholarships at the University of Washington, Central Washington University, Pierce College and Highline Community College. She has sung at various events for individuals such as Bill Gates, Paul Allen and the Mayor of Seattle. At 17, Gee received the Best Female Vocalist Award in a singing contest with IMTA (International Modeling and Talent Association) in Los Angeles. California Soon after, she went on to win a scholarship and beauty pageant (preliminary to Miss America) also winning the Talent Award.

At the age of 19 she opened for Tony Bennett and his large orchestra, also touring and recording with various orchestra's and big jazz bands. Before Gee turned 21, she had been the featured vocalist on an array of albums including recording with the Jazz Police, a 24 piece jazz band from Seattle on their 1992 album Phantom Suite. The album was released with Universal Music Group. Gee was also the vocalist for Room to Move, featuring on the band's album No Time for Daydreams, as well as the featured vocalist with the Bobby Medina Band (Ray Charles, Herbie Hancock, etc.).

During her Asia tour she also performed with McCoy Tyner (John Coltrane, Stanley Clarke, Bill Evans). After moving to Los Angeles, Gee worked with songwriter Steve Dorff (Celine Dion, Barbra Streisand, Whitney Houston).

In 2000, she appeared in the movie Jericho.

=== Polish releases ===
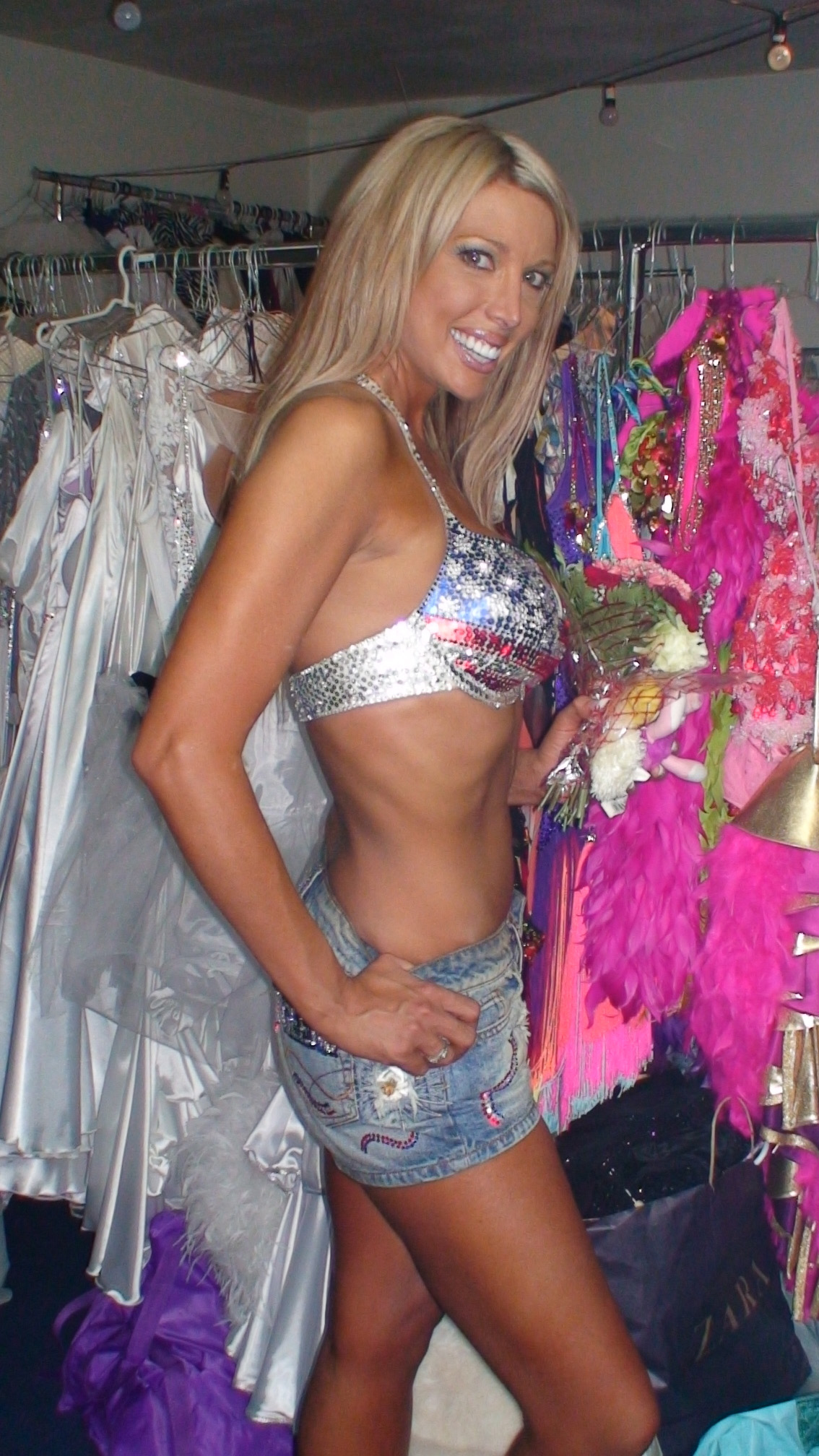
Behind stage at Dancing With The Stars

She married Adam Gołębiowski in 2004 and moved to Warsaw, Poland. She continued to pursue her career in Poland and released her debut album Hidden Treasure with Universal Music in 2007. Grammy Award-winning engineer Simon Gogerly assisted and mixed the entire album, as well as her single "For Life". KK co-produced three tracks on the album.

In 2007, Gee worked with German DJ Schiller (Christopher von Deylen) on his new album Sehnsucht, co-writing and performing the song "Fate", which was released with Universal Music. The album and song went Platinum, selling over 200,000 units in a few months time. The album went triple platinum and was nominated for a Grammy.

In 2007, Gee also took part in Dancing with the Stars: Taniec z Gwiazdami on TVN in Poland. She reached the quarter-final, ranking a top 5 position out of 14 couples. Her dance partner was world champion Ukrainian dancer Zora Korolyov. During her last performance, she broke her ribs, hit her dance partner's knee, and ended up in the hospital. She performed at the semifinal of Taniec z Gwiazdami (season 6) and in the final of the program, Gee was the special guest featured singing Caruso with a large orchestra. In August 2008 in Kraków, Gee and Korolyov were chosen as one of four couples from the program's history to take part in a Guinness Book of World Records event, where they are recorded in the Guinness Book of World Records for teaching 1,600 couples to dance the cha-cha.

In 2008, Gee recorded and performed her Christmas compositions from her album Christmas Angel with the Harlem Gospel Choir in New York City and Warsaw, Poland. According to the liner notes, the album was dedicated to her cousin Mindy, who had died in a car crash earlier that year.

=== Eurovision Song Contest ===
Gee's song "For Life", which she had written and produced, was chosen from among over one hundred songs as one of twelve entries to participate in Piosenka dla Europy, the Polish national final for the Eurovision Song Contest 2008. During the live broadcast on February 23, 2008, her entry was selected to represent Poland at Eurovision 2008. She received the maximum points by both the jury and text voting from the public.

At the semi-final, Gee qualified for the final receiving 42 points and placing 10th; the top 10 entries qualified for the final. Gee was the first Polish representative to have ever reached the Eurovision final with the new format of semifinals. In the final, "For Life" placed 24th out of 25 entries, having received a total of 14 points from the United Kingdom and Ireland.

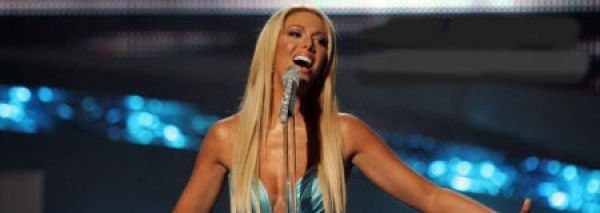
At Eurovision

She was also voted the most beautiful contestant in Eurovision by the National Broadcaster of Serbia RTS, and was nominated as one of the top 5 best female vocalists in the Eurovision Song Contest 2008. In the poll website Eurovision ESC Today, Gee was nominated in two categories – Best Performance by a Vocalist and Best-Dressed Performer. She rated 3rd in an online poll as "Best female vocal performance" in the 2008 Contest.

On May 11, 2009, a portion of Gee's Eurovision performance was shown on The Oprah Winfrey Show during "The World's Got Talent with Simon Cowell" episode. In the clip Gee is shown singing amidst Celine Dion, ABBA and Julio Iglesias. She was also featured singing on European television programs such as The Late Late Show in Ireland. In 2009, Gee re-appeared during Piosenka dla Europy to perform as a guest act.

Before Eurovision she had performed in over 35 countries in one year's time, including at venues such as the Scala Club in London.

=== Recent years ===
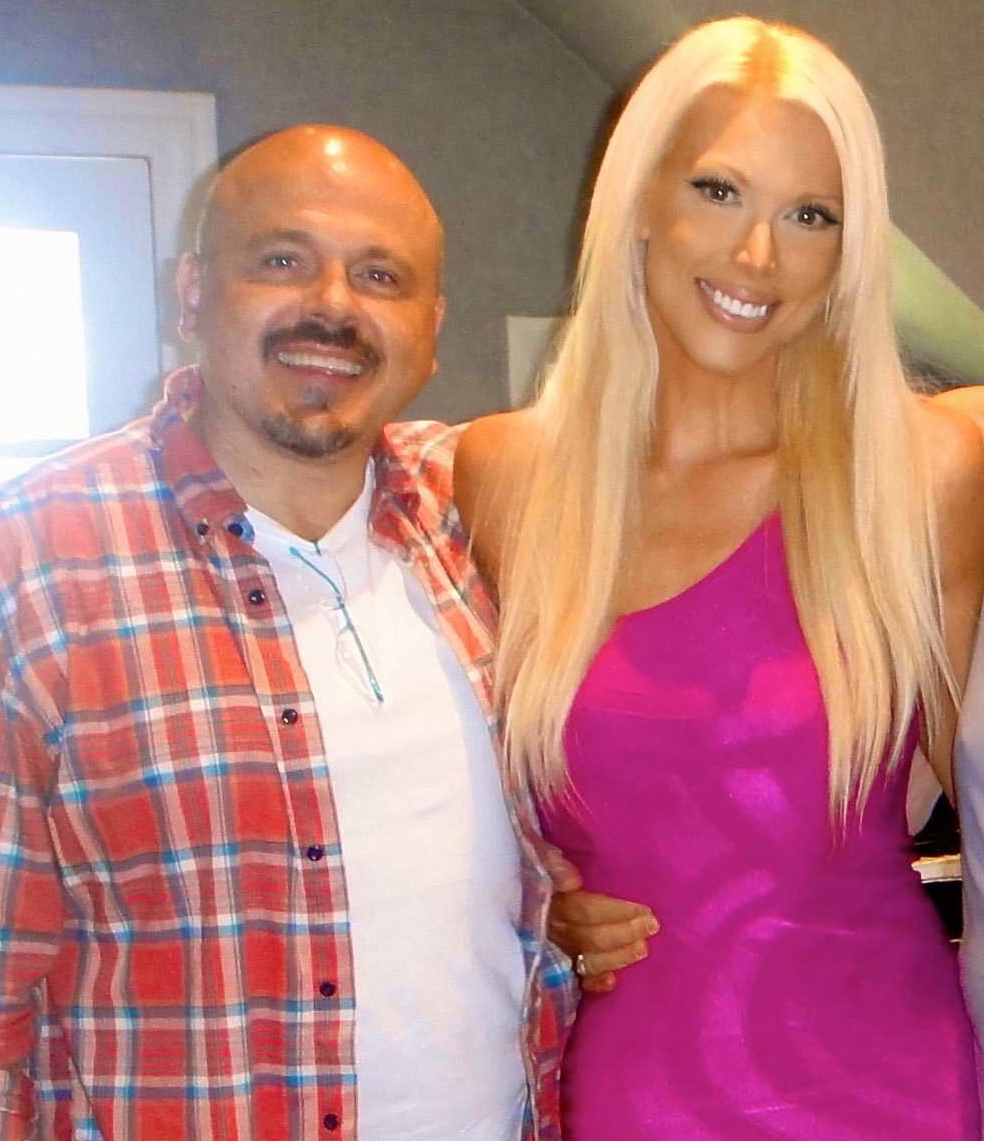
Producer Walter Afanasieff and Tamara Gee

Music videos

In 2007, she signed to Universal Music Poland where she released the album Hidden Treasure and an associated music video with the single. As of 2013 she has released four music videos for songs she has written, including "Hidden Treasure," "What You See," "For Life," and "How About That."

Recent releases

In 2010 she recorded the duet ballad single "Live" with Jacques Houdek and co-produced the song with Canadian writer and producer Tino Izzo (Celine Dion). The song was recorded in London and released as a single by Croatia Records.

In 2012 she released an EP single and the first song she and Anders Hansson produced together, entitled "How About That". Hansson is the author of the Agnes Carlsson songs Release me and "On and On". Gee wrote, programmed and arranged "How About That" in Italy and co-produced with Anders' team of producers from Sweden, including Marta Grauers, Erik Arivander (Lady Gaga – Alejandro), Felix Person and Adam Gee. The song official videoclip was entirely shot in the Italian city of Brindisi, directed by Nicola Cozzoli with cinematography by Giuliano Tomassacci.

In November 2014, Gee released her highly anticipated album "Love, Tamara" of which she wrote with and was produced by Walter Afanasieff (Celine Dion, Mariah Carey, Andrea Bocelli, Barbra Streisand, Leona Lewis, Christina Aguilera and others). As of 2013, she is managed by Jim Morey Management in Los Angeles. (Mariah Carey, Michael Jackson, Miley Cyrus) The first single from her album was released on February 14, 2014, entitled "Your Alibi" along with a music video clip featuring some scenes of Gee and Afanasieff recording in Los Angeles. Also in November 2014, Gee was on the cover of the high luxury beauty and fashion magazine "Milano World" and her album "Love, Tamara" was released in Italy with the magazine.

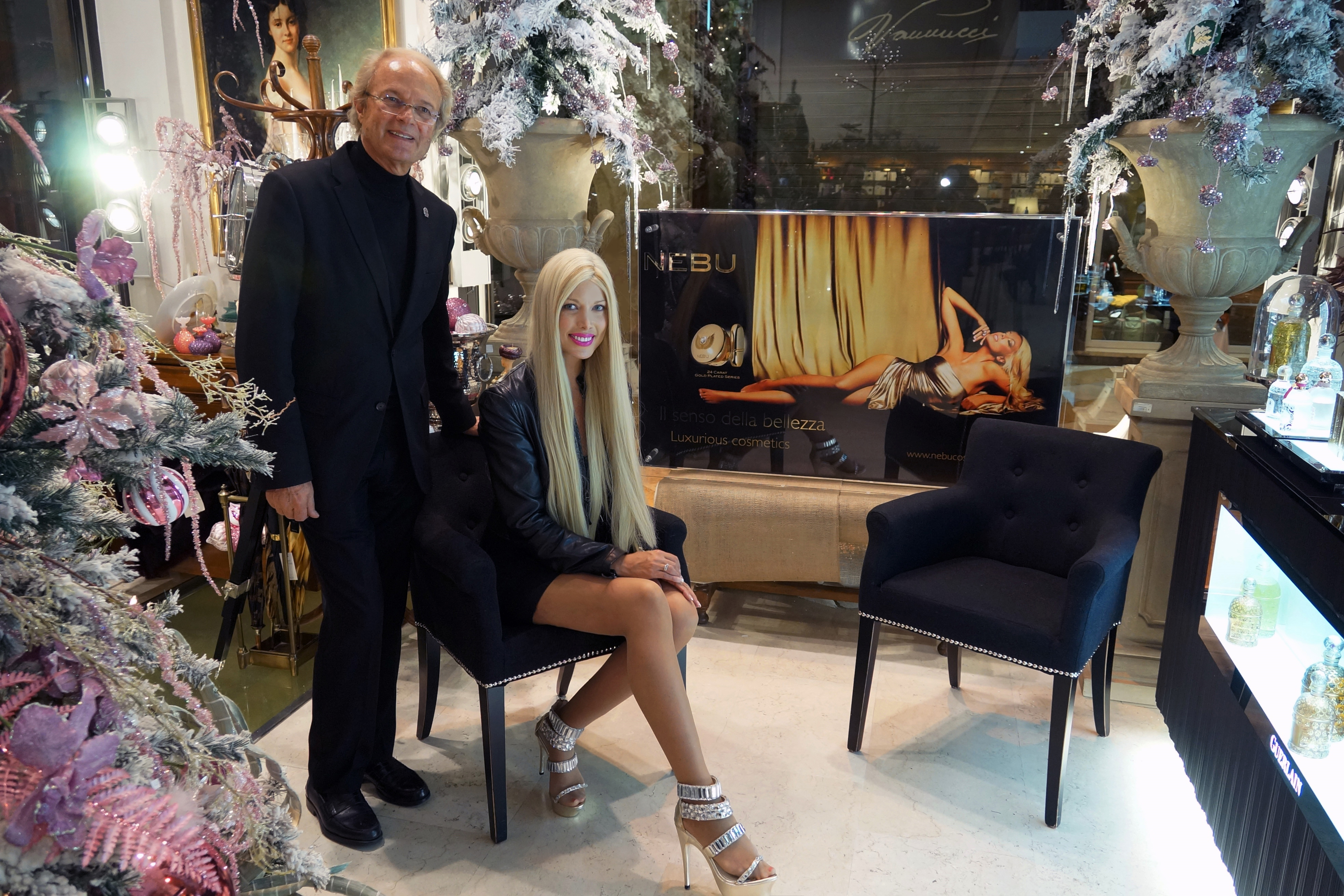
Gee and Mr. Mazzolari, at the brand opening of Nebu Milano

NEBU Milano

After moving part-time to Italy with her husband, in 2011 Gee and her husband co-founded and co-created Nebu Milano, an Italian cosmetic brand that sells 24 carat golden plated cosmetics with Swarovski Crystal elements. Gee is the spokeswoman, creative director and co-owner of the brand which was launched in Milan on November 21, 2013, in Mazzolari perfumeries. Gee and Nebu Milano have been featured in various Italian magazines, including Vogue Italia released during fashion week in Milan, Reve Italian Beauty Magazine, a 2014 edition of Italian magazine "Shopping For You" and fashion and beauty magazine "Milano World", where Gee was on the cover and reviewed as the perfect fit of beauty and talent in representing the brand, comparing her vocal capacity to Celine Dion. Gee and the brand have also been featured in Polish editions of Elle, InStyle, Gala and Twoj Styl, where the brand won Best New Brand of the year 2014 at the magazines' annual gala event. Gee was also on the cover of Shopping For You in 2011. In November 2014, Gee was showcased in various articles related to the brand in Milano World magazine. As of 2016, Nebu Milano is available in perfumeries around the world. Gee has combined the creativity and ownership of the brand with her music.

== Voice ==
Tamara is a soprano with a vocal range that spans over four octaves and is known for her powerful belt and strong vocal tambour.

== Personal life ==
Tamara Gee is living in Los Angeles and traveling to a variety of countries globally for concerts and appearances related to Nebu Milano.

== Discography ==
=== Studio albums ===
- 1993: No Time for Daydreams
- 2000: Blazin'
- 2002: Phantom Suite/The Music of Daniel Barry/Red Fish Blue Fish
- 2007: Hidden Treasure
- 2009: Christmas Angel
- 2014: Love, Tamara

=== Singles ===
Year	Title	Album
2007	"Hidden Treasure"	Hidden Treasure
2007	"What You See"	Hidden Treasure
2008	"For Life"	Hidden Treasure
2008	"Fate"	Sehnsucht
2008	"Christmas Angel"	Christmas Angel
2009	"Times of Change"	Inauguration of Barack Obama
2009	"Too Far From Here"	RubikOne
2009	"Sleep Away the Day"	Underwater Love
2010	"Live"	Live
2011	"How About That"	How About That
2011	"How About That"	CutFather Remix, Promid Remix
2014	"Your Alibi"	Love, Tamara
2015	"I will be strong"	Love, Tamara

Awards and achievements
Preceded by The Jet Set with "Time To Party"	Poland in the Eurovision Song Contest; 2008	Succeeded by Lidia Kopania with "I Don't Wanna Leave"
