= David Lyme =

- Also known as: Jordi Cubino
- Born: Jordi Cubino Bermejo; 22 November 1970 (age 55); Spain
- Genres: Italo disco, Sabadell sound
- Occupation: Singer
- Years active: 1985–present
- Labels: Max Music
- Website: http://www.jordicubino.com/

Jordi Cubino Bermejo (born 22 November 1970), known professionally as David Lyme or Jordi Cubino, is a Catalan singer, songwriter, and model. He was a part in the development of the Sabadell sound, a style of Italo disco.

== Career ==
He started out as an opera singer and later sang Italo disco covers.

In 1985 he released his first single, Let's Go to Sitges, under Max Music, which became a commercial success. Subsequently, two more singles were released in 1986, Bambina and Playboy, followed by the release of his debut album, Like a Star. The album contains eight songs, including two ballads and a new version of Bambina, as well as the commercially successful singles Bye Bye Mi Amor and I Don't Wanna Lose You.

In 1988 he released his second album, Lady, which included the singles Never Say You Love Me and the title track, Lady. His singles are part of the compilation series Max Mix and were also used in the follow-up series. Max Mix 2 includes the single Let's Go to Sitges, Max Mix 3 includes the single Bambina, Max Mix 4 includes the single Playboy, Max Mix 5 includes the singles Bye Bye Mi Amor and I Don't Wanna Lose You, and Max Mix 6 includes the single Never Say You Love Me.

In 1990 Lyme left Max Music and joined the label Blanco y Negro, which at the time was a competitor to Max Music. With his new label he released the single Perestroika, which became less of commercial success than his previous singles.

Lyme has also written and produced music for other artists (under various pseudonyms), and songs for TV commercials by companies such as Coca-Cola and Chupa Chups. A compilation of his singles was released by Sony Music in 2004.

== Discography ==
=== Albums ===
- Like a Star (1986)
- Lady (1988)

=== Singles ===
- Bambina (1985)
- Let's Go to Sitges (1985)
- Playboy (1986)
- I Don't Wanna Lose You (1986)
- Bye Bye Mi Amor (1987)
- Never Say You Love Me (1988)
- Lady (1988)
- Perestroika (1990)
