= Poland in the Eurovision Song Contest 2008 =

- Eurovision Song Contest 2008
- Participating broadcaster: Telewizja Polska (TVP)
- Country: Poland
- Selection process: Piosenka dla Europy 2008
- Selection date: 23 February 2008

Competing entry
- Song: "For Life"
- Artist: Isis Gee
- Songwriters: Isis Gee

Placement
- Semi-final result: Qualified (10th, 42 points)
- Final result: 24th, 14 points

Participation chronology

Poland was represented at the Eurovision Song Contest 2008 with the song "For Life", written and performed by Isis Gee. The Polish participating broadcaster, Telewizja Polska (TVP), organised the national final Piosenka dla Europy 2008 in order to select its entry for the contest. The national final took place on 23 February 2008 and featured twelve entries. "For Life" performed by Isis Gee was selected as the winner after gaining the most points following the combination of votes from a four-member jury panel and a public televote.

Poland was drawn to compete in the first semi-final of the Eurovision Song Contest which took place on 20 May 2008. Performing during the show in position 10, "For Life" was announced among the top 10 entries of the second semi-final and therefore qualified to compete in the final on 14 May. This marked the first time that Poland qualified to the final of the Eurovision Song Contest from a semi-final since the introduction of semi-finals in 2004. It was later revealed that Poland placed tenth out of the 19 participating countries in the semi-final with 42 points. In the final, Poland performed in position 10 and placed twenty-fourth out of the 25 participating countries, scoring 14 points.

== Background ==
Prior to the 2008 contest, Telewizja Polska (TVP) had participated in the Eurovision Song Contest representing Poland twelve times since its first entry in 1994. Its highest placement in the contest, to this point, has been second place, achieved with its debut entry in 1994 with the song "To nie ja!" performed by Edyta Górniak. It has only, thus far, reached the top ten on one other occasion, when "Keine Grenzen – Żadnych granic" performed by Ich Troje finished seventh in 2003. Between 2005 and 2006, it failed to qualify from the semi-final round, once again failing to qualify to the final in 2007 with their entry "Time to Party" performed by the Jet Set.

As part of its duties as participating broadcaster, TVP organises the selection of its entry in the Eurovision Song Contest and broadcasts the event in the country. The broadcaster confirmed its participation in the 2008 contest on 8 November 2007. Since 2006, TVP organised televised national finals that featured a competition among several artists and songs in order to select its entry, a selection procedure that continued for its 2008 entry.

== Before Eurovision ==
=== Piosenka dla Europy 2008 ===
Piosenka dla Europy 2008 (Song for Europe 2008) was the national final organised by TVP in order to select its entry for the Eurovision Song Contest 2008. The show took place on 23 February 2008 at the Studio 5 of TVP (17 Woronicza Street) in Warsaw, hosted by Katarzyna Sowińska and Radosław Brzózka. A combination of public televoting and jury voting selected the winner. The show was broadcast on TVP1 and TVP Polonia as well as streamed online at the broadcaster's website tvp.pl. The national final was watched by 2.7 million viewers in Poland with a market share of 26%.

==== Competing entries ====
TVP opened a submission period for interested artists and songwriters to submit their entries between 30 November 2007 and 2 January 2008. Only artists that had either released an album or single with national radio airplays, had competed in at least one professional song contest or music festival at a national level, or had a valid contract with a record company or a professional concert agency were eligible to compete. The broadcaster received 100 submissions at the closing of the deadline. A nine-member selection committee selected ten entries from the received submissions to compete in the national final, which were announced on 7 January 2008. The selection committee consisted of Piotr Klatt (musician, songwriter, journalist and music producer at TVP and artistic director of the Opole Festival), Paweł Sztompkę (journalist, music critic and editorial director of music at Polish Radio), Artur Orzech (Eurovision commentator, radio and television journalist and presenter), Magda Czapińska (songwriter), Zuzanna Łapicka (Head of Entertainment of TVP1), Agata Krysiak (editor at the Polish Society of the Phonographic Industry), Ryszard Poznakowski (singer and composer), Robert Obcowski (composer and producer) and Tomasz Deszczyński (President of OGAE Poland). TVP selected an additional three entries to compete as wildcards, which were announced on 8 February 2008. Among the competing artists was Sandra Oxenryd, who represented Estonia in 2006.

On 11 January 2008, "Kiełbasa", written and to have been performed by Krzysztof Zalewski, was disqualified from the national final as the song had been released before 1 October 2007 and replaced with the song "Do Something" performed by Plastic. On 15 February, wildcard entry "Noc kupaly", written by Robert Wasilewski and to have been performed by Zywiolak, was disqualified from the national final as the song had been performed before 1 October 2007. The competing artists were required to submit a promotional video for their song to TVP by 28 January 2008.

Artist	Song	Songwriter(s)	Selection
Afromental	"Thing We've Got"	Wojciech Lozowski, Bartosz Śniadecki	Open submission
Edi Ann	"Lovin' U"	Edyta Kuczynska	Open submission
Isis Gee	"For Life"	Isis Gee	Open submission
Izabela Kopeć	"You've Got My Love"	Filip Kuncevicz, Izabela Kopeć	TVP wildcard
Kasia Nova	"The Devil"	Harald Retinger, Ulrich Fischer	Open submission
Man Meadow	"Viva la Musica"	Thomas G:son, Andreas Rickstrand	Open submission
Margo	"Dlatego walcz"	Filip Siejka, Malgorzata Gadzinska	Open submission
Natasza Urbańska	"Blow Over"	Rickey Fernand	TVP wildcard
Plastic	"Do Something"	Agnieszka Burcan	Open submission
Queens	"I Say My Body"	Lukasz Pilch, Marcin Skoczylas	Open submission
Sandra Oxenryd	"Superhero"	Knut-Oyvind Hagen, Andreas Rickstrand	Open submission
Starnawski and Urban Noiz	"It's Not a Game"	Marcin Urban, Bozena Intrator	Open submission

==== Final ====
The televised final took place on 23 February 2008. Twelve entries competed and the winner, "For Life" performed by Isis Gee, was determined by a 50/50 combination of votes from a four-member professional jury and a public televote. The jury consisted of Maryla Rodowicz (singer), Janusz Kosiński (journalist), Paweł Sztompke (journalist, music critic and editorial director of music at Polish Radio) and Adrian Stanisławski (member of OGAE Poland). The performance order of the candidate entries took place at the headquarters of Telewizja Polska on 29 January, where contestants or their representatives participated in the event. In addition to the performances of the competing entries, singer Natalia Kukulska opened the show with her song "Sexy Flexi", while Kukulska and singers Bartosz Królik, In-Grid and Stachursky performed as the interval acts.

On 23 February, the members of the jury were announced. The jury consisted of:

- Maryla Rodowicz (chairperson)
- Janusz Kosiński (music journalist, Polskie Radio)
- Paweł Sztompke (music journalist, Polskie Radio)
- Adrian Stanisławski (representative of OGAE Poland, Eurovision fans association)

During the selection, the winner was determined by a 50% split between the jury and the televote, with voting carried out via the audio-tele system. A total of 57,462 valid votes were cast. For the first time in the history of the Polish Eurovision selections, both the jury and the viewers awarded the winner the highest score of twelve points.

Final – 23 February 2008
R/O	Artist	Song	Jury	Televote	Total	Place
1	Kasia Nova	"The Devil"	0	1	1	11
2	Edi Ann	"Lovin' U"	7	5	12	4
3	Izabela Kopeć	"You've Got My Love"	4	6	10	6
4	Starnawski and Urban Noiz	"It's Not a Game"	5	0	5	10
5	Queens	"I Say My Body"	0	0	0	12
6	Isis Gee	"For Life"	12	12	24	1
7	Man Meadow	"Viva la Musica"	2	10	12	3
8	Afromental	"Thing We've Got"	3	4	7	9
9	Plastic	"Do Something"	10	2	12	5
10	Sandra Oxenryd	"Superhero"	6	3	9	8
11	Natasza Urbańska	"Blow Over"	8	7	15	2
12	Margo	"Dlatego walcz"	1	8	9	7

==== OGAE Poland favorite ====
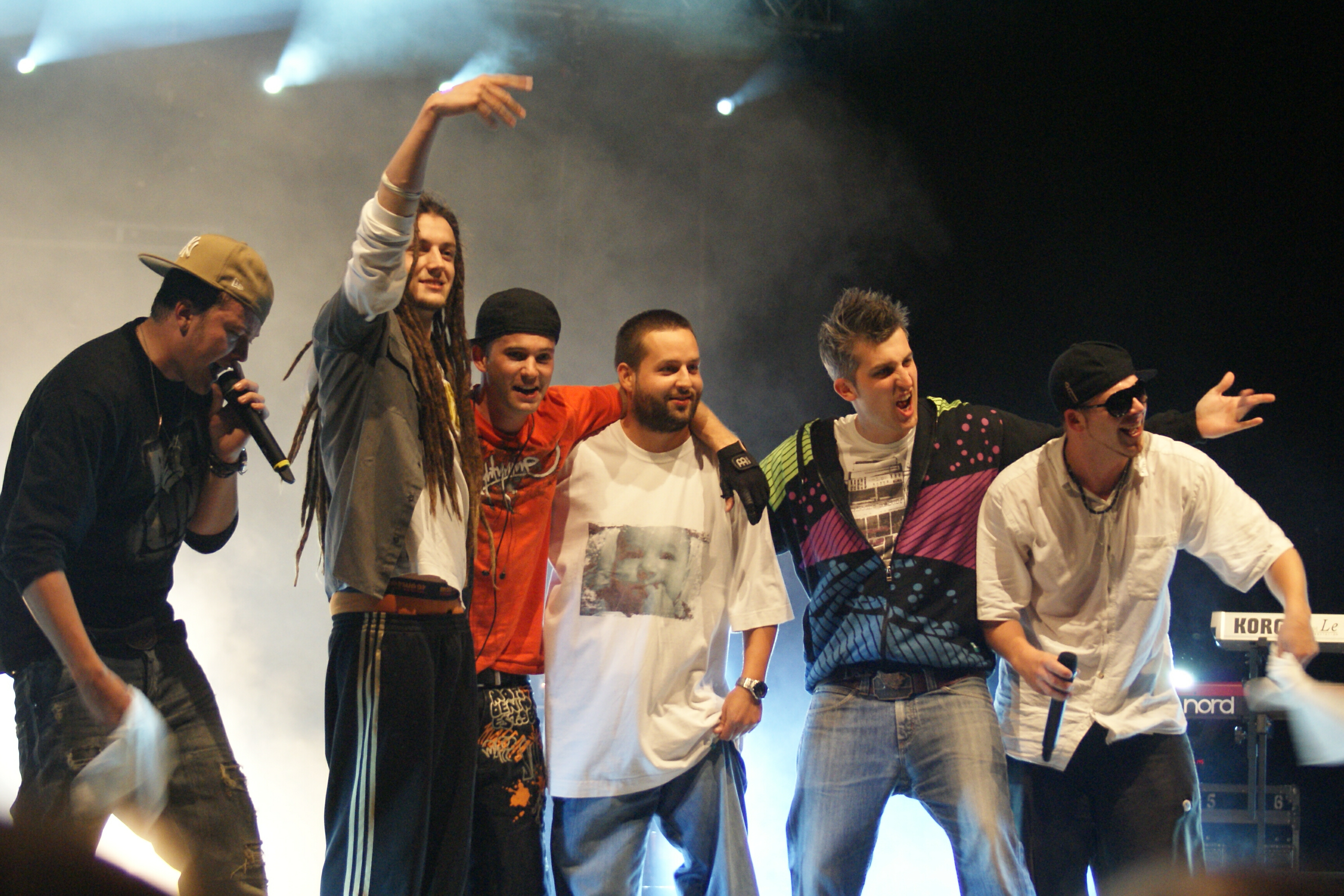
Afromental – 9th place in both the OGAE Poland ranking and the final of the selection

Members of OGAE Poland selected their favorites shortly before the Piosenka dla Europy 2008 concert. The poll was coordinated by the Entertainment Department – Tomasz Lener and Artur Onacki. Below is the overall ranking of OGAE Poland members, covering all the finalists of the selection:

1. Isis Gee – For Life
2. Izabela Kopeć – You've Got My Life
3. Sandra Oxenryd – Superhero
4. Margo – Dlatego walcz
5. Plastic – Do Something
6. Man Meadow – Viva La Musica
7. Kasia Nova – The Devil
8. Starnawski & Urban Noiz – It's Not a Game
9. Afromental – Thing We've Got
10. Edi Ann – Lovin' U
11. Natasza Urbańska – Blow Over
12. Queens – I Say My Body

==== Viewership ====
The Piosenka dla Europy 2008 selection was watched by an average of 2.7 million viewers:

- Piosenka dla Europy, Part 1 – 2.97 million (21.88% share)
- Piosenka dla Europy, Part 2 – 2.33 million (18.60% share)
- Piosenka dla Europy, Part 3 (announcement of results) – 2.87 million (25.92% share)

=== Promotion ===
Isis Gee made several appearances across Europe to specifically promote "For Life" as the Polish Eurovision entry. On 2 March, Isis Gee performed during the presentation show of the 2008 Bosnian Eurovision entry, BH Eurosong 2008. On 25 April, Gee performed during the UK Eurovision Eurovision Party, which was held at the Scala Club in London, United Kingdom. Isis Gee completed promotional activities in Ireland where she performed during the RTÉ One talk show The Late Late Show on 6 May.

== At Eurovision ==
It was announced in September 2007 that the competition's format would be expanded to two semi-finals in 2008. According to the rules, all nations with the exceptions of the host country and the "Big Four" (France, Germany, Spain, and the United Kingdom) are required to qualify from one of two semi-finals in order to compete for the final; the top nine songs from each semi-final as determined by televoting progress to the final, and a tenth was determined by back-up juries. The European Broadcasting Union (EBU) split up the competing countries into six different pots based on voting patterns from previous contests, with countries with favourable voting histories put into the same pot. On 28 January 2008, an allocation draw was held which placed each country into one of the two semi-finals. Poland was placed into the first semi-final, to be held on 20 May 2008. The running order for the semi-finals was decided through another draw on 17 March 2008 and Poland was set to perform in position 10, following the entry from Norway and before the entry from Ireland.

The two semi-finals and the final were broadcast in Poland on TVP1 and TVP Polonia with commentary by Artur Orzech. TVP appointed Radek Brzózka as its spokesperson to announce the Polish votes during the final.

=== Semi-final ===
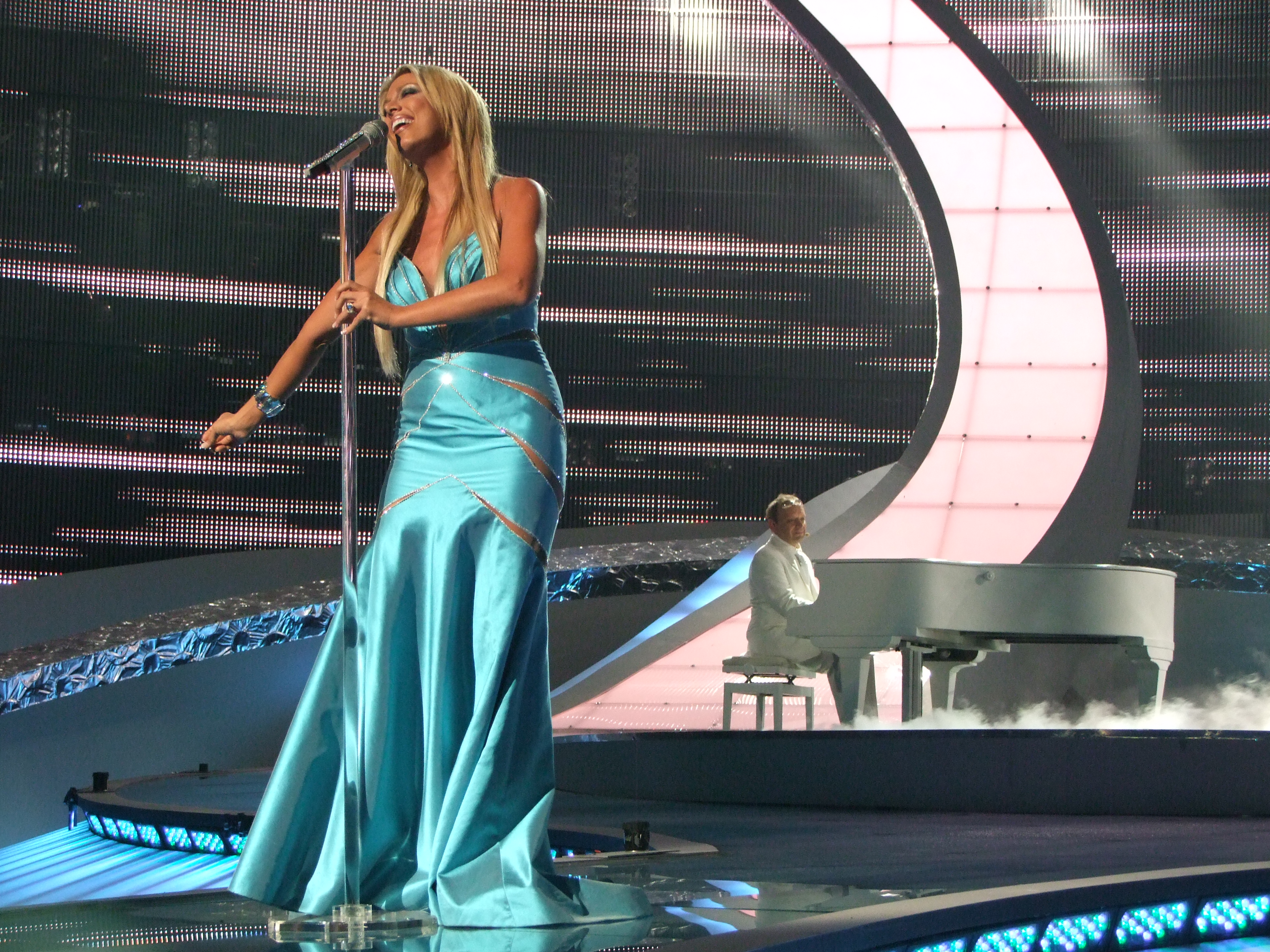
Isis Gee during a rehearsal before the first semi-final

Isis Gee took part in technical rehearsals on 12 and 15 May, followed by dress rehearsals on 19 and 20 May. The Polish performance featured Isis Gee performing in a long light blue dress flanked by a pianist on one side of the stage and four violinists on the other. The stage LED screens displayed white and light blue colours with the performance also featuring smoke effects. The musicians that joined Gee on stage were: Adam Gołębiowski (pianist), Beata Lapuk (violinist), Jona Ardyn (violinist), Małgorzata Liberska (violinist) and Patrycja Kawecka (violinist).

At the end of the show, Poland was announced as having finished among the ten qualifying countries and subsequently qualifying for the grand final. This marked the first time that Poland qualified to the final of the Eurovision Song Contest from a semi-final since the introduction of semi-finals in 2004. It was later revealed that Poland placed tenth in the semi-final, receiving a total of 42 points.

=== Final ===
The draw for the running order for the final was done by the presenters during the announcement of the ten qualifying countries during the semi-final and Poland was drawn to perform in position 10, following the entry from Croatia and before the entry from Iceland. Isis Gee once again took part in dress rehearsals on 23 and 24 May before the final and Gee performed a repeat of her semi-final performance during the final on 24 May. Poland placed twenty-fourth in the final, scoring 14 points.

=== Voting ===
Below is a breakdown of points awarded to Poland and awarded by Poland in the first semi-final and grand final of the contest. The nation awarded its 12 points to Armenia in the semi-final and the final of the contest.

==== Points awarded to Poland ====
Points awarded to Poland (Semi-final 1)
Score	Country
12 points	Ireland
10 points	San Marino
8 points	
7 points	
6 points	
5 points	Germany
4 points	
3 points	Azerbaijan; Russia; Spain
2 points	Norway; Romania
1 point	Armenia; Greece

Points awarded to Poland (Final)
Score	Country
12 points	
10 points	Ireland
8 points	
7 points	
6 points	
5 points	
4 points	United Kingdom
3 points	
2 points	
1 point	

==== Points awarded by Poland ====
Points awarded by Poland (Semi-final 1)
Score	Country
12 points	Armenia
10 points	Azerbaijan
8 points	Russia
7 points	Norway
6 points	Greece
5 points	Finland
4 points	Israel
3 points	Romania
2 points	Slovenia
1 point	Andorra

Points awarded by Poland (Final)
Score	Country
12 points	Armenia
10 points	Ukraine
8 points	Norway
7 points	Azerbaijan
6 points	Russia
5 points	Israel
4 points	Serbia
3 points	Greece
2 points	Finland
1 point	France
