= Norway in the Eurovision Song Contest 2010 =

- Eurovision Song Contest 2010
- Participating broadcaster: Norsk rikskringkasting (NRK)
- Country: Norway
- Selection process: Melodi Grand Prix 2010
- Selection date: 6 February 2010

Competing entry
- Song: "My Heart Is Yours"
- Artist: Didrik Solli-Tangen
- Songwriters: Hanne Sørvaag; Fredrik Kempe

Placement
- Final result: 20th, 35 points

Participation chronology

Norway was represented at the Eurovision Song Contest 2010 with the song "My Heart Is Yours" written by Hanne Sørvaag and Fredrik Kempe, and performed by Didrik Solli-Tangen. The Norwegian participating broadcaster, Norsk rikskringkasting (NRK), selected its entry through the Melodi Grand Prix 2010. In addition, NRK was also the host broadcaster and staged the event at the Telenor Arena in Oslo, after winning the previous edition with the song "Fairytale" performed by Alexander Rybak.

Twenty-one entries competed in the national final that consisted of three semi-finals, a Last Chance round and a final. Eight entries ultimately qualified to compete in the final on 6 February 2010 where the winner was determined over two rounds of voting. In the first round of voting, a public televote exclusively selected the top four entries to advance to the competition's second round—the Gold Final. In the second round of voting, "My Heart Is Yours" performed by Didrik Solli-Tangen was selected as the winner following the combination of votes from four regional jury groups and a public televote.

As the host country, Norway qualified to compete directly in the final of the Eurovision Song Contest. Performing in position 3 during the final, Norway placed twentieth out of the 25 participating countries with 35 points.

== Background ==
Prior to the 2010 contest, Norsk rikskringkasting (NRK) had participated in the Eurovision Song Contest representing Norway 48 times since its first entry in 1960. It had won the contest on three occasions: in 1985 with the song "La det swinge" performed by Bobbysocks!, in 1995 with the song "Nocturne" performed by Secret Garden, and in 2009 with the song "Fairytale" performed by Alexander Rybak. Norway also had the two dubious distinctions of having finished last in the Eurovision final more than any other country and for having the most "nul points" (zero points) in the contest, the latter being a record the nation shared together with Austria. It had finished last 10 times and had failed to score a point during four contests. Following the introduction of semi-finals in 2004, it has, to this point, finished in the top 10 three times: Wig Wam finished ninth with the song "In My Dreams" in 2005, Maria Haukaas Storeng was fifth in 2008 with "Hold On Be Strong", and Alexander Rybak won in 2009.

As part of its duties as participating broadcaster, NRK organises the selection of its entry in the Eurovision Song Contest and broadcasts the event in the country. NRK has traditionally organised the national final Melodi Grand Prix, which has selected its entry for the contest in all but one of its participation. On 6 July 2009, the broadcaster revealed details regarding its selection procedure and announced the organization of Melodi Grand Prix 2010 in order to select its 2010 entry.

== Before Eurovision ==
=== Melodi Grand Prix 2010 ===
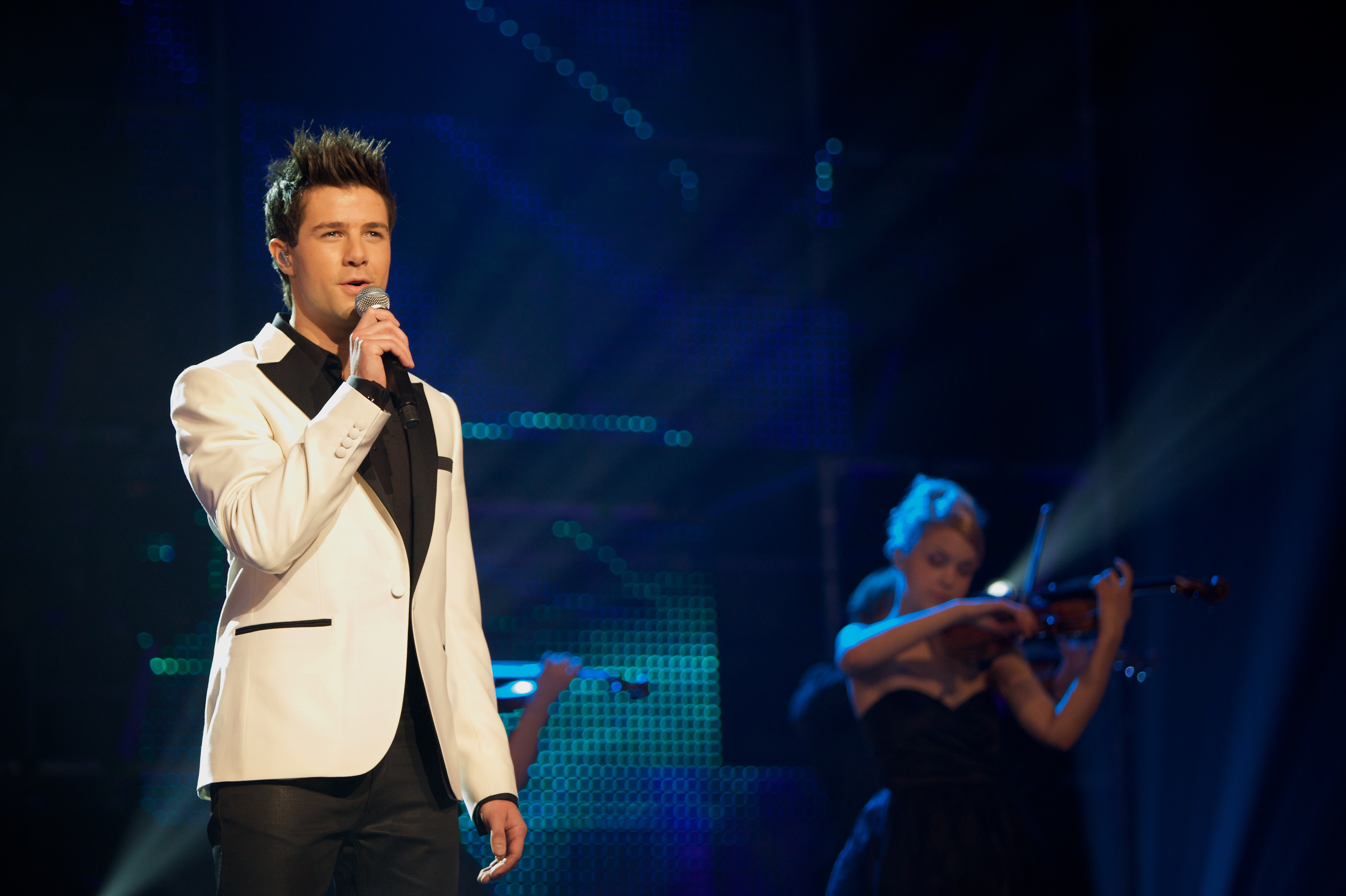
Winner Didrik Solli-Tangen performing "My Heart is Yours" at the third semi-final of Melodi Grand Prix 2010

Melodi Grand Prix 2010 was the 48th edition of the Norwegian national final Melodi Grand Prix and selected their entry for the Eurovision Song Contest 2010. 21 songs were selected to compete in a five-week-long process that commenced on 8 January 2010 and concluded with the final on 6 February 2010. All shows were hosted by Per Sundnes and Marte Stokstad and televised on NRK1 as well as streamed online at NRK's official website nrk.no.

==== Format ====
The competition consisted of five shows: three semi-finals on 8, 16 and 23 January 2010, a Last Chance round (Sistesjansen) on 30 January 2010 and a final on 6 February 2010. Seven songs competed in each semi-final and the top two entries directly qualified to the final, while the entries that placed third and fourth proceeded to the Last Chance round. Two wildcards were also awarded to the two acts that received the most votes out of the bottom three songs in the semi-finals to proceed to the Last Chance round. An additional two entries qualified to the final from the Last Chance round. The results of the semi-finals and Last Chance round were determined exclusively by public televoting, while the results in the final were determined by jury voting and public televoting. Viewers could cast their votes through telephone and SMS voting.

==== Competing entries ====
A submission period was opened by NRK between 6 July 2009 and 1 September 2009. Songwriters were required to hold Norwegian citizenship or have permanent residency in Norway in order to be eligible to compete. Collaborations with foreign songwriters were permitted, however their percentage of contribution must not exceed 50%. Performers of the selected songs would be chosen by NRK in consultation with the songwriters, and the broadcaster reserved the right to directly invite certain artists and composers to compete in addition to the public call for submissions. At the close of the deadline, a record-breaking 1,000 submissions were received. 21 songs were selected for the competition by a jury panel headed by Melodi Grand Prix project manager Per Sundnes, and their titles were revealed on 27 November 2009. The seven acts competing in each semi-final were revealed on 4, 11 and 17 December 2009, respectively, and among the artists was past Norwegian Eurovision entrant Maria Haukaas Storeng who represented the country in 2008.

Artist	Song	Songwriter(s)
A1	"Don't Wanna Lose You Again"	Ben Adams, Mark Read, Christian Ingebrigtsen, David Eriksen
Alexander Stenerud	"Give It to Me"	Alexander Stenerud
Belinda Braza	"Million Dollar Baby"	Robin Nordahl, Frode Andersen, Gerard James Borg
Bjørn Johan Muri	"Yes Man"	Simone Larsen, Simen Eriksrud, Bjørn Johan Muri
Didrik Solli-Tangen	"My Heart Is Yours"	Hanne Sørvaag, Fredrik Kempe
Elisabeth Carew	"Rocketfuel"	Elisabeth Carew, Thomas Eriksen
Fred Endresen	"Barracks on the Hill"	Fred Endresen, Olaf Øwre
Gaute Ormåsen	"Synk eller svøm"	Gaute Ormåsen, Laila Samuelsen, Kim Bergseth
Hanne Haugsand	"Don't Stop"	Mariann Thomassen, Lars Erik Westby
Heine Totland	"The Best of Me Is You"	Heine Totland, Hans Petter Aaserud, Arne Hovda
Johnny Hide	"Rewind Love"	Julian Berntzen
Karoline Garfjell Rundberg	"Tokyo Night"	Aggie Frost Peterson
Keep of Kalessin	"The Dragontower"	Arnt "Obsidian" Grønbech, Torbjørn Schei, Vegar Larsen, Robin Isaksen
Lene Alexandra	"Prima Donna"	Jarl Aanestad, Simon Walker, Lene Alexandra
Maria Arredondo	"The Touch"	Rolf Løvland
Maria Haukaas Storeng	"Make My Day"	Merethe La Verdi, Mats Lie Skåre
Mira Craig	"I'll Take You High"	Mira Craig
Skanksters	"Life Is Here Today"	Arne Hovda
The Diamond	"European Girl"	Matias Tellez, Håkon Njøten, Axel Vindenes
Tomine Harket	"Be Good to Me"	Tommy La Verdi, Peter Ställmark
Venke Knutson	"Jealous 'Cause I Love You"	Laila Samuelsen, Alexander Kronlund, Lukas Hilbert

==== Semi-finals ====
Seven songs competed in each of the three semi-finals that took place on 8, 16 and 23 January 2010. The first semi-final took place at the Hangar E of the Ørland Hovedflystasjon in Ørland, the second semi-final took place at the Bodø Spektrum in Bodø, and the third semi-final took place at the Skien Fritidspark in Skien. In each semi-final the top two directly qualified to the final, while the third and fourth placed songs proceeded to the Last Chance round. The two acts with the most votes out of the bottom three songs in the semi-finals also proceeded to the Last Chance round as wildcards and were announced on 25 January 2010: "Rewind Love" performed by Johnny Hide and "Life Is Here Today" performed by Skanksters.

Semi-final 1 – 8 January 2010
R/O	Artist	Song	Result
1	Gaute Ormåsen	"Synk eller svøm"	Last Chance
2	Lene Alexandra	"Prima Donna"	—N/a
3	Johnny Hide	"Rewind Love"	Last Chance
4	Bjørn Johan Muri	"Yes Man"	Last Chance
5	Elisabeth Carew	"Rocketfuel"	—N/a
6	Maria Haukaas Storeng	"Make My Day"	Final
7	Keep of Kalessin	"The Dragontower"	Final

Semi-final 2 – 16 January 2010
R/O	Artist	Song	Result
1	Venke Knutson	"Jealous 'Cause I Love You"	Last Chance
2	Skanksters	"Life Is Here Today"	Last Chance
3	Tomine Harket	"Be Good to Me"	—N/a
4	Hanne Haugsand	"Don't Stop"	—N/a
5	Maria Arredondo	"The Touch"	Final
6	Heine Totland	"The Best of Me Is You"	Last Chance
7	Alexander Stenerud	"Give It to Me"	Final

Semi-final 3 – 23 January 2010
R/O	Artist	Song	Result
1	Mira Craig	"I'll Take You High"	Last Chance
2	Fred Endresen	"Barracks on the Hill"	—N/a
3	Belinda Braza	"Million Dollar Baby"	—N/a
4	Didrik Solli-Tangen	"My Heart Is Yours"	Final
5	The Diamond	"European Girl"	—N/a
6	Karoline Garfjell Rundberg	"Tokyo Night"	Last Chance
7	A1	"Don't Wanna Lose You Again"	Final

==== Last Chance round ====
The Last Chance round took place on 30 January 2010 at the Sparta Amfi in Sarpsborg. The six entries that placed third and fourth in the preceding three semi-finals as well as the two wildcards competed and the two entries that qualified to the final were selected over two rounds of voting. In the first round, the eight entries competed in four duels and the winners of each duel proceeded to the second round. In the second round, the remaining four entries competed in two duels and the winners of each duel qualified to the final.

First Round – 30 January 2010
Duel	R/O	Artist	Song	Result
I	1	Skanksters	"Life Is Here Today"	—N/a
I	2	Bjørn Johan Muri	"Yes Man"	Second Round
II	3	Gaute Ormåsen	"Synk eller svøm"	Second Round
II	4	Heine Totland	"The Best of Me Is You"	—N/a
III	5	Johnny Hide	"Rewind Love"	—N/a
III	6	Mira Craig	"I'll Take You High"	Second Round
IV	7	Karoline Garfjell Rundberg	"Tokyo Night"	—N/a
IV	8	Venke Knutson	"Jealous 'Cause I Love You"	Second Round

Second Round – 30 January 2010
Duel	R/O	Artist	Song	Result
I	1	Bjørn Johan Muri	"Yes Man"	Final
I	2	Gaute Ormåsen	"Synk eller svøm"	—N/a
II	3	Mira Craig	"I'll Take You High"	—N/a
II	4	Venke Knutson	"Jealous 'Cause I Love You"	Final

==== Final ====
Eight songs that qualified from the preceding three semi-finals and the Last Chance round competed during the final at the Oslo Spektrum in Oslo on 6 February 2010. The winner was selected over two rounds of voting. In the first round, the top four entries were selected by public televoting to proceed to the second round, the Gold Final. In the Gold Final, four regional juries from the three semi-final and Last Chance round host cities each distributed points as follows: 2,000, 4,000, 6,000 and 8,000 points. The results of the public televote were then revealed by Norway's five regions and added to the jury scores, leading to the victory of "My Heart Is Yours" performed by Didrik Solli-Tangen with 466,675 votes. In addition to the performances of the competing entries, the show was opened with Norwegian Eurovision 2009 winner Alexander Rybak performing his entry "Fairytale", while the interval act featured a Melodi Grand Prix medley performed by Ingrid Bjørnov.

Final – 6 February 2010
R/O	Artist	Song	Result
1	A1	"Don't Wanna Lose You Again"	Gold Final
2	Maria Haukaas Storeng	"Make My Day"	—N/a
3	Venke Knutson	"Jealous 'Cause I Love You"	—N/a
4	Bjørn Johan Muri	"Yes Man"	Gold Final
5	Maria Arredondo	"The Touch"	—N/a
6	Alexander Stenerud	"Give It to Me"	—N/a
7	Didrik Solli-Tangen	"My Heart Is Yours"	Gold Final
8	Keep of Kalessin	"The Dragontower"	Gold Final

Gold Final – 6 February 2010
R/O	Artist	Song	Jury	Televote	Total	Place
1	Bjørn Johan Muri	"Yes Man"	16,000	153,174	169,174	4
2	Didrik Solli-Tangen	"My Heart Is Yours"	26,000	440,675	466,675	1
3	Keep of Kalessin	"The Dragontower"	24,000	217,164	241,164	3
4	A1	"Don't Wanna Lose You Again"	14,000	264,882	278,882	2

Detailed Regional Jury Votes
R/O	Song	Ørland	Bodø	Skien	Sarpsborg	Total
1	"Yes Man"	6,000	4,000	4,000	2,000	16,000
2	"My Heart Is Yours"	4,000	8,000	8,000	6,000	26,000
3	"The Dragontower"	8,000	6,000	2,000	8,000	24,000
4	"Don't Wanna Lose You Again"	2,000	2,000	6,000	4,000	14,000
Spokespersons
Ørland – Hallgeir Grøntvedt; Bodø – Odd Tore Fygle; Skien – Rolf Erling Andersen; Sarpsborg – Jan O. Engsmyr

Detailed Regional Televoting Results
R/O	Song	North	West	Central	South	East	Total
1	"Yes Man"	3,139	10,871	32,488	30,840	75,836	153,174
2	"My Heart Is Yours"	10,027	31,567	67,056	113,998	218,027	440,675
3	"The Dragontower"	4,855	15,492	41,257	46,457	109,103	217,164
4	"Don't Wanna Lose You Again"	6,949	20,576	45,937	57,059	134,361	264,882
Spokespersons
Northern Norway – Jørn Hoel; Western Norway – Christine Guldbrandsen; Central Norway – Merethe Trøan; Southern Norway – Lars Fredriksen; Eastern Norway – Benedicte Adrian

==== Ratings ====
Viewing figures by show
Show	Date	Viewers (in millions)	Ref.
Semi-final 1	8 January 2010	0.985	
Semi-final 2	16 January 2010	1.154	
Semi-final 3	23 January 2010	0.958	
Last Chance (Part 1)	30 January 2010	0.96	
Last Chance (Part 2)	30 January 2010	1.056	
Final	6 February 2010	1.382	

== At Eurovision ==
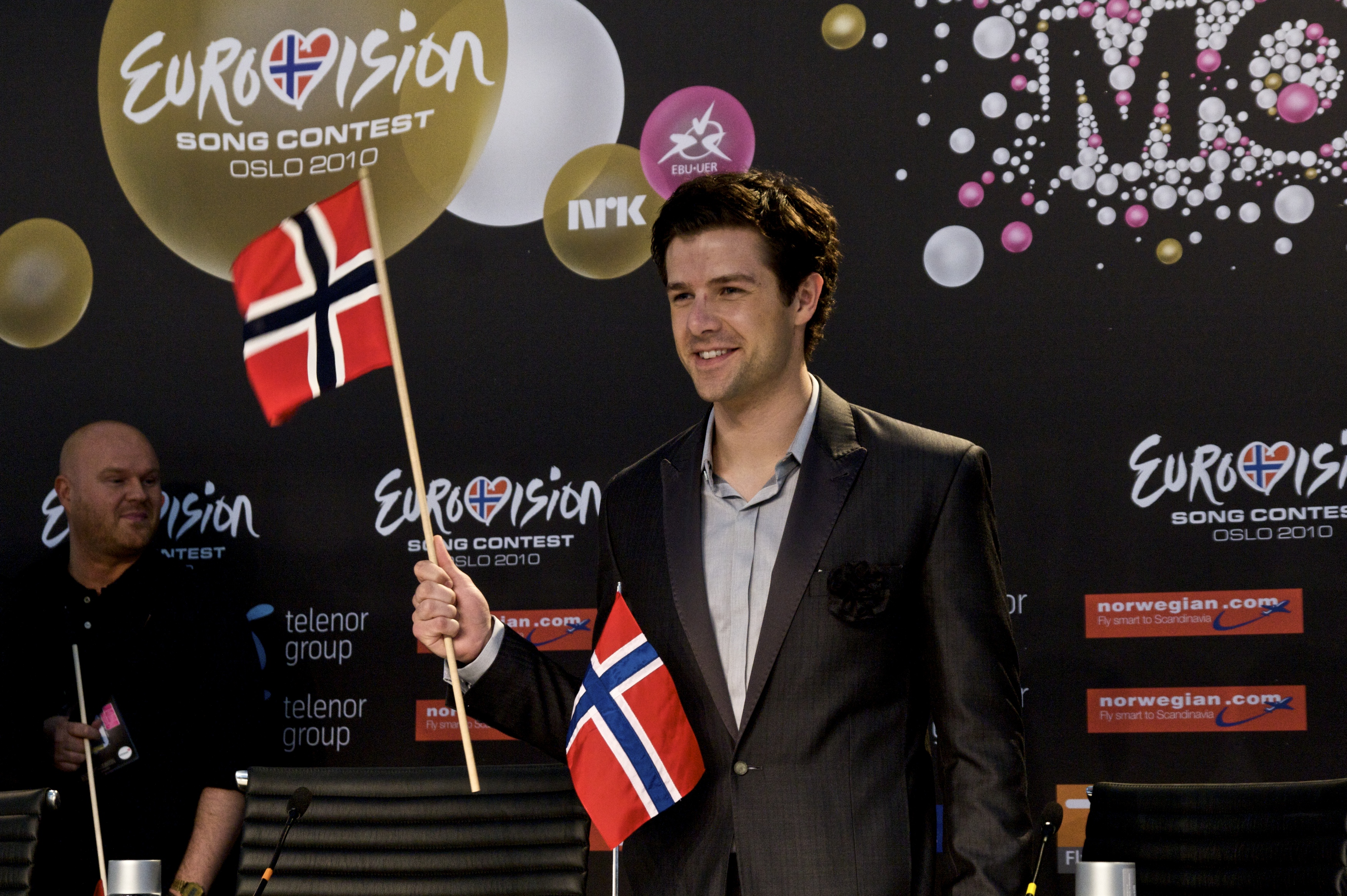
Didrik Solli-Tangen during a press meet and greet

According to Eurovision rules, all nations with the exceptions of the host country and the "Big Four" (France, Germany, Spain and the United Kingdom) were required to qualify from one of two semi-finals in order to compete for the final; the top ten countries from each semi-final progress to the final. As the host country, Norway automatically qualified to compete in the final on 29 May 2010. In addition to their participation in the final, Norway is also required to broadcast and vote in one of the two semi-finals. During the semi-final allocation draw on 7 February 2010, Norway was assigned to broadcast and vote in the second semi-final on 27 May 2010.

In Norway, the two semi-finals and the final were broadcast on NRK1 with commentary by Olav Viksmo-Slettan. NRK appointed Anne Rimmen as it spokesperson to announce the Norwegian votes during the final.

=== Final ===
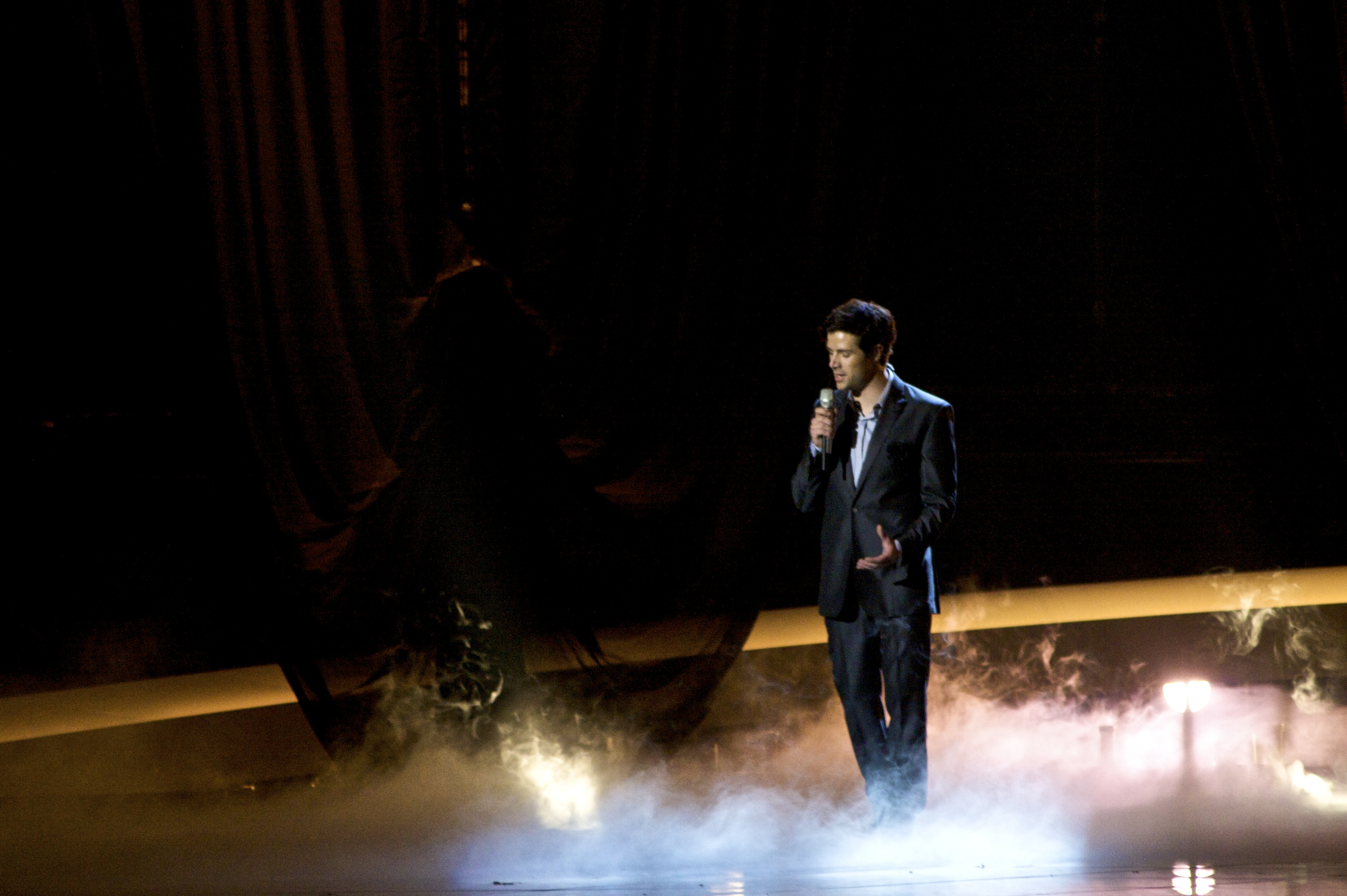
Didrik Solli-Tangen during a rehearsal before the final

Didrik Solli-Tangen took part in technical rehearsals on 22 and 23 May, followed by dress rehearsals on 28 and 29 May. This included the jury final on 28 May where the professional juries of each country watched and voted on the competing entries. As the host nation, Norway's running order position in the final was decided through another draw on 23 March 2010. Norway was drawn to perform in position 3. While their position had already been drawn, it was determined following the second semi-final winners' press conference that Norway would perform following Spain and before Moldova.

The Norwegian performance featured Didrik Solli-Tangen performing on stage together with five backing vocalists. The performance began with Solli-Tangen alone on stage in a single spotlight; the backing vocalists later appeared on his left and ultimately outside of the frame to a spread-out position behind. The stage also featured a large half-circle of curtains that began to whirl when the backing vocalists moved behind Solli-Tangen. At the end of the song, pyrotechnic effects were used alongside moving cascades of silver spray. The five backing vocalists on stage with Didrik Solli-Tangen were: Håkon Sigernes, Jorunn Hauge, Karianne Kjærnes, May Kristin Kaspersen and Øyvind Boye. Norway placed twentieth in the final, scoring 35 points. The final was watched by 1.989 million viewers in Norway with a market share of 89%.

=== Voting ===
Voting during the three shows consisted of 50 percent public televoting and 50 percent from a jury deliberation. The jury consisted of five music industry professionals who were citizens of the country they represent. This jury was asked to judge each contestant based on: vocal capacity; the stage performance; the song's composition and originality; and the overall impression by the act. In addition, no member of a national jury could be related in any way to any of the competing acts in such a way that they cannot vote impartially and independently. The following members comprised the Norwegian jury: Elisabet Davidsen, Vivi Stenberg, Arne Martin Vistnes, Svein Helge Høgberg and Anne-Karine Strøm.

Following the release of the full split voting by the EBU after the conclusion of the competition, it was revealed that Norway had placed twenty-first with the public televote and seventeenth with the jury vote. In the public vote, Norway scored 18 points and in the jury vote the nation scored 61 points.

Below is a breakdown of points awarded to Norway and awarded by Norway in the second semi-final and grand final of the contest. The nation awarded its 12 points to Sweden in the semi-final and to Germany in the final of the contest.

==== Points awarded to Norway ====
Points awarded to Norway (Final)
Score	Country
12 points	
10 points	
8 points	
7 points	Estonia
6 points	Georgia
5 points	Denmark
4 points	Sweden
3 points	Malta; Portugal; Slovakia
2 points	Armenia; Ireland
1 point	

==== Points awarded by Norway ====
Points awarded by Norway (Semi-final 2)
Score	Country
12 points	Sweden
10 points	Romania
8 points	Denmark
7 points	Israel
6 points	Ireland
5 points	Lithuania
4 points	Ukraine
3 points	Netherlands
2 points	Azerbaijan
1 point	Turkey

Points awarded by Norway (Final)
Score	Country
12 points	Germany
10 points	Romania
8 points	Denmark
7 points	Azerbaijan
6 points	Iceland
5 points	Israel
4 points	France
3 points	Belgium
2 points	Turkey
1 point	Georgia
