= Norway in the Eurovision Song Contest 2009 =

- Eurovision Song Contest 2009
- Participating broadcaster: Norsk rikskringkasting (NRK)
- Country: Norway
- Selection process: Melodi Grand Prix 2009
- Selection date: 21 February 2009

Competing entry
- Song: "Fairytale"
- Artist: Alexander Rybak
- Songwriters: Alexander Rybak

Placement
- Semi-final result: Qualified (1st, 201 points)
- Final result: 1st, 387 points

Participation chronology

Norway was represented at the Eurovision Song Contest 2009 with the song "Fairytale", written and performed by Alexander Rybak. The Norwegian participating broadcaster, Norsk rikskringkasting (NRK), organised the national final Melodi Grand Prix 2009 in order to select its entry for the contest. 21 entries competed in the national final that consisted of three semi-finals, a Last Chance round and a final. Eight entries ultimately qualified to compete in the final on 21 February 2009 where the winner was determined over two rounds of voting. In the first round of voting, a public televote exclusively selected the top four entries to advance to the competition's second round—the Gold Final. In the second round of voting, "Fairytale" performed by Alexander Rybak was selected as the winner following the combination of votes from four regional jury groups and a public televote.

Norway was drawn to compete in the second semi-final of the Eurovision Song Contest which took place on 14 May 2009. Performing during the show in position 6, "Fairytale" was announced among the 10 qualifying entries of the second semi-final and therefore qualified to compete in the final on 16 May. It was later revealed that Norway placed first out of the 19 participating countries in the semi-final with 201 points. In the final, Norway performed in position 20 and placed first out of the 25 participating countries, winning the contest with 387 points. This was Norway's third win in the Eurovision Song Contest and the first since 1995.

== Background ==
Prior to the 2009 contest, Norsk rikskringkasting (NRK) had participated in the Eurovision Song Contest representing Norway 47 times since its first entry in 1960. It had won the contest on two occasions: in 1985 with the song "La det swinge" performed by Bobbysocks!, and in 1995 with the song "Nocturne" performed by Secret Garden. It also had the two dubious distinctions of having finished last in the Eurovision final more than any other country and for having the most "nul points" (zero points) in the contest, the latter being a record the nation shared together with Austria. The country had finished last 10 times and had failed to score a point during four contests. Following the introduction of semi-finals in 2004, Norway has, to this point, finished in the top 10 twice: in 2005 when "In My Dreams" performed by Wig Wam finished ninth, and in 2008 when "Hold On Be Strong" by Maria Haukaas Storeng finished fifth.

As part of its duties as participating broadcaster, NRK organises the selection of its entry in the Eurovision Song Contest and broadcasts the event in the country. The broadcaster confirmed its intentions to participate at the 2009 contest on 9 June 2008. NRK has traditionally organised the national final Melodi Grand Prix to select its entry for the contest in all but one of its participation. Along with its participation confirmation, the broadcaster revealed details regarding its selection procedure and announced the organization of Melodi Grand Prix 2009 in order to select its 2009 entry.

== Before Eurovision ==
=== Melodi Grand Prix 2009 ===
Melodi Grand Prix 2009 was the 47th edition of the national final Melodi Grand Prix, organised by NRK to select its entry for the Eurovision Song Contest 2009. 21 songs were selected to compete in a five-week-long process that commenced on 24 January 2009 and concluded with the final on 21 February 2009. All shows were hosted by Per Sundnes and Maria Haukaas Storeng, who represented Norway in 2008, and televised on NRK1 as well as streamed online at NRK's official website nrk.no. The final was also broadcast online at the official Eurovision Song Contest website eurovision.tv.

==== Format ====
The competition consisted of five shows: three semi-finals on 24 January 2009, 31 January 2009 and 7 February 2009, a Last Chance round (Sistesjansen) on 14 February 2009 and a final on 21 February 2009. Seven songs competed in each semi-final and the top two entries directly qualified to the final, while the entries that placed third and fourth proceeded to the Last Chance round. Two wildcards were also awarded to proceed to the Last Chance round, one being the act that received the most votes out of the bottom three songs in the semi-finals and one selected by online voting held on the website of VG between 7 and 9 February 2009. An additional two entries qualified to the final from the Last Chance round. The results of the semi-finals and Last Chance round were determined exclusively by public televoting, while the results in the final were determined by jury voting and public televoting. Viewers could vote through telephone and SMS, and for the semi-finals, the public was able to cast their votes on the day before each show was broadcast.

==== Competing entries ====
A submission period was opened by NRK between 9 June 2008 and 1 September 2008. A new rule required songwriters to hold Norwegian citizenship or have permanent residency in Norway in order to be eligible to compete. Collaborations with foreign songwriters were permitted, however their percentage of contribution must not exceed 50%. Performers of the selected songs would be chosen by NRK in consultation with the songwriters, and the broadcaster reserved the right to directly invite certain artists and composers to compete in addition to the public call for submissions. At the close of the deadline, over 350 submissions were received. 21 songs were selected for the competition and their titles were revealed on 10 and 17 December 2008. The seven acts competing in each semi-final were revealed on 22 December 2008, 29 December 2008 and 5 January 2009, respectively, and among the artists was past Eurovision entrant Wenche Myhre who represented Germany in 1968.

Artist	Song	Songwriter(s)
Alexander Rybak	"Fairytale"	Alexander Rybak
Alexander Stenerud	"Find My Girl"	Alexander Stenerud
Charite	"Sweeter Than a Kiss"	Christian Ingebrigtsen, Laila Samuelsen
Chicas del Coro	"Men, Men, Men!"	Hilde Marstrander
Espen Hana	"Two of a Kind"	Trond Andreassen, Christian Bloom
Foxy	"Do It Again"	Hanne Sørvaag, Harry Sommerdahl
Jane Helen	"Shuffled"	Jane Helen, Christine Litle
Janni Santillan	"(Like You Did) Yesterday"	Janni Santillan
Julius Winger	"Like an Angel"	Julius Winger, Ole Jørgen Olsen
KeSera feat. Anita Hegerland	"Party"	Robin Nordahl, Thomas Ewel, KeSera
Ovi	"Seven Seconds"	Simone Larsen, Simen Eriksrud
Publiners	"Te stein"	Bertil Bertelsen, Olav Nygaard, Morten Horn, Ronny Bertelsen
Rebelettes	"Soul Train"	Rebelettes
Sichelle	"Left/Right"	Mats Lie Skåre
Sunny	"Carrie"	Solgunn Ivana, Hans Petter Aaserud
Surferosa	"U Look Good"	Surferosa, Lars-Erik Westby, Mariann Thomassen
Thomas Brøndbo	"Det vart en storm"	Svein Gundersen, Rolf Mokkelbost
Tine Wulff	"Ride"	Marte Wulff
Tone Damli Aaberge	"Butterflies"	David Eriksen, Billy Burnette, Tone Damli Aaberge, Mats Lie Skåre
Velvet Inc.	"Tricky"	Hanne Sørvaag, Niklas Bergwall, Niclas Kings
Wenche Myhre	"Alt har en mening nå"	Thomas Thörnholm, Michael Clauss, Danne Attlerud, Jan Vincent Johannessen

==== Semi-finals ====
Seven songs competed in each of the three semi-finals that took place on 24 January, 31 January and 7 February 2009. The first semi-final took place at the Kongsvinger Hall in Kongsvinger, the second semi-final took place at the Bodø Spektrum in Bodø, and the third semi-final took place at the Skien Fritidspark in Skien, Grenland. In each semi-final the top two directly qualified to the final, while the third and fourth placed songs proceeded to the Last Chance round. "Party" performed by KeSera featuring Anita Hegerland received the most votes out of the bottom three songs in the semi-finals and proceeded to the Last Chance round as a wildcard. Voting for the VG online wildcard ran between 7 and 9 February 2009, and 6,467 votes were registered. Wenche Myhre withdrew from the voting as she was unable to compete in the Last Chance round due to a concert in Portugal. KeSera featuring Hegerland won the voting with 24.58% of the votes, but since they have already been awarded one of the wildcards, "Do It Again" performed by Foxy, which came second with 23.58% of the votes, was awarded the VG wildcard and proceeded to the Last Chance round.

In addition to the performances of the competing entries, the first semi-final featured a tribute to the Norwegian 1987 entry "Mitt liv" performed by Kate Guldbrandsen, the second semi-final featured a tribute to the 1964 Melodi Grand Prix entry "La meg værre ung" performed by Wenche Myhre, and the interval act in the third semi-final featured Anita Skorgan, who represented Norway in 1977 and 1979, performing her 1979 entry "Oliver".

Semi-final 1 – 24 January 2009
R/O	Artist	Song	Result
1	Surferosa	"U Look Good"	Last Chance
2	Chicas del Coro	"Men, Men, Men!"	—N/a
3	KeSera feat. Anita Hegerland	"Party"	Last Chance
4	Espen Hana	"Two of a Kind"	Last Chance
5	Charite	"Sweeter Than a Kiss"	—N/a
6	Thomas Brøndbo	"Det vart en storm"	Final
7	Velvet Inc.	"Tricky"	Final

Semi-final 2 – 31 January 2009
R/O	Artist	Song	Result
1	Wenche Myhre	"Alt har en mening nå"	—N/a
2	Publiners	"Te stein"	Last Chance
3	Tine Wulff	"Ride"	—N/a
4	Alexander Stenerud	"Find My Girl"	Final
5	Janni Santillan	"(Like You Did) Yesterday"	Last Chance
6	Julius Winger	"Like an Angel"	—N/a
7	Tone Damli Aaberge	"Butterflies"	Final

Semi-final 3 – 7 February 2009
R/O	Artist	Song	Result
1	Sichelle	"Left/Right"	—N/a
2	Rebelettes	"Soul Train"	—N/a
3	Ovi	"Seven Seconds"	Final
4	Jane Helen	"Shuffled"	Last Chance
5	Foxy	"Do It Again"	Last Chance
6	Sunny	"Carrie"	Last Chance
7	Alexander Rybak	"Fairytale"	Final

==== Last Chance round ====
The Last Chance round took place on 14 February 2009 at the Sunnmørshallen in Ålesund. The six entries that placed third and fourth in the preceding three semi-finals as well as the two wildcards competed and the two entries that qualified to the final were selected over two rounds of voting. In the first round, the eight entries competed in four duels and the winners of each duel proceeded to the second round. In the second round, the remaining four entries competed in two duels and the winners of each duel qualified to the final.

First Round – 14 February 2009
Duel	R/O	Artist	Song	Result
I	1	KeSera feat. Anita Hegerland	"Party"	—N/a
I	2	Espen Hana	"Two of a Kind"	Second Round
II	3	Janni Santillan	"(Like You Did) Yesterday"	—N/a
II	4	Surferosa	"U Look Good"	Second Round
III	5	Sunny	"Carrie"	—N/a
III	6	Publiners	"Te stein"	Second Round
IV	7	Foxy	"Do It Again"	—N/a
IV	8	Jane Helen	"Shuffled"	Second Round

Second Round – 14 February 2009
Duel	R/O	Artist	Song	Result
I	1	Espen Hana	"Two of a Kind"	Final
I	2	Surferosa	"U Look Good"	—N/a
II	1	Publiners	"Te stein"	Final
II	2	Jane Helen	"Shuffled"	—N/a

==== Final ====
Eight songs that qualified from the preceding three semi-finals and the Last Chance round competed during the final at the Oslo Spektrum in Oslo on 21 February 2009. Before the final, the group Velvet changed their name to Velvet Inc. in order to avoid confusion with Swedish singer Velvet who was competing in Melodifestivalen 2009. The winner was selected over two rounds of voting. In the first round, the top four entries were selected by public televoting to proceed to the second round, the Gold Final. In the Gold Final, four regional juries from the three semi-final and Last Chance round host cities each distributed points as follows: 2,000, 4,000, 6,000 and 8,000 points. The results of the public televote were then revealed by Norway's five regions and added to the jury scores, leading to the victory of "Fairytale" performed by Alexander Rybak with 747,888 votes. In addition to the performances of the competing entries, the interval act featured a medley performed by host Maria Haukaas Storeng.

After winning Melodi Grand Prix 2009, "Fairytale" reached number one on the VG-lista singles chart, making it the first time in the history of Melodi Grand Prix that the winning song reached the top of the charts before winning the contest.

Final – 21 February 2009
R/O	Artist	Song	Result
1	Espen Hana	"Two of a Kind"	—N/a
2	Ovi	"Seven Seconds"	—N/a
3	Publiners	"Te stein"	Gold Final
4	Alexander Stenerud	"Find My Girl"	Gold Final
5	Velvet Inc.	"Tricky"	—N/a
6	Alexander Rybak	"Fairytale"	Gold Final
7	Thomas Brøndbo	"Det vart en storm"	—N/a
8	Tone Damli Aaberge	"Butterflies"	Gold Final

Gold Final – 21 February 2009
R/O	Artist	Song	Jury	Televote	Total	Place
1	Publiners	"Te stein"	12,000	50,683	62,683	4
2	Alexander Stenerud	"Find My Girl"	14,000	59,080	73,080	3
3	Alexander Rybak	"Fairytale"	32,000	715,888	747,888	1
4	Tone Damli Aaberge	"Butterflies"	22,000	99,850	121,850	2

Detailed Regional Jury Votes
R/O	Song	Kongsvinger	Bodø	Grenland	Ålesund	Total
1	"Te stein"	2,000	6,000	2,000	2,000	12,000
2	"Find My Girl"	4,000	2,000	4,000	4,000	14,000
3	"Fairytale"	8,000	8,000	8,000	8,000	32,000
4	"Butterflies"	6,000	4,000	6,000	6,000	22,000
Spokespersons
Kongsvinger – Kate Gulbrandsen; Bodø – Guri Schanke; Grenland – Hanne Hoftun; Ålesund – Inge Solmo

Detailed Regional Televoting Results
R/O	Song	North	West	Central	South	East	Total
1	"Te stein"	6,630	3,702	8,945	7,937	23,469	50,683
2	"Find My Girl"	3,790	5,432	8,135	10,993	30,730	59,080
3	"Fairytale"	42,211	60,679	101,381	132,683	378,934	715,888
4	"Butterflies"	5,631	9,698	16,040	18,829	49,658	99,850
Spokespersons
Northern Norway – Hallvard Holmen; Western Norway – Stig van Eijk; Central Norway – Alf Gunnar Nilsen; Southern Norway – Torstein Sødal; Eastern Norway – Knut Anders Sørum

==== Ratings ====
Viewing figures by show
Show	Date	Viewers (in millions)	Ref.
Semi-final 1	24 January 2009	1.032	
Semi-final 2	31 January 2009	1.085	
Semi-final 3	7 February 2009	1.010	
Last Chance	14 February 2009	1.028	
Final	21 February 2009	1.519	

=== Preparation and promotion ===
On 14 March, the music video for "Fairytale" showing Alexander Rybak's performance at Melodi Grand Prix 2009 was released to the public. To promote his Eurovision participation, Rybak appeared as a guest at the concert of four-time Eurovision entrant Elisabeth Andreassen, which was held at the Oslo Concert Hall on 6 April. Approaching the contest, Rybak garnered international media attention especially in Russia, with a crew from Russian television channel NTV traveling to Oslo in April to record a documentary on the singer that later aired during the programme Glavnyy geroy. Further media attention was made in the United States where he was featured in reports on The Oprah Winfrey Show and The World's Got Talent.

== At Eurovision ==
According to Eurovision rules, all nations with the exceptions of the host country and the "Big Four" (France, Germany, Spain, and the United Kingdom) are required to qualify from one of two semi-finals in order to compete for the final; the top nine songs from each semi-final as determined by televoting progress to the final, and a tenth was determined by back-up juries. The European Broadcasting Union (EBU) split up the competing countries into six different pots based on voting patterns from previous contests, with countries with favourable voting histories put into the same pot. On 30 January 2009, an allocation draw was held which placed each country into one of the two semi-finals. Norway was placed into the second semi-final, to be held on 14 May 2009. The running order for the semi-finals was decided through another draw on 16 March 2009 and Norway was set to perform in position 6, following the entry from Poland and before the entry from Cyprus.

In Norway, the two semi-finals and the final were broadcast on NRK1 with commentary by Synnøve Svabø. NRK appointed Stian Barsnes-Simonsen as its spokesperson to announce the Norwegian votes during the final. In the aftermath of the show, Svabø was criticized for chattering while the Russian hosts were speaking, and for some vulgar comments. During the coverage of the voting, Svabø was heard on live television making phone calls to Rolf Løvland, Elisabeth Andreassen, Hanne Krogh, Trond Giske, Hans Bjerkås and Jens Stoltenberg. Several Norwegian viewers reported that they had switched to the Swedish commentary on SVT1.

=== Semi-final ===
Alexander Rybak took part in technical rehearsals on 5 and 7 May, followed by dress rehearsals on 13 and 14 May. The Norwegian performance featured Alexander Rybak performing on stage with a violin and dressed in a black waistcoat with a white shirt and black trousers. Rybak was joined on stage by three dancers that performed a series of artistic folk dance routines and acrobatics and two backing vocalists. The LED screens displayed a night view of traditional wooden Norwegian houses lighting up with the moon and stars above and fireworks going off. The three dancers on stage with Alexander Rybak were members of the Frikar Dance Company: Hallgrim Hansegård, Sigbjørn Rua and Torkjell Lunde, while the two backing vocalists were Jorunn Hauge and Karianne Kjærnes.

At the end of the show, Norway was announced as having finished in the top 10 and subsequently qualifying for the grand final. It was later revealed that Norway placed first in the semi-final, receiving a total of 201 points. The second semi-final was watched by 1.206 million viewers in Norway with a market share of 64%.

=== Final ===
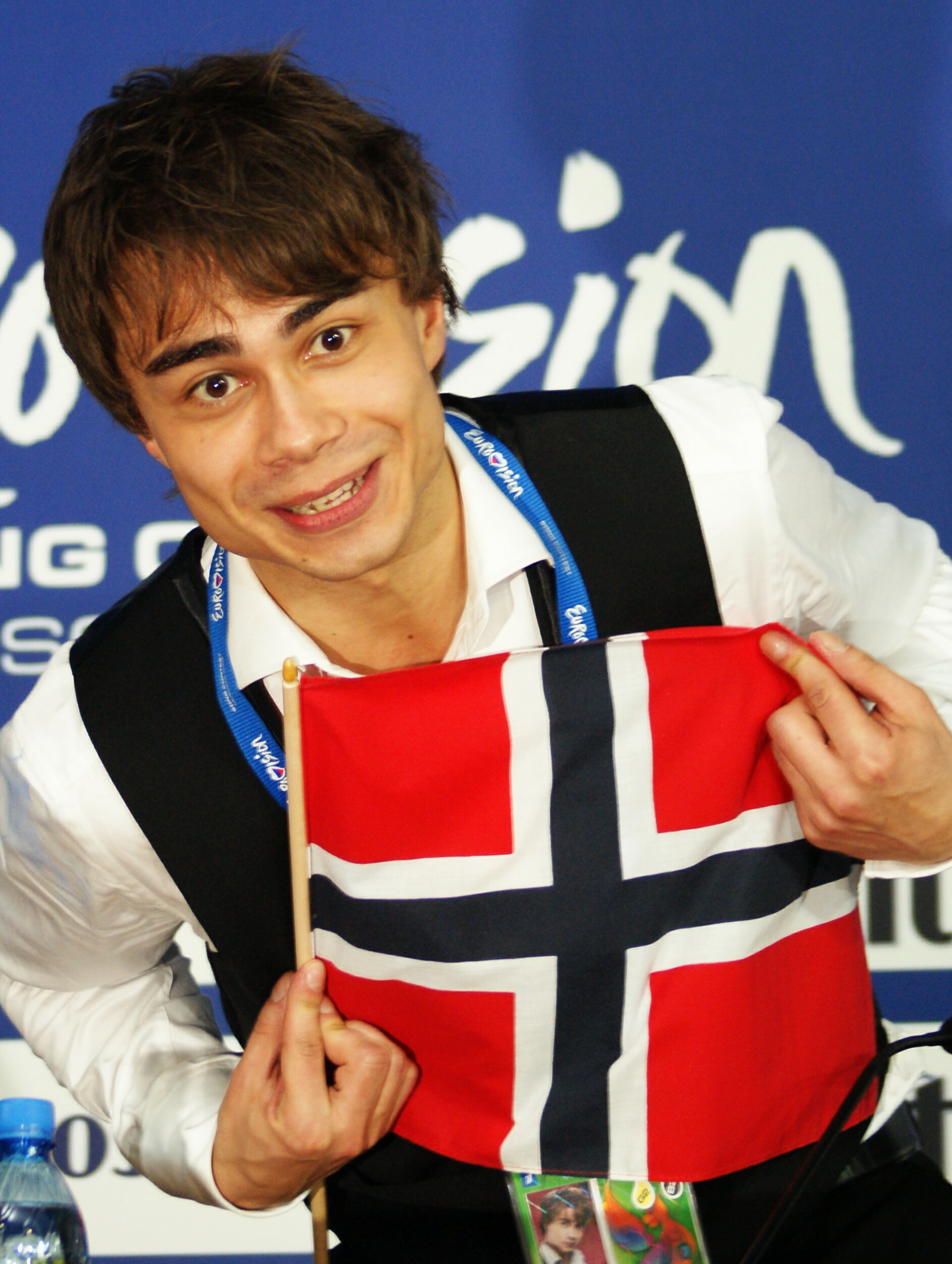
Alexander Rybak during the winner's press conference

Shortly after the second semi-final, a winners' press conference was held for the ten qualifying countries. As part of this press conference, the qualifying artists took part in a draw to determine the running order for the final. This draw was done in the order the countries appeared in the semi-final running order. Norway was drawn to perform in position 20, following the entry from Albania and before the entry from Ukraine.

Alexander Rybak once again took part in dress rehearsals on 15 and 16 May before the final, including the jury final where the professional juries cast their final votes before the live show. Alexander Rybak performed a repeat of his semi-final performance during the final on 16 May. At the conclusion of the voting, Norway won the contest placing first with a score of 387 points. This was Norway's third victory in the Eurovision Song Contest; their recent victory was in 1995. The final was watched by 2.011 million viewers in Norway with a market share of 88%, making it the most watched Eurovision final in Norway since 1996 when the contest was held in Oslo. Viewership increased to 2.292 million during the voting.

=== Voting ===
The voting system for 2009 involved each country awarding points from 1-8, 10 and 12, with the points in the final being decided by a combination of 50% national jury and 50% televoting. Each nation's jury consisted of five music industry professionals who are citizens of the country they represent. This jury judged each entry based on: vocal capacity; the stage performance; the song's composition and originality; and the overall impression by the act. In addition, no member of a national jury was permitted to be related in any way to any of the competing acts in such a way that they cannot vote impartially and independently. In the final, Norway's vote was based on 100 percent jury voting due to technical issues with the televoting. Telenor promised to refund the cost of the vote to the Norwegian voters, which totalled 1.36 million Norwegian krone.

Following the release of the full split voting by the EBU after the conclusion of the competition, it was revealed that Norway had placed first with both the public televote and the jury vote in the final. In the public vote, Norway scored 378 points, while with the jury vote, Norway scored 312 points.

Below is a breakdown of points awarded to Norway and awarded by Norway in the second semi-final and grand final of the contest. The nation awarded its 12 points to Denmark in the semi-final and to Iceland in the final of the contest.

==== Points awarded to Norway ====
Points awarded to Norway (Semi-final 2)
Score	Country
12 points	Azerbaijan; Denmark; Estonia; Lithuania; Netherlands; Spain
10 points	Hungary; Latvia; Moldova; Poland; Russia; Slovakia; Ukraine
8 points	Albania; Croatia; Cyprus; Greece; Ireland; Serbia; Slovenia
7 points	
6 points	
5 points	
4 points	
3 points	France
2 points	
1 point	

Points awarded to Norway (Final)
Score	Country
12 points	Belarus; Denmark; Estonia; Germany; Hungary; Iceland; Israel; Latvia; Lithuania; Netherlands; Poland; Russia; Slovenia; Spain; Sweden; Ukraine
10 points	Andorra; Belgium; Bosnia and Herzegovina; Cyprus; Greece; Montenegro; Serbia; Slovakia; United Kingdom
8 points	Armenia; Azerbaijan; Croatia; Finland; France; Ireland; Macedonia; Malta; Moldova; Switzerland
7 points	Albania
6 points	
5 points	Portugal; Romania
4 points	
3 points	Czech Republic; Turkey
2 points	Bulgaria
1 point	

==== Points awarded by Norway ====
Points awarded by Norway (Semi-final 2)
Score	Country
12 points	Denmark
10 points	Moldova
8 points	Estonia
7 points	Lithuania
6 points	Azerbaijan
5 points	Albania
4 points	Ireland
3 points	Poland
2 points	Serbia
1 point	Greece

Points awarded by Norway (Final)
Score	Country
12 points	Iceland
10 points	Azerbaijan
8 points	Denmark
7 points	Turkey
6 points	Germany
5 points	Ukraine
4 points	Sweden
3 points	Moldova
2 points	United Kingdom
1 point	France

==== Detailed voting results ====
The Norwegian televoting results were released by the EBU in July 2009, however these were not able to be incorporated in the Norwegian points given during the contest. The below table outlines how the Norwegian points would have been calculated had the televoting results been ready. With these combined points, although the overall winner of the contest would not have changed, Bosnia and Herzegovina would have achieved 8th place instead of France, Denmark would have achieved 12th place instead of Ukraine, and Sweden would have achieved 20th place instead of Germany.

The following members comprised the Norwegian jury:

- Ellen Marie Steen – journalist at NRK P1
- Jørn Johansen – program director for P4
- Elisabet Davidsen – project leader for music at the department of culture of NRK P2
- Arne Martin Vistnes – journalist at Radio Norge
- Vivi Stenberg – producer, Head of Duty at NRK P3

Detailed voting results from Norway (Final)
R/O	Country	Results			Combined points	Points awarded
R/O	Country	Jury	Televoting	Combined	Combined points	Points awarded
01	Lithuania		1	1		
02	Israel					
03	France	1		1		1
04	Sweden	4	8	12	6	4
05	Croatia		5	5	3	
06	Portugal					
07	Iceland	12	12	24	12	12
08	Greece					
09	Armenia					
10	Russia					
11	Azerbaijan	10	4	14	7	10
12	Bosnia and Herzegovina		10	10	5	
13	Moldova	3	2	5	2	3
14	Malta					
15	Estonia		3	3		
16	Denmark	8	6	14	8	8
17	Germany	6		6	4	6
18	Turkey	7	7	14	10	7
19	Albania					
20	Norway					
21	Ukraine	5		5	1	5
22	Romania					
23	United Kingdom	2		2		2
24	Finland					
25	Spain					
