= Stig Gustu Larsen =

Norwegian singer

Stig Gustu Larsen, born in 1986 in Hedmark, Norway, is a singer as well as a songwriter best known for his participation in season 5 of The Voice Norway. Larsen started playing guitar and drums at the age of 5, and is the former front-man of the rock band Gustu, signed with FAJo Records in 2019.

== Early life ==
In 2005 he formed the band Gustu, after having a minor hit with the song "Jupiter & Mars". The song debuted at NRK P3 in November 2005. The first tour for the band was as support for legendary shock-rockers Surferosa.

== Career ==
Later on, the band signed with 272 Records in Los Angeles and released the song "Love/Hate Collide", which aired on local radio stations in California, USA. The song was later released in Asia, as the band signed with October Party Records. The band did a significant tour in China in 2010. "Love/Hate Collide" made it to the top of the Norwegian music chart "Topp 8" on NRK P1 (H/O) and was number one for 10 weeks, followed by two weeks at number two. After releasing the single "Next December", the band did a few shows in Norway, before the last farewell show at the Hard Rock Café in Oslo, Norway.

Stig Gustu Larsen started recording new songs in 2014. The first single, Finding Home, was released in September 12, 2014, and debuted at number 9 on the Norwegian iTunes charts. Finding Home debuted at 89.5 Subic Bay Radio in the Philippines in September 2014. The full EP was released November 21, 2014 and includes four tracks:

1. Falling
2. Over You
3. Finding Home
4. The Dissolution

Stig recorded all the instruments, wrote all the songs and sang all the vocals. Stig is also the producer of the record. The mix was done by Stig Gustu Larsen and Blake Eiseman, and the mastering was handled by Colin Leonard, the both of which have nominated for and have won several awards.

The EP debuted at number 5 on the iTunes album charts. Late in 2014 and out into 2015, Stig did his first solo tour in cities like Oslo, Bergen, Trondheim and Hamar. Stig also did a live performance at NRK, TV2<, Nettavisen.no, Radio Riks and Radio Randsfjord.

In November 2015, the single "The Stars Align Tonight" was released. The song was performed on NRK TV and radio in September 2015.

The second EP, "Lifelines + Echoes", debuted at number 1 at the Norwegian iTunes charts and included a total of five tracks:

1. City of Ember
2. Come Home
3. Lifeline
4. Next Year
5. Walk it off

Radio Riks Oslo aired the whole record, from start to finish, in a Stig Gustu Larsen special episode on the date of the release.

The third EP, “Oslo+Live”, was recorded live at Uhørt in Oslo. The EP included the following four tracks:

1. The Way I Love You
2. Last day of june
3. Next Year
4. Finding Home (bonus track – Live from Radio Riks)

== The Voice ==
Stig Gustu Larsen was a contestant on The Voice (season 5) on TV2 Norge in 2019. Stig was a part of "Team-Lene" (Lene Marlin) and performed the Bon Jovi classic Bed of Roses as his blind audition. Later he performed songs like "Falling Slowly" and "Sign of The Times" by Harry Styles.

== Discography ==
Album

- 2010: Love/Hate Collide (aka GUSTU) (China) (GUSTU)
- 2018: "'Love + Hate Collide – The GUSTU Chronicles (Best of) (GUSTU)

Compilations

- 2008: Riot on Sunset (USA) 272 Records (GUSTU)
- 2009: Det beste fra Hedmark (Norway) (GUSTU)
- 2010: Norwegian Wood (China) (GUSTU)
- 2011: Sounds from the underground Vol 1 (Norway) (GUSTU)

Singles

- 2009: Love/Hate Collide (USA/Norway) (GUSTU)
- 2010: Love/Hate Collide (China) (GUSTU)
- 2012: Losing Control (GUSTU)
- 2013: Better (GUSTU)
- 2013: Next December (GUSTU)
- 2014: Finding Home (solo) (Debuted at No. 9 on the Norwegian iTunes Charts)
- 2015: The Stars Align Tonight (solo)
- 2017: Christmas Morning (solo)
- 2018: Bodies Stand Up (solo) (Debuted at No. 1 on the Norwegian iTunes Charts)
- 2019: Bed of Roses (The Voice Norway 2019)
- 2019: Sign of The Times (The Voice Norway 2019)
- 2019: Falling Slowly (The Voice Norway 2019)
- 2019: WE

EP

- 2009: "Love/Hate Collide" (GUSTU)
- 2013: "White Noise" (GUSTU)
- 2014: Finding Home (solo) (Debuted at No. 5 on the Norwegian iTunes Charts)
- 2016: Lifelines + Echoes (solo)(Debuted at No. 1 on the Norwegian iTunes Charts)
- 2017: Oslo+Live (solo) (Debuted at No. 9 on the Norwegian iTunes Charts)
- 2018: One for my Baby (One More for the Road) (solo) (Debuted at No. 1 on the Norwegian Jazz iTunes Charts)
