= Yes Man (song) =

Single by Bjørn Johan Muri

from the album Airwaves
- Released: 8 January 2010
- Genre: Pop
- Length: 3:13
- Label: Universal Music
- Songwriters: Simone Larsen, Simen Eriksrud, Bjørn Johan Muri

Bjørn Johan Muri singles chronology
"The Beauty of Who You Are" (2009)	"Yes Man" (2010)	"Circles" (2010)

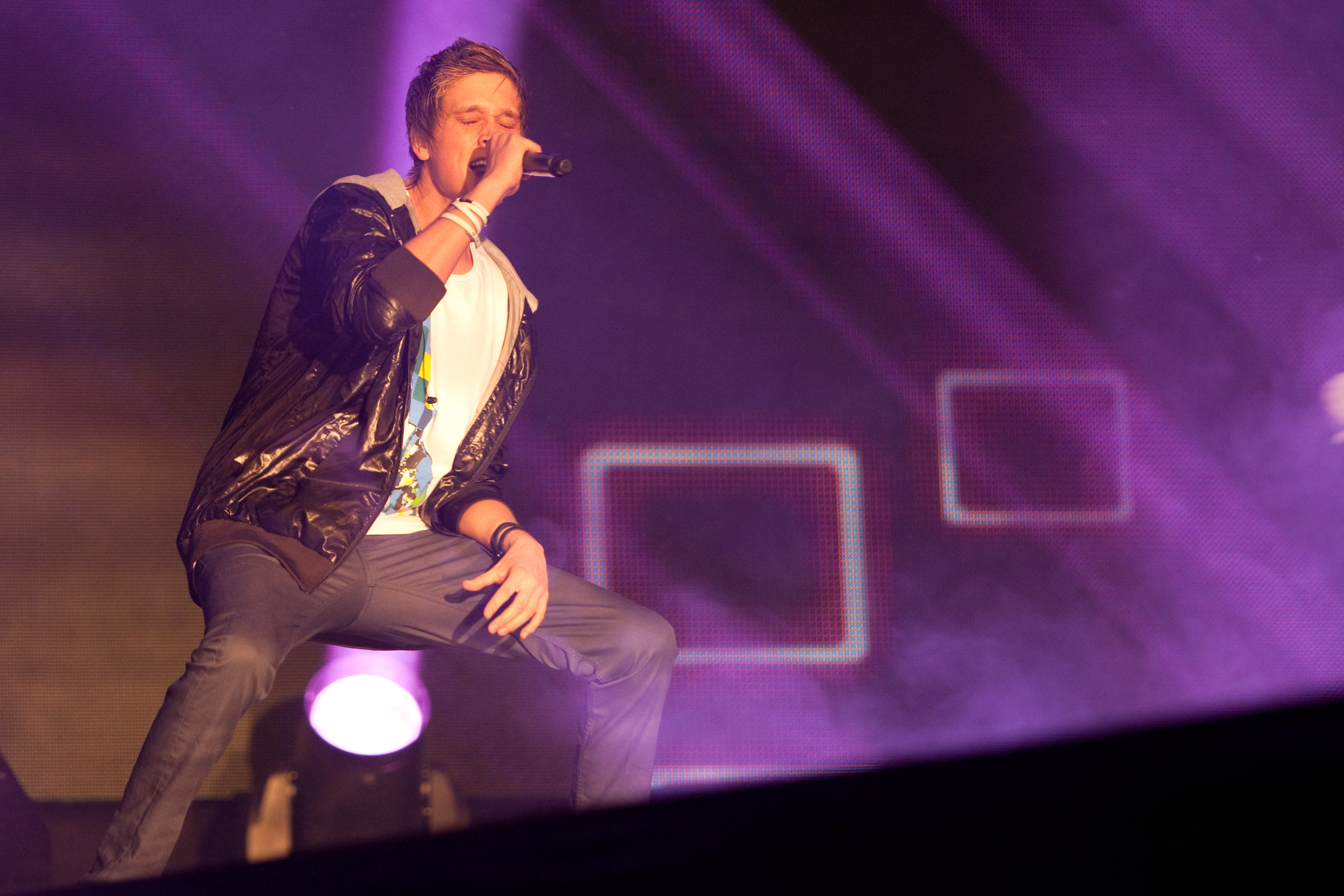
Bjørn Johan Muri performing ”Yes Man” in 2010

"Yes Man" is an English language hit single by Norwegian singer Bjørn Johan Muri, written by Simone Larsen, Simen Eriksrud, and Muri himself. The song took part in the Norwegian contest Melodi Grand Prix 2010, held to select the Norwegian entry for the Eurovision Song Contest 2010, finishing fourth in the final on 6 February 2010. The eventual winner was Didrik Solli-Tangen with the song My Heart Is Yours.

Amid its bid to represent Norway in Eurovision, the song proved to be commercially successful, staying at the top of Norwegian Singles Chart in February and March 2010.

== Charts ==
=== Weekly charts ===
Weekly chart performance for "Yes Man"
Chart (2010)	Peak position
Denmark (Tracklisten)	30
Norway (VG-lista)	1
