= Alexander Stenerud =

Norwegian singer-songwriter (born 1975

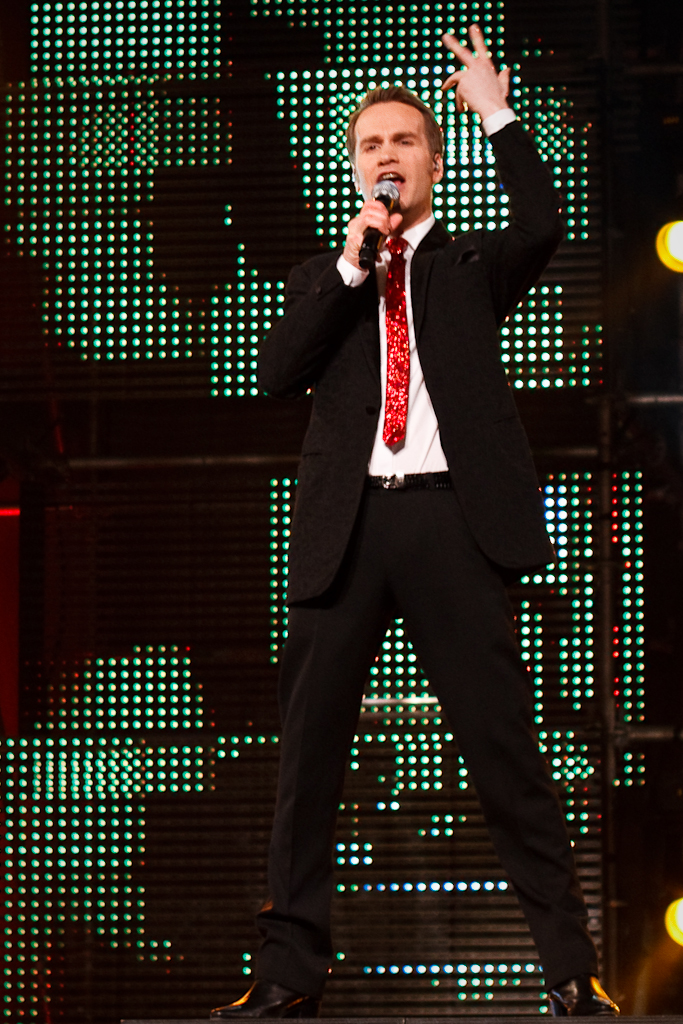
Alexander Stenerud

Alexander Stenerud (born 2 May 1975) is a Norwegian-Danish singer-songwriter.

Stenerud is known as a member of the pop due Zuma, formed in 1995 with Henrik Njaa after winning a demo competition on Norwegian radio station NRK P3. They released two albums, Juno in 2001 and Rainboy in 2003, and took part in Melodi Grand Prix, the Norwegian selection for the Eurovision Song Contest in 2008, qualifying to the Siste Sjansen (Last Chance) round.

In 2009 Stenerud competed in Melodi Grand Prix as a solo singer, with the song "Find My Girl", finishing in third place in the final behind Alexander Rybak and Tone Damli Aaberge. In 2010 he took part in the Contest once again as a solo artist, with the song "Give It To Me", qualifying to the final from the second semi-final.

Alexander Stenerud's first album as a solo artist "Far Away From Tomorrow" was launched 13 November 2015.
