= Simone Eriksrud =

Norwegian musical artist

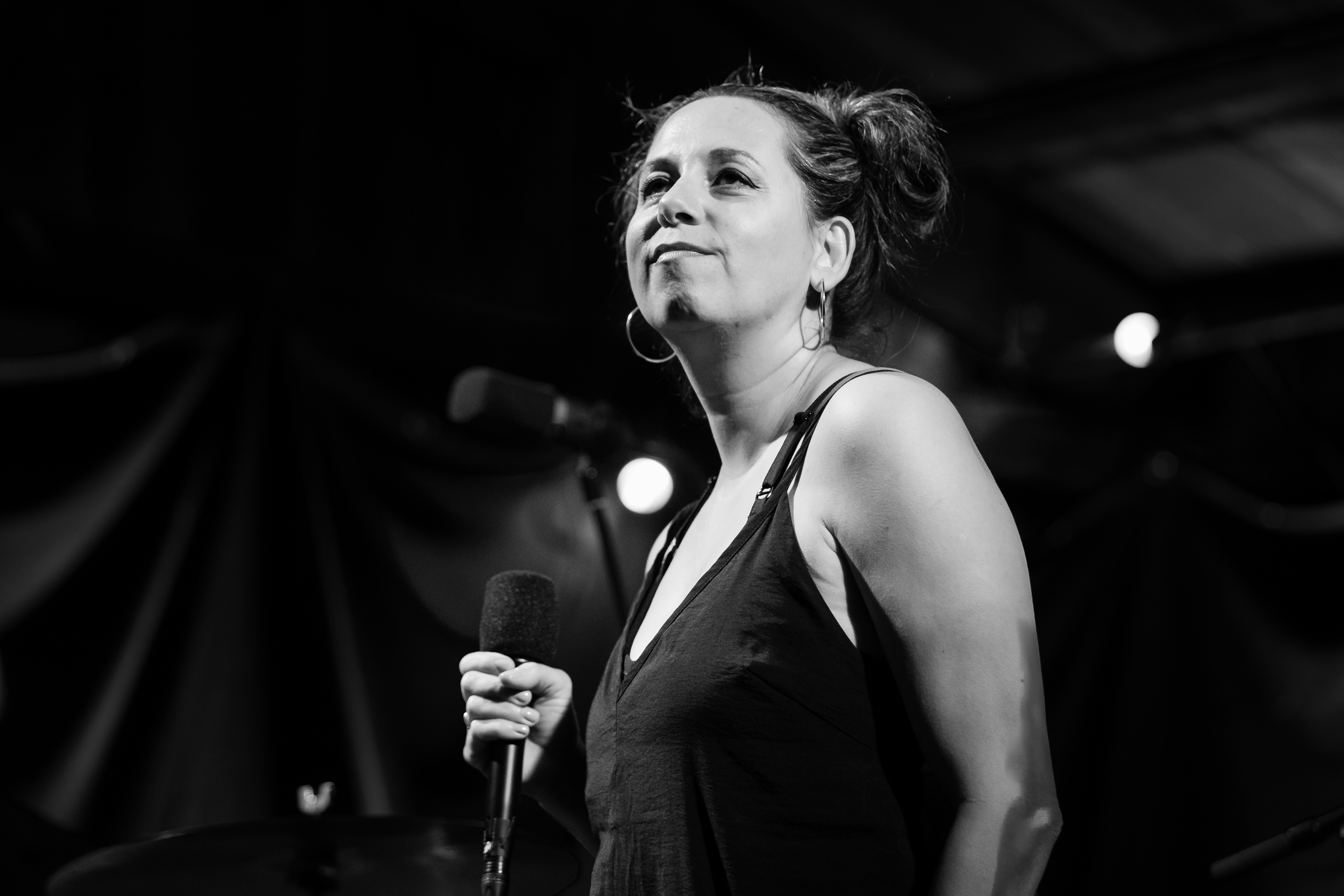
- Simone Eriksrud performing in 2023; Photo: Tore Sætre

Background information
- Born: Simone Larsen; 21 August 1970 (age 56); Freiburg, Germany
- Origin: Volda, Norway
- Genres: Jazz, soul
- Occupations: Musician, singer, composer
- Instruments: Vocals, guitar
- Member of: D'Sound

Simone Eriksrud (née Larsen; born 21 August 1970) is a Norwegian musician, singer and composer from Volda Municipality, and a member of D'Sound. She was earlier in her career known as Simone Larsen or just with the mononym Simone.

== Career ==
=== In D'Sound ===
As Simone Larsen, she is best known as the lead singer and guitarist of the Norwegian band D'Sound often stylized as d'sound. The band was established by drummer Kim Ofstad and bassist Jonny Sjo in 1993 with Larsen on lead vocals. To date, the band has released seven studio albums, namely Spice of Life (1996), Beauty Is a Blessing (1998), Talkin' Talk (2001), Doublehearted (2003), My Today (2005), Starts and Ends (2009) and Signs (2014) in addition to the live album D'Sound – Live at Rockefeller Music Hall 2001 and a compilation album Smooth Escapes – The Very Best of D'Sound in 2004. In June 2018, she announced her departure to spend more time with the rest of her family. The band became a duo. She returned in 2022 as a touring member and collaborated with the duo for the song titled "Flashback", the third single from the album 25 (2022) which commemorates their 25th anniversary since the band's debut in 1997.

=== Solo career ===
Besides her career in D'Sound, Simone, which is her artist name, has also opted for a solo career and released her debut solo album The Last Days and Nights in 2004. Neither this album or the single "The Last Days and Nights of Rock 'n' Roll" achieved any great interest or a significant sales. In the same year she was invited to be a part of the 3rd season of the reality show Hver gang vi møtes, which was broadcast on the Norwegian TV channel TV 2, where both D'Sound and her own songs were performed by well known Norwegian performers.

In 2008, Simone also collaborated on the album Magiske kroker & hemmeligheter with music for children, produced by Linn Skåber and Jacob Young, with the tune "Vinteren er her". Other artists who participated were Alexander Rybak, Maria Haukaas Storeng, Egil Hegerberg, Venke Knutson, Alejandro Fuentes, Julius Winger, Live Maria Roggen, Jørn Christensen, Paal Flaata and Andrea Bræin Hovig.

== Personal life ==
Simone has a Turkish father and German mother, and grew up in the small village of Bischoffingen in Baden at the French border, together with her mother and grandparents. When she was eight, in 1979, her mother married a Norwegian and they moved to Volda in Norway. Until 2002 she was a German citizen, but since then she has been a Norwegian citizen.

Simone is married to Norwegian pianist, songwriter and producer Simen Eriksrud, a member of the production duo Seeb, and they have two children together.

== Discography ==
=== Solo albums ===
- 2005: Last Days And Nights (Passasjen Records)

=== Collaborations ===
With D'Sound

- 1996: Spice of Life (PolyGram)
- 1998: Beauty Is A Blessing (PolyGram)
- 2001: Talkin' Talk (Virgin Records)
- 2001: Live at Rockefeller Music Hall 2001 (Virgin Records)
- 2003: Doublehearted (Da Works)
- 2004: Smooth Escapes – The Very Best of D'Sound (Da Works)
- 2005: My Today (Da Works)
- 2009: Starts And Ends (FarGo Music)
- 2014: Signs (RCA/Sony Music)
- 2022: 25 (RCA/Sony Music)

With Savoy

- 1996: Mary Is Coming (Warner Bros. Records)
- 2007: Savoy Songbook Vol. 1 (Universal Music)

With A-ha

2000: Minor Earth, Major Sky (Warner Bros. Records)

With Bjørn Eidsvåg

2006: Nåde (Petroleum Records)

With Donkeyboy

- 2009: Caught in a Life (Warner Bros. Records)
- 2012: Silver Moon (Warner Bros. Records)

With Bjørn Johan Muri

2009: Airwaves (Universal Music)

With Melody Club

2011: Human Harbour (Electric Records)

With Eric Saade

2013: Forgive Me (Roxy Recordings)

With Marion Raven

- 2013: Songs From a Blackbird (Blackbird Music / Sony Music Norway)
- 2014: Scandal, Vol.1 (Blackbird Music / RCA)
- 2015: Scandal, Vol.2 (Blackbird Music / RCA)
