= My Boobs Are OK =

Single by Lene Alexandra

from the album Welcome To Sillycone Valley
- B-side: "My Boobs Are OK (Lars Larsen Remix)"
- Released: (Norway) March 8, 2007
- Recorded: 2006–07
- Genre: electropop; dance-pop; electroclash
- Length: 2:49 (A); 3:16 (B); 6:05 (total)
- Label: C+C Records; The Dance Division
- Songwriters: Lene Alexandra, Urban Robertsson, Tommy Berre, Stanley Ferdinandez
- Producers: Lene Alexandra, Tommy Berre

Lene Alexandra singles chronology
"My Boobs Are OK" (2007)	"Hot Boy Hot Girl" (2007)

"My Boobs Are OK" is a 2007 hit single by Norwegian singer Lene Alexandra.

== Origin ==
The initial idea for the song came in summer 2006, when Lene Alexandra was playing football. She hit one of her breasts, and after a few days someone asked her in Norwegian: "Is your boob okay?", to which Lene Alexandra answered in English: "Yes, my boobs are okay".

== Music video ==
The partially animated music video was made by Marcel Lelienhof (husband of Norwegian artist Mia Gundersen), Rasmus Sivertsen and Qvisten Animasjon on request by label owner and Norwegian TV personality Christer Falck. The video features Lene Alexandra wearing skimpy clothes in an office, and in other scenes as a nurse in between flashes of the animated parts.

== Chart positions ==
- # 3 (Norway)
- # 5 (Finland)
- # 14 (Denmark)
- # 20 (Sweden)
- # 100 (Netherlands)

== Compilations ==
- McMusic 39 (? 2007)
- Summer Hitz 3 (The Dance Division 2007)
- Tuning Hitz 2 (The Dance Division 2007)
- Summer Heat (Edel 2007)
- POPCORN Hits Lato 2007 (? 2007)
- Everybody Dance Now No. 1 (? 2007)
- Dirty Work 2 (The Dance Division 2007)
