= Per Sundnes =

Norwegian journalist

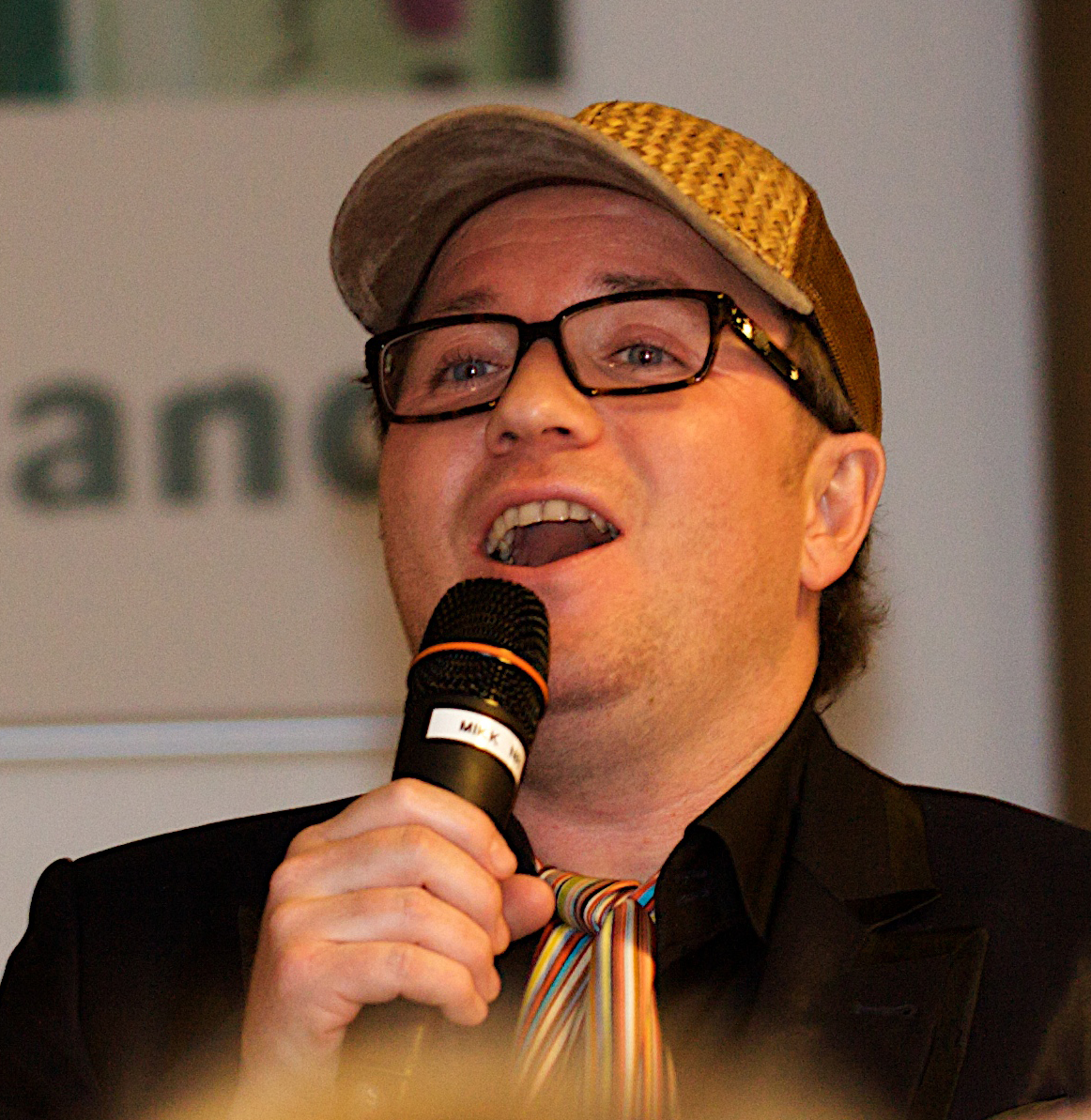
- Born: Per André Sundnes; 16 June 1966 (age 59); Bodø, Norway
- Occupations: Journalist; presenter
- Partner: Tore Lenngren

Per André Sundnes (born 16 June 1966 in Bodø) is a Norwegian journalist and talk show host. He is often described as a trend and pop culture expert with a particular interest for music and fashion.

== Eurovision commentator ==
In autumn 2006 it became known that Sundnes from 2007 would take over the job as the commentator in Melodi Grand Prix and the Norwegian commentator for the Eurovision Song Contest, after Jostein Pedersen. Sundnes' first shows were the Melodi Grand Prix 2007 and the Eurovision Song Contest 2007 in Helsinki, Finland. It was announced in December 2007 that Sundnes would not be commentating the 2008 Eurovision finals. The reason given was that both Sundnes and previous commentator Jostein Pedersen were strong personalities with a colorful language, and NRK wanted someone more anonymous, as they didn't want the commentator to overshadow the songs in the competition. Sundnes did however host the four Norwegian semi-finals and the final, in the national selection, Melodi Grand Prix 2008. In 2009 he co-hosted, with Maria Haukaas Storeng (the Norwegian representative at Eurovision in 2008), the Melodi Grand Prix 2009. In addition, he was also part of the team that followed Alexander Rybak to the Eurovision 2009 in Moscow, Russia. He will return to Melodi Grand Prix in 2010 as host as well, now joined by Marte Stokstad, and in 2011 as a host with Anne Rimmen.

== Career ==
Sundnes has a bachelor's degree in film and tv at the London Institute.

Before he became a journalist in the Norwegian broadcasting Corporation NRK he worked as a teacher. Since 2002 he has been the music and trend commentator in the show Store Studio on NRK.

In 2005 he authored the book Chic og bruk, which he co-wrote with journalist Lillian Vatnøy.
