= Norway in the Eurovision Song Contest 2008 =

- Eurovision Song Contest 2008
- Participating broadcaster: Norsk rikskringkasting (NRK)
- Country: Norway
- Selection process: Melodi Grand Prix 2008
- Selection date: 9 February 2008

Competing entry
- Song: "Hold On Be Strong"
- Artist: Maria Haukaas Storeng
- Songwriters: Mira Craig

Placement
- Semi-final result: Qualified (4th, 106 points)
- Final result: 5th, 182 points

Participation chronology

Norway was represented at the Eurovision Song Contest 2008 with the song "Hold On Be Strong", written by Mira Craig, and performed by Maria Haukaas Storeng. The Norwegian participating broadcaster, Norsk rikskringkasting (NRK), organised the national final Melodi Grand Prix 2008 in order to select its entry for the contest. 18 entries competed in the national final that consisted of three semi-finals, a Last Chance round and a final. Eight entries ultimately qualified to compete in the final on 9 February 2008 where the winner was determined over two rounds of voting. In the first round of voting, a public televote exclusively selected the top four entries to advance to the competition's second round—the Gold Final. In the second round of voting, "Hold On Be Strong" performed by Maria Haukaas Storeng was selected as the winner following the combination of votes from three regional jury groups and a public televote.

Norway was drawn to compete in the first semi-final of the Eurovision Song Contest which took place on 20 May 2008. Performing during the show in position 9, "Hold On Be Strong" was announced among the 10 qualifying entries of the first semi-final and therefore qualified to compete in the final on 24 May. It was later revealed that Norway placed fourth out of the 19 participating countries in the semi-final with 106 points. In the final, Norway performed last during the event in position 25, and placed fifth out of the 25 participating countries with 182 points.

== Background ==
Prior to the 2008 contest, Norsk rikskringkasting (NRK) had participated in the Eurovision Song Contest representing Norway 46 times since its first entry in 1960. It had won the contest on two occasions: in 1985 with the song "La det swinge" performed by Bobbysocks!, and in 1995 with the song "Nocturne" performed by Secret Garden. It also had the two dubious distinctions of having finished last in the Eurovision final more than any other country and for having the most "nul points" (zero points) in the contest, the latter being a record the nation shared together with Austria. The country had finished last 10 times and had failed to score a point during four contests. Following the introduction of semi-finals in 2004, Norway has, to this point, finished in the top 10 once: in 2005 when "In My Dreams" performed by Wig Wam finished ninth.

As part of its duties as participating broadcaster, NRK organises the selection of its entry in the Eurovision Song Contest and broadcasts the event in the country. The broadcaster confirmed its intentions to participate at the 2008 contest on 9 July 2007. NRK has traditionally organised the national final Melodi Grand Prix to select its entry for the contest in all but one of its participation. Along with its participation confirmation, the broadcaster revealed details regarding its selection procedure and announced the organization of Melodi Grand Prix 2008 in order to select its 2008 entry.

== Before Eurovision ==
=== Melodi Grand Prix 2008 ===
Melodi Grand Prix 2008 was the 46th edition of the national final Melodi Grand Prix organised by NRK to select its entry for the Eurovision Song Contest 2008. 18 songs were selected to compete in a five-week-long process that commenced on 12 January 2008 and concluded with the final on 9 February 2008. All shows were hosted by Per Sundnes and televised on NRK1 as well as streamed online at NRK's official website nrk.no.

==== Format ====
The competition consisted of five shows: three semi-finals on 12, 19 and 26 January 2008, a Last Chance round (Sistesjansen) on 6 February 2008 and a final on 9 February 2008. Six songs competed in each semi-final and the top two entries directly qualified to the final. The entries that placed third and fourth proceeded to the Last Chance round, and the bottom two were eliminated from the competition. An additional two entries qualified to the final from the Last Chance round. The results of the semi-finals and Last Chance round were determined exclusively by public televoting, while the results in the final were determined by jury voting and public televoting. Viewers could vote through telephone and SMS, and for the semi-finals, the public was able to cast their votes in advance on the day before each show was broadcast.

==== Competing entries ====
A submission period was opened by NRK between 9 July 2007 and 1 September 2007. Songwriters of any nationality were allowed to submit entries, while performers of the selected songs would be chosen by NRK in consultation with the songwriters. In addition to the public call for submissions, NRK reserved the right to directly invite certain artists and composers to compete. At the close of the deadline, 600 submissions were received. 18 songs were selected for the competition and their titles were revealed on 13 December 2007. The six acts competing in each of the three semi-finals were revealed on 18 December 2007, 28 December 2007 and 4 January 2008, respectively.

Artist	Song	Songwriter(s)
Ann-Mari Andersen	"Ándagassii"	Stein Austrud, Ann-Mari Andersen
Anne Hvidsten	"A Little More"	Anne Hvidsten
Avalanche	"Two Monkeys (On the Roof)"	Kjetil Røsnes, Kirsti Johansen
Crash!	"Get Up"	Trond "Teeny" Holter
Cube	"Would You Spend the Night With Me?"	Åge Sten "Glam" Nilsen
King of Trolls	"Far Away"	Frode Anderssen
Lene Alexandra	"Sillycone Valley"	Ivar Winther, Kam An Leung
Maria Haukaas Storeng	"Hold On Be Strong"	Mira Craig
Maria Trøen	"Hear When I'm Calling"	Jarl Aanestad
Michelle	"Baby Don't Stop the Music"	Fred Ball, Hannah Robinson
Nicholas Carlie	"Colliding"	Nate Campany, Per Kristian Ottestad
Ole Ivars	"Som i himmelen"	William Kristoffersen
Podium	"Lystgass"	Tørje Lennavik, Håkan Fjerdingen
Sven Garås	"I'm in Love"	Robin Nordahl, Ingrid Nørsett
Tinkerbells	"Hold On"	Aina Beate Gundersen, Svein Gundersen, Jan Groth
Torstein Sødal	"Eastern Wind"	Christian Ingebrigtsen, Eivind Rølles
Veronica Akselsen	"Am I Supposed to Love Again?"	Anne Takle, Laila Samuelsen
Zuma	"Always, Always"	Alexander Stenerud

==== Semi-finals ====
Six songs competed in each of the three semi-finals that took place on 12, 18 and 26 January 2008. The first semi-final took place at the Sandvigå in Stavanger, the second semi-final took place at the Kongsvingerhallen in Kongsvinger, and the third semi-final took place at the Bodø Spektrum in Bodø. In each semi-final the top two directly qualified to the final, while the third and fourth placed songs proceeded to the Last Chance round. In addition to the performances of the competing entries, a past Norwegian Eurovision entrant was featured in each semi-final as the interval act: Kirstie Sparboe performed her 1969 entry "Oj, oj, oj, så glad jeg skal bli" in the first semi-final, Anne-Karine Strøm performed her 1976 entry "Mata Hari" in the second semi-final, and Ketil Stokkan performed his 1986 entry "Romeo" in the third semi-final.

Semi-final 1 – 12 January 2008
R/O	Artist	Song	Result
1	Podium	"Lystgass"	Last Chance
2	Ann-Mari Andersen	"Ándagassii"	Final
3	Nicholas Carlie	"Colliding"	—N/a
4	Michelle	"Baby Don't Stop the Music"	—N/a
5	Tinkerbells	"Hold On"	Last Chance
6	Veronica Akselsen	"Am I Supposed to Love Again?"	Final

Semi-final 2 – 18 January 2008
R/O	Artist	Song	Result
1	Zuma	"Always, Always"	Last Chance
2	Cube	"Would You Spend the Night With Me?"	—N/a
3	Anne Hvidsten	"A Little More"	Last Chance
4	Crash!	"Get Up"	Final
5	Sven Garås	"I'm in Love"	—N/a
6	Maria Haukaas Storeng	"Hold On Be Strong"	Final

Semi-final 3 – 26 January 2008
R/O	Artist	Song	Result
1	Avalanche	"Two Monkeys (On the Roof)"	—N/a
2	Maria Trøen	"Hear When I'm Calling"	—N/a
3	Ole Ivars	"Som i himmelen"	Last Chance
4	Lene Alexandra	"Sillycone Valley"	Last Chance
5	Torstein Sødal	"Eastern Wind"	Final
6	King of Trolls	"Far Away"	Final

==== Last Chance round ====
The Last Chance round took place on 6 February 2008 at the Oslo Stratos in Oslo. The six entries that placed third and fourth in the preceding three semi-finals competed and the top two entries qualified to the final. In addition to the performances of the competing entries, Guri Schanke (who represented Norway in 2007) appeared as a special guest.

Last Chance – 6 February 2008
R/O	Artist	Song	Result
1	Podium	"Lystgass"	—N/a
2	Tinkerbells	"Hold On"	Final
3	Zuma	"Always, Always"	—N/a
4	Anne Hvidsten	"A Little More"	—N/a
5	Ole Ivars	"Som i himmelen"	Final
6	Lene Alexandra	"Sillycone Valley"	—N/a

==== Final ====
Eight songs that qualified from the preceding three semi-finals and the Last Chance round competed during the final at the Oslo Spektrum in Oslo on 9 February 2008. The winner was selected over two rounds of voting. In the first round, public televoting selected the top four entries to proceed to the second round, the Gold Final. In the Gold Final, three regional juries from the three semi-final host cities each distributed points as follows: 2,000, 4,000, 6,000 and 10,000 points. The results of the public televote were then revealed by Norway's five regions and added to the jury scores, leading to the victory of "Hold On Be Strong" performed by Maria Haukaas Storeng with 195,661 votes. In addition to the performances of the competing entries, the interval acts featured Jahn Teigen (who represented Norway in 1978, 1982, and 1983), performing several of his past Melodi Grand Prix entries: "Optimist", "Mil etter mil", "Do Re Mi", and "Glasnost", and a Melodi Grand Prix medley performed by Guri Schanke (who represented Norway in 2007).

Final – 9 February 2008
R/O	Artist	Song	Result
1	Crash!	"Get Up"	—N/a
2	Ann-Mari Andersen	"Ándagassii"	—N/a
3	Tinkerbells	"Hold On"	—N/a
4	Veronica Akselsen	"Am I Supposed to Love Again?"	Gold Final
5	King of Trolls	"Far Away"	Gold Final
6	Ole Ivars	"Som i himmelen"	—N/a
7	Torstein Sødal	"Eastern Wind"	Gold Final
8	Maria Haukaas Storeng	"Hold On Be Strong"	Gold Final

Gold Final – 9 February 2008
R/O	Artist	Song	Jury	Televote	Total	Place
1	Veronica Akselsen	"Am I Supposed to Love Again?"	16,000	93,957	109,957	4
2	King of Trolls	"Far Away"	6,000	109,811	115,811	3
3	Torstein Sødal	"Eastern Wind"	18,000	100,095	118,095	2
4	Maria Haukaas Storeng	"Hold On Be Strong"	26,000	169,661	195,661	1

Detailed Regional Jury Votes
R/O	Song	Stavanger	Kongsvinger	Bodø	Total
1	"Am I Supposed to Love Again?"	4,000	6,000	6,000	16,000
2	"Far Away"	2,000	2,000	2,000	6,000
3	"Eastern Wind"	10,000	4,000	4,000	18,000
4	"Hold On Be Strong"	6,000	10,000	10,000	26,000
Spokespersons
Stavanger – Kirsti Sparboe; Kongsvinger – Anne-Karine Strøm; Bodø – Ketil Stokkan

Detailed Regional Televoting Results
R/O	Song	North	Central	West	East	South	Total
1	"Am I Supposed to Love Again?"	4,713	10,878	11,505	55,751	11,110	93,957
2	"Far Away"	7,520	14,627	15,043	58,797	13,824	109,811
3	"Eastern Wind"	5,391	10,423	15,308	46,226	22,747	100,095
4	"Hold On Be Strong"	22,056	23,396	21,169	83,342	19,698	169,661
Spokespersons
Northern Norway – Jenny Jenssen; Central Norway – Mona Grudt; Western Norway – Synnøve Skarbø; Eastern Norway – Linn Skåber; Southern Norway – Jorun Stiansen

==== Ratings ====
Viewing figures by show
Show	Date	Viewers (in millions)	Ref.
Semi-final 1	12 January 2008	0.765	
Semi-final 2	18 January 2008	0.711	
Semi-final 3	26 January 2008	0.75	
Last Chance	6 February 2008	0.468	
Final	9 February 2008	1.128	

=== Promotion ===
Maria Haukaas Storeng specifically promoted "Hold On Be Strong" as the Norwegian Eurovision entry on 25 April 2008 by performing during the UK Eurovision Preview Party, which was held at the Scala venue in London, United Kingdom and hosted by Paddy O'Connell.

In Norway, "Hold On Be Strong" reached number one on the VG-lista singles chart after winning Melodi Grand Prix 2008, and was the first Eurovision 2008 song to top the charts anywhere in Europe. Maria Haukaas Storeng later signed a record deal with Universal Music and released her latest album in Norway before competing at Eurovision in Belgrade.

== At Eurovision ==
It was announced in September 2007 that the competition's format would be expanded to two semi-finals in 2008. According to the rules, all nations with the exceptions of the host country and the "Big Four" (France, Germany, Spain, and the United Kingdom) are required to qualify from one of two semi-finals in order to compete for the final; the top nine songs from each semi-final as determined by televoting progress to the final, and a tenth was determined by back-up juries. The European Broadcasting Union (EBU) split up the competing countries into six different pots based on voting patterns from previous contests, with countries with favourable voting histories put into the same pot. On 28 January 2008, an allocation draw was held which placed each country into one of the two semi-finals. Norway was placed into the first semi-final, to be held on 20 May 2008. The running order for the semi-finals was decided through another draw on 17 March 2008 and Norway was set to perform in position 9, following the entry from Slovenia and before the entry from Poland.

In Norway, the first semi-final and the final were broadcast on NRK1, while the second semi-final was broadcast on NRK3. All shows featured commentary by Hanne Hoftun. NRK appointed Stian Barsnes-Simonsen as its spokesperson to announce the Norwegian votes during the final.

=== Semi-final ===
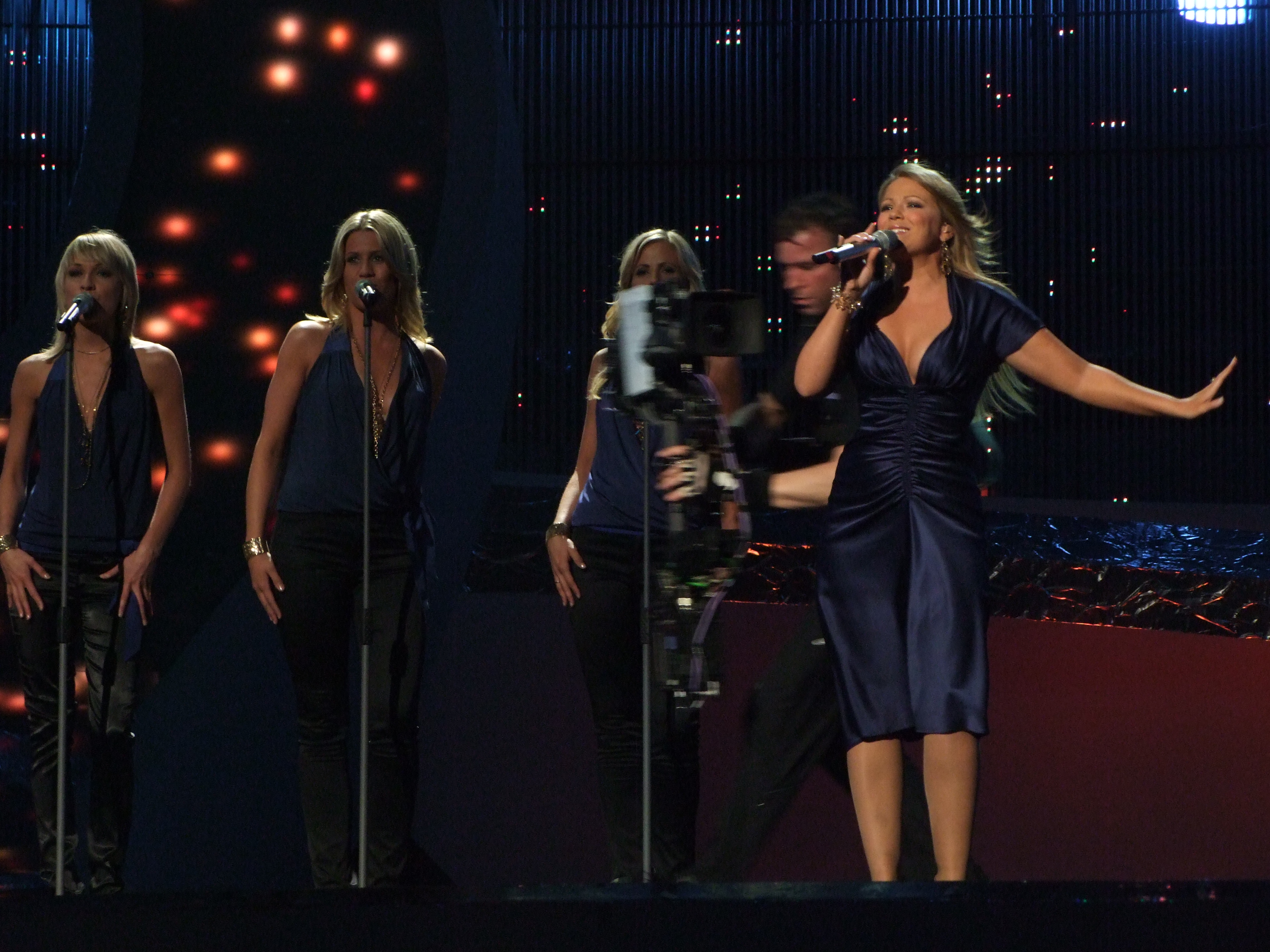
Maria Haukaas Storeng performing during the first semi-final

Maria Haukaas Storeng took part in technical rehearsals on 11 and 15 May, followed by dress rehearsals on 19 and 20 May. The Norwegian performance featured Maria Haukaas Storeng performing on stage in a mid-length blue dress together with five backing vocalists. The performance also featured minimalistic choreography integrated by Storeng to the song. The stage colours were predominantly blue and the LED screens displayed a starry background. The five backing vocalists on stage with Maria Haukaas Storeng were Håvard Gryting, Jorunn Hauge, Karianne Kjærnes, May Kristin Kaspersen and Øystein Nesbakken.

At the end of the show, Norway was announced as having finished in the top 10 and subsequently qualifying for the grand final. It was later revealed that Norway placed fourth in the semi-final, receiving a total of 106 points. The first semi-final was watched by 925,000 viewers in Norway, which represented an increase of 219,000 from the semi-final in 2007 when the nation failed to qualify.

=== Final ===
Shortly after the first semi-final, a winners' press conference was held for the 10 qualifying countries. As part of this press conference, the qualifying artists took part in a draw to determine the running order for the final. This draw was done in the order the countries were announced during the semi-final. Norway was drawn to perform last in position 25, following the entry from Russia.

Maria Haukaas Storeng once again took part in dress rehearsals on 23 and 24 May before the final. Maria Haukaas Storeng performed a repeat of her semi-final performance during the final on 24 May. At the conclusion of the voting, Norway finished in fifth place with 182 points. The final was watched by 1.553 million viewers in Norway with a market share of 82%. Viewership increased to almost 1.8 million during the voting.

=== Voting ===
Below is a breakdown of points awarded to Norway and awarded by Norway in the first semi-final and grand final of the contest. The nation awarded its 12 points to Bosnia and Herzegovina in the semi-final and to Denmark in the final of the contest.

==== Points awarded to Norway ====
Points awarded to Norway (Semi-final 1)
Score	Country
12 points	Finland
10 points	Andorra
8 points	Armenia; Estonia; Ireland
7 points	Azerbaijan; Poland; Russia; San Marino
6 points	Israel
5 points	Netherlands
4 points	Bosnia and Herzegovina; Montenegro; Romania
3 points	Moldova
2 points	Slovenia; Spain
1 point	Belgium; Germany

Points awarded to Norway (Final)
Score	Country
12 points	Finland; Sweden
10 points	Denmark; Iceland
8 points	Estonia; Poland
7 points	Albania; Armenia; Ireland; Israel; San Marino; United Kingdom
6 points	Latvia; Spain; Ukraine
5 points	Azerbaijan; Belarus; Georgia; Moldova; Romania; Russia
4 points	Hungary; Lithuania; Netherlands; Serbia
3 points	Malta
2 points	Belgium; Bosnia and Herzegovina; Greece; Portugal; Turkey
1 point	Andorra; Bulgaria; Croatia

==== Points awarded by Norway ====
Points awarded by Norway (Semi-final 1)
Score	Country
12 points	Bosnia and Herzegovina
10 points	Israel
8 points	Russia
7 points	Netherlands
6 points	Finland
5 points	Romania
4 points	Greece
3 points	Armenia
2 points	Poland
1 point	Ireland

Points awarded by Norway (Final)
Score	Country
12 points	Denmark
10 points	Bosnia and Herzegovina
8 points	Iceland
7 points	Sweden
6 points	Serbia
5 points	Russia
4 points	Finland
3 points	Israel
2 points	Turkey
1 point	France

== After Eurovision ==
Storeng returned to Norway after the final as a heroine, with much praise given to her after her fifth place in Belgrade. "Hold On Be Stong" was later released in Sweden after Eurovision, where it peaked on the Sverigetopplistan at #8. The song also reached #37 on the Danish singles chart.

In November 2008, Storeng performed in the musical Grease at the Oslo Spektrum, playing the character of Betty Rizzo. She becomes one of the many number of artists who have competed at Eurovision to go on to perform in Grease, with others including Sally-Ann Triplet, who represented the United Kingdom in 1980 and 1982, and Olivia Newton-John, who represented the United Kingdom in 1974 and became famous for acting in the film version of the musical.

After receiving such a strong placing from a Norwegian-composed song, NRK decided to close off Melodi Grand Prix to foreign composers, something which the broadcaster was once reluctant to do. Stian Malme, project manager for Melodi Grand Prix, said that NRK "wants the Melodi Grand Prix to be a forum where Norwegian songwriters can develop and present themselves both nationally as well as internationally." Storeng returned to Melodi Grand Prix in 2009, this time as co-host of the contest with Per Sundnes.

Despite hosting MGP, Storeng was rumoured to be one of the participants in the Swedish preselection for Eurovision 2009 Melodifestivalen. She was rumoured to be competing in the contest as a duet with another former Eurovision artist, Anna Sahlene, who represented Estonia in 2002 with "Runaway". Due to conflicting dates with her hosting duties with MGP, the only possible semi-final she could compete in was the final semi-final, held one week after the final of MGP 2009. This news was confirmed by Sveriges Television (SVT), with Storeng and Sahlene competing in the fourth semi-final, held on 28 February 2009, with the song "Killing Me Tenderly". The duo failed to qualify to the final of Melodifestivalen 2009, placing seventh in the semi-final.
