= Lene Alexandra =

- Also known as: Lene Alexandra, Miss Boobs
- Born: Lene Alexandra Øien; 29 October 1981 (age 44); Trøgstad, Norway
- Origin: Norway
- Genres: Electropop
- Occupations: Singer, model
- Years active: 2001–present
- Labels: C+C Records (2007–2009); Sony Music (2009–2012)
- Website: lenealexandra.com

Lene Alexandra Øien (born 29 October 1981 in Trøgstad, Norway) is a Norwegian singer, television personality and model.

== History and career ==
=== 2001–06: Career beginnings ===
Alexandra was a model for the FHM magazine as well for the Norwegian lad's mags Lek and Cats. At 19 she appeared on the Norwegian counterpart of popular show "Survivor". She made friends with the host who also has his own record label and offered to work at the label free without a salary as long as one day she might be able to make music with them.

=== 2007–08: Welcome To Sillycone Valley and ESC 2008 ===
After years of working at the record company, she began her musical career in 2007 at age 25 and released her first single entitled "My Boobs Are OK". The single charted in several European countries and broke the top 10 in Norway and Finland followed by her second single "Hot Boy, Hot Girl". In 2008, Alexandra released her debut album Welcome to Sillycone Valley and her third single "Sillycone Valley". She was an entrant in the Norwegian national selection for Eurovision Song Contest 2008, where she sang "Sillycone Valley". She made it to the second chance round where she ended up in 3rd place and missed a place in the finals. Alexandra's fourth and final single "Sexy, Naughty, Bitchy Me" from her debut album was originally recorded by Thai pop singer Tata Young titled "Sexy Naughty Bitchy" on her first English album I Believe. In November 2008 Alexandra won the fourth season of Skal vi danse?, the Norwegian version of Dancing with the Stars.

=== 2009–11: ESC 2010 and other ventures ===
She is now signed for Sony Music. She entered the national selection for Eurovision Song Contest 2010 with the song "Prima Donna" which ended up in one of the bottom two positions in the semi-final. In 2011, she is educated as personal trainer, and works for SATS in Storo. A new album was set for a release in autumn 2011.

=== 2012–present: Try to Catch Me ===
In 2012, Alexandra is releasing a 5-track EP album called Try to Catch Me in which she uses more of a jazz sound rather than her previous dance/pop sound. The first single of the EP is the song of the same name.

Since 2012, she has silently retired from music, focusing on her career as a fitness coach and influencer.

== Personal life ==
Alexandra speaks Norwegian as well as English and Swedish. She has done promotions in both Norwegian and English.

She and another woman claimed that they had sex with Robbie Williams, which she later has admitted was a lie. In 2005, Williams said about the two women, "You two are big liars. You are fine, and I would have slept with you." ["Dere to er store løgnere. Dere er flotte, og jeg ville ha ligget med dere"].

In 2013, she revealed that when she worked as a stripper, she had a habit of using amphetamine before she started her shifts.

She previously she was content to be single and was not wanting any children for many years. In June 2025, Alexandra stated during an interview on the Mr.Modig podcast, that she had a son, her first child, via surrogate in 2024.

== Discography ==
=== Albums ===
- 2008: Welcome to Sillycone Valley
- 2012: Try to Catch Me (EP)

=== Singles ===
- 2007: "My Boobs Are OK" No. 3 NOR
- 2007: "Hot Boy, Hot Girl" No. 12 NOR
- 2008: "Sillycone Valley" No. 17 NOR
- 2008: "Sexy, Naughty, Bitchy Me" (Tata Young Cover)
- 2010: "Prima Donna"
- 2012: "Try to Catch Me"

== Filmography ==
- 2001: Survivor (as herself)
- 2008: Skal vi danse? (as herself)
