= Maria Haukaas Mittet =

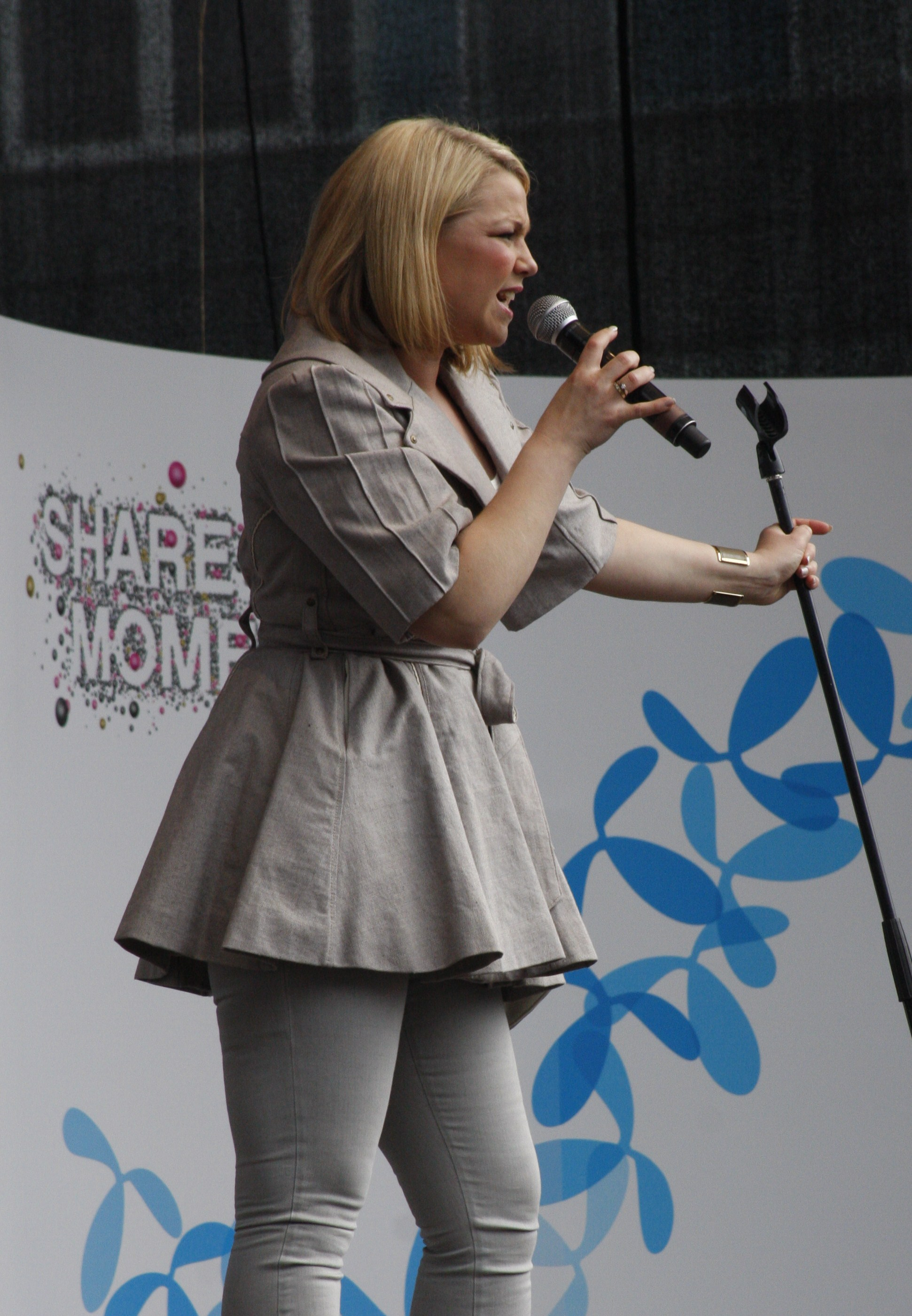

Background information
- Born: Maria Haukaas Storeng; 3 August 1979 (age 47)
- Origin: Finnsnes, Troms, Norway
- Occupations: Singer, actress
- Years active: 1991–present
- Labels: Oslo Recordings/Bonnier, Universal
- Website: www.mariahaukaasstoreng.com

Maria Haukaas Mittet (née Storeng, born 3 August 1979) also known as simply Maria is a Norwegian recording artist. She gained national recognition in 2004 for her participation in the Idol reality television series, and international recognition in 2008 as Norway's representative in the 53rd Eurovision Song Contest.

== Biography ==
Maria was born in Finnsnes, but grew up on the island of Senja, in Troms county, Norway. She first received national media attention when she had her first musical role at the age of 11, with the lead in Annie, at the Bryggeteateret in Oslo (1991). Maria and her family moved to Oslo for the musical, and when the show run was over, they moved back to Senja.

She has since performed in several musicals, both in the capital Oslo, and in the county Troms where she grew up.

At the age of 24, she was part of Idol (Norway) in 2004, where she finished 6th. She took part in the Idol Tour 2004, along with other contestants in the top ten.

She released her debut solo album in 2005, which peaked at number 13 on the Norwegian album charts. The single "Breathing" peaked at number 5 and was certified Gold in Norway, while "Should've" peaked at number 20. She went on a four-month national tour to promote the album. "Should've" has the same chord structure as the Rolling Stones song "Beast of Burden" from their album Some Girls.

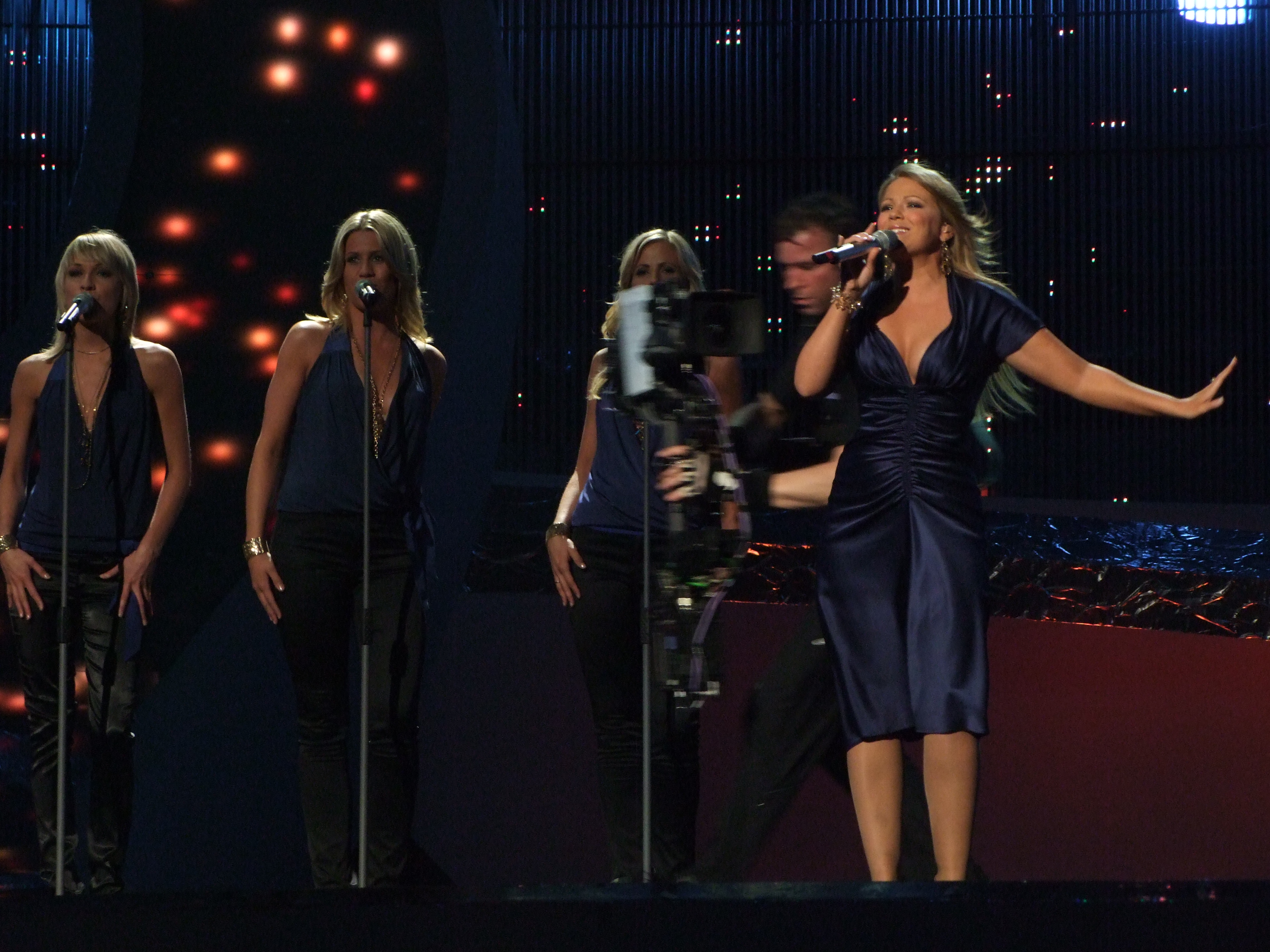
Maria Haukaas Storeng performing "Hold On Be Strong" at the first Eurovision Song Contest 2008 semi-final.

Maria is the Norwegian representative to perform in the Eurovision Song Contest 2008 with the song "Hold On Be Strong", written by Mira Craig. On 12 February 2008 the song entered the Norwegian single charts at number 5, reaching number 1 on 19 February 2008.

Maria released her second studio album, Hold On Be Strong, on 28 April 2008 with help from Mira Craig.

=== Eurovision Song Contest 2008 ===
'Hold On Be Strong' (2008)
The Norwegian artist Mira Craig wrote the song "Hold On Be Strong" when she was 15 years old.

Maria entered the qualifying rounds of the Melodi Grand Prix 2008 on 18 January and was voted through directly to the national final. In the final on 9 February, she received the highest number of votes from both the televoting and the jury, which made her the Norwegian representative in the Eurovision Song Contest 2008, which was held in Belgrade, Serbia. The song finished fourth in the first semi-final and qualified for the final, which took place on 24 May. Maria and the song did very well in the final, ending up in fifth place.

=== Eurovision Song Contest 2009 ===
Maria was a co-host (together with Per Sundnes) of Melodi Grand Prix 2009, in which Alexander Rybak was selected as Norway's entry in the Eurovision Song Contest 2009.

Maria also participated in the Swedish Melodifestivalen 2009, singing "Killing Me Tenderly", with Anna Sahlene. They competed against seven other contestants in the fourth heat, in Malmö on 28 February 2009, and placed seventh out of eight acts.

=== Eurovision Song Contest 2010 ===
On 4 December 2009 it was officially announced that Maria would participate in the Melodi Grand Prix 2010 the national contest which will decide the Norwegian entry for the Eurovision Song Contest 2010 to be held in Oslo after last year's Alexander Rybak victory. Maria's song is called "Make My Day" and is written by Merethe La Verdi and Mats Lie Skåre and is described as mid-tempo. On 8 January, the first heat of the Melodi Grand Prix 2010 was held in Orland and Maria won the semi and advanced to the Final in Oslo, where she did not come in the top four.

=== FIS Nordic World Ski Championships 2011 ===
Maria performed the official theme song "Glorious" for the FIS Nordic World Ski Championships 2011 in Oslo, Norway.

== Theatre (selected) ==
- 1991–1992 Annie – as Annie (at Bryggeteateret in Oslo)
- 1995–1996 Trollmannen fra Oz (en. The Wizard of Oz) – as Dorothy (at Det norske teatret in Oslo)
- 2002 Thank You for the Music – ABBA Tribute (at Scene West in Oslo)
- 2003 Fame – as Mabel Washington (at Chat Noir in Oslo)
- 2005 Hamlet – as Ophelia (by Nordnorsk Scenekompani in Harstad and Tromsø)
- 2006–2007 Hair – as Sheila Franklin (at Det Norske Teatret in Oslo)

== Discography ==
Maria Haukaas Storeng discography
- Studio albums: 3
- Singles: 7
- Music videos: 2
- Collaborations: 3

The following article is a discography of albums and singles released by Norwegian artist Maria Haukaas Storeng.

=== Albums ===
Year	Information	Chart positions		Sales/Certification
Year	Information	NO	SE	Sales/Certification
2005	Breathing: First studio album; Released: 31 January 2005	13	—	NO sales: 15,000; NO certification: Gold
2008	Hold On Be Strong: Second studio album; Released: 28 April 2008	3	53	NO sales: 19,000; NO certification: Gold
2010	Make My Day: Third studio album; Released: 14 June 2010	39	—	NO sales: TBA; NO certification: TBA
2011	Lys imot mørketida with Oslo Gospel Choir: Fourth studio album; Released: 18 November 2010	2	—	NO certification: TBA
2014	Heim: Fifth studio album; Released: 2014	30	—	

=== Singles ===
Year	Title	Chart positions			Album
Year	Title	NO	SE	DK	Album
2004	"Breathing"	5	—	—	Breathing
2005	"Should've"	20	—	—	Breathing
2006	"Nobody Knows"	—	—	—	non-album single
2008	"Hold On Be Strong"	1	8	37	Hold On Be Strong
2008	"Mine All Mine" (feat. Mira Craig)	—	—	—	Hold On Be Strong
2008	"Lazy"	—	—	—	Hold On Be Strong
2009	"Killing Me Tenderly" (with Sahlene)	—	10	—	non-album single
2010	"Make My Day"	14	—	—	Make My Day
2010	"Precious to Me" (feat. Måns Zelmerlöw)	—	—	—	Make My Day
2011	"Glorious"	7	—	—	TBA

=== Featured-on albums ===
- 1991 "Annie" – den norske suksessversjonen
- 2004 Idol – de 11 finalistene – track 3, "Don't Give a Damn" – (Album charts: number 2)
- 2008 Melodi Grand Prix 2008 (Album charts: number 28)
- 2009 Melodifestivalen 2009
- 2010 Melodi Grand Prix 2010

== Filmography ==
- Kim Possible (TV) (Norwegian audio version) – sings the theme song – sings a ballad in one episode
- Chicken Little (Norwegian audio version) – sings "Ta Den Ut"
- Shrek the Third (Norwegian audio version) – Rapunsel (voice)

Self

- 1999 Beat for Beat (TV) (Norwegian music show)
- 2001 Du skal høre mye (TV)
- 2003 Beat for Beat (TV)
- 2004 Idol (TV)
- 2004 Beat for Beat (TV)
- 2005 Heia Tufte (TV)
- 2007 Beat for Beat (TV)
- 2008 Beat for Beat (TV)

== See also ==
- Norway in the Eurovision Song Contest

Preceded by Guri Schanke with "Ven a bailar conmigo"	Norway in the Eurovision Song Contest; 2008	Succeeded by Alexander Rybak with "Fairytale"
