= Bjørn Johan Muri =

Norwegian singer (born 1990)

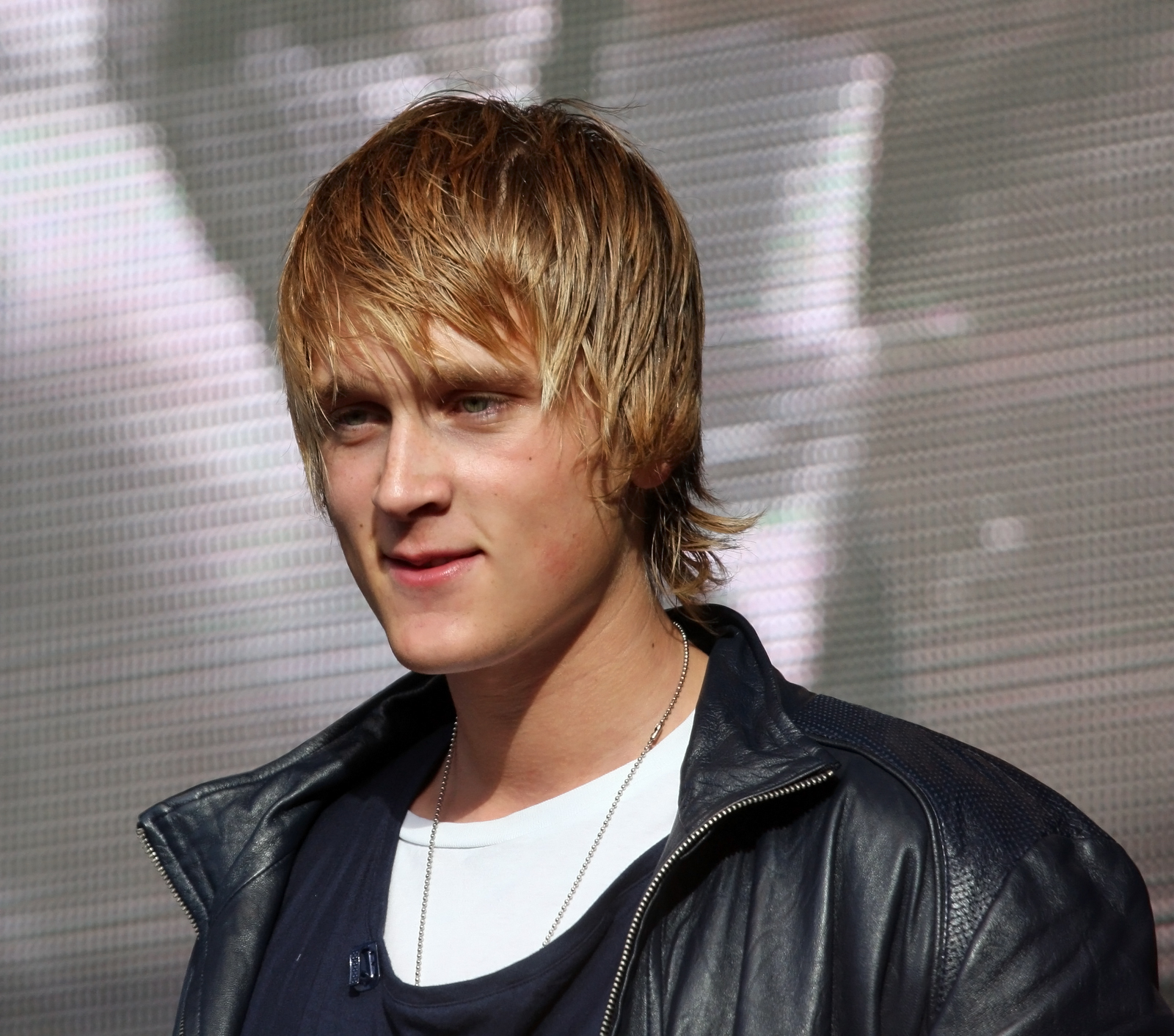

Background information
- Born: 4 January 1990 (age 36)
- Origin: Ålesund, Norway
- Genres: Pop
- Occupation: Singer-songwriter
- Years active: 2007–present
- Label: Universal Music

Bjørn Johan Muri (born 4 January 1990) is a Norwegian singer known for having taken part in Series 5 Idol (the Norwegian Pop Idol) in 2007 where he came runner-up.

In 2010, he took part in the Norwegian qualification for the Eurovision Song Contest 2010, with the song "Yes Man". Here he qualified for the final, where he finished fourth overall. Despite that, the single still became a #1 hit in Norway.

Muri also plays drums in a brass band, and sings in a jazz band called "Little Green Apples Falling Down From A Tree". He also sings the Norwegian version of "This Is Me" in the Disney film Camp Rock.

== Discography ==
=== Album ===
Airwaves (2010)

1. Once Upon A Time (Feat. Lidolido)
2. Yes Man
3. Iron Love
4. Circles
5. Nothing Is For Real
6. Nobody Knows (Feat. Kelly Mueller)
7. The One That Got Away
8. Talking in My Sleep
9. Lights
10. The Beauty Of Who You Are

=== Singles ===
- 2009: "The Beauty of Who You Are"
- 2010: "Yes Man" NOR# 1, DEN No. 30
- 2010: "Circles"
- 2011: "Nobody Knows (ft. Kelly Mueller)"
- 2013: "I Was Somewhere"
