= Mira Craig =

Norwegian singer-songwriter

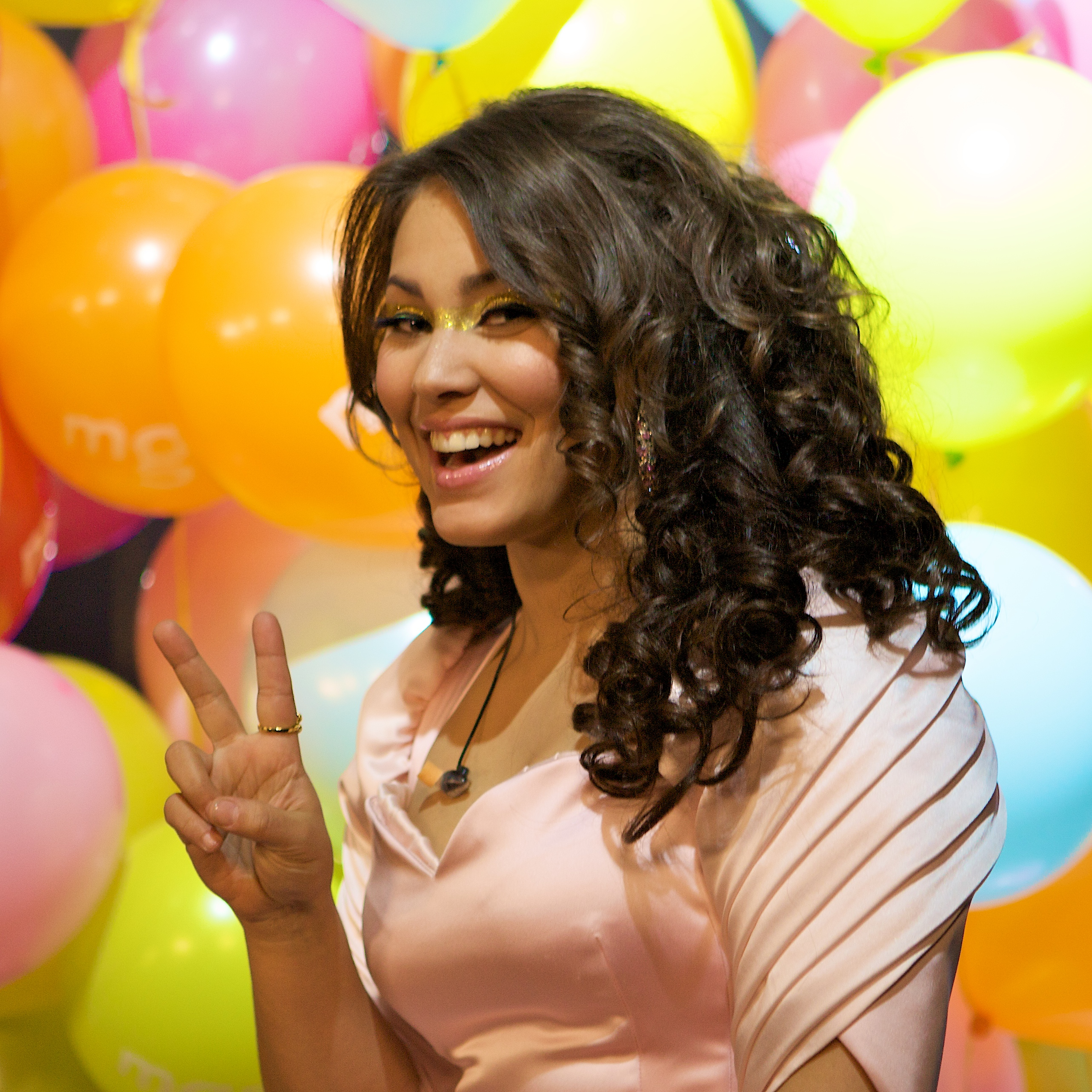
- Mira Craig in 2010.

Background information
- Also known as: Mira
- Born: Mira Scherdin Craig; 31 July 1982 (age 43)
- Origin: Oslo, Norway
- Genres: R&B/Hip Hop
- Occupations: Singer, songwriter
- Instruments: Singing, Composing
- Years active: 2005–present
- Labels: Home made Records, Doggystyle Records / EMI
- Website: www.miracraig.com

Mira Scherdin Craig (born 31 July 1982) is a Norwegian R&B artist.

== Early life ==
Craig's father is Ronaldo Craig, an African American from Baton Rouge, Louisiana. She was born in 1982 in Oslo, and at the age of twelve, Craig performed the Whitney Houston hit "I Wanna Dance with Somebody (Who Loves Me)" on the Norwegian youth TV show Midt i smørøyet. By the age of 15, she had started writing her own songs, and by 17, she was singing backup vocals for Noora Noor.

== Career ==
In 2000, she made headlines at "Quartfestivalen", a Norwegian music festival, when Wyclef Jean pulled her up on stage. American rap artist Snoop Dogg also took interest in her in 2005 at the same festival, and has since used one of her songs on his compilation Welcome to tha Chuuch: Da Album.

On 21 January 2006, Craig won the Newcomer of the Year award at "Alarm-prisen," a Norwegian music awards show. The same year, readers of Norwegian publication Mann Magazine voted her "Female of the Year".

In 2008, she took part in the Norwegian Melodi Grand Prix as a composer. She had written the song "Hold On Be Strong", which was performed by Maria Haukaas Storeng. The song won the right to represent Norway in Belgrade, and at the Eurovision semi-final on 20 May 2008. It finished fourth out of 19, earning a place in the Eurovision final, which took place on 24 May. The song ended in fifth place in the final with 182 points, and Norway got the highest ranking of all the countries in Western Europe.

In 2012, she released the lead single from her forthcoming fourth album. The song "Aces High" showed a more rock-oriented direction to her music. The song, however, has not reached the same level of success as her previous singles.

On 10 January 2022, it was announced that Craig would take part in Melodi Grand Prix 2022 with the song "We Still Here".

== Discography ==
=== Albums ===
Year	Title	Chart positions	Sales
Year	Title	NO	Sales
2006	Mira Mira	4	25,000
2007	Tribal Dreams	12	12,000
2009	Ghetto Fairytale	32	2,000
2014	See the Light		

=== Singles ===
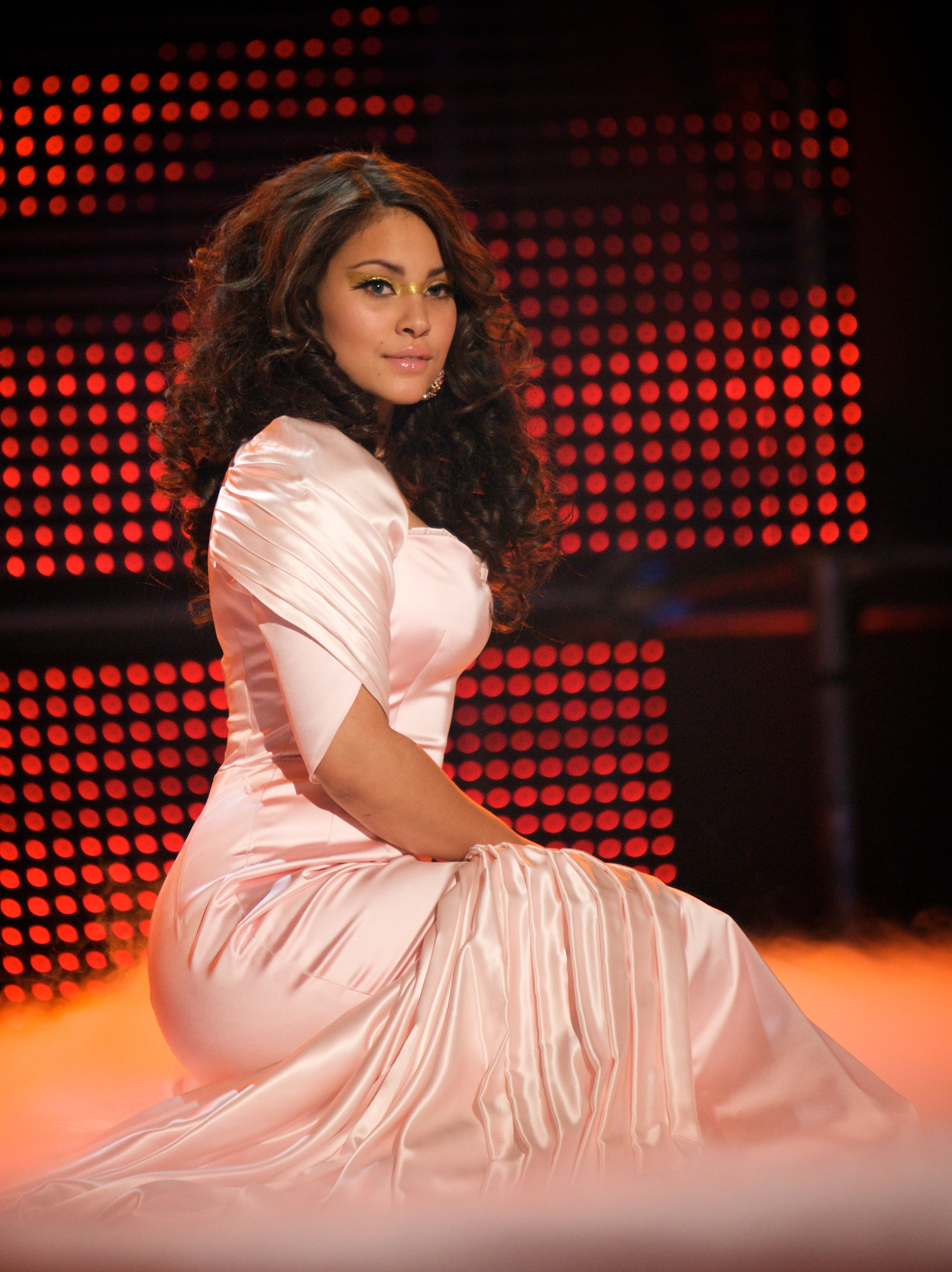
Mira Craig at Melodi Grand Prix 2010

Year	Title	Chart positions	Album
Year	Title	NO	Album
2005	"Boogeyman"	6	Mira Mira
2005	"Headhunted"	12	Mira Mira
2006	"Who Make Yuh"	—	Mira Mira
2007	"Leo"	13	Tribal Dreams
2007	"Fatty Girl"	—	Tribal Dreams
2009	"I'm the One"	—	Ghetto Fairytale
2010	"I'll Take You High"	—	n/a
2012	"Dead or Alive"	—	n/a
2012	"Aces High"	—	n/a
2012	"Love or Hate"	—	n/a
2014	"Muse Me"	—	n/a
2014	"Fill Yourself With Love"	—	n/a
2014	"Black Sheep"	—	n/a
2016	"The Hunt"	—	n/a
2016	"Muse Me"	—	n/a
2017	"O2"	—	n/a
2017	"All I Hear"	—	n/a
2017	"001"	—	n/a
2018	"Eclipse"	—	n/a
2018	"Lovewarriors"	—	n/a
2018	"So Alive"	—	n/a

=== Guest singles ===
Year	Title	Chart positions	Album
Year	Title	NO	Album
2008	"Mine All Mine" (with Maria Haukaas Storeng)	—	Hold On Be Strong

=== Other collaborations ===
- Bigg Snoop Dogg Presents…Welcome to tha Chuuch: Da Album

"Sisters N Brothers" – J. Black featuring Mira Craig, Snoop Dogg
"Dinner in Bed" – Mira Craig

- Timbaland Presents Shock Value

"Come and Get Me" (featuring 50 Cent, Tony Yayo and Mira Craig) (Timbaland, co-produced by Danja)

- Hold On Be Strong

"Hold On Be Strong" – Maria Haukaas Storeng (Music and lyrics by Mira Craig)
"Mine All Mine" – Maria Haukaas Storeng ft. Mira Craig

- Fighter Girl promo single

"Fighter Girl" – Mira Craig & Samsaya, featuring Elvira Nikolaisen, Bertine Zetlitz, Elisabeth Carew, Ida Maria, Maria Mena & Sichelle
