= Surferosa =

Norwegian Rock Band

Surferosa is a rock band from Norway formed in 2000, known for its distinct costumes and trashy electrified pop music. The band's musical style is primarily rock with punk/new wave and dance music influences and has been labeled "thrash pop". Most songs make integrated use of synthesizers, and Mariann provides a spunky vocal lead. The group is often compared to New Wave acts such as Blondie.

Hailing from Bø in Telemark, Surferosa became popular in Norway after winning a tour and studio recording in a band contest called So What. It has received several positive critical reviews. Surferosa has completed tours in Asia, America, the United Kingdom and Scandinavia. It also made the soundtrack for the movie Bare Bea. The group's song Royal Uniform from the album The Force was used on the soundtrack for the computer/video game FIFA 07 released by EA Sports. The song has also been released as a downloadable track for Singstar on the PlayStation 3. Scandinavian Decay, another song of theirs, was also used as a song in the Sims 2.

The name Surferosa is taken from a record by the Pixies.

In December 2009, Surferosa announced on their Myspace blog that they are taking a break from performing and recording, and have not made any further announcement since.

== Members ==
- Mariann Thomassen, vocals and keytar
- Andreas "Andy" Orheim, synthesizer
- Henrik Gustavsen, drums
- Kjetil Wevling, guitar
- Sigurd "Ziggy" Løvik, bass guitar
- Jan Roger Sletta (drums 1999-2007)

== Gallery ==
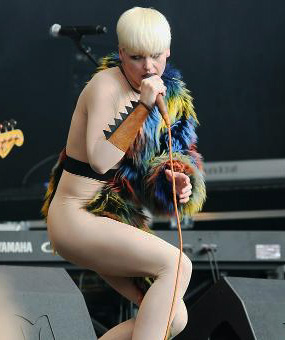
Mariann Thomassen, lead singer in Norwegian band Surferosa

== Discography ==
- To Russia with Love (EP; 2002)
- Neon Kommando (EP; 2002)
- Shanghai My Heart (album; March 2003)
- Neon Commando (EP, UK issue w/different track list; October 2003)
- "Lucky Lipstick" (single; 2003)
- "Olympia" (single, promo only; 2003)
- "Saturday Night" (single; January 2004)
- "Satin Con Blonde" (single, promo only; October 2004)
- "Royal Uniform" (single, promo only; 2005)
- The Force (album; September 2005)
- The Beat On The Street (album; April 2008)
- "In The Dead Of The Night"(single; June 2025)
