= Hold On Be Strong =

2008 song by Maria Haukaas Storeng

Single by Maria

from the album Hold On Be Strong
- A-side: "Hold On Be Strong"
- B-side: "Hold On Be Strong" (DeepFrost Cafémix Radio Edit); "Hold On Be Strong" (DeepFrost Cafémix)
- Released: February 2008 (digital download); April 21, 2008 (CD-single)
- Genre: R&B
- Length: 3:04
- Label: Universal Music
- Songwriter: Mira Craig
- Producer: Simen Eriksrud

Maria singles chronology
"Nobody Knows" (2006)	"Hold On Be Strong" (00000002)	"Make My Day" (2010)

Eurovision Song Contest 2008 entry
- Country: Norway
- Artist: Maria Haukaas Storeng
- As: Maria
- Language: English
- Composer: Mira Craig
- Lyricist: Mira Craig

Finals performance
- Semi-final result: 4th
- Semi-final points: 106
- Final result: 5th
- Final points: 182

Entry chronology
- ◄ "Ven a bailar conmigo" (2007)
- "Fairytale" (2009) ►

"Hold On Be Strong" is a song performed by Norwegian singer Maria Haukaas Storeng, written by Mira Craig. It was presented by Norway in the Eurovision Song Contest 2008 in Belgrade, Serbia.

== Eurovision Song Contest ==
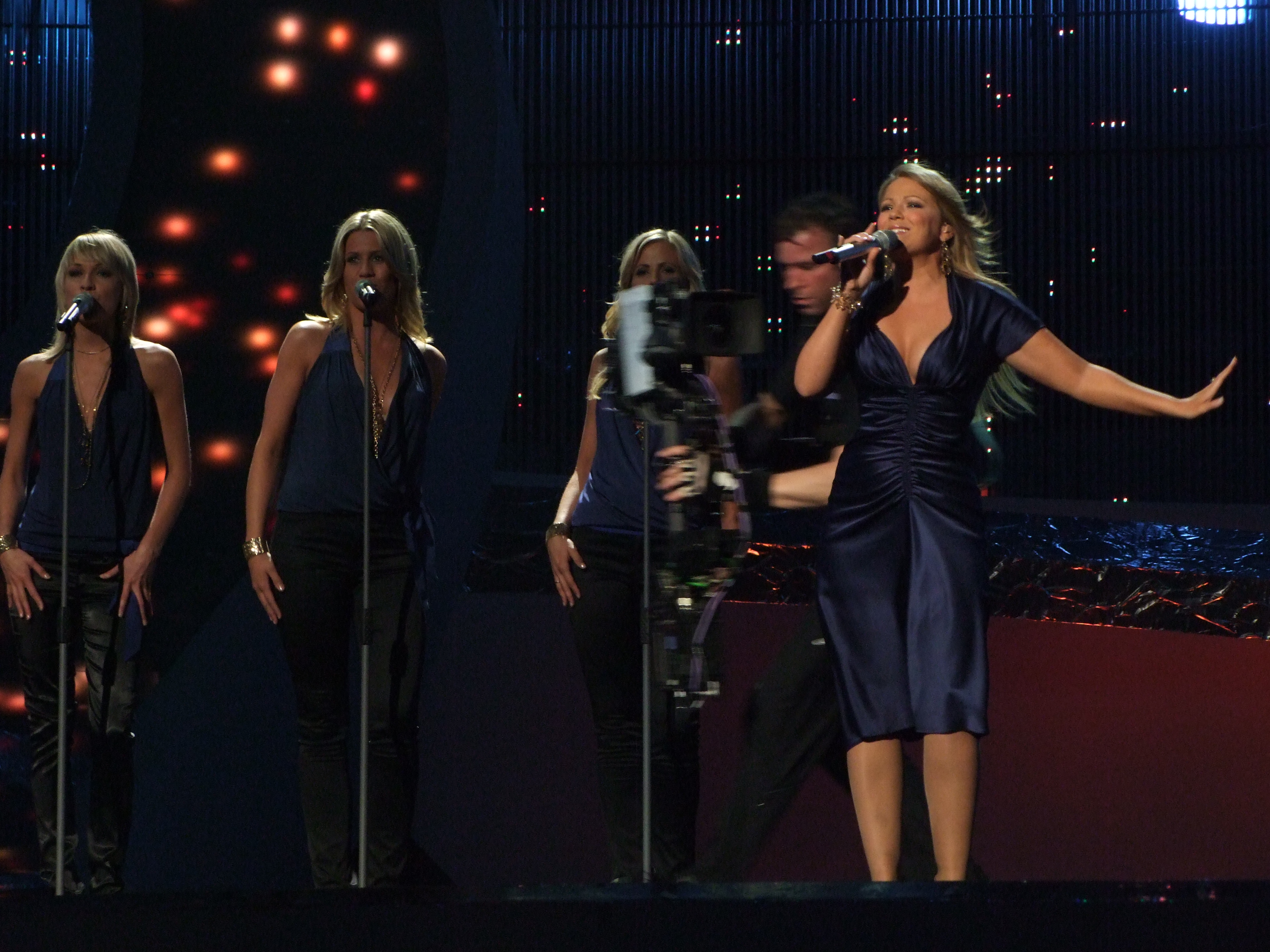
Storeng performing at the Eurovision Song Contest 2008 semi-final.

The song was elected through the Melodi Grand Prix 2008 on February 9, where she received the highest number of votes from both the televoting and the jury, with 77,566 votes more than the runner up.

On 20 May 2008 Storeng performed the song in the first semi-final of Eurovision, and won a place in the final. It was the last song performed on the night before the voting began. It finished in 5th place with a total of 182 points, thus being the highest ranking Western European song of the year.

The backing singers for the Eurovision performance were Jorunn Hauge, May Kristin Kaspersen, Kariane Kjærnes, Håvard Gryting and Øystein Nesbakken. The song is written by singer and songwriter Mira Craig. Mira and Maria are singing a duet on Maria's 2008 album Hold On Be Strong.

== Track listing ==
1. "Hold On Be Strong" – 3:04
2. "Hold On Be Strong" (DeepFrost Cafémix Radio Edit) – 3:00
3. "Hold On Be Strong" (DeepFrost Cafémix) – 3:41

== Charts ==
=== Weekly charts ===
Chart (2008)	Peak position
Denmark (Tracklisten)	37
Norway (VG-lista)	1
Sweden (Sverigetopplistan)	8

=== Year-end charts ===
Chart (2008)	Position
Sweden (Sverigetopplistan)	57
