= Dreamer (Soraya Arnelas album) =

Album of Spanish singer Soraya Arnelas

Studio album by Soraya Arnelas
- Released: September 27, 2010
- Recorded: 2010
- Genres: Dance; pop; electropop; Europop
- Length: 41:07
- Label: Sony Music Entertainment
- Producers: Soraya Arnelas; Juan Magan; Antoine Clamaran; TeeandGee; Toni Ten; Brian Cross

Soraya Arnelas chronology
Sin Miedo (2008)	Dreamer (2010)

Singles from Dreamer
- 1. "Live Your Dreams" Released: March 22, 2009; 2. "Dreamer" Released: February 7, 2011

Dreamer is the fifth album by Spanish singer Soraya Arnelas released in Spain on September 27, 2010, by Sony Music. It was her first album for the label and took six months to complete. Musically, it incorporates elements of Europop.

== Track listing ==
No.	Title	Writer(s)	Length
1.	"Dreamer"	Paul Brandoli	3:30
2.	"Failing Me (Runaway)"	Steve Robson, Lucie Silvas	3:13
3.	"Give You Up"	Lisa Rose, Juan Magan	3:09
4.	"Ticking All The Boxes"	Sam McCarthy	3:40
5.	"I Got You"	Dionisio Gómez Verdú	3:33
6.	"You've Got The Music"	Jordi Garrido, Iván Torrent	3:43
7.	"Electric Girl"	Serhat Bedük	3:03
8.	"Twilight"	Hanne Sørvaag	3:57
9.	"Live Your Dreams" (Feat. Antoine Clamaran)	Duane Harden, Antoine Clamaran	3:21
10.	"In My Blood"	Thomas J. Heyerdahl	3:08
11.	"Close To Me"	Ángel David López Álvarez	7:11

== Charts ==
Dreamer spent a total of 19 weeks on albums chart in Spain, peaking at number eight from sales in its first week of release.

Chart (2010)	Peak position
Spanish Album Chart	8
