= Bøksle =

Bøksle is a surname. Notable people with the surname include:

- Helene Bøksle (born 1981), Norwegian singer and actress
- Ivar Bøksle (1947–2025), Norwegian singer and accordionist
