= Spain in the Eurovision Song Contest 2008 =

- Eurovision Song Contest 2008
- Participating broadcaster: Radiotelevisión Española (RTVE)
- Country: Spain
- Selection process: Salvemos Eurovisión
- Selection date: 8 March 2008

Competing entry
- Song: "Baila el Chiki-chiki"
- Artist: Rodolfo Chikilicuatre
- Songwriters: Rodolfo Chikilicuatre and Friends

Placement
- Final result: 16th, 55 points

Participation chronology

Spain was represented at the Eurovision Song Contest 2008 with the song "Baila el Chiki-chiki" written by Rodolfo Chikilicuatre and Friends, and performed by Rodolfo Chikilicuatre himself. The Spanish participating broadcaster, Radiotelevisión Española (RTVE), organised the national final Salvemos Eurovisión in order to select its entry for the contest. Ten artists and songs competed in the televised show where a public televote selected "Baila el Chiki-chiki" performed by Rodolfo Chikilicuatre as the winner.

As a member of the "Big Four", Spain automatically qualified to compete in the final of the Eurovision Song Contest. Performing in position 22, Spain placed sixteenth out of the 25 participating countries with 55 points.

== Background ==
Prior to the 2008 contest, Televisión Española (TVE) until 2006, and Radiotelevisión Española (RTVE) in 2007, had participated in the Eurovision Song Contest representing Spain forty-seven times since TVE's first entry in 1961. They have won the contest on two occasions: in 1968 with the song "La, la, la" performed by Massiel and in 1969 with the song "Vivo cantando" performed by Salomé, the latter having won in a four-way tie with France, the Netherlands, and the United Kingdom. They have also finished second four times, with "En un mundo nuevo" by Karina in 1971, "Eres tú" by Mocedades in 1973, "Su canción" by Betty Missiego in 1979, and "Vuelve conmigo" by Anabel Conde in 1995. In 2007, RTVE placed twentieth with the song "I Love You Mi Vida" performed by D'Nash.

As part of its duties as participating broadcaster, RTVE organises the selection of its entry in the Eurovision Song Contest and broadcasts the event in the country. RTVE confirmed its intentions to participate at the 2008 contest on 14 August 2007. In 2006, TVE selected both the artist and song that would compete at the Eurovision Song Contest via an internal selection. In 2007, RTVE organised a national final featuring a competition among several artists and songs to select both the artist and song that would represent Spain, a procedure which was continued for its 2008 entry.

== Before Eurovision ==
=== Salvemos Eurovisión ===
Salvemos Eurovisión was the national final organised by RTVE that took place on 8 March 2008 at its Estudios Buñuel in Madrid, hosted by Raffaella Carrà. The show was broadcast on La 1, TVE Internacional, as well as online via RTVE's official website rtve.es. Ten artists and songs competed with the winner being decided upon through public televoting. The national final was watched by 1.96 million viewers in Spain with a market share of 16%.

==== Competing entries ====
A submission period was open from 22 January 2008 until 13 February 2008 for artists to upload their entries through the Salvemos Eurovisión MySpace platform. At the conclusion of the submission period, 536 entries were received. Internet users had between 16 February and 25 February 2008 to distribute five votes for their favourite entries per day via the platform and the top five entries that qualified for the national final were announced on 26 February 2008. A five-member committee consisting of Daniel Rodríguez Villasante (director of TVE music programmes), Mauro Canut (musician, editor and deputy director at the digital branch of RTVE), Borja Prieto (content director of MySpace Spain), Fernando Montesinos (music producer) and Toñi Prieto (executive producer of TVE music programmes) evaluated the remaining entries and selected an additional five entries for the national final, which were announced on 28 February 2008. "Mourning" performed by Null System was disqualified from the national final on the same day due to the song having been commercially released before 1 October 2007 and replaced with the song "Piensa gay" performed by Lorena C.

Artist	Song	Songwriter(s)	Votes	Place	Selection
Arkaitz	"Un olé"	Alejandro de Pinedo; Gema Castaño	63,460	3	Internet vote
Bizarre	"Si pudiera"	Bizarre	54,842	5	Internet vote
Coral	"Todo está en tu mente"	Tony Sánchez-Ohlsson; Thomas G:son; Andreas Rickstrand	58,339	4	Internet vote
D-Vine	"I Do You"	Sergio Bermejo	1,434	153	Committee
Ell*as	"100 x 100"	Jesús María Pérez; Amaya Martínez	1,533	142	Committee
Innata	"Me encanta bailar"	Joakim Hillson; Steffan Rundquist; Xavier Carreras	2,827	97	Committee
La Casa Azul	"La revolución sexual"	Guille Milkyway	67,706	2	Internet vote
Lorena C	"Piensa gay"	Carlos García Bayona; Juan de Dios Martín; Lorena Castell; Luis Troquel	2,423	106	Committee
Marzok Mangui	"Caramelo"	Marzok Mohamed	87	416	Committee
~~Null System~~	~~"Mourning"~~	Carlos Escobedo; Alberto Seara	~~3,226~~	~~86~~	Committee
Rodolfo Chikilicuatre	"Baila el Chiki-chiki"	Rodolfo Chikilicuatre and Friends	109,995	1	Internet vote

==== Final ====
The televised final took place on 8 March 2008. The running order for the ten participating entries was announced on 4 March 2008. The winner, "Baila el Chiki-chiki" performed by Rodolfo Chikilicuatre, was selected exclusively by a public televote through the combination of votes cast before the show starting from 4 March (20%) and votes cast during the show (80%). "Baila el Chiki-chiki" received 56% of the total votes.

The five members of the expert panel that commented on the entries were:

- José Luis Uribarri – television presenter and director, commentator of the Eurovision Song Contest for Spain
- Bibiana Fernández – actress
- Mauro Canut – musician, editor and deputy director at the digital branch of RTVE
- Boris Izaguirre – television personality
- Rosa López – singer, represented Spain in 2002

In addition to the performances of the competing entries, guest performers included La Pajarraca, Muchachada Nui and the show host Raffaella Carrà.

Salvemos Eurovisión – 8 March 2008
R/O	Artist	Song	Televote			Place
R/O	Artist	Song	Before Show	During Show	Total	Place
1	Bizarre	"Si pudiera"	6	16	22	7
2	Innata	"Me encanta bailar"	3	12	15	8
3	Arkaitz	"Un olé"	4	28	32	4
4	Ell*as	"100 x 100"	5	4	9	9
5	Lorena C	"Piensa gay"	2	20	22	6
6	D-Vine	"I Do You"	1	8	9	10
7	Rodolfo Chikilicuatre	"Baila el Chiki-chiki"	12	48	60	1
8	Marzok Mangui	"Caramelo"	7	24	31	5
9	La Casa Azul	"La revolución sexual"	10	32	42	3
10	Coral	"Todo está en tu mente"	8	40	48	2

==== Controversy ====
RTVE highlighted that the involvement of a MySpace platform in Salvemos Eurovisión was to make the selection process "more democratic" with the idea of discovering new talents. However, the Internet voting process, which the general public could vote for any of the artists interested in participating, was accused of being easily distorted with the participation of comedic acts including the eventual winner Rodolfo Chikilicuatre, a comedian who collaborates on the late night show Buenafuente, hosted by popular comedian Andreu Buenafuente on the private channel laSexta.

During the Internet vote, "La bicicletera" performed by comedic act El Gato received over 70,000 votes in two days, however most of them were removed after allegedly discovering that they were generated through scripts and were thus fraudulent. Users of Internet forums claimed they decided to rise El Gato to the first places of the vote after Buenafuente refused to recognize the fraudulent support for Chikilicuatre.

=== Preparation ===
Following Salvemos Eurovisión, the lyrics of "Baila el Chiki-chiki" were changed for the Eurovision Song Contest in accordance to the European Broadcasting Union (EBU) rules, due to its political content regarding the referencing of political figures Mariano Rajoy, Hugo Chávez and José Luis Rodríguez Zapatero. The official video of the song premiered on 14 March 2008 on RTVE's website. The music video served as the official preview video for the Spanish entry.

=== Promotion ===
Rodolfo Chikilicuatre's pre-contest promotion for "Baila el Chiki-chiki" was focused in Spain, including appearances on the morning show Esta mañana on La 1 and on the news programme El Intermedio on laSexta on 3 February. On 30 April, Chikilicuatre performed "Baila el Chiki-chiki" during the 2008 Spanish motorcycle Grand Prix, which took place at the Circuito de Jerez in Jerez de la Frontera.

== At Eurovision ==
It was announced in September 2007 that the competition's format would be expanded to two semi-finals in 2008. According to Eurovision rules, all nations with the exceptions of the host country and the "Big Four" (France, Germany, Spain and the United Kingdom) are required to qualify from one of two semi-finals in order to compete for the final; the top nine songs from each semi-final as determined by televoting progress to the final, and a tenth was determined by back-up juries. As a member of the "Big 4", Spain automatically qualified to compete in the final on 24 May 2008. In addition to their participation in the final, Spain is also required to broadcast and vote in one of the two semi-finals. During the semi-final allocation draw on 24 January 2008, Spain was assigned to broadcast and vote in the first semi-final on 20 May 2008.

In Spain, the first semi-final was broadcast on La 2 and the final was broadcast on La 1 with commentary by José Luis Uribarri. RTVE appointed Ainhoa Arbizu as its spokesperson to announce during the final the Spanish votes. The broadcast of the final was watched by 9.336 million viewers in Spain with a market share of 59.3%. This represented an increase of 31.3% from the previous year with 5.963 million more viewers.

=== Final ===
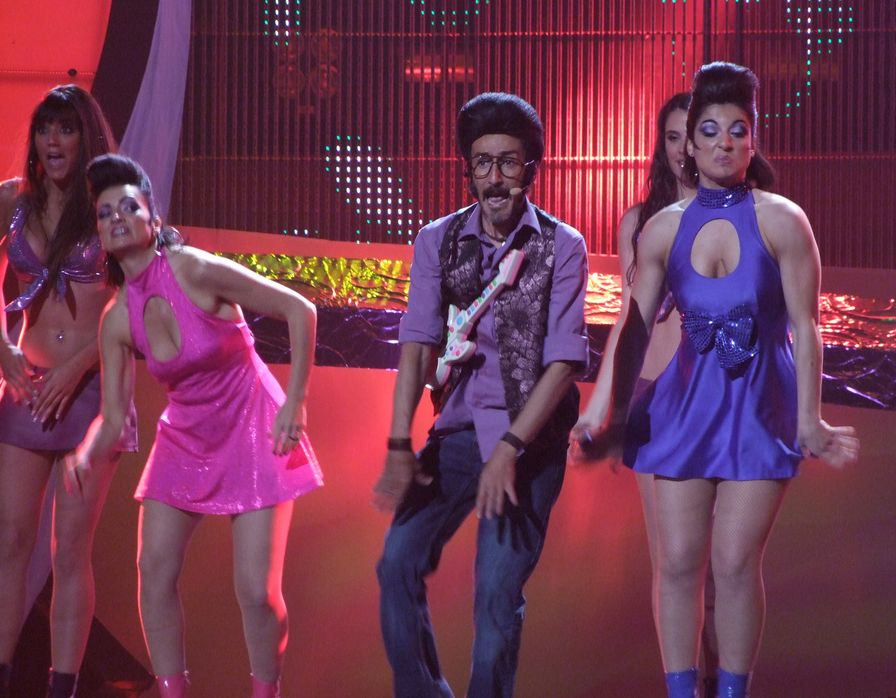
Rodolfo Chikilicuatre during a rehearsal before the final

Rodolfo Chikilicuatre took part in technical rehearsals on 17 and 18 May, followed by dress rehearsals on 23 and 24 May. During the running order draw for the semi-final and final on 17 March 2008, Spain was placed to perform in position 22, following the entry from Greece and before the entry from Serbia.

The Spanish performance featured Rodolfo Chikilicuatre on stage wearing a purple shirt and jeans, joined by five dancers wearing short dresses in various colours. The performance began with Chikilicuatre playing the nursery rhyme "Twinkle, Twinkle, Little Star" on a toy guitar. The stage lighting and LED screens displayed bright colours and the names of the four distinct dances mentioned in the song: "brikindans", "crusaíto", "maiquelyason" and "robocop". The performance also featured the use of smoke and pyrotechnic effects. The choreographer for the performance was Mayte Marcos. The five dancers that joined Rodolfo Chikilicuatre were Disco, Gráfica (Silvia Abril), Leticia Martín, María Ángeles Mas and Cecilia López. Martín, Mas and López were selected by Marcos through the special casting show Dansin Chiki Chiki. During the performance, Gráfica purposely slipped and danced clumsily without knowing the basic dance steps. Spain placed sixteenth in the final, scoring 55 points.

=== Voting ===
Below is a breakdown of points awarded to Spain and awarded by Spain in the first semi-final and grand final of the contest. The nation awarded its 12 points to Andorra in the semi-final and to Romania in the final of the contest.

==== Points awarded to Spain ====
Points awarded to Spain (Final)
Score	Country
12 points	Andorra
10 points	Portugal
8 points	Greece
7 points	
6 points	
5 points	France
4 points	Belgium; Cyprus; Switzerland
3 points	Turkey
2 points	
1 point	Albania; Armenia; Denmark; Finland; United Kingdom

==== Points awarded by Spain ====
Points awarded by Spain (Semi-final 1)
Score	Country
12 points	Andorra
10 points	Armenia
8 points	Romania
7 points	Greece
6 points	Finland
5 points	Russia
4 points	Israel
3 points	Poland
2 points	Norway
1 point	Ireland

Points awarded by Spain (Final)
Score	Country
12 points	Romania
10 points	Armenia
8 points	Portugal
7 points	Ukraine
6 points	Norway
5 points	Russia
4 points	Iceland
3 points	Greece
2 points	Latvia
1 point	Sweden
