= Rodolfo Chikilicuatre =

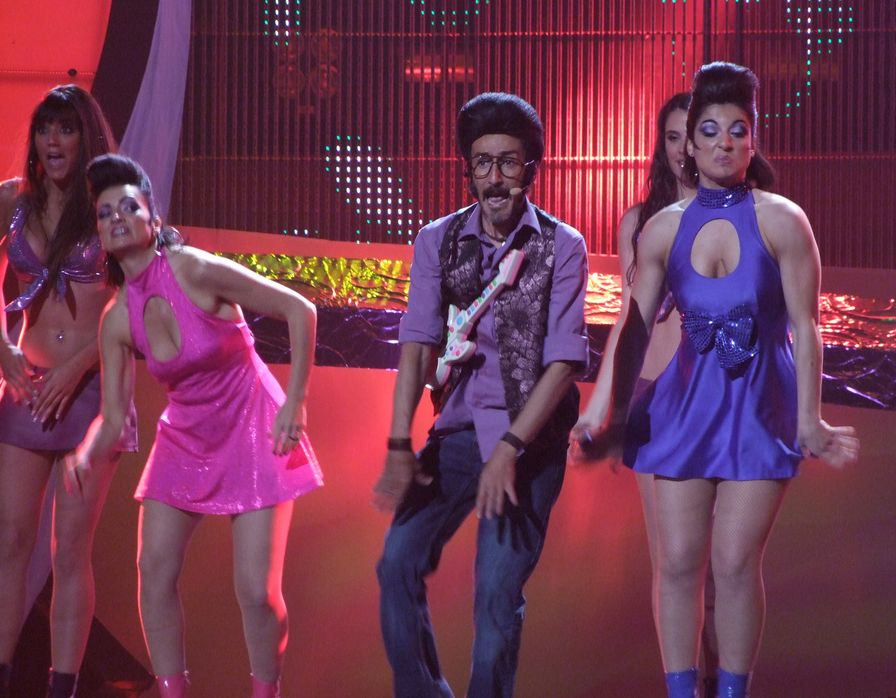
- Ortiz performing as Rodolfo Chikilicuatre during Eurovision Song Contest 2008

Background information
- Born: David Fernández Ortiz; 24 June 1970 (age 56)
- Origin: Igualada, Barcelona, Spain
- Genres: Reggaeton; comedy
- Instruments: Singing, toy guitar

Rodolfo Chikilicuatre (Spanish pronunciation: [roˈðolfo tʃikiliˈkwatɾe]; born 1972) is a Spanish comedic character played by David Fernández Ortiz (born 24 June 1970) and first introduced in the Spanish late night show Buenafuente as an improvisational act. Rodolfo was interviewed as the inventor of the vibrator-guitar. The character rose to fame after he was later presented by the show's host, Andreu Buenafuente, with a song called "Baila el Chiki-chiki" (Dance the Chiki-chiki), a parody of reggaeton music filled with jokes and political references. The show's host decided to enter the song into the Spanish selection process for the Eurovision Song Contest 2008, where it was chosen. Rodolfo landed Spain's best placement since Eurovision Song Contest 2004.

== Creation of the character ==
In a new phase for the Buenafuente (BFN) show on La Sexta, David Fernández, in the short-lived Actor de Guardia section, started to play various characters related to current issues, chosen at random. On 21 January 2008, based on news of the invention of a guitar which was connected to a vibrator, he played the role of the Argentinian character Ricardo Rosanti, who claimed to be the device's inventor. Then, on 5 February, he reappeared, now under the name Rodolfo Chikilicuatre and, as a thank you, played Buenafuente a reggaeton-style song named Baila el Chiki chiki. The piece was presumably composed by Santiago Segura (lyrics) and Pedro Guerra (music), as reflected in many media outlets. The sketch was entirely a parody for the programme.

== Eurovision Song Contest 2008 and "Baila el Chiki-chiki" ==
For the Eurovision Song Contest 2008, the Spanish broadcaster RTVE decided to make the song selection process more democratic, so, in an agreement with MySpace, a webpage was created where the general public could vote for any of the artists who were interested in participating, possibly discovering new talents. Any aspiring singer could upload a video to enter the contest. The top 5 voted videos, along with 5 more entries selected by a jury, went to a televised final where the Spanish Eurovision Song Contest 2008 entry would be chosen.

More than 530 songs were submitted, the comedic act of Rodolfo Chikilicuatre and his "Baila el Chiki-chiki" song among them. The song was heavily promoted by late night show Buenafuente and television channel La Sexta that aired the show, and ended up being selected by a landslide, earning 56.28% of the votes, well ahead of the runner-up, which earned only 14.6%. The winner was chosen through text messaging.

This selection was met with a certain degree of controversy, as many considered it a gimmick song, and not worthy of representing Spain. It also met controversy because Rodolfo Chikilicuatre was a comedic act, with no prior songs, and was backed by a particular show (Buenafuente) and a private broadcaster (LaSexta). RTVE stood by their choice of voting system.

On 11 March 2008 Rodolfo announced some changes to the lyrics of his song to comply with the rules of the Eurovision Song Contest, thus removing partially the names of the politicians included in the song (José Luis Rodríguez Zapatero, Hugo Chávez and Mariano Rajoy). Even if Chávez's name was completely removed, a reference to a previous incident with Spanish King Juan Carlos I was kept. A non-political reference to Serbia was added. The song was also made longer, as the original was considered too short, going from 1:20 to 2:56 minutes, and several verses in English were added. The new version was presented on 14 March 2008.

Rodolfo performed the "Chiki-chiki" theme with other singers: King Africa, Tata Golosa, Mojinos Escozios and Dustin the Turkey.

During the final contest of the Eurovision 2008 on 24 May 2008, the song "Baila el Chiki-chiki" reached 16th place with 55 points, tied with Albania.

=== Singles ===
Year	Title	Peak				
Year	Title	SPA	GRE	POR	SWE	FRA
2008	"Baila el Chiki-chiki"	1	1	1	12	20

== See also ==
- Spain in the Eurovision Song Contest 2008

Preceded by D'NASH with "I Love You Mi Vida"	Spain in the Eurovision Song Contest; 2008	Succeeded by Soraya with "La noche es para mí"
