= J Rice =

American singer

- Also known as: J Rice
- Born: Joshua Adam Rice
- Origin: Spanaway, Washington
- Genres: Pop, R&B, House
- Occupations: Singer, songwriter, music producer, audio engineer, video editor
- Instruments: Vocals, piano, trumpet, drums, saxophone
- Years active: 2005–present
- Label: None
- Website: http://jricemusic.net

Joshua Rice (born in Washington state, US) better known as J Rice is an independent American Conscious Pop and R&B artist. He has released six albums: The Intro (2005), So Close (2008), Phantom Boyz Present: J Rice (2011), 12+ (2014), Joshua (2017) and The Feels (2020). He was signed with Lil T records label. He has been a YouTuber since 2011, building two channels: J Rice Productions and Mineworks Animations. Those channels have accumulated over 400 million views, and over 1 million subscribers.

== Career ==
J Rice is from a musical family. His mother sang opera, grandmother played the violin, and great-great-grandfather was in a 5-piece quartet with his brothers and sisters.[2] Josh came on to the scene in 2005 with his first co-produced/written/mixed album "The Intro" with Lil T where he continued to experiment with different sounds, collaborators, and social networks. He remained unsigned despite production and record deals being offered throughout his career. After one of his songs "Thank You for the Broken Heart" leaked from A&R email and started going viral on YouTube, J decided to focus his energies there, where he would build a following of over 200,000 subscribers. He later partnered with a small animation channel, and started making original songs and parodies, growing that channel to over 750,000 subscribers and over 300 million views.

In 2016, J started focusing his time on making a new album that would reflect his newfound view of the world, and showcase a diverse range of genres. The album Joshua featured these new concepts and some experimental sounds.

=== Music and collaborations ===
J Rice is known for his multi-layer solo interpretations as well as cooperation with many online artists like Ahmir, Jason Chen, Kurt Schneider, David Sides, the then unknown and the eventual American Idol season 11 runner-up Jessica Sanchez [4] and many others.

J Rice was also featured in Stella Mwangi's 2011 album Kinanda on the track "Throw Me a Ladder". Mwengi's album, her second, reached number 15 on the Norwegian VG-lista official albums chart.

He also did a collaboration with The Piano Guys, singing "More Than Words".

== Discography ==
=== Albums ===
- 2005: The Intro
- 2008: So Close
- 2013: J Rice Acoustic
- 2014: J Rice Mashups EP
- 2014: 12 and 12+ (2 CDs, 24 original tracks)
- 2015: Songs About Minecraft and Songs About Minecraft (Deluxe)
- 2017: Joshua
- 2020: The Feels

=== Mixtapes ===
- 2009: HeartBreakerz: The Official Mixtape (The Phantom Boyz (Chappell/Warner), and JUiCY RNB, in cooperation with DJ Benihana)

=== Singles ===
- 2010: "Afraid of Love" written by Joshua Rice, Produced by The Phantom Boyz
- 2011: "Thank You for the Broken Heart" written by Joshua Rice, Produced by Big City
- 2014: "Stay"

=== Appearances ===
- 2010: "Luv The Way U Lie (Not Afraid)" (J Rice feat Staz in Staz' album Dooomed)
- 2010: "DJ Got Us Falling Love Again (Unofficial Remix)" (J Rice feat Staz in Staz' album Dooomed)
- 2010: "We Are the World 25 for Haiti (YouTube edition)" (YouTube All Stars)
- 2010: "California Gurls (Staz Remix)" (J Rice feat Staz in Staz' album Dooomed)
- 2011: "Throw Me a Ladder" (Stella Mwangi feat J Rice on Mwangi's album Kinanda)
- 2011: "We Pray For You" (Japanese Tsunami Tribute)" (55 Youtubers)
- 2011: "More Than Words" (The Piano Guys)
