= Hanne Sørvaag =

Norwegian singer-songwriter (born 1979)

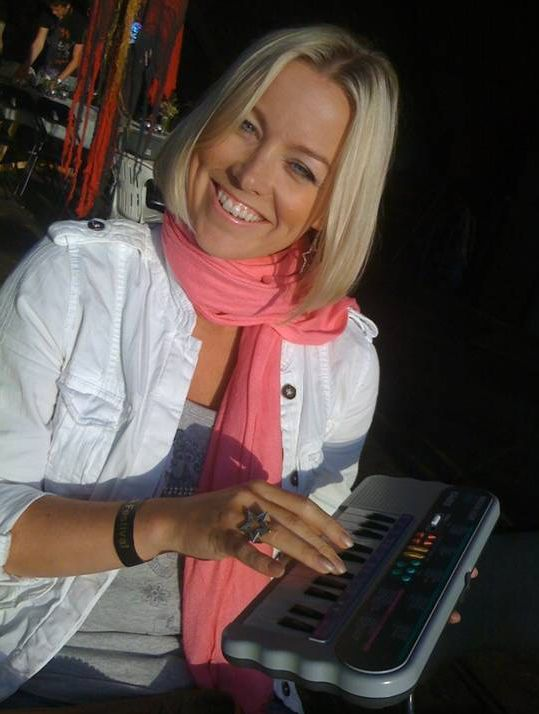
- Hanne Sørvaag

Background information
- Born: 27 December 1979 (age 45)
- Origin: Stavanger, Norway
- Occupation(s): singer, songwriter
- Years active: 2002–present
- Labels: daWorks Records
- Website: http://hannesorvaag.com/

Hanne Margrethe Fredriksen Sørvaag (born 27 December 1979) is a Norwegian singer-songwriter. For many years she was based in Stockholm, Sweden, mostly composing for other artists via Universal. Today she works from Oslo, Norway and has a career as a recording and performing artist.

She released her first album, You Know Me (Sony/Columbia), under the artist name Paris in 2002, an album that gave her three fair radio hits in Norway. Her second album, Talk of the Town (Diamond Road Music), was released in 2006 under her own name. The first single from the album was "I Don't Feel a Thing".

Apart from her career as a performing artist, she has also been successful writing for other artists, notably "My Destiny" (co-written by Tim Baxter and Harry Sommerdahl), which was performed by Katharine McPhee in the American Idol finals in 2006. Several other international and Norwegian artists have performed her songs. She often cites Sheryl Crow as a major influence on her music.

In 2012, she released an album with her own versions of songs she had written for other artists, Cover me. In Norway this has been her most successful album to date, making the top 10 of the national chart.

In 2012, she moved to Copenhagen, Denmark.

== Eurovision ==
In March 2008, the song "Disappear" composed by Hanne and Danish songwriters Thomas Troelsen and Remee won the German preselection for the Eurovision Song Contest 2008 performed by No Angels. The song therefore represented Germany in the Eurovision final in Belgrade on 24 May 2008. This is not the first time she has been involved in Eurovision, having co-written the song "You've Got a Hold On Me" sung by Linda Kvam in the Norwegian Melodi Grand Prix in 2003.

== Eurovision 2010 ==
The Norwegian and Georgian entries in the 2010 Eurovision Song Contest were both co-written by Hanne Sørvaag.

She and Fredrik Kempe wrote the Norwegian entry, "My Heart Is Yours" (sung by Didrik Solli-Tangen), which was directly qualified for the Grand Final, where it finished 20th.

Along with Harry Sommerdahl and Christian Leuzzi, Sørvaag also wrote the Georgian entry, "Shine", sung by Sofia Nizharadze. The Georgian entry finished third in the second semi-final, thus qualifying for the Grand Final, where it finished 9th, Georgia's first top 10 result in the Contest.

Sørvaag composed "Twilight" for Soraya Arnelas, who represented Spain at the Eurovision Song Contest 2009.

== Melodi Grand Prix 2011 ==
She participated in the Melodi Grand Prix 2011 with two songs, "You’re Like a Melody", which was written and sung by her, and "Guns & Boys", which was co-written by her and sung by Carina Dahl.

== Eurovision Song Contest entries ==
- "Disappear" by No Angels, Germany, (Eurovision Song Contest 2008), 23rd place
- "My Heart Is Yours" by Didrik Solli-Tangen, Norway, (Eurovision Song Contest 2010), 20th place
- "Shine" by Sofia Nizharadze, Georgia, (Eurovision Song Contest 2010), 9th place

== Entries in national Eurovision pre-selections ==
- "You've Got a Hold On Me" by Linda Kvam (Norway 2003), 5th place
- "Tricky" by Velvet Inc. (Norway 2009)
- "Do It Again" by Foxy (Norway 2009)
- "You're Like a Melody" by Hanne Sørvaag (Norway 2011)
- "Guns & Boys" by Carina Dahl (Norway 2011)
- "Make It Better" by Tommy Fredvang (Norway 2012)

== Discography ==
=== Albums ===
| Year | Album | Charts | Certification |
| Year | Album | NOR | Certification |
|---|---|---|---|
| 2002 | You Know Me | – | |
| 2006 | Talk of the Town | – | |
| 2011 | Cover Me | 9 | |
| 2012 | All Is Forgiven | 14 | |
| 2013 | Christmas Lights | 40 | |
