= Norway in the Eurovision Song Contest 2011 =

- Eurovision Song Contest 2011
- Participating broadcaster: Norsk rikskringkasting (NRK)
- Country: Norway
- Selection process: Melodi Grand Prix 2011
- Selection date: 12 February 2011

Competing entry
- Song: "Haba Haba"
- Artist: Stella Mwangi
- Songwriters: Big City; Beyond51; Stella Mwangi

Placement
- Semi-final result: Failed to qualify (17th)

Participation chronology

Norway was represented at the Eurovision Song Contest 2011 with the song "Haba Haba" written by Beyond51, Big City and Stella Mwangi. The song was performed by Stella Mwangi. The Norwegian Broadcasting Corporation (NRK) organised the national final Melodi Grand Prix 2011 in order to select the Norwegian entry for the 2011 contest in Düsseldorf, Germany. 21 entries competed in the national final that consisted of three semi-finals, a Last Chance round and a final. Eight entries ultimately qualified to compete in the final on 12 February 2011 where the winner was determined over two rounds of voting. In the first round of voting, a public televote exclusively selected the top four entries to advance to the competition's second round—the Gold Final. In the second round of voting, "Haba Haba" performed by Stella Mwangi was selected as the winner following the combination of votes from four regional jury groups and a public vote.

Norway was drawn to compete in the first semi-final of the Eurovision Song Contest which took place on 10 May 2011. Performing during the show in position 2, "Haba Haba" was not announced among the top 10 entries of the first semi-final and therefore did not qualify to compete in the final. It was later revealed that Norway placed seventeenth out of the 19 participating countries in the semi-final with 30 points.

== Background ==
Prior to the 2011 contest, Norway had participated in the Eurovision Song Contest 49 times since its first entry in 1960. Norway had won the contest on two occasions: in 1985 with the song "La det swinge" performed by Bobbysocks! and in 1995 with the song "Nocturne" performed by Secret Garden. Norway also had the two dubious distinctions of having finished last in the Eurovision final more than any other country and for having the most "nul points" (zero points) in the contest, the latter being a record the nation shared together with Austria. The country had finished last 10 times and had failed to score a point during four contests. Following the introduction of semi-finals in 2004, Norway has, to this point, finished in the top 10 three times: Wig Wam finished ninth with the song "In My Dreams" in 2005, Maria Haukaas Storeng was fifth in 2008 with "Hold On Be Strong", and Alexander Rybak won in 2009.

The Norwegian national broadcaster, Norsk rikskringkasting (NRK), broadcasts the event within Norway and organises the selection process for the nation's entry. NRK confirmed their intentions to participate at the 2011 Eurovision Song Contest on 30 June 2010. The broadcaster has traditionally organised the national final Melodi Grand Prix, which has selected the Norwegian entry for the Eurovision Song Contest in all but one of their participation. Along with their participation confirmation, the broadcaster revealed details regarding their selection procedure and announced the organization of Melodi Grand Prix 2011 in order to select the 2011 Norwegian entry.

== Before Eurovision ==
=== Melodi Grand Prix 2011 ===
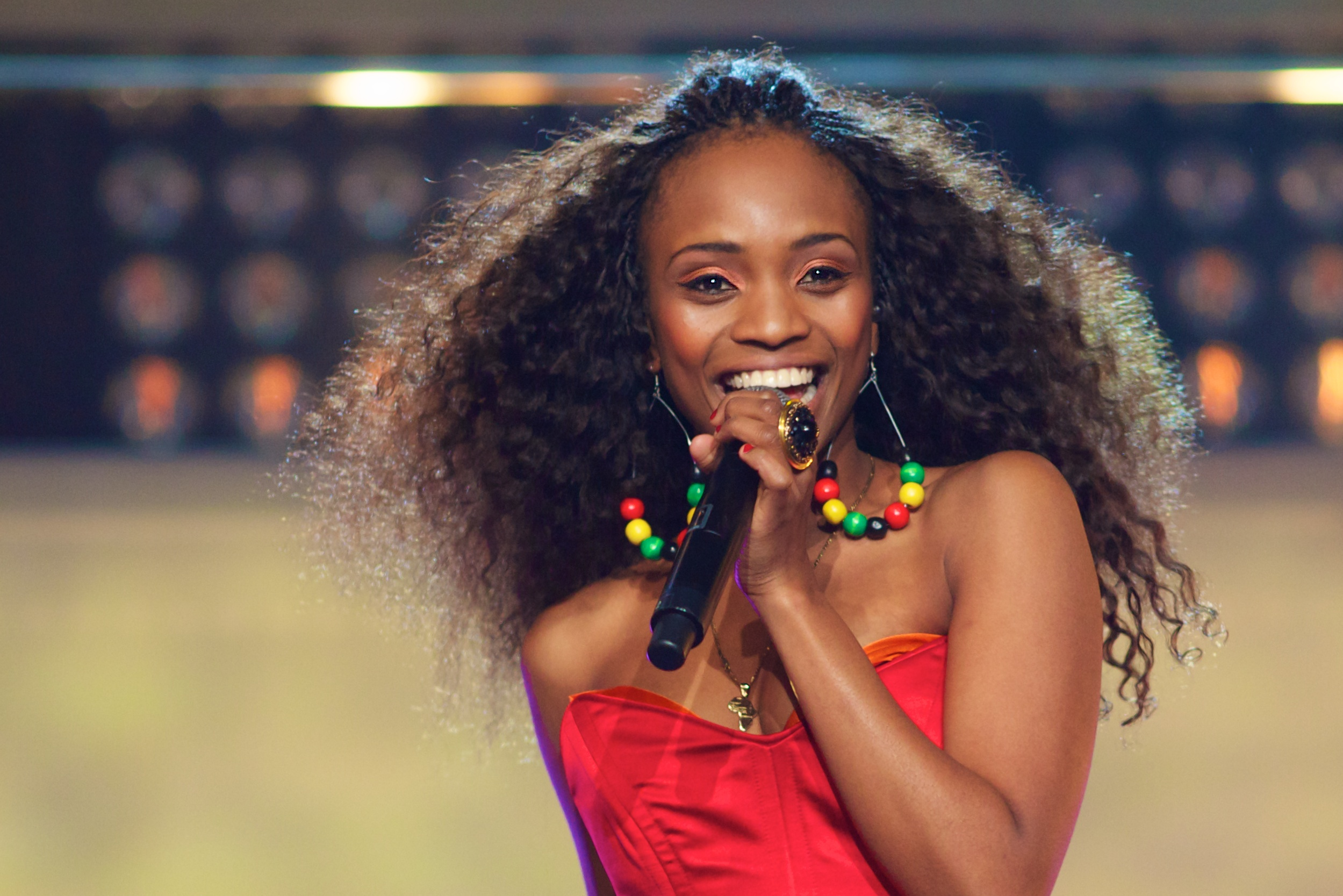
Winner Stella Mwangi performing "Haba Haba" at the third semi-final of Melodi Grand Prix 2011

Melodi Grand Prix 2011 was the 49th edition of the Norwegian national final Melodi Grand Prix and selected Norway's entry for the Eurovision Song Contest 2011. 21 songs were selected to compete in a five-week-long process that commenced on 15 January 2011 and concluded with the final on 12 February 2011. All shows were hosted by Per Sundnes and Anne Rimmen and televised on NRK1 as well as streamed online at NRK's official website nrk.no. The final was also broadcast online at the official Eurovision Song Contest website eurovision.tv.

==== Format ====
The competition consisted of five shows: three semi-finals on 15, 22 and 29 January 2011, a Last Chance round (Sistesjansen) on 5 February 2011 and a final on 12 February 2011. Seven songs competed in each semi-final and the top two entries directly qualified to the final, while the entries that placed third and fourth proceeded to the Last Chance round. Two wildcards were also awarded to the two acts that received the most votes out of the bottom three songs in the semi-finals to proceed to the Last Chance round. An additional two entries qualified to the final from the Last Chance round. The results of the semi-finals and Last Chance round were determined exclusively by public televoting, while the results in the final were determined by jury voting and public televoting. Viewers could cast their votes through telephone and SMS voting.

==== Competing entries ====
A submission period was opened by NRK between 30 June 2010 and 15 September 2010. Songwriters of any nationality were allowed to submit entries, while performers of the selected songs would be chosen by NRK in consultation with the songwriters. In addition to the public call for submissions, NRK reserved the right to directly invite certain artists and composers to compete. 700 submissions were received at the close of the deadline and 21 songs were selected for the competition by Melodi Grand Prix music producer Per Sundnes and choreographer Mattias Carlsson. Nine of the competing acts and songs were revealed on 22 November 2010 during a press conference at the Hard Rock Café in Oslo, presented by Per Sundnes, while the remaining twelve acts and songs were revealed on 29 November 2010 during another press conference at the Hard Rock Café in Oslo and presented by Sundnes.

| Artist | Song | Songwriter(s) |
|---|---|---|
| Åste and Rikke | "Not That Easy (Ah-Åh-Ah-Åh)" | Rikke Normann |
| Babel Fish | "Depend on Me" | Halvor Holter, Tarjei Van Ravens |
| Carina Dahl | "Guns & Boys" | Carina Dahl, Nanna Martorell, Hanne Sørvaag |
| Endre | "Oh, Oh (Puppy Love)" | Samsaya Sharma, Jarl Aanestad |
| Gatas Parlament | "Jobbe litt mindre og tjene litt mer" | Alex Molkom, Aslak Borgersrud, Elling Borgersrud, Martin Raknerud |
| Girl Happy | "SOS" | Tor Einar Krogtoft-Jensen, Christoffer Bergersen |
| Grethe Svensen | "Like Dreamers Do" | Grethe Svensen, Tommy Berre, Simon Walker |
| Hanne Sørvaag | "You're Like a Melody" | Hanne Sørvaag, Martin Hansen |
| Helene Bøksle | "Vardlokk" | Helene Bøksle, Sindre Hotvedt, Knut Avenstroup Haugen, Cecilie Larsen |
| Isabella Leroy | "Sand" | Isabella Leroy |
| Marika | "Hungry for You (Gipsydance)" | Marika Lejon |
| Mimi Blix | "Allergic" | Merethe La Verdi, Kjetil Schei |
| Noora Noor | "Gone With the Wind" | Simone Larsen, Moh Denebi, Jennifer Brown, Bjørn Djupström |
| Pernille and Marius | "I'll Be Yours" | Ovi, Johanna Demker, Björn Djupström |
| Sichelle | "Trenger mer" | Christine Dancke |
| Sie Gubba | "Alt du vil ha" | Magne Almås, Petter Øien |
| Stella Mwangi | "Haba Haba" | Beyond51, Big City, Stella Mwangi |
| Susperia | "Nothing Remains" | Terje Andersen, Christian Hagen, Kenneth Åkesson, Håkon Didriksen, Øyvind Mustaparta, Pål Mathiesen |
| The BlackSheeps | "Dance Tonight" | Agnete Johnsen, Emelie Nilsen |
| The Lucky Bullets | "Fire Below" | Knud Kleppe |
| Use Me | "Daisy" | Jim André Bergsted |

==== Semi-finals ====
Seven songs competed in each of the three semi-finals that took place on 15, 22 and 29 January 2011. The first semi-final took place at the Hangar E of the Ørland Hovedflystasjon in Ørland, the second semi-final took place at the Florø Idrettssenter in Florø, and the third semi-final took place at the Skien Fritidspark in Skien. In each semi-final the top two directly qualified to the final, while the third and fourth placed songs proceeded to the Last Chance round. On 31 January 2011, the two acts with the most votes out of the bottom three songs in the semi-finals that also proceeded to the Last Chance round as wildcards were announced: "Jobbe litt mindre og tjene litt mer" performed by Gatas Parlament and "I'll Be Yours" performed by Pernille and Marius.

In addition to the performances of the competing entries, a past Norwegian Eurovision entrant and a past Melodi Grand Prix participant were featured in each semi-final as the interval act: Keep of Kalessin from Melodi Grand Prix 2010 with Norwegian Eurovision 2009 winner Alexander Rybak in the first semi-final, Alexander Stenerud from Melodi Grand Prix 2009 and 2010 with 2007 Norwegian Eurovision entrant Guri Schanke in the second semi-final, and Bjørn Johan Muri from Melodi Grand Prix 2010 with 2010 Norwegian Eurovision entrant Didrik Solli-Tangen in the third semi-final.

Semi-final 1 – 15 January 2011
| R/O | Artist | Song | Place | Result |
|---|---|---|---|---|
| 1 | Carina Dahl | "Guns & Boys" | 6 | —N/a |
| 2 | Use Me | "Daisy" | 4 | Last Chance |
| 3 | Helene Bøksle | "Vardlokk" | 2 | Final |
| 4 | Sie Gubba | "Alt du vil ha" | 3 | Last Chance |
| 5 | Gatas Parlament | "Jobbe litt mindre og tjene litt mer" | 5 | Last Chance |
| 6 | Sichelle | "Trenger mer" | 7 | —N/a |
| 7 | Åste and Rikke | "Not That Easy (Ah-Åh-Ah-Åh)" | 1 | Final |

Semi-final 2 – 22 January 2011
| R/O | Artist | Song | Place | Result |
|---|---|---|---|---|
| 1 | Pernille and Marius | "I'll Be Yours" | 5 | Last Chance |
| 2 | Babel Fish | "Depend on Me" | 1 | Final |
| 3 | Marika | "Hungry for You (Gipsydance)" | 7 | —N/a |
| 4 | Isabella Leroy | "Sand" | 6 | —N/a |
| 5 | Endre | "Oh, Oh (Puppy Love)" | 3 | Last Chance |
| 6 | Hanne Sørvaag | "You're Like a Melody" | 2 | Final |
| 7 | Mimi Blix | "Allergic" | 4 | Last Chance |

Semi-final 3 – 29 January 2011
| R/O | Artist | Song | Place | Result |
|---|---|---|---|---|
| 1 | Susperia | "Nothing Remains" | 4 | Last Chance |
| 2 | Noora Noor | "Gone With the Wind" | 5 | —N/a |
| 3 | Girl Happy | "SOS" | 6 | —N/a |
| 4 | Grethe Svensen | "Like Dreamers Do" | 7 | —N/a |
| 5 | The BlackSheeps | "Dance Tonight" | 2 | Final |
| 6 | Stella Mwangi | "Haba Haba" | 1 | Final |
| 7 | The Lucky Bullets | "Fire Below" | 3 | Last Chance |

==== Last Chance round ====
The Last Chance round took place on 5 February 2011 at the Sparta Amfi in Sarpsborg. The six entries that placed third and fourth in the preceding three semi-finals as well as the two wildcards competed and the two entries that qualified to the final were selected over two rounds of voting. In the first round, the eight entries competed in four duels and the winners of each duel proceeded to the second round. In the second round, the remaining four entries competed in two duels and the winners of each duel qualified to the final. In addition to the performances of the competing entries, the interval act featured the lead singer of 2005 Norwegian Eurovision entrant Wig Wam, Åge Sten Nielsen, performing a rendition of his entry "In My Dreams" together with Norwegian 2008 entrant Maria Haukaas Mittet.

First Round – 5 February 2011
| Duel | R/O | Artist | Song | Result |
|---|---|---|---|---|
| I | 1 | Use Me | "Daisy" | Second Round |
| I | 2 | Pernille and Marius | "I'll Be Yours" | —N/a |
| II | 3 | Sie Gubba | "Alt du vil ha" | Second Round |
| II | 4 | Mimi Blix | "Allergic" | —N/a |
| III | 5 | Gatas Parlament | "Jobbe litt mindre og tjene litt mer" | —N/a |
| III | 6 | The Lucky Bullets | "Fire Below" | Second Round |
| IV | 7 | Endre | "Oh, Oh (Puppy Love)" | —N/a |
| IV | 8 | Susperia | "Nothing Remains" | Second Round |

Second Round – 5 February 2011
| Duel | R/O | Artist | Song | Result |
|---|---|---|---|---|
| I | 1 | Use Me | "Daisy" | —N/a |
| I | 2 | Sie Gubba | "Alt du vil ha" | Final |
| II | 3 | The Lucky Bullets | "Fire Below" | Final |
| II | 4 | Susperia | "Nothing Remains" | —N/a |

==== Final ====
Eight songs that qualified from the preceding three semi-finals and the Last Chance round competed during the final at the Oslo Spektrum in Oslo on 12 February 2011. The winner was selected over two rounds of voting. In the first round, the top four entries were selected by public televoting to proceed to the second round, the Gold Final. In the Gold Final, four regional juries from the three semi-final and Last Chance round host cities each distributed points as follows: 2,000, 4,000, 6,000 and 8,000 points. The votes of the audience in the venue and the results of the public televote were then revealed, leading to the victory of "Haba Haba" performed by Stella Mwangi with 280,217 votes. In addition to the performances of the competing entries, the show was opened with the Eurovision 2010 winning entry "Satellite" being performed by Bjørn Johan Muri, Nadia Hasnaoui and several past Norwegian Eurovision entrants: Benedicte Adrian (1984), Tor Endresen (1997), Åge Sten Nielsen (2005), Guri Schanke (2007) and Maria Haukaas Mittet (2008), while the interval act featured 2010 Norwegian Eurovision entrant Didrik Solli-Tangen performing his entry "My Heart Is Yours" together with the Oslo Fagottkor.

Final – 12 February 2011
| R/O | Artist | Song | Result |
|---|---|---|---|
| 1 | Helene Bøksle | "Vardlokk" | —N/a |
| 2 | Sie Gubba | "Alt du vil ha" | Gold Final |
| 3 | Babel Fish | "Depend on Me" | —N/a |
| 4 | The Lucky Bullets | "Fire Below" | Gold Final |
| 5 | The BlackSheeps | "Dance Tonight" | Gold Final |
| 6 | Stella Mwangi | "Haba Haba" | Gold Final |
| 7 | Åste and Rikke | "Not That Easy (Ah-Åh-Ah-Åh)" | —N/a |
| 8 | Hanne Sørvaag | "You're Like a Melody" | —N/a |

Gold Final – 12 February 2011
| R/O | Artist | Song | Jury | Public | Total | Place |
|---|---|---|---|---|---|---|
| 1 | The BlackSheeps | "Dance Tonight" | 26,000 | 129,059 | 155,059 | 2 |
| 2 | Sie Gubba | "Allt du vil ha" | 10,000 | 84,884 | 94,884 | 4 |
| 3 | Stella Mwangi | "Haba Haba" | 28,000 | 252,217 | 280,217 | 1 |
| 4 | The Lucky Bullets | "Fire Below" | 16,000 | 99,793 | 115,793 | 3 |

Detailed Regional Jury Votes
| R/O | Song | Ørland | Florø | Skien | Sarpsborg | Total |
|---|---|---|---|---|---|---|
| 1 | "Dance Tonight" | 8,000 | 8,000 | 6,000 | 4,000 | 26,000 |
| 2 | "Allt du vil ha" | 4,000 | 2,000 | 2,000 | 2,000 | 10,000 |
| 3 | "Haba Haba" | 6,000 | 6,000 | 8,000 | 8,000 | 28,000 |
| 4 | "Fire Below" | 2,000 | 4,000 | 4,000 | 6,000 | 16,000 |
Spokespersons
Ørland – Maria Haukaas Mittet; Florø – Tor Endresen; Skien – Guri Schanke; Sarpsborg – Åge Sten Nilsen

Detailed Public Voting Results
| R/O | Song | Audience | Televoting Regions | | Total |
| R/O | Song | Audience | North, West and South | East and Central | Total |
|---|---|---|---|---|---|
| 1 | "Dance Tonight" | 1,602 | 50,088 | 77,369 | 129,059 |
| 2 | "Allt du vil ha" | 386 | 25,906 | 58,592 | 84,884 |
| 3 | "Haba Haba" | 3,616 | 121,388 | 127,213 | 252,217 |
| 4 | "Fire Below" | 2,397 | 51,976 | 45,420 | 99,793 |
Spokespersons
Audience – Lars Mikkelsen; Televote – Nadia Hasnaoui

==== Ratings ====
Viewing figures by show
| Show | Date | Viewers (in millions) | Ref. |
|---|---|---|---|
| Semi-final 1 | 15 January 2011 | 1.078 | |
| Semi-final 2 | 22 January 2011 | 1.05 | |
| Semi-final 3 | 29 January 2011 | 0.947 | |
| Last Chance (Part 1) | 5 February 2011 | 0.875 | |
| Last Chance (Part 2) | 5 February 2011 | 0.677 | |
| Final | 12 February 2011 | 1.295 | |

=== Preparation ===
In early April 2011, Stella Mwangi filmed the music video for "Haba Haba" in Grünerløkka and at the Huk beach in Bygdøy together with hundreds of attendees. The video, which was directed by Frederic Esnault and presented by Big City Music, was released to the public on 19 April.

== At Eurovision ==
According to Eurovision rules, all nations with the exceptions of the host country and the "Big Five" (France, Germany, Italy, Spain and the United Kingdom) are required to qualify from one of two semi-finals in order to compete for the final; the top ten countries from each semi-final progress to the final. The European Broadcasting Union (EBU) split up the competing countries into six different pots based on voting patterns from previous contests, with countries with favourable voting histories put into the same pot. On 17 January 2011, an allocation draw was held which placed each country into one of the two semi-finals, as well as which half of the show they would perform in. Norway was placed into the first semi-final, to be held on 10 May 2011, and was scheduled to perform in the first half of the show. The running order for the semi-finals was decided through another draw on 15 March 2011 and Norway was set to perform in position 2, following the entry from Poland and before the entry from Albania.

In Norway, the two semi-finals and the final were broadcast on NRK1 with commentary by Olav Viksmo-Slettan. The Norwegian spokesperson, who announced the Norwegian votes during the final, was Nadia Hasnaoui who co-hosted the Eurovision Song Contest 2010.

=== Semi-final ===
Stella Mwangi took part in technical rehearsals on 1 and 5 May, followed by dress rehearsals on 9 and 10 May. This included the jury show on 9 May where the professional juries of each country watched and voted on the competing entries.

The Norwegian performance featured Stella Mwangi performing a choreographed routine on stage in a gold dress together with five backing vocalists. The stage colours transitioned from blue, purple and black, intermittently in orange, red and pink, to orange, red, green and yellow as the song progressed. A wind machine was also used on stage as well as shiny confetti at the end of the song. The Norwegian performance was choreographed by Mattias Carlsson who also created the flashmob dance for the final of the 2010 contest in Oslo. The five backing vocalists on stage with Stella Mwangi were: May Kristin Kaspersen, Øyvind Boye Løvold, Samantha Gurah, Suzanne Sumbundu and Ulrik Engdahl.

At the end of the show, Norway was not announced among the top 10 entries in the first semi-final and therefore failed to qualify to compete in the final. It was later revealed that Norway placed seventeenth in the semi-final, receiving a total of 30 points.

=== Voting ===
Voting during the three shows consisted of 50 percent public televoting and 50 percent from a jury deliberation. The jury consisted of five music industry professionals who were citizens of the country they represent, with their names published before the contest to ensure transparency. This jury was asked to judge each contestant based on: vocal capacity; the stage performance; the song's composition and originality; and the overall impression by the act. In addition, no member of a national jury could be related in any way to any of the competing acts in such a way that they cannot vote impartially and independently. The individual rankings of each jury member were released shortly after the grand final.

Following the release of the full split voting by the EBU after the conclusion of the competition, it was revealed that Norway had placed ninth with the public televote and seventeenth with the jury vote in the first semi-final. In the public vote, Norway scored 56 points, while with the jury vote, Norway scored 29 points.

Below is a breakdown of points awarded to Norway and awarded by Norway in the first semi-final and grand final of the contest. The nation awarded its 12 points to Finland in the semi-final and the final of the contest.

==== Points awarded to Norway ====
Points awarded to Norway (Semi-final 1)
| Score | Country |
|---|---|
| 12 points | |
| 10 points | Iceland |
| 8 points | Finland |
| 7 points | |
| 6 points | |
| 5 points | |
| 4 points | Malta |
| 3 points | |
| 2 points | Portugal; Switzerland |
| 1 point | Albania; Armenia; Azerbaijan; Poland |

==== Points awarded by Norway ====
Points awarded by Norway (Semi-final 1)
| Score | Country |
|---|---|
| 12 points | Finland |
| 10 points | Iceland |
| 8 points | Lithuania |
| 7 points | Serbia |
| 6 points | Switzerland |
| 5 points | Hungary |
| 4 points | Russia |
| 3 points | Poland |
| 2 points | Malta |
| 1 point | Greece |

Points awarded by Norway (Final)
| Score | Country |
|---|---|
| 12 points | Finland |
| 10 points | Sweden |
| 8 points | Iceland |
| 7 points | Denmark |
| 6 points | Serbia |
| 5 points | Germany |
| 4 points | Bosnia and Herzegovina |
| 3 points | Lithuania |
| 2 points | Estonia |
| 1 point | United Kingdom |
