= Babel Fish (band) =

Norwegian pop rock band

- Also known as: Daily Planet
- Origin: Oslo, Norway
- Years active: 1988–2002, 2011
- Labels: Waterfall Productions, Atlantic Records, Warner Music Group
- Members: Tarjei van Ravens; Halvor Holter; Odd Jensen; Simon Malm

Babel Fish are a Norwegian pop rock band from Oslo formed in the late 1980s. The band's members are Tarjei van Ravens (vocals, guitar), Halvor Holter (keyboards, vocals), Odd Jensen (drums), and Simon Malm (bass), the first three as co-founders.

Babel Fish were influenced by artists such as The Beatles, Crowded House, and Kate Bush; they were a classic four-piece and their songs emphasized melodies, vocal harmonies, and catchy guitar riffs, featuring a production which combined a classic sound and some less frequent elements, such as Mellotron and recorded vocal samples.

During the first years of the band, the group worked as a cover band and as studio musicians. The 1996 single "Light of Day" was released under the name Daily Planet, one year after the band had signed up with Waterfall Productions. As they were informed that a Swedish band had already been using that name, the group decided on the current name, inspired by the incredible Babel fish from The Hitchhiker's Guide to the Galaxy books by Douglas Adams.

The band pitched "Light of Day" and "Mania" to international labels, and when Atlantic Records picked them up, their first album Babel Fish was already half finished. The album was released worldwide in 1998. "Mania" became a big success across Europe and was used in a Marlboro commercial and as part of the soundtrack for Dawson's Creek. One year later, however, the band felt sidelined as attention from the record company had diminished, and legal battles ensued to get out of the contract with Atlantic. In the meantime the band had toured much of Europe.

Babel Fish returned to Norway in 2002 after three years abroad, now signed to another Warner subsidiary (Atlantic is also a subsidiary of Warner Music Group), and released the single "Killing Time" and the album Coming Up For Air.

The band won the Spellemannprisen in 1999 for their video of the song "Light of Day".

In 2011, 10 years after their last record came out, they reunited to enter Melodi Grand Prix 2011 with the song "Depend on Me," winning the second Semi-Final.

== Albums ==
- Babel Fish (1998)
- Coming Up For Air (album) (2002)
- Come Closer - The Best of Babel Fish (2011)

== Singles ==
Year	Single	NO	Album
1997	"Mania"	—	Babel Fish
1998	"Light Of Day"	—	Babel Fish
1998	"Turning the Blind Eye"	—	Babel Fish
1998	"Out of the Blue"	—	Babel Fish
2002	"Some Day Soon"	—	Coming Up For Air
2002	"Blah Blah Blah"	—	Coming Up For Air
2002	"Killing Time"	—	Coming Up For Air
2002	"Coming up for Air"	—	Coming Up For Air
2011	"Depend on Me"	20	Come Closer - The Best Of
2011	"Come Closer"	—	Come Closer - The Best Of
