= Sichelle =

- Born: Sichelle Mcmeo Aksum; May 14, 1988 (age 37); Oslo, Norway
- Genres: RnB
- Occupation: Singer
- Years active: 2007–present
- Website: www.sichelle.com

Sichelle Mcmeo Aksum (born 14 May 1988), better known by her stage name Sichelle, is a Norwegian-Grenadian singer. She has released four singles: Fuck deg, Min, Freaky, and Kun for meg. Her debut album was produced by David Eriksen, and was released in 2008.

== Background ==
Sichelle has a Grenadian father and a Norwegian mother. She was born and grew up in Ullevål Hageby in Nordre Aker, but now lives on Hasle. Sichelle attended Elvebakken videregående skole.

== Career ==
Sichelle became well known when she was selected by David Eriksen to sing Fuck deg. It was originally a Danish song performed by Anna David (who also sings the German and English translations), translated into Norwegian by Kai Lofthus. Fuck deg was number 1 on VG-lista for three weeks, and stayed in the chart for 19 weeks. The single was awarded platinum with more than 10,000 copies sold, and was nominated for Hit of the Year (Norwegian: Årets hit) in Spellemannprisen 2008. In October 2007 Sichelle was a guest on Otto Jespersen's Rikets Røst (The Kingdom's Voice), where Sputnik parodied the song. His version had been aimed at the Minister of Cultural Affairs Trond Giske, and it got Giske to promise a Sputnik scholarship. In 2008 her next single, Min, was released, followed in the summer by her third single, Freaky, a 1980s inspired summer tune with a music video in the same genre. Sichelle participated in Melodi Grand Prix 2009 in the third semi-final held in Skien, where she performed the song Left/Right, and in Melodi Grand Prix 2011 in the first semi-final with the song Trenger mer.

== Albums ==
- Sichelle (2008)

=== Singles ===
Year	Single	Peak positions		Certification
Year	Single	NOR	DEN	Certification
2008	"Fuck Deg"	3	-	40.000^ Copies x Platinum
2008	"Min"	22	-	
2009	"Left-Right"	35	-	
2011	"Trenger Mer"	21	56	
