= Dead Man's Shoes (Lucky Bullets album) =

Studio album by The Lucky Bullets
- Released: June 1, 2012
- Recorded: January – March 2012; Except "Fire Below", Recorded Spring 2011
- Genre: Rockabilly
- Length: 53:52
- Label: Grappa
- Producer: Peter Lundell

The Lucky Bullets chronology
Gold Digger (2008)	Dead Man's Shoes (2012)

Singles from Dead Mans Shoes
- 1. "Big Hit" Released: May 14, 2012

Dead Mans Shoes is the debut album by Norwegian rockabilly band The Lucky Bullets.

The album was recorded during Winter/Spring 2012 in Norway, and is produced by Peter Lundell. It consists mainly of western, blues, some rockabilly, some sad tunes, some cabaret, some gunfighter songs. It is currently scheduled for a June 1, 2012 nationwide release, with limited release the day before.

Several of the tracks, including "Name Tattoo" and "Ghost Riders in the Sky", has been part of the band's live catalogue for years.

== Track listing ==
1. Dead Man´s Shoes
2. Devil Behind
3. Name Tattoo
4. Mrs. B. Have
5. Big Hit
6. Mexico Joe
7. The Bosses Daughter
8. Tipsy Lou
9. Fire Below
10. Heavy Load
11. Ghost Riders In The Sky (Stan Jones)
12. The Barrel Of Her Gun

All tracks written by the Lucky Bullets unless stated otherwise.
