= Haba Haba =

2011 song by Stella Mwangi

Single by Stella Mwangi

from the album Kinanda
- Released: 28 January 2011
- Recorded: 2011
- Genre: Pop, dance, hip hop
- Length: 3:00
- Label: Mwangi Records
- Songwriters: Big City; Beyond51; Stella Mwangi

Stella Mwangi singles chronology
"Smile" (2010)	"Haba Haba" (2011)	"Lookie Lookie" (2011)

Eurovision Song Contest 2011 entry
- Country: Norway
- Artist: Stella Mwangi
- Languages: English, Swahili
- Composers: Andreas Sjo Engen; Kjetil Granum Helgesen; Tom Roger Rogstad; Joachim Alte; Marcus Ulstad Nilsen
- Lyricist: Stella Mwangi

Finals performance
- Semi-final result: 17th
- Semi-final points: 30

Entry chronology
- ◄ "My Heart Is Yours" (2010)
- "Stay" (2012) ►

"Haba Haba" (English: "Little by Little", Norwegian: "Steg for steg") is a song performed by Norwegian-Kenyan singer-songwriter Stella Mwangi. It was Norway's entry at the Eurovision Song Contest 2011 and is included on her second studio album Kinanda (2011). The song was chosen using a mix of televoting, jury votes and an audience vote at the Oslo Spektrum during the national Eurovision pre-selection show Melodi Grand Prix on 12 February 2011. It was made available for digital download a day before its initial performance in the third semi-final. "Haba Haba" debuted at number nine in its first week of release, before progressing to number one for four consecutive weeks in the Norwegian singles chart. On 10 May 2011, it competed in the first half of semi-final 1 and performed second on the night.

== Production and song selection ==
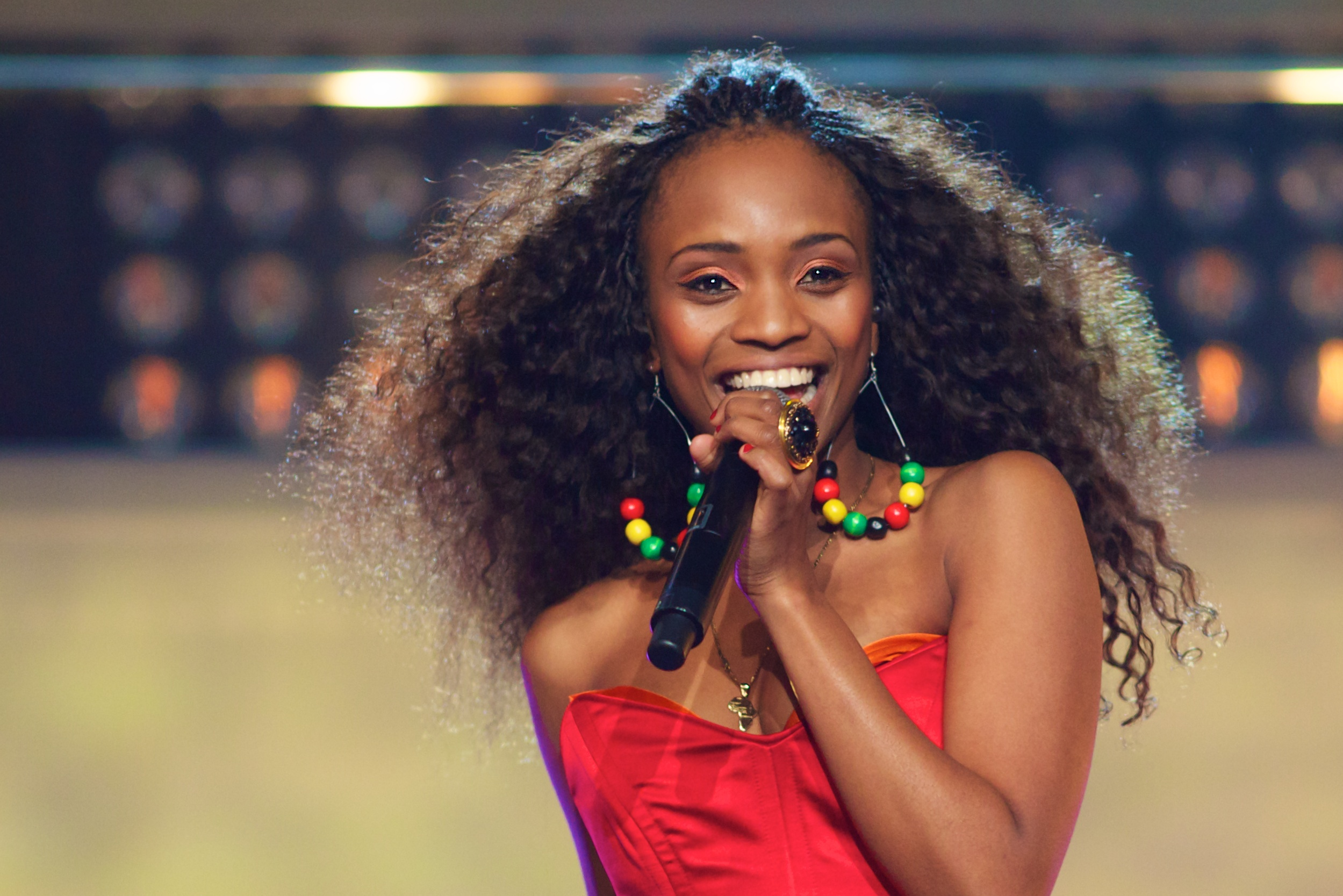
Performance at the final of the Melodi Grand Prix

"Haba Haba" is a pop song with afro-fusion influence, written by Stella and composed by Beyond51 and Big City. The song is bilingual, with lyrics in English and Swahili, marking the first time Swahili or any other East African language was performed at the contest. The lyrics describe how "a journey of a million miles starts with one single step". It is a positive, motivational song about how anyone can be whatever they want to be and tells the story of Mwangi as a young girl listening to her grandmother ("When I’s a little girl my grandma told me/ That I could be just anything that I wanted to"), who teaches her that she should appreciate the smaller things in life ("When I’s a little girl my grandma told me/ That it’s the little things in life that’s gone make me happy"). The song is based upon actual events as Stella once complained to her grandmother that things did not move fast enough, gaining the reply Haba haba, Hujaza Kibaba, which is Swahili for "little by little fills the measure", equivalent to the proverb "slow and steady wins the race".

The song was entered by Mwangi into the 2011 Melodi Grand Prix, the annual selection process for Norway's entry to the Eurovision Song Contest. 21 songs were chosen to go through to the semi-finals by the national broadcaster NRK, with "Haba Haba" performing in the third semi-final on 29 January. It came out of the semi-final in first place, advancing to the final on 12 February. "Haba Haba" progressed with three other songs to the Gold Final, following the elimination of the other finalists. Voting was conducted via a mix of the audience vote at the Oslo Spektrum (where the song beat its nearest rival by more than twice the votes), jury votes split into four different regions (where Stella came second in two regions and first in two, leading to her winning the overall jury vote) and televoting in two different regions (with "Haba Haba" winning in both). "Haba Haba" was the overall winner of the night with a total of 280,217 votes.

== Eurovision Song Contest 2011 ==
In the Eurovision Song Contest semifinal in Düsseldorf on Tuesday 10 May 2011 "Haba Haba" was not among the ten songs which qualified for entrance in the final on Saturday 14 May 2011, despite being placed as one of the favourite songs to win the festival.

== Track listings ==
Digital download
No.	Title	Length
1.	"Haba Haba"	3:00

CD, Single
No.	Title	Length
1.	"Haba Haba (Eurovision 2011 – Norway)"	3:02
2.	"Haba Haba (Instrumental Version)"	3:01
Total length:		6:03

(DVD-V, Promo)
No.	Title	Length
1.	"Haba Haba (Original Version)"	3:00
2.	"Haba Haba (Instrumental)"	3:00
3.	"Haba Haba (Music Video)"	3:16
Total length:		9:16

== Music video ==
A music video was shot by the director Frederic Esnault. The song is presented by Big City Music.

== Charts and certifications ==
=== Peak positions ===
Chart (2017)	Peak position
Iceland (RÚV)	16
Norway (VG-lista)	1

=== Certifications ===
Region	Certification	Certified units/sales
Norway (IFPI Norway)	3× Platinum	30,000^{*}
^{*} Sales figures based on certification alone.

== See also ==
- List of number-one hits in Norway in 2011
