= Helene Bøksle =

Norwegian singer and actress

- Born: 1 April 1981 (age 45); Mandal, Norway
- Genres: Pop, folk
- Occupations: Actor, musician
- Instrument: Singing
- Years active: 1985–present
- Spouse: Espen Tjersland
- Website: www.heleneboksle.no

Helene Margrete Bøksle (born 1 April 1981) is a Norwegian singer and actress.

== Career ==
Bøksle was born in Mandal, Norway. She performs a mixture of traditional Norwegian folk music and popular music. Bøksle has performed with singers such as Bjørn Eidsvåg, David Urwitz and Eurovision 1995 winners Secret Garden. Bøksle entered the Melodi Grand Prix 2011 with the song "Vardlokk".

== Personal life ==
Bøksle is the daughter of singer Ivar Bøksle (1947–2025). She is married to Espen Tjersland and they have a son who was born in 2013.

== Discography ==
=== Albums ===
Year	Album	Peak positions	Certification
Year	Album	NOR	Certification
2006	Elverhøy	–	
2009	Morild	–	
2013	Svalbard	25	

Others

- 2009: Det hev ei rose sprunge (Christmas album) (rereleased in 2010 with 2 bonus tracks)

=== Video game soundtracks ===
- 2008: Age of Conan: Hyborian Adventures

== Filmography ==
- 2003 Frelsesarmeens julekonsert
