= Soraya Arnelas =

Spanish singer

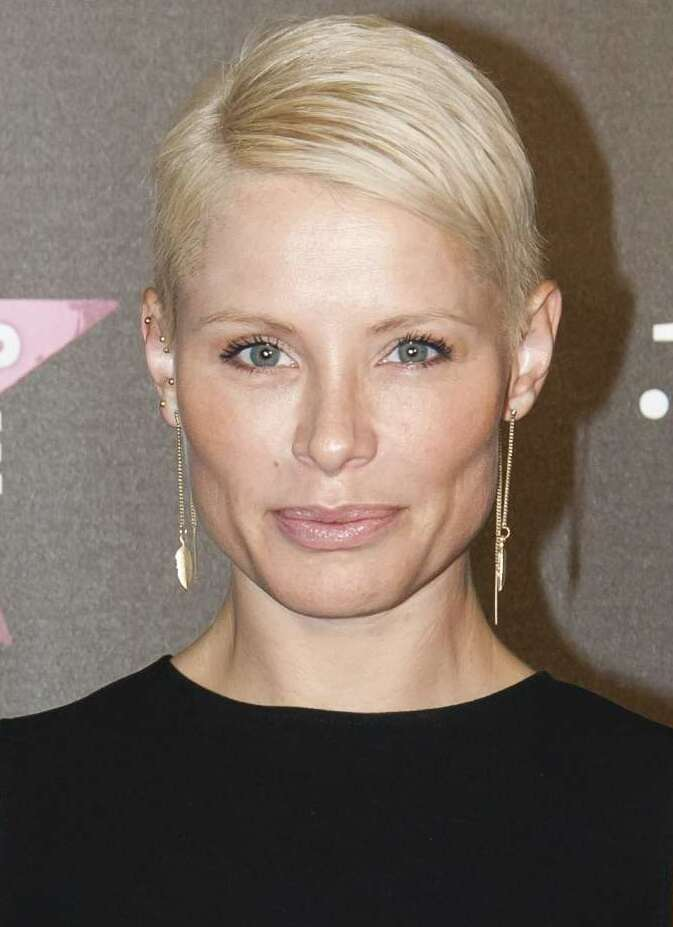
- Soraya in 2015

Background information
- Born: Soraya Arnelas Rubiales; 13 September 1982 (age 43); Valencia de Alcántara (Cáceres), Spain
- Genres: Pop; Eurodance; dance
- Occupation: Singer
- Years active: 2005–present
- Labels: Santander Records (2005); Vale / Universal (2005-2009); Sony Music (2010-present)

Soraya Arnelas Rubiales (Spanish pronunciation: [soˈɾaʝa aɾˈnelas ruˈβjales]; born 13 September 1982), better known mononymously as Soraya, is a Spanish singer. Soraya represented Spain at the Eurovision Song Contest 2009 in Moscow with the song "La noche es para mí", finishing 24rd with 23 points.

== Biography ==
=== Early life ===
Arnelas was born in Valencia de Alcántara, Cáceres, Spain on 13 September 1982. At the age of 11, she left for Madrid. She wanted to study drama but soon started working as an airline stewardess for Iberworld, where she travelled around the world. Apart from her native Spanish, she is also fluent in English and Portuguese.

Arnelas has cited her father's eclectic vinyl collection, featuring New Age and 1980s futuristic dance music, as the primary catalyst for her interest in the genre. During her early career, she spent seven years as a resident vocalist in Ibiza, performing at iconic venues such as Amnesia and Space. She specifically highlights her collaboration with Brian Cross for the "Popstars" parties at Amnesia as a foundational period for her electronic sound.

=== 2005: Operación Triunfo and Corazón De Fuego ===
Soraya participated in the fourth series of the Spanish television series Operación Triunfo in 2005 where she came second overall. Her début album Corazón De Fuego was released on 5 December 2005 produced by Kike Santander. The album got Platinum status.

=== 2006: Ochenta's ===
On 21 November 2006, Soraya released her second album, Ochenta's. It was her first English language album. The first single was a cover of Italian singer RAF's song "Self Control". The remainder of the album was a mixture of 1980s cover versions and new songs. The song reached Gold Status in the Promusicae Digital Songs charts and peaked at number 1 on the Spanish Cadena 100. The second single from Ochenta's was a cover of Spagna's "Call Me". Ochenta's was one of the most successful albums of 2007 in Spain and achieved platinum after many weeks charting in the top ten albums chart.

=== 2007: Dolce Vita ===
Soraya released another album with more covers of 1980s hits titled Dolce Vita. The lead single was "La Dolce Vita". The album includes covers of 1980s hits, including Kylie Minogue's "I Should Be So Lucky", Cyndi Lauper's "Girls Just Want to Have Fun", Eurythmics's "Sweet Dreams (Are Made of This)", Modern Talking's "You're My Heart, You're My Soul" and the lead single, "Dolce Vita", a cover from the Italian singer Ryan Paris. The album shot straight inside the Spanish Top 5 Albums Chart, peaking at No.5, and getting Gold certification in the following weeks.

The album was released in the United Kingdom via iTunes UK and 7digital.

=== 2008: Sin Miedo ===
Sin Miedo was Soraya's fourth released album. Leaving the 1980s covers behind, this album contains 12 original tracks; nine in Spanish and three in English. The album was produced by International DJ DJ Sammy and includes a duo with Kate Ryan (the song Caminaré). The first single of the album was Sin miedo (Without fear).

The album debuted on the Spanish Albums Chart at a low #21, becoming her worst position for a studio album. The album has spent 22 weeks on chart so far. However, the album saw a Top 40 reentry at #32 thanks to a brand new edition of Sin Miedo.

=== 2009: Eurovision and other television projects ===
By the end of 2008, she submitted one of the songs from her latest album, Sin Miedo, "La noche es para mí" to the Spanish preselection for the Eurovision Song Contest 2009, being considered the early favourite to represent the country. She was finally chosen to represent Spain on 28 February 2009. Soraya's Eurovision team consisted of a Swedish songwriting team. She heavily promoted in Sweden in the months leading up to the contest. Being an automatic finalist representing Spain, she performed in the 25th position on Final night, finishing second to last. However, juries and televoters did not vote for the song, and it finished in the twenty fourth place. Arnelas referred to the score as a punishment from Europe, for Radio Television Española's late airing of the second semi-final where Spanish televoters and jury members were to vote.

Previously to her Eurovision experience, she participated in the reality talent contest La Batalla de los Coros, the Spanish version of Clash of the Choirs.

After visiting more than 20 cities, Soraya ended her Sin Miedo Spanish Tour 2009 on 13 September 2009.

=== 2010: Dreamer ===
After leaving her label Vale Music / Universal in late 2010, Soraya signed a record deal with Sony Music to record her fifth studio album Dreamer. The first single to be released from this album was "Live Your Dreams", an electronic-dance-pop song, produced by French DJ Antoine Clamaran. The video for the song was filmed in Paris in March and was released in June 2010.

The single peaked at #8 on the French Club Chart, while it peaked at #13 on the airplay chart and #47 in the download chart. The CD-Single debuted and peaked at #11 in the French Singles Chart, staying a total of 7 weeks into the Top15. It also reached #20 at the Russian Airplay Chart. This was Soraya's first entry in both France and Russian charts. In Belgium it peaked at #51. While in Poland the song reached #16 in the airplay chart. In Spain, the song was #18 in the airplay chart.

The album was released on September 28, 2010, in Spain, reaching number 1 on iTunes the same day it was released. The album peaked at #8 on the Spanish Albums Chart. Dreamer supposed the return of Soraya to the Top10, achieving more success than its predecessor so far. The promotion of the album was supported by a tour through some European countries.

=== 2013: Con Fuego & Universe In Me ===
On 19 February Soraya released an electronic/dance track in co-operation with Aqeel. This was the first song she released along with her own company label, Valentia Records. The song topped the iTunes Spanish Chart, it also made a top thirty (#29) official debut in PROMUSICAE only with downloads but a top ten (#7) in the physical singles chart due to the CD Single release.

=== Personal life ===
Since 2012, Soraya is in a relationship with male model Miguel Ángel Herrera. Soraya gave birth to the couple's first child, Manuela Grace, on 24 February 2017.

== Discography ==
=== Studio albums ===
List of studio albums, with selected details and chart positions
Title	Details	Peak chart positions		Certifications
Title	Details	SPA	SPA DVD	Certifications
Corazón De Fuego	Released: 5 December 2005; Formats: CD, digital download; Label: Vale Music / Santander Records	13	—	SPA: Platinum
Ochenta's	Released: 21 November 2006; Formats: CD, digital download; Label: Vale Music / Universal	5	—	SPA: Platinum
Dolce Vita	Released: 11 September 2007; Formats: CD, digital download; Label: Vale Music / Universal	5	—	SPA: Gold
Sin Miedo	Released: 14 October 2008; Re-released: 5 May 2009; Formats: CD, digital download; Label: Vale Music / Universal	21	—	
Dreamer	Released: 28 September 2010; Re-released: 17 May 2011; Formats: CD, digital download; Label: Sony Music	8	—	
Universe In Me	Released: 11 November 2013; Formats: CD, digital download; Label: Valentia Records	31	—	

=== Live albums ===
List of live albums, with selected details and chart positions
Title	Details	Peak chart positions		Certifications
Title	Details	SPA	SPA DVD	Certifications
Akustika	Released: 29 January 2016; Formats: CD, DVD, digital download; Label: Valentia Records / Universal	97	3	

=== Singles ===
==== As lead artist ====
Year	Title	Peak chart positions						Certification	Album
Year	Title	SPA	SPA DL	SWE	FRA	FRA DL	BEL	Certification	Album
2005	"Mi Mundo Sin Ti"	—	—	—	—	—	—		Corazón De Fuego
2006	"Corazón De Fuego"	—	—	—	—	—	—		Corazón De Fuego
2006	"Self Control"	—	10	—	—	—	—	SPA: Gold	Ochenta's
2007	"Call Me"	—	14	—	—	—	—		Ochenta's
2007	"La Dolce Vita"	—	—	—	—	—	—		Dolce Vita
2008	"Words"	—	—	—	—	—	—		Dolce Vita
2008	"Sin Miedo"	32	—	—	—	—	—		Sin Miedo
2009	"La Noche Es Para Mí"	9	—	25	—	—	—		Sin Miedo
2010	"Live Your Dreams" (feat. Antoine Clamaran)	—	41	—	4	47	51		Dreamer
2010	"Dreamer"	—	—	—	—	—	—		Dreamer
2011	"Stick Shift" (feat. Antoine Clamaran)	—	—	—	—	—	—		Dreamer
2012	"Feeling You" (feat. Antoine Clamaran & Vince M.)	47	—	—	183	—	—		non-album singles
2013	"Con Fuego" (feat. Aqeel)	29	—	—	—	—	—		non-album singles
2013	"Plastic"	25	—	—	—	—	—		Universe In Me
2014	"Neon Lovers / Amantes De Neón"	—	—	—	—	—	—		Universe In Me
2014	"El Huracán" (feat. Vega)	21	—	—	—	—	—		Universe In Me
2015	"You Didn't Do It"	—	16	—	—	—	—		non-album singles
2016	"Long Time"	—	24	—	—	—	—		non-album singles
2017	"El Pretendiente" (feat. Mister Mimon)	—	13	—	—	—	—		non-album singles
2018	"Qué Bonito"	—	18	—	—	—	—		non-album singles
2023	"La Botella"	—	—	—	—	—	—		non-album singles

==== As featured artist ====
Year	Title	Peak chart positions		Certification	Album
Year	Title	SPA	SPA DL	Certification	Album
2006	"No Debería" (with Antonio Romero)	—	—		Antonio Romero
2006	"Fruto Prohibido" (with Santa Fe)	—	—		Fruto Prohibido
2008	"Tonight We Ride / No Digas Que No" (with Kate Ryan)	—	—		Free
2014	"You And I" (with Marien Baker)	—	—		non-album single

== Filmography ==
=== Television ===
Year	Title	Role	Notes
2005	Operación Triunfo	as herself	Contestant, Runner-up
2006	Mira quién baila	as herself	Special episode contestant
2006-2007	El Club de Flo	as herself	Contestant
2009	La Batalla de los Coros	as herself	Choir leader
2009	Eurovisión 2009: El retorno	as herself	Contestant; Winner
2009	Eurovision Song Contest 2009	as herself	Spain's representative
2009-2010	Canta si puedes	as herself	New Year's Eve special episode, contestant
2010	Generación de estrellas	as herself	Judge
2010	Adivina quién viene a cenar esta noche	as herself	Guest appearance
2011	Juntos	as herself	
2011	Tu cara me suena	as herself	Guest performer
2011	Atrapa un millón	as herself	Guest appearance
2012	Pasapalabra	as herself	Guest contestant
2011-2013	Cabaret Olé	as herself	Co-host
2013	Pasapalabra	as herself	Disney special, contestant
2013	Mira quién salta	as herself	Finale episode, guest
2013	Así nos va	as herself	Guest appearance
2013	Tu cara me suena	as herself	Guest performer
2014	¡A bailar!	as herself	Contestant
2014	¡Vaya fauna!	as herself	Judge
2017	Tú sí que sí	as herself	Judge
2017	Tu cara me suena	as herself	Guest performer
2018	Tu cara me suena	as herself	Contestant
2018	Trabajo Temporal	as herself	Contestant
2021	Celebrity Bake Off	as herself	Contestant
2022	Sálvame Mediafest	as herself	Artist and guest Judge
2022	¡Viva la fiesta!	as herself	Guest artist
2023	Drag Race España	as herself	Guest judge
2025	MasterChef Celebrity	as herself	Contestant

Preceded by Rodolfo Chikilicuatre with "Baila el Chiki-chiki"	Spain in the Eurovision Song Contest; 2009	Succeeded by Daniel Diges with "Algo pequeñito"
