= Baila el Chiki-chiki =

2008 song by Rodolfo Chikilicuatre

Single by Rodolfo Chikilicuatre
- Language: Spanish, English
- Genre: Reggaeton; novelty
- Length: 2:52
- Songwriters: "Rodolfo Chikilicuatre and Friends"

Eurovision Song Contest 2008 entry
- Country: Spain
- Artist: David Fernández Ortiz
- As: Rodolfo Chikilicuatre
- With: Disco, Gráfica
- Languages: Spanish, English
- Composers: "Rodolfo Chikilicuatre and Friends"
- Lyricists: "Rodolfo Chikilicuatre and Friends"

Finals performance
- Final result: 16th
- Final points: 55

Entry chronology
- ◄ "I Love You Mi Vida" (2007)
- "La noche es para mí" (2009) ►

Official performance video
- "Baila el Chiki-chiki" (final) on YouTube

"Baila el Chiki-chiki" (Spanish pronunciation: [ˈbajla el ˈtʃiki ˈtʃiki]; "Dance the Chiki-chiki") is a novelty song recorded by Rodolfo Chikilicuatre. It represented Spain in the Eurovision Song Contest 2008, placing sixteenth.

== Background ==
=== Conception ===
Rodolfo Chikilicuatre was a comedic character –performed by comedian David Fernández– on the late-night talk show Buenafuente on La Sexta. He was first introduced in the show as an improvisational act. The show's team decided to have its scriptwriters and musicians write a song for him. They wrote "Baila el Chiki-chiki", a parody of reggaeton music filled with jokes and references to the ¿Por qué no te callas? incident between Venezuelan president Hugo Chávez, the king of Spain Juan Carlos I and Spanish prime minister José Luis Rodríguez Zapatero. Andreu Buenafuente –the show's host and director– decided to enter the song into the Spanish selection process for the Eurovision Song Contest 2008.

=== Selection ===
Between 22 January and 13 February 2008, Radiotelevisión Española (RTVE) opened an online submission process for artists to upload their entries for the 53rd edition of the Eurovision Song Contest. Between 16 and 25 February 2008, an online vote was opened among the entries received to classify the top five for the Spanish national final. "Baila el Chiki-chiki" –that was heavily promoted on Buenafuente– ended up being selected with the highest number of votes.

On 8 March 2008, the televised national final Salvemos Eurovisión was aired on La 1 of Televisión Española. "Baila el Chiki-chiki" won the competition so it became the Spanish entry for Eurovision.

For the song to participate in Eurovision, its lyrics had to be changed due to the political allusions, as the contest rules does not allow political remarks in any song in the competition. Its final version featured allusions to some prominent Spanish figures, including Pau Gasol, Fernando Alonso, Javier Bardem, Antonio Banderas, and Pedro Almodóvar, as well as, the 1995 Spanish hit "La Macarena", Michael Jackson and RoboCop. The official video with the final version of the song premiered on 14 March 2008 on RTVE's website.

=== Eurovision final ===
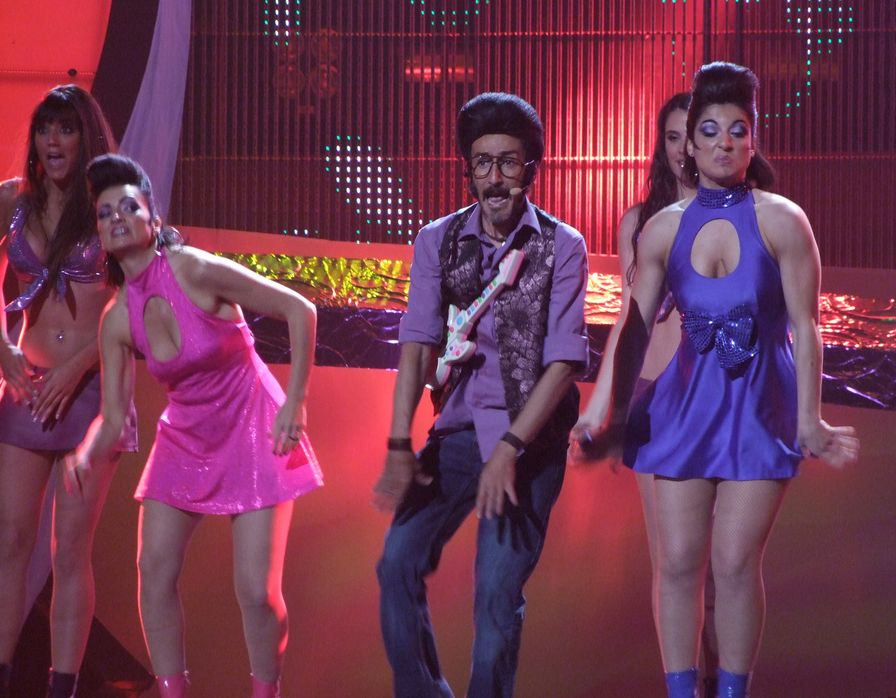
Chikilicuatre with Disco (right) and Gráfica (left) at Eurovision .

On 24 May 2008, the Eurovision Song Contest grand final was held at the Belgrade Arena in Belgrade hosted by Radio Television of Serbia (RTS), and broadcast live throughout the continent. Chikilicuatre performed "Baila el Chiki-chiki" twenty-second on the night following Greece's "Secret Combination" by Kalomira and preceding Serbia's "Oro" by Jelena Tomašević and Bora Dugić.

He was accompanied on stage by Disco –played by Alejandra Jiménez– and Gráfica –Silvia Abril–, two comedic dancers that also accompanied him in the national final. Gráfica danced clumsily without knowing the basic dance steps. Another three dancers –Leticia Martín, María Ángeles Mas and Cecilia López–, that were chosen through the special casting show Dansin Chiki Chiki, joined them.

At the close of voting, "Baila el Chiki-chiki" received 55 points, placing sixteenth in a field of twenty-five.

=== Aftermath ===
"Baila el Chiki-Chiki" has also been performed by Chikilicuatre alongside popular figures such as King África, Tata Golosa, and Dustin the Turkey, among others.

== Chart history ==
=== Weekly charts ===
Chart (2008)	Peak position	Certification
France (SNEP)	20	—
Greece (Digital Singles Chart)	1	—
Spain (Download Chart)	1	3× Platinum
Spain (Ringtones Chart)	1	4× Platinum
Sweden (Sverigetopplistan)	12	—

=== Year-end charts ===
Chart (2008)	Position
Spain (PROMUSICAE)	4
