= Ochenta's =

Studio album by Soraya Arnelas
- Released: November 21, 2006
- Recorded: 2006
- Genre: Pop

Soraya Arnelas chronology
Corazón De Fuego (2005)	Ochenta's (2006)	La Dolce Vita (2007)

Ochenta's is the name of Soraya Arnelas's second studio album, released in Spain on November 21, 2006, under the Vale Music label.

== Track listing ==
1. "Self Control"
2. "Call Me"
3. "Don't Go"
4. "High Energy"
5. "Because the Night"
6. "Gonna Get Along Without You Now"
7. "Don't You Want Me"
8. "Send Me an Angel"
9. "Face to Face"
10. "Just Can't Get Enough"
11. "Tarzan Boy"

== Chart performance ==
Chart	Peak	Certification	Sales
Promusicae	5	Platinum	80,000+

== Release history ==
Country	Release date
Spain	November 21, 2006
