= The Lucky Bullets =

Norwegian rockabilly band

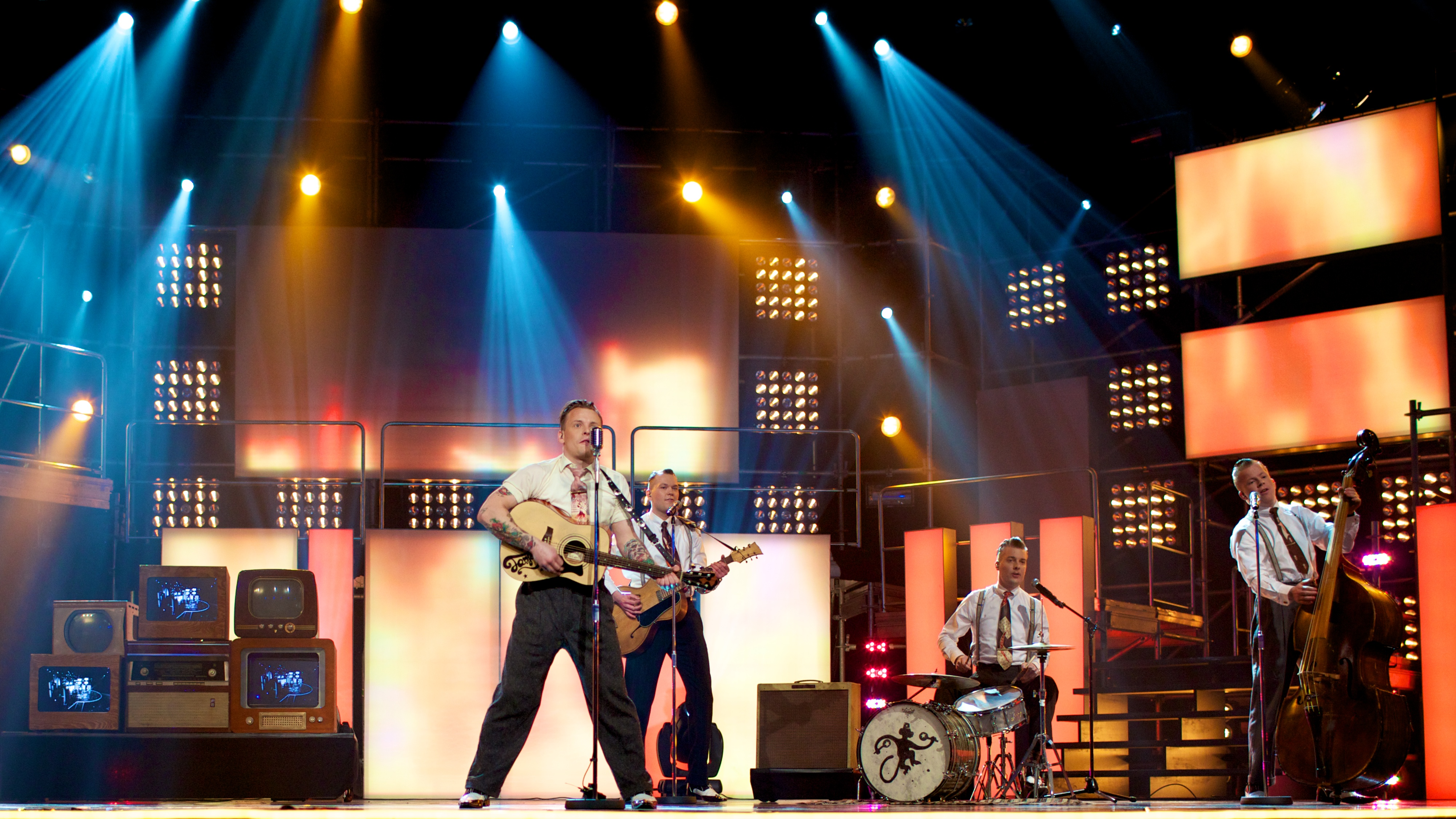
- The Lucky Bullets in 2011

Background information
- Origin: Oslo, Norway
- Genres: Rock and roll, rockabilly
- Years active: 2006–present
- Label: Grappa Records (2012 - )
- Members: Tank Harvey (Knud Kleppe); Butch Comet (Even Lundqvist); Ace Dynamite (Stian Nybru); Jimmy Dapper (Svein Åge Lillehamre)
- Website: Official

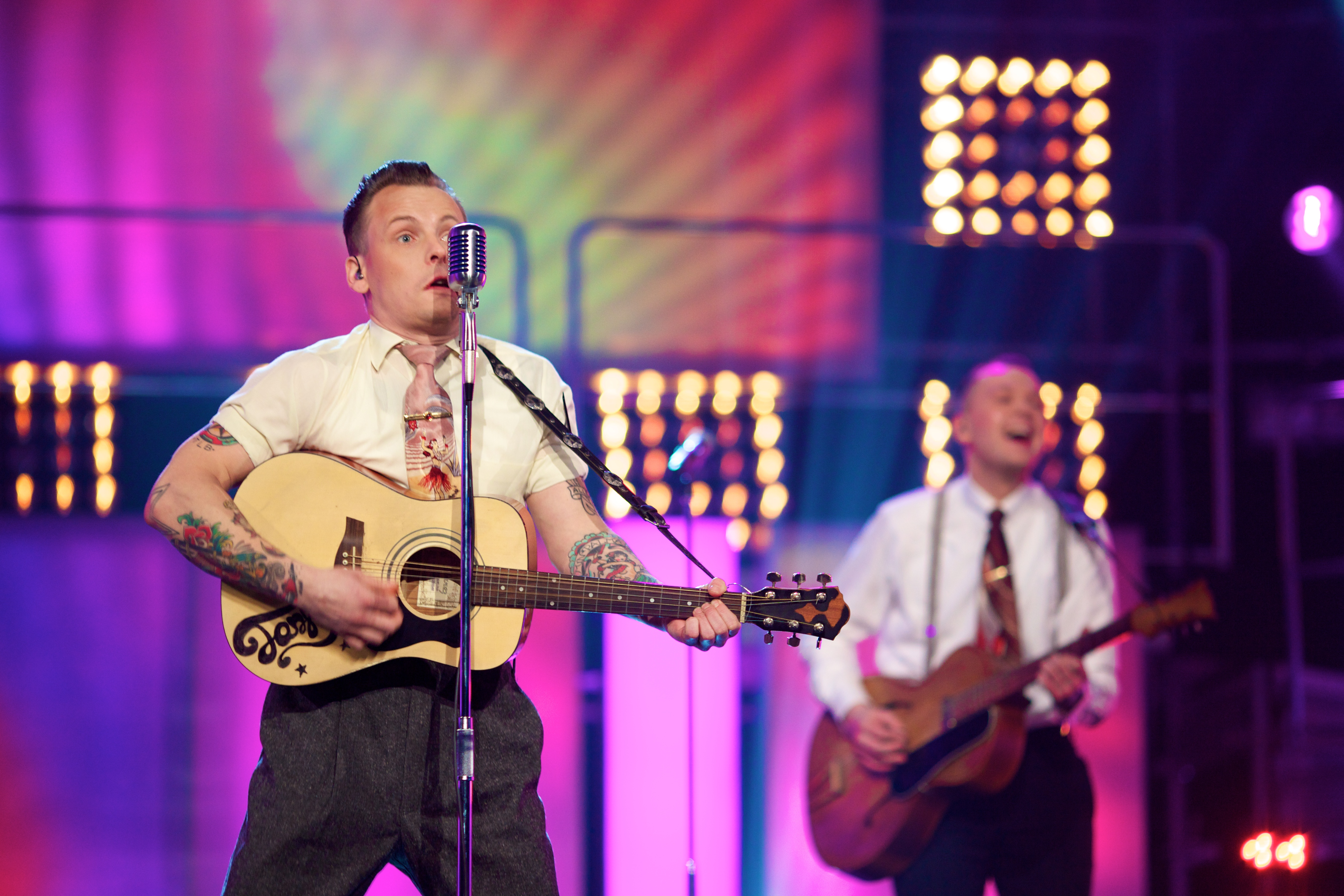
The Lucky Bullets

The Lucky Bullets is a Norwegian rockabilly band, formed in 2006. They first came to fame when they performed on the main stage at by:Larm 2008. Three years later they competed in the Norwegian finals of the Eurovision Song Contest, where they reached the finals and finished 3rd. Their first album, Dead Mans Shoes, was released in 2012.

== History ==
The group was formed in Oslo in 2006, when three acquaintances, Kleppe, Nybru and Lillehamre, formed a rockabilly band after realizing they shared a passion for 50s music. After a round of drinks and discussion, they came up with the name the Lucky Bullets. They soon began writing and performing their own songs, playing clubs and minor arenas in the Eastern part of the country. In 2008 the line-up was completed with guitarist Even Lundqvist. That same year they performed to rave reviews at by:Larm, where they played the main stage.

In 2011, the group participated in the third semi-final of the 2011 Melodi Grand Prix, where they finished third, qualifying them for the "Last Chance round", where they were one of two acts to receive spots for the finals. They finished third in the final.

On March 8, 2012, the band announced on their Facebook page that they had signed a record contract with Grappa Records for a June 2012 release of their first full-length album. Later, it was announced that the album would be mixed and produced by Peter Lundell, and is titled Dead Mans Shoes, currently slated for a June 1, 2012 release. The album will feature eleven newly recorded tracks, plus the 2011 hit single Fire Below.

In May 2013, the band announced their next single, "Cry of the Wild Goose", to be released August 24, 2013 on 7" vinyl and digitally.

== Members ==
"Tank Harvey" - Knud Kleppe - guitars and vocals (2006 - )
"Butch Comet" - Even Lundquist - lead guitars and vocals (2008 - )
"Ace Dynamite" - Stian Nybru - double bass and vocals (2006 - )
"Jimmy Dapper" - Svein Åge Lillehamre - drums and percussion (2006 - )

== Releases ==
=== Albums ===
- 2008: "Gold Digger" - CD EP
- 2012: "Dead Mans Shoes" - CD, vinyl and digital

=== Singles ===
- 2007: "Big Fat Dolly" - 45 rpm 7" vinyl single
- 2011: "Fire Below" - digital exclusive
- 2012: "Saturday Night" - digital and 45 rpm 7" vinyl single
- 2013: "Cry of the Wild Goose" - digital and 45 rpm 7" vinyl single
