= José Luis Uribarri =

Spanish television presenter (1936–2012)

- Born: José Luis Uribarri Grenouillou; 9 August 1936; Ávila, Spain
- Died: 23 July 2012 (aged 75); Madrid, Spain
- Occupations: Broadcaster; Music journalist
- Spouses: Alicia Mansberger Martín (m. 1964–1985) Amparo Losada Díaz (m. 1986–2012)
- Children: Alicia (born 1965); Susana (born 1967); Laura (born 1988)

José Luis Uribarri Grenouillou (9 August 1936 – 23 July 2012) was a Spanish broadcaster and music journalist for Televisión Española (TVE). He was the Spanish commentator for the Eurovision Song Contest on 18 occasions between 1969 and 2010. He was widely known as La voz de Eurovisión (The Voice of Eurovision) in Spain.

== Biography ==
=== Early career ===
Uribarri was born in Ávila. After finishing school at Marist school in Palencia, he went on to study Law but left in 1956 to work as a continuity presenter for Radio Juventud, and then for Radio Intercontinental. At Radio Intercontinental he started to write scripts for music programmes.

He started on Televisión Española (TVE) in 1958 as a contestant on the talent show Caras nuevas, hosted by Blanca Álvarez. He was hired by TVE and established himself as one of the most popular presenters in Spain. He was a Telediario news anchor in 1961–62; presented Salto a la fama between 1961 and 1965; and won a Premios Ondas in 1966.

He directed and presented the four annual editions of Musical Mallorca between 1975 and 1978. One of his most successful shows was the musical programme Aplauso, which he directed and hosted between 1978 and 1983. The show was considered one of the most important showcases of contemporary music in Spain. He was also the TVE commentator for the OTI Festival on numerous occasions.

Between 1991 and 1996, Uribarri was the main continuity presenter for TVE 1 and TVE 2.

=== Eurovision Song Contest ===
In 1968, Spain won the Eurovision Song Contest for the first time in London with "La, la, la" by Massiel, which meant TVE would host the 1969 edition. The regular TVE commentator until then was Federico Gallo, but Uribarri took over commentator duties which he continued at the 1970 edition. He returned as the TVE commentator between the 1974 and 1976 contests. After a hiatus between 1977 and 1991, he returned as commentator in 1992 and continued in the job until 2003, cementing his status as the commentator most associated with the show. He returned for the 2008 and 2010 contests.

Uribarri became known for his habit of trying to predict the voting for each country, using his analysis and knowledge of previous contests. He was right more often than he was wrong, and even after his departure from TVE he would often get asked by the media to assess Spain's chances at Eurovision that year.

Other than the contest itself, Uribarri presented the Spanish national final Pasaporte a Dublín for the 1971 contest. In 1998, he directed and wrote the four-episode documentary series Eurovisión Siglo XX, which focused on the history of Eurovision. In 2000 and 2001, he directed the Spanish national finals Eurocanción 2000 and Eurocanción 2001. He also made appearances as a member of the jury in several national finals. In 2008, he appeared on the Eurovision-themed chat show Salvemos Eurovisión, broadcast on 8 March 2008 and on the special Dansin Chiki Chiki, where Rodolfo Chikilicuatre's back-up dancers were decided. Uribarri was pessimistic about Chikilacuatre's act and his chances, but he eventually accepted Chikilacuatre's success after the final, to the latter's delight. In 2009, he headed the jury at the national final Eurovisión 2009: El retorno, and was also a member of the Spanish jury at the international contest.

=== Other media ===
Uribarri made inroads into the film world in the 1960s, with roles in: José Luis Sáenz de Heredia's Television Stories, in which he played himself; La chica de los anuncios; A 45 revoluciones por minuto, ¿Por qué pecamos a los cuarenta?, and El astronauta. In the 1970s he had a side career as head of PR for a bank and headed the music page for the ¡Hola! magazine.

=== Later career ===
In November 2010 Uribarri began working for Catholic-oriented television channel 13 TV hosting the film programme Nuestro Cine, evaluating films by Catholic values. As a result, it was confirmed on 8 February 2011 that Uribarri would not return to provide the Spanish commentary for the Eurovision Song Contest 2011, as he stated that he wanted to concentrate on his projects for 13 TV. It was announced on 2 March of that year that José María Íñigo would replace Uribarri as commentator.

== Death ==
Uribarri suffered a cerebral hemorrhage on 18 July 2012. He died on 23 July 2012 in a hospital in Madrid. He was 75.

It was reported after his death that a disagreement had occurred over his will, when Amparo Losada, Uribarri's second wife, accused Alicia and Susana, his children from his first marriage, of stealing his testament, which was found in a bag belonging to Laura, Uribarri and Losada's daughter.

== Personal life ==
His first wife was Alicia Mansberger Martín, whom he married in 1964. They had two children, Alicia and Susana, before their separation in 1982. Susana continues in the TV industry as the head of production company Alfin Producciones. He remarried to Amparo Losada Díaz in 1986 and had one child, Laura.
