= Kinanda =

Studio album by Stella Mwangi
- Released: 10 June 2011
- Recorded: 2010–11
- Genre: Pop
- Label: EMI Records / Big City Music

Stella Mwangi chronology
Living for Music (2008)	Kinanda (2011)

Singles from Kinanda
- 1. "Smile" Released: 2010; 2. "Haba Haba" Released: 28 February 2011; 3. "Lookie Lookie" Released: 27 May 2011; 4. "Take My Time" Released: 24 June 2011; 5. "Hula Hoop" Released: 11 November 2011

Kinanda is the second studio album by Norwegian-Kenyan singer Stella Mwangi, released on 10 June 2011 in Norway. It peaked at number 15 on the Norwegian Albums Chart.

== Singles ==
- "Smile" was released as the first single in 2010.
- "Haba Haba" was released as the second single on 28 February 2011. Stella Mwangi performed the song in the Eurovision Song Contest 2011 representing Norway in the contest and in the Semi-final held in Düsseldorf, Germany scored 30 points and finished 17th, Failing to qualify for the final. It reached number 1 on the Norwegian Singles Chart.
- "Lookie Lookie" was released as the third single on 27 May 2011.
- "Take My Time" was released as the fourth single on 24 June 2011.
- "Hula Hoop" was released as the fifth single on 11 November 2011.

== Track listing ==
No.	Title	Length
1.	"Haba Haba"	2:59
2.	"Take My Time"	3:38
3.	"Hula Hoop" (featuring Mohombi)	3:31
4.	"Dance in the Rain"	3:26
5.	"Hello"	3:41
6.	"Lookie Lookie"	3:42
7.	"Copy My Swang"	2:43
8.	"Next Flight" (featuring Munchie)	3:25
9.	"Smile"	3:35
10.	"Hakuna Matata"	3:26
11.	"Throw Me a Ladder" (featuring J Rice)	3:38
12.	"Purse"	3:57

== Chart performance ==
Chart (2011)	Peak position
Norwegian Albums Chart	15

== Release history ==
Country	Date	Format	Label
Norway	June 10, 2011	CD, Digital download	EMI Records
