= Ivar Bøksle =

Norwegian singer and accordionist (1947–2025)

Ivar Toralv Bøksle (29 April 1947 – 20 September 2025) was a Norwegian singer and accordionist.

== Early life and career ==
Bøksle was born in Kristiansand on 29 April 1947. Together with his younger brother Eivind Bøksle, he made his recording debut in 1972 with the album Viser fra Sørlandet, and the duo also released two other albums over the years. He released an album with Jens Graasvoll, called Dudelidelei, in 1992. He made his recording debut as a solo artist in 2001 with Sange fra min ø, and in 2007 a second album Øen was released.

== Personal life and death ==
Ivar Bøksle was the father of singer and actress Helene Bøksle and author Camilla Bøksle.

Bøksle was diagnosed with Alzheimer's disease in 2019. He died on 20 September 2025, at the age of 78.
