= Sin miedo =

Studio album by Soraya
- Released: 14 October 2008
- Recorded: 2008
- Genre: Pop; R&B; dance-pop; pop rock; Europop
- Length: 44:52
- Label: Vale Music/Universal
- Producer: DJ Sammy; Ten/Ten Brothers

Soraya chronology
La dolce vita (2007)	Sin miedo (2008)	Dreamer (2010)

Singles from Sin miedo
- 1. "Sin miedo" Released: 17 November 2008; 2. "La noche es para mí" Released: 12 January 2009; 3. "Caminaré (feat. Kate Ryan)" Released: Cancelled

Sin miedo (meaning Without Fear) is the fourth studio album by Spanish singer Soraya.

== Album information ==
It is the album in which she has been more involved with, and the one which defines more her personal style, after two albums of covers. She even co-writes one of the songs, "Give Me Your Love"

There are 12 songs on this album: 10 original songs in Spanish and two covers in English: "Rebound" by the German group Monrose and Love Is All Around, originally by the Swedish singer Agnes.

The lead single off the album is Sin miedo. The second single, "La noche es para mí" was chosen as the Spanish entry in the Eurovision Song Contest 2009. It peaked in Spain at #9, being the highest position of a single by Soraya. It also charted in Sweden.

There is a duet with Kate Ryan called Caminaré, which has been chosen as the third single. However, controversy came in late June 2009, when her label, Vale Music, did not want to pay the video for her single "Caminaré". Soraya stated on her official facebook that she will make the video on her own, without the support of Vale Music". However, as of September 2009, no news about the release of the video has been made. As well, the single release has been cancelled by her label.

The album is produced by DJ Sammy and the Ten brothers.

== Track listing ==
1. Sin miedo – 3:56
2. Para ti – 3:55
3. No siento - 3:44
4. Duele - 3:29
5. La noche es para mí - 3:00
6. Caminaré (with Kate Ryan) - 3:29
7. Piel contra piel - 4:05
8. Give Me Your Love - 3:41
9. Uno en un millón - 3:16
10. Ángel caído - 4:23
11. Rebound - 3:39
12. Love Is All Around - 3:21

Deluxe Edition

13. "La noche es para mí (DeepCentral Remix)" - 3:23
14. "Hasta el final" - 4:10

== Chart performance ==
The album debuted and peaked at #21, before slipping down the Spanish Albums Chart. The album was less successful than its predecessors, but plans to release the album throughout Europe still scheduled by her label, Universal, since Soraya has been chosen to represent Spain in the Eurovision Song Contest 2009 in Moscow.

The album sold, in excess, 16,000 copies in Spain, being her worst charting and selling album to date. This was due to the poor promotion given to the album on TV and music stations, and due to the release of the single "Sin miedo" two weeks after the release of the album. The first single charted at #32 on the Spanish Singles Chart.

The second single, "La noche es para mí," has peaked at #9 on the Spanish Singles Chart, and peaked at #25 on the Swedish Singles Chart. It is Soraya's most successful single so far.

Chart	Peak	Certification	Sales
Promusicae	21	—	+16,000

== Release history ==
Country	Release date	Edition
Spain	October 14, 2008	CD
Spain	May 5, 2009	CD + DVD
