= Stella Mwangi =

Kenyan-Norwegian singer (born 1986)

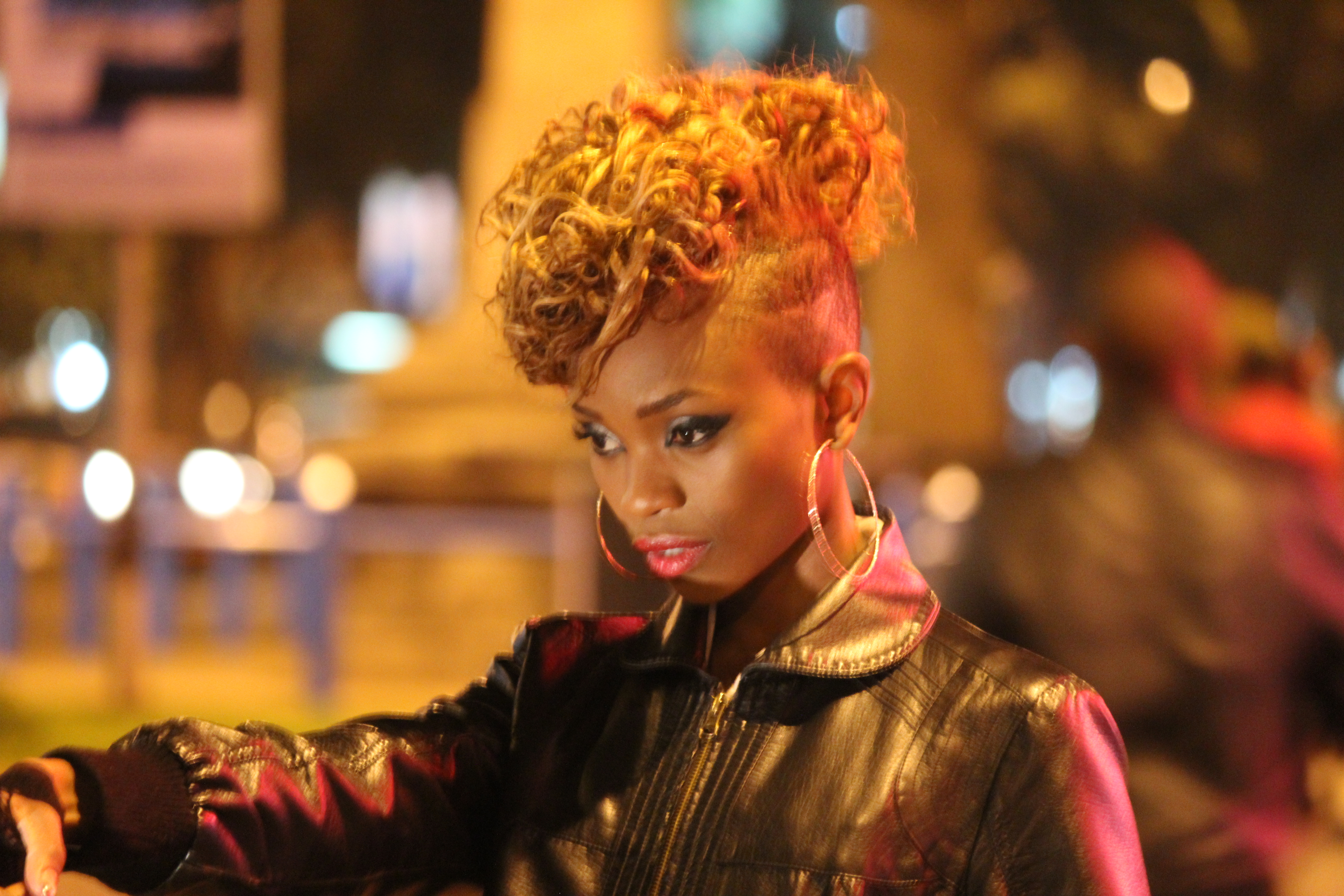
- Stella Mwangi at a video shoot in Nairobi, June 2012

Background information
- Also known as: Stella, STL
- Born: Stella Nyambura Mwangi; 1 September 1986 (age 40); Nairobi, Kenya
- Origin: Eidsvoll, Norway
- Genres: Pop, hip hop, dance, trap, electro house
- Occupations: Singer; songwriter; rapper
- Years active: 2007 - present
- Labels: MTG; Mwangi; Big City; EMI; Ubiloud
- Website: stellamwangi.com

Stella Nyambura Mwangi (born 1 September 1986) is a Kenyan-Norwegian singer, rapper, and songwriter. Her work has been used in films such as American Pie Presents: The Naked Mile and Save the Last Dance 2, and also in TV-series such as CSI: NY, Scrubs and Survival of The Thickest. She represented Norway in the Eurovision Song Contest 2011 in Düsseldorf with the song "Haba Haba".

== Early and personal life ==
Stella was born in Murang'a in the Central Province of Kenya in 1986 and spent her first 5 years there before her family moved to Eidsvoll in Norway in 1991. She started to practice playing music when she was eight years old. She also plays the piano. Her father made sure she and her siblings learned the Gikuyu language and Swahili even far away from home. He used cultural music and poetry to teach them the languages and this inspired Stella's music and her connection to the Kenyan culture.

In 2011, Stella got engaged to her long-time boyfriend Tom Roger Rogstad. Mwangi's father was killed in a hit-and-run accident in February 2012.

== Eurovision Song Contest 2011 ==
In 2011, Mwangi participated in the Norwegian national selection Melodi Grand Prix 2011 to represent Norway in the Eurovision Song Contest 2011, which was held in Düsseldorf, Germany. On 12 February 2011, Mwangi emerged as the winner.

On 10 May, she represented Norway at the Eurovision Song Contest with the song "Haba Haba" but failed to qualify for the Eurovision final, despite being one of the big favourites of the contest.

Mwangi first topped the official singles chart in Norway in week 6, 2011 with her winning song "Haba Haba".

== Melodi Grand Prix 2018 ==
Stella competed in the Melodi Grand Prix for the chance to represent Norway in the Eurovision Song Contest 2018 along with Alexandra Rotan with the song You Got Me. They placed third overall. Rotan would subsequently go onto represent Norway a year later at the Eurovision Song Contest 2019 as part of the group Keiino.

== Discography ==
=== Albums ===
Album title	Album details	Peak chart positions
Album title	Album details	NOR
Living for Music	Released: 20 October 2008; Label: MTG Productions; Formats: Digital download, streaming	—
Kinanda	Released: 10 June 2011; Label: EMI Norway; Formats: Digital download, streaming	15
Eyes Off Me	Released: 9 September 2021; Label: Recurrent Records / Position Music; Formats: Digital download, streaming	—
Icon	Released: 16 June 2022; Label: Choicetracks Inc. / Position Music; Formats: Digital download, streaming	—
"—" denotes an album that did not chart or was not released.

=== Extended plays ===
Title	Details
Stella Mwangi	Released: 23 March 2017; Label: Position Music; Formats: Digital download, streaming
No Games	Released: 19 August 2019; Label: Recurrent Records / Position Music; Formats: Digital download, streaming

=== Singles ===
Year	Title	Peak chart positions		Album or EP
Year	Title	NOR	ZAF	Album or EP
"Take It Back"	2007	—	—	Living for Music
"The Dreamer"	2008	—	—	Living for Music
"Makelele Remix"	2008	—	—	Living for Music
"Smile"	2010	—	—	Living for Music
"Haba Haba"	2011	1	4	Kinanda
"Lookie Lookie"	2011	—	—	Kinanda
"Take My Time" (featuring Mohombi)	2011	—	—	Kinanda
"Hula Hoop"	2011	—	—	Kinanda
"Bad As I Wanna Be"	2012	—	—	Non-album singles
"Shut It Down"	2013	—	—	Non-album singles
"Bouncer Ræva"	2014	—	—	Non-album singles
"Stella Stella Stella"	2014	—	—	Non-album singles
"Koolio"	2014	—	—	Non-album singles
"Biashara" (featuring Kristoff and Khaligraph Jones)	2014	—	—	Non-album singles
"Chukua Hatua"	2015	—	—	Non-album singles
"Obe Baba" (featuring Rajville (Rajiv Okemwa)	2015	—	—	Non-album singles
"Identifyourself"	2016	—	—	
"Big Girl"	2016	—	—	Stella Mwangi
"Ready to Pop"	2017	—	—	Non-album singles
"Kuchizi"	2017	—	—	Non-album singles
"Not Your Ordinary"	2018	—	—	No Games
"You Got Me" (with Alexandra Rotan)	2018	—	—	Non-album singles
"10 Toes"	2018	—	—	Non-album singles
"F.I.L." (with Alexandra Rotan)	2018	—	—	Non-album singles
"Repeat"	2018	—	—	No Games
"So What"	2019	—	—	No Games
"Number 1" (with Victoria Kimani)	2019	—	—	Non-album singles
"Ma Itù"	2019	—	—	Non-album singles
"In the Spot" (with JS16)	2020	—	—	Non-album singles
"Long Way Coming" (with Aaron Salovaara)	2020	—	—	Non-album singles
"Eyes Off Me"	2021	—	—	Eyes Off Me
"Watch" (with Valorant)	2021	—	—	Non-album single
"Naughty"	2021	—	—	Eyes Off Me
"Icon"	2022	—	—	Icon
"I Do What I Want"	2022	—	—	Icon
"Talk That Talk"	2024	—	—	Non-album single
"—" denotes a single that did not chart or was not released.

Awards and achievements
Preceded by Didrik Solli-Tangen	Norway in the Eurovision Song Contest; 2011	Succeeded by Tooji
