= Sie Gubba =

Norwegian country rock band

Sie Gubba is a Norwegian country rock band originating from Ålen in Holtålen Municipality in Sør-Trøndelag county. The band was established in 1995.

== Members ==
The line-up of the band has seen various changes:

Present line-up

- Magne Almås – electric guitar, backing vocals (1995–present)
- Tommy Folstadli - drums (2005-2010, 2014–present)
- Petter Øien – acoustic guitar, vocals (2005–present)
- Leif Arne Olaussen – bass (2010–present)
- Morten Hølås – violin, backing vocals (2009–present)
- Reidulf Wormdal – keyboards, accordion (2000-2001 2009–present)

Earlier members

- John Ole Morken - violin (1995-1999)
- Tommy Holden - keyboards, accordion (1998-2000)
- Svein Ingebrigt Findland - drums (1995-2000)
- Bjørn Lillevold - drums (2000-2004)
- Ola Dragmyrhaug - guitar, accordion, tambourine (1995-2009)
- Ingar Engan - violin, guitar (1999-2009)
- Hans Skogaas - bass, vocals (1995-2009)
- Tore Dalsaune - bass (2009)
- Håvard Soknes - drums (2010-2014)

== Discography ==
=== Albums ===
Studio albums

Year	Album	Peak positions
Year	Album	NOR
1998	Jakta ti alle fjell	
2000	Lynx'n	
2002	Lørdag e'det fæst	
2003	Bykar	
2006	Sie Gubba	
2009	Hemafrå	8
2011	Alt du vil ha	1
2014	Veien vi ska gå	9

Live albums

Year	Album	Peak positions
Year	Album	NOR
2008	Sånn e livet - live 10 år	4
2015	Live - 20 år	32

=== DVDs / Music videos ===
- 2003: BMW'n
- 2005; Fjellrypa
- 2006: Sommerfestival
- 2006: Sånn e livet
- 2008: Sånn e livet – live DVD
- 2009: Den gamle låven
- 2011: Så kom du
- 2014; Æ og du
- 2014: Gammel tid
