= Carina Dahl =

Norwegian singer

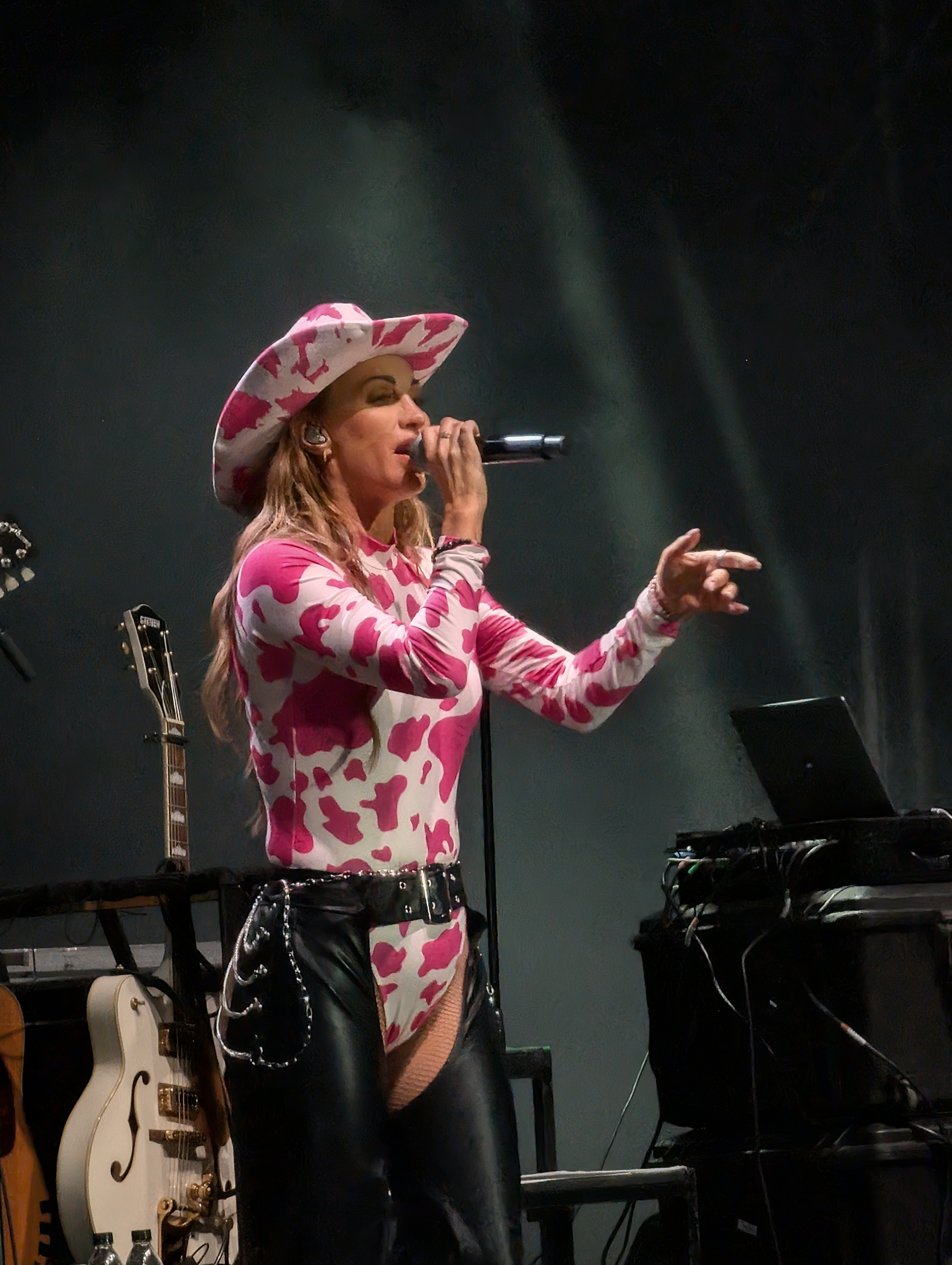
- Dahl in 2026.

Background information
- Born: 15 August 1985 (age 41)
- Origin: Trondheim, Norway
- Genres: Pop
- Occupation: Singer
- Years active: 2006–present
- Label: daWorks
- Website: carinadahl.no

Carina Jeanette Dahl (born 15 August 1985) is a Norwegian pop singer.

== Biography ==
Dahl participated in Big Brother 2006, a joint program shared by broadcasters in Sweden and Norway. She was the last housemate to be voted off before the finale, spending a total of 107 days in the house. Dahl has for many years worked as a glamour model and was voted "Årets gatebilbabe" in 2005 in Norway.

She has since established herself in Norway as a singer, with the label Stargate producing several of her songs, and has performed at events including the Norway Rock Festival. She reached the first semi-final of the Melodi Grand Prix 2011, the competition to select an act to represent Norway in the Eurovision Song Contest 2011 in Germany, with a song titled "Guns & Boys", but failed to progress further in the contest.

Dahl lived in Sweden for five years, where she worked with the record company TMC Entertainment, and in 2010 she released her first album Hot Child. She moved back to Norway in 2012, and that autumn she participated in the reality show Tigerstaden aired on TV2 Bliss. In September 2012 her first single NLTO (Not Like the Others) was released by the record company daWorks Records.

Dahl is the daughter of Diesel Dahl, a member of the heavy metal band TNT. Carina Dahl participated for a second time in the Norwegian national selection for Eurovision Song Contest 2013 in Malmö with the song "Sleepwalking". She competed a third time in the Norwegian national selection for Eurovision Song Contest 2019 in Tel Aviv with the song "Hold Me Down".

== Discography ==
=== Studio albums ===
- Hot Child (2010, TMC)
- Hurricane Lover – Acoustic Sessions (2015, daWorks)

=== EPs ===
- Screw Remixes (2010, TMC)
- I Don't Care – EP (2013)

=== Singles ===
- "Screw / Song Stuck" (19 October 2009, TMC)
- "Crash Test Dummy" (25 August 2010, TMC)
- "Guns & Boys" (2011, TMC)
- "NLTO (Not Like the Others" (2012, daWorks)
- "Sleepwalking" (2013, daWorks)
- "Sleepwalking" – (Rykkinnfella Remix) (2013, daWorks)
- "I Don't Care" (2013, daWorks)
- "If That's the Only Way" (2013, daWorks)
- "We Are Who We Are" (2013, daWorks)
- "It Gets Better" (2014, daWorks)
- "Be My Lover" (2014, daWorks)
- "(Come a Little) Closer" (2015, daWorks)
- "Hurricane Lover", with Agnete (2015, daWorks)
- "Champions" (2015, daWorks)
- "Burning" (2015, daWorks)
- "Hot Crush (Coming Home with Me)", feature with Östberg (2016, daWorks)
- "You on Me" (2017, daWorks)
- "Despacito", with Adrian Jørgensen (2018, daWorks), certified Platinum by IFPI Norway, 5.9 million streams
- "Waste No Time" (2018, daWorks)
- "Hold Me Down" (2019, Motormouth)
- "Shallow (Så Ekte Nå)", with Åge Sten Nilsen (2020, Generation), certified Gold by IFPI Norway, 3 million streams
