= Antoine Clamaran =

French producer and DJ (born 1964)

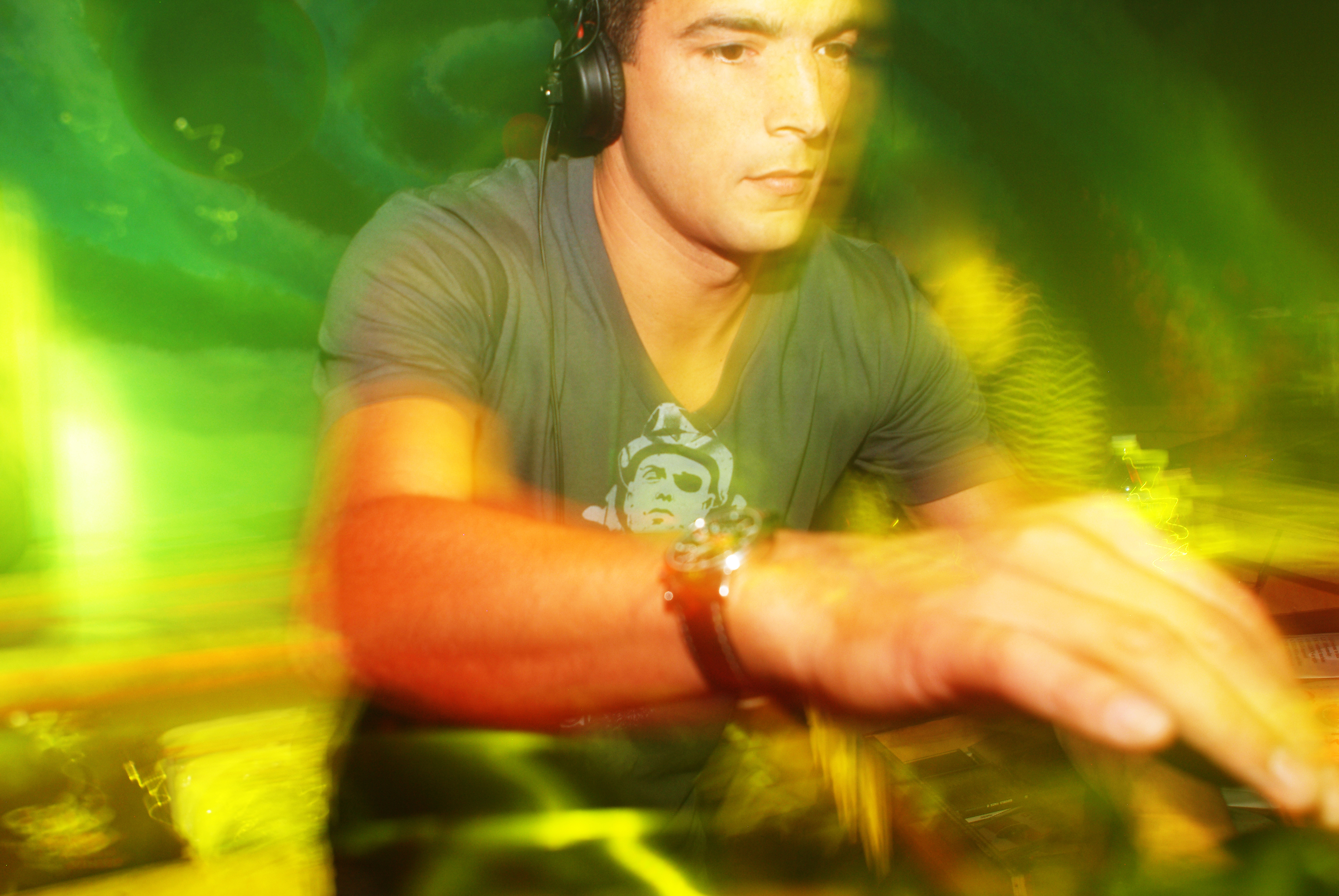
- Antoine Clamaran in September 2007.

Background information
- Born: Antoine Clamaran-Danzelle; 8 November 1964 (age 61); Neuilly-sur-Seine, Île-de-France, France
- Genres: House, French house
- Website: www.antoineclamaran.com

Antoine Clamaran-Danzelle (French: [ɑ̃twan klamaʁɑ̃ dɑ̃zɛl]; born 8 November 1964) is a French house music producer, DJ and remixer. Clamaran was born in Neuilly-sur-Seine. In the early 1990s, his local fame interested Maximum FM, the leading parisian dance radio station at that time. Impressed by his mixing gift, Clamaran gained a huge audience and started to be booked for one off parties. But Palace headquarters asked him to run the mythical Gay Tea Dance every Sunday, instead of French icon Laurent Garnier.

Clamaran's technical foundation was built on several years of conservatory training, where he studied saxophone, guitar, and bass. His transition to house music was significantly influenced by his work as a stage designer, which led to a pivotal mentorship under DJ Master Seb.

== Biography ==
In 1992 Clamaran, eager to get involved into production, teamed up with Laurent Pautrat. Their first Production "I've got music in me" by 400 Hz made him one of the most promising French producers. Released on House Trade Records, this track was licensed by BMG France and sold over 100,000 units.

Then record companies started to flood Clamaran with remixing requests such as : "Funky Music" by Calvin Stone, "oxygene" by Jean Michel Jarre, "party time" by Gloria Estefan, "you spin me round" by Dead or Alive and "Encore Une Fois" by Euro smash. His own productions under the names of Carayca, 400 Hz, D-Plac, LAC, Unchain & House Train were always at the top the DJ playlists but it was not until 1998 was he again to enter the French top 50 best-sellers list.

As a DJ he switched his residency from Palace to the Temple of Dance in Paris: Le Queen.

During 1998 he produced 3 club smashes under the name Omega: "Dreaming Of A Better World", "Peace & Harmony", "The Mission". All these tracks went gold status in France (250,000 units) but didn't make any sales abroad.

By 1999, Clamaran had reached a blockbuster status in France but he chose to come back to house music, leaving behind the commercial path laid out for him. He decided to produce tracks under his own name and oriented for the international markets. His first productions under his name; "Do The Funk", "Get Up" and "After", were written with the now famous "french filtered sound".

These tracks were licensed by US based label Filtered records and released on the Discoland EP. The record became a "must have" for most of the world's key DJs including Boris Duglosch, Erick Morillo, Pete Tong, Danny Rampling and Robbie Rivera. With "We Come To Party" feat. Blue James (Basement jaxx singer), the filtered disco style of Clamaran, became an asset for the house community.

In 1999, a few days before New Year's Eve, Clap production (Clamaran /Pautrat label) merged into Penso Positivo (firm of another famous DJ in France : Claude Monnet).

Antoine is now managing 4 labels, as producer and a&r, within Penso Possitivo: Academy, North Club, House Trade Records and Basic traxx.

In 2000, he achieved charts success with Vibration INC. Antoine Clamaran is currently the resident in the two biggest parisian clubs: Les Bains Douches and Le Queen.

The leading single from his 2009 album Spotlight, "Gold", reached #5 position in Russia and topped the Moscow Airplay Chart.

Between 2010 and 2012, Clamaran entered a prolific collaborative phase with Spanish singer Soraya Arnelas. This partnership produced the hit "Live Your Dreams" and culminated in the 2012 single "Feeling You." During the Starfloor 2011 event at the Palais Omnisports de Paris-Bercy, Clamaran revealed that he had produced "Feeling You" with such creative autonomy that his record label had not heard the track prior to its live debut.

== Discography ==
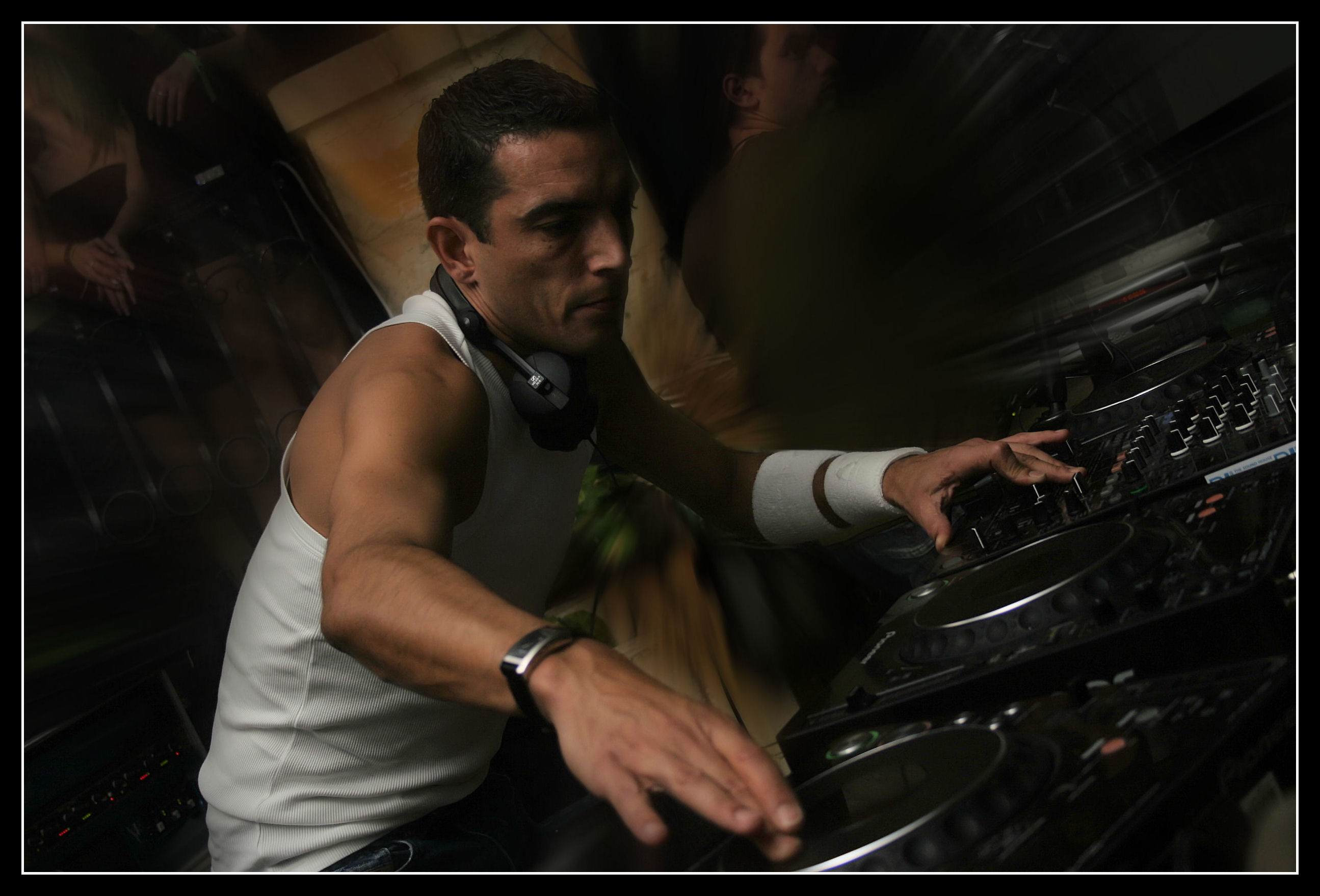
Antoine Clamaran in Malta

=== Studio albums ===
- 2002 : Release Yourself (FR #43)
- 2009 : Spotlight (FR #134)

=== Compilation ===
- 2007 : Inside: The Best of Antoine Clamaran

=== Singles (selection) ===
- 1999 : Do the Funk
- 1999 : We Come to Party
- 2000 : Get Up (It Doesn't Matter) (FR #76, NL #85)
- 2002 : Release Yourself (feat. Lulu Hughes)
- 2004 : Feel It (feat. Lulu Hughes)
- 2006 : Take Off
- 2006 : Keep on Tryin' (feat. Emily Chick) (FR #62)
- 2009 : Gold (PL #1, FR #20, CH #67)
- 2009 : Reach for the Stars
- 2009 : When the Sun Goes Down (feat. Mazaya)
- 2009 : Believe (Ministers De La Funk vs. Antoine Clamaran & Sandy Vee) (FR #24)
- 2010 : Live Your Dreams (feat. Soraya) (FR #11)
- 2011 : Stick Shift (feat. Soraya)
- 2012 : Feeling You (Antoine Clamaran & Vince M. feat. Soraya) (ES #47, FR #183)
