= David Urwitz =

Swedish singer and musician (born 1973)

- Born: 1973 (age 52–53); Sweden
- Occupations: Singer, musician
- Years active: 2005 – present
- Website: www.davidurwitz.se

David Urwitz (born 1973) is a Swedish singer and musician.

He grew up in Trollhättan but resides in Masthugget, Gothenburg. Urwitz releases his music on his own record label Alvy Singer Records. For his albums, he collaborated with producers like Andreas Dahlbäck, Hans Olsson Brookes and Daniel Claesson. He also collaborated with other singers like Anna Maria Espinosa, Helene Bøksle and Irma Schultz Keller.

== Discography ==
=== Albums ===
| Year | Title | Peak position | Certification |
| Year | Title | SWE | Certification |
|---|---|---|---|
| 2005 | Det var väl inget mer med det | 41 | |
| 2006 | I väntan på vad | 9 | |
| 2007 | Undrar om det syns | 22 | |
| 2009 | Så långt det är möjligt | 27 | |
| 2012 | Ta mig nånstans där solen skiner | 18 | |
| 2013 | En gång i världen | 18 | |

=== Singles ===
| Year | Single | Peak Position | Certification | Album |
| Year | Single | SWE | Certification | Album |
|---|---|---|---|---|
| 2006 | "Oj oj" | 46 | | |
| 2007 | "Din skull" | 6 | | |
| 2008 | "En eftermiddag" | 42 | | |
| 2009 | "Det är kanske så" (with Anna Maria Espinosa) | 53 | | |

Non-charting singles

- 2001: "Jag var som du"
- 2010: "Hos mig" (Helene Bøksle)
- 2011: "Kasta sten”
- 2012: "Fråga någon som vet"

Promotional singles

- 2005: "Sjung för mig" (Promosingle)
- 2005: "Allt jag sa" (Promosingle)
- 2005: "Jag gör vad som helst" (Promosingle)
- 2007: "Enkelt" (Promosingle)
