= La noche es para mí =

2009 song by Soraya Arnelas

Single by Soraya

from the album Sin miedo
- Language: Spanish
- Released: 12 January 2009
- Recorded: 2008
- Genre: Europop; dance
- Length: 3:00
- Label: Vale; Universal
- Composers: Irini Michas; Dimitri Stassos; Jason Gill
- Lyricist: Felipe Pedroso

Soraya singles chronology
"Sin miedo" (2008)	"La noche es para mí" (2009)	"Live Your Dreams" (2010)

Music video
- "La noche es para mí" on YouTube

Eurovision Song Contest 2009 entry
- Country: Spain
- Artist: Soraya Arnelas
- As: Soraya
- Language: Spanish
- Composers: Irini Michas; Dimitri Stassos; Jason Gill
- Lyricist: Felipe Pedroso

Finals performance
- Final result: 24th
- Final points: 23

Entry chronology
- ◄ "Baila el Chiki-chiki" (2008)
- "Algo pequeñito" (2010) ►

Official performance video
- "La noche es para mí" (Final) on YouTube

"La noche es para mí" (Spanish pronunciation: [la ˈnotʃe es ˈpaɾa ˈmi]; "The Night is for Me") is a song by Spanish singer Soraya, with music composed by Irini Michas, Dimitri Stassos, and Jason Gill, and lyrics by Felipe Pedroso. It was released on 12 January 2009 in Spain as the second single from Soraya's fourth studio album Sin miedo. It represented Spain in the Eurovision Song Contest 2009, placing twenty-fourth.

== Background ==
=== Conception ===
The song, was composed in 2007 by Irini Michas, Dimitri Stassos, and Jason Gill with Greek lyrics and with title "Αυτά που ξέρεις" ("Afta pou ksereis"). It was first offered to Helena Paparizou for her fourth album, but she turned it down as she wanted pop rock themes. It was later offered to Maro Lytra, who also turned it down, and to Chrispa, who considered to enter the Greek selection for the Eurovision Song Contest 2008 with it. Ultimately, none of these three artists recorded or released the song.

Soraya and her producers agreed to include the song in her fourth studio album Sin miedo, that was released on 13 October 2008. The song was arranged under the title "La noche es para mí", and the Spanish lyrics –with a few phrases in English– were written by Felipe Pedroso.

=== Eurovision ===
On 20 December 2008, following the request of many of her fans and two hours before the deadline, Soraya announced she would submit the song to the national selection Eurovisión 2009: El retorno that Radiotelevisión Española (RTVE) was organizing to choose its entrant for the 54th edition of the Eurovision Song Contest. As none of the artists who had previously been offered the song had recorded or released it, it was still eligible to participate in Eurovision, according to the contest rules.

The song qualified in the Internet voting preselection and it went to the televised competition held on 14–28 February 2009, and aired on La 1 of Televisión Española. "La noche es para mí" sung by Soraya won the competition so it became the Spanish entry for the Eurovision Song Contest 2009.

On 16 May 2009, the grand final of the Eurovision Song Contest was held in the Olimpiysky Arena in Moscow hosted by Channel One (C1R) and broadcast live throughout the continent. Soraya performed "La noche es para mí" twenty-fifth and last on the night, following Finland's "Lose Control" by Waldo's People. A new version of the song was revealed live at the contest itself, a version not intended to be released commercially. This new version started more slowly with a violin solo and reached higher notes by the end.

At the close of voting, it had received 23 points, placing twenty-fourth in a field of twenty-five. If only jury votes had been given, it would have finished last, while in only televoting votes it finished on the joint 20th position.

== Chart history ==
=== Weekly charts ===
Chart (2009)	Peak position
Spain (Promusicae)	9
Sweden (Sverigetopplistan)	25
