= Romina Contiero =

Italian singer (born 1983)

Romina Contiero (born 1983) known as Tata Golosa is an Italian female singer and a professional dancer. Her producers are Antonello Righi and Daniele Filippone.

She became famous in 2007 with the videoclip Micromania, which became very popular in Brazil and Portugal and became a summer hit, a candidate to be the "song of the summer" in Spain.

Romina Contiero has a degree in dance, teaches jazz dance and is a co-owner of three dance schools in Milan.

She has been engaged to Marco Masini from 2001 to 2005.

== Discography ==
- 2014: Busca Busca (single)
- 2009: Fotonovela (album)
- 2008: La Pastilla (single)
- 2008: Micromania (single)
- 2007: Micromania (Los micrófonos) (videoclip)
