= Javi Mota =

Spanish singer, actor, dancer and model (born 1984)

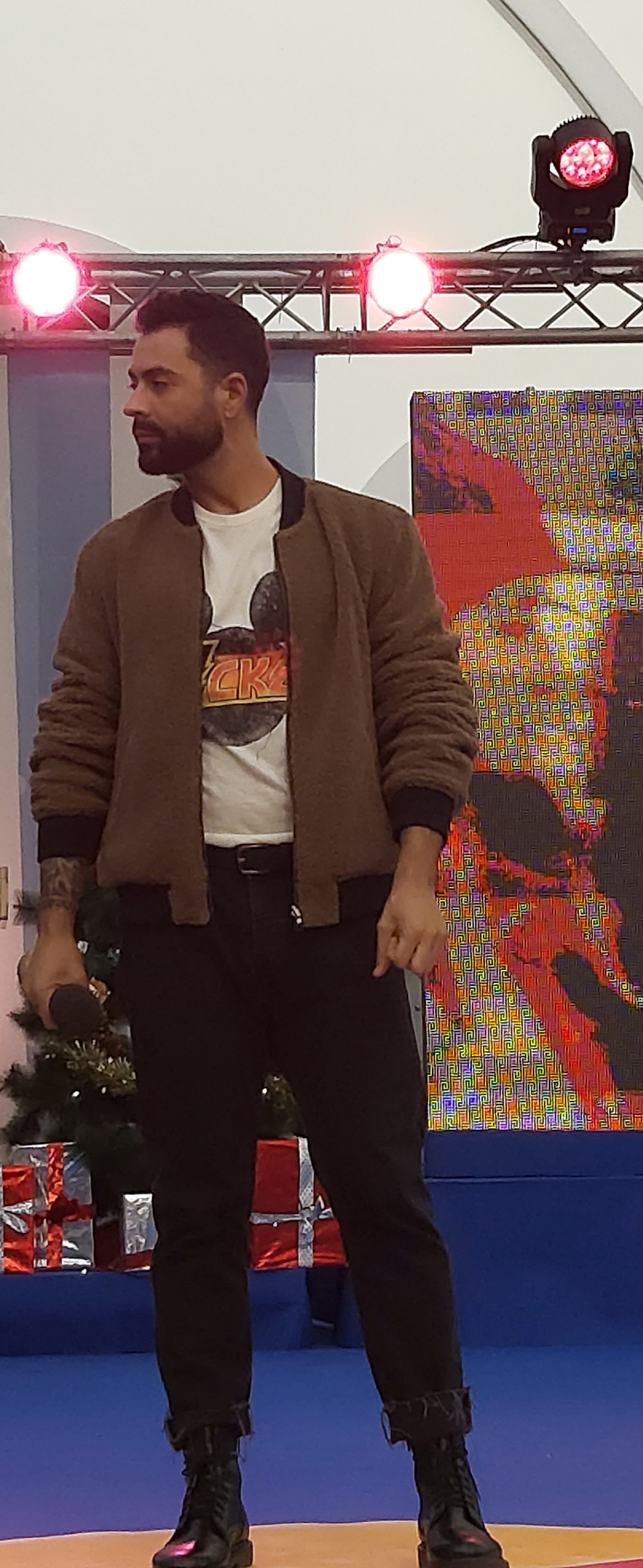
- Spanish singer, actor, dancer and model

Background information
- Born: Javier Mota Garcia; 28 May 1984 (age 41); Motril, Granada, Spain
- Genres: Pop, dance
- Occupations: Singer, actor, dancer, model
- Instrument: Vocal
- Website: www.javimotamusica.com

Javi Mota (born Javier Mota Garcia; 28 May 1984, in Motril, Granada, Spain) is a Spanish singer, actor, dancer and model.

== Early life ==
Javi Mota started taking dance and music classes at a very young age. At the age of 12, he landed a role in Menudo Show television series and two years later in the program Veo Veo. In 1999, at age of 15, he became a radio announcer on "La Mañana", a youth music program.

=== In Gypsy Teens ===
In 2000, at age of 16, he won a big casting competition, and became part of the musical group Gypsy Teens, that was signed to Universal Music Spain S.L. and toured with them giving him great national and international exposure. The 5-member band included two boys, Javi and Ricky and three girls, Hayley, Sandy and Jackie. The band had a number of hit singles on radio (like up-beat remakes of "Club Tropicana", "Bamboleo" etc.) and was promoted not only in Spain but also in continental Europe, more specifically France and Germany and was featured, amongst others on specialized music video channels like MTV, Viva TV, GIGA TV. "Club Tropicana" reached number 1 in Spain staying at the top of the Spanish Singles Chart for 2 weeks in April 2001. The band released in 2001 a successful album Gypsy Teens also known as gt. The project folded in 2003.

=== Other projects ===
In 2003, at 19, he studied musical theater in the Carmen Roche performing arts school in Madrid. He continued appearing on various music projects as well as television commercials. Still in school, Mota later on appeared in the youth television program Club Megatrix on Spanish Antena 3.

In 2003, after Gypsy Teens folded, he started building a solo singing career. He prepared a solo album ready by 2005, but the album failed to become a hit.

He also continued appearances in various theatre, dancing, television and modeling projects. He became a presenter on "Feria de la Moda de Madrid" (IFEMA), a Spanish fashion show. He took part in local musical theater versions of Flashdance and with musical theater group "La Decada Prodigiosa" and in musical Me voy a Barcelona. In 2006, he co-starred in a leading role on the television series Suárez y Mariscal on Cuatro TV and in El Buscuador on Telecinco.

== In Banghra ==
His big commercial musical success came in 2007 with the music and dance act Banghra with Lidia Guevara, joined for some time by Victoria Gómez. Signed to Vale Music, Banghra tried to reintroduce belly dancing to the mainstream in catchy songs sung in Spanish and English. In June 2007, their first album, "La Danza del Vientre" became a big sensation of the summer charts in Spain, with songs performed in Spanish and English taking the typical oriental / eastern sounds of belly dancing. The album reached position #3 in the Spanish pop charts. The single "My Own Way" reached #14 on the singles chart. The band followed it up with the album ...a bailar!, with hit singles "Una especie en extinción" (reaching #27) and Unidos, but the album was a far smaller hit reaching only #54. The band disbanded end of 2008.

== Solo career ==
After break-up of Banghra, Javi Mota continued a solo musical career and appeared in 2008 in the Nacho Cano musical "A".

In October 2010, he took part in Nacho Cano's Mecandance, alongside Gerard Martí, Antonio Martos (of D'Nash), Cristina Llorente, Edu Morlans, Mariade Vázquez, Ori de la Peña, Lydia Fairén and vocalist Nalaya Brown. Mecandance also released an album containing the songs of the show.

In 2011, Javi Mota signed with "Victorya Producciones" and on 14 May 2011 released a new single entitled "Llevaré". Also in 2011, he appeared in the music video of "Aquella noche" of Calaita. He also appeared on the Spanish soap opera series Basta Ya!!.

in 2012, he released his first solo studio album entitled Inesperado IV+I on the Océano record label, with "Y qué más da" as the first single from the album and with an accompanying music video.

In 2014, he came back with the bilingual Spanish/English dance release "Ready to Start". And starting December 2014 worked in the musical show formation Orquesta Olympus that included Mota, Cristina Sánchez, Peke, Dany Lamas, Frank Véliz. The formation released a number of titles including "Olympusmania" as a main single and music video.

Eurovision

In 2010, Javi Mota took part in the Spanish preselection contest in a bid to represent Spain in the Eurovision Song Contest 2010 to be held in Oslo. He presented the song "Amarte Hoy" written by Roel Garcia and produced by Ivan Vázquez, but failed to qualify.

== La Voz (2012) ==
In 2012, Javi Mota took part in the inaugural season of La Voz, the Spanish version of The Voice international series. In the blind auditions, and in the "blind audition" episode that aired on 17 October 2012, and the last of all the audition competitors, he sang "Que yo no quiero problemas" from singer David DeMaría. Melendi being the only judge left with possible choices as the other three judges namely David Bisbal, Rosario Flores and Malú had already completed their teams, Melendi chose to turn around while standing on his chair, and Javi Mota was automatically included in Team Melendi.

In the "battle round" on 31 October 2012, Melendi put Javi Mota against Mirela Cabero and they both sang "Devuélveme la vida". The coach eliminated Cabero and picked Mota to continue with the team for the next round. On 7 November 2012, in the sing-offs, Javi Mota performed his audition rendition but was eliminated in favour of Claritzel Miyareshe, another of Melendi's team contestants.

== Discography ==
=== Albums ===
In Banghra

- 2007: La danza del vientre
- 2008: ...a bailar!

Solo

Title and details
Inesperado IV+I
- Type: Album
- Released: May 8, 2012
- Record label: Océano Music
Notes

No.	Title	Length
1.	"Y qué más da"	3:12
2.	"Caminaré"	2:59
3.	"Cerca de ti"	4:18
4.	"Hay ángeles que duermen en tus ojos"	4:17
5.	"Tú no me cortas las alas"	3:36
6.	"Lluvia de Abril"	3:50
7.	"Cuidado con ella"	3:03
8.	"Se me rompe el alma"	4:26
9.	"¿Que será?"	3:44
10.	"María"	3:05
11.	"No puede ser"	3:13
12.	"Secret"	3:34

=== Singles ===
In Gypsy Teens

- 2000: "Club Tropicana"
- 2001: "Bamboleo"

In Banghra

- 2007: "My Own Way"
- 2008: "Promised Land"
- 2008: "Una especie en extinción"
- 2008: "Unidos"

Solo

- 2010: "Amarte Hoy"
- 2011: "Llevaré"
- 2012: "Y qué más da"
- 2013: "Tú no me cortas las alas"
- 2014: "Ready to Start"
- 2015: "Vivir asi"
- 2016: "Agua Bendita"
- 2019: "Iguales"

Featured in

- 2010: "Una rosa es una rosa" (in show Mecandance)
