= Gypsy Teens =

- Origin: Spain
- Genres: Pop
- Years active: 2000–2003
- Label: Universal Music Spain S.L.
- Members: Javi; Ricky; Hayley; Sandy; Jackie

Gypsy Teens was a famous Spanish boy/girl music band formed in 2000 out of a big casting competition and that was signed to Universal Music Spain S.L. The band toured having gained support from the label and also enjoyed international, mainly European exposure through their hit releases.

The members were all teens and included five teens, two boys, Javi and Ricky and three girls, Hayley, Sandy and Jackie.

The band had a number of hit singles on radio, including up-beat remakes of well known hits like "Club Tropicana" and "Bamboleo" etc. The releases were promoted not only in Spain but also in continental Europe, more specifically France and Germany and was featured, amongst others on specialized music video channels like MTV Europe, Viva TV, GIGA TV.

"Club Tropicana" reached number 1 in Spain staying at the top of the Spanish Singles Chart for 2 weeks in April 2001.

The band also released the self-titled album Gypsy Teens also stylized as gt.

The project folded in 2003.

== After split-up ==
After split-up, its members have all gone to solo projects. Very notably, Javi Mota from the band was part of the band Banghra in 2007, also appearing in a number of musicals and in 2012 a contestant in season 1 of the Spanish La Voz competition.

== Discography ==
=== Albums ===
- 2001: Gypsy Teens (gt)

Track list:

1. "Club Tropicana" (Spanish)
2. "Bamboleo"
3. "King of Spades"
4. "Djobi Djoba"
5. "Volando Voy"
6. "Te Extraño"
7. "Nada Es Igual"
8. "Vive Ya!"
9. "Volare"
10. "Gypsyteens"
11. "Bailame"
12. "Do You Need Me"
13. "Club Tropicana" (English)

=== Singles ===
Year	Album	Peak positions	Album
Year	Album	SPN	Album
2001	"Club Tropicana"	1	Gypsy Teens
2001	"Bamboleo"		Gypsy Teens
