= Antonio Martos Ortiz =

Spanish singer

- Born: 19 February 1981 (age 45); Valencia, Spain
- Genre: Pop
- Occupation: Singer
- Years active: 2006–present
- Labels: Sony BMG, Caes

Antonio Martos Ortiz (born 19 February 1981) is a notable ex-member of the boyband D'NASH. He was known simply as Ony and was the passionate member of the band.

== D'Nash ==
In 2006, Antonio formed a band named D'Nash with friends Esteban Piñero Camacho, Michael Hennet Sotomayor and Francisco Javier Álvarez Colinet. They are the first Spanish boy band ever.

== Nacho Cano musical ==
On 22 July 2008 it was announced that Ony would leave the group after their summer tour ends in September. He is leaving to pursue a career in musical theatre. Their last performance as a four-piece took place in Fuengirola, Málaga. The band's three remaining members continued following his departure.

In October 2010, he took part in Nacho Cano's Mecandance, alongside Javi Mota (ex-member of Banghra, Gerard Martí, Cristina Llorente, Edu Morlans, Mariade Vázquez, Ori de la Peña, Lydia Fairén and vocalist Nalaya Brown. Mecandance also released an album containing the songs of the show.

== Mecanlife ==
On 24 March 2014 he formed new music band named Mecanlife with Patrizia Navarro, Javi Mota and Karol.

== Discography ==
=== Studio albums ===
- 2006: Capaz de Todo
- 2007: Todo Va a Cambiar
