= Antonio Martos =

Antonio Martos may refer to:

- Antonio Martos Ortiz (born 1981), member of the boyband D'NASH
- Antonio Martos (cyclist) (born 1946), Spanish racing cyclist
