= La Voz (Spanish TV series) season 1 =

La Voz
- Season 1
- Hosted by: Jesús Vázquez; Tania Llasera (Backstage)
- Judges: David Bisbal; Rosario Flores; Malú; Melendi
- Winner: Rafa Blas
- Runner-up: Jorge González

Release
- Original network: Telecinco
- Original release: 19 September – 19 December 2012

Season chronology
- Next → Season 2

La Voz is a Spanish reality talent show that premiered on 19 September 2012 on Telecinco. Based on the reality singing competition The Voice of Holland, the series was created by Dutch television producer John de Mol. It is part of an international series.

The coaches for the debut season were David Bisbal, Rosario Flores, Malú and Melendi. Jesús Vázquez hosted the programme while Tania Llasera shared hosting duties as the social media correspondent. The first episode kicked off with 4,591,000 viewers (30.6% market share).

== Step 1: « Audiciones a ciegas » (Blind Auditions) ==
The Blind Auditions were taped in the third week of August 2012 and were aired from 19 September to 17 October 2012 in five telecasts. 80 auditioners took part in the Blind Auditions. Each coach had to form a team of 14 contestants.

Key	Coach hit his or her "QUIERO TU VOZ" button	Contestant eliminated with no coach pressing his or her "QUIERO TU VOZ" button	Contestant defaulted to this coach's team	Contestant elected to join this coach's team

=== Episode 1: 19 September 2012 ===
The first episode began with the four coaches singing "Viviendo deprisa".

Order	Contestant	Song	Coaches' and Contestants' Choices			
Order	Contestant	Song	David Bisbal	Rosario Flores	Malú	Melendi
1	Mara Ferrándiz	"I Am What I Am"		—	—	—
2	Maika Barbero	"Heaven"				
3	Borja Llamas	"Every Breath You Take"	—	—	—	—
4	Angélica Leyva	"Volver"				
5	Neus Ferri	"You Shook Me All Night Long"	—	—		
6	Rocío Albalaejo	"Te dejé marchar"	—	—	—	—
7	Abraham Fernández	"Hallelujah"	—		—	
8	Paula Rojo	"Chicken Fried"				
9	Virginia Alexandre	"La flaca"		—	—	—
10	Tina Riobo	"Georgia on My Mind"	—	—	—	—
11	Rebeca Moscardó	"Run to You"				
12	Mercedes Pérez	"Qué no daría yo"	—	—	—	
13	Charo Giménez	"Sweet Child o' Mine"	—	—	—	—
14	Mirela Cabero	"Sola otra vez"	—	—	—	
15	Yago Ibars	"Your Body Is a Wonderland"	—	—	—	—
16	Juan Carlos Mata	"Summertime"				

=== Episode 2: 26 September 2012 ===
Order	Contestant	Song	Coaches' and Contestants' Choices			
Order	Contestant	Song	David Bisbal	Rosario Flores	Malú	Melendi
1	Lola Dorado	"Respect"				
2	Sheila Mesas	"Para que tú no llores"	—	—	—	—
3	Héctor Roldán	"En la casa de Inés"	—			—
4	Damaris Martínez	"It's a Man's Man's Man's World"	—			—
5	Sandra Arco	"Se nos rompió el amor"				
6	Jesús Rodríguez	"Si bastasen un par de canciones"	—	—	—	—
7	Manuela Paz	"Roxanne"	—	—		
8	Anael Santana	"Rolling in the Deep"			—	—
9	Pau Piqué	"For Once in My Life"		—		
10	Jessyca Zades	"I'm Outta Love"	—	—	—	—
11	Alfonso Vera	"Superstition"	—	—	—	—
12	Nieves Hidalgo	"Solamente Tú"		—	—	
13	Marta Santamaría	"Flor de Lis"	—	—	—	
14	Gema Hernández	"Diles"	—	—	—	—
15	Javi Brichis	"Billie Jean"	—	—	—	
16	Núria Martínez	"Rock and Roll"	—	—		—

=== Episode 3: 3 October 2012 ===
Order	Contestant	Song	Coaches' and Contestants' Choices			
Order	Contestant	Song	David Bisbal	Rosario Flores	Malú	Melendi
1	Anabella Arregui	"Me Muero"	—		—	—
2	Paco Arrojo	"Y cómo es él"				
3	Judith Pujibet	"Tainted Love"	—	—	—	—
4	Jésus Sánchez	"Corazón Partío"	—	—	—	—
5	Miguel Kocina	"Feeling Good"		—		
6	Macarena Fernández	"Contigo en la distancia"	—			
7	Emmanuel Lehmann	"Nothing Compares 2 U"			—	
8	Iolanda Rodríguez	"Je veux"	—			—
9	Marta & María Pérez	"Fallen"		—	—	
10	Kristina Moreno	"Si nos dejan"	—	—	—	—
11	David Ros	"Use Somebody"				
12	Susanna del Río	"Looking for Paradise"	—	—	—	
13	Juan Saavedra	"Como un burro amarrado en la puerta del baile"	—	—	—	—
14	Estitxu Pinatxo	"I'm Outta Love"	—		—	—
15	Marta Jaume	"Perfect"	—	—	—	—
16	Nicky Triphook	"Forget You"	—	—		—

=== Episode 4: 10 October 2012 ===
Order	Contestant	Song	Coaches' and Contestants' Choices			
Order	Contestant	Song	David Bisbal	Rosario Flores	Malú	Melendi
1	Efrén García	"Quiero un camino"	—			—
2	Tony Amboaje	"The Best"				
3	Mireia Milanés	"Flor de Romero"	—	—	—	—
4	Sharay Abellán	"Fallin'"		—		—
5	Paola González	"Amiga Mía"	—	—	—	—
6	Lorena Ruiz	"Somewhere Over the Rainbow"	—		—	—
7	Yhadira García	"Solamente Tú"	—		—	
8	Hugo Torreiro	"Tu mirada me hace grande"	—	—	—	—
9	Brequette Shana	"For Once in My Life"				—
10	Eli López	"Blanco y negro"	—			—
11	Noemí Calumarte	"Wicked Game"			—	—
12	Paco Orellana	"Noches de bohemia"	—	—	—	—
13	Claritzel Miyares	"Cómo fue"	—	—	—	
14	Beatriz Herrero	"Think"	—			
15	Jorge & Alberto Mena	"Vivir lo nuestro"	—	—	—	—
16	Eva María Cortés	"Desátame"		—		

=== Episode 5: 17 October 2012 ===
Order	Contestant	Song	Coaches' and Contestants' Choices			
Order	Contestant	Song	David Bisbal	Rosario Flores	Malú	Melendi
1	María Moreta	"Price Tag"	—	—		—
2	Yanela Brooks	"A Natural Woman"		—	—	
3	Maravillas Ballesta	"Todo irá bien"	—	—	—	—
4	Jorge González	"Lucía"	—			
5	Mónica Guech	"Someone like You"	—			—
6	Alejandro Canals	"A mi manera"		—		—
7	Yolanda Vierge	"Y sin embargo te quiero"		—		
8	Pilar Revuelta	"Sweet Dreams"	—	—	—	—
9	Rafa Blas	"Highway to Hell"				
10	David Santiago	"No estamos locos"	—N/a		—	—
11	Eduardo Ruimán	"Te quiero, te quiero"	—N/a	—	—	
12	Nuria Martorell	"Street Life"	—N/a			—
13	Miguel Sánchez	"She Will Be Loved"	—N/a	—N/a	—	—
14	Alfonso Aibar	"Delilah"	—N/a	—N/a	—	—
15	Isabel Barría	"Nostalgia"	—N/a	—N/a		—
16	Javi Mota	"Que yo no quiero problemas"	—N/a	—N/a	—N/a	

== Step 2: « Las Batallas » (The Battles) ==
The Battle Round was taped in early October 2012 and was aired from 24 October to 7 November 2012 in three telecasts. Coaches begin narrowing down the playing field by training the contestants with the help of "trusted advisors". This round features twenty-eight battles consisting of pairings from within each team, and each battle concluding with the respective coach eliminating one of the two contestants. After the battles, each coach is left with seven contestants; each coach saves five of these to advance to the live shows, whereas the two remaining singers do a sing-off for the remaining live show spot. Thus, six contestants for each coach advance to the live shows.

The trusted advisors for these episodes are: Luis Fonsi working with David Bisbal, Antonio Carmona working with Rosario Flores, Tiziano Ferro working with Malú and Nek working with Melendi.

– Battle Winner

=== Episode 6: 24 October 2012 ===
Order	Coach	Contestant	Contestant	Song
1	David Bisbal	Virginia Alexandre	Lola Dorado	"Lady Marmalade"
2	Rosario Flores	Jorge González	Damaris Martínez	"What You're Made of"
3	Melendi	Tony Amboaje	Maika Barbero	"I Don't Want to Miss a Thing"
4	Malú	Macarena Fernández	Pau Piqué	"Somos Novios"
5	Melendi	Paula Rojo	Yhadira García	"Complicated"
6	David Bisbal	Nieves Hidalgo	Sandra Arco	"Torre de Arena"
7	Rosario Flores	Mónica Guech	Nuria Martorell	"Without You"
8	Melendi	Eduardo Ruimán	Miguel Kocina	"Torero"
9	Malú	Nicky Triphook	Hector Roldán	"Always"
10	Rosario Flores	Anabella Arregui	Lorena Ruiz	"Aprendiz"
11	Malú	Manuela Paz	Núria Martínez	"Firework"

=== Episode 7: 31 October 2012 ===
Order	Coach	Contestant	Contestant	Song
1	Malú	Beatriz Herrero	Rebeca Moscardó	"I Have Nothing"
2	David Bisbal	Eva María Cortés	Mara Ferrándiz	"Last Dance"
3	Melendi	Javi Mota	Mirela Cabero	"Devuélveme la vida"
4	Rosario Flores	Emmanuel Lehmann	Abraham Fernández	"Sorry Seems to Be the Hardest Word"
5	Melendi	Mercedes Pérez	Susana del Río	"Y, ¿Si Fuera Ella?"
6	Malú	María Moreta	Yolanda Rodríguez	"Manos al Aire"
7	David Bisbal	Rafa Blas	David Ros	"It's My Life"
8	Malú	Eli López	Efrén García	"Recuérdame"
9	Melendi	Neus Ferri	Javi Brichis	"Ironic"
10	David Bisbal	Yanela Brooks	Yolanda Vierge	"Historia de un Amor"
11	Rosario Flores	Juan Carlos Mata	David Santiago	"Volando voy"

=== Episode 8: 7 November 2012 ===
Order	Coach	Contestant	Contestant	Song
1	David Bisbal	Marta & María Pérez	Paco Arrojo	"No Me Ames"
2	Rosario Flores	Angélica Leyva	Noemí Calumarte	"Vivir sin aire"
3	Melendi	Marta Santamaría	Claritzel Miyares	"Mas que Nada"
4	David Bisbal	Brequette Shana	Sharay Abellán	"If I Ain't Got You"
5	Malú	Alejandro Canals	Isabel Barría	"Mi amante amigo"
6	Rosario Flores	Anael Santana	Estitxu Pinatxo	"I Wanna Dance with Somebody"

==== Sing-off ====
Each contestant that had to go through the sing-off performed the same song they had sung in the Blind Auditions.

– Sing-off Winner

Order	Coach	Contestant	Contestant
1	David Bisbal	Mara Ferrándiz	Lola Dorado
2	Rosario Flores	Jorge González	Juan Carlos Mata
3	Malú	Núria Martínez	Alejandro Canals
4	Melendi	Javi Mota	Claritzel Miyares

== Step 3: « Los Directos » (Live Shows) ==
Five Live Shows will be aired from 21 November to 19 December 2012. The first live show was scheduled for 14 November 2012, but it was postponed one week due to a general strike in Spain and replaced by a special best moments episode.

Public televoting begins at this point, with one candidate eliminated from each team in the first two live shows. Voting lines open during the broadcast of each live show. The first half of each team performs in the first Live Show, the second half in the second Live Show. In these first two shows, in each team, one contestant is automatically sent to the next round thanks to the votes of the audience, and the coach chooses one of the other two contestants to stay. After the first two shows, 16 singers remain (4 from each team) and perform in the third show; in each team one contestant is saved by the public and another one by the team's coach. In the semi-final, the 8 remaining contestants perform (2 from each team); one finalist is chosen for each team in a decision where both the team's coach and the public voting weight equally. In the final, public voting decides the winner between the 4 remaining contestants (one from each team).

=== Episode 9: 21 November 2012 ===
- Celebrity performer: Melendi with "Lágrimas desordenadas"

Competition performances

Performance Order	Coach	Contestant	Song	Result
1	David Bisbal	Lola Dorado	"Chain of Fools"	Eliminated
2	David Bisbal	Paco Arrojo	"Ahora quién"	Saved by the public
3	David Bisbal	Yanela Brooks	"Proud Mary"	Saved by her coach
4	Rosario Flores	Anabella Arregui	"Oye"	Saved by her coach
5	Rosario Flores	Mónica Guech	"Empire State of Mind"	Eliminated
6	Rosario Flores	Jorge González	"Adoro"	Saved by the public
7	Melendi	Paula Rojo	"Torn"	Saved by her coach
8	Melendi	Claritzel Miyares	"Mientes"	Eliminated
9	Melendi	Maika Barbero	"Carrie"	Saved by the public
10	Malú	Héctor Roldán	"Angels"	Eliminated
11	Malú	Núria Martínez	"Zombie"	Saved by her coach
12	Malú	Pau Piqué	"New York, New York"	Saved by the public

Non-competition performances

Performance Order	Performers	Song
1	David Bisbal and his team (Lola Dorado, Paco Arrojo & Yanela Brooks)	"When I Look at You"
2	Rosario Flores and her team (Anabella Arregui, Mónica Guech & Jorge González)	"Qué bonito"
3	Melendi and his team (Paula Rojo, Claritzel Miyares & Maika Barbero)	"Cuestión de prioridades"
4	Malú and her team (Héctor Roldán, Núria Martínez & Pau Piqué)	"Blanco y negro"

=== Episode 10: 28 November 2012 ===
- Celebrity performer: Malú and Aleks Syntek with "Sólo el amor nos salvará"

Competition performances

Performance Order	Coach	Contestant	Song	Result
1	Melendi	Susanna del Río	"En ausencia de ti"	Saved by default
2	Melendi	Eduardo Ruimán	"Remolino"	Withdrawn (Note: Ruimán announced he was withdrawing from the contest right after his competition performance because of differences with the producers of the show and his coach; allegedly the producers were not warned about this beforehand. The host said that, due to the contest regulations, public voting had to continue as it had been planned. Ruimán was revealed to have won the public voting but the other two contestants advanced because of his withdrawal.)
3	Melendi	Neus Ferri	"Total Eclipse of the Heart"	Saved by default
4	Malú	Iolanda Rodríguez	"Out Here On My Own"	Saved by the public
5	Malú	Efrén García	"Aquello que me diste"	Eliminated
6	Malú	Rebeca Moscardó	"Adagio"	Saved by her coach
7	David Bisbal	Rafa Blas	"The Final Countdown"	Saved by the public
8	David Bisbal	Nieves Hidalgo	"Tanto"	Eliminated
9	David Bisbal	Brequette Shana	"Love on Top"	Saved by her coach
10	Rosario Flores	Angélica Leyva	"Piensa en mí"	Saved by her coach
11	Rosario Flores	Emmanuel Lehmann	"Ne me quitte pas"	Saved by the public
12	Rosario Flores	Anael Santana	"Flashdance... What a Feeling"	Eliminated

Non-competition performances

Performance Order	Performers	Song
1	Melendi and his team (Susanna del Río & Neus Ferri)	"Con sólo una sonrisa"
2	Malú and her team (Iolanda Rodríguez, Efrén García & Rebeca Moscardó)	"Ahora tú"
3	David Bisbal and his team (Rafa Blas, Nieves Hidalgo & Brequette Shana)	"Silencio"
4	Rosario Flores and her team (Angélica Leyva, Emmanuel Lehmann & Anael Santana)	"No dudaría"

=== Episode 11: 5 December 2012 ===
Competition performances

Performance Order	Coach	Contestant	Song	Result
1	Rosario Flores	Jorge González	"Hoy tengo ganas de ti"	Saved by the public
2	Rosario Flores	Anabella Arregui	"Halo"	Eliminated
3	Rosario Flores	Emmanuel Lehmann	"Your Song"	Eliminated
4	Rosario Flores	Angélica Leyva	"Alegría de vivir"	Saved by her coach
5	David Bisbal	Paco Arrojo	"I Believe I Can Fly"	Saved by his coach
6	David Bisbal	Yanela Brooks	"Yo viviré"	Eliminated
7	David Bisbal	Brequette Shana	"At Last"	Eliminated
8	David Bisbal	Rafa Blas	"The Winner Takes It All"	Saved by the public
9	Malú	Pau Piqué	"Cheek to Cheek"	Saved by the public
10	Malú	Rebeca Moscardó	"Hero"	Eliminated
11	Malú	Iolanda Rodríguez	"Can't Fight the Moonlight"	Saved by her coach
12	Malú	Núria Martínez	"What's Up"	Eliminated
13	Melendi	Paula Rojo	"Our Song"	Eliminated
14	Melendi	Neus Ferri	"El hombre del piano"	Saved by her coach
15	Melendi	Susanna del Río	"Umbrella"	Eliminated
16	Melendi	Maika Barbero	"Still Loving You"	Saved by the public

Non-competition performances

Performance Order	Performers	Song
1	La Voz Contestants (All the 16 contestants in the Live Show)	"Santa Claus Is Coming to Town"

=== Episode 12: 12 December 2012 (Semi-final) ===
- Celebrity performers: Alejandro Sanz with "Mi marciana"; Leona Lewis with "Lovebird"; Rosario Flores and Lolita Flores with "A tu vera"; David Bisbal and Malú with "Doy la vida"

Competition performances

Performance Order	Coach	Contestant	Song	Result			
Performance Order	Coach	Contestant	Song	Coach points (%)	Public points (%)	Total (%)	Eliminated or Saved?
1	Malú	Iolanda Rodríguez	"Imagine"	51%	36%	87%	Eliminated
2	Malú	Pau Piqué	"Smile"	49%	64%	113%	Saved
3	Melendi	Neus Ferri	"Call Me"	48%	46%	94%	Eliminated
4	Melendi	Maika Barbero	"Cryin'"	52%	54%	106%	Saved
5	David Bisbal	Paco Arrojo	"La quiero a morir"	37%	38%	75%	Eliminated
6	David Bisbal	Rafa Blas	"Livin' on a Prayer"	63%	62%	125%	Saved
7	Rosario Flores	Angélica Leyva	"Algo contigo"	49%	16%	65%	Eliminated
8	Rosario Flores	Jorge González	"Valió la Pena"	51%	84%	135%	Saved

Non-competition performances

Performance Order	Performers	Song
1	Malú and her team (Iolanda Rodríguez & Pau Piqué)	"Ni un segundo"
2	Alejandro Sanz and 4 contestants (Iolanda Rodríguez, Angélica Leyva, Maika Barbero and Paco Arrojo)	"No Me Compares"
3	Melendi and his team (Neus Ferri & Maika Barbero)	"Como una vela"
4	Leona Lewis and 4 contestants (Pau Piqué, Jorge González, Neus Ferri and Rafa Blas)	"Happy"
5	David Bisbal and his team (Paco Arrojo & Rafa Blas)	"Aquí y ahora"
6	Rosario Flores and her team (Angélica Leyva & Jorge González)	"Cómo quieres que te quiera"
7	Carly Rae Jepsen and the Top 4 contestants (Pau Piqué, Maika Barbero, Rafa Blas & Jorge González)	"Call Me Maybe"

=== Episode 13: 19 December 2012 (Final) ===
- Celebrity performers: Pablo Alborán with "El beso"; Rosario Flores and Antonio Carmona with "El sitio de mi recreo"

Solo performances

Performance Order	Coach	Contestant	Song	Result
1	Malú	Pau Piqué	"My Way"	Fourth place
2	David Bisbal	Rafa Blas	"The Show Must Go On"	Winner
3	Rosario Flores	Jorge González	"El día que me quieras"	Runner-up
4	Melendi	Maika Barbero	"With or Without You"	Third place

Duets with coach assistants

Performance Order	Coach	Contestant	Coach's assistant	Song
1	Melendi	Maika Barbero	Nek	"Para ti sería"
2	Rosario Flores	Jorge González	Antonio Carmona	"Para que tú no llores"
3	David Bisbal	Rafa Blas	Luis Fonsi	"No me doy por vencido"

Duets with coaches

Performance Order	Coach	Contestant	Song
1	Malú	Pau Piqué	"Contigo aprendí"
2	David Bisbal	Rafa Blas	"Hijo de la Luna"
3	Malú	Pau Piqué	"The Way You Look Tonight"
4	Rosario Flores	Jorge González	"Te quiero, te quiero"
5	Melendi	Maika Barbero	"Cheque al portamor"

Group performances with celebrities

Performance Order	Performers	Song
1	Mika and the Top 4 contestants (Pau Piqué, Jorge González, Maika Barbero & Rafa Blas)	"Celebrate"/"Rain"/"Relax, Take It Easy" medley
2	Pablo Alborán and 2 contestants (Jorge González & Pau Piqué)	"Tanto"
3	Eros Ramazzotti and 2 contestants (Maika Barbero & Rafa Blas)	"Un ángel como el sol tú eres"
4	Jamie Cullum and the Top 4 contestants (Pau Piqué, Jorge González, Maika Barbero & Rafa Blas)	"Everything You Didn't Do"

== Ratings ==
#	Episode	Original air date	Viewers	Share	Placement	Source
1	"Blind Auditions 1"	19 September 2012	4,591,000	30.6%	1	
2	"Blind Auditions 2"	26 September 2012	5,268,000	31.8%	1	
3	"Blind Auditions 3"	3 October 2012	5,423,000	33.4%	1	
4	"Blind Auditions 4"	10 October 2012	5,685,000	35.5%	1	
5	"Blind Auditions 5"	17 October 2012	6,030,000	35.2%	1	
6	"The Battles 1"	24 October 2012	5,336,000	35.5%	1	
7	"The Battles 2"	31 October 2012	4,899,000	33.9%	1	
8	"The Battles 3"	7 November 2012	5,307,000	34.4%	1	
9	"Live Shows 1"	21 November 2012	4,955,000	32.6%	1	
10	"Live Shows 2"	28 November 2012	4,840,000	33%	1	
11	"Live Shows 3"	5 December 2012	4,653,000	31.9%	1	
12	"Live Shows 4 - Semi-final"	12 December 2012	5,044,000	35.7%	1	
13	"Live Shows 5 - Final"	19 December 2012	5,453,000	37.3%	1	
