= My Own Way =

My Own Way may refer to:

- My Own Way (album), by Jay Sean, 2008
- My Own Way (EP), or the title track, by Evermore, 2003
- "My Own Way" (song), by Duran Duran, 1981
- My Own Way, a 1967 album by Hank Williams, Jr.
- "My Own Way", a 2015 song by Kita Alexander
- "My Own Way", a song by Banghra from the 2007 album La danza del vientre
- "My Own Way", a song by Snoop Dogg from the 2011 album Doggumentary
