= Mirela (singer) =

Spanish singer

- Born: Mirela Cabero García; 31 July 1990 (age 35)
- Origin: Aranjuez, Spain
- Genres: Pop; R&B; Latin pop
- Occupation: Singer
- Instrument: Vocals
- Years active: 2004–present
- Label: Cat Music
- Website: Mirela MySpace site

Mirela Cabero García (born 31 July 1990 in Aranjuez, Spain), simply known as Mirela, is a Spanish singer. Mirela has participated in various musical contests and singing competitions since she was a child.

== Career ==
=== 2004: Eurojunior 2004 ===
In 2004, Mirela participated in Eurojunior, the Spanish national selection process for the Junior Eurovision Song Contest 2004, where she competed with María Isabel and Blas Cantó. She reached the national final with her song "Conocí El Amor" (I Met Love). She narrowly lost out to María Isabel, who represented Spain and overall went on to win the European final with the song "Antes muerta que sencilla".

=== 2005: Gente de Primera ===
In 2005, she appeared in the television talent show Gente de Primera, competing for a record deal. She was praised by the judges and audience alike for her performances of Celine Dion's "Sola Otra Vez" and Mariah Carey's "Héroe". Mirela's mentor during the series was Pastora Soler. She went on to finish second overall in the competition, narrowly losing out to male pop singer Nauzet.

=== 2007–2009: Spanish national finals for Eurovision ===
In 2007, Mirela participated in Misión Eurovisión 2007, the Spanish national selection process for the Eurovision Song Contest 2007. She reached the final vote with the song "La Reina De La Noche" (The Queen of the Night). She was the favourite to win. However, she placed second once again, losing to boyband D'NASH.

In 2008, she submitted the song "Stronger" for Salvemos Eurovisión, the Spanish national selection process for the Eurovision Song Contest 2008, but did not reach the national final.

For the third year in a row, Mirela submitted her bid for the Eurovision Song Contest 2009, taking part in Eurovisión 2009: El Retorno with the song "Nada Es Comparable A Ti" (Nothing Compares to You). She first performed her song on the third semi final on 28 February 2009. She came in second place in her semi final and advanced to the final. She performed it for a second time in the final, and ended up finishing in fourth place overall. It was the most successful ballad to enter the national final that year.

=== 2012: La Voz ===
In September 2012, she entered talent show La Voz, the Spanish version of The Voice, on its first season. She performed "Sola Otra Vez" in the "Blind Auditions". One of the judges, Melendi, hit his "I Want You" button, thus she joined his team. In the second round of the contest, "The Battles", she was eliminated by Javier Mota, with whom she performed "Devuélveme La Vida".

=== 2013–present: El Rey León ===
In 2013, Mirela joined the cast of El Rey León, the Madrid production of the musical The Lion King, playing the role of Nala.

=== 2017: Objetivo Eurovisión 2017 ===
On 12 January 2017, Mirela was announced as one of the six candidates to represent Spain in the Eurovision Song Contest 2017. She participated in Objetivo Eurovisión 2017, her fourth national selection process for Eurovision, with "Contigo", a song written by Tony Sánchez-Ohlsson, Isaac Luke and Ander Pérez. She was the televote's favourite and collected 58 points overall, ending in a tie for the 1st place with Manel Navarro. However, in the tie breaking voting round, the jury chose Manel over Mirela to represent Spain in the Eurovision Song Contest 2017. The decision of the jury caused controversy among followers of the contest, who accused the broadcaster of rigging the results in order to favour Manel.

== Discography ==
=== Singles ===
Year	Title	Peak position	Album
Year	Title	SPA	Album
2016	"Soy Como Soy"	—	Non-album singles
2017	"Contigo"	—	Non-album singles
2024	"Tarde Para Más" (with Sandra Groove)	—	Non-album singles
2024	"Inevitable"	—	TBA
2025	"De Hielo"	—	TBA
2025	"Me Llorarás"	—	TBA

=== Promotional singles ===
Year	Title	Notes
2004	"Conocí El Amor"	Eurojunior 2004
2004	"Sí O No"	Eurojunior 2004
2007	"La Reina De La Noche"	Mision Eurovisión 2007
2007	"Tu Voz Se Apagará"	Mision Eurovisión 2007
2007	"I Love You Mi Vida"	Mision Eurovisión 2007
2007	"Busco Un Hombre"	Mision Eurovisión 2007
2007	"Una Lágrima"	Mision Eurovisión 2007
2008	"Stronger"	Salvemos Eurovisión
2009	"Nada Es Comparable A Ti"	Eurovisión: El Retorno
2012	"Devuélveme La Vida" (with Javier Mota)	La Voz
2023	"Parte De Él"	La Sirenita (Banda Sonora Original En Castellano)
2023	"Parte De Él (Repetición)"	La Sirenita (Banda Sonora Original En Castellano)
2023	"Por Vez Primera"	La Sirenita (Banda Sonora Original En Castellano)
2023	"Parte De Él (Repetición II)"	La Sirenita (Banda Sonora Original En Castellano)
