= Spain in the Eurovision Song Contest 2007 =

- Eurovision Song Contest 2007
- Participating broadcaster: Radiotelevisión Española (RTVE)
- Country: Spain
- Selection process: Misión Eurovisión
- Selection date: 24 February 2007

Competing entry
- Song: "I Love You Mi Vida"
- Artist: D'Nash
- Songwriters: Thomas G:son; Andreas Rickstrand; Tony Sánchez-Ohlsson; Rebeca Pous Del Toro

Placement
- Final result: 20th, 43 points

Participation chronology

Spain was represented at the Eurovision Song Contest 2007 with the song "I Love You Mi Vida" written by Thomas G:son, Andreas Rickstrand, Tony Sánchez-Ohlsson, and Rebeca Pous Del Toro, and performed by the group D'Nash. The Spanish participating broadcaster, Radiotelevisión Española (RTVE), organised the national final Misión Eurovisión in order to select its entry for the contest. The national final consisted of four heats, a semi-final and a final and involved 57 competing acts. Five acts and five songs ultimately qualified to compete in the televised final where a public televote first selected the top five to advance to the second round. In the second round of voting, a regional televote exclusively selected "I Love You Mi Vida" performed by Nash as the winner. The group was later renamed as D'Nash for the Eurovision Song Contest.

As a member of the "Big Four", Spain automatically qualified to compete in the final of the Eurovision Song Contest. Performing in position 2, Spain placed twentieth out of the 24 participating countries with 43 points.

== Background ==
Prior to the 2007 contest, Televisión Española (TVE) had participated in the Eurovision Song Contest representing Spain forty-six times since its first entry in 1961. It has won the contest on two occasions: in 1968 with the song "La, la, la" performed by Massiel and in 1969 with the song "Vivo cantando" performed by Salomé, the latter having won in a four-way tie with France, the Netherlands, and the United Kingdom. It has also finished second four times, with "En un mundo nuevo" by Karina in 1971, "Eres tú" by Mocedades in 1973, "Su canción" by Betty Missiego in 1979, and "Vuelve conmigo" by Anabel Conde in 1995. In 2006, TVE placed twenty-first with the song "Bloody Mary" performed by Las Ketchup.

After a restructuring that led to the incorporation of TVE into the current Radiotelevisión Española (RTVE) corporation on 1 January 2007, it was the latter who participated in the 2007 contest. As part of its duties as participating broadcaster, RTVE organised the selection of its entry in the Eurovision Song Contest and broadcast the event in the country. RTVE confirmed its intentions to participate at the 2007 contest on 20 October 2006. In 2006, TVE selected both the artist and song that would compete at the Eurovision Song Contest via an internal selection. For its 2007 entry, RTVE announced on 2 November 2007 that it would organise a national final featuring a competition among several artists and songs.

== Before Eurovision ==
=== Misión Eurovisión ===
Misión Eurovisión was the national final organised by RTVE that took place at Prado del Rey in Pozuelo de Alarcón (Madrid), hosted by Paula Vázquez. The national final consisted of seven shows which commenced on 9 January 2007 and concluded with a winning song and artist during the final on 24 February 2007. All shows were broadcast on La 1 and TVE Internacional.

==== Format ====
Fifty-seven artists competed in Misión Eurovisión which consisted of seven shows: four heats on 9 January 2007, 16 January 2007, 23 January 2007, and 3 February 2007, a semi-final on 10 February 2007, a presentation gala of the candidate songs on 17 February 2007, and the final on 24 February 2007. The heats each featured fifteen artists (twelve in the fourth heat), while the semi-final featured the twenty qualifiers from the heats. Each artist performed original songs or cover versions of songs of their choice during the shows and five qualified from each show. The fourth heat featured an additional four acts which were duets consisting of eight of the artists that competed in the first three heats. The winning duet qualified for the semi-final. In the final, each of the remaining five artists performed five candidate Eurovision songs, selected through an Internet round, with the winner being decided upon over two rounds of voting. In the first round, the top five combinations of artist and song qualified for a second round of voting, during which the winning entry was determined.

The results during the heats and the semi-final shows were decided upon through public televoting and an in-studio expert jury. In the heats and the semi-final, the contestants first faced a regional televote where the top three qualified. The jury then selected an additional two artists (one in the fourth heat) from the remaining artists to advance. For the duet selection, the results were decided upon through public televoting. In the final, the first round results were decided upon through public televoting, while regional televoting exclusively determined the second round results. For the regional televote, the votes of each of the nineteen autonomous communities of Spain created an overall ranking from which a set of points was distributed. A twentieth set of points was based on the votes submitted via mobile phones. The two members of the in-studio jury that evaluated the contestants during the shows were music advisors of the national final: former Eurovision contestants Massiel who won for Spain in 1968, and Mikel Herzog who represented Spain in 1998. Herzog was also responsible for the arrangements of the five candidate Eurovision songs performed in the final.

==== Competing entries ====
Two separate submission periods were open on 14 November 2006 for artists and songwriters to submit their applications and songs. Artists were required to be professional acts, while RTVE sought out mid-tempo and uptempo songs with the chorus containing Spanish words universal for any language or imaginary words easy to be remembered as well as part of the lyrics containing words repeated in English. The deadline for songwriters concluded on 30 December 2006, while the deadline for artists concluded on 15 January 2007. At the conclusion of the submission period, 1,001 songs and 680 artist applications were received. 60 artists were selected by music advisors Massiel and Mikel Herzog for the national final, while an evaluation committee selected fifteen songs for an Internet vote. 48 of the competing acts were announced on 8 January 2007 during a press conference with the remaining twelve artists announced on 30 January 2007, while the competing songs were announced on 11 January 2007. Among the competing artists were former Eurovision entrants Amaya Saizar, who represented Spain in 1984 as part of the group Bravo, and La Década Prodigiosa, which represented Spain in 1988.

==== Artists pre-selection ====
===== Heats =====
The four heat took place on 9 January, 16 January, 23 January, and 3 February 2007. In each heat the fifteen contestants first faced a regional televote where the top three qualified for the semi-final; an additional two qualifiers were selected from the remaining twelve contestants by an in-studio jury. In addition to the performances of the contestants, the fourth heat featured Eurovision guests performers Dana International, who won for Israel in 1998, and Dmitry Koldun who would represent Belarus in 2007.

Public vote qualifier Jury qualifier

Heat 1 – 9 January 2007
R/O	Artist	Song (Original artists)	Points	Place	Result
1	María López	"La Incondicional" (Luis Miguel)	70	7	—N/a
2	Nacho Embid	"Otro amor vendrá" (Lara Fabian)	49	10	—N/a
3	Baltanás	"Te necesito" (Luis Miguel)	92	5	—N/a
4	Amaya Saizar	"Lady, Lady"	81	6	—N/a
5	Katia Ballester	"Unchained Melody" (The Righteous Brothers)	22	14	—N/a
6	Miguel Cañadas	"A puro dolor" (Son by Four)	141	3	Advanced
7	KeKe	"New York, New York" (Liza Minnelli)	40	12	—N/a
8	Santa Fe	"Esto es pa' ti"	195	1	Advanced
9	Juan Ikaro	"Only You" (The Platters)	22	14	—N/a
10	Nessa	"I'm Outta Love" (Anastacia)	149	2	Advanced
11	Ybraem	"Hips Don't Lie" (Shakira ft. Wyclef Jean)	48	11	—N/a
12	Cristina Conde	"Contigo en la Distancia" (Luis Miguel)	30	13	—N/a
13	Póker	"It's My Life" (Bon Jovi)	97	4	Advanced
14	Carmen Míriam	"Gitano" (Abigail Marcet)	54	9	—N/a
15	Gerard	"Sorry Seems to Be the Hardest Word" (Elton John)	70	7	Advanced

Detailed Regional Televoting Results
R/O	Artist	Andalusia	Aragon	Asturias	Balearic Islands	Canary Islands	Cantabria	Castilla–La Mancha	Castile and León	Catalonia	Extremadura	Galicia	Madrid	Murcia	Navarre	Basque Country	La Rioja	Valencia	Ceuta	Melilla	Mobile Phones	Total
1	María López	3	10	10	5	4	2	1	7	3	5	1	8			5				4	2	70
2	Nacho Embid		12			2	1		3	1	3			3	8	3	7	2		3	1	49
3	Baltanás	10	1	4	4	3	10	6	6	4	2		3	6		7	3	7	5	8	3	92
4	Amaya Saizar		3		3		5					5	2	4	10	12	12		8	7	10	81
5	Katia Ballester			3			4	4						2	2		1	1	3	2		22
6	Miguel Cañadas	4	4	8	7	6	8	8	5	5	6	6	4	12	7	6	8	12	7	6	12	141
7	KeKe	2		2		1			8	2			12	1	1			6			5	40
8	Santa Fe	8	7	12	12	8	12	12	12	8	12	12	10	10	12	10	10	10	10	1	7	195
9	Juan Ikaro	5										3	7						2	5		22
10	Nessa	12	6	7	10	7	6	10	10	7	8	7	6	8	4	8	6	8	1	10	8	149
11	Ybraem	1	2	1	2	12	3				4	8	5						6		4	48
12	Cristina Conde	7			6			7		6						1		3				30
13	Póker		5	6	8	10	7	3	4	10	10	10	1	7	3	4	5	4				97
14	Carmen Míriam	6						2	2		1	4			6	2	2	5	12	12		54
15	Gerard		8	5	1	5		5	1	12	7	2		5	5		4		4		6	70

Heat 2 – 16 January 2007
R/O	Artist	Song (Original artists)	Points	Place	Result
1	La Década Prodigiosa	"La chica que yo quiero (Made in Spain)"	69	9	—N/a
2	Agustín Aspa	"Valió la Pena" (Marc Anthony)	11	15	—N/a
3	Mercedes Sayas	"If I Ain't Got You" (Alicia Keys)	96	6	—N/a
4	Nazaret	"Sobreviviré" (Mónica Naranjo)	171	1	Advanced
5	Melo Bakale	"Corazón Espinado" (Santana ft. Maná)	17	14	—N/a
6	Rut Marcos	"Left Outside Alone" (Anastacia)	95	7	—N/a
7	Montse Mallorquín	"Ojos así" (Shakira)	104	3	Advanced
8	Paraelissa	"No me crees" (Efecto Mariposa ft. Javier Ojeda)	72	8	Advanced
9	Mirela	"My Number One" (Helena Paparizou)	164	2	Advanced
10	Hotel Cochambre	"Popurrí"	97	5	—N/a
11	Tahis	"I Wanna Dance With Somebody" (Whitney Houston)	22	13	—N/a
12	Paco Arrojo	"Contra la corriente" (Marc Anthony)	100	4	Advanced
13	Los Amantes	"Tenemos toda la noche"	42	12	—N/a
14	Frank Bravo	"Te quiero, te quiero" (Nino Bravo)	49	11	—N/a
15	Éisac	"Let Me Love You" (Mario)	51	10	—N/a

Detailed Regional Televoting Results
R/O	Artist	Andalusia	Aragon	Asturias	Balearic Islands	Canary Islands	Cantabria	Castilla–La Mancha	Castile and León	Catalonia	Extremadura	Galicia	Madrid	Murcia	Navarre	Basque Country	La Rioja	Valencia	Ceuta	Melilla	Mobile Phones	Total
1	La Década Prodigiosa	8		5	3		5	5	3	2	3	1	8			4	5	4	8	4	1	69
2	Agustín Aspa						2		1	8												11
3	Mercedes Sayas	4	1	2	7	4	4	12		5	2	7	5	6	5	5	4	12	5	3	3	96
4	Nazaret	10	12	10	6	5	12	6	4	3	7	8	3	12	12	12	12	7	12	10	8	171
5	Melo Bakale	5											4				1		2	5		17
6	Rut Marcos			12	5	2	7	1	12	1	1	2		10	8	2	10	1	7	2	12	95
7	Montse Mallorquín		2		12	12	10				10	10		1	10		6	3	10	12	6	104
8	Paraelissa	1	7	6		8		10	6		6	4	10	4		1			1	6	2	72
9	Mirela	7	10	8	10	10	6	8	8	7	8	12	12	8	7	10	8	8		7	10	164
10	Hotel Cochambre	3	8	4	1	6	8		2	10	5	3	2	5	6	3	7	10	6	8		97
11	Tahis		5			1		3		6				7								22
12	Paco Arrojo	6	6	3	4	7	3	7	7	4	12	5	7	2	2	6	3	6	4	1	5	100
13	Los Amantes	2	4	1				4	10				6	3	4	8						42
14	Frank Bravo	12	3	7	2	3	1	2			4				1		2	5	3		4	49
15	Éisac				8				5	12		6	1		3	7		2			7	51

Heat 3 – 23 January 2007
R/O	Artist	Song (Original artists)	Points	Place	Result
1	Just 4 Voices	"El día que me quieras" (Carlos Gardel)	21	12	—N/a
2	Yolanda	"Like a Prayer" (Madonna)	108	5	—N/a
3	Luis Fierro	"Unchain My Heart" (Ray Charles)	15	14	—N/a
4	Lourdes Savarese	"¿A quién le importa?" (Alaska y Dinarama)	4	15	—N/a
5	Paris	"Jaleo" (Ricky Martin)	21	12	—N/a
6	Sheila Rodríguez	"Woman in Love" (Barbra Streisand)	79	7	Advanced
7	Arde Troya	"Drive My Car" (The Beatles)	40	10	—N/a
8	Yanira Figueroa	"Ausencia" (Héctor Lavoe and Willie Colón)	165	2	Advanced
9	Javier Enzo	"Otro día más sin verte" (Jon Secada)	48	9	—N/a
10	The Sweet Metal Band	"Sweet Dreams" (Eurythmics)	63	8	—N/a
11	Javier Ríos	"Vuela muy alto" (Jerry Rivera)	89	6	—N/a
12	Robin	"Enamorada" (Pedro Infante)	27	11	—N/a
13	Rebeca	"Qué no daría yo"	125	4	Advanced
14	Nash	"Stand by Me" (Ben E. King)	216	1	Advanced
15	Marta Llenas	"Proud Mary" (Tina Turner)	139	3	Advanced

Detailed Regional Televoting Results
R/O	Artist	Andalusia	Aragon	Asturias	Balearic Islands	Canary Islands	Cantabria	Castilla–La Mancha	Castile and León	Catalonia	Extremadura	Galicia	Madrid	Murcia	Navarre	Basque Country	La Rioja	Valencia	Ceuta	Melilla	Mobile Phones	Total
1	Just 4 Voices			3		2			2		1		8				4	1				21
2	Yolanda	3	5	5	3	6	8	4	12	1	5	6	6	4	8	8	7	4	2	3	8	108
3	Luis Fierro							5					5					5				15
4	Lourdes Savarese													2	2							4
5	Paris	1		2					1				7			2				8		21
6	Sheila Rodríguez	4	4	4	1	5	1	2	4	10	3	5		5	3	4	10	3	3	2	6	79
7	Arde Troya		2		10	4				2						10			6	5	1	40
8	Yanira Figueroa	10	10	6	7	10	6	8	6	6	12	10	4	7	5	6	12	10	10	10	10	165
9	Javier Enzo	5	3			3	3	7	3	4	10	1	3						4		2	48
10	The Sweet Metal Band	2	6		5		5	3	5	3	6	4	1	3	4	3	3	8	1	1		63
11	Javier Ríos			10	4	1	12			5	2	3		10	12		1		12	12	5	89
12	Robin	8	1	1	2		2	1				2		1	1	1	2	2			3	27
13	Rebeca	7	8	8	8	7	4	6	7	8	7	8	2	8	6	5	6	7	5	4	4	125
14	Nash	12	12	12	12	12	10	12	10	12	8	12	12	12	10	12	8	12	7	7	12	216
15	Marta Llenas	6	7	7	6	8	7	10	8	7	4	7	10	6	7	7	5	6	8	6	7	139

Heat 4: Soloists – 3 February 2007
R/O	Artist	Song (Original artists)	Points	Place	Result
1	Covadonga	"Sin ti no soy nada" (Amaral)	83	9	—N/a
2	Alberto Vázquez	"Ahora te puedes marchar" (Luis Miguel)	93	5	—N/a
3	Davinia	"Ciega, Sordomuda" (Shakira)	95	4	—N/a
4	Crystina	"Mr. Sandman" (Blind Guardian)	85	7	—N/a
5	Diego Cosío	"Invincible" (Carola)	88	6	—N/a
6	Lola King	"Y, ¿Si fuera ella?" (Malú)	43	12	—N/a
7	Rosavil	"La chica de ayer" (Nacha Pop)	64	11	—N/a
8	Luis Amando	"Getsemaní" (Camilo Sesto)	85	7	Advanced
9	Merche Llobera	"Si tú no estás aquí" (Rosana Arbelo)	191	1	Advanced
10	Míriam Roca	"It's Raining Men" (Weather Girls)	113	3	Advanced
11	Fran	"Amor, amor, amor" (Luis Miguel)	154	2	Advanced
12	El Síndrome del Martes	"Mucho mejor" (Los Rodríguez)	66	10	—N/a

Detailed Regional Televoting Results
R/O	Artist	Andalusia	Aragon	Asturias	Balearic Islands	Canary Islands	Cantabria	Castilla–La Mancha	Castile and León	Catalonia	Extremadura	Galicia	Madrid	Murcia	Navarre	Basque Country	La Rioja	Valencia	Ceuta	Melilla	Mobile Phones	Total
1	Covadonga	2	8	12	6		5	12	4		5	1	7	7	8		4				2	83
2	Alberto Vázquez	4	2	6	10	4	1	8	10	2	8	4	10	6		3	3	1	5	6		93
3	Davinia	1	5	5	5	12	4	2	6	1	3	7	6	4	6	5	2	5	4	5	7	95
4	Crystina	5	1	3	3	10	3	7	3	5	4	3	2	3	5	7		8	3	2	8	85
5	Diego Cosío		6		2	6	12		8	7	2	8	1	1	4	6	7	3	7	7	1	88
6	Lola King	12		2	4	1								1	10	5	2	2	4			43
7	Rosavil			1		3	7	6		4		2	3	8	2	2	1	12	8	1	4	64
8	Luis Amando	8	7	4	1		6	1	1	6	12	6	5	2	3	1	6	10		3	3	85
9	Merche Llobera	7	10	8	12	7	10	10	7	8	10	10	12	10	10	12	12	7	12	12	5	191
10	Míriam Roca	6	12	10		5		3	2	10	7	5	4	5		4	8	6	10	10	6	113
11	Fran	10	3	7	7	8	8	5	12	3	1	12	8	12	12	8	10	4	6	8	10	154
12	El Síndrome del Martes	3	4		8	2	2	4	5	12	6				7				1		12	66

Heat 4: Duets – 3 February 2007
R/O	Artist	Song (Original artists)	Result
1	Mirela and Gerard	"Sin ti (Without You)" (Mariah Carey)	Advanced
2	Mercedes Sayas and Baltanás	"One Moment in Time" (Whitney Houston)	—N/a
3	Rebeca and Paco Arrojo	"Si no te hubiera conocido" (Christina Aguilera and Luis Fonsi)	—N/a
4	Rut Marcos and Yolanda	"I'm So Excited" (The Pointer Sisters)	—N/a

===== Semi-final =====
The semi-final took place on 10 February 2007. The twenty contestants first faced a regional televote where the top three qualified for the semi-final; an additional two qualifiers were selected from the remaining seventeen contestants by an in-studio jury.

Public vote qualifier Jury qualifier

Semi-final – 10 February 2007
R/O	Artist	Song (Original artists)	Points	Place	Result
1	Poker	"Gimme! Gimme! Gimme!" (ABBA)	24	13	—N/a
2	Miguel Cañadas	"Nada cambiará mi amor por ti" (George Benson)	38	11	—N/a
3	Nash	"Capaz de todo"	159	2	Qualified
4	Rebeca	"Out Here on My Own" (Irene Cara)	43	10	—N/a
5	Nazaret	"I Will Survive" (Gloria Gaynor)	95	5	Qualified
6	Paraelissa	"Llamando a la tierra" (Steve Miller Band)	22	14	—N/a
7	Gerard	"It's Not Right but It's Okay" (Whitney Houston)	37	12	—N/a
8	Marta Llenas	"Libre" (Greta y los Garbo)	19	15	—N/a
9	Santa Fe	"End of the Road" (Boyz II Men)	19	16	—N/a
10	Mirela	"Sola otra vez" (Eric Carmen)	87	6	Qualified
11	Fran	"Gloria" (Umberto Tozzi)	112	4	—N/a
12	Merche Llobera	"We Are the Champions" (Queen)	129	3	Qualified
13	Míriam Roca	"Toda" (Alejandro Sanz)	45	9	—N/a
14	Yanira Figueroa	"Entender el amor" (Mónica Naranjo)	162	1	Qualified
15	Mirela and Gerard	"Reach Out (I'll Be There)" (Gloria Gaynor)	17	17	—N/a
16	Montse Mallorquín	"Every Breath You Take" (The Police)	52	8	—N/a
17	Paco Arrojo	"A Kind of Magic" (Queen)	72	7	—N/a
18	Nessa	"Holding Out for a Hero" (Bonnie Tyler)	11	18	—N/a
19	Luis Amando	"Kiss" (Prince)	7	20	—N/a
20	Sheila Rodríguez	"Eloise" (Tino Casal)	10	19	—N/a

Detailed Regional Televoting Results
R/O	Artist	Andalusia	Aragon	Asturias	Balearic Islands	Canary Islands	Cantabria	Castilla–La Mancha	Castile and León	Catalonia	Extremadura	Galicia	Madrid	Murcia	Navarre	Basque Country	La Rioja	Valencia	Ceuta	Melilla	Mobile Phones	Total
1	Poker				3	3			4	8		1			1			4				24
2	Miguel Cañadas				2		1	2				2		3		5		12	1	2	8	38
3	Nash	10	2	12	10	10	4	12	10	10	6	10	10	6	6	6		10	6	7	12	159
4	Rebeca	5	1	6		7				4	4		6							10		43
5	Nazaret	7	8	3	4	1	3	4	6	1	5	7	3	4	5	8	5		12	4	5	95
6	Paraelissa						7	6					8				1					22
7	Gerard		6							12					7		6				6	37
8	Marta Llenas						2	1			3		1			4				8		19
9	Santa Fe	2						3	3		1	3	5					2				19
10	Mirela	6	3	2	1	4		10	5	7		6	12	2		7		8	4		10	87
11	Fran	3	10	8	8	2	8	7	12		7	5		10	8	10	8		2		4	112
12	Merche Llobera	4	5	7	12	5	5	5	7	3	10	8	7	12	12	3	7	5	5	6	1	129
13	Míriam Roca			4			6							5	2		3		8	5		45
14	Yanira Figueroa	12	7	10	7	8	12	8	8		8	12	4	8	4	12	10	6	7	12	7	162
15	Mirela and Gerard		4							5			2			2		1			3	17
16	Montse Mallorquín		12	1	5	12			2		2			1	3		12	3	10	1		52
17	Paco Arrojo	1		5	6	6	10		1		12	4		7	10		2		3	3	2	72
18	Nessa	8								2						1						11
19	Luis Amando																	7				7
20	Sheila Rodríguez									6							4					10

==== Songs pre-selection ====
===== Internet vote =====
Internet users had between 15 and 21 January 2007 to vote for their favourite songs via the Misión Eurovisión website and on 24 January 2007, the top five entries qualified for the second round and a committee evaluated the remaining entries and selected an additional five songs for the second round. A committee evaluated the remaining entries and selected an additional five songs for the second round. In the second round, users had until 28 January 2007 to vote for their favourite songs and on 29 January 2007, the top three entries qualified for the national final and an additional two songs were selected from the remaining five songs by the committee.

First round – 23 January 2007
R/O	Song	Songwriter(s)	Result
1	"Busco un hombre"	Alejandro de Pinedo; Juan Carlos Villamil	Advanced
2	"Ya estás aquí"	Luis Fierro; Phil Trim	Advanced
3	"I Love You Mi Vida"	Thomas G:son; Andreas Rickstrand; Tony Sánchez-Ohlsson; Rebeca Pous Del Toro	Advanced
4	"Me gusta hacer canciones con un hey"	Alexandre Rexach Llorens; Mónica Bertrán Brancos	Advanced
5	"Una lágrima"	Ana Luisa Santana; Miguel Ángel García	Advanced
6	"Ley le lee"	Rafael Artesero	Advanced
7	"Rienda suelta a mi corazón"	Benjamín Estacio	—N/a
8	"Angel"	Ignacio Pascual	—N/a
9	"Cuánto amor por ti"	José Abraham Martínez	Advanced
10	"Destiny"	Claes Andreasson; Torbjörn Wassenius	Advanced
11	"Ain veri japi nau"	Juan Luis Santigosa	—N/a
12	"Tu voz se apagará"	Miguel Linde	Advanced
13	"Ven a bailar"	Carmen Hernández; Felipe Segovia	—N/a
14	"Báilame"	Thomas G:son; Tony Sánchez-Ohlsson	—N/a
15	"La reina de la noche"	José Juan Santana Rodríguez; Rafael Artesero	Advanced

Second round – 29 January 2007
R/O	Song	Result
1	"Busco un hombre"	Qualified
2	"Ya estás aquí"	—N/a
3	"I Love You Mi Vida"	Qualified
4	"Me gusta hacer canciones con un hey"	—N/a
5	"Una lágrima"	Qualified
6	"Ley le lee"	—N/a
7	"Cuánto amor por ti"	—N/a
8	"Destiny"	—N/a
9	"Tu voz se apagará"	Qualified
10	"La reina de la noche"	Qualified

===== Songs presentation gala =====
The five selected candidate songs and their authors were presented to the audience at a gala that took place on 17 February 2007. At the show, the five songs were performed by five established guest artists in the following order:

Songs presentation gala – 17 February 2007
R/O	Song	Performer
1	"Busco un hombre"	Massiel
2	"Una lágrima"	Nina
3	"I Love You Mi Vida"	Raúl
4	"La reina de la noche"	Mikel Herzog
5	"Tu voz se apagará"	Gisela

==== Final ====
The final took place on 24 February 2007. The winner was selected over two rounds of voting. In the first round, each of the finalists performed abridged versions of the five candidate Eurovision songs and a public televote exclusively selected the top five combinations of artist and song to advance to the second round, the superfinal. In the superfinal, the winner, "I Love You Mi Vida" performed by Nash, was selected exclusively by regional televoting.

Final – 24 February 2007
R/O	Artist	Song	Result
1	Nash	"Busco una chica"	Advanced
2	Nazaret	"Busco un hombre"	Advanced
3	Yanira Figueroa	"Busco un hombre"	—N/a
4	Mirela	"Busco un hombre"	—N/a
5	Merche Llobera	"Busco un hombre"	—N/a
6	Nazaret	"I Love You Mi Vida"	—N/a
7	Mirela	"I Love You Mi Vida"	—N/a
8	Nash	"I Love You Mi Vida"	Advanced
9	Merche Llobera	"I Love You Mi Vida"	—N/a
10	Yanira Figueroa	"I Love You Mi Vida"	—N/a
11	Nash	"La reina de la noche"	—N/a
12	Mirela	"La reina de la noche"	Advanced
13	Yanira Figueroa	"La reina de la noche"	—N/a
14	Merche Llobera	"La reina de la noche"	—N/a
15	Nazaret	"La reina de la noche"	—N/a
16	Mirela	"Tu voz se apagará"	—N/a
17	Merche Llobera	"Tu voz se apagará"	—N/a
18	Nash	"Tu voz se apagará"	—N/a
19	Nazaret	"Tu voz se apagará"	Advanced
20	Yanira Figueroa	"Tu voz se apagará"	—N/a
21	Merche Llobera	"Una lágrima"	—N/a
22	Nazaret	"Una lágrima"	—N/a
23	Nash	"Una lágrima"	—N/a
24	Yanira Figueroa	"Una lágrima"	—N/a
25	Mirela	"Una lágrima"	—N/a

Superfinal – 24 February 2007
R/O	Artist	Song	Points	Place
1	Nash	"Busco una chica"	20	4
2	Nazaret	"Busco un hombre"	4	5
3	Nash	"I Love You Mi Vida"	85	1
4	Mirela	"La reina de la noche"	67	2
5	Nazaret	"Tu voz se apagará"	44	3

Detailed Regional Televoting Results
R/O	Song	Andalusia	Aragon	Asturias	Balearic Islands	Canary Islands	Cantabria	Castilla–La Mancha	Castile and León	Catalonia	Extremadura	Galicia	Madrid	Murcia	Navarre	Basque Country	La Rioja	Valencia	Ceuta	Melilla	Mobile Phones	Total
1	"Busco una chica"	1	1	1	1	1	1	1	2	2	1	1	1	1	1	1	1	1			1	20
2	"Busco un hombre"																		3	1		4
3	"I Love You Mi Vida"	3	5	5	3	3	5	5	5	3	5	5	3	5	5	5	5	5	2	5	3	85
4	"Tu voz se apagará"	2	2	2	2	2	2	2	1	1	2	2	2	2	3	2	3	2	5	3	2	44
5	"La reina de la noche"	5	3	3	5	5	3	3	3	5	3	3	5	3	2	3	2	3	1	2	5	67

==== Ratings ====
Viewing figures by show
Show	Air date	Avg. viewers (millions)	Avg. share	Ref.
Heat 1	9 January 2007	2.107	13.3%	
Heat 2	16 January 2007	1.417	11.2%	
Heat 3	23 January 2007	1.554	9.7%	
Heat 4	3 February 2007	1.145	9.1%	
Semi-final	10 February 2007	1.215	9.6%	
Songs gala	17 February 2007	1.263	10.4%	
Final	21 February 2007	1.689	14.3%	

=== Preparation ===
The official video of the song was filmed in March 2007 at RTVE's Estudios Buñuel in Madrid. The final version of the song, produced by Mar de Pablos and Carlos Quintero, premiered on 7 March 2007 with the video later released on 9 March 2007 on RTVE's website. The music video served as the official preview video for the Spanish entry. On 21 March 2007, it was announced that Nash would perform at the Eurovision Song Contest under the name D'Nash due to issues with registering their initial stage name.

== At Eurovision ==
According to Eurovision rules, all nations with the exceptions of the host country, the "Big Four" (France, Germany, Spain and the United Kingdom) and the ten highest placed finishers in the 2006 contest are required to qualify from the semi-final in order to compete for the final; the top ten countries from the semi-final progress to the final. As a member of the "Big 4", Spain automatically qualified to compete in the final on 12 May 2007. In addition to their participation in the final, Spain is also required to broadcast and vote in the semi-final on 10 May 2007.

In Spain, both the semi-final and the final were broadcast on La 1 with commentary by Beatriz Pécker. RTVE appointed Ainhoa Arbizu as its spokesperson to announce during the final the Spanish votes. The broadcast of the final was watched by 3.373 million viewers in Spain with a market share of 28%. This represented a decrease of 10.9% from the previous year with 1.339 million less viewers.

=== Final ===
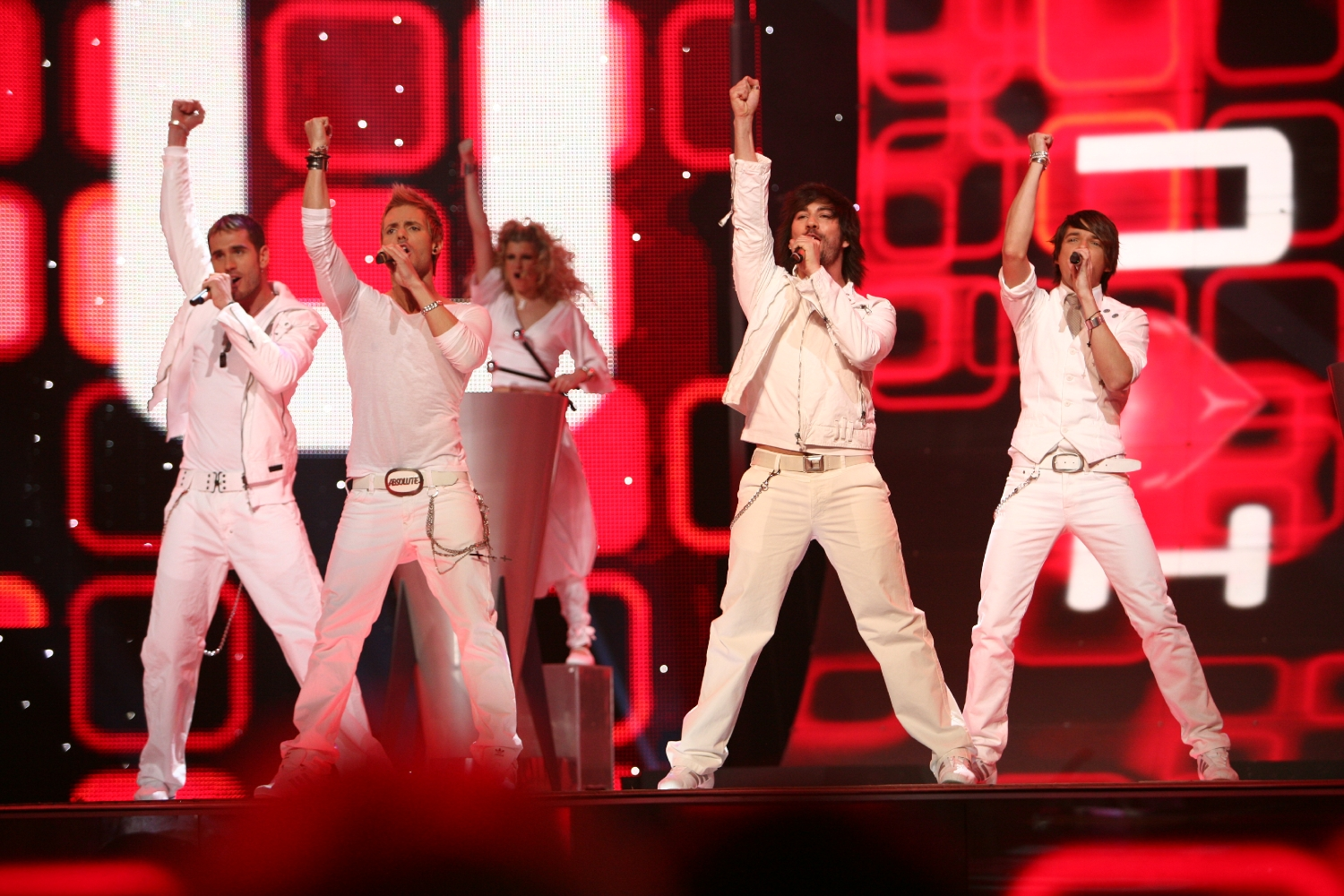
D'Nash performing during the final

D'Nash took part in technical rehearsals on 7 and 8 May, followed by dress rehearsals on 11 and 12 May. During the running order draw for the semi-final and final on 12 March 2007, Spain was placed to perform in position 2 in the final, following the entry from Bosnia and Herzegovina.

The Spanish performance featured the members of D'Nash on stage dressed in white outfits and doing a dance routine, joined by two backing vocalists on silver kettle drums. The LED screens displayed a digital mosaic background which transitioned between blue and red colours, with the latter covered by the title of the song "I Love U Mi Vida". During the performance, D'Nash interpreted the song title in sign language in order for people who can't hear to understand the message of their song, as explained by the group members. The performance also featured pyrotechnic effects which included industrial sparks and flaming columns. The two backing vocalists that joined D'Nash were Noemí Calumarte and Rebeca Rods. Spain placed twentieth in the final, scoring 43 points.

=== Voting ===
Below is a breakdown of points awarded to Spain and awarded by Spain in the semi-final and grand final of the contest. Spain awarded its 12 points to Andorra in the semi-final and to Romania in the final.

==== Points awarded to Spain ====
Points awarded to Spain (Final)
Score	Country
12 points	Albania
10 points	
8 points	Portugal
7 points	
6 points	France
5 points	Switzerland
4 points	Montenegro
3 points	Belgium
2 points	Israel; Malta
1 point	Greece

==== Points awarded by Spain ====
Points awarded by Spain (Semi-final)
Score	Country
12 points	Andorra
10 points	Bulgaria
8 points	Portugal
7 points	Slovenia
6 points	Moldova
5 points	Serbia
4 points	Norway
3 points	Georgia
2 points	Turkey
1 point	Hungary

Points awarded by Spain (Final)
Score	Country
12 points	Romania
10 points	Bulgaria
8 points	Armenia
7 points	Ukraine
6 points	Moldova
5 points	Germany
4 points	Russia
3 points	Slovenia
2 points	Greece
1 point	Serbia
