= Santa Fe (group) =

Santa Fé
- Promotional image for "Cambiemos El Mundo."

Background information
- Also known as: Santa Fㅅe
- Genres: Latin, Pop, Rap, R&B, Dance
- Years active: 2005–present
- Labels: Vale Music
- Members: Ariel Queupumil; Ray Machado; Bea Cesar Llanes
- Past members: Leo Rodríguez; Yoel Villegas
- Website: http://www.santafemusica.com

Santa Fé is a Spanish/English music group. Their sound ranges from modern Latin to Hip-Hop, with some influences from European Electro.

In 2005, they broke out with their hit single "Esto Es Pa Ti", which was featured in the British-film Goal! 2: Living the Dream. The single was featured on several summer mixes, which sales combined totaled over a million units. Their music went on and gained popularity after several television shows including Big Brother VIP.

In 2006, they had their biggest single, "Fruto Prohibido", featuring Spanish singer Soraya.

On January 9, 2007, Santa Fé performed on Misión Eurovisión 2007, a televised contest on TVE1 to determine the musical artist who will represent Spain in the annual Eurovision song contest. They won the 1st place in the first round with a total of 195 (second highest overall) votes, and performed in the semi-finals on February 10, 2007. On February 10, 2007, Santa Fé was eliminated from Misión Eurovisión. A crowd favorite, considered front-runners all along, they did not make a big splash in voting. Although their performance received exceptional crowd reaction, they were not a televoting favorite. They placed 16 out of 20 with 19 points.

In 2008, the Santa Fé released Proyecto Madre, an album they dedicated to mothers. The single "Madre" featured fellow contestants Mario Mendes, Nesa, Miguel Cañadas, and Verónica from Misión Eurovisión, as well as Kesia y Dani Reus of Gospel Factory. The album also produced another single titled "24 Horas."

Santa Fé began work on their first U.S. release after parting ways with members Leo and Yoel, and adding diva Bea Cesar Llanes. Their fourth album is titled Cambiemos El Mundo. The first single is "Si Te Quedas Con El." A video for the single was filmed at the Colony Theater in Miami, Florida.
