= Capaz de Todo =

Studio album by D'Nash
- Released: March 27, 2006 (Spain)
- Recorded: Jun 2005 – Feb 2006
- Genre: Pop
- Length: 46:05 (standard); 1:06:27 (Misión Eurovisión)
- Label: Caes
- Producers: Carlos Quintero and Mar de Pablos

D'Nash chronology
Capaz de Todo (2006)	Todo Va a Cambiar (2007)

Singles from Capaz de Todo
- 1. "Capaz de Todo" Released: February 21, 2006; 2. "Dónde Estás" Released: August 7, 2006

Edición Special cover

Singles from Capaz de Todo (Edición Special)
- 1. "Más Allá de las Estrellas" Released: November 2006

Misión Eurovisión cover

Singles from Capaz de Todo: Misión Eurovisión
- 1. "I Love You Mi Vida" Released: March 27, 2007; 2. "Stand by Me" Released: July 2007

Capaz de Todo (Capable of Everything) is the debut album of the Spanish boy band – D'Nash, previously known as Nash. The original album was released on March 27, 2006 in Spain. After that, the album had been re-released twice.

== Album information ==
Preceded by debut single of the same name, Capaz de Todo was released on March 27, 2006. The album debuted at number 23 in the Spanish albums chart and soon left the chart. Officially, one more single was released from this original album, which was "Dónde Estás".

On November 27, 2006, the album was re-released as a Christmas special under the title Capaz de Todo (Edición Special). The album included two new songs, the Christmas single promoting it, "Más Allá de las Estrellas", and "Qué Sabes del Amor". This edition did not chart in the usual top 50.

After winning the February-held selection of becoming the representatives of Spain in the 2007 Eurovision Song Contest, they re-released the album again on April 17, 2007, with the name Capaz de Todo: Misión Eurovisión. The album was promoted with the Eurovision entry song "I Love You Mi Vida", which landed on the 20th place in the contest. Aside from this song, the Misión Eurovisión version contains 6 songs that do not appear on the first release, including "Qué Sabes del Amor", which was featured on the Special Christmas edition, and the Ben E. King cover "Stand by Me". The latter turned to be their last second and last single from this album. This re-edition landed on number 23 too, as the original album did. It stayed for four more weeks in the top 50 after its release.

All singles released from the album were backed with a music video, except for "Más Allá de las Estrellas" and "Stand by Me".

== Track listings ==
1. "Capaz de Todo" (William Luque, Alejandro Parreño, Gonzalo Parreño, Pablo Torres) – 3:56
2. "Un, Dos, Cuatro" (Vanesa Cortés) – 3:29
3. "Sobrenatural" (Renny Manzano) – 4:13
4. "Lo Haré por Ti" (Fede Monreal) – 3:58
5. "Perversa" (William Luque) – 3:32
6. "Dónde Estás" (P. Assarsson, N. Edberger, J. Fransson, T.M. Larsson, T. Lundgren) – 3:58
7. "Se Cancela" (William Luque, Pablo Torres) – 3:36
8. "Dejarte Ir" (Esteban Camacho, Francisco Colinet, Antonio Ortiz, Michael Sotomayor) – 4:10
9. "Sexy" (Esteban Camacho, Francisco Colinet, Gabriel Oré, Antonio Ortiz, Michael Sotomayor) – 3:11
10. "Siempre Serás" (Penny Manzano, Benny Terán) – 4:47
11. "Escúchame" (Sergio Dominguez, Gabriel Oré) – 3:18
12. "Come to My Party" (Esteban Camacho, Francisco Colinet, Antonio Ortiz, Gonzalo Parreño, Michael Sotomayor, Pablo Torres) – 3:51
- Capaz de Todo (Edición Special)
1. "Capaz de Todo" – 3:56
2. "Un, Dos, Cuatro" – 3:29
3. "Sobrenatural" – 4:13
4. "Qué Sabes del Amor" – 3:34
5. "Lo Haré por Ti" – 3:58
6. "Perversa" – 3:32
7. "Dónde Estás" – 3:58
8. "Se Cancela" – 3:36
9. "Dejarte Ir" – 4:10
10. "Sexy" – 3:11
11. "Siempre Serás" – 4:47
12. "Escúchame" – 3:18
13. "Come to My Party" – 3:51
14. "Más Allá de las Estrellas" – 4:29
- Capaz de Todo: Misión Eurovisión
1. "Capaz de Todo" – 3:56
2. "I Love You Mi Vida" – 3:01
3. "Un, Dos, Cuatro" – 3:29
4. "Sobrenatural" – 4:13
5. "Qué Sabes del Amor" – 3:34
6. "Lo Haré por Ti" – 3:58
7. "Perversa" – 3:32
8. "Dónde Estás" – 3:58
9. "Se Cancela" – 3:36
10. "Dejarte Ir" – 4:10
11. "Sexy" – 3:11
12. "Siempre Serás" – 4:47
13. "Escúchame" – 3:18
14. "Come to My Party" – 3:51
15. "Stand by Me" – 2:02
16. "Busco una Chica" – 2:56
17. "Una Lágrima" – 2:58
18. "Tu Voz Se Apagara" – 2:56
19. "La Reina de la Noche" – 2:59

== Charts, certifications and sales ==
Chart	Country	Provider(s)	Peak position	Certification	Sales/shipments
Spain Album Top 100	Spain	PROMUSICAE	23	–	20,000
