= Todo Va a Cambiar =

Todo va a cambiar

Studio album by D'Nash
- Released: December 4, 2007 (Spain)
- Recorded: 2007
- Genre: Pop
- Length: 41:48
- Label: Caes Records

D'Nash chronology
Capaz de Todo (2006)	Todo va a cambiar (2007)

Singles from Todo va a cambiar
- 1. "Amanda" Released: November 12, 2007

Todo va a cambiar (English: Everything Is Going to Change) is the second album of the Spanish boy band and 2007 representatives of the Eurovision Song Contest D'Nash, previously known as Nash. The album was released on December 4, 2007, in Spain, preceded by Jimmy Jansson-produced first-single "Amanda" in November. The song is a cover version of a song from this year's Swedish Melodifestivalen composed by Thomas G:sson and has been adapted to Spanish by Tony Sanchez Ohlsson.

== Critical reception ==
Professional ratings
Review scores
Source	Rating
TodoRiper	3/5 stars

The album was received with mixed reactions. MusicaMP3 called "Amanda" simple, while pointing out the album shows how much they have grown since Eurovision.

- Zona de Compras:

After a year filled with unforgettable experiences and a tour of concerts that have taken to them by all of Spain, D'Nash already has prepared their second titled disc "Todo Va a Cambiar", an album that shows the evolution to us of the group in all this time and the maturity that it has acquired after stepping on scenes of all the country. First single extracted from this new disc with a spectacular video, titled "Amanda", and is destined to being of the great successes of end of this year.

== Track listing ==
1. "Amanda" – 2:48
2. "Yo por ti, tú por mí" – 3:32
3. "Hasta que me ames" – 3:22
4. "En medio de la calle" – 4:15
5. "Casi" – 3:11
6. "Esta vez sí" – 4:03
7. "Todo va a cambiar" – 3:16
8. "Se me ahoga la vida" – 4:38
9. "Dale" – 2:47
10. "Sígueme" – 3:28
11. "Una vida más" – 3:19
12. "Loco" – 3:09

== Charts, certifications and sales ==
Chart	Country	Provider(s)	Peak position	Certification	Sales/shipments
Spain Album Top 100	Spain	PROMUSICAE	39	-	-
