= List of number-one singles of 2001 (Spain) =

This is a list of the Spanish PROMUSICAE Top 20 Singles number-ones of 2001.

== Chart history ==
Issue date	Song	Artist
1 January	No cambié	Tamara
8 January	Love Don't Cost a Thing	Jennifer Lopez
15 January	Love Don't Cost a Thing	Jennifer Lopez
22 January	Love Don't Cost a Thing	Jennifer Lopez
29 January	La otra orilla (Un pueblo)	Reincidentes
5 February	La otra orilla (Un pueblo)	Reincidentes
12 February	La otra orilla (Un pueblo)	Reincidentes
19 February	La otra orilla (Un pueblo)	Reincidentes
26 February	Carnavalito	King África
5 March	Carnavalito	King África
12 March	Carnavalito	King África
19 March	Carnavalito	King África
26 March	Carnavalito	King África
2 April	Club Tropicana	Gypsy Teens
9 April	Club Tropicana	Gypsy Teens
16 April	What It Feels Like for a Girl	Madonna
23 April	Dream On	Depeche Mode
30 April	Dream On	Depeche Mode
7 May	Dream On	Depeche Mode
14 May	Me gustas tú	Manu Chao
21 May	Me gustas tú	Manu Chao
28 May	Me gustas tú	Manu Chao
4 June	Me gustas tú	Manu Chao
11 June	Prohibida	Raúl
18 June	Prohibida	Raúl
25 June	Prohibida	Raúl
2 July	Prohibida	Raúl
9 July	Prohibida	Raúl
16 July	El baile del gorila	Melody
23 July	Lady Marmalade	Christina Aguilera, Lil' Kim, Mýa and Pink
30 July	Lady Marmalade	Christina Aguilera, Lil' Kim, Mýa and Pink
6 August	Hidden Place	Björk
13 August	Little L	Jamiroquai
20 August	Little L	Jamiroquai
27 August	Little L	Jamiroquai
3 September	Little L	Jamiroquai
10 September	It Began in Afrika	The Chemical Brothers
17 September	It Began in Afrika	The Chemical Brothers
24 September	Can't Get You Out of My Head	Kylie Minogue
1 October	Can't Get You Out of My Head	Kylie Minogue
8 October	You Rock My World	Michael Jackson
15 October	Hero	Enrique Iglesias
22 October	Partiendo la pana	Estopa
29 October	Suerte	Shakira
5 November	Gracias Por La Música	Academia Operacion Triunfo Gala 1
12 November	Lady Marmalade	Academia Operacion Triunfo Gala 2
19 November	Can't Get You Out of My Head	Kylie Minogue
26 November	Can't Get You Out of My Head	Kylie Minogue
3 December	Can't Get You Out of My Head	Kylie Minogue
10 December	And Then There Was Silence	Blind Guardian
17 December	And Then There Was Silence	Blind Guardian
24 December	Can't Get You Out of My Head	Kylie Minogue
31 December	Abre tu sonrisa	Sugarless

== See also ==
- 2001 in music
- List of number-one hits (Spain)
