= A Bailar (Banghra album) =

A bailar!

Studio album by Banghra
- Released: 1 July 2008
- Recorded: 2008
- Genre: Dance-pop
- Label: Vale Music

Banghra chronology
La danza del vientre (2007)	A bailar! (2008)

A bailar! is the second album of Spanish group Banghra after the success of their debut album La danza del vientre. Two singles were released from the album: "Una especie en extincion" and "Unidos".

== Track listing ==
1. Una Especie En Extincion (3:51)
2. Unidos (3:14)
3. Babylon (3:55)
4. Bore-Nâ (3:00)
5. City Light (3:21)
6. Give It Away (4:36)
7. Mi camino negro (3:20)
8. No Time (3:50)
9. Sin ti (3:44)
10. Quedate aqui (3:17)
11. 13th Street (3:20)
12. Una Especie En Extincion (Radio Edit)
13. Unidos (Radio Edit)
14. City Light (Radio Edit)
15. Mi Camino Negro (Radio Edit)

== Charts ==
It was released on Vale Music in July 2008 and reached #54 in August 2008.

Year	Chart pos.	Certification
Year	ESP	Certification
2008	54	
