= Nieves Hidalgo =

Spanish singer

- Born: Nieves Díaz Hidalgo; 19 November 1976 (age 49); Toledo, Castilla-La Mancha, Spain
- Genres: Flamenco, copla, pop

Nieves Díaz Hidalgo (born 19 November 1976) is a Spanish singer known for participating in the Spanish version of The Voice.

== Biography ==
She was born in Toledo, Castilla-La Mancha, Spain.

Her style of music is flamenco although she also interprets copla, rumba or pop. She has sung live for radio Radio Nacional de España, Onda Regional and Torre Pacheco Municipal Radio.

She worked in Japan and Switzerland. She has also sung in various celebrations and parties of Toledo in collaboration with other singers. In 2012 she participated in the talent show The Voice (Telecinco), and was selected by David Bisbal and Melendi. She chose to stay with Bisbal.

As she said in her interview for The Voice, Nieves had had a rather tragic past (losing her daughter and sister) and singing helped her move forward with her life.
