= La danza del vientre =

Studio album by Banghra
- Released: 25 June 2007
- Recorded: 2007
- Genre: Dance-pop
- Label: Vale Music

Banghra chronology
La danza del vientre (2007)	...a bailar! (2008)

La danza del vientre is the debut album of the Spanish musical group Banghra specializing in Oriental and Indian music. The album contains two singles from the band, a trio at the time made up of Javi Mota, Lidia Guevara and Victoria Gómez. They were the debut single "My Own Way" and the follow-up single "Promised Land". After the album was released, Victoria Gómez left the band, making the following release ...a bailar! done by the duo Mota and Guevara.

== Track list ==
1. My Own Way (3:08)
2. Living Without (3:20)
3. The Night Sound (3:05)
4. Promised Land (3:39)
5. Love Forever (2:57)
6. Night Shadows (3:37)
7. Shake to the Beat (3:33)
8. Perfect Nations (3:36)
9. Send Me a Sign (3:03)
10. Never Gonna Go Away (4:00)
11. Magic Place (3:29)
12. Urgente Chill (3:18)
13. Ethnic Voices (5:36)
14. Kundalini Energy (4:03)
15. Intro Banghra (1:32)

== Charts ==
It was released on Vale Music in June 2007 and became a great success, reaching #3 in the Spanish Albums Chart and certified platinum after sale of 110,000 copies in Spain.

Year	Chart pos.	Certification
Year	ESP	Certification
2007	3	Copies sold: 110.000 - Platinum
