= D'Nash =

Spanish band

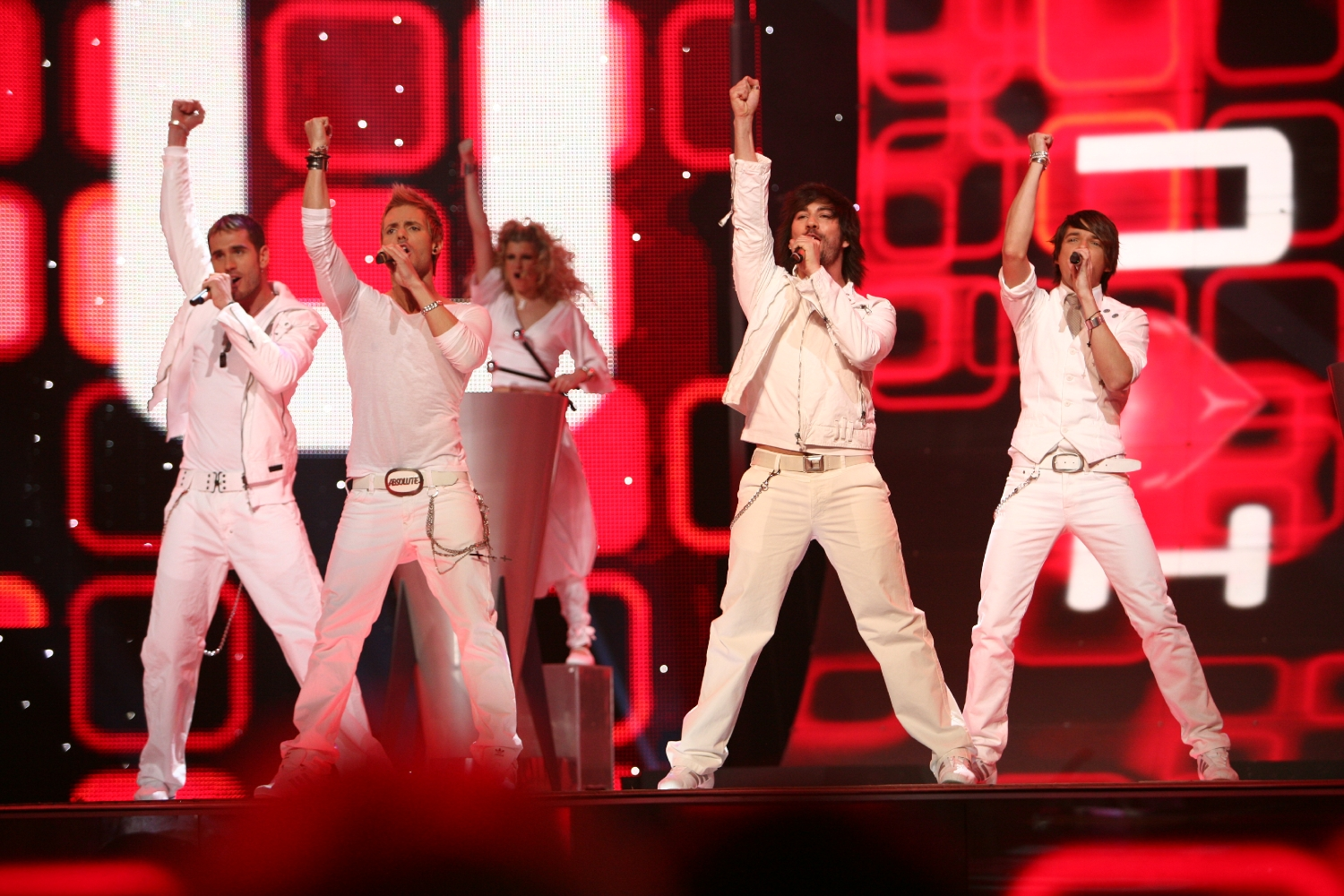
- The band performing "I Love You Mi Vida" at the 2007 Eurovision Song Contest.

Background information
- Origin: Madrid, Spain
- Genres: Pop, R&B, Dance
- Instrument: Vocal
- Years active: 2006 - 2013
- Labels: Sony BMG; Caes
- Past members: Basty (Esteban Piñero Camacho); Mikel (Michael Hennet Sotomayor); Javi (Francisco Javier Álvarez Colinet); Ony (Antonio Martos Ortiz)
- Website: www.dnash.es

D'Nash (often stylized as D'NASH, originally Nash) was a Spanish vocal group, best known for representing Spain in the Eurovision Song Contest 2007.

== Members ==
- Basty – real name: Esteban Piñero Camacho – born 28 February 1981, Cádiz
- Mikel – real name: Michael Hennet Sotomayor – born 20 January 1983, Puerto de la Cruz
- Javi – real name: Francisco Javier Álvarez Colinet – born 30 April 1983, Seville
- Ony – real name: Antonio Martos Ortiz – born 19 February 1981, Valencia

== Biography ==
In February 2006, the band released its first single "Capaz de todo" (English: "Capable of Everything"). The album Capaz de todo was released a month later on March 28. In June 2006, they released a second single, "¿Dónde estás?" ("Where Are You?"), a ballad. Their album was reissued in November with two extra songs, "¿Qué sabes del amor?" ("What Do You Know About Love?") and "Más allá de las estrellas" ("Beyond The Stars"), a Christmas song. The latter became a single promoting the Special Edition.

On 24 February 2007 Nash won Misión Eurovisión 2007, a Spanish TV program searching for the next representative of Spain in the Eurovision Song Contest 2007, which was held on May 12 in Helsinki. Just before entering the competition, they announced a change of name from Nash to D'Nash, due to the existence of a power pop band named The Nash from Mallorca. They entered the competition with the song "I Love You Mi Vida" (literally "I Love You My Darling" but in this case 'my darling' refers to the love interest, making it 'sweetheart'), which ended the night in 20th position (out of 24 competitors) with a total of 43 points.

In April 2007, they re-released their album, with the Eurovision-entry song "I Love You Mi Vida" and the other finalist songs from the preselection ("Una lágrima", "Tu voz se apagará", "La reina de la noche" and "Busco una chica"). Also, a cover of Ben E. King's hit Stand by Me was included on the album and was later released as a promotional single. The album reached number 23 in Spain, selling a total of 30,000 copies.

In November 2007, the band released a new single, "Amanda", which preceded the new album Todo va a cambiar (English: Everything's Going to Change), released on 4 December 2007.This album sold 35.000 copies in Spain.

On 22 July 2008 it was announced that Ony would leave the group after their summer tour ended in September, to pursue a career in musical theatre. Their last performance as a four-piece took place in Fuengirola, Málaga.

The band's three remaining members continued after his departure. The band split up in 2013 due to low sales of their last album Garabatos and Javi started a solo career .

The four original members reunited for a one-off concert in Madrid on 21 December 2014, without ruling out other future projects for the band. In 2016, the band were guest performers at Objetivo Eurovisión, the Spanish national final for the Eurovision Song Contest 2016.

== Discography ==
=== Albums ===
Year	Album details	Peak positions	Sales
Year	Album details	SPA	Sales
2006	Capaz de Todo: Release date: 27 March 2006; Label: Caes Records	23	30.000 copies
2007	Todo Va a Cambiar: Release date: 4 December 2007; Label: Caes Records	39	35.000 copies
2011	Garabatos: Release date: 26 March 2011; Label: Caes Records	49	
"—" denotes releases that did not chart or were not released

=== Singles ===
Year	Single	Album
2006	"Capaz de Todo"	Capaz de Todo
2006	"Dónde Estás"	Capaz de Todo
2006	"Más Allá de las Estrellas"	Capaz de Todo (Edición Special)
2007	"I Love You Mi Vida"	Capaz de Todo (Misión Eurovisión Version)
2007	"Stand by Me"	Capaz de Todo (Misión Eurovisión Version)
2007	"Amanda"	Todo Va a Cambiar
2009	"Amanda" (re-release)	Todo Va a Cambiar
2011	"En el Medio de la Calle"	Garabatos

Preceded by Las Ketchup with "Un Blodymary"	Spain in the Eurovision Song Contest; 2007	Succeeded by Rodolfo Chikilicuatre with "Baila el Chiki-chiki"
