= Banghra =

Spanish pop group

- Origin: Spain
- Genres: Latin Pop
- Years active: 2007–2008
- Labels: Valemusic
- Members: Lidia Guevara (2007–2008); Victoria Gómez (2007); Javi Mota (2007–2008)

Banghra is a Spanish pop group formed in 2007 with members Javi Mota, Lidia Guevara, and Victoria Gómez that tried to reintroduce belly dancing and Indian dance music to the mainstream in catchy songs sung in Spanish and English. The band was formed as a project of producer Sergio Medrano (who had produced Monjes budistas). The group disbanded in 2008 after just 2 albums in 2 years, namely La Danza del Vientre and ...a bailar! and a number of successful singles, the biggest of which was "My Own Way". After split up of Banghra, Javi Mota and Lidia Guevara have both pursued solo music careers.

== Career ==
Singers / dancers Javi Mota, Lydia Guevara and Victoria Gómez started Banghra with aesthetic urban modern sound, making Spanish fans "rediscover" the contemporary belly dance. Being inspired by its movements, they combined music, dances and exercise in all their songs.

In June 2007, their first album, "La Danza del Vientre" (Spanish for belly dance) became a big sensation of the summer charts in Spain, with songs performed in Spanish and English taking the typical oriental / eastern sounds of belly dancing. The album reached position #3 in the Spanish pop charts.

The DVD version included the first video of the group, making of version of the album, plus an informative article that teaches dance choreographies for many of the songs in the album to the listeners plus a photo gallery.

The first single from the album that made the group famous was "My Own Way", that was the top spin sounded in pop radios in Spain. They had also relative success with their second single release from the album entitled "Promised Land". The latter was included in a compilation album entitled Superventas 2008 that included many other dance tunes from various Spanish and international artists.

The band is trying to build on the early success with a second album released in July 2008 entitled "...a bailar!" with a more mainstream pop style than the first album. They released the Spanish language single "Una especie en extinción" which proved to be a much more minor hit than "My Own Way". They followed that with release of the single "Unidos"

== After Banghra ==
After the split up of the group, the members have pursued solo careers.

=== Javi Mota ===
Javi Mota (Javier Mota) is a solo singer and actor. He took part in a bid to represent Spain in the Eurovision Song Contest 2010 to be held in Oslo with the song "Amarte Hoy" written by Roel Garcia and produced by Ivan Vázquez, but failed to qualify.

=== Lidia Guevara ===
Lidia Guevara has also gone solo releasing her single "Nadie como tú"

== Discography ==
=== Albums ===
Year	Títle	Chart pos.	Certification
Year	Títle	ESP	Certification
2007	La danza del vientre: First studio album; Launched: 25 June 2007; Formats: CD+DVD	3	Copies sold: 110.000; Platinum
2008	...a bailar!: Second studio album; Launched: 1 July 2008; Format: CD	54	

=== Singles ===
Year	Single	Chart	Album
Year	Single	ESP	Album
2007	"My Own Way"	14	La danza del vientre
2008	"Promised Land"	-	La danza del vientre
2008	"Una especie en extinción"	27	...a bailar!
2008	"Unidos"	-	...a bailar!

After break-up

- Javi Mota: "Amarte Hoy" (2010) / "Llevaré" (2011)
- Lidia Guevara: "Nadie como tú" (2010)
