= The Day You Went Away: The Best of M2M =

2003 greatest hits album by M2M

Greatest hits album by M2M
- Released: 15 March 2003 (Italy); 5 May 2003 (Taiwan); 8 July 2003 (Thailand); 3 August 2003 (Mexico)
- Recorded: 1999–2001
- Genre: Pop; pop rock
- Length: 75:53
- Label: Atlantic
- Producer: Matt Rowe; Dane DeViller; Sean Hosein; Per Magnusson; David Kreuger; Jimmy Bralower; Peter Zizzo; Kenneth M. Lewis; Craig Kallman; T-Bone Wolk

M2M chronology
The Big Room (2002)	The Day You Went Away: The Best of M2M (2003)

Professional ratings
Review scores
Source	Rating
AllMusic	4/5 stars

The Day You Went Away: The Best of M2M is a greatest-hits compilation album by Norwegian teen-pop duo M2M. It was released in 2003, a year after the group's disbandment.

The compilation includes all singles from their two studio albums Shades of Purple and The Big Room,, as well as acoustic versions of some other songs and popular album tracks. It also contains a Mandarin Chinese version of their song "Pretty Boy", and a Spanish version of "Everything You Do". "Everything" is also shortened without the faded out ending and "Everything You Do" was completely re-recorded with new vocals. It also has the previously unreleased songs "Not to Me" and "Is You". The song "Wait for Me" is also included, and was previously an Australian bonus track for The Big Room. The album included a DVD featuring music videos and a featurette, and footage of M2M in Bangkok and Norway.

Marisa Brown of AllMusic gave the album four out of five stars, concluding, "It's way more M2M than is necessary, but it certainly does the job of giving the best of them." The liner notes include lyrics to the songs; however, there is a mistake in the lyrics for "Don't Say You Love Me". The notes contain the version from the Pokémon: The First Movie, while the album features the version from Shades of Purple.

== Track listing ==
1. "The Day You Went Away" – 3:43
2. "Mirror Mirror" – 3:21
3. "Pretty Boy" – 4:40
4. "Don't Say You Love Me" – 3:46
5. "Everything" (New edit / remix) – 3:07
6. "Everything You Do" (Re-recorded vocals version) – 4:05
7. "Girl In Your Dreams" – 3:40
8. "What You Do About Me" (Remix) – 3:21
9. "Don't" (Acoustic version) – 3:30
10. "Wanna Be Where You Are" – 3:26
11. "Not to Me" – 3:09
12. "Is You" – 4:01
13. "Wait for Me" – 3:06
14. "Jennifer" (Acoustic version) – 2:53
15. "Love Left For Me" (Acoustic version) – 4:14
16. "Pretty Boy" (Mandarin Chinese version) – 4:39
17. "Everything" (Acoustic version) – 3:41
18. "Don't Say You Love Me" (Tin Tin Out Remix) – 3:33
19. "Todo Lo Que Haces" ("Everything You Do" Spanish version) – 4:02
20. "Mirror, Mirror" (Power Dance Remix) – 5:56

== Personnel ==
- Marion Raven – Lead vocals, piano, percussion
- Marit Larsen – vocals, guitar
- Matt Rowe – production, arrangement
- Dane DeViller – production, arrangement
- Sean Hosein – production, arrangement
- Per Magnusson – production, arrangement
- David Kreuger – production, arrangement
- Jimmy Bralower – production, arrangement
- Peter Zizzo – production, arrangement
- Kenneth M. Lewis – production, arrangement
- Craig Kallman – production, arrangement
- T-Bone Wolk – production, arrangement, bass, acoustic guitar, mandolin, organ, wurlitzer
- Dean Sharp – drums, percussion
- Tron Syversion – recording
- John Holbrook – recording, mixing
- Damien Shannon – Assistant engineering
- Jimi K. Bones – slide guitar
- José Ramón Flórez – Spanish translator ("Todo Lo Que Haces")
- Neil Perry – recording
- Joshua – recording production (Norwegian)
