= Sophomore slump =

When a second effort fails to meet the standards of the first

A sophomore slump (also known as a sophomore jinx or sophomore jitters) is when a sophomore fails to live up to the relatively high standards that occurred during freshman year.

It is commonly used to refer to the apathy of students (second year of high school, college or university), the performance of athletes (second season of play), singers/bands (second album), television shows (second seasons), films and video games (sequels/prequels).

In the United Kingdom, the "sophomore slump" is more commonly referred to as "second year blues", particularly when describing university students. In Australia, it is known as "second year syndrome", and is particularly common when referring to professional athletes who have a mediocre second season following a stellar debut.

The phenomenon of a "sophomore slump" can be explained psychologically, where earlier success has a reducing effect on the subsequent effort, but it can also be explained statistically, as an effect of the regression towards the mean, in which an outlier case is followed by a case closer to the average.

== Industry-specific terms ==
In the world of music, there is a common phenomenon known as the sophomore/2nd album curse/syndrome, where newly popular artists often struggle to replicate their initial success with their second album, which is often characterized by struggles in changing musical style. Artists such as Billy Bragg (Talking with the Taxman About Poetry), Dr. Strangely Strange, Black Reindeer, Roddy Ricch (Live Life Fast), M2M (The Big Room) and Jack Harlow (Come Home the Kids Miss You) have referenced the effect in their respective album titles and artwork. American indie rock band Grandaddy used a double entendre for their second album, titled The Sophtware Slump.

In English football, second season syndrome is the phrase that is used to describe a downturn in fortunes for a football club in its second season after its promotion to the Premier League, particularly if the first season after promotion had brought a strong finish. Similar phrases are known in other countries as well: In Germany for example, a common phrase is that "the second year is the most difficult one" ("das zweite Jahr ist das schwerste Jahr"), referencing situations in which a team stayed in their new league in the first year after promotion but struggling to save the league the year after.

== See also ==
- Curse of the rainbow jersey
- Senioritis
- Regression toward the mean
- Second-system effect
