= The Daily Collegian (disambiguation) =

The Daily Collegian could refer to:

- The Daily Collegian, the paper at Penn State University
- The Massachusetts Daily Collegian, the student paper at the University of Massachusetts Amherst
