= Pokémon: The First Movie (soundtrack) =

Soundtrack album for the 1998 anime film of the same name

Pokémon: The First Movie: Music from and Inspired by the Motion Picture

Soundtrack album by Various artists
- Released: November 9, 1999
- Recorded: 1997–1999
- Genres: Pop; pop rock; teen pop; R&B
- Length: 64:47
- Label: Atlantic
- Producers: Garry Hughes; Kaj Robole; Jimmy Bralower; Ron Fair; Neil Jason; Rhett Lawrence; Guy Roche; Eric Foster White; Blessid Union of Souls; Josh Deutsch; Emosia; John Loeffler; 98 Degrees; Todd Chapman; Craig Kallman; Steven Nikolas; Peter Zizzo; Brendon Sibley; Brian Steckler; Harvey Mason Jr.; Gary Carolla; Darren Higman

Singles from Pokémon: The First Movie
- 1. "Don't Say You Love Me" Released: October 11, 1999

Pokémon: The First Movie: Music from and Inspired by the Motion Picture is the soundtrack to the first Pokémon film in the North American markets. Two songs were featured in the animated short Pikachu's Vacation and eight songs were exclusive to the album, not being featured in either the short or the movie. The CD contains extra features, such as Pokémon videos and a screensaver. When it was released, it included a promotion to send in a proof of purchase for an exclusive Jigglypuff card from the Pokémon TCG.

Alongside this soundtrack, the orchestral score from the movie was also released on the CD Pokémon: The First Movie Original Motion Picture Score on May 9, 2000. The soundtrack was released on Atlantic Records, a sister company to Warner Bros., the film's distributor outside Japan.

== Critical reception ==
Professional ratings
Review scores
Source	Rating
AllMusic	3/5 stars
Entertainment Weekly	C+

Entertainment Weekly described the album as a "sticky-sweet grade-school party disc", featuring Top 10 hits, "'N Sync and 98[Degrees]" sound-alikes, and "top 10 wannabes". The reviewer recommended Vitamin C's "Vacation" and Britney Spears's "Soda Pop", describing the former as "slinky-with-surf-guitar" and the latter as "Jamaican-spiced", rather than the "Flashdance"-style "Pokemon Theme" or Baby Spice's latest track.

== Commercial performance ==
The soundtrack was certified double platinum by the Recording Industry Association of America (RIAA) on January 11, 2000 for selling 2,000,000 copies.

== Track listing ==
No.	Title	Writer(s)	Performed by	Length
1.	"Pokémon Theme" (Movie Version)	John Loeffler, John Siegler	Billy Crawford	3:22
2.	"Don't Say You Love Me"	Marion Ravn, Marit Larsen, Peter Zizzo, Jimmy Bralower	M2M	3:46
3.	"It Was You^{**}"	Rodney Jerkins, Fred Jerkins III, LaShawn Daniels, Harvey Mason Jr.	Ashley Ballard with So Plush	4:18
4.	"We're a Miracle"	David Zippel, Christina Aguilera	Christina Aguilera	4:12
5.	"Soda Pop^{**}"	Mikey Bassie, Eric Foster White	Britney Spears	3:23
6.	"Somewhere, Someday^{**}"	Mark Mueller, Andy Goldmark	*NSYNC	4:07
7.	"Get Happy^{**}"	Edele Lynch, Keavy Lynch, Sinéad O'Carroll, Lindsay Armaou, Ray Hedges, Martin Brannigan	B*Witched	3:06
8.	"(Hey You) Free Up Your Mind"	Rhett Lawrence, Melanie Chisholm, Emma Bunton	Emma Bunton	3:24
9.	"Fly with Me^{**}"	98°, S. P. Michel, Jerry Duplessis, Stig Anderson, Björn Ulvaeus, Benny Andersson	98°	3:52
10.	"Lullaby^{**}"	Steven Nikolas, Brendon Sibley, Amanda Williford	Mandah	4:00
11.	"Vacation^{*}"	Colleen Fitzpatrick, Josh Deutsch	Vitamin C	3:20
12.	"Makin' My Way (Any Way That I Can)^{**}"	Diane Warren	Billie Piper	4:25
13.	"Catch Me If You Can^{*}"	Angela Trullinger, Brian M. Steckler	Angela Via	3:28
14.	"(Have Some) Fun with the Funk^{**}"	Steve Lunt	Aaron Carter	3:34
15.	"If Only Tears Could Bring You Back"	Marjorie Maye Pulice, Russ DeSalvo	Midnight Sons	4:03
16.	"Brother My Brother"	John Loeffler, Ralph Schuckett, Emosia	Blessid Union of Souls	3:49

^{*} Songs featured in Pikachu's Vacation, but not in the movie.
^{**} Songs not featured in the movie or the short.

== Personnel ==
- A&R: Mary Gormley
- Product manager: Robert Wieger
- Executive album producer for 4Kids Entertainment: Alfred Kahn, Norman Grossfeld
- Executive album producer for Atlantic Records: Craig Kallman, Darren Higman
- Associate executive producer: Phil Wild
- Production coordinator: Gregg Nadel
- Soundtrack coordinator: Holly Wormworth
- Business: Aileen Atkins
- Mastered by Emily Lazar
- Package design: Martin Ogolter

== Charts ==
=== Weekly charts ===
Chart (1999–2000)	Peak position
Australian Albums (ARIA)	9
Austrian Albums (Ö3 Austria)	8
Belgian Albums (Ultratop Flanders)	27
Belgian Albums (Ultratop Wallonia)	10
Canadian Albums (Billboard)	10
Dutch Albums (Album Top 100)	97
Finnish Albums (Suomen virallinen lista)	17
French Albums (SNEP)	2
German Albums (Offizielle Top 100)	27
New Zealand Albums (RMNZ)	18
Norwegian Albums (VG-lista)	7
Swedish Albums (Sverigetopplistan)	14
Swiss Albums (Schweizer Hitparade)	65
US Billboard 200	8

=== Year-end charts ===
Chart (1999)	Position
Australian Albums (ARIA)	48

Chart (2000)	Position
Australian Albums (ARIA)	64
Belgian Albums (Ultratop Wallonia)	85
French Albums (SNEP)	31
US Billboard 200	72

== Certifications and sales ==
Region	Certification	Certified units/sales
Australia (ARIA)	2× Platinum	140,000^{^}
Canada (Music Canada)	2× Platinum	200,000^{^}
Chile	—	50,000
United Kingdom (BPI)	Gold	100,000^{^}
United States (RIAA)	2× Platinum	2,000,000^{^}
^{^} Shipments figures based on certification alone.

== Score ==
Pokémon: The First Movie Original Motion Picture Score

Soundtrack album by Various artists
- Released: May 9, 2000
- Genre: Film score
- Length: 46:12
- Label: Koch Records
- Producer: John Loeffler

Alongside this soundtrack, the orchestral score from the movie was also released on the CD Pokémon: The First Movie Original Motion Picture Score.

=== Track listing ===
1. "The Birth of Mewtwo"
2. "Dragonite Takes Flight"
3. "Invitation to Danger"
4. "Surviving the Storm"
5. "Mewtwo's Island"
6. "Pokémon Vs. Clone"
7. "Tears of Life"
8. "This Is My World Now"
9. "Three on Three"
10. "Mew's Theme"
11. "Freeing Charizard"
12. "Adventure in Paradise"
13. "All Good Things Must End"

== Sound Picture Box: The Birth of Mewtwo ==
Sound Picture Box: The Birth of Mewtwo (サウンドピクチャーボックス ミュウツーの誕生, Saundopikuchābokkusu myuutsū no tanjō) consists of two discs. The first disc contains episodes of the Japanese radio serial The Birth of Mewtwo (ミュウツーの誕生), released only in Japan and later adapted into The Uncut Story of Mewtwo's Origin. The second disc contains full score of the original Japanese release of the film in addition to two theme songs sung in Japanese.

=== Synopsis ===
The first three episodes of the drama mirror the anime short seen in The Uncut Story of Mewtwo's Origin, describing the circumstances behind Mewtwo's creation under a team of scientists and the tragic loss of his first friend, Amber. However, the last two episodes take place during the start of the first movie, after the prologue ends. The drama also goes into detail the leadership of Team Rocket under Madame Boss and the last known whereabouts of Miyamoto (ミヤモト), the mothers of Team Rocket members Giovanni and Jesse respectively.

=== Track listing ===
Disc one

1. "Episode 1: The Phantom 'Mew'" (第1話 幻の「ミュウ」)
2. "Episode 2: The Birth of Mewtwo" (第2話 ミュウツーの誕生)
3. "Episode 3: Mewtwo and Ai" (第3話 ミュウツーとアイ)
  Also titled "Mewtwo and Amber"
4. "Episode 4: The World's Strongest Pokémon" (第4話 世界最強のポケモン)
5. "Episode 5: Mewtwo Strikes Back" (第5話 ミュウツーの逆襲)

Disc two

1. "The Phantom 'Mew'" (幻の「ミュウ」)
2. "The Awakening of Mewtwo" (ミュウツーの目覚め)
3. "The Mighty Mewtwo" (強者ミュウツー)
4. "Start of the Counterattack" (逆襲のはじまり)
5. "Aim to Be the Pokémon Master '98" (opening theme) (めざせポケモンマスター'98（オープニング主題歌）, Mezase Pokémon Masutā)
  Re-recording of the Japanese opening theme of Pokémon: Indigo League
  Lyrics by Akihito Toda, composed by Hirokazu Tanaka, arranged by Chell Watanabe, sung by Rica Matsumoto
6. "We won't give up on Pikachu" (ピカチュウあきらめないニャ)
7. "Flying Kairyu" (FLYINGカイリュー)
  Also titled "Flying Dragonite"
8. "Messenger" (メッセンジャー)
9. "Sign of the Storm" (嵐の予兆)
10. "Departing for the Pokémon Castle!" (ポケモン城へ出発!)
11. "A Stormy Sea" (嵐の海を)
12. "Pokémon Castle" (ポケモン城)
13. "The Shadow Haunting Team Rocket" (ロケット団につきまとう影)
14. "Mewtwo Appears" (ミュウツー登場)
15. "Cloned Pokémon Awaken!" (コピーポケモン目覚める!)
16. "Showdown! Real vs. Cloned Pokémon" (対決! 本物対コピーポケモン)
17. "Flight of the Poké Balls" (乱れ飛ぶモンスターボール)
18. "Watch Out! Pikachu!" (危うし! ピカチュウ!)
19. "Satoshi's Will to Battle" (サトシ戦いの決意)
20. "Real vs. Cloned! Which Is Stronger!" (本物とコピー! 強いのはどっちだ!)
21. "The Meaning of Life" (命あるもの)
22. "Tears of Miracle" (奇跡の涙)
23. "To the Sky of Hope" (希望の空へ)
24. "The Storm Clears" (晴れゆく嵐)
25. "Together with the Wind" (ending theme) (風といっしょに（エンディング主題歌）, Kaze to issho ni)
  Lyrics by Akihito Toda, composed by Hirokazu Tanaka, arranged by Tanaka and Kan Sawada, sung by Sachiko Kobayashi
