= The Big Room =

- 2002 North American cover

Studio album by M2M
- Released: 9 November 2001
- Recorded: 2001
- Genres: Pop; pop rock
- Length: 36:56
- Label: Atlantic
- Producers: Jimmy Bralower; Peter Zizzo; T-Bone Wolk

M2M chronology
Shades of Purple (2000)	The Big Room (2001)	The Day You Went Away: The Best of M2M (2003)

Singles from The Big Room
- 1. "Everything" Released: October 2001; 2. "What You Do About Me" Released: May 2002; 3. "Don't" Released: June 2002 (promo)

The Big Room is the second international studio album by Norwegian pop music duo M2M. It was released in Asia in November 2001 and in the rest of the world in early 2002. It reached No. 16 in Norway and No. 61 in Australia. Two singles were released worldwide from the album, "Everything", which peaked at No. 6 in Norway and No. 27 in Australia, and "What You Do About Me", which reached No. 46 in Australia.

To promote the album M2M appeared on an episode of the series Dawson's Creek and were selected as the opening act for Jewel's This Way US tour. Despite critical acclaim, sales of The Big Room were considerably lower than their previous album, Shades of Purple, which Verdens Gang attributed to a lacklustre marketing effort by Atlantic Records. Citing disappointing sales, Atlantic chose to replace M2M as Jewel's opening act halfway through the tour, after which they returned to Norway and disbanded.

== Background and composition ==
Interviewed in April 2000 following the success of their debut album Shades of Purple, M2M said that while they were already writing songs for a new album, they had no plans to start recording yet. M2M either wrote or co-wrote all the songs on The Big Room. It was recorded over six days at the Bearsville Studios in New York City. The album takes its title from the main space at the recording facility. M2M dubbed their style "organic pop", as the album featured all real instruments, as opposed to most pop albums which use computerised instruments. Drummer Kenny Aronoff was among the artists who performed the live backing instruments. The Big Room took a different musical direction compared to their first album, replacing their bubblegum pop image with a more mature sound.

In an interview Marion Raven said their songs were always about their experiences and thoughts, and that this album's songs were "mostly about love," though also touched on jealousy and how they see the world. She also said that while their first album was about finding out who they were as everything about recording was new to them, on The Big Room they knew exactly what they wanted, stating "We wanted to make a 'real' album. With a live band in the studio, with our songs and a producer we knew would listen to our ideas."

The album's composition differs between its initial Asian release in 2001 and its worldwide release in 2002. The 2001 release features more pop-oriented remixes of five of the album's tracks, while the worldwide release features a revised track listing alongside the original versions of the songs. Three of these remixes were featured as bonus tracks on the European release of the album.

The song "Everything" is aimed at Zac Hanson, who Marion Raven dated briefly while M2M were on tour with Hanson. According to Raven, once the tour ended he never contacted her, effectively ending the relationship. The song "Miss Popular" is about "that one popular girl in school who goes around bad-mouthing everyone" then eventually "it all comes back to her", while "Jennifer" is about wanting to dislike "the girl your boyfriend is constantly comparing you to" but not being able to as she is a nice person. Raven wrote the song "Leave Me Alone" about a guy who dumped her then wanted her back, and wrote the song "Sometimes" when she was having a really bad day and wanted to just "get it out".

== Release and promotion ==
The album was released in Asia on 9 November 2001 and M2M toured the Philippines in December to promote it. To promote the album M2M filmed an appearance on the episode "100 Light Years from Home" of the TV show Dawson's Creek in late February 2002. The album was released in the US on 26 February 2002 and M2M were planning to promote the album and its lead single, "Everything", starting in early March, however, they were told by Atlantic Records that all promotion in the US had been put on hold until their appearance on Dawson's Creek had aired. Frustrated, M2M returned to Norway after only one week in the US. They spent three days promoting the album in Norway, four days in Spain, one day in the UK, three days in Italy, two days in Germany, two days in Sweden, one day in Denmark and one day in Finland. M2M were disappointed with the amount of time they were given to promote the album in Europe, as ideally they would have liked to spend two weeks promoting the album in the UK alone. Verdens Gang attributed the lacklustre promotion of the album to Atlantic's decision to save money following the drop in record sales in the wake of the September 11 attacks. Atlantic dropped many of their artists following the attacks, and while they kept M2M, the company put little money into promoting their album.

"100 Light Years from Home" aired on April 17 in the US, and M2M were scheduled to recommence promoting the single and album in the US in May, before moving onto Mexico, Australia and Japan. The album was released in Australia on 29 April; M2M arrived in Australia in mid May. They were selected as the opening act for Jewel's US This Way tour, which commenced on 14 June. In mid July, M2M were removed as the opening act by Atlantic, who cited disappointing sales of The Big Room, which at that time had only sold around 100,000 units in the US. Shocked and disappointed by the decision, M2M returned to Norway. The duo broke up later that year, with both Raven and Larsen pursuing solo careers.

=== Singles ===
"Everything" was the first single from the album. A music video for the single, directed by Chris Applebaum, was filmed in Los Angeles in early September 2001. The single was released in Asia in early October 2001 and the US in January 2002. It reached No. 6 in Norway, No. 27 in Australia and No. 44 in New Zealand. The second single was "What You Do About Me". It reached No. 46 in Australia. The track "Don't" was released in the US as a promo single.

== Critical reception ==
Professional ratings
Review scores
Source	Rating
AllMusic	4.5/5 stars
Billboard	Favourable
Entertainment Weekly	B−
Groove.no	5/7 stars
Herald Sun	Favourable
The Massachusetts Daily Collegian	Favourable
The Philippine Star	Favourable
USA Today	2.5/4 stars
The Village Voice	Favourable

The album received a positive critical response. James Hunter of The Village Voice called the album a "pop masterpiece", praising the singing, songwriting and decision to use live backing instruments. Chuck Taylor from Billboard said the album featured "a decidedly mature acoustic pop/rock signature, belying the tender age of the act's two singers", and also gave favourable reviews of both the singles "Everything" and "Don't". John Berge from Norwegian music website Groove.no gave the album five out of seven stars, praising the album's harmonies and saying it was guaranteed to be a hit with young people. Entertainment Weekly gave the album a B−, favourably comparing the uptempo tracks to Hanson though stating M2M's vocal range could not handle the album's ballads.

Elysa Gardner from USA Today gave the album two and a half stars out of four. Saying the duo deserved an "A for effort", she praised their strong vocals and instruments though labelled some of the lyrics as clichéd teenage melodrama. The Philippine Star said the album "retain[ed] the same young, sparkling kind of effervescene that made the group such a huge success". The Massachusetts Daily Collegian gave a favourable review, calling the album "a crystalline example of the heights that teen pop can accomplish".

Karen Tye spoke favourably of the album, saying they had "ditched the cutesy voices and effervescent ditties" and replaced it with acoustic pop and rock which occasionally bordered on country. She praised M2M for using "down-to-earhtunes and thoughtful lyrics" instead of revealing outfits to propel them into the limelight, unlike many of their pop counterparts. Conversely, Stephen Thomas Erlewine from AllMusic was critical of M2M's new image in the album artwork. Erlewine said they had ditched their sweet and innocent look from Shades of Purple, for "lots of makeup, crimped hair [and] fairly low-cut tops". He gave the album four and a half stars out of five, concluding "If M2M needs to play up their good looks to sell an album this pleasing, so be it. This is an album that deserves to find its audience, even through tactics as blatant as that."

== Track listing ==
All tracks are written by Marion Raven and Marit Larsen and produced by Jimmy Bralower, except where noted.

2001 South Asian/South Korean edition
No.	Title	Writer(s)	Producer(s)	Length
1.	"What You Do About Me"	Raven; Larsen; Bralower; Peter Zizzo	Bralower; Zizzo	3:20
2.	"Everything"	Raven; Larsen; Bralower; Peter Zizzo	Bralower; Zizzo	3:06
3.	"Wanna Be Where You Are"	Raven		3:24
4.	"Miss Popular"	Raven; Larsen; Zizzo		2:57
5.	"Jennifer"			3:05
6.	"Don't"			3:26
7.	"Love Left for Me"			4:13
8.	"Payphone"			3:15
9.	"Leave Me Alone"	Raven		3:06
10.	"Sometimes"			2:51
11.	"Eventually"		T-Bone Wolk; Bralower	2:59
Total length:				36:23

2002 American edition
No.	Title	Writer(s)	Producer(s)	Length
1.	"Everything"	Raven; Larsen; Bralower; Zizzo	Bralower; Zizzo	4:11
2.	"Jennifer"			3:08
3.	"Don't"			3:27
4.	"Payphone"			3:16
5.	"What You Do About Me"	Raven; Larsen; Bralower; Zizzo	Bralower; Zizzo	3:05
6.	"Love Left for Me"			4:15
7.	"Miss Popular"	Raven; Larsen; Zizzo		3:06
8.	"Wanna Be Where You Are"	Raven		3:26
9.	"Leave Me Alone"	Raven		3:08
10.	"Sometimes"			2:53
11.	"Eventually"		Wolk; Bralower	3:01
Total length:				36:56

Australian/Japanese bonus track
No.	Title	Length
12.	"Wait for Me"	3:06
Total length:		40:02

European bonus tracks
No.	Title	Writer(s)	Producer(s)	Length
12.	"Everything" (remix)	Raven; Larsen; Bralower; Zizzo	Bralower; Zizzo; Miklós Malek (Note: Producer and remixer.); Levy Thomas Egry (Note: Remixer.)	3:06
13.	"What You Do About Me" (remix)	Raven; Larsen; Bralower; Zizzo	Bralower; Zizzo; Malek; Egry	3:20
14.	"Don't" (remix)	Raven; Larsen; Bralower; Zizzo	Bralower; Zizzo; Malek; Egry	3:26
Total length:				46:48

== Credits and personnel ==
Credits are taken from AllMusic.

M2M
- Marit Larsen – vocals, electric guitar, composer
- Marion Raven – vocals, acoustic guitar, composer
Additional musicians
- Kenny Aronoff – drums, percussion
- Jimmi K. Bones – acoustic guitar, electric guitar
- Miklós Malek – keyboard programming
- Dean Sharp – percussion
- Tom Wolk – bass, acoustic guitar, electric guitar, organ
Production
- Larry Alexander – engineer, mixing, string engineer
- Jill Dell'Abate – string contractor
- Femio Hernández – assistant engineer
- John Holbrook – engineer, mixing
- Ted Jensen – mastering
- Craig Kallman – executive producer
- Tom Lord-Alge – mixing
- Rob Mathes – string arrangements
- Nick Romei – pre-production
- Tron Syversen – engineer
- Peter Zizzo – composer, producer
Artwork
- Aliya Best – art direction, design
- Skye Peyton – photography
- James "Big Jim" Wright – photography

== Charts ==
Chart (2002)	Peak position
Australian Albums (ARIA)	61
Norwegian Albums (VG-lista)	16
