= Everything You Do =

2000 single by M2M

Single by M2M

from the album Shades of Purple
- Released: 5 December 2000 (US)
- Recorded: 1999
- Genre: Dance-pop; bubblegum pop; pop rock
- Length: 4:05
- Label: Atlantic
- Songwriters: Marion Raven; Marit Larsen; Lars Aass
- Producers: Jimmy Bralower; Kenneth M. Lewis

M2M singles chronology
"Mirror Mirror" (2000)	"Everything You Do" (2000)	"Everything" (2001)

Music video
- "Everything You Do" (New Vocal) on YouTube "Everything You Do" on YouTube

"Everything You Do" is a single by Norwegian pop duo M2M, composed of singers Marion Raven and Marit Larsen. It was the third and final single from their debut album Shades of Purple. It peaked at No. 21 on the Billboard Hot Dance Singles Sales.

== Release and appearances ==
M2M recorded the original version of "Everything You Do" in 1999. In mid-2000 the song was re-recorded with new vocals for its single release and was also sung in Spanish, titled "Todo Lo Que Haces", alongside the English version. The official remixes of the song were released in the same year, also using the new vocals. These new vocal versions were then included on special Asian editions of the album released in January 2001 and later released on the group's greatest hits compilation, The Day You Went Away: The Best of M2M. M2M performed the song at a concert at Walt Disney World's Epcot park in February 2000, which aired on an episode of Disney Channel in Concert on 29 April that year.

== Music video ==
The video shows a futuristic prison where two young men in a futuristic cell watch M2M performing on a makeshift television. M2M are shown to be being filmed performing on a television show. One of the men in the cell uses an electronic device to open a liquid doorway between the cell and where M2M are being filmed. Raven and Larsen step through the doorway; when the appear in the cell they are in different blue clothes that match those of the young men. When the security personnel at the prison notice M2M they attempt to apprehend them, though M2M and the young men escape from the facility to where a black car is parked outside. Pursued by the security personnel, the car disappears through a liquid doorway in the road. When the doorway opens in a field, M2M and the young men are now in a white car and dressed in white clothing. The video ends with footage of M2M and the men running happily through the fields. It was directed by Tryan George and filmed in Toronto, Canada. The video was filmed to the radio version with the new vocals, though occasionally a version edited to the original album version was aired.

== Track listing ==
International CD single

1. "Everything You Do" (radio version) – 4:05
2. "Mirror Mirror" (live acoustic) – 3:15
3. "Don't Mess with My Love" (live acoustic) – 3:25

US CD maxi single

1. "Everything You Do" (Groove Brothers Extended Mix) – 5:51
2. "Everything You Do" (Groove Brothers Radio Edit) – 3:53
3. "Everything You Do" (Jonathan Peters Radio Mix) – 3:44
4. "Everything You Do" (Jonathan Peters Club Mix) – 9:12
5. "Everything You Do" (Jonathan Peters Sound Factory Mix) – 9:42
6. "Don't Say You Love Me" (Johnny Vicious Club Mix) – 7:10
7. "Don't Say You Love Me" (Lenny Bertaldo Club Mix) – 6:06
8. "Don't Say You Love Me" (Matt & Vito Mix) – 10:01
9. "Don't Say You Love Me" (Tin Tin Out Remix) – 3:26
10. "Mirror Mirror" (Eddie's Power Dance Mix) – 5:57
11. "Mirror Mirror" (Eddie's Crossover Mix) – 4:13
12. "Don't Say You Love Me" (Johnny Vicious Dub Mix) – 7:04

== Personnel ==
"Everything You Do" (original and re-recorded vocals versions)

- Marit Larsen – vocals, acoustic guitar
- Marion Raven – vocals, percussion
- Jan van Ravens – guitar
- Bottolf Lødemel – keyboards
- Tom Lord-Alge – mixing
- Gaute Storås – string arrangement
- Jimmy Bralower – producer, drum programming
- Kenneth M. Lewis – producer, additional programming
- Oslo Philharmonic Orchestra – strings

"Todo Lo Que Haces"

- Marion Raven – vocals, writer
- Marit Larsen – vocals, writer
- Lars Aass – writer
- Jose Ramon Florez – lyrics
- Neil Perry – recorder

== Charts ==
Chart (2001)	Peak position
Hot Dance Singles Sales	21
