= Don't Say You Love Me (M2M song) =

1999 single by M2M

- UK and European single

Single by M2M

from the album Pokémon: The First Movie soundtrack and Shades of Purple
- B-side: "The Feeling Is Gone"
- Released: 11 October 1999
- Recorded: 1999
- Genre: Bubblegum pop
- Length: 3:46 (album version); 3:43 (Pokémon version); 3:17 (acoustic version)
- Label: Atlantic
- Songwriters: Marion Raven; Marit Larsen; Peter Zizzo; Jimmy Bralower
- Producers: Peter Zizzo; Jimmy Bralower

M2M singles chronology
"Don't Say You Love Me" (1999)	"Mirror Mirror" (2000)

Music video
- "Don't Say You Love Me" on YouTube; "Don't Say You Love Me" (Pokémon version) on YouTube

"Don't Say You Love Me" is the debut single of M2M, a Norwegian pop duo consisting of singers Marion Raven and Marit Larsen. The song first appeared on Radio Disney before its official US radio and single release in October 1999. It was released on the soundtrack to the film Pokémon: The First Movie in November 1999 and appears in the film's closing credits. The song was included on M2M's debut album, Shades of Purple (2000), as its opening track, and later appeared on their compilation album The Day You Went Away: The Best of M2M (2003).

The song received positive reviews. Chuck Taylor from Billboard said it was "absolutely enchanting" and would appeal to both young and mature listeners. It reached number 2 in Norway, number 4 in both Australia and New Zealand, number 16 in the UK and number 21 on the US Billboard Hot 100. It was certified gold in the US and Australia and remained M2M's biggest hit. M2M performed the song on episodes of the television series One World, Top of the Pops and Disney Channel in Concert. Two similar music videos were released for the song, with one showing clips from Pokémon: The First Movie.

== Background and composition ==
Marion Raven and Marit Larsen come from Lørenskog in the district east of Oslo, Norway. They met when they were five years old and became best friends, discovering they had similar interests in music. They began singing together and performing in musical productions. The duo released a children's album, Synger Kjente Barnesanger (Sing Famous Children's Songs), in 1996 under the band name Marit & Marion, when Larsen was 12 and Raven was 11 years old. The album was nominated for a Spellemannprisen award. After the album's release they started writing their own pop songs and sent demo recordings out; one of the demos ended up at Atlantic Records and they were signed to a worldwide contract in 1998. They held a competition for fans to come up with a new name for their duo, and one girl suggested M2M. Raven and Larsen were 14 and 15 years old, respectively, when they recorded the tracks from their debut album Shades of Purple, including their debut single, "Don't Say You Love Me".

"Don't Say You Love Me"
The lyrics are sung from the point of view of a girl who tells her date she is not prepared to hear that "he loves her – after all, 'It's not like we're gonna get married'."

The music and lyrics were written by Raven, Larsen, Peter Zizzo and Jimmy Bralower. It was produced by Zizzo and Bralower and was mixed by Tom Lord-Alge. "Don't Say You Love Me" is performed in a 4/4 time signature at a moderately slow tempo of 100 beats per minute. Raven and Larsen alternate singing lead vocals for the first two verses, and then sing harmony together during the choruses. For most of the song, the verses are in the key of C♯ minor and the choruses are in the relative major key of E major. The final chorus has a key change to F♯ major. The song's prominent instruments are electric piano and acoustic guitar, with record scratching sounds layering the production in the chorus in a style akin to Hanson's "MMMBop". The final chorus repeats with ad-libbed background vocals until the song fades out.

Lyrically, the song is about getting "the rules straight on a budding relationship: Slow down and don't say you love me until you give me some time and get to know me." According to musicologist Jon Mikkel Broch Ålvik, "Don't Say You Love Me" is the "thinking person's teen pop." Ålvik rejects a superficial interpretation that the lyrics are a "moralistic message of abstinence", arguing instead that M2M "signal a stance that sounds considered and assured rather than prudish" and that the song is a statement of "burgeoning agency." The song has been described as bubblegum pop music with similar lyrical qualities to songs by girl groups of the 1960s, while also having more influence from rock and singer-songwriter genres than was typical for other teen pop songs of the late 1990s.

There is a slight difference in lyrics between the version used in Pokémon: The First Movie version and the one released on Shades of Purple. The Shades of Purple version includes the line "you start kissing me, what's that about?" In the Pokémon version, the lyric is "you said you love me, what's that about?" When asked about the lyric change in an interview, M2M replied "the Pokémon people didn't find it appropriate to have kissing in the lyrics, because it was for younger kids. We think [the lyric change] was stupid. The original version is on [Shades of Purple], and that's the one we wanted to go with." M2M had not heard of Pokémon until the song was chosen for the soundtrack, as the franchise was not yet popular in Norway.

== Release and appearances ==
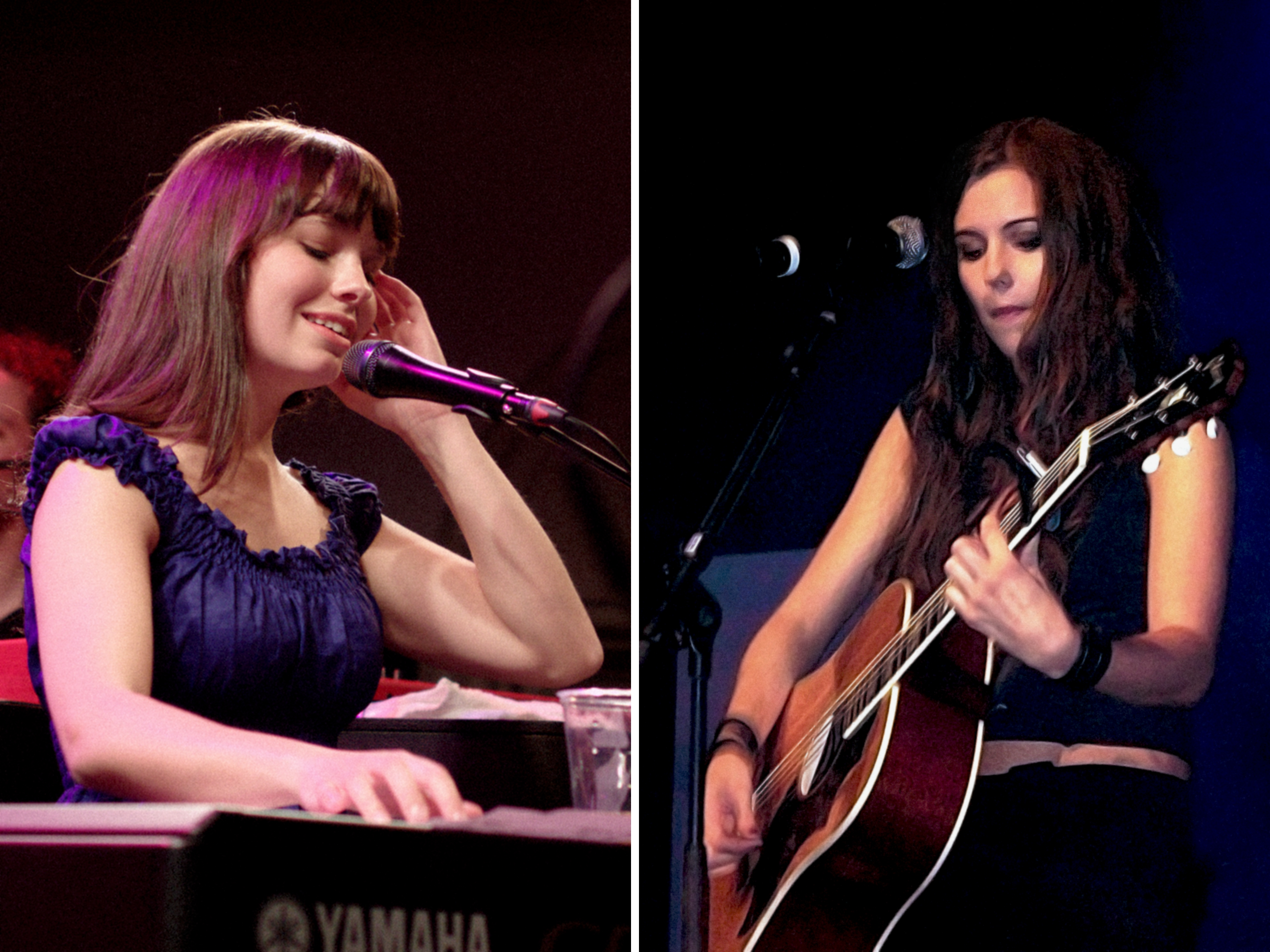
Larsen (pictured in 2009) and Raven (pictured in 2007) toured the US and Asia to promote the single

"Don't Say You Love Me" appeared in "The List", an episode in the TV series Felicity that aired in the US on 3 October 1999 and reached an audience of 5 million people, helping to generate interest in the song. On 10 October it appeared in the Jack & Jill episode "Moving On". The song was recently being played on Radio Disney before it made its commercial US debut on 26 October 1999 as a CD and Compact Cassette. In Canada, it was released on the same day. Prior to this, the track was officially serviced to US adult contemporary radio on 11 October 1999 and to mainstream pop and rhythmic radio the following day. Within a month, more than 100 US top-40 radio stations were playing the song; by 10 November it was the sixth-most requested song on New York radio stations. The song appeared during the closing credits of the film Pokémon: The First Movie – Mewtwo Strikes Back and on the film's soundtrack; both the film and soundtrack were released in the US on 10 November 1999. "Don't Say You Love Me" was the debut single from the album. The single first entered the charts in the US on 20 November, by which time more than 400,000 units had already been shipped to record stores.

Despite the success in the US, in November 1999 it was reported that the single would not be released in the duo's home country of Norway until the following year, as Warner Music Norway wanted to wait until both the Pokémon film and soundtrack were released in Europe to capitalise on the exposure. The single was released in Norway on radio on 24 November, and by 11 January it was on sale in Norway and 25 other countries in Europe, the Americas, Asia and Oceania. It was expected to be released in the remaining European countries by the end of the month, though European countries where the single had not yet been released were already playing the song on the radio. The song was popular in Southeast Asia, receiving heavy airplay in Korea, Indonesia, the Philippines, Thailand and Singapore, and also in South America; in late May 2000 in Mexico it was the best selling foreign song and the second best selling song overall. On 12 January it appeared in an episode of Beverly Hills, 90210, "Tainted Love". The song was released in Japan on 25 January, in Spain on 22 February, and in the UK on 20 March on East West Records. It appeared on Shades of Purple, which was released in Europe in mid-February and the US on 7 March, and in 2003 it appeared on the album The Day You Went Away: The Best of M2M.

== Reception ==
Robert Christgau gave a positive review, calling the song one of the "impossibly touching" tracks on Shades of Purple that "sets the standard" for the rest of the album. Chuck Taylor from Billboard said the song would appeal to both the young and mature listeners as it "neatly walks the line between pure pop and the cusp of the adult top 40". He added the song was "Absolutely enchanting in its youthful vocal and meaty series of hooks". Michael Paoletta, also from Billboard, called the song an "infectious pop rocker", adding that "what's most dazzling about the track is the vocal verve of the girls' harmonizing." Heather Phares from AllMusic referred to the song as "sweet yet down-to-earth pop". Marius Lillelien, the director of the Norwegian radio station NRK P3, said "It's a very well-written, well-produced pop song, they're young and potentially the largest Norwegian pop success ever. The song is best suited to an audience aged 10–16, but in my opinion it won't scare away older listeners". "Don't Say You Love Me" was nominated for the year's best song at the 2000 Spellemannprisen awards, though it lost to Propaganda by Briskeby.

In the US, "Don't Say You Love Me" entered the Billboard Hot 100 at number 72, later peaking at number 21. It also reached number 40 on both the Latin Pop Airplay and Tropical Songs charts. The single sold 39,000 copies in the week preceding 27 November, and had sold 580,000 units by May 2000. It reached number 2 in their native Norway and number 4 in both Australia and New Zealand. It made the top 10 in Finland, the top 20 in Canada, the UK, Ireland, Sweden and the Netherlands, the top 40 in Italy and Belgium and the top 80 in Germany, France and Switzerland. It was certified gold in the US on 6 December 1999 and in Australia in 2000.

"Don't Say You Love Me" was M2M's biggest hit and is their most recognisable song. While their next single, "Mirror Mirror", was a top 40 single in Australia and Canada, and reached number 62 on the Billboard Hot 100, "Don't Say You Love Me" would remain M2M's only top-40 hit in the US, and their only hit at all in many other countries. The song has been called a one-hit wonder. While speaking favourably of the duo, in 2014 Abby Devora from MTV ranked M2M and the song at number 2 on her list "9 Girl Group One-Hit Wonders You Need To Remember Right Now". Jessica Booth from Gurl.com included the duo and song in her 2012 list "Flashback: 15 Old-School Girl Singers We Miss", calling the song "ridiculously catchy". Kaitlin Cubria from Teen.com listed the duo and song in her 2014 list of "12 forgotten girl groups from the '90s/'00s that are worth your time." In 2014, Nathan Jolly from MAX said it was "one of those few pop songs that is happiness incarnate despite being a 'back the fuck off, dude' anthem". In 2020, Taylor Swift included "Don't Say You Love Me" in a Spotify playlist of 51 songs by female artists to commemorate Women's History Month, describing all the artists she selected as "faraway mentors who taught me how music could make someone's life easier and more magical".

== Music video ==
Raven and Larsen perform at the drive-in as popcorn falls around them

The accompanying music video for "Don't Say You Love Me" was directed by Nigel Dick and was filmed from 4 until 6 October 1999 at the Mission Tiki drive-in theatre in Montclair, California. In the video, Raven sings the song while she is in a car with a boy, while Larsen sings and plays the guitar in front of another car. This footage is spliced with M2M singing together at the drive-in, people dancing, the projectionist struggling with his malfunctioning equipment, and the concession stand worker who has an overflowing popcorn maker. When the popcorn stand explodes, M2M continue to perform surrounded by people as popcorn rains down. Air cannons were used to fire 200 garbage bin-sized bags of popcorn into the air to create the raining popcorn effect. In the US, the music video made its premiere on 24 October on The WB following that night's screening of 7th Heaven. It began airing on The Box and MuchMusic in early November 1999 and began airing on MTV on 15 November.

Two similar versions of the video were released. In one, clips from Pokémon: The First Movie – Mewtwo Strikes Back are played on the screen at the drive-in theatre. In the other version, fewer images of the screen are shown; when they are seen the Pokémon images are replaced with either clips of Raven and Larsen singing the song or words such as "M2M" and "Intermission". The Pokémon version of the video uses the edited-out lyrics, while the other one uses the album version of the song. The Pokémon version was included on the DVD of the film, while the other version was included on the bonus disc in The Day You Went Away: The Best of M2M.

== Live performances, covers and re-release ==
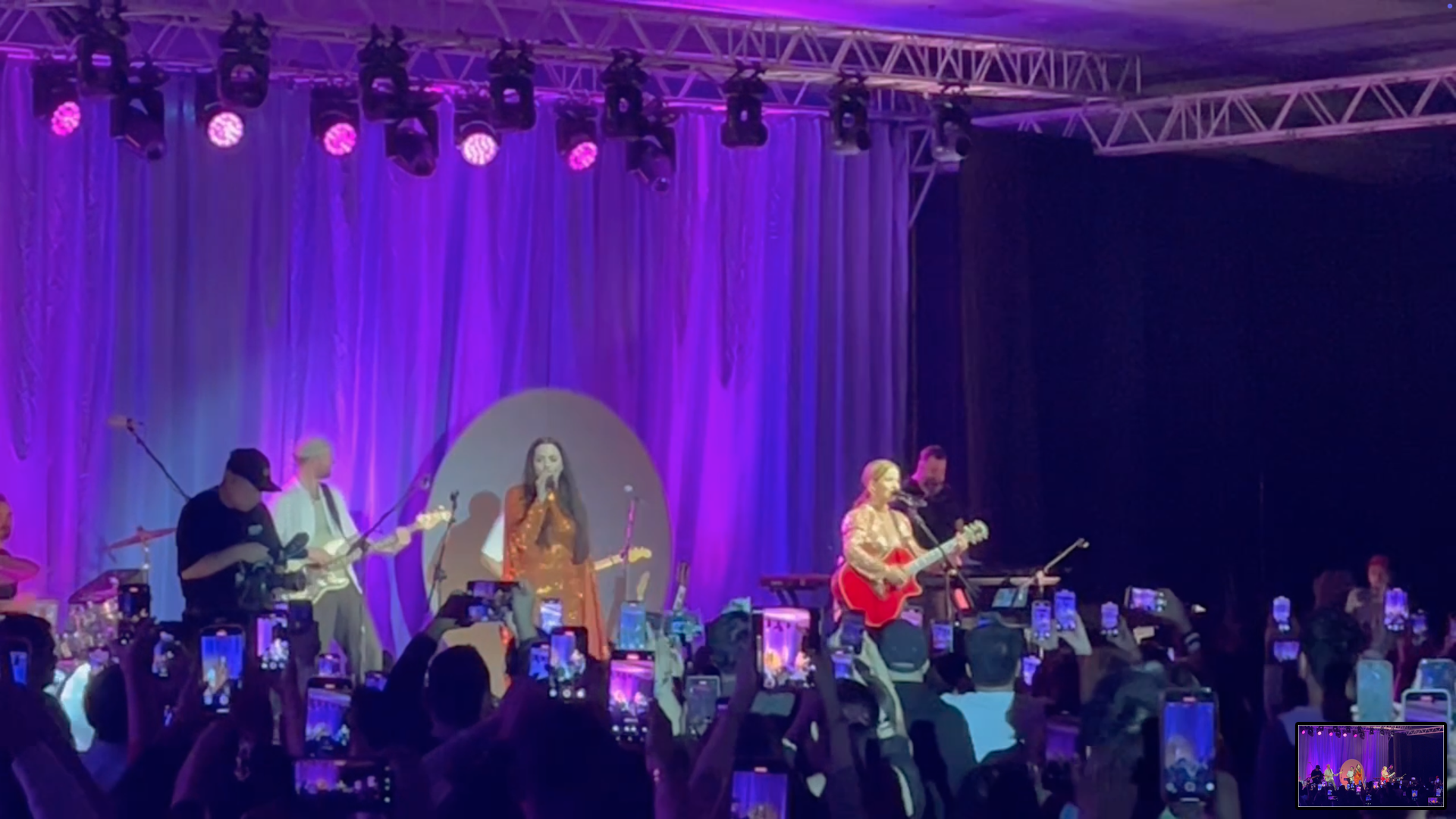
M2M performing the song during their 2025 Better Endings tour in Davao, Philippines

To promote the single Raven and Larsen made a six-stop tour of shopping malls in the Northeastern US between 21 August and 2 October; it was their first tour under the name M2M. On 9 November 1999, the day before Pokémon: The First Movie – Mewtwo Strikes Back was released, M2M performed the song live at the Warner Bros. Studio Store on Fifth Avenue, Manhattan, in front of fans and a large media presence. To promote the single M2M also toured Singapore, Hong Kong, Philippines and Japan before returning to Norway on 24 November. They performed the song on the episode "Band on the Run" of the TV series One World, which aired on 27 November, and on 31 March 2000 they performed it on Top of the Pops. M2M performed the song live at Walt Disney World's Epcot park on 12 February 2000. This performance was recorded and appeared on an episode of Disney Channel in Concert on 29 April, which focused on both M2M and BBMak. As their biggest hit, "Don't Say You Love Me" was a popular song during live performances. In December 2001 the song was performed as an encore, along with "Everything You Do", in front of a crowd of 4,000 at an M2M concert in Kuala Lumpur.

Raven and Larsen ceased performing as M2M in 2002, and both went on to pursue solo careers; Larsen is known for performing a country music version of the song during solo performances. M2M reunited in 2024, and the following year released their first recording in over 20 years, the EP Still in My Dreams, which included a re-worked acoustic version of "Don't Say You Love Me". M2M performed the Better Endings Tour in seven countries in 2025, with "Don't Say You Love Me" being the final song in their 18-song set.

The Filipino acoustic pop duo Krissy & Ericka covered the Pokémon soundtrack version of the song on their 2009 self-titled album.

== Track listings ==
The European version of the single contains the B-side track "The Feeling Is Gone", one of three tracks recorded for Shades of Purple which were left off the US version of the album. The standard US version includes the Pokémon: The First Movie – Mewtwo Strikes Back instrumental score "Mewtwo Strikes Back Suite" as the B-side.

- Australian CD single
1. "Don't Say You Love Me" – 3:46
2. "If Only Tears Could Bring You Back" by Midnight Sons – 4:03
3. "Mewtwo Strikes Back Suite" – 4:51
4. Enhanced section: "Don't Say You Love Me" (music video) – 3:38
- US single
1. "Don't Say You Love Me" (film version) – 3:46
2. "Mewtwo Strikes Back Suite" – 4:51
- US maxi-CD single
1. "Don't Say You Love Me" (Tin Tin Out Remix) – 3:33
2. "Don't Say You Love Me" (Lenny Bertoldo Radio Mix) – 3:01
3. "Don't Say You Love Me" (acoustic version) – 3:15
4. "Don't Say You Love Me" (album version) – 3:46
- Japanese maxi-CD single
1. "Don't Say You Love Me" (album version) – 3:46
2. "Don't Say You Love Me" (Tin Tin Out Remix) – 3:33
3. "Don't Say You Love Me" (acoustic version) – 3:15
4. "The Feeling Is Gone" – 3:16 (non-album bonus track)
5. "Don't Say You Love Me" (karaoke version) – 4:06
- European maxi-CD single
1. "Don't Say You Love Me" (album version) – 3:46
2. "The Feeling Is Gone" – 3:16
3. "Don't Say You Love Me" (acoustic version) – 3:15

== Charts ==
=== Weekly charts ===
Weekly chart performance for "Don't Say You Love Me"
Chart (1999–2000)	Peak position
Australia (ARIA)	4
Belgium (Ultratop 50 Flanders)	31
Belgium (Ultratop 50 Wallonia)	37
Canada Top Singles (RPM)	36
Canada Adult Contemporary (RPM)	67
Denmark (IFPI)	9
Europe (Eurochart Hot 100)	41
Finland (Suomen virallinen lista)	10
France (SNEP)	60
Germany (GfK)	80
Ireland (IRMA)	12
Italy (FIMI)	27
Italy Airplay (Music & Media)	8
Netherlands (Dutch Top 40)	15
Netherlands (Single Top 100)	16
New Zealand (Recorded Music NZ)	4
Norway (VG-lista)	2
Scottish Singles Sales (Official Charts)	13
Sweden (Sverigetopplistan)	17
Switzerland (Schweizer Hitparade)	76
UK Singles (Official Charts)	16
US Billboard Hot 100	21

=== Year-end charts ===
Year-end chart performance for "Don't Say You Love Me"
Chart (2000)	Position
Australia (ARIA)	92
Netherlands (Dutch Top 40)	94

== Certifications ==
Certifications and sales for "Don't Say You Love Me"
Region	Certification	Certified units/sales
Australia (ARIA)	Gold	35,000^{^}
United States (RIAA)	Gold	500,000^{^}
^{^} Shipments figures based on certification alone.

== Release history ==
Release dates and formats for "Don't Say You Love Me"
Region	Date	Format(s)	Label(s)	Ref(s).
United States	11 October 1999	Adult contemporary radio	Atlantic	
United States	12 October 1999	Pop; rhythmic radio	Atlantic	
United States	26 October 1999	CD; cassette	Atlantic	
Canada	26 October 1999	CD	Atlantic	
Norway	24 November 1999	Radio	Atlantic	
New Zealand	13 December 1999	CD; cassette	Atlantic	
Japan	25 January 2000	CD	Atlantic	
Spain	22 February 2000	CD	Atlantic	
United Kingdom	20 March 2000	CD	Atlantic; East West	
