= Shades of Purple =

Studio album by M2M
- Released: 7 March 2000
- Recorded: 1999
- Genres: Bubblegum pop; teen pop
- Length: 51:07
- Label: Atlantic
- Producers: Jimmy Bralower; Robert "Esmail" Jazayeri; Dane DeViller; Full Force; Sean Hosein; David Kreuger; Per Magnusson; Max Martin; Matt Rowe; Peter Zizzo

M2M chronology
| Synger Kjente Barnesanger (1996) | Shades of Purple (2000) | The Big Room (2001) |

Alternative cover
- Asian edition cover

Singles from Shades of Purple
- 1. "Don't Say You Love Me" Released: 11 October 1999; 2. "Mirror Mirror" Released: 22 February 2000; 3. "Pretty Boy" Released: 4 August 2000; 4. "Everything You Do" Released: 5 December 2000; 5. "The Day You Went Away" Released: 1 January 2001; 6. "Girl in Your Dreams" Released: March 2001, limited release in Asia

Shades of Purple is an album by Norwegian pop duo M2M. It is their first international album under the name M2M and the second album by the duo. It was released in the US on 7 March 2000 by Atlantic Records, and reached No. 7 in Norway, No. 89 on the US Billboard 200 and No. 1 on the US Top Heatseekers chart. The single "Don't Say You Love Me", which had already been released as the lead single of the Pokémon: The First Movie soundtrack in October 1999, appears on the album. A further two singles, "Mirror Mirror" and "Everything You Do", were released throughout 2000.

The album received a positive critical response. Robert Christgau gave the album an 'A−', praising the duo's singing. Michael Paoletta from Billboard said it was "poised to be the soundtrack of spring/summer 2000." Shades of Purple sold over 1.5 million units worldwide and was nominated for Best Pop Album at the 2000 Spellemannprisen awards.

== Background and composition ==
Marion Raven and Marit Larsen come from Lørenskog in the district east of Oslo. They became friends at age five, and formed their own band when they were eight. They released a children's album, Synger Kjente Barnesanger, under the band name "Marit & Marion", which was nominated for a Spellemannprisen award when they were both 12 years old. They continued writing pop songs and sent demo recordings out. One of the demos ended up at Atlantic Records and they were signed to a worldwide contract in 1998, after which they shortened their name to M2M, which reflects the initials of both their first names.

The album was recorded in London, Sweden and New York, when Raven was 14 and Larsen was 15. Raven and Larsen co-wrote most of the songs on the album. "Girl in Your Dreams" was the first song Raven had ever written. She wrote it when she was 13 about a boy she liked that was not interested in her. The pair wrote over 30 songs in anticipation of recording; 16 of these were recorded, and 13 made it onto the US version of the album. One of the unreleased songs, "The Feeling is Gone", was released as a B-side on the European and Japanese single versions of "Don't Say You Love Me", and also appears on the Australian version of the album.

The track "Our Song" uses the chorus of the Bee Gees' hit single "Too Much Heaven" as its own chorus. Raven and Larsen had previously been unaware of "Too Much Heaven"; the chorus was added at the suggestion of their producer. When questioned about the album title, M2M replied that purple was their favourite colour and they wanted "a title that expressed that the album is us and through our eyes."

== Release and promotion ==
The album was released in both Europe and Asia in mid-February 2000 and the US on 7 March. It had been released worldwide by the end of March, except in Sweden where a shipment of 20,000 copies was delayed for at least four weeks due to a legal dispute with a local band there that also used the name "M2M".

In December 1999 Warner Music Group, which owns Atlantic Records, stated they expected to sell at least five to six million copies of Shades of Purple. Sales had exceeded one million by September 2000, though investors were disappointed as they had not yet recuperated the amount they had spent promoting the duo; they expected to break even before the end of the year. The album sold 107,000 units in its opening week in the US, debuting at number one on the Billboard Top Heatseekers chart and reached number 89 on the US Billboard 200, staying on the chart for sixteen weeks, and had sold 268,000 units there by March 2002. Worldwide sales of the album exceeded 1.5 million by January 2002.

Beginning in August 1999, M2M toured and performed extensively to promote their debut single "Don't Say You Love Me", performing several concerts in the US and throughout Asia, as well as appearing on an episode of the show One World, and performing at Walt Disney World in February 2000. M2M continued to keep a high profile following the release of Shades of Purple, appearing on Top of the Pops in March 2000 embarking on a tour of US high schools and touring with Hanson in September.

=== Singles ===
"Don't Say You Love Me" was released in October 1999 as the lead song from the Pokémon: The First Movie soundtrack. There was a minor lyric change between the versions, as the original version contained the lyrics "then you start kissing me", which was deemed inappropriate for Pokémon's young viewers and was changed to "then you said you love me". The original version was retained on Shades of Purple. Promoted by a "nonstop marketing effort", advanced airing on Radio Disney and the affiliation with Pokémon, the single was successful. It charted at No. 2 in Norway, No. 4 in both Australia and New Zealand, No. 16 in the UK and No. 21 on the Billboard Hot 100. It was certified gold in both Australia and the US, and was nominated for Song of the Year at the 2000 Spellemannprisen awards.

The second single from the album was '"Mirror Mirror", which reached No. 30 in Australia, No. 13 in Canada and No. 62 on the Billboard Hot 100. It was certified gold in the US. The album's final single was "Everything You Do", which reached No. 21 on the US Hot Dance Singles Sales. Additionally a music video, directed by Tryan George, was filmed in Norway for the song "The Day You Went Away", which was released as a promotion single in Mexico. All of the singles on the album appeared on M2M's 2003 best-of album The Day You Went Away: The Best of M2M.

== Critical reception ==
Professional ratings
Review scores
| Source | Rating |
|---|---|
| AllMusic | 3.5/5 stars |
| Entertainment Weekly | B |
| Rolling Stone | 3.5/5 stars |
| The Village Voice | A− |
| Edmonton Journal | 3.5/5 stars |

The album received positive reviews. The Village Voice's Robert Christgau stated that "even when the writing is ordinary, the quality teenpop, some assembly-line and some personalized, is transfigured by the duo's singing." Entertainment Weekly critic Arion Berger wrote that M2M's "precise Euro-dance pop is fun, fun, fun, and behind the lip gloss is enough insecurity to charm." Heather Phares from AllMusic said "Overall, Shades of Purple is a strong debut from a young group that still sounds fresh and innocent ... something of a rarity in teen pop." Michael Paoletta from Billboard gave a favourable review, saying "The 13 tracks on display here showcase a seasoned singing style that is, quite frankly, the antithesis of teen sensations like Britney Spears", concluding "Beautifully sun-kissed, Shades of Purple is poised to be the soundtrack of spring/summer 2000."

According to Sandra Sperounes of the Edmonton Journal, although Marion Raven and Marit Larsen "write their own pop songs, play their own instruments", the duo "sound like Mickey Mouse on helium", making Shades of Purple "a chore to listen to … for any extended length of time", despite containing "a few gems, particularly 'Everything You Do'".

The album was nominated for the Best Pop Album at the 2000 Spellemannprisen awards.

== Track listing ==
| No. | Title | Writer(s) | Producer(s) | Length |
|---|---|---|---|---|
| 1. | "Don't Say You Love Me" | Marit Larsen; Marion Raven; Jimmy Bralower; Peter Zizzo | Bralower; Zizzo | 3:46 |
| 2. | "The Day You Went Away" | Larsen; Raven; Matt Rowe | Bralower (exec.); Rowe | 3:43 |
| 3. | "Girl in Your Dreams" | Raven | Rowe | 3:31 |
| 4. | "Mirror Mirror" | Dave Deviller; Sean Hosein; Pamela Sheyne | Deviller; Hosein | 3:21 |
| 5. | "Pretty Boy" | Bottolf Lødemel; Nora Skaug | David Kreuger; Per Magnusson; Max Martin (exec.) | 4:40 |
| 6. | "Give a Little Love" | Larsen; Raven; Matt Rowe | Bralower (exec.); Rowe | 3:59 |
| 7. | "Everything You Do" | Larsen; Raven; Lars Aass | Bralower; Kenneth Lewis | 4:02 |
| 8. | "Don't Mess with My Love" | Larsen; Raven; Guy Roche; Shelly Peiken | Bralower | 3:44 |
| 9. | "Dear Diary" | Larsen; Raven; Sheyne; Greg Wells | Bralower | 3:58 |
| 10. | "Do You Know What You Want" | Larsen; Raven; Full Force | Full Force | 4:06 |
| 11. | "Smiling Face" | Larsen; Raven; Matt Rowe | Rowe | 4:15 |
| 12. | "Our Song" | Larsen; Raven; Robert Jazayeri; Sean Mather; Barry Gibb; Maurice Gibb; Robin Gibb | Jazayeri, Mather | 3:54 |
| 13. | "Why" | Larsen; Raven; Carole Bayer Sager | Bralower | 4:20 |
| Total length: | | | | 51:07 |

Australia limited and Japanese edition
| No. | Title | Writer(s) | Producer(s) | Length |
|---|---|---|---|---|
| 14. | "The Feeling Is Gone" | Larsen; Raven; Rowe | Rowe | 3:14 |
| Total length: | | | | 54:21 |

Australia limited edition bonus disc
| No. | Title | Writer(s) | Length |
|---|---|---|---|
| 15. | "Don't Say You Love Me" (Live Acoustic) | Larsen; Raven; Bralower; Zizzo | 3:50 |
| 16. | "Pretty Boy" (Live Acoustic) | Lødemel; Skaug | 4:18 |
| 17. | "Girl in Your Dreams" (Live Acoustic) | Raven | 3:54 |
| 18. | "Don't Say You Love Me" (music video) | Larsen; Raven; Bralower; Zizzo | 3:38 |
| 19. | "Mirror Mirror" (music video) | Deviller; Hosein; Sheyne | 3:15 |
| Total length: | | | 70:02 |

Taiwan edition
| No. | Title | Writer(s) | Length |
|---|---|---|---|
| 14. | "Pretty Boy" (Mandarin Version) | Lødemel; Skaug | 4:39 |
| 15. | "Don't Say You Love Me" (Acoustic Version) | Larsen; Raven; Bralower; Zizzo | 3:24 |
| 16. | "Mirror Mirror" (Acoustic Version) | Deviller; Hosein; Sheyne | 3:17 |
| 17. | "Pretty Boy" (Acoustic Version) | Lødemel; Skaug | 4:11 |
| Total length: | | | 66:38 |

Taiwan interview edition
| No. | Title | Writer(s) | Length |
|---|---|---|---|
| 18. | "Everything You Do" (Groove Brothers Remix Radio Edit) | Larsen; Raven; Lars Aass | 3:46 |
| 19. | "Everything You Do" (Jonathan Peters Radio Mix) | Larsen; Raven; Lars Aass | 3:38 |
| 20. | "Exclusive Interview & Sneak Preview with M2M!!" | | 7:38 |
| 21. | "The Day You Went Away" (music video) | Larsen; Raven; Rowe | 3:37 |
| Total length: | | | 85:17 |

== Credits and personnel ==
Credits are taken from AllMusic. Writers and producers are mentioned in track listing.

M2M
- Marit Larsen – vocals
- Marion Raven – vocals
Additional musicians
- Jimmy Bralower – drums
- Kent Wood – keyboards
- Dave Deviller – guitar
- Johnny Gale – electric guitar
- Steve Lewinson – bass
- Ken Lewis – electric guitar
- Per Magnusson – keyboards
- Milton McDonald – guitar
- Esbjörn Öhrwall – guitar
- Matt Rowe – keyboards
- Marc Shulman – electric guitar
- Steve Sidelnyk – percussion
- John Thernis – guitar
- Tom Wolk – bass, buitar, keyboards, slide guitar
- Kent Wood – keyboards
- Peter Zizzo – bass, acoustic guitar, electric guitar, keyboards
Production
- Steve Boyer – engineer, vocal recording
- Jimmy Bralower – arranger, drum programming, engineer
- Robert Jazayeri – composer
- Michael Brauer – mixing
- Greg Calbi – mastering
- Jake Davies – engineer
- Dave Deviller – programming, vocal producer
- Sean Hosein – programming, vocal producer
- Ted Jensen – mastering
- David Krueger – arranger, engineer, programming
- Ken Lewis – engineer
- Bernard Löhr – mixing
- Tom Lord-Alge – mixing
- Per Magnusson – arranger, programming
- Kaj Robole – engineer
- Matt Rowe – programming
- Mark Rubenstein – engineer
- Ken Schubert – engineer
- John Siket – engineer
- Peter Zizzo – arranger
Artwork and management
- Richard Bates – art direction, design
- Andrea Brooks – art direction, design

== Charts ==
=== Weekly charts ===
| Chart (2000) | Peak position |
|---|---|
| Australian Albums (ARIA) | 63 |
| Japanese Albums (Oricon) | 97 |
| Norwegian Albums (VG-lista) | 7 |
| US Billboard 200 | 89 |
| US Top Heatseekers | 1 |

=== Year-end charts ===
| Chart (2000) | Position |
|---|---|
| Singaporean English Albums (SPVA) | 6 |

== Certifications and sales ==
Certifications for Shades of Purple
| Region | Certification | Certified units/sales |
|---|---|---|
| Malaysia (RIM) | Gold | 100,000 |
| Norway (IFPI Norway) | 4× Platinum | 95,000 |
| South Korea (RIAK) | — | 33,973 |
