= Pokémon: The First Movie =

1998 Japanese anime film directed by Kunihiko Yuyama

- Theatrical release poster

Japanese name
- Kanji: 劇場版ポケットモンスター ミュウツーの逆襲
- Literal meaning: Pocket Monsters the Movie: Mewtwo Strikes Back
Transcriptions
- Revised Hepburn: Gekijō-ban Pokettomonsutā Myūtsū no Gyakushū
- Directed by: Kunihiko Yuyama
- Screenplay by: Takeshi Shudo
- Based on: Pokémon: Indigo League by Satoshi Tajiri, & Nintendo
- Produced by: Choji Yoshikawa; Tomoyuki Igarashi; Takemoto Mori
- Starring: Rica Matsumoto; Ikue Ōtani; Mayumi Iizuka; Yūji Ueda; Megumi Hayashibara; Shin-ichiro Miki; Inuko Inuyama; Unshō Ishizuka; Kōichi Yamadera; Raymond Johnson; Sachiko Kobayashi; Aiko Satō; Masachika Ichimura
- Cinematography: Hisao Shirai
- Edited by: Toshio Henmi; Yutaka Itō
- Music by: Shinji Miyazaki; John Loeffler (English Version); Ralph Schuckett (English Version); Manny Corallo (English Version); Deniz Hughes (English Version); John Lissauer (English Version); Kenneth Lampl (English Version)
- Production company: OLM, Inc.
- Distributed by: Toho
- Release date: July 18, 1998 (Japan)
- Running time: 75 minutes
- Country: Japan
- Language: Japanese
- Budget: $5 million
- Box office: $172.7 million

Pokémon: The First Movie (Note: Known in Japan as Pocket Monsters the Movie: Mewtwo Strikes Back (Japanese: 劇場版ポケットモンスター ミュウツーの逆襲, Hepburn: Gekijō-ban Pokettomonsutā Myūtsū no Gyakushū)) is a 1998 Japanese animated fantasy adventure film directed by Kunihiko Yuyama. It is the first in the Pokémon anime film series. The film was first released in Japan on July 18, 1998, to positive reviews, with praise directed at the film's emotional impact and exploration of ethical topics such as cloning, genetic modification, and existentialism.

The English-language adaptation was released in North America and other countries on November 12, 1999, by Warner Bros. Pictures. This version was received far less positively than the original Japanese release, with much criticism pointed at the inclusion of an anti-violence message contradictory to the series' overall concept. Further, retrospective criticism of the dub has been targeted against the removal of most of the ethical topics from the original Japanese version, such as part of Mewtwo's origin story. Despite mixed reviews, it was a box office success worldwide, topping the box office charts in its opening weekend and eventually grossing over $172 million at the worldwide box office. It also sold 10 million home video units in the United States, including 4.2 million VHS sales that earned $58.8 million in 2000.

On July 8, 1999, an extended version (Note: Japanese: 完全版, Hepburn: kanzenban) aired on Japanese television. In addition to an added prologue, the release included new animation and CGI graphics. The film primarily consists of two segments: The Uncut Story of Mewtwo's Origin, the ten-minute prologue added to the extended version; and Mewtwo Strikes Back, the main 75-minute film feature. Overseas, the prologue can only be seen as a bonus short in DVD versions of Pokémon: Mewtwo Returns. Several versions of the film, such as the theatrical release, also include Pikachu's Summer Vacation, a bonus side story featuring Pikachu as the protagonist.

A full CGI remake of the movie, titled Pokémon: Mewtwo Strikes Back – Evolution, was released in 2019.

== Plot ==
Giovanni, leader of Team Rocket, recruits scientist Dr. Fuji to create a cloned supersoldier from an eyelash of the Mythical Pokémon Mew, with Fuji intending to use the research to clone his deceased daughter, Amber. In a laboratory, the weapon eventually gains sentience and is named Mewtwo. Mewtwo befriends the salvaged consciousness of Amber, named Ambertwo, as well as the clones of other Pokémon in the laboratory. However, Mewtwo becomes traumatized after Ambertwo and the rest of the clones decompose and die. To stabilize him, Fuji tranquilizes Mewtwo, causing him to fall into suspended animation.

After Mewtwo fully matures and awakens from his long slumber in the laboratory on New Island, he learns of his origins. Infuriated that Fuji and his colleagues see him as a mere experiment, he uses his psychic abilities to telekinetically destroy the laboratory and kill Fuji and the scientists. Giovanni, witnessing the carnage from afar, offers Mewtwo his help to develop and perfect his mental abilities. However, after Mewtwo realizes his purpose as a weapon for Giovanni's benefit, he destroys Team Rocket's headquarters and returns to New Island, plotting to exact revenge against humanity and Pokémon alike.

After rebuilding the laboratory and establishing a base there, Mewtwo sends invites to several trainers through hologram messages to battle the greatest Pokémon Master in the world on New Island. Ash Ketchum, Misty, and Brock receive a message and accept the invitation, but by the time they arrive at the port city, Old Shore Wharf, Mewtwo has created a storm, causing the boats to be closed off for safety. To make it over there, Ash's group is picked up by Team Rocket, disguised as Vikings, on a boat. After the storm sinks their vessel in the middle of the ocean, Ash and his friends use their Pokémon to reach New Island.

Escorted into the island's palace by the woman who appeared on the hologram, Ash and the other trainers who reached the island encounter Mewtwo. The woman is revealed to be a brainwashed Nurse Joy after she is released from Mewtwo's mind control. Mewtwo challenges the trainers using cloned Pokémon. Team Rocket, having also reached New Island, explore its inner sanctum, with Mew innocuously following them. After Mewtwo's clones effortlessly defeat the challengers' Pokémon, he confiscates them and expands his clone army. Ash chases after his captured Pikachu to the cloning lab, where Team Rocket's Meowth is also cloned. Ash destroys the cloning machine, frees the captured Pokémon, and leads them to confront Mewtwo and his clones. Mew then reveals itself, and Mewtwo challenges it to prove his superiority.

All the Pokémon originals battle their clones, save for a defiant Pikachu and Meowth, the latter reconciling with his clone after realizing the senselessness of their fighting. Ash, horrified at the pain and anguish felt on both sides of the battle, puts himself in between a psychic blast caused by Mewtwo and Mew's fighting, which petrifies him. Pikachu tries reviving Ash with his electricity but fails, and he and the other Pokémon, original and clone alike, are reduced to tears. However, Ash is revived by these tears, and Mewtwo is moved by the boy's sacrifice, realizing that he and others should not have to be judged by their origins, but rather by their choices in life. Departing with Mew and the clones, Mewtwo turns back time to just before the trainers leave Old Shore Wharf and erases everyone's memories of the events.

Back in Old Shore Wharf, the now-restored Nurse Joy reopens the Pokémon Center to shelter the trainers. As the storm outside clears up, Ash spots Mew flying through the clouds and tells his friends how he saw another legendary Pokémon the day he left Pallet Town for his journey. Meanwhile, Team Rocket find themselves stranded on a revitalized New Island, unable to remember how they got there, but enjoy their time nonetheless.

== Cast ==
Main cast
| Character | | Japanese voice actor | English voice actor |
| English name | Japanese name | Japanese voice actor | English voice actor |
|---|---|---|---|
| Ash Ketchum | Satoshi | Rica Matsumoto | Veronica Taylor |
| Pikachu | | Ikue Ōtani | Ikue Ōtani |
| Misty | Kasumi | Mayumi Iizuka | Rachael Lillis |
| Brock | Takeshi | Yūji Ueda | Eric Stuart |
| Togepi | | Satomi Kōrogi | Satomi Kōrogi |
| Jessie | Musashi | Megumi Hayashibara | Rachael Lillis |
| James | Kojirō | Shin'ichirō Miki | Eric Stuart |
| Meowth | Nyarth | Inuko Inuyama | Maddie Blaustein |
| Fergus | Umio (ウミオ) | Wataru Takagi | Jimmy Zoppi |
| Corey | Sorao (ソラオ) | Tōru Furuya | Ed Paul |
| Neesha | Sweet (スイート, Suīto) | Aiko Satō | Amy Birnbaum |
| Miranda | Voyager (ボイジャー, Boijā) | Sachiko Kobayashi | Lisa Ortiz |
| Pirate | Raymond (レイモンド, Reimondo) | Raymond Johnson | Maddie Blaustein |
| Mewtwo | | Masachika Ichimura Fujiko Takimoto (young; radio drama) Showtaro Morikubo (young; anime) | Jay Goede |
| Mew | | Koichi Yamadera | Koichi Yamadera |
| Giovanni | Sakaki | Hirotaka Suzuoki | Ed Paul |
| Officer Jenny | Junsar | Chinami Nishimura | Lee Quick |
| Nurse Joy | Joy | Ayako Shiraishi | Megan Hollingshead |
| Dr. Fuji (フジ博士) | | Yōsuke Akimoto | Philip Bartlett |
| Narrator | | Unshō Ishizuka | Ken Gates |

Characters exclusive to Pikachu's Vacation
| Character | | Japanese voice actor | English voice actor |
| English name | Japanese name | Japanese voice actor | English voice actor |
|---|---|---|---|
| Raichu | | Urara Takano | Urara Takano |
| Snubbull | Buru | Naoki Tatsuta | Jimmy Zoppi |
| Marill | | Mika Kanai | Kayzie Rogers |
| Cubone | Karakara | Chiyako Shibahara | Michael J. Haigney |
| Commentary | | Aiko Satō | —N/a |
| Pokédex ("Dexter") | Pokémon Encyclopedia | —N/a | Eric Stuart |

Characters that appear in the radio drama and The Uncut Story of Mewtwo's Origin
| Character | | Japanese voice actor | English voice actor |
| English name | Japanese name | Japanese voice actor | English voice actor |
|---|---|---|---|
| Ambertwo | Aitwo (アイツー, Aitsū) | Kyōko Hikami | Unknown |
| Bulbasaurtwo | Fushigidanetwo (フシギダネツー, Fushigidanetsū) | Etsuko Kozakura | Tara Jayne |
| Charmandertwo | Hitokagetwo (ヒトカゲツー, Hitokagetsū) | Yūji Ueda | Michael J. Haigney |
| Squirtletwo | Zenigametwo (ゼニガメツー, Zenigametsū) | Satomi Kōrogi | Eric Stuart |
| Doctor Fuji's wife | | Shinobu Adachi | Unknown |
| Madame Boss (女ボス, On'na Bosu) | | Hiromi Tsuru | —N/a (Note: These characters do not appear in the animated version.) |
| Miyamoto (ミヤモト) | | Yumi Tōma | —N/a |
| Announcers | | Kentarō Itō Katsuyuki Konishi Saori Higashi | —N/a |
| Investigator | | Shinpachi Tsuji | —N/a |
| Researchers | | Katsuyuki Konishi Takuma Suzuki | —N/a |
| Trainer | | Saori Higashi | —N/a |

== Production ==
Kunihiko Yuyama directed the original Japanese version of the film, while Choji Yoshikawa and Takeshi Shudo served as producer and scriptwriter, respectively. Unlike subsequent Pokémon films, this film was not produced by the Pikachu Project. According to Shudo, certain episodes in the anime were intended to tie-in with the movie prior to its release in Japan, and provide background information behind the events of the film. However, the controversy surrounding the "Dennō Senshi Porygon" episode on December 16, 1997, delayed the tie-in episodes, causing Shudo to expand the beginning and overall length of the film.

=== Themes ===
Shudo explained in his blog that Mewtwo being torn over his life purpose reflects the film's theme of existentialism. In the Japanese script, for instance, the moment Mewtwo realizes he has a right to be in the world just as much as any other living creature represents the central message of accepting one's existence. Amber, who is named Ai (アイ) in the Japanese script, was named so to highlight the film's overall message of self-existence, with Ai being a homonym of the English word "I".

=== English-language adaptation ===
Norman J. Grossfeld, former president of 4Kids Productions, served as the film's producer for the English-language North American version. Grossfeld, Michael Haigney, and John Touhey wrote the English adaptation, and Haigney served as the English version's voice director. The English script was heavily edited from the original Japanese one; along with various content edits, Mewtwo is portrayed more maliciously because Grossfeld felt American audiences needed to see a "clearly evil" villain rather than a morally ambiguous one. As such, the existential themes seen in the Japanese version were significantly toned-down. These changes were not well received by the original Japanese production crew, with executive producer Masakazu Kubo describing Warner Bros.' proposed changes "a hassle".

The English version editors translated various Japanese texts, including those on signs and buildings, into English. The Shogakukan-Shueisha Productions (formerly Shogakukan Productions) also altered various background from the original version of the film in order to enhance its presentation overseas. In the English dub, three Pokémon are referred to by the wrong name. Pidgeot is called "Pidgeotto", Scyther is called "Alakazam", and Sandslash is called "Sandshrew". 4Kids said that they decided to leave the latter two errors when they noticed it as something for the children watching to notice and because they felt it was plausible in context that Team Rocket could make a mistake.

Grossfeld had new music re-recorded for the film's release, citing that it "would better reflect what American kids would respond to." John Loeffler of Rave Music produced the English-language music and co-composed the film score with Ralph Schuckett. Loeffler collaborated with John Lissauer and Manny Corallo to produce the English-language "Pikachu's Vacation" score. Grossfeld revealed that the English version of the film "combines the visual sense of the best Japanese animation with the musical sensibility of Western pop culture." Grossfeld revealed in a 2022 interview that while shopping the film around to distributors, one studio suggested having Leonardo DiCaprio dub over Ash's lines, a decision Grossfeld found "weird". Ultimately, he managed to work out a deal with Warner Bros.

Warner reportedly paid less than $10 million for the rights to the film in the U.S. and foreign territories outside of Asia.

== Marketing ==
=== Burger King promotion ===
Burger King released a limited series of kids' meal toys to tie in with the film. Also promoted were six 23 karat gold Pokémon cards, each enclosed inside a large plastic Poké Ball. Every card is a 23 karat gold plated slab of metal inside a clear protective plastic case that came with a certificate of authenticity signed by Nintendo of America chairman Howard Lincoln. The first run of gold cards sent and released to Burger King locations were packaged in a limited blue box that sold out immediately. A large second print of gold cards was packaged in a red box until the film promotion ended.

==== Controversy ====
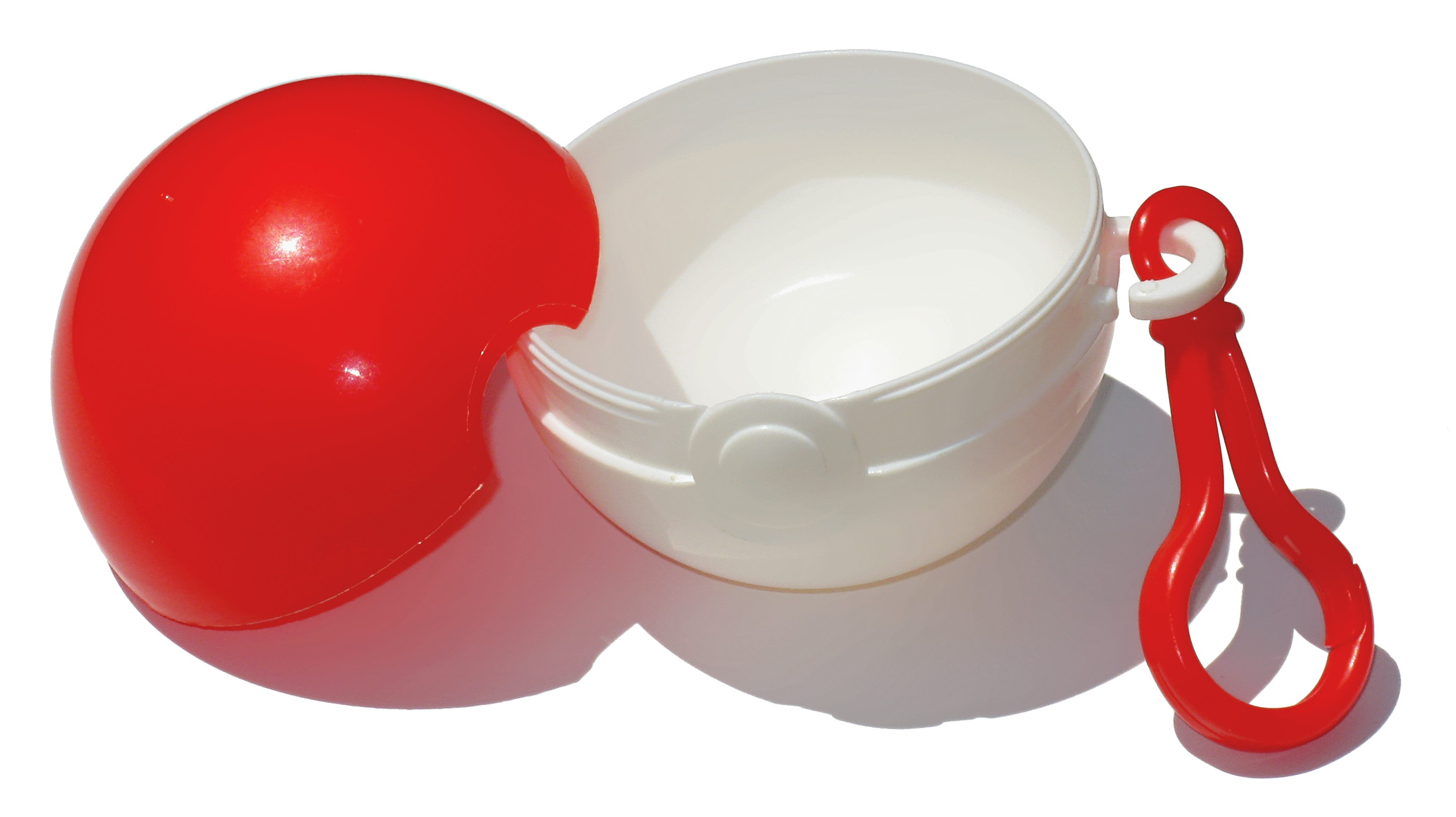
A Poké Ball container. These containers were determined to present a suffocation hazard and as such were recalled.

On December 11, 1999, 13-month-old Kira Murphy from California died when half of the Poké Ball toy became stuck over her mouth and nose, causing her to suffocate; she was later found deceased in her playpen. Twelve days later, a second child in Kansas survived a similar incident. On December 28, 1999, Burger King issued a recall of the toys. Adults were urged to discard or return both pieces of the toy. Customers returning the toy were given a small order of French fries in return. Nearly a month after the recall, another child suffocated from the toy. The dead children's families settled their lawsuits on undisclosed terms.

=== Manga ===
Toshihiro Ono, author of Pokémon: The Electric Tale of Pikachu, created a manga version of the film. Asked by editors to draw Mewtwo's birth, he received the source material to base the manga off in April 1998 and finished the manga in May. In July of that year, a five episode radio drama titled The Birth of Mewtwo was broadcast over the five Sundays leading up to the premiere of the movie in Japan. Written by Takeshi Shudo, the drama delves into Mewtwo's origin prior to the start of the film. It also explores the leadership of Team Rocket under Madame Boss, Giovanni's mother, and the last known whereabouts of Miyamoto (ミヤモト), Jessie's mother. Due to its mature themes, it was never dubbed in English. The drama eventually served the basis for the Origin of Mewtwo prologue that would appear in the extended version of the film. Since the drama was conceived a few months after the manga, the events depicted in the drama do not match up with the events portrayed in the manga. Ono has even stated that "there's not much connection between the manga and the movie."

=== Soundtrack ===
Pokémon: The First Movie – Music from and Inspired by the Motion Picture is the soundtrack to the first Pokémon film in the United States. It was released by Atlantic Records on November 9, 1999, on compact disc and cassette tape. The Pokémon: The First Movie album was certified double platinum by the Recording Industry Association of America (RIAA) on January 11, 2000, for selling 2,000,000 copies. "Don't Say You Love Me" by M2M was released as a single from the album, taken off of their debut studio album, Shades of Purple, released on March 7, 2000. For the opening, a remake of the original English theme song from Pokémon: Indigo League originally composed by John Loeffler and John Siegler and originally performed on vocals by Jason Paige, titled "Pokémon Theme (Movie Version)", is performed by Filipino actor and singer Billy Crawford under a new arrangement of the theme song. For the film's end credits, "We're a Miracle" by Christina Aguilera was used from her eponymous debut album. The soundtrack also features songs from popular artists at the time such as Britney Spears, 98°, *NSYNC, and B*Witched.

=== Trailers ===
In the United States, the first trailer was released in August 1999 and was shown before The Iron Giant and Mystery Men. The second trailer was released in late 1999 and was attached to The Bachelor. In addition, select theaters gave away exclusive Pokémon trading cards to capitalize on the success of the trading card game. The cards feature likenesses of Electabuzz, Pikachu, Mewtwo, and Dragonite and were dispensed in random order for each week it was in that particular theater. The subsequent releases of Pokémon: The Movie 2000 and Pokémon 3: The Movie featured a similar marketing campaign. The March 2000 home video release of The First Movie had TV, in-school, and online ads with companies such as Clorox, Kraft, and Zenith Electronics, a contest to win a trip to Japan, and a limited edition Mewtwo card (different from that used for the theatrical release) that was packaged with the video.

== Release ==
The Japanese version of the film was initially distributed theatrically by Toho on July 18, 1998.

On March 9, 1999, Warner Bros. Pictures negotiated a deal with 4Kids Entertainment and The Summit Media Group to acquire worldwide distribution rights to the film outside Asia. The deal was verified on June 24, with an announcement that the film would be released on November 12 in the United States. Prior to that date, the film premiered on November 6 at Grauman's Chinese Theatre in Hollywood.

In 2016, the film was theatrically re-released exclusively at Cinemark theaters in the United States on October 29 and November 1, 2016. The re-release included the Pikachu's Vacation short film from the original release and was intended to commemorate Pokémon's 20th anniversary.

=== Broadcast airing ===
For TV syndication, the movie was digitally remastered for high definition and aired in TV Tokyo, as well as in other stations, beginning May 3, 2013. The remastered version also aired in the United States on Cartoon Network on January 4, 2014.

=== Home media ===
The film was released on March 21, 2000, in Region 1 format (United States and Canada) on both VHS and DVD by Warner Home Video. The original DVD release with the snap case contains numerous features that were removed from later reprints, such as the origin prologue and the Pikachu's Vacation short film. Other options, such as Dolby Digital 5.1 sound, have been removed, leaving only the 2.0 stereo mix available, among other features.

The original VHS release sold 4.2 million units and earned $58.8 million in the United States by the end of 2000. By 2007, the film had sold 10 million units on home video in the United States.

The film was included in the Blu-ray compilation titled Pikachu the Movie Premium Box 1998–2010 in Japan on November 28, 2012.

On February 9, 2016, Viz Media and Warner Home Video released a limited edition Blu-ray SteelBook containing the Pokémon films Pokémon: The First Movie, Pokémon the Movie 2000, and Pokémon 3: The Movie, along with single releases on DVD. In accommodation with the 20th anniversary of the Pokémon franchise, a digitally remastered version of the film was released on digital stores on February 27. On October 2, 2018, the three-film Blu-ray set was re-released as a standard single-disc edition.

== Reception ==
=== Critical response ===
Reviews of the original Japanese version have generally been positive due to the film's emotional impact and exploration of ethical topics such as cloning and genetic engineering. However, the philosophical themes were criticized for being too complex for children.

While the English dub of the film received decent reviews from audiences, it received generally negative reviews from critics. On review aggregator Rotten Tomatoes, 16% of critics have given the film's English adaptation a positive review based on 91 reviews, with an average rating of 3.57/10. The website's critics' consensus reads, "Audiences other than children will find very little to entertain them." On Metacritic, the film has a weighted average score of 35 out of 100 based on 25 critics, indicating "generally unfavorable reviews". Audiences polled by CinemaScore gave the film an average grade of "A−" on an A+ to F scale.

Anime News Network review called the main feature "contradictory", stating that "the anti-violent message that is pretty much crammed down our throats works directly against the entire point of the franchise" and criticized Pikachu's Summer Vacation for being "incoherent, pointless and fluffy". Rating the movie two stars out of four, Roger Ebert of the Chicago Sun-Times called the movie "a sound-and-light show, linked to the marketing push for Pokémon in general" and said that the movie had "no level at which it enriches a young viewer, by encouraging thinking or observation." Michael Wood of the Coventry Evening Telegraph said that Pikachu's Summer Vacation "can only be described as a mind-numbingly tedious piece, with no discernible storyline and lots of trippy images and silly voices". Wood did note that the main feature had a "mildly intriguing premise" but said that the rest of the film "was like a martial arts movie without the thrills."

Retrospective reviews written several years after the release of the film have criticized the narrative changes made during the localization process, such as the omission of the extended-prologue detailing Mewtwo's origin and script changes that paint Mewtwo as an "oversimplified villain". Commenting on the English-language script of the film, Ryan Lambie of Den of Geek described the decision to cut Mewtwo's origin "a highly unfortunate move" and that the original Japanese script allowed for "a far more engrossing watch" due to its deeper exploration of mature, existential themes. Lambie also commented, however, that "the various edits made to its dialogue and story probably didn't mean much" to younger fans at the time of the movie's release, since the film was ultimately marketed towards children.

Common Sense Media gave the film one star out of five, saying "cooperation message buried under lots of violence".

Anita Gates of The New York Times, found the film visually energetic but largely unconvincing, arguing that it failed to bridge the generational gap, offered contradictory moral lessons, and remained appealing mainly to children rather than adults.

=== Box office ===
In Japan, it was the second-highest-grossing domestic film of 1998, earning a distribution income of ¥4.15 billion, and grossing a total of ¥7.6 billion.

In the U.S. box office, Pokémon: The First Movie was an instant commercial success, debuting at number one and earning $10.1 million on its Wednesday opening day. This day is commonly called the "Pokéflu" because so many children missed school to see the film, much to the chagrin of educators. This was the biggest animated film opening for any film in the history of Warner Bros. The film remained the only anime film to top the U.S. box office until 2021's Demon Slayer: Kimetsu no Yaiba – The Movie: Mugen Train. During its first weekend, it grossed $31 million and went on to generate a total of $50.8 million since its Wednesday launch in 3,043 theaters, averaging to about $10,199 per venue over the three-day span. It also held the records for being the animated feature with the highest opening weekend in November outside of the Thanksgiving holiday and for a non-Disney animated film, both of which were previously held by The Rugrats Movie in 1998. Despite a 59.72% drop in its second weekend to $12.5 million and dropped to third place behind Sleepy Hollow and The World Is Not Enough the film made $67.4 million within 12 days. It remained in third place during its third weekend, Thanksgiving weekend, behind The World Is Not Enough and Toy Story 2. It closed on February 27, 2000, earning $85.7 million in North America and $77.9 million in other territories. It is the highest-grossing anime film in the United States and the fourth highest-grossing animated film based on a television show worldwide. It was also the highest-grossing film based on a video game at the time, until 2001's Lara Croft: Tomb Raider. Commercially, Takeshi Shudo states the film fared better overall in the U.S. than it did in its home country. As of September 2025, the film's United States box office total is estimated to have been $190.7 million when adjusted for inflation.

In the United Kingdom, the film grossed £10.8 million at the box office. It is also the highest-grossing Japanese film in France and Germany, where it sold 2,224,432 and 3,222,452 box office admissions, respectively. In total, the film's worldwide box office gross was $172,744,662 (¥19 billion).

=== Accolades ===
At the Stinkers Bad Movie Awards, the film garnered five nominations, of which it won two: Worst Achievement in Animation (OLM, K.K.) and Most Unwelcome Direct-to-Video Release (All nine Pokémon videos released in 1999). However, it lost Biggest Disappointment (Films That Didn't Live Up to Their Hype) to The Blair Witch Project, Worst Screen Debut (all 151 Pokémon) to Jar Jar Binks (played by Ahmed Best) in Star Wars: Episode I – The Phantom Menace, and Worst Screenplay for a Film Grossing More than $100 Million Using Hollywood Math (Takeshi Shudo) to Wild Wild West.

| Award | Subject | Nominee | Result |
|---|---|---|---|
| Animation Kobe | Theatrical Film Award | OLM, K.K. | Won |
| Stinkers Award | Worst Achievement in Animation | OLM, K.K. | Won |
| Stinkers Award | Most Unwelcome Direct-to-Video Release | All nine Pokémon videos were released in 1999 | Won |
| Stinkers Award | Biggest Disappointment (Films That Didn't Live Up to Their Hype) | Toho/Warner Bros. | Nominated |
| Stinkers Award | Worst Screen Debut | Pokémon (All 151 of Them!) | Nominated |
| Stinkers Award | Worst Screenplay for a Film Grossing More than $100 Million Using Hollywood Math | Takeshi Shudo | Nominated |

== Legacy ==
The film serves as the primary influence on Mewtwo's portrayal in the Super Smash Bros. series of fighting games, in keeping with the anime inspiration for playable Pokémon characters. Mewtwo's playable debut in Super Smash Bros. Melee features Masachika Ichimura reprising his role as Mewtwo from the film, and the Japanese version of the game contains quotes reminiscent of Mewtwo's character in the film. The character's return as a DLC fighter in Super Smash Bros. for Nintendo 3DS and Wii U was heralded by the tagline "Mewtwo Strikes Back!" in a gameplay trailer. Instead of Ichimura, Mewtwo is voiced by Keiji Fujiwara in Super Smash Bros. for Nintendo 3DS and Wii U and Super Smash Bros. Ultimate. Elements and references from the second Mewtwo in Pokémon the Movie: Genesect and the Legend Awakened are included in later games such as its Mega Evolution, Final Smash, and Boxing Ring title.

During the end credits of Pokémon the Movie: The Power of Us (2018), it was announced that a CGI remake was set to release in the following year. In December 2018, the release date of the remake was revealed as July 12, 2019. Pokémon fansite Serebii reported that the film, titled Pokémon: Mewtwo Strikes Back – Evolution, would be directed by Kunihiko Yuyama and Motonori Sakakibara.

On January 22, 2020, it was announced that Netflix would be releasing the English-dubbed version of the film on February 27, 2020.

== See also ==
- Existentialism in film and television
- List of films based on video games
- Message picture
