= Burger King Pokémon container recall =

1999–2000 toy recall effort

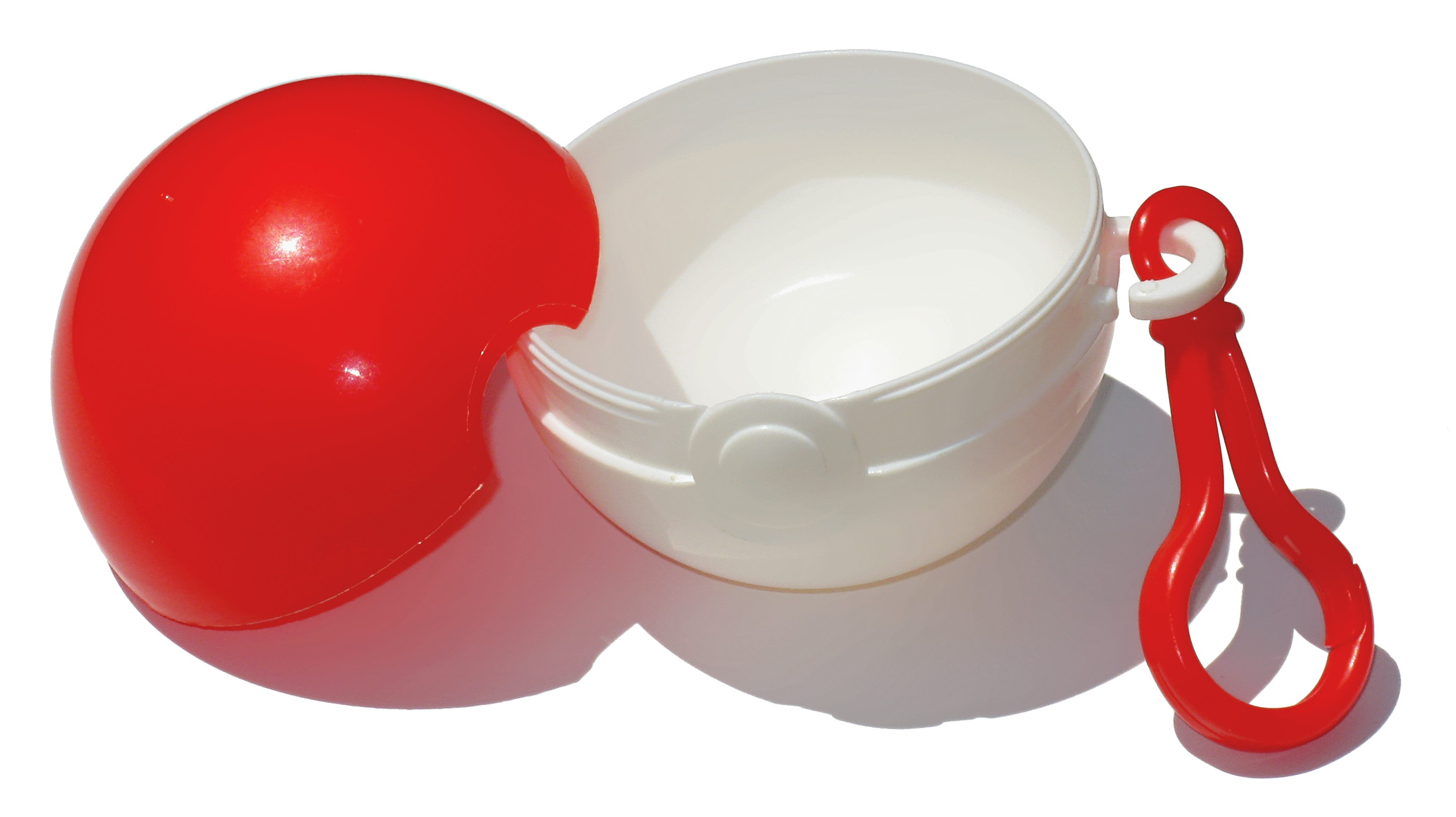
A Poké Ball container. These containers were determined to present a suffocation hazard and as such were recalled.

As part of a promotion for Pokémon: The First Movie during 1999 and 2000, fast food retail chain Burger King held a promotion featuring various Pokémon-themed toys. The toys came packaged in containers based around Poké Balls. When pulled apart, the containers were of a size that would create a vacuum effect around the mouth and nose.

Following the death of an infant who suffocated, the Consumer Product Safety Commission (CPSC) made an effort to recall the containers. Although Burger King was initially hesitant, it initiated a heavy recall effort after another infant nearly suffocated. Thousands of notices were placed throughout the United States and in other avenues, such as internet forums and news networks. Despite these efforts, another child died due to suffocation.

The recall effort was considered successful, with the bulk of the containers either destroyed, thrown out, or returned. Some have panned Burger King's response to the issue with the containers, though both Burger King and the containers' producer, Equity Marketing, believed they handled the situation as best as they could have. The parents of the initial suffocation victim later sued Burger King for the incident, with Burger King paying out a monetary settlement to the family.

== Background ==
Burger King released a set of 57 Pokémon toys in a two-month long promotion for Pokémon: The First Movie. These toys were contained within containers resembling Poké Balls, which measured from 2.75 to 3 inches (70 to 76 mm) in diameter. Burger King distributed the Poké Balls inside big kids meals and regular kids meals, with the promotion set to last for 56 days. The containers were made by Equity Marketing, Inc. in Los Angeles. The container could be opened by pulling the two halves of it apart. Ten days into the promotion, Burger King North America President, Paul Clayton, ran full-page newspaper ads apologizing for shortages, with the promotion selling over 1000 meals a day. The promotion was among the largest in fast food history.

== Suffocation risk and recall ==
Though it passed the safety standards of the Consumer Product Safety Commission, and packaging on the balls stated that the balls were safe, the design and size of the container made it possible to cover the nose and the mouth, and owing to the plastic's pliability, a child may suck the air out, creating a vacuum effect and causing the ball to become stuck to the face. Russ Rader, spokesperson for the Consumer Product Safety Commission, stated the more the child breathes, the tighter the ball is held in place. He claimed the balls were a hidden danger and was something parents could not anticipate. The container did not display any warning of a choking hazard, stating it passed all choking tests and was appropriate for all ages. Burger King stated it passed all U.S. Consumer Product Safety Commission requirements and all international safety standards.

On December 11, 1999, a 13-month-old girl in Sonora, California was left alone in her playpen with the ball. One half of the ball attached to her face and formed an airtight seal, causing her to suffocate to death. Following her death, the Tuolumne County Sheriff's Department issued a warning about the containers. However, according to the Miami Herald, for more than two weeks, parents were largely unaware of the risk posed by the balls due to discussions between Burger King and the government. This was the first time a Burger King toy was blamed for a death.

News reached the CPSC on December 15 about the balls. They demanded that Burger King either recall the balls or suspend distribution of them while an investigation was held. Burger King did not initiate a recall according to their spokesperson Charles Nicolas because "it was not concluded the ball was the cause", and according to federal regulators, Burger King "dragged its feet" in regard to the recall. On December 23, an 18-month-old Kansas girl reportedly got half of the ball stuck on her nose and mouth, but her father managed to remove it before she was injured. This resulted in Burger King agreeing to a recall. The CPSC told them to wait five days—December 29—to announce the recall to allow for them to get its nationwide strategy in place. However, Burger King initiated an announcement on December 27, two days before the agreed date, as information about the recall began to leak publicly. Ann Brown, a member of the CPSC, believed it was a move by Burger King to try and fly the situation under the radar and avoid negative press.

The recall push was massive. Burger King issued a statement to parents that they should take the containers away from children aged younger than three, and should be thrown away or returned to Burger King, where they could be redeemed for a free small order of French fries. Children could keep the toy that came with the ball, and they were not part of the recall. According to Burger King spokesperson Charles Nicolas, more than 25 million containers were included in the recall. Brown did a segment as planned on NBC News's Today, though she criticized Burger King's slow movements and the hasty recall announcement. Despite this, some stores were still unaware of the recall even after it had been put into place. Thousands of notices were sent to Burger King locations, pediatricians' offices, and emergency rooms, an ad in USA Today was posted, and warnings were put out on sites frequently visited by Pokémon fans. Burger King put information out on commercial networks and also set up a phone number for the recall. Despite the recall efforts, a 4-month-old boy in Indianapolis, Indiana, died of suffocation on January 25, 2000, in his crib. Following this death, another round of recall advertising, including radio advertising, was pushed out. The total recall effort cost Burger King more than US$1 million.

Despite the campaign, less than half of the 25 million containers were returned. According to a Burger King spokesperson, Burger King had destroyed more than 22.5 million undistributed containers and more than 500,000 returned containers by December 2000. Nancy A. Nord, acting chairperson of the commission, stated while some balls came back, the CPSC assumed most people had thrown them away. Research was done on the recall, which showed that among customers who did not respond to a recall, 60% had thrown the containers away, which is considered an effective recall. Burger King chose to end distribution of the balls three days before the promotion's scheduled end.

== Reaction ==
Burger King has received criticism for what was described as a slow start on their part to recall the products. Toy-safety experts were concerned with Burger King's decision to continue to distribute the balls, even with safety advisories, believing it to be a negative message with potentially harmful impacts. Burger King's recall process raised questions about toy safety, whether or not injuries should pull toys off the market, and how fast both companies and governments should respond to reports of injury. Toy experts have stated that Burger King could not have known about the threat of the balls, as suffocation was not something included in the safety tests for the toys. The toy recall was the largest ever recall at the time, and among the most expensive as well.

The parents of the 13-month-old girl filed suit against Burger King. They won a monetary settlement from Burger King, with both agreeing to keep the dollar amount confidential.

=== Responses from Burger King and Equity ===
Equity Marketing Inc. commented following the incident that the containers met or exceeded strict federal safety guidelines and underwent rigorous safety testing by an independent, third-party laboratory during and after production. According to Burger King representative Kim Miller, the recall heightened Burger King's awareness of potential toy hazards and the need to act quickly with regards to potential threats with toys. Ellen Mogg, assistant manager of a Burger King restaurant, stated they had not received any complaints from parents about it being a hazard; she felt they had been prompt in recalling them. Though Brown stated that Burger King's recall efforts were "admirable", Burger King spokesman Charles Nicolas believed the recall efforts were "not enough".

The promotion ended up getting a large amount of negative press for Burger King, both for the suffocations and the toy shortages. The company's president, Paul Clayton, took out full-page ads in newspapers to send out apologies. Despite this, experts predicted that both Burger King and Equity were unlikely to suffer any far-reaching consequences as a result of the recall. Ria Carlson, a spokesperson for the company, stated that they would do things differently going forward to avoid a repeat of the incident. Following the recall, Burger King improved its testing procedures and hired a human-factors psychologist to evaluate toys and how children will use them. Though Burger King had subsequent recalls, none were as severe as the Pokémon promotion in terms of their negative impact. Burger King also implemented a program to create toys "more appropriate" for children under three, though one of these attempts, the Rattling, Paddling Riverboat, was recalled due to manufacturing issues causing a pin holding the boat's paddle to detach.
