= Everything (M2M song) =

2001 single by M2M

Single by M2M

from the album The Big Room
- Released: October 2001
- Genre: Pop rock
- Length: 4:22
- Label: Atlantic
- Songwriters: Marit Larsen; Marion Raven; Peter Zizzo; Jimmy Bralower
- Producers: Jimmy Bralower; Peter Zizzo

M2M singles chronology
"Everything You Do" (2000)	"Everything" (2001)	"What You Do About Me" (2002)

"Everything" is a song by Norwegian pop music duo M2M. It was the first single and the opening track from the duo's second album, The Big Room. The single was released worldwide between October 2001 and March 2002. It was well received critically, and reached No. 6 in Norway in addition to being a minor hit in Australia, Italy and New Zealand. A music video directed by Chris Applebaum was released for the single. M2M performed the song on the 100th episode of Dawson's Creek and live at the 2002 Spellemannprisen awards. The song earned M2M a nomination for "Best International Artist" at the 2001 Mnet Asian Music Awards.

== Composition ==
The song is aimed at Zac Hanson, whom M2M member Marion Raven dated briefly while M2M were on tour with him and his band Hanson in 2000. According to Raven, once the tour ended he never contacted her, effectively ending the relationship. Lyrically, the song speaks of a relationship "gone sour".

== Release and promotion ==
The single was released in Southeast Asia in early October 2001, the United States in January 2002, Australia on 11 February 2002, and Norway on 4 March 2002. In December 2001 they opened a concert in Kuala Lumpur with the song. On 1 March 2002 they performed the song at the Spellemannprisen awards in front of 7,000 people and over 700,000 viewers. By mid April 2002 the track had received moderate airplay on radio in the US, particularly on the East Coast. Atlantic Records, however, decided not to market the song until M2M made their appearance on the 100th episode of Dawson's Creek, "100 Light Years from Home", on 17 April, hoping this would draw extra attention to the band. This decision upset M2M, who had already arrived in the US in the beginning of March to promote the song over a three-week period, though due to Atlantic's decision they returned home to Lørenskog after only one week. M2M performed the song in the episode, after Pacey Witter flirted with Raven. After filming the duo performed the song at a beach party which was attended by the cast of the show. M2M were scheduled to recommence promoting the single and album in the US in May, before moving onto Mexico, Australia and Japan. They arrived in Australia in mid May 2002 to promote both "Everything" and the follow-up single, "What You Do About Me".

== Reception ==
The single reached No. 6 in Norway, No. 27 in Australia, No. 37 in Italy and No. 44 in New Zealand. The song earned M2M a nomination for "Best International Artist" at the 2001 Mnet Asian Music Awards.

Chuck Taylor from Billboard called it a "smart, driving song, drenched in glittering harmonies and indelible hooks." Verdens Gang spoke highly of the track. Karen Tye from the Herald Sun called it an "energetic, catchy single". Entertainment Weekly considered it to be one of the "best uptempo tracks" on The Big Room, saying it "recall[ed] the acoustic pop of Hanson (that's a compliment)." Girl.com.au said the track "sparkle[d] with irresistable [sic] melodies, smart and sassy lyrics and of course Marion and Marit's trademark harmony vocals." The Philippine Star said the track was one of the best songs on The Big Room, adding that it was a harder rock sound than usual for the duo.

== Music video ==
The video begins with Raven and Larsen singing the song while driving a convertible, before they perform on a red stage in the desert, along with a backup band. The music video was being played in Asia on MTV and Channel V by November 2001. By mid-April 2002 the music video was in rotation on MTV in Spain, Italy, Asia, Scandinavia, Brazil and Latin America. It was directed by Chris Applebaum and filmed in Los Angeles from 7 to 10 October 2001. Two versions were filmed: one with the album version radio edit and the other with the remix by Miklós Malek and Levy Thomas Egry.

== Charts ==
Chart (2001–2002)	Peak position
Australia (ARIA)	27
Italy (FIMI)	37
New Zealand (Recorded Music NZ)	44
Norway (VG-lista)	6
