= Mirror Mirror (M2M song) =

2000 single by M2M

Single by M2M

from the album Shades of Purple
- Released: 22 February 2000
- Genre: Pop
- Length: 3:19
- Label: Atlantic
- Songwriters: Dane DeViller; Pam Sheyne; Sean Hosein
- Producers: Dane Deviller; Sean Hosein

M2M singles chronology
"Don't Say You Love Me" (1999)	"Mirror Mirror" (2000)	"Everything You Do" (2000)

"Mirror Mirror" is a song recorded by Norwegian pop duo M2M, composed of singers Marion Raven and Marit Larsen. It was the second single from their debut album, Shades of Purple. The song reached No. 13 in Canada, No. 30 in Australia, and No. 62 on the US Billboard Hot 100. It was certified gold in the US, selling over 600,000 units.

Chuck Taylor gave the song a positive review, calling it "a true champion, oozing youthful pop charm with production that's compelling and sophisticated enough to appeal to people well into their 30s", also praising the inclusion of the "Power Dance Mix" of the song included on the single. The song is about sadness following a lost love, and a young girl's despair after "saying the wrong thing to the right guy".

M2M performed the song on episode six on the sixth season of All That, at a concert at Walt Disney World's Epcot park in February 2000, and on an episode of Nickelodeon's Snick House, which aired on 8 April 2000. MTV predicted that the Disney concert, which was recorded and appeared on an episode of Disney Channel in Concert on 29 April, would turn the song into a hit.

== Music video ==
The video shows footage of Marion and Marit singing separately both indoors and outdoors in the rain. This footage is mixed with romantic scenes between Marion and a young man, and footage of Marion playing piano and Marit playing guitar together, laying, and sleeping on a couch together, and looking in the Mirror. It was directed by Matthew Rolston. Hours of footage was shot outside, though only a few seconds of outdoor footage appeared in the finished video; the illusion of rain was created with a hose. MTV began airing the video in the US and Germany in early March 2000.

== Track listings ==
European CD single

1. "Mirror Mirror" (album version) – 3:19
2. "Mirror Mirror" (crossover edit) – 3:51
3. "Mirror Mirror" (Power Dance mix) – 3:51

German and Finnish CD single

1. "Mirror Mirror" (album version) – 3:19
2. "Mirror Mirror" (crossover edit) – 3:51

US and Canadian CD single

1. "Mirror Mirror" (album version) – 3:19
2. "Don't Say You Love Me" (acoustic version) – 3:14

US maxi-CD single

1. "Mirror Mirror" (album version) – 3:19
2. "Mirror Mirror" (crossover mix) – 3:50
3. "Mirror Mirror" (Power Dance mix) – 4:12
4. "Mirror Mirror" (extended Power Dance mix) – 5:55
5. "Don't Say You Love Me" (acoustic version) – 3:14

Australian maxi-CD single

1. "Mirror Mirror" (album version) – 3:19
2. "Don't Say You Love Me" (Tin Tin Out remix) – 3:32
3. "Mirror Mirror" (crossover mix—short version) – 3:51

== Charts ==
=== Weekly charts ===
Weekly chart performance for "Mirror Mirror"
Chart (2000)	Peak position
Australia (ARIA)	30
Canada (Nielsen SoundScan)	13
Canada Adult Contemporary (RPM)	61
US Billboard Hot 100	62
US Maxi-Singles Sales (Billboard)	18

=== Decade-end charts ===
Decade-end chart performance for "Mirror Mirror"
Chart (2000–2009)	Position
US Hot Singles Sales (Billboard)	24

== Certifications ==
Certifications for "Mirror Mirror"
Region	Certification	Certified units/sales
United States (RIAA)	Gold	600,000

== Release history ==
Release dates and formats for "Mirror Mirror"
Region	Date	Format(s)	Label(s)	Ref.
United States	22 February 2000	7-inch vinyl; CD; cassette	Atlantic	
Canada	29 February 2000	CD	Atlantic	
