= The Massachusetts Daily Collegian =

American daily newspaper of the University of Massachusetts Amherst

- Type: Daily newspaper
- Format: Digital and Magazine
- Editor-in-chief: George Coulouras
- Managing editor: Daniel Estrin
- Business Manager: Katie Chon
- Founded: 1890
- Language: Primary: English; On a per-article basis: Spanish; Portuguese; Chinese; Russian; Japanese; Korean; Malay; Arabic; Italian; German; Vietnamese; French
- Headquarters: 210 Student Union; University of Massachusetts; Amherst, MA 01003; United States
- Price: Free
- Website: www.dailycollegian.com
- Free online archives: Massachusetts Daily Collegian at YouMass

The Massachusetts Daily Collegian is an American daily newspaper founded in 1890, and the independently funded, student-operated newspaper of the University of Massachusetts Amherst. In 2018, the Collegian scaled back its print edition to one issue per month, with digital-only articles continuing to be released daily. Since then, the newspaper switched to be primarily focused on online articles with print magazines being published sporadically throughout each semester.

== History ==
Founded in 1890, the paper began as Aggie Life, became the College Signal in 1901, the Weekly Collegian in 1914 and the Tri-Weekly Collegian in 1956. Published daily from 1967 to 2013 and as a broadsheet since January 1994, the Collegian cut its Friday print paper in September 2013 due to declining ad revenue.^{,} Publishing in 13 languages, it is also the most linguistically diverse college newspaper in the country.

Massachusetts Governor Charlie Baker cited the Collegian in an August 20, 2014 advertisement highlighting differences between himself and Democratic candidates then–Attorney General Martha Coakley and then-Treasurer Steve Grossman.

=== Multilingual publishing ===
With a goal of making the Collegian more accessible to and reflective of the University of Massachusetts and the Pioneer Valley, Rebecca Duke Wiesenberg founded the Translations Department in 2017, which translates and creates original content in 12 languages. Each language section includes at least one editor and one translator. Editors are usually native speakers who have used the target language in higher education and other formal settings, and usually have translation experience; translators are either native speakers, heritage speakers or are currently learning the target language. In April 2018, the Collegian published a special issue explaining the translation process and introducing the translators to readers.

=== Gender discrimination in the 1970s ===
Andrea Dworkin, in the essay "The Power of Words", narrated the history of a protest against gender discrimination at the Collegian in 1978. Women on the Collegian staff cited violent and discriminatory treatment in the newsroom, including threats made against Julie Melrose, women's editor, and a "hate campaign" calling activist women "lesbians". The paper's staff overturned a decision by the paper's board of directors to provide four ad-free pages per week to the women's editorial staff, and protests resulting in an occupation of the Collegian offices by women on staff began after talks between the two sides and the administration broke down.

Published in the first issue of The Massachusetts Daily Occupied Collegian, "The Power of Words" was a given as a speech at a rally supporting the occupation of the Collegian offices by women staffers who faced censorship and suppression by male editors. Several women set up a blockade and resisted efforts to remove them from the office while publishing an "insurgent" newspaper for twelve days in May 1978. The Associated Press, which called the occupation a "feminist take-over", reported that the Collegian printed from temporary offices and called the administration's refusal to remove the women from the offices "irresponsible". As of the tenth day of the protest, the women had vowed to continue the occupation into the summer vacation, the student judiciary had threatened to hold suspension hearings for occupying students, and "militant feminist" Robin Morgan had spoken during a 250-person march to the administration building.

United Press International (UPI) reported that an agreement had been reached between occupying women, Collegian editors, and the university administration, which resulted in the creation of a fact-finding committee at the suggestion of Jean Elshtain, then an associate professor of political science, and the refusal of administrators to pursue any academic penalties against the protestors. The membership of the committee consisted of four women and three men representing the stakeholders and three additional non-voting members, all appointed by Chancellor Randolph Bromery. Collegian editor William Sundstrom said that the result of the agreement was a "commitment to improve the quality and quantity of women's news", and that he was sure the women would "keep the issue alive next semester." The commission recommended separate women's pages and editorial autonomy, the original demands of the women, in September 1978. The Chancellor refused to mandate that policy and the staff of the paper did not adopt it. As of at least the 2017–2018 school year the Collegian no longer has a women's editor.

== Content ==
=== Sections ===
The newspaper is organized in five sections.

1. News: Includes Campus, SGA, Local, Five College, Environment & Technology, Health & Wellness, Profiles, Crime, Politics.
2. Opinion & Editorial: Includes Collegian Editorials, Columns, and Letters to the Editor.
3. Arts & Living: Includes Entertainment, Music, Movies, Television, Comedy, Theatre, Fine Arts, Culture, Food & Drink, Fashion.
4. Sports: Includes Basketball, Football, Columns, Hockey, Field Hockey, Soccer, Lacrosse, Baseball, Softball.
5. The Brick: Includes long-form and short form satirical content

=== Web and social media ===
Hosted online at DailyCollegian.com, the Collegian provides year-round breaking news and sports coverage. A five-fold reduction in advertising revenue, from $1 million circa 2000 to only $200,000 in 2013, accelerated the adoption of web and social media platforms. In addition to web-exclusive features, the Collegian offers all print content online at DailyCollegian.com, which provides readers with more comprehensive coverage including photographs, videos, and podcasts. Collegian staff also maintain The Massachusetts Daily Collegian on Facebook and The Massachusetts Daily Collegian on X.

=== The Brick ===
The Daily Collegian publishes a student satire section known as The Brick, modeled after satirical outlets such as The Onion. The Brick maintains a popular Instagram account where they post humorous headlines parodying the UMass Amherst community and campus events. The account is among the most followed collegiate satire magazine accounts in the United States. In addition to its online presence, The Brick also produces print humor magazines, typically released once per semester.

=== Morning Wood ===
The Collegian staff publishes The Massachusetts Morning Wood, a humor and satire paper for April Fools' Day each year on April 1 (or the nearest print date). A slimmed down version of the standard paper (with non-satirical content) is wrapped inside. Headlines for the 2014 edition included "Chancellor dissolves SGA, replaces gov't with Spice Girls" and "Impromptu elderly birthday party leads to 82 arrested", both of which lampooned major campus controversies and events of the spring 2014 semester. Since moving to a primarily digital format, Morning Wood has also been digitized. It is now published the morning of April 1st online at the website.
