= M2M (band) =

Norwegian pop duo

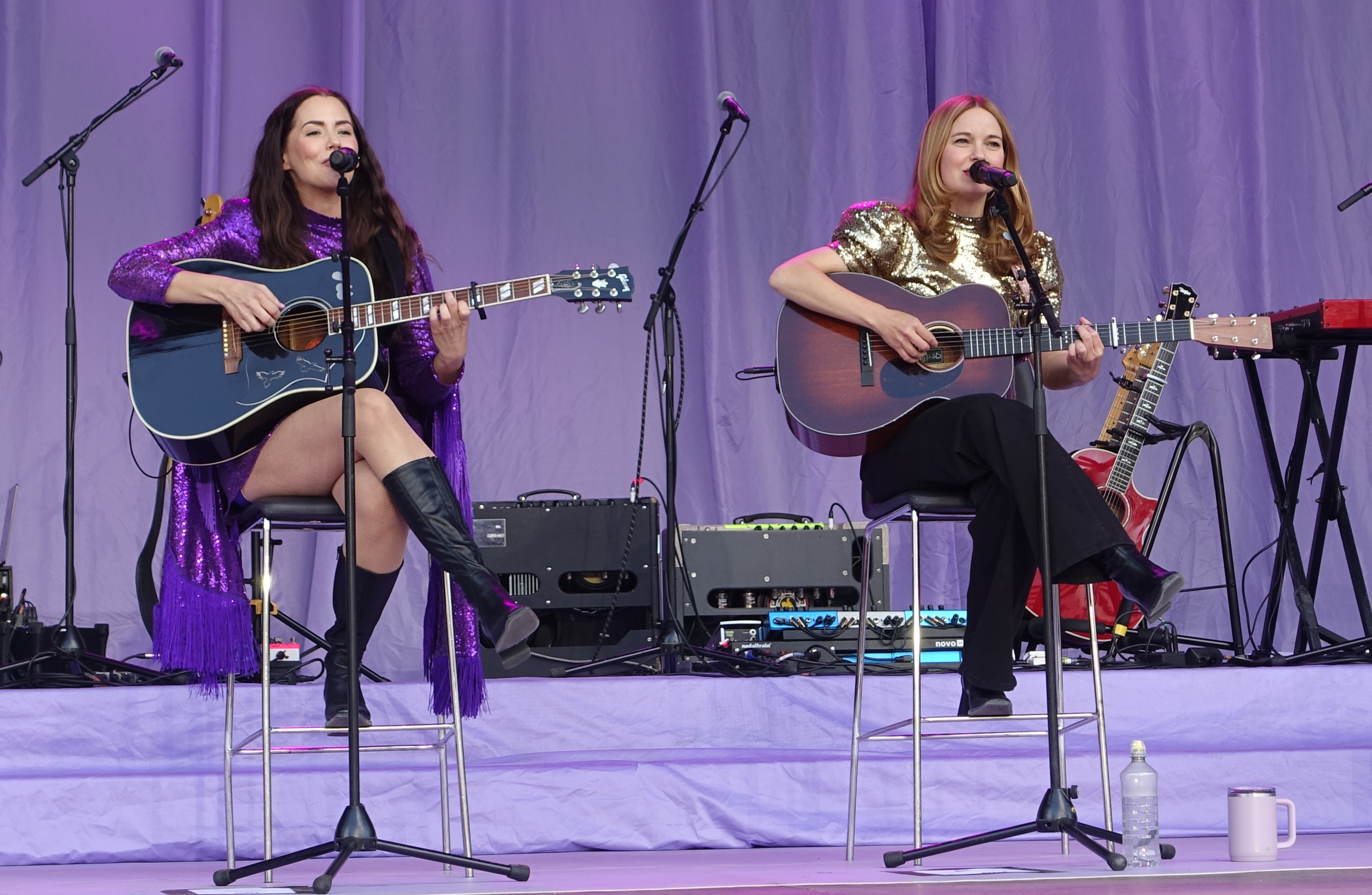
- Marion Raven (left) and Marit Larsen (right) at the festival OverOslo in 2025.

Background information
- Also known as: Marit & Marion
- Origin: Lørenskog, Norway
- Genres: Pop; bubblegum pop; teen pop; pop rock
- Instruments: Vocals; piano; keyboards; guitar
- Years active: 1996–2002; 2024–present
- Labels: EMI; Atlantic
- Members: Marit Larsen; Marion Raven
- Website: m2mofficial.com

M2M is a Norwegian pop duo comprising Marit Larsen and Marion Raven. Larsen and Raven had been friends since the age of five and formed a music duo when they were eight. They released a children's album in 1996 when Larsen was 12 and Raven was 11, under the name "Marit & Marion". The album was nominated for a Spellemannprisen award and the band changed their name to M2M after signing a record deal with Atlantic Records in 1998. M2M were frequently praised for writing most of their songs and performing their own instruments, something that was considered to set them apart from the majority of teen pop music artists.

Their debut single, "Don't Say You Love Me" (1999), was both a critical and commercial success, and remained their biggest hit. Their debut album, Shades of Purple (2000), was critically well-received and sold over 1.5 million units worldwide. Despite critical success, their second album, The Big Room (2001), did not perform as well commercially, and the duo broke up in 2002, with each pursuing a solo career. A greatest hits album, The Day You Went Away: The Best of M2M (2003), was released after they disbanded. M2M sold over 2 million albums.

After a 22-year hiatus, the duo reunited in September 2024, and announced a world tour in 2025. An EP of re-recordings of their greatest hits, titled Still in My Dreams, was released on 8 May 2025, marking their first release in over 20 years.

== Career ==
=== 1996–1998: Formation and Synger Kjente Barnesanger ===
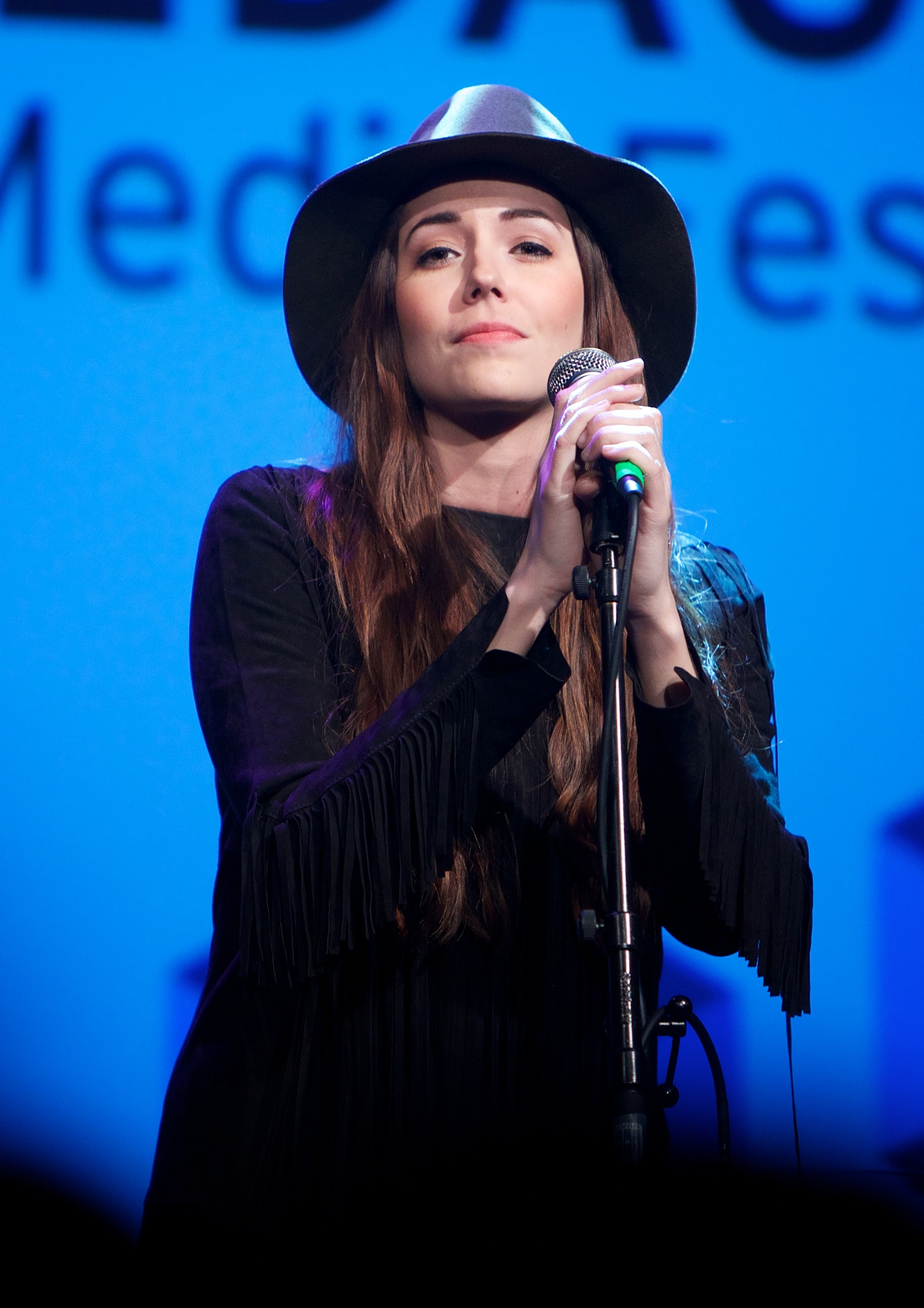
Marion Raven formed a music duo with Marit Larsen when they were both eight years old.

Marit Larsen and Marion Raven come from Lørenskog in the district east of Oslo. They met at a playground when they were five and became best friends. Discovering they had similar interests in music, they began singing together. The two girls formed a music duo when they were eight, naming it "Hubba Bubba" after their favourite bubble gum. At the time, Raven was learning to play piano, and Larsen was learning guitar. They also starred together in professional musical productions such as Annie and The Sound of Music. In 1996, when Larsen was 12 and Raven was 11, they released a children's album in Norway, Synger Kjente Barnesanger (Sing Famous Children's Songs), under the name "Marit & Marion". The album was nominated for a Spellemannprisen award. After the record's release, they started writing their own pop songs and sent demo recordings out; one of the demos ended up at Atlantic Records and they were signed to a worldwide contract in 1998. Following being offered the contract they considered shortening their name to M&M, though decided against that after discovering there was a candy that uses that name in the United States. Instead, they held a competition for fans to come up with a name, and one girl suggested M2M.

=== 1999–2000: Shades of Purple ===
As M2M, their first single was "Don't Say You Love Me". It was featured in the closing credits of the film Pokémon: The First Movie and was chosen as the lead single from the film's soundtrack, being released on 26 October 1999. Promoted by a "nonstop marketing effort", advanced airing on Radio Disney and the affiliation with Pokémon, the single experienced commercial success. It charted at No. 2 in Norway and No. 4 in both Australia and New Zealand. Additionally, it was certified Gold in both Australia and America, and was nominated for the year's best song at the 2000 Spellemannprisen awards. In November 1999, M2M performed the song on the episode "Band on the Run" of TV series One World. The duo released their debut album, Shades of Purple, in early 2000. It was well received critically, and reached No. 7 in Norway, No. 89 on the Billboard 200 and No. 1 on Top Heatseekers chart. The second single from the album, "Mirror Mirror" (2000), was certified gold in the United States. A third single, "Everything You Do" (2000), reached No. 21 on the United States Hot Dance Singles Sales.

Throughout 2000, M2M appeared on episodes of All That, Top of the Pops, Say What? Karaoke and MTV's Hot Zone. M2M performed live at Walt Disney World's Epcot park on 12 February 2000. Their performance was recorded and appeared on an episode of Disney Channel in Concert on 29 April, which focused on both M2M and BBMak. Following the Disney recording they were scheduled to perform a series of concerts at high-schools across America; in early April 2000 they had to cancel their performance at a high-school in Arlington Heights, Illinois, as they were obligated to return to Norway to meet high-schooling commitments. In June 2000, M2M were named "Discovery of the Year" by the Singapore Radio Association. In September that year, they toured the United States with Hanson, performing as the band's opening act. Despite having sold over 1 million copies of Shades of Purple and over 1.5 million singles by September 2000, M2M were still considered a risk by their investors, who at that time were only coming close to recuperating the down payment they had made to promote the duo.

=== 2001–2002: The Big Room and break-up ===
In early 2001 they were featured in Atlantic Records' "Teensation" TV concerts, which were designed to promote "rising stars". Concerts were filmed at Hard Rock Live in Florida and aired on Music Choice. M2M's second album The Big Room, was released in Asia in late 2001 and had been released worldwide by April 2002. It was considered to have a more mature, less pop-oriented sound. The first single from the album was "Everything" (2001), which reached No. 6 in Norway and No. 27 in Australia. The second single, "What You Do About Me" (2002), was less successful, only charting at No. 46 in Australia. Another track, "Don't", was made available as a promotional single in the United States. While giving a positive review of the single, Chuck Taylor said it was frustrating to see the lack of chart success of M2M's singles in America, considering the duo's talent "shines like a beacon high in the sky". The promotion for their second album included appearing on the 100th episode of Dawson's Creek and shortly thereafter they were selected as spokeswomen for the Pantene Pro-Voice concert series, a talent competition that promoted young, female songwriters in the United States. M2M were chosen as the opening act for Jewel's "This Way" tour, which commenced on 14 June 2002.

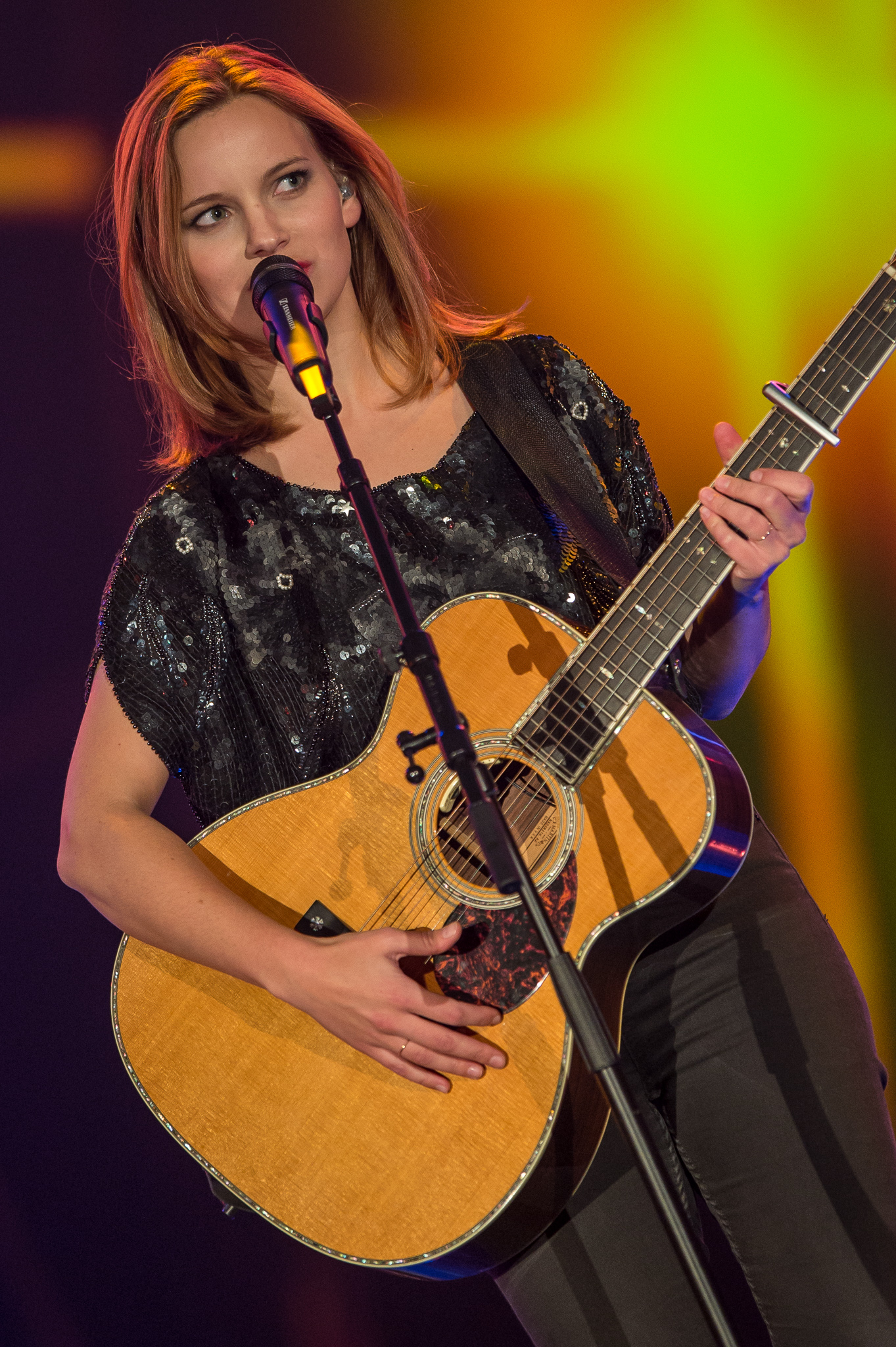
Marit Larsen released her debut solo album in 2006 and has had three number one hits in Norway.

Despite The Big Room being critically acclaimed, it was not as commercially successful as their first album, which Verdens Gang attributed to a lacklustre promotion campaign by Atlantic Records. Halfway through their tour with Jewel in mid-July, M2M were removed as the opening act by Atlantic, who cited disappointing sales of The Big Room, which at that time had sold around 100,000 units in America. Shocked and disappointed by the decision, M2M returned to Norway, and ceased performing together. Raven was immediately offered a solo record contract from Atlantic, though she later withdrew from the offer.

Interviewed in 2007, Larsen said that while the break-up was peaceful, "when [they] decided it had to end, it really had to end", adding "we started to pull each other in different directions because I wanted to make really good pop music and Marion wanted to go rock". Interviewed in 2013, Raven said that she and Larsen had always agreed they would keep performing together as long as they were having a good time, and they ended because it was not fun anymore, also saying that while they had been inseparable as children, as 18-year-olds they had become quite different. A greatest hits album, The Day You Went Away: The Best of M2M, was released in 2003. M2M sold over 2 million albums; 1.5 million albums were sold in Asia by April 2002.

=== 2004–2016: Solo careers ===
Both Larsen and Raven went on to pursue solo careers. Raven released her debut solo album Here I Am in 2005, an alternative rock album considered to be a major change from her musical style with M2M. Her debut single "Break You" (2005) remains her highest-charting solo song, reaching No. 9 in Norway. In 2006, she featured with Meat Loaf on a cover of the song "It's All Coming Back to Me Now", which found international success including reaching No. 1 in Norway. In 2014, she released Scandal Vol. 1, her third studio album. Scandal Vol. 2, the second part of the double album, was released the following year.

Larsen released her debut solo album, Under the Surface, in 2006. K. Ross Hoffman from AllMusic said the album drew equally from "folk, pop, and country". Her fifth studio album, Joni Was Right I / II, was released in 2016. Three of her singles have reached No. 1 in Norway, including "If a Song Could Get Me You" (2008), which also reached the top spot in Germany and Austria.

=== 2024–present: Reunion and Still in My Dreams ===
On September 22, 2024, Larsen and Raven posted a viral video via Instagram of them singing an acoustic version of "The Day You Went Away", also sharing a new official Instagram account for M2M and an official website. The duo later confirmed they had reunited, and later announced a world tour titled "The Better Endings Tour", performing in Indonesia, Malaysia, Hong Kong, the Philippines, Thailand, Singapore and Norway between April and June 2025. In April 2025, they announced an EP re-recording their greatest hits, titled Still in My Dreams; it was released on 8 May 2025, marking their first release of new recordings in more than 20 years.

== Critical response, musical style and legacy ==
In contrast to many other mainstream pop acts of the time, M2M wrote many of their own songs and played their own instruments, even when performing live, which is considered rare among teen pop artists. In 1999, Ron Shapiro from Atlantic Records said "What was extraordinary about them from the beginning was that they had an incredibly accessible pop sound and contemporary visual for what's happening today, coupled with a truly organic songwriting, and musical instrument prowess... It's rare to find truly mainstream contemporary pop artists today who are also extremely skilled live performance artists and talented songwriters". That same year Stephanie McGrath from AllPop.com said M2M's music "breathes fresh, brusque Norwegian air into the world of pop music dominated by Britney Spears wannabes and Orlando-born boy bands", noting that instead of typical teen subjects like true love or candy, M2M's songs were about "taking things slow or not betraying your friends". Reviewing Shades of Purple, Michael Paoletta from Billboard said the album's tracks showed a "seasoned singing style that is, quite frankly, the antithesis of teen sensations like Britney Spears", concluding "Beautifully sun-kissed, Shades of Purple is poised to be the soundtrack of spring/summer 2000."

M2M recorded The Big Room in just six days, saying they wanted to be like the Beatles or Simon & Garfunkel, who also recorded their albums quickly. Commenting on The Big Room, Karen Tye from the Herald Sun praised M2M for using "down-to-earth tunes and thoughtful lyrics" instead of revealing outfits to propel them into the limelight, unlike many of their pop counterparts. M2M described their second album as "organic pop", as they used all non-electronic instruments in recording.

In 2020, Taylor Swift listed M2M among 51 female artists who had guided and influenced her career.

== Discography ==
=== Studio albums ===
List of studio albums, with selected chart positions
Title	Album details	Peak chart positions		
Title	Album details	NOR	AUS	US
Synger Kjente Barnesanger (as Marit & Marion)	Released: 5 March 1996; Label: EMI Norway	—	—	—
Shades of Purple	Released: 7 March 2000; Label: Atlantic	7	63	89
The Big Room	Released: 9 November 2001; Label: Atlantic	16	61	—
"—" denotes a record that did not chart or was not released in that territory.

=== Compilation albums ===
List of compilation albums
Title	Album details
The Day You Went Away: The Best of M2M	Released: 15 March 2003; Label: Atlantic

=== Extended plays ===
List of extended plays
Title	Extended play details
The Acoustic EP	Recorded: 1999–2001; Released: 26 April 2019; Label: Warner / X5
Still in My Dreams	Released: 8 May 2025; Label: Warner / Atlantic / X5

=== Singles ===
List of singles, with selected chart positions and certifications
Title	Year	Peak chart positions										Certifications	Album
Title	Year	NOR	AUS	ITA	CAN	FRA	NL	NZ	SWE	UK	US	Certifications	Album
"Don't Say You Love Me"	1999	2	4	27	12	21	16	4	17	16	21	ARIA: Gold; RIAA: Gold	Shades of Purple
"Mirror Mirror"	2000	—	30	—	13	—	—	—	—	—	62	RIAA: Gold	Shades of Purple
"Everything You Do"	2000	—	103	—	—	—	—	—	—	—	— (Note: "Everything You Do" did not chart on the Billboard Hot 100, but did reach No. 21 on the Dance/Electronic Singles Sales chart.)		Shades of Purple
"Everything"	2002	6	27	37	—	—	—	44	—	—	—		The Big Room
"What You Do About Me"	2002	—	46	—	—	—	—	—	—	—	—		The Big Room
"—" denotes a title that did not chart, or was not released in that territory.

=== Music videos ===
Year	Title	Note
1999	"Don't Say You Love Me"	Pokémon version
1999	"Don't Say You Love Me"	Regular version
2000	"Mirror Mirror"	
2000	"Mirror Mirror"	Remix
2000	"Pretty Boy"	
2000	"Everything You Do"	
2000	"Everything You Do"	New vocals
2001	"The Day You Went Away"	
2001	"Girl in Your Dreams"	
2001	"Give a Little Love"	Live version
2002	"Everything"	
2002	"Everything"	Alternate version
2002	"What You Do About Me"	
2003	"Wanna Be Where You Are"	Exclusive version
2003	"Pretty Boy"	Mandarin version
2003	"Everything You Do"	Spanish version

== Awards and nominations ==
Year	Award	Category	Recipient	Result	Ref.
1996	Spellemannprisen	Best Children's Album	Synger Kjente Barnesanger	Nominated	
2000	Spellemannprisen	Best Pop Album	Shades of Purple	Nominated	
2000	Spellemannprisen	Song of the Year	"Don't Say You Love Me"	Nominated	
2000	HitAwards	Norwegian Group of the Year	M2M	Won	
2001	Spellemannprisen	Best Group	M2M	Nominated	
2001	2001 Mnet Asian Music Awards	Best International Artist	M2M	Nominated	
2002	2002 MTV Asia Awards	Favorite Pop Act	M2M	Nominated	
2025	Rockheim Hall of Fame	Hall of Fame	M2M	Nominated	
2026	Rockheim Hall of Fame	Hall of Fame	M2M	Won	
