= Peter Zizzo =

- Born: Peter Eric Zizzo; February 22, 1966 (age 60)
- Origin: New York City, U.S.
- Genres: Pop; rock
- Occupations: Record producer; songwriter; writer; musician
- Instruments: Guitar; keyboards
- Years active: 1983–present
- Labels: Universal Music Publishing; BMG Music Publishing

Peter Eric Zizzo (born February 22, 1966) is an American songwriter, music producer, musician, writer and actor. Zizzo is also a stage and television actor, having appeared in the Showtime series Billions in 2021. Zizzo has written hits for artists such as Celine Dion, Avril Lavigne, Jennifer Lopez, Marit Larsen, O.A.R., Jason Mraz, Donna Summer, Diana Ross, M2M, Cliff Richard, Clay Aiken, Howie Day, Kate Voegele, Jackie Evancho, Pixie Lott, Vanessa Carlton, and many others. He has been considered instrumental in developing the careers of artists Avril Lavigne, Vanessa Carlton in the US, and Pixie Lott in the UK. Recordings of his songs have collectively sold in excess of 100 million copies worldwide.

Zizzo has also produced songs for Nickelodeon and the Nick Jr. Channel, including the shows Middle School Moguls, The Fresh Beat Band, Blue's Clues & You! and the Nickelodeon revival of Winx Club. For Winx Club, he composed many of the episodic songs as well as the single "We Are Believix," which was sung by Victorious star Elizabeth Gillies. In 2013, Zizzo won the Daytime Emmy Award for Outstanding Music Direction and Composition for his music on The Fresh Beat Band.

== Early life ==
Born in New York to musical parents, Zizzo was initially a teen rock guitar prodigy, featured in Guitar Player magazine. As a songwriter, he got his first cut, "March", by The Weather Girls, at age 18. He attended college at Tufts University, graduating with a Bachelor's in English. Shortly thereafter, he won BMI's "Best New Songwriter" award on the heels of his first hit, the dance track "Whispers" by Corina. Zizzo found more success working alongside top 1980s producer Ric Wake on records by Celine Dion and Jennifer Lopez. It was through Wake's company that he signed his first developing artist, Billy Porter, whose A&M debut Untitled was largely written and produced by Zizzo, and featured "Love Is On The Way", the central ballad from the hit film The First Wives Club. Porter went on to win a Tony award for his starring role in Broadway's Kinky Boots.

== Entrepreneurial ventures ==
In his role of Artist Development, Zizzo discovered, developed, produced, and helped launch prominent artists such as Avril Lavigne, Vanessa Carlton, Pixie Lott, and more recently, People's "One To Watch, 2016" Hailey Knox. Zizzo has also spoken and led seminars at South by Southwest and other music industry events. Zizzo's songs and productions have sold over 100 million copies worldwide.In 2010, Zizzo's production and writing on BeBe and CeCe Winans' Still won a Grammy for Best Gospel Album.

Zizzo has also written and produced songs for several shows on Nickelodeon, including Middle School Moguls, Winx Club, The Fresh Beat Band, and the title music for Blue's Clues & You! (a reboot of Blue's Clues). His work on The Fresh Beat Band in 2013 won him an Emmy Award for best musical composition. He was nominated again the following year for Outstanding Original Song for "Spring Has Sprung", from the show Peter Rabbit.

Zizzo is also an author of short fiction and has written several screenplays, one of which, Timmy Tilson, placed in the finals in The Creative World Awards international screenplay competition.

== Partial discography ==
Year	Artist	Album/Singles	Charts	Certifactions/Awards	Credits
2012	Elizabeth Gillies	Winx Club (Nickelodeon Revival): "We Are Believix"	–	–	Producer, writer
2011	The Fresh Beat Band	A Friend Like You [single]: "A Friend Like You"	#1 on iTunes Kids Chart 5 Album	–	Producer, writer, arranger
2009	Pixie Lott	Turn It Up: "Jack"; "The Way The World Works"	UK Top 5 Album	−2× platinum (600,000+)	Producer, writer, arranger
2009	BeBe & CeCe Winans	Still: "Things feat. Marvin Winans"; "Never Thought"	US #14 Billboard Top 100 US #1 Gospel Album; US #2 R'n'B Album	Best Contemporary R&B Gospel Album 2011	Producer, writer, arranger
2009	Blake Lewis	Heartbreak on Vinyl: "The Point"	US #7 Dance & Electronic Album	–	–
2006	Stephanie McIntosh	Tightrope: "Overcome"	#4 AUS	Gold (+35,000 units sold)	Producer, co-writer
2005	Toby Lightman	Little Things: "Devils & Angels"; "The River"; "Don't Wanna Know"	Top 15 Hot AC, Top 40 Pop	–	Producer, writer, arranger
2002	Avril Lavigne	Let Go: "Nobody's Fool"; "Why" (International Releases)	–	18 Million Worldwide RIAA Diamond Award	Producer, writer, arranger
2000	M2M	Shades of Purple: "Don't Say You Love Me"	US Top 20 Radio US Sales #1 (Certified Platinum)	2 Million Worldwide	Producer, writer, arranger
1999	Jennifer Lopez	On The 6: "Promise You'll Try"	–	7 Million Worldwide	Producer, writer, arranger
1997	Celine Dion	These Are Special Times: "Don't Save It All For Christmas Day"	–	14 Million Worldwide	Writer, arranger
1996	Celine Dion	Let's Talk About Love: "Love Is on the Way"	Top 40	33 Million Worldwide RIAA Diamond Award	Writer, arranger
1994	Celine Dion	The Color of My Love: "Misled" (single) BMI Award; "Only One Road" (single)	Top 10 US Top 5 UK	16 Million Worldwide	Writer, arranger

== Filmography ==
In 2009, Zizzo played a character named after himself in the Steven Soderbergh film The Girlfriend Experience starring adult film star Sasha Grey. The film was written by Zizzo's lifelong friends Brian Koppelman and David Levien, who also named a character after him in the poker classic Rounders.

Year	Title	Role	Ref(s)
2009	The Girlfriend Experience	Zizzo	
2025	Strange Harvest	Det. Joe Kirby	
