= Kåre Christoffer Vestrheim =

Norwegian musician

Kåre Christoffer Vestrheim (born 1969) is a Norwegian record producer, musician and composer from Sarpsborg, Norway. He plays guitar and keyboards. He is also the co-founder of Propeller Recordings, which has released albums for the artists Hanne Hukkelberg, Superfamily, Katzenjammer, Moddi, Team Me and Highasakite. He has also composed film scores for Norwegian pictures.

He studied at Norges Musikkhøgskole (Norwegian State Academy of Music), and co-founded the band Locomotives with Georg Buljo in 1991; he was in the band until it dissolved in 2001. He then began producing records, and has from his studio Propeller Music Division produced several primarily Norwegian artists' albums, including Odd Nordstoga (Luring (2004)), Gåte (Iselilja (2004)), Marit Larsen (Under the Surface, (2006), The Chase (2008) and Spark, (2011)), Motorpsycho (Heavy Metal Fruit (2009)), Åge Aleksandersen (Furet værbitt (2011)), Ida Jenshus (Someone to Love (2012) and Highasakite (Silent Treatment) (2014)).

He received Gammleng-prisen in 2009 for "Best Studio Musician" and Spellemannprisen 2011 for "Record Producer of the Year". He also received Kanonprisen 2015 for "Best Film Score" for the movie Knutsen & Ludvigsen og den fæle Rasputin.

== Discography ==
=== Locomotives ===
- Spin (1997)
- Spin (Off) (1997)
- Albert (1999)
- What's Your Good Luck? (2000)

Singles/EPs

- Welcome to the House of the Locomotives (1994)
- Mind (1996)
- Flintstones (1996)
- G.R.I.L.L. (1997)
- Three Girls (1999)
- Atomic (1999)
- Hallelujah EP: The Richmond Session (2001)

=== Kiruna ===
Album

- Irun (2003)
- Tarasarus (2007)
- The River (2012)

Singles

- Black Widow (2007)

=== Amundsen ===
Album

- Amundsen (2003)

Singles

- The Moonwalker (2003)
- Band Aid (2003)

=== Appears on ===
- Silje Nergaard: On and On (1993)
- Silje Nergaard: Cow On the Highway (1993)
- Frifot: Frifot (1993)
- Ym:stammen: (Vi blir) fisk (1994)
- Eriksen: Alt vende tebage (1995)
- Trøste & Bære: Rotfylt ungdom (1995)
- Morten Harket: Tilbake til livet (1996)
- Morten Harket: Herre i drømmen (1996)
- Morten Harket: Vogts Villa (1996)
- Jan Eggum: Dingli bang (1997)
- Fabel: Flørt (1998)
- Jaga Jazzist: Magazine (1998)
- Håkon Paulsberg: Jinter – Viser av Alf Prøysen (1999)
- Diverse: Jeg gleder meg til år 2000 (1999)
- Unni Wilhelmsen: Little Mouse Me (2001)
- Black Debbath: Welcome to Norway (2001)
- Jan Eggum: Ekte Eggum (2001)
- Unni Wilhelmsen: Disconnected (2001)
- Elvin Friendly: Girls Like Us EP (2001)
- Bronco Busters: Fuzz Parade (2001)
- Krace: Pretty Things (2002)
- Gluecifer: Losing End (2002)
- Furia: Furia EP (2002)
- Gluecifer: Reversed EP (2002)
- Gluecifer: Easy Living (2002)
- Elvin Friendly: A Nice Girl Called a Bitch EP (2002)
- Gluecifer: Easy Living (2002)
- Gluecifer: Basement Apes (2002)
- Erik Faber: Century (2003)
- Hanne Hukkelberg: Cast Anchor EP (2003)
- Twinklehead: So Long (2003)
- Thom Hell: Tremendous Sinner EP (2003)
- Erik Faber: Yesterday's Call (2003)
- Erik Faber: Last Night's Boogie (2003)
- Crowtown: Marshmallow Drive (2003)
- Wholy Martin: Half (½) EP (2003)
- Diverse: Buddy – Musikk fra filmen Buddy (2003)
- Gluecifer: A Call from the Other Side (2003)
- Tigerlily: Tigerlily (2003)
- Furia: ...and Then We Married the World (2003)
- Erik Faber: Century (2003)
- Niko Valkeapää: Sierra (2004)
- Gluecifer: Automatic Thrill (2004)
- Gåte: Sjåaren (2004)
- Gåte: Sjå attende (2004)
- Hanne Hukkelberg: Do Not as I Do (2004)
- Superfamily: Champagne EP (2004)
- Gluecifer: Shaking So Bad (2004)
- Gåte: Iselilja (2004)
- Ingar Zach: Percussion Music (2004)
- Lynni Treekrem & Geir Sundstøl: Sweethearts (2004)
- Hanne Hukkelberg: Little Things (2004)
- Odd Nordstoga: Luring (2004)
- Gluecifer: Here Come the Pigs (2004)
- Elvin Friendly: Goes to Work (2004)
- Skambankt: Skambankt (2004)
- Wholy Martin: Vampire Songs (2004)
- Bjarte Hjelmeland: Barske Børnerim (for viderekomne voksne) (2004)
- Diverse: The Wire Tapper 12 (2004)
- Superfamily: You Can Go on a Dat (If you Wannu) (2005)
- Jaga Jazzist: All I Know is Tonight (2005)
- Twinklehead: Made for These Times (2005)
- Superfamily: Taxi Dancing (2005)
- Shining: In the Kingdom of Kitsch You Will Be a Monster (2005)
- Jaga Jazzist: Oslo Skyline (2005)
- Jan Eggum: 30/30 (2005)
- Klovner i kamp: Syng (2005)
- Thulsa Doom: Need the Air (2005)
- Jaga Jazzist: What We Must (2005)
- Klovner i kamp: Kjære fru Ottar (2005)
- Superfamily: Back in Paris (2005)
- Klovner i kamp: Ørnen tek ikkje unga (2005)
- Bjørn Klakegg: A Day with No Plans at All (2005)
- Mohammed: Blackbomber (2005)
- Diverse: Öya Oslo 2005 (2005)
- JR Ewing: Maelstrom (2005)
- Diverse: Check the Water (2005)
- Marit Larsen: Only a Fool (2006)
- Twinklehead: Twinklehead (2006)
- Odd Nordstoga: Heim te mor (2006)
- Hanne Hukkelberg: A Cheater's Armoury (2006)
- Odd Nordstoga: Heim te Mor (2006)
- Marit Larsen: Solid Ground (2006)
- Diverse: Uro – Soundtrack (2006)
- Diverse: Öya Oslo 2006 (2006)
- Diverse: Jazz From Norway 2006 JazzCD No 2nd Set (2006)
- Hanne Hukkelberg: Rykestrasse 68 (2006)
- Marit Larsen: Under the Surface (2006)
- Diverse: Secret Love 3 (2006)
- Glenn Erik Haugland: 3x3 – en fuglefabel (2007)
- Superfamily: Teens of the 70's (2007)
- Shining: Grindstone (2007)
- Superfamily: Warszawa (2007)
- Dinosau: A Little Crime (2007)
- Brian Melo: Livin' It (2007)
- Diverse: Øya Oslo 2007 (2007)
- Superfamily: I Could Be a Real Winner (2007)
- Superfamily: Warszawa (2007)
- Muta: Yesterday Night You Were Sleeping at My Place (2007)
- Shining: Shining (2007)
- Morten Harket: Movies (2007)
- Diverse: McMusic 42 (2007)
- Marit Larsen: If a Song Could Get Me You (2008)
- Katzenjammer: Le Pop (2008)
- Kaia Huuse: Episoder (2008)
- Katzenjammer: Tea with Cinnamon (2008)
- Morten Harket: Letter from Egypt (2008)
- Xploding Plastix: Treated Timber Resists Rot (2008)
- Katzenjammer: Der Kapitän (2008)
- Katzenjammer: Le Pop (2008)
- Huntsville: Eco, Arches & Eras (2008)
- Marit Larsen: The Chase (2008)
- Diverse: The Chronicles of Narnia: Prince Caspian – Original Soundtrack (2008)
- Diverse: Absolute Music 58 (2008)
- Diverse: McMusic Hits 2008 (2008)
- Black Debbath: Black Debbath's Beste – 10 år med Rock mot alt som er kult (2009)
- Gluecifer: Kings of Rock – B-Sides and Rarities 1994–2005 (2009)
- Trondheim Jazz Orchestra & Kobert: Trondheim Jazz Orchestra & Kobert (2009)
- Hanne Hukkelberg: Seventeen (2009)
- Eriksen: De aller beste (2009)
- Diverse: KuschelRock 23 (2009)
- Hanne Hukkelberg: Blood from a Stone (2009)
- Superfamily: Guns Tonight (2009)
- Bjørn Eidsvåg: De beste (2009)
- Motorpsycho: X-3 (Knuckleheads in Space) (2010)
- Marit Larsen: Don't Save Me (2010)
- Motorpsycho: The Visitant (2010)
- Motorpsycho: Heavy Metal Fruit (2010)
- Zanussi Five: Ghost Dance (2010)
- Marit Larsen: If a Song Could Get Me You (2010)
- Odd Nordstoga: November (2010)
- Øystein Dolmen, Lisa Gansmoe & Katzenjammer: Den lengste natten (2010)
- Åge Aleksandersen & Sambandet: Medvind (2011)
- Katzenjammer: I Will Dance (When I Walk Away) (2011)
- Åge Aleksandersen & Sambandet: Maria Magdalena (2011)
- Huntsville: For Flowers, Cars and Merry Wars (2011)
- Åge Aleksandersen & Sambandet: Furet værbitt (2011)
- Splashgirl/Huntsville: Splashgirl/Huntsville (2011)
- Juusk: Juusk (2011)
- Marit Larsen: Coming Home (2011)
- Katzenjammer: A Kiss Before You Go (2011)
- Team Me: To The Treetops! (2011)
- Marit Larsen: Spark (2011)
- Diverse: Duplex Records 25 (2011)
- Diverse: Vi tenner våre lykter – Kronprinsparets fond (2011)
- Barnas supershow: Vårt eget sted (2012)
- deLillos: Lykkelig fyr (2012)
- Vinni: God morgen Norge (2012)
- Motorpsycho & Ståle Storløkken: The Death Defying Unicorn (2012)
- Ida Jenshus: Someone to Love (2012)
- Marit Larsen: Don't Move (2012)
- Hanne Hukkelberg: Featherbrain (2012)
- Ida Jenshus: Someone to Love (2012)
- Vinni: Oppvåkningen (2012)
- deLillos: Vi er på vei, vi kanke snu (2012)
- Anne Grete Preus: Vær hos meg (2013)
- The South: The Further Inside You Go... (2013)
- Anne Grete Preus: But For the Grace (2013)
- Highasakite: Since Last Wednesday (2013)
- Huntsville: Past Increasing, Future Receding (2013)
- The South: Save You (2013)
- Anne Grete Preus: Et sted å feste blikket (2013)
- Skambankt: Voodoo (2013)
- Highasakite: Silent Treatment (2014)
- Skambankt: Sirene (2014)
- Ida Jenshus: Hero (2014)
- Harr & Hartberg: Blå matematikk/Godt forslag (2014)
- Ida Jenshus: Let It Go (2014)
- Harr & Hartberg: Døden er dårlig gjort – Med tekster av Lars Saabye Christensen (2014)
- Ida Jenshus: My Last Goodbye (2015)
- Ida Jenshus: Starting Over Again (2015)
- Kristoffer Lo: The Black Meat (2016)
- Frida Ånnevik: Her Bor (2016)
- Highasakite: Camp Echo (2016)
- Rasmus & Verdens Beste Band: Banjo På Badet (2017)
- Frida Ånnevik: Flyge Fra (2017)
- Gurls: Run Boy Run (2018)

=== Film and television scores ===
- Pittbulterje - filmscore (2005)
- Fatso - filmscore (2008)
- Buzz Aldrin, hvor ble det av deg i alt mylderet - TV-series/filmscore (2011)
- Kraftidioten - filmscore (2014)
- Kvinner i for store herreskjorter - filmscore (2015)
- Frikjent - TV-series/filmscore - Season 1&2 (2015/16)
- Knutsen & Ludvigsen og den fæle Rasputin - filmscore (2015)
- Grand Hotell - filmscore (2016)
- Eple - shortfilm - filmscore (2016)

=== Film and television soundtracks ===
- Buzz Aldrin, hvor ble det av deg i alt mylderet? - Musikken til TV-serien (2011)
- Frikjent – Musikken fra TV-serien (2015), med Mike Hartung, Kristoffer Bonsaksen og Highasakite
- Kvinner i for store herreskjorter - Musikken til spillefilmen (2015)
- Knutsen & Ludvigsen og den fæle Rasputin - Musikken til spillefilmen (2015)
