= If a Song Could Get Me You =

Compilation album

If A Song Could Get Me You

Compilation album by Marit Larsen
- Released: 14 August 2009
- Recorded: 2005–2008
- Genres: Pop, folk
- Label: Sony Music Entertainment Germany
- Producer: Kåre Christoffer Vestrheim

Marit Larsen chronology
The Chase (2008)	If A Song Could Get Me You (2009)	Spark (2011)

Singles from If a Song Could Get Me You
- 1. "If a Song Could Get Me You" Released: 24 July 2009; 2. "Under the Surface (Remake)" Released: 19 February 2010; 3. "Don't Save Me (Remake)" Released: 30 July 2010

If a Song Could Get Me You is a compilation album by Norwegian singer-songwriter Marit Larsen, released on 14 August 2009. The album was released through Sony Music Entertainment, after Larsen signed a contract with them for worldwide distribution of her albums outside of Norway, where she has been contracted to EMI for several years. The album was originally catered for the German market, where her previous two albums had not been released, after the success of lead single "If a Song Could Get Me You" in the country. The album was announced on Marit Larsen's YouTube page and Maritlarsen.de. The album consists of her songs from her previous two albums Under the Surface and The Chase. In Brazil, a different version was released in December 2010.

== Track listing ==
Standard edition
No.	Title	Writer(s)	Original album	Length
1.	"If a Song Could Get Me You"	Marit Larsen, Kåre Vestrheim	The Chase	3:22
2.	"Don't Save Me"	Larsen, Peter Zizzo	Under the Surface	3:48
3.	"This Is Me, This Is You"	Larsen	The Chase	4:07
4.	"Under the Surface"	Larsen	Under the Surface	4:14
5.	"Only a Fool"	Larsen	Under the Surface	4:06
6.	"Solid Ground"	Larsen	Under the Surface	3:26
7.	"Ten Steps"	Larsen, Zizzo	The Chase	3:31
8.	"This Time Tomorrow"	Larsen	Under the Surface	3:20
9.	"I've Heard Your Love Songs"	Larsen	The Chase	3:38
10.	"The Chase"	Larsen	The Chase	3:33
11.	"Is It Love"	Larsen	The Chase	4:51
12.	"Steal My Heart"	Larsen	The Chase	3:48
13.	"Poison Passion"	Larsen	Under the Surface	3:00
Total length:				48:18

German iTunes bonus tracks
No.	Title	Writer(s)	Original album	Length
14.	"In Came the Light"	Larsen	Under the Surface	1:12
15.	"If a Song Could Get Me You" (Video)			3:26
16.	"Track by Track" (Video)			5:57
17.	"Celebrity Playlist" (Video)			3:13
Total length:				1:02:06

Special Edition
No.	Title	Writer(s)	Original album	Length
1.	"If a Song Could Get Me You"	Marit Larsen, Kåre Vestrheim	The Chase	3:22
2.	"Don't Save Me"	Larsen, Zizzo	Under the Surface	3:48
3.	"Only a Fool"	Larsen	Under the Surface	4:06
4.	"Under the Surface"	Larsen	Under the Surface	4:14
5.	"Fuel"	Larsen	The Chase	2:04
6.	"This Is Me, This Is You"	Larsen	The Chase	4:07
7.	"Solid Ground"	Larsen	Under the Surface	3:26
8.	"Ten Steps"	Larsen, Zizzo	The Chase	3:31
9.	"This Time Tomorrow"	Larsen	Under the Surface	3:20
10.	"Addicted"	Larsen, Vestrheim	The Chase	3:41
11.	"I've Heard Your Love Songs"	Larsen	The Chase	3:38
12.	"The Chase"	Larsen	The Chase	3:33
13.	"Is It Love"	Larsen	The Chase	4:51
14.	"Steal My Heart"	Larsen	The Chase	3:48
15.	"Poison Passion"	Larsen	Under the Surface	3:00
16.	"Out of My Hands (feat. Milow)"	Jonathan Vandenbroeck, Kit Hain	Milow	3:29
17.	"In Came the Light"	Larsen	Under the Surface	1:12
Total length:				58:26

If a Song Could Get Me You – Special Edition – Bonus DVD
No.	Title	Length
18.	"The Chase" (Acoustic Live at Theater am Oberanger, München)	3:41
19.	"Solid Ground" (Acoustic Live at Theater am Oberanger, München)	3:27
20.	"Ten Steps" (Acoustic Live at Theater am Oberanger, München)	3:22
21.	"Don't Save Me" (Acoustic Live at Theater am Oberanger, München)	3:55
22.	"Only a Fool" (Acoustic Live at Theater am Oberanger, München)	4:16
23.	"If a Song Could Get Me You" (Acoustic Live at Theater am Oberanger, München)	3:25
24.	"Fuel" (Acoustic Live at Theater am Oberanger, München)	2:30
25.	"The Chase" (Video) (Acoustic Live at Theater am Oberanger, München)	3:27
26.	"Solid Ground" (Video) (Acoustic Live at Theater am Oberanger, München)	3:25
27.	"Ten Steps" (Video) (Acoustic Live at Theater am Oberanger, München)	3:19
28.	"Don't Save Me" (Video) (Acoustic Live at Theater am Oberanger, München)	3:53
29.	"Only a Fool" (Video) (Acoustic Live at Theater am Oberanger, München)	4:09
30.	"If a Song Could Get Me You" (Video) (Acoustic Live at Theater am Oberanger, München)	3:18
31.	"Fuel" (Video) (Acoustic Live at Theater am Oberanger, München)	2:17
32.	"If a Song Could Get Me You" (Video)	3:26
33.	"Under The Surface" (Video)	4:08
34.	"Don't Save Me" (Video)	3:50
35.	"Fuel" (Video)	1:57
36.	"Making of "If a Song Could Get Me You"" (Video)	2:30
37.	"Making of "Under the Surface"" (Video)	4:34
38.	"Making of "Don't Save Me"" (Video)	4:58
39.	"Track By Track" (Video)	5:57
40.	"Celebrity Playlist" (Video)	3:13

Brazilian Edition
No.	Title	Writer(s)	Original album	Length
1.	"If a Song Could Get Me You"	Marit Larsen, Kåre Vestrheim	The Chase	3:22
2.	"Don't Save Me"	Larsen, Peter Zizzo	Under the Surface	3:48
3.	"This Is Me, This Is You"	Larsen	The Chase	4:07
4.	"Ten Steps"	Larsen, Zizzo	The Chase	3:31
5.	"Under the Surface"	Larsen	Under the Surface	4:14
6.	"Only a Fool"	Larsen	Under the Surface	4:06
7.	"Addicted"	Larsen, Vestrheim	The Chase	3:41
8.	"Fuel"	Larsen	The Chase	2:01
9.	"Solid Ground"	Larsen	Under the Surface	3:26
10.	"This Time Tomorrow"	Larsen	Under the Surface	3:20
11.	"I've Heard Your Love Songs"	Larsen	The Chase	3:38
12.	"The Chase"	Larsen	The Chase	3:33
13.	"Is It Love"	Larsen	The Chase	4:51
14.	"Steal My Heart"	Larsen	The Chase	3:48
Total length:				51:23

== Singles ==
Year	Single	German Singles Chart	Austrian Singles Chart	Swiss Singles Chart
2009	If a Song Could Get Me You	1	1	2
2010	Under the Surface	37	64	—
2010	Don't Save Me	47	73	63
2010	Out of My Hands (feat. Milow)	17	44	21
2011	Fuel	—	—	—

== Charts ==
=== Weekly charts ===
Chart (2009)	Peak position
Austrian Albums (Ö3 Austria)	7
European Albums (Billboard)	10
German Albums (Offizielle Top 100)	3
Swiss Albums (Schweizer Hitparade)	2

=== Year-end charts ===
Chart (2009)	Position
Austrian Albums (Ö3 Austria)	63
German Albums (Offizielle Top 100)	52
Swiss Albums (Schweizer Hitparade)	44

== Certifications ==
Region	Certification	Certified units/sales
Austria (IFPI Austria)	Gold	10,000^{*}
Germany (BVMI)	Platinum	200,000^{^}
Switzerland (IFPI Switzerland)	Gold	15,000^{^}
^{*} Sales figures based on certification alone.^{^} Shipments figures based on certification alone.
