= Hasse Rosbach =

Norwegian musician and producer

- Genres: Pop, rock, jazz, folk, experimental
- Occupations: Record producer, audio engineer, mixer, musician
- Instruments: guitar, bass, keyboards, percussion
- Years active: 2001 – present

Hasse Rosbach is a Norwegian record producer, audio engineer, mixer and musician known for his cross-genre work with Norwegian and international artists.

== Career ==
Rosbach began his career at Propeller Music Division in Oslo, working under Mike Hartung and Kåre Chr. Vestrheim. During this time he contributed to Norwegian albums for artists such as Marit Larsen, Odd Nordstoga, Motorpsycho, Hanne Hukkelberg and Shining while establishing himself as an independent producer and engineer.

Since then he has collaborated with artists including Moddi, Turbonegro, Highasakite, Team Me, Bushman’s Revenge, Maria Mena, Mathias Eick and others, across genres such as pop, rock, jazz, folk and experimental music.

He has arranged and orchestrated works for the Trondheim Soloists and the Norwegian Radio Orchestra (KORK), and served as musical director and arranger for Moddi’s Unsongs tour with the Trondheim Soloists, which concluded with a performance at the Norwegian National Opera and Ballet.

Rosbach was a member of the Norwegian indie rock band Superfamily, which won a Norwegian Grammy (Spellemannprisen) for their album Warszawa. In 2010 he took part in Jan Van Woensel and Lee Ranaldo’s (Sonic Youth) exhibition Bad Moon Rising 5 as part of the experimental project OFAG.

He co-founded and operates Albatross Recorders, a recording studio shared with Even Ormestad and Martin Sjølie.
