= The Chase (Marit Larsen album) =

Studio album by Marit Larsen
- Released: October 13, 2008
- Recorded: 2008
- Genre: Pop, folk
- Length: 37:25
- Label: EMI
- Producer: Kåre Christoffer Vestrheim

Marit Larsen chronology
Under the Surface (2006)	The Chase (2008)	If a Song Could Get Me You (2009)

Singles from The Chase
- 1. "If a Song Could Get Me You" Released: August 4, 2008; 2. "I've Heard Your Love Songs (Radio release only)" Released: October 20, 2008; 3. "Addicted (Radio release only)" Released: September 3, 2009

Professional ratings
Review scores
Source	Rating
AllMusic	4/5 stars
Slant Magazine	4/5 stars
Aftenposten	5/6 stars
NRK P3	5/6 stars
GAFFA.dk	4/6 stars

The Chase is the second album from Norwegian singer-songwriter Marit Larsen. It was released on October 13, 2008. The first single of this album entitled "If a Song Could Get Me You" was made available via Marit Larsen's Myspace page on August 11, 2008.

== Track listing ==
No.	Title	Writer(s)	Length
1.	"The Chase"	Marit Larsen	3:31
2.	"If a Song Could Get Me You"	Larsen, Kåre Vestrheim	3:30
3.	"This Is Me, This Is You"	Larsen	4:05
4.	"Ten Steps"	Larsen, Peter Zizzo	3:26
5.	"Steal My Heart"	Larsen	3:44
6.	"Is It Love"	Larsen	4:47
7.	"Fuel"	Larsen	2:04
8.	"Addicted"	Larsen, Kåre Vestrheim	3:41
9.	"I've Heard Your Love Songs"	Larsen	3:43
10.	"Fences"	Larsen	4:52
Total length:			37:24

== Chart ==
Chart (2008)	Peak position
Norwegian Albums Chart	1

== Singles ==
Year	Single	Norwegian Singles Chart	Norwegian Radio Chart
2008	"If a Song Could Get Me You"	1	1
2008	I've Heard Your Love Songs	21	3
2009	Addicted	–	10

== Technical credits ==
- Marit Larsen – Vocals, arranger, Piano, Mandolin, Acoustic Guitar, Electric Guitar, Glockenspiel, Zither, Harmonica, Celeste, Hand Claps, Church Organ.
- Kåre Christoffer Vestrheim – Producer, arranger, Piano, Harpsichord, Celeste, Cowbell, Hand Claps, Accordion, Electric Guitar.
- Geir Sundstøl – Acoustic Guitar, Lap Steel Guitar, Mandolin, Harmonica, Harp, Dobro.
- Michael Hartung – Acoustic Guitar, Hand Claps.
- Erland Dahlen – Drums, Percussion.
- Torstein Lofthus – Drums.
- Kåre Opheim – Drums.
- Even Ormestad, Thomas Tofte, Eirik Øien – Bass.
- Odd Nordstoga – Acoustic Guitar, Guitar.
- Henning Sandsdalen – Lap Steel Guitar.
- Ørnulf Brun Snotheim – Electric Guitar.
- Trude Eick – French Horn.
- Eilert Mose – Piccolo Trumpet.
- Marius Graff – Nylon String Guitar, Banjo
- Andrik Orvik, Alyson Read, Jørn Hallbakken, Øyvind Fossheim, Vegar Johnsen – Violins.
- Dorte Dreier, Cathrine Bullock, Åshild Nyhus, Ida Bryhn, Stig Ove Ose – Violas.
- Geir Larsen, Anne Årdal, Hans Groh, Cecilia Gøtestam, Paulin Voss – Cellos.
- Choir on "Is It Love" – Line Horntveth Vera Øian, Yngvild Flikke, Nina Ramberg, Caroline Hartung, Thom Hell, Christer Knutsen, Peer Øian, Hasse Rosbach
- Artwork – Gina Rose Design
- Photography – Julie Pike

== Certifications ==
Country	Certifications	Sales/Shipments
Norway	Platinum	50,000+
