= Don't Save Me =

Don't Save Me may refer to:

- "Don't Save Me" (Marit Larsen song), 2006
- "Don't Save Me" (Haim song), 2012
- "Don't Save Me" (Willow song), 2021
