= As the Light Does the Shadow =

Studio album by Funeral
- Released: September 22, 2008
- Genre: Gothic doom
- Length: 70:34
- Label: Indie Recordings

Funeral chronology
| From These Wounds (2006) | As the Light Does the Shadow (2008) | Oratorium (2012) |

As the Light Does the Shadow is the fifth studio album by the Norwegian funeral doom band Funeral. It was released on September 22, 2008. It is their first album to be released through Indie Recordings.

== Track listing ==
1. "The Will to Die" - 6:18
2. "Those Fated to Fall" - 7:31
3. "The Strength to End It" - 7:31
4. "The Elusive Light" - 6:32
5. "In the Fathoms of Wit and Reason" - 8:00
6. "Towards the End" - 7:14
7. "Let Us Die Alone" - 6:59
8. "The Absence of Heaven" - 8:14
9. "Hunger" - 9:17
10. "Fallen One" - 4:18

== Personnel ==
=== Line-up ===
- Anders Eek - drums
- Frode Forsmo - vocals, bass
- Mats Lerberg - guitar, vocals
- Erlend E. Nybø - guitar

=== Session musician ===
- Jon Borgerud - synthesizer

=== Guest musician ===
- Robert Lowe - vocals on "In the Fathoms of Wit and Reason"
