= Superfamily =

Superfamily may refer to:

- Protein superfamily
  - Superfamily database
- Superfamily (taxonomy), a taxonomic rank
- Superfamily (linguistics), also known as macrofamily
- Font superfamily, a large typographic family
- Superfamily (band), a Norwegian pop band
- "Super Family", a group of comic characters
