= When the Morning Comes (Marit Larsen album) =

Studio album by Marit Larsen
- Released: October 20, 2014
- Recorded: 2014
- Genre: Pop, folk
- Label: Warner Music Group
- Producer: Marit Larsen

Marit Larsen chronology
Spark (2011)	When the Morning Comes (2014)	Joni was Right I / II (2016)

Singles from When the Morning Comes
- 1. "I Don't Want to Talk About It" Released: 4 August 2014; 2. "Faith & Science" Released: 30 January 2015; 3. "Please Don't Fall for Me" Released: 6 March 2015; 4. "Traveling Alone" Released: 31 July 2015

Professional ratings
Review scores
Source	Rating
NRK P3	5/6 stars
GAFFA.com	4/6 stars
Dagbladet	5/6 stars
Bergens Tidende	5/6 stars
Adressa	6/6 stars
Aftenposten	5/6 stars
Romerikes Blad	5/6 stars
Verdens Gang	4/6 stars

When the Morning Comes is the fourth album from Norwegian singer-songwriter Marit Larsen, and was released on 20 October 2014 in the Nordic countries by Warner Music Norway. On 27 March 2015, Sony Music Germany released the album in Germany, Switzerland and Austria. On 29 January 2016 it was released in the United States.

On 14 July 2014, Marit Larsen made the premiere of the single "I Don't Want to Talk About It" on NRK P3 radio. The single was released on 4 August on iTunes, Google Play, Spotify and WiMP. The accompanying music video was released on her YouTube channel on 6 October.

The re-release of the album by Sony Music Germany has an alternate album cover, and is entitled the "Deluxe Edition", containing an additional five acoustic live tracks and a bonus track. The album produced four singles; "I Don't Want To Talk About It", "Faith & Science", "Please Don't Fall For Me" and "Traveling Alone".

== Track listing ==
No.	Title	Writer(s)	Length
1.	"Please Don't Fall for Me"	Marit Larsen, Tofer Brown	03:14
2.	"Faith & Science"	Larsen, Seth Jones	03:18
3.	"I'd Do It All Again"	Larsen, Brown	03:18
4.	"I Don't Want to Talk About It"	Larsen, Greg Holden	03:21
5.	"Shine On (Little Diamond)"	Larsen, Brown	03:27
6.	"Before You Fell"	Larsen, Brown	04:17
7.	"Lean On Me, Lisa"	Larsen, Phillip LaRue	03:14
8.	"Traveling Alone"	Larsen, Jones	02:32
9.	"Consider This"	Larsen, Jones	04:23
10.	"When the Morning Comes"	Larsen, Brown	03:31
Total length:			34:35

Sony Music Germany "Deluxe Edition" bonus tracks
No.	Title	Writer(s)	Length
11.	"I Don't Want to Talk About It" (Live & Acoustic @ Filtr Sessions)	Larsen, Holden	3:09
12.	"Shine On (Little Diamond)" (Live & Acoustic @ Filtr Sessions)	Larsen, Brown	3:05
13.	"When the Morning Comes" (Live & Acoustic @ Filtr Sessions)	Larsen, Brown	2:57
14.	"If a Song Could Get Me You" (Live & Acoustic @ Filtr Sessions)	Larsen, Kåre Vestrheim	3:18
15.	"I Love You Always Forever" (Live & Acoustic @ Filtr Sessions)	Donna Lewis	3:28
16.	"I Don't Want to Talk About It" (Achtabahn Radio Mix)	Larsen, Holden	3:01

== Charts ==
Chart (2014–15)	Peak position
German Albums (Offizielle Top 100)	71
Norwegian Albums (VG-lista)	1
Swiss Albums (Schweizer Hitparade)	53
