= From These Wounds =

Studio album by Funeral
- Released: December 4, 2006
- Recorded: 2004 at Vektor Facilities in Norway
- Genre: Gothic doom
- Length: 57:18
- Label: Tabu Recordings (Norway); Candlelight Records (Worldwide)
- Producer: Kjetil Ottersen; Funeral

Funeral chronology
In Fields of Pestilent Grief (2002)	From These Wounds (2006)	As the Light Does the Shadow (2008)

Professional ratings
Review scores
Source	Rating
Allmusic	4/5 stars
Heavymetal.no	10/10 stars

From These Wounds is the fourth studio album by the Norwegian doom metal band Funeral. The Norwegian digipak version is limited and comes with the bonus track "Breathing Through You", which is originally written by former member Thomas Angell and later modified by Ottersen and Forsmo. The American version also features that bonus track. The cover artwork is designed by Kjetil Ottersen, credited under the alias SENSE:VERSUS.

== Track listing ==
All music by Kjetil Ottersen and Funeral, except "Breathing Through You" written by Thomas Angell and Kjetil Ottersen. Choir sample on "This Barren Skin" is taken from "Lesson III for Maundy Thursday" composed by Orlande de Lassus and performed by the Oxford Camerata. Lyrics as noted.

1. "This Barren Skin" - 8:10 (K. Ottersen)
2. "From These Wounds" - 7:42 (F. Forsmo)
3. "The Architecture of Loss" - 9:02 (F. Forsmo)
4. "Red Moon" - 8:32 (F. Forsmo)
5. "Vagrant God" - 6:15 (K. Ottersen)
6. "Pendulum" - 9:13 (F. Forsmo)
7. "Saturn" - 8:24 (F. Forsmo)
8. "Breathing Through You" - 7:23 (Bonus track) (F. Forsmo)

== Band Line-up ==
- Frode Forsmo - Vocals, Bass, Lyrics
- Kjetil Ottersen - Guitars, Electronics, Lyrics
- Christian Loos - Guitars
- Anders Eek - Drums
- Jon Borgerud - Live electronics (session member)

== Release history ==
Country	Release date
Norway	December 4, 2006
Worldwide	March 20, 2007
