= Funeral (band) =

Norwegian doom metal band

- Origin: Drammen, Norway
- Genres: Funeral doom, death/doom metal, gothic metal
- Years active: 1991–present
- Labels: Arctic Serenades, Tabu Records, Indie Recordings
- Members: Eirik Krokfjord; Marcus Granlien; Rune Arnesen; Anders Eek; Mattias Thedens; William Fossheim
- Past members: Frode Forsmo; Kjetil Ottersen; Einar André Frederiksen; Christian Loos; Thomas Angell; Idar Burheim; Oysten Rustad; Hanne Hukkelberg; Toril Snyen; Sarah Eick

Funeral are a Norwegian doom metal band formed in 1991 by Thomas Angell and Anders Eek; soon afterward, Einar Frederiksen joined as bassist and songwriter and Christian Loos joined as guitarist. They are known as one of the pioneers of the funeral doom genre.

== History ==
In 1993, the band recorded their first demo, entitled Tristesse, released the following year as a mini CD by an American record label. According to the official Funeral website this demo won them the title of "the most depressing band in the world". Funeral then made a decision to turn more symphonic and the result was shown on their demo Beyond All Sunsets. In 1994 the band became one of the first doom metal bands to recruit a female vocalist, Toril Snyen. In 1995 they released the album Tragedies. In the same year, they parted with Toril Snyen.

The following year they went to England and recorded ten tracks at Academy Studios without vocals (because of lack of a vocalist) and worked with such bands as My Dying Bride, Anathema and Cradle of Filth. Later the band recruited Sarah Eick as their female vocalist and finished five of the ten tracks, resulting in To Mourn Is a Virtue, also known as "Demo '97" in 1997. The 5 track demo CD is very rare as there were only a few copies distributed to record companies, radio stations and serious fanzines worldwide.

Again the band had to part with their vocalist. However, they quickly found a replacement and Hanne Hukkelberg was placed on the line-up as she had a good knowledge of music and was suitable for the band. Funeral produced another demo in 1999 entitled The Passion Play, also known as "Demo '99", and it is once again rare as it was only distributed to record labels, radio stations and fanzines. In 2002, they released their album In Fields of Pestilent Grief through the Italian label Nocturnal Music.

In January 2003, bassist/songwriter Einar Frederiksen committed suicide on January 10 and the band was on hiatus for the rest of the year.

In 2004, four of the ten Academy-tracks (originally recorded in 1997) were partly re-written, and was Frode Forsmo's first work as Funeral singer. This was intended as a new demo, but ended up not being released, as totally new material was written.

2005 saw the band recording a new nine-track album.

In April 2006, the Finnish label Firedoom Records released the remastered and re-released version of Tragedies and Tristesse as a double album, with unreleased bonus-tracks taken from the Beyond All Sunsets Sessions and the Tragedies Sessions from 1994 and 1995. Included on the re-release there are unpublished pictures and poems, as well as new cover art.

Autumn 2006 saw Funeral sign with the Norwegian label Tabu Recordings.

On October 28, 2006, tragedy again struck, as guitarist Christian Loos died. To yet again fulfill the line-up, Mats Lerberg was recruited as guitarist.

The album From These Wounds was released on Candlelight Records on December 4, 2006.

2007 saw Kjetil Ottersen depart, later being replaced by Erlend Nybø.

On September 22, 2008, Funeral released another album, titled As the Light Does the Shadow.

On March 13, 2009, the band posted on Myspace that they had fourteen new songs with a total time of over 100 minutes in pre-production. On July 28, 2009, the band also posted on Myspace that there was a medley of songs from the upcoming album. Considering that there are 17 songs in the making, the band went on to state that a double album is possible. Roger Bjørge will be helping out with orchestration.

On April 26, 2010, it was announced on the Funeral website that they had parted ways with vocalist/bassist Frode Forsmo.

The album To Mourn is a Virtue was released on May 24, 2011, the first four tracks feature Frode Forsmo on vocals, the next four feature Oysten Rustad and the final track is a remastering of a song recorded at Academy studio in England for the 1997 demo with Sarah Eick.

Sindre Nedland (In Vain) was the vocalist for the next three Funeral albums, until his death from cancer on March 2, 2025.

== Discography ==
=== Studio albums ===
- Tragedies (1995)
- In Fields of Pestilent Grief (2002)
- From These Wounds (2006)
- As the Light Does the Shadow (2008)
- To Mourn Is a Virtue (demo re-recording) (2011)
- Oratorium (2012)
- Praesentialis in Aeternum (2021)
- Gospel of Bones (2024)

=== Demos ===
- Tristesse (1993)
- Beyond All Sunsets (1994)
- To Mourn Is a Virtue (1997)
- The Passion Play (1999)
- Demo 2008 (2008)

== Members ==
=== Current members ===
- Anders Eek – drums (1991–present)
- Marcus Granlien – guitars (2025–present)
- William Fossheim – bass, growling (2026–present)
- Rune Arnesen - guitars, vocals (2024–present)
- Mattias Thedens - violin, hardanger fiddle, vocals (2025-present)

=== Former members ===
- Eirik Krokfjord - lead vocals (2022–2026)
- Mats Lerberg – guitars, backing vocals (2007–2017)
- Frode Forsmo – vocals, bass, lyrics (2004–2010)
- Kjetil Ottersen – guitars, bass, synth/keyboards, programming, songwriting & lyrics (2001–2007)
- Einar André Frederiksen – bass, vocals (1991–2003) (died 2003)
- Christian Loos – guitars (1991–2006) (died 2006)
- Thomas Angell – guitars (1991–1997)
- Idar Burheim – guitars (1999–2003)
- Oysten Rustad – vocals (2010)
- Hanne Hukkelberg – vocals (1999–2003)
- Toril Snyen – vocals (1994–1995)
- Sarah Eick – vocals (1997)
- Jon Borgerud – live synth/keyboards (2007-2017)
- Sindre Nedland – vocals (2010–2025) (died 2025)
