= Level & Tyson =

Norwegian band

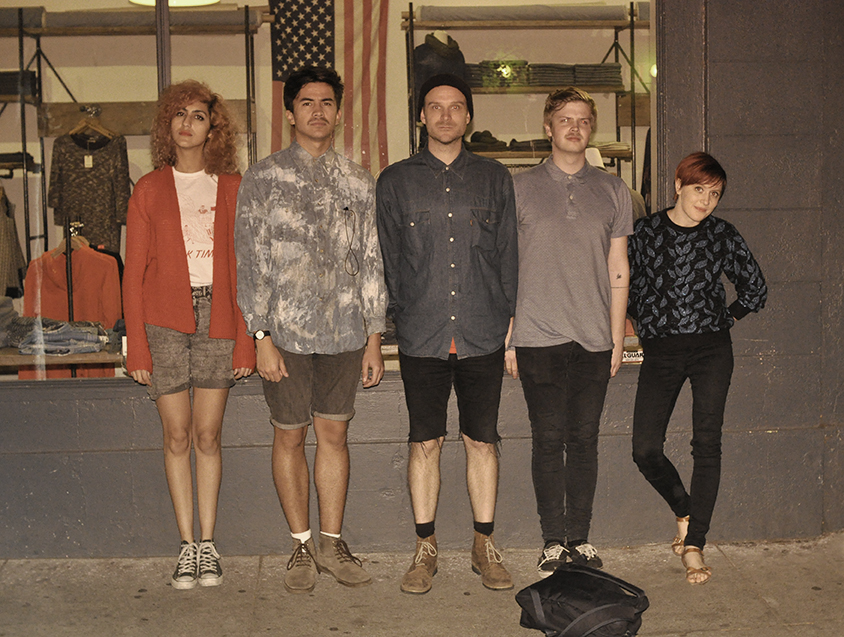
- Level & Tyson photographed in San Francisco

Background information
- Origin: Oslo, Norway
- Genres: Slacker pop, Alternative rock
- Years active: 2011–present
- Labels: DIG!, Leisure Music, Das Kirurg, Tuba, Luckee Records
- Members: Richard Lorentz Johansen; Sofie Søndervik Sæther; Namra Saleem; Jokaim Kristiansen; Hampus Sjöstedt
- Past members: Jobo Engh; Jun Christian Villanueva
- Website: www.levelandtyson.com

Level & Tyson is a Norwegian slacker pop band, consisting of Richard Noir, Sofie Søndervik Sæther, Namra Saleem, Joakim Kristiansen and Hampus Sjöstedt.

== History ==
=== Formation and Even Faster Still ===
Richard Noir started the band while still playing drums for Superfamily, writing songs for Even Faster Still when Noir and Sæther lived together in Paris. The album was partly recorded in their apartment in Paris, and partly at Propeller Studio in Oslo together with the producer Thomas Tofte. The record was released in 2012.

"Even Faster Still" is a phrase from a self-hypnosis course.

=== Mr. Teenager and touring ===
In 2014 Level & Tyson released Mr. Teenager, a stand-alone single collaborating with Japanese noise musician Sakamoto Hiromichi. The collaboration was an initiative from Noir and Sæther after watching "We Don’t Care About Music Anyway", a documentary about Japanese noise music.

Level & Tyson visited USA for the first time at the Culture Collide festival in October 2014. The Huffington Post marked their San Francisco concert as "refreshingly unique", whilst Buzzbands LA said their LA-concert "perhaps made rock music as intimate as it could get".

=== Gruesome Twosome ===
The band released the first single Tied Up on 7 May 2015, followed by No Fun My Head on 4 September. CMJ premiered the second single a week early, announcing the track list and release date of the upcoming album. The album was scheduled to be released 25 September.

== Discography ==
=== Studio albums ===
- Even Faster Still (Das Kirurg/Tuba, 2012)
- Gruesome Twosome (DIG!, 2015)

=== Singles ===
- Mr. Teenager feat. Sakamoto Hiromichi (Luckee Records/Das Kirurg, 2014)
- Tied Up (Leisure Music, 2015)
- No Fun My Head (DIG!, 2015)
