= Tragedies (album) =

Studio album by Funeral
- Released: 1995
- Genre: Funeral doom; death-doom
- Length: 58:39 (Tragedies); 138:56 (with Tristesse)
- Label: Arctic Serenades; Firebox Records (rerelease)

Funeral chronology
Tristesse (1994)	Tragedies (1995)	In Fields of Pestilent Grief (2002)

Tragedies is the first full-length album by the Norwegian funeral doom/death metal band Funeral. Track one of the album, "Taarene" is sung in Norwegian, while the other four tracks are sung in English. The album contains three original tracks and two from the Beyond All Sunsets demo. It was originally released through Arctic Serenades, then rereleased through Firebox Records, along with the Tristesse demo and three bonus tracks. In 1994, shortly before the release of this album, Funeral recruited a female vocalist named Toril Snyen. Funeral was one of the first doom metal bands to do so. Late in 1995, Funeral would part ways with Snyen. Tragedies was one of the albums that helped form the subgenre of funeral doom.

== Track listing ==
No.	Title	Length
1.	"Taarene"	12:25
2.	"Under Ebony Shades"	13:32
3.	"Demise"	8:43
4.	"When Nightfall Clasps"	14:20
5.	"Moment in Black"	9:39
Total length:		58:39

=== Rereleased track listing ===
==== Disc 1 (Tragedies) ====
No.	Title	Length
1.	"Taarene"	12:25
2.	"Under Ebony Shades"	13:32
3.	"Demise"	8:43
4.	"When Nightfall Clasps"	14:20
5.	"Moment in Black"	9:39
6.	"Forlorn" (bonus track)	11:39
Total length:		70:18

==== Disc 2 (Tristesse) ====
No.	Title	Length
1.	"Thoughts of Tranquility"	9:25
2.	"A Poem for the Dead"	18:20
3.	"Yearning for Heaven"	10:20
4.	"Heartache" (bonus track)	13:36
5.	"Dying (Together as One)" (bonus track)	16:57
Total length:		68:38
