= Joni Was Right I / II =

Joni was Right I / II

Studio album by Marit Larsen
- Released: 9 September 2016
- Recorded: 2016
- Studio: Studio Bloch, Ocean Sound Recordings
- Genre: Pop, folk
- Length: 31:45
- Label: Håndbryggrecords
- Producer: Marit Larsen

Marit Larsen chronology
When the Morning Comes (2014)	Joni was Right I / II (2016)

Joni Was Right I / II is the fifth studio album from Norwegian singer-songwriter Marit Larsen, and the first material to be released on Larsen's own independent label Håndbryggrecords.

The album was initially released as two EPs. The first, Joni Was Right, was released digitally on April 1, 2016 and the second, Joni Was Right II, was released digitally on September 9, 2016. Both Part I and II were then released as a full-length album on CD and vinyl on September 9, 2016, under the title, Joni Was Right I / II, with the album entering the Norwegian album charts at No. 36 on 16 September 2016. In 2017 Larsen was awarded the Edvard Prize in the category Popular music for the album.

== Track listing ==
No.	Title	Writer(s)	Length
1.	"Running Out of Road"	Marit Larsen, Seth Jones, Tofer Brown	02:55
2.	"Morgan, I Might"	Marit Larsen, Seth Jones	03:17
3.	"No"	Marit Larsen, Tofer Brown	03:23
4.	"Hidden Heart"	Marit Larsen, Sylvie Lewis	03:01
5.	"A Stranger Song"	Marit Larsen, Sylvie Lewis	02:52
6.	"Joni was Right"	Marit Larsen, Seth Jones	02:57
7.	"Bluebelle Mountain"	Marit Larsen, Sylvie Lewis	03:20
8.	"The Circles"	Marit Larsen, Jaymay	02:43
9.	"Winter Never Lasts Forever"	Marit Larsen, Joy Williams, Seth Jones	03:46
10.	"Shelby Avenue"	Marit Larsen, Tofer Brown	03:31
Total length:			31:45

== Technical credits ==
- Marit Larsen – Vocals, Producer, Arranger, Piano, Acoustic Guitar
- Tor Egil Kreken – Bass, Banjo, Percussion
- Mari Sandvær Kreken – Backing Vocals, Dulcimer, Acoustic Guitar, Percussion
- Christer Slaaen – Acoustic Guitar, Electric Guitar, Mandolin, Piano
- Kristoffer Lo – Brass (Track 6, 8, 9, 10)
- Isa Caroline Holmesland – Violin, Viola (Track 2)
- Kaja Fjellberg Pettersen – Cello (Track 2)
- Andreas Eide Larsen – Recording Engineer
- Bjarne Stensli – Mixing
- George Tanderø – Mastering
- Ingrid Pop – Photography
- Overhaus – Design

== Charts ==
Year	Chart positions	Certification
Year	NOR	Certification
2016	36	-

== Release history ==
Title	Format	Country	Label	Catalogue no.	Release date
Joni Was Right	EP(promotional release), Digital	NOR	Håndbryggrecords		April 1, 2016
Joni Was Right II	Digital	NOR	Håndbryggrecords		September 9, 2016
Joni Was Right I / II	Digital	EU	Håndbryggrecords	NOJF1601060	September 9, 2016
