= Hunndalen =

- Rural settlement
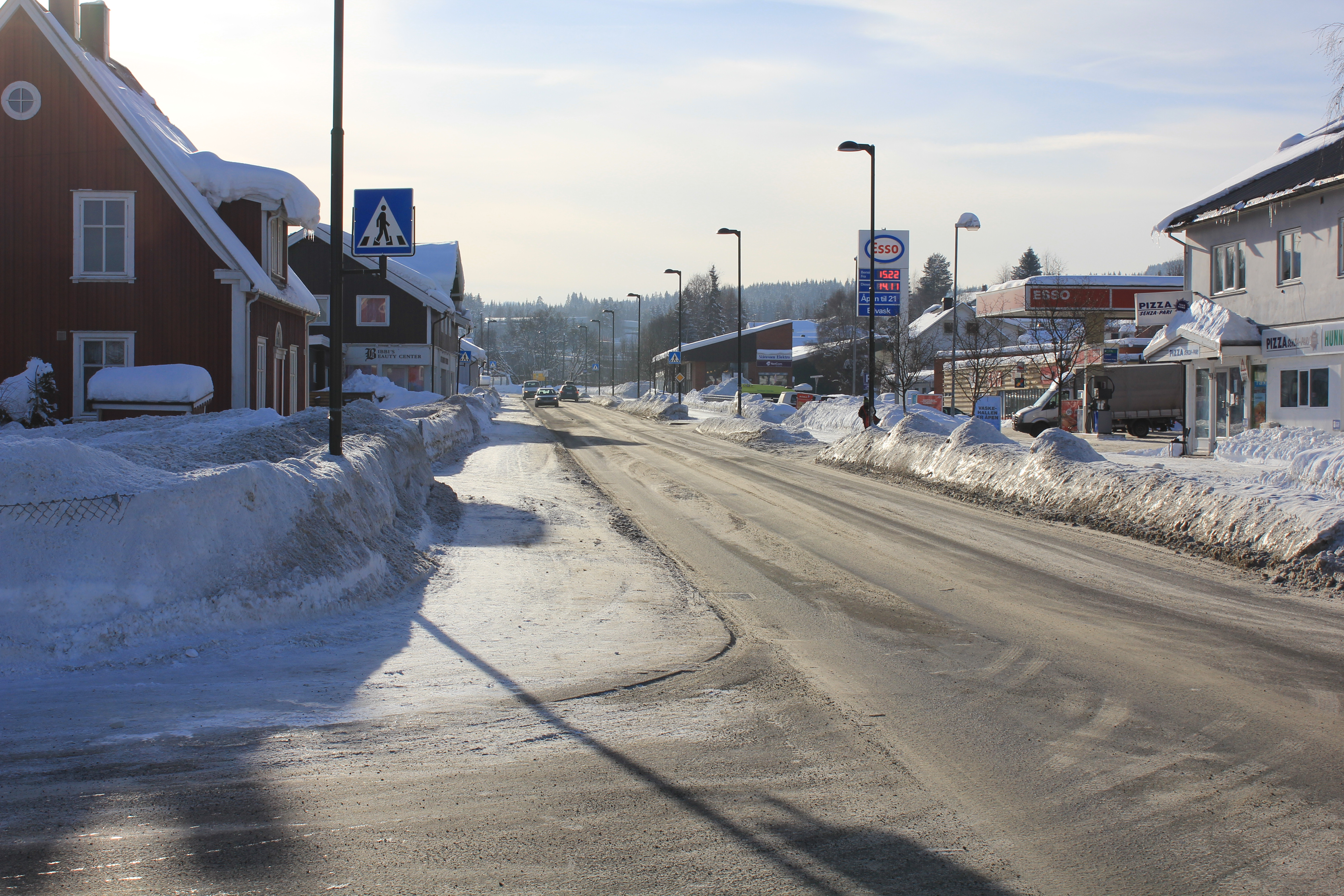
- Interactive map of Hunndalen
- Coordinates: 60°47′11″N 10°38′28″E
- Country: Norway
- City: Gjøvik
- Time zone: UTC+1 (CET)
  - Summer (DST): UTC+2 (CEST)
- ISO 3166 code: NO-120108

Hunndalen is a commercial and residential area of Gjøvik Municipality, Innlandet (formerly Oppland) County. The area is considered to be one of districts of Gjøvik and is approximately three kilometers west of downtown Gjøvik.

== History ==
Hunndalen is one of the oldest industrial sites in the former Oppland County. The nerve of Hunndalen was then Toten pulp Mill (closed down in 1981). The company O. Mustad & Søn AS (manufacturer of fish hooks and hardware equipment) are still active in the area for a number of redundancies. Mustad old industrial area has recently been revitalized with a number of new enterprises – and stands today as Mustad Business Park located on the border between Hunndalen district and center of Gjøvik. The old and picturesque brick buildings along Hunnselva houses per 2012 a number of new enterprises, such as Telenor customer service and various local contractors.

== Church ==
Hunn congregation includes Hunndalen and large parts of Nordbyen. Ward church is located on the border between the two districts, and collected in the new Hunn Church with address Åsveien 35.

== Schools, kindergartens and leisure ==
In the town are two schools, Blomhaug primary school with nearly 400 pupils and Vardal middle school. Hunndalen also has a number of kindergartens including Huskestua, Marka and Misjonshuset.

The leisure club "meeting place" that is open on Wednesdays is popular among the district's young people. There is also a mini-pitch on Vardal field, some soccer fields and a playground located along Hunnselva in what is now called Elveparken.

== Businesses and companies ==
The settlement of those who want to look for car, is called Hunndalen Car Town. Three major grocery stores are also in the district, in addition to the Lekeland and the new shopping center in Kallerud Trade Park.

== Notable people ==
- Ole Evinrude, entrepreneur
- Ingvild Flugstad Østberg, cross country skier
- Jan Erik Larssen, presenter in Broom, earlier Autofil
- Viggo Sandvik, former lead singer of Vazelina Bilopphøggers
- Bent Tomtum, former Norwegian champion in ski jumping.
- Anders M. Tangen, radio personality, standup comedian, lecturer, etc.
- Håkon Paulsberg, folk singers
