= Sakamoto Hiromichi =

Japanese composer and cellist (born 1962)

Hiromichi Sakamoto
- Origin: Japan
- Genres: Avant-garde; Japanoise; jazz
- Occupations: Musician; composer
- Instrument: Cello

Hiromichi Sakamoto (born 1962) is a Japanese avant-garde composer and cellist in the Japanoise and jazz art scene. Along with the cello, he uses voices and musical saws in his work. He is also known for playing the cello with various objects, like drill machines, grinding machines, and adult vibrators.

He has collaborated with musicians including Haco, Catherine Jauniaux, Lars Hollmer, and Level & Tyson.

Hiromichi was featured in the 2009 documentary We Don't Care About Music Anyway.
