= Set the House on Fire =

Studio album by Moddi
- Released: 8 March 2013
- Recorded: 2011–12
- Studio: Ocean Sound
- Genre: Folk
- Label: Propeller Recordings
- Producer: Hasse Rosbach

Moddi chronology
Floriography (2010)	Set the House on Fire (2013)	Kæm va du? (2013)

Singles from Set the House on Fire
- 1. "House By the Sea" Released: 11 January 2013; 2. "Run to the Water" Released: 1 March 2013; 3. "Silhouette" Released: 20 March 2015

Set the House on Fire is the second studio album released by Norwegian musician Moddi. The album released on 8 March 2013 through Propeller Recordings in Norway. The album peaked at No. 10 on the Norwegian Albums Charts. The album includes the single "House By the Sea" and "Run to the Water".

== Singles ==
"House By the Sea" was released as the lead single from the album on 11 January 2013. "Run to the Water" was released as the second single from the album on 1 March 2013. "Silhouette" was released as the third single from the album on 20 March 2015.

== Track listing ==
No.	Title	Length
1.	"Heim"	1:19
2.	"House By the Sea"	3:38
3.	"Let the Spider Run Alive"	5:10
4.	"Soon You'll Be Somebody Else"	4:14
5.	"For an Unborn"	7:27
6.	"The Architect"	5:56
7.	"Run to the Water"	3:38
8.	"Silhouette"	4:02
9.	"One Minute More"	7:25
10.	"Heim Igjen"	1:33
11.	"Northern Line"	4:36

== Chart performance ==
=== Weekly charts ===
Chart (2013)	Peak position
Norwegian Albums (VG-lista)	10

== Release history ==
Region	Release date	Format	Label
Norway	8 March 2013	Digital download; CD	Propeller Recordings
