= Thom Hell =

Norwegian singer-songwriter (born 1976)

Thom Hell (born 19 March 1976) is a Norwegian singer-songwriter. His birth name is Thomas Helland. He has released several EPs, albums, and singles. After using his backing band "The Love Connection" (Bjarte Jørgensen, Frank Hammersland, Marte Wulff, Jørn Raknes and Vidar Ersfjord) on the two first albums and the following tours, he then formed a new backing band consisting of different people from the Norwegian music scene (Even Ormestad, Thomas Aslaksen, Kjetil Grande, Asbjørn Ribe)

Hell also contributes on Norwegian singer-songwriter Marit Larsen's album Under the Surface where he joins Larsen in a duet for the song "To an End".

== Biography ==
Thom released 2 EPs and 2 albums before being asked by Marit Larsen to be in her band. He also contributed to her first solo album. After leaving her band, he went on to release his critically acclaimed album "God If I Saw Her Now", for which he received two Norwegian Grammys. His next album "All Good Things" went on to win another one for best male artist of the year. Went to LA to record "Suddenly Past" in 2012. It was produced by the talented Jason Falkner. Recorded and released "Six" in 2014, and "Until This Blows Over" on the Voices of Wonder label in 2015.

Thom is continues to work on his own albums, while producing other artists in his spare time.

== Discography ==
=== Albums ===
Year	Album	Peak positions
Year	Album	NOR
2004	I Love You	31
2006	Every Little Piece	22
2008	God If I Saw Her Now	5
2010	All Good Things	5
2012	Suddenly Past	18
2013	The Sound of Ocean Sound, with Larkin Poe	
2014	Six	17
2015	Until This Blows Over	
2016	Happy Rabbit	
2019	Straight to VHS	
2020	Christmas Songs	
2022	Today is Tomorrow	TBD

Compilation albums

Year	Album	Peak positions
Year	Album	NOR
2011	This Is Thom Hell	18

=== EPs ===
- 2003: "Tremendous Sinner" (EP)
- 2004: The While Your Waiting (EP)
- 2004: I Love You Too (bonus EP to a limited edition of the I Love You album)

=== Singles ===
- 2003: "Missing Home"
- 2004: "Mourning Song"
- 2004: "Some Guy"
- 2006: "Try"
- 2008: "Don´t Let Go"
- 2008: "Darling"
- 2008: "Don´t Leave Me Heather"
- 2010: "Over You"
- 2010: "All Good Things"
- 2011: "Tonight"
- 2012: "As Long As"
- 2012: "She´s Like The Wind"
- 2015: Time
- 2015: Everything Is Happening So Fast
- 2016: 1985
- 2016: Leave Me To Die
- 2016: Famous
