= Floriography (album) =

Studio album by Moddi
- Released: 8 February 2010
- Recorded: 2008–09
- Genre: Folk
- Label: Propeller Recordings

Moddi chronology
Floriography (2010)	Set the House on Fire (2013)

Singles from Floriography
- 1. "Ardennes" Released: 21 February 2011; 2. "Smoke" Released: 12 December 2011

Floriography is the debut studio album released by Norwegian musician Moddi. The album was released on 8 February 2010 through Propeller Recordings in Norway. The album peaked at number nine on the Norwegian Albums Charts. The album includes the single "Ardennes" and "Smoke".

== Singles ==
A Kontaktor remix of "Ardennes" was released as the lead single from the album 21 February 2011. "Smoke" was released as the second single from the album 12 December 2011.

== Track listing ==
No.	Title	Length
1.	"Rubbles"	6:05
2.	"Magpie Eggs"	5:25
3.	"Ardennes"	4:18
4.	"A Sense of Grey"	4:40
5.	"Smoke"	5:12
6.	"Poetry"	6:42
7.	"Stuck in the Waltz"	5:13
8.	"7!"	7:25
9.	"Krokstav-Emne"	3:10

== Chart performance ==
=== Weekly charts ===
Chart (2010)	Peak position
Norwegian Albums (VG-lista)	9

== Release history ==
Region	Release date	Format	Label
Norway	8 February 2010	Digital download; CD	Propeller Recordings
