= If a Song Could Get Me You (song) =

Single by Marit Larsen

from the album If a Song Could Get Me You / The Chase
- B-side: "Addicted" (international version), "Fences" (international version)
- Released: 18 August 2008
- Length: 3:28
- Label: Columbia SevenOne
- Composers: Marit Larsen, Kåre Christoffer Vestrheim
- Lyricist: Marit Larsen
- Producer: Kåre Christoffer Vestrheim

Marit Larsen singles chronology
"Solid Ground" (2007)	"If a Song Could Get Me You" (2008)	"I've Heard Your Love Songs" (2008)

Marit Larsen international singles chronology
"If a Song Could Get Me You" (2009)	"Under the Surface" (2010)

"If a Song Could Get Me You" is a single by Norwegian singer-songwriter Marit Larsen. It served as Larsen's first international single and reached No. 1 in Norway, Austria, and Germany.

== Lyrical content ==
The song deals with a broken relationship. The singer would do everything and try every song to get her boyfriend back.

== Chart performance ==
In Norway, the single entered the chart at No. 1 and stayed there for two consecutive weeks. In Germany it entered at No. 15, rose to No. 3 the next week and in the third week it was No. 1. It stayed there for five consecutive weeks. The song charted at No. 32 in its first week in Austria and in the fourth week, it became No. 1. After one week, it was beaten by "I Gotta Feeling" by the Black Eyed Peas. It then returned to its peak position and held it for three more weeks. In Switzerland, it held the No. 2 spot for one week, beaten by "I Gotta Feeling".

== Charts ==
=== Weekly charts ===
Chart (2008–2009)	Peak position
Austria (Ö3 Austria Top 40)	1
Europe (Eurochart Hot 100)	5
Germany (GfK)	1
Hungary (Editors' Choice Top 40)	24
Iceland (Tonlist)	19
Norway (VG-lista)	1
Switzerland (Schweizer Hitparade)	2

=== Year-end charts ===
Chart (2009)	Position
Austria (Ö3 Austria Top 40)	6
Europe (Eurochart Hot 100)	30
Germany (Media Control GfK)	11
Switzerland (Schweizer Hitparade)	19

=== Decade-end charts ===
Chart (2000–2009)	Position
Germany (Media Control GfK)	49

== Certifications ==
Region	Certification	Certified units/sales
Austria (IFPI Austria)	Gold	15,000^{*}
Germany (BVMI)	Platinum	300,000^{^}
Switzerland (IFPI Switzerland)	Platinum	30,000^{^}
^{*} Sales figures based on certification alone.^{^} Shipments figures based on certification alone.
