= Kæm va du? =

Studio album by Moddi
- Released: 11 October 2013
- Recorded: 2011–12
- Studio: Albatross Recorders, Oslo
- Genre: Folk
- Label: Propeller Recordings
- Producer: Hasse Rosbach

Moddi chronology
Set the House on Fire (2013)	Kæm va du? (2013)	Unsongs (2016)

Singles from Kæm va du?
- 1. "Grønt Lauv I Snyen" Released: 16 July 2013; 2. "En Sang Om Fly" Released: 20 September 2013

Kæm va du? is the third studio album released by Norwegian musician Moddi. The album was released on 11 October 2013 through Propeller Recordings in Norway. The album peaked at number five on the Norwegian Albums Charts. The album includes the single "Grønt Lauv I Snyen" and "En Sang Om Fly".

== Singles ==
"Grønt Lauv I Snyen" was released as the lead single from the album on 16 July 2013. "En Sang Om Fly" was released as the second single from the album on 20 September 2013.

== Track listing ==
No.	Title	Length
1.	"Mannen i Ausa"	4:18
2.	"Blå Kveill"	3:35
3.	"Togsang"	2:59
4.	"Vi Slakta Sau"	1:20
5.	"Noens Ark"	3:30
6.	"Grønt Lauv I Snyen"	2:15
7.	"Kjerkegård Ved Havet"	7:31
8.	"Krokstav-Emne"	3:08
9.	"En Sang Om Fly"	3:03

== Chart performance ==
=== Weekly charts ===
Chart (2013)	Peak position
Norwegian Albums (VG-lista)	5

== Release history ==
Region	Release date	Format	Label
Norway	11 October 2013	Digital download; CD	Propeller Recordings
