= Spark (Marit Larsen album) =

Studio album by Marit Larsen
- Released: 18 November 2011
- Recorded: August/September 2011
- Genre: Pop, folk
- Length: 43:53
- Label: EMI
- Producer: Kåre Christoffer Vestrheim

Marit Larsen chronology
If a Song Could Get Me You (2009)	Spark (2011)	When the Morning Comes (2014)

Singles from Spark
- 1. "Coming Home" Released: 14 October 2011; 2. "Don't Move" Released: 30 January 2012

Professional ratings
Review scores
Source	Rating
Bergens Tidende	4/6 stars
Dagbladet	5/6 stars
GAFFA.dk	4/6 stars
NRK Lydverket	4/6 stars
Verdens Gang	4/6 stars
Rolling Stone (Germany)	1.5/5 stars

Spark is the third album from Norwegian singer-songwriter Marit Larsen, and was released on 18 November 2011. The information was made available via Marit Larsen's Tumblr page. On 31 July 2011 Marit Larsen began to post information about her third album on her Tumblr. On 7 October 2011 she announced the name of the album and track list. The first single, "Coming Home" had premiered on NRK P3 and on her Facebook page on 15 October. The album produced two singles; "Coming Home" and "Don't Move". The album spawned 2 number one songs in the Philippine Top 100 Songs Chart where in "Coming Home" stayed atop for 4 consecutive weeks, which gave Marit her first number one song in the Philippines as a solo artist and her non-single song "Last Night" stayed for 2 consecutive weeks in the early 2012, serving as her second number one song.

== Track listing ==
No.	Title	Writer(s)	Length
1.	"Keeper of the Keys"	Marit Larsen	04:01
2.	"Don't Move"	Larsen, Peter Zizzo	03:45
3.	"What If"	Larsen	04:57
4.	"I Can't Love You Anymore"	Larsen, Teitur Lassen	04:21
5.	"Coming Home"	Larsen	03:59
6.	"Me and the Highway"	Larsen	05:01
7.	"Last Night"	Larsen	04:20
8.	"Have You Ever"	Larsen, Zizzo	04:04
9.	"Fine Line"	Larsen	04:25
10.	"That Day"	Larsen	04:45
Total length:			43:53

== Chart ==
Chart (2011–2012)	Peak position
Norwegian Albums Chart	2
Swiss Albums Chart	36
German Albums Chart	57

== Singles ==
Year	Single	Norwegian Singles Chart	Norwegian Radio Chart	German Singles Chart	Philippines Top 100 Songs
2011	"Vår Beste Dag"	1	1	–	
2011	"Coming Home"	18	5	75	1
2012	"Don't Move"	–	–	–	–
2012	"Last Night"	–	–	–	1

== Technical credits ==
- Marit Larsen – Vocals, arranger, Piano, Mandolin, Acoustic Guitar, Electric Guitar, Glockenspiel, Zither, Harmonica, Celeste, Hand Claps, Church Organ.
- Kåre Christoffer Vestrheim – Producer, arranger, Piano, Harpsichord, Celeste, Cowbell, Hand Claps, Accordion, Electric Guitar.
- Geir Sundstøl – Acoustic Guitar, Lap Steel Guitar, Mandolin, Harmonica, Harp.
- Tor Egil Kreken – Bass, Electric Guitar, Acoustic Guitar
- Torstein Lofthus – Drums
- Michael Scott Hartung – Recording engineers, Acoustic Guitar, Mixed.
- Tommy Kristiansen – Acoustic Guitar
- Hans Andreas Horntveth Jansen – Assistant recording engineers
- Kristoffer Bonsaksen – Assistant recording engineers
- Artwork – Erland G. Banggren
- Photography – Jørgen Gomnæs

== Certifications ==
Country	Certifications	Sales/Shipments
Norway	Gold	25,000+

== Trivia ==
In her Tumblr page, Marit Larsen talked about a track entitled "Blue Print", but it didn't make the final track list.
