= Moddi =

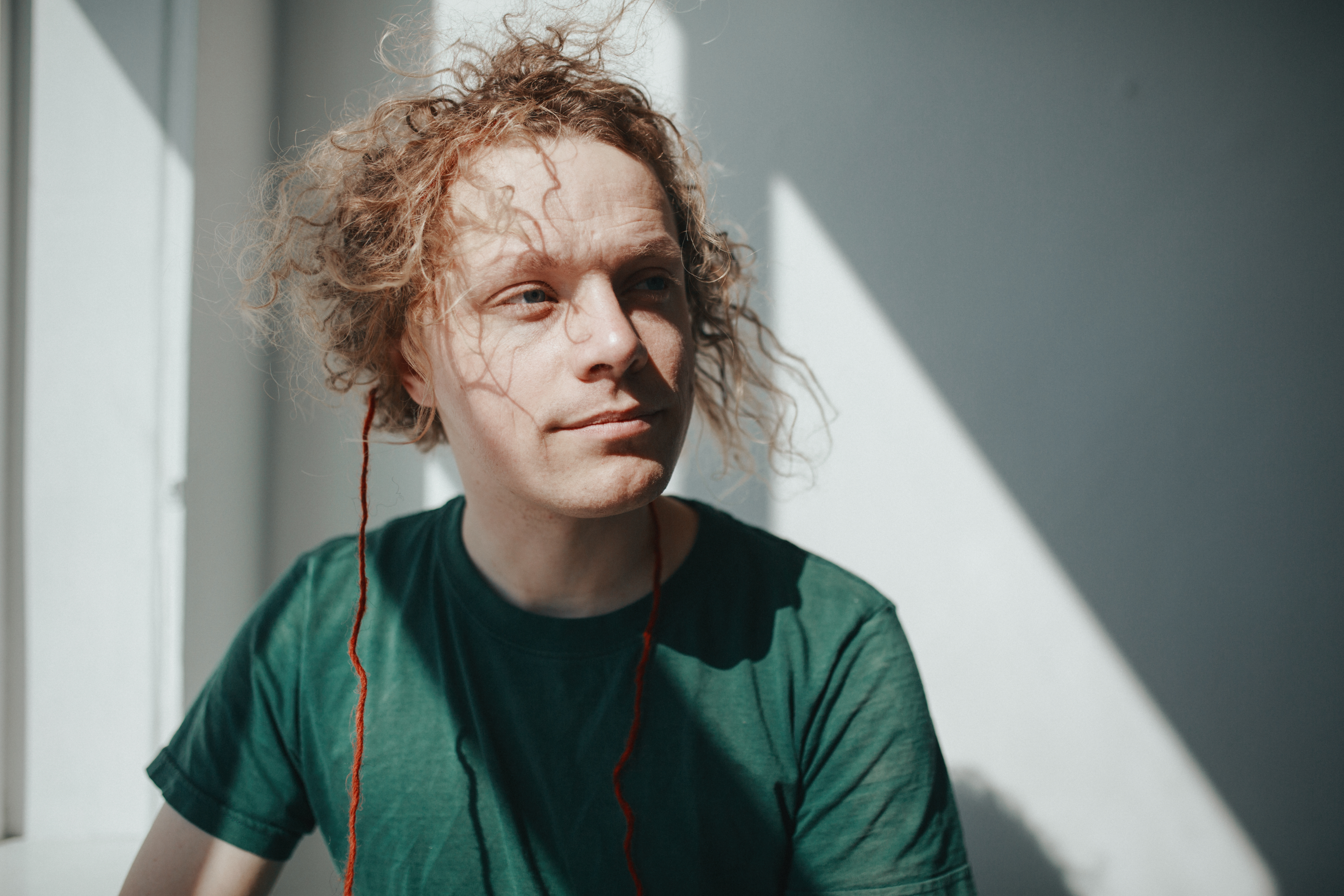
- Moddi

Background information
- Born: 18 February 1987 (age 39)
- Origin: Senja, Troms, Norway
- Genre: Folk
- Years active: 2005–present
- Label: Propeller Recordings
- Website: moddi.no

Pål Moddi Lue (previously Pål Moddi Knutsen) (born 18 February 1987 in Senja), known by the artist name Moddi, is a Norwegian musician, author and activist, whose contemporary folk music often includes songs of protest or social justice.

== Background ==
Pål Lue grew up on the island of Senja in Northern Norway. As a child, he showed a particular concern for the environment, an interest which would come to shape his musical direction in the years to come. During high school, Lue was leading the local chapter of the environmentalist group Nature and Youth. "My first songs were an attempt to give a voice to the voiceless nature", he later explained about his motivation to create music.

== Musical career ==
The first release under the name of Moddi was recorded in 2007 and distributed in 20 home-made copies. Later followed the debut album Floriography, recorded with producer Valgeir Sigurðsson in Iceland and containing songs from Lue's period in Nature and Youth. Q magazine described the album as "irrevocably heart-warming and beautifully constructed piece of melancholic folk-pop". On his second album, Moddi presented the single "House By The Sea", his best known composition to date.

The same year saw the release of Kæm va du? ("Who were you?"), with lyrics borrowed from the Northern Norwegian poets such as Arvid Hanssen, Helge Stangnes and Ola Bremnes. The album also included the single "Togsang", a reinterpretation of Vashti Bunyans 60s cult hit "Train Song". Bunyan later commented that Moddi's was her favourite cover version of any of her songs. Kæm va du? won the Spellemannprisen award for "Folk Album of the Year".

In 2016, Moddi released his fourth studio album, "Unsongs", consisting of Moddi's reinterpretations and translations of banned and censored songs from 12 different countries. Among the artists included on the album were Pussy Riot (Russia), Izhar Ashdot (Israel), Mari Boine (Norway/Sápmi), Liu Xiaobo (China) and Kate Bush (UK). Following the release, Moddi published the book "Forbudte sanger" (Forbidden songs) where he described a number of attempts to hold back the songs on the album, among others by Russian and Lebanese authorities, and by the British public broadcaster BBC.

In 2019, Moddi released his fifth studio album "Like in 1968", inspired by the events that occurred in 1968.

== Activism ==
Moddi is known for bringing his strong political commitment into his music. In January 2010 Moddi refused nomination for the €100 000 Statoil grant on environmental grounds, commenting that a nomination would not be compatible with his environmental engagement. In 2014 Moddi announced that he would be cancelling his scheduled concert in Tel Aviv, Israel, on the grounds that he would not be taken to support the Israeli expansion of settlements in the West Bank. He did not officially endorse any organised appeal, stating that "the debate is already way too black and white".

When Moddi released his version of the Pussy Riot song Punk Prayer in 2016, he did so by recording a music video on the doorstep of the King Oscar II Chapel, marking the Northern border between Norway and Russia. On his concert in Kirkenes the same year, Moddi was pressured into dropping the same song after indirect pressure from Russian diplomats.

== Education ==
Pål Moddi Lue has a master's degree from the Centre for Development and the Environment (SUM) at the University of Oslo. In his master thesis "Visions through the smelting furnace", he studied the Norwegian smelting plant Finnfjord in their course towards a carbon-neutral ferrosilicon production process.

== Discography ==
=== Studio albums ===
Title	Produced by	Details	Peak chart positions
Title	Produced by	Details	NOR
Floriography	Valgeir Sigurðsson	Released: 8 February 2010; Label: Impeller; Formats: Digital download, CD	9
Set the House on Fire	Hasse Rosbach	Released: 8 March 2013; Label: Propeller; Formats: Digital download, CD	10
Kæm va du?	Hasse Rosbach	Released: 11 October 2013; Label: Propeller; Formats: Digital download, CD	5
Unsongs	Hasse Rosbach	Released: 16 September 2016; Label: Propeller; Formats: Digital download, CD	8
Like in 1968	Hasse Rosbach	Released: 13 September 2019; Label: Propeller; Formats: Digital download, CD	—
Bråtebrann		Released: 10 June 2022; Label: Propeller; Formats: LP, Digital download	—

=== Extended plays ===
Title	Details
Random Skywriting	Released: 2007; Label: Self-released; Formats: Digital download
Rubato (Split LP with Einar Stray)	Released: 2008; Label: Playground, Spoon Train Audio; Formats: Digital download
Rubbles	Released: 15 October 2010; Label: Propeller; Formats: Digital download
Music for Frankenstein	Released: 12 March 2015; Label: Nordland teater; Formats: Digital download

=== Live albums ===
Title	Details
Live Parkteateret	Released: 2009; Label: Self-released; Formats: Digital download
Live at Jakob Church of Culture	Released: 22 September 2014; Label: Propeller; Formats: Digital download

=== Singles ===
Year	Title	Album
2009	"Nordnorsk julesalme"	Non-album single
2011	"Ardennes"	Floriography
2011	"Thimbleweed"	Non-album single
2011	"Smoke"	Floriography
2013	"House by the Sea"	Set the House on Fire
2013	"Run to the Water"	Set the House on Fire
2013	"Grønt Lauv I Snyen"	Kæm va du?
2013	"En Sang Om Fly"	Kæm va du?
2014	"Sola"	Non-album singles
2014	"Train Song"	Non-album singles
2014	"Eli Geva"	Unsongs
2015	"Silhouette"	Set the House on Fire
2016	"Punk Prayer"	Unsongs
2016	"Army Dreamers"	Unsongs
2016	"A Matter of Habit"	Unsongs
2019	"Little By Little"	Like in 1968
2019	"Kriegspiel"	Like in 1968
2019	"New Dawn"	Like in 1968
2020	"Haus am Meer"	Non-album singles

=== Other appearances ===
Year	Artist	Album	Notes
2009	Kråkesølv	Trådnøsting	Accordion
2011	Einar Stray	Chiaroscuro	Vocals
2011	Synne Sanden	When Nobody's Around	Vocals
2011	Thomas Dybdahl	Før morgengry	Accordion
2019	På Stengrunn	Underveis	Vocals
2019	På Stengrunn	På Gjensyn	Accordion

=== Other releases ===
- 2010 – Hjertestups withTogsang (Tyrili)
- 2010 – Samleplate for oljefritt Lofoten, Vesterålen og Senja with the song Krokstav-emne
- 2011 – Vi tenner våre lykter with the song Nordnorsk julesalme
- 2012 – Norge, mitt Norge..? with the songs Det stig av hav eit oljeland and Deilig er Norden
- 2015 – Fabler om en åpen folkekirke with the song Vær hilset, fru Bjerkås!
