= Oratorium (Funeral album) =

Studio album by Funeral
- Released: 23 November 2012
- Recorded: 2011
- Genre: Gothic doom
- Length: 72:26 (standard edition); 91:59 (with bonus disc)
- Label: Grau Records
- Producer: Simen Hogdal Pedersen, Anders Eek

Funeral chronology
To Mourn is a Virtue (2011)	Oratorium (2012)	Praesentialis in Aeternum (2021)

Oratorium is the sixth album by Norwegian gothic doom metal band Funeral. It is the first album not to include longtime singer Frode Forsmo, and the first to feature In Vain vocalist Sindre Nedland.

The album was rated 4 out of 5 stars by Metal Hammer.

== Track listing ==
All tracks are written by Anders Eek, Sindre Nedland & Einar Fredriksen.

No.	Title	Length
1.	"Burning With Regret"	11:05
2.	"Hate"	10:45
3.	"Break Me"	13:17
4.	"Song of the Knell"	7:28
5.	"From the Orchestral Grave"	10:41
6.	"Making the World My Tomb"	8:04
7.	"Will You Have Me?"	11:06
Total length:		01:12:26

Bonus disc
No.	Title	Length
8.	"So Now Scorn Leads the Vessel"	5:40
9.	"Need"	7:23
10.	"Eg ser"	6:32
Total length:		01:31:59

== Credits ==
=== Band members ===
- Anders Eek – Drums, Guitars, Backing vocals
- Sindre Nedland (In Vain) – Lead vocals
- Rune Gandrud – Bass guitar
- Erlend E. Nybø – Guitars
- Mats Lerberg – Guitars, Vocals

=== Production ===
- Anders Eek – Producer
- Simen Hogdal Pedersen – Producer
- Øyvind Voldmo Larsen – Mixing
- Simen Andreassen – Mastering
- Erlend E. Nybo – Cover art
- Magnus Steenhoff – Photography
