= Ida Jenshus =

Norwegian musician (born 1987)

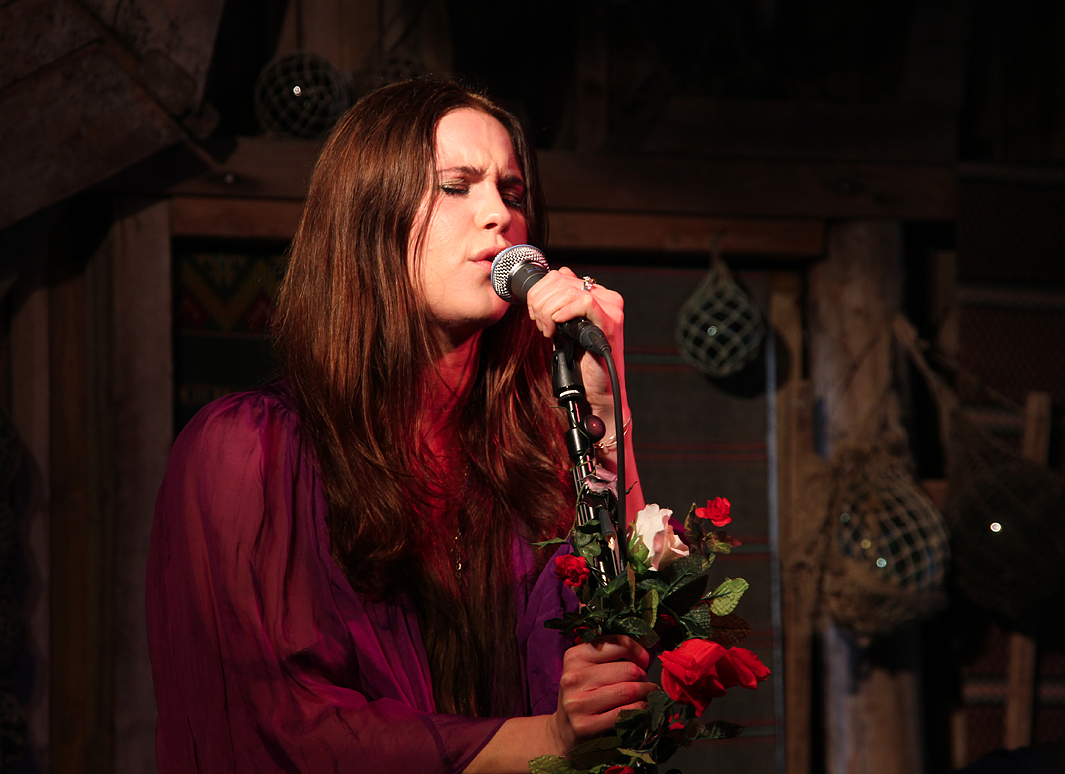

Background information
- Born: Ida Gjølga Jenshus; April 25, 1987 (age 38); Steinkjer Municipality, Norway
- Genres: Country; Acoustic
- Occupations: Singer performer songwriter composer
- Instruments: Vocals guitar harmonica
- Years active: 2008–present
- Labels: Universal Music, Mercury Music
- Website: idajenshus.com

Ida Gjølga Jenshus (born April 25, 1987) is a country artist from Steinkjer Municipality in Norway.

After winning a talent competition in 2007, she recorded her first studio album in early 2008 at the studio of record producers Lars Lien and Håkon Gebhardt.

The singles "These are the days" and "For the Nation" were released prior to the release of the album Color of the Sun, which was released on October 13, 2008. She won the Norwegian Spellemann Award 2008 for best country album.

In 2010, she released her second album No Guarantees, which won the Spellemann Award 2010 in the country category.

She released her third studio album in October 2012 in Norway.

== Ida Jenshus Band ==
- Ida Jenshus – vocals and guitars
- Alexander Pettersen – guitar, mandolin, harmonica and vocals
- Håkon Gebhardt – banjo and guitar
- Stian Lundberg – drums
- Kjell "KK" Karlsen – pedal steel
- Aleksander Gifstad – bass

== Discography ==
=== Albums ===
Year	Album	Peak positions	Certification
Year	Album	NOR	Certification
2008	Color of the Sun	14	
2010	No Guarantees	3	
2012	Someone To Love	3	
2014	Let It Go EP		
2015	Starting Over Again		
2017	Two Worlds		
2019	From This Day On		

=== Singles ===
- These Are the Days (2008)
- For The Nation (2008)
- Better Day (2010)
- I Waited (2010)
- Someone to Love (2012)
- Marie (What Happened to the Music?) (2012)
- Days of Nothing (2013)
- Ego in a Bag (2014), with Sugarfoot
- Shallow River (2014)
- Hero (2014)
- My Last Goodbye (2015)
- Changes (2015)
- In Your Arms (2017)
- Love You A Little Less (2018)
- Over Before It Strandet (2019)
- That Morning (2019)
- Fin dag (2021) with Rasmus Rohde
- Heim igjen (2020)

== TV Filmography ==
- Lyden av Lørdag (2007)
- Sommerspillet (2010)
- Sommeråpent (2012)

== Equipment ==
- Gretsch White Falcon
- Harmony Sovereign
