= Only a Fool =

Single by Marit Larsen

from the album Under the Surface
- Released: 2006
- Recorded: 2005
- Genre: Pop
- Length: 4:06
- Label: EMI
- Songwriter(s): Marit Larsen
- Producer(s): Kåre Vestrheim

Marit Larsen singles chronology
"Under the Surface" (2006)	"Only a Fool" (2006)	"Solid Ground" (2007)

"Only a Fool" is the third single by Norwegian pop singer Marit Larsen, released from her debut album Under the Surface. The single spent only two weeks on the Norwegian Singles Chart and was only a radio release. It can only be purchased online as a single, as no hard copy is sold in stores.

== Charts ==
Chart (2006–2010)	Peak position
Norwegian Singles Chart	14
Norwegian Radio Chart	3
Luxembourg Singles Chart	4
Swedish Singles Chart	6
