= Håkon Paulsberg =

Norwegian musician and singer-songwriter

- Born: 26 July 1952 (age 74); Hunndalen, Oppland
- Origin: Norway
- Genres: Folk, pop
- Occupations: Musician, singer-songwriter
- Instruments: Vocals, guitar & drums
- Website: Official website

Håkon Paulsberg (born 26 July 1952 in Hunndalen, Norway) is a Norwegian musician and singer-songwriter, the father of the jazz saxophonist Hanna Paulsberg, now living in Rygge, Østfold. He is known for collaborations with other creatives such as Jan Erik Vold, Arne Domnerus and Clifford Jordan, and composing music to lyrics by poets such as Georg Johannesen.

== Career ==
Paulsberg has extensive experience as a drummer in a variety of styles, and has a long career as a musician. Since 1980, he has been active in various bands, but has also collaborated with international jazz performers such as Arne Domnerus and Clifford Jordan. At the end of the 1990s, Paulsberg switched from drumming to being a guitarist and singer-songwriter with the album Jinter (1999), in which he interprets the lyrics of Alf Prøysen. This has led to collaborations such as that with the poet Jan Erik Vold. Today Paulsberg is developing his own style and are working to make music to poems by various writers, such as Georg Johannesen.

== Discography ==
=== Solo albums ===
- 1999: Jinter (Gramofon), with lyrics by Alf Prøysen
- 2006: Kong J (Gramofon), with lyrics by Georg Johannesen

=== Collaborations ===
With Pastor Wang Quintet

- 2004: Pastorale (Wango)
