= Featherbrain =

Studio album by Hanne Hukkelberg
- Released: 20 February 2012 (UK); 6 March 2012 (USA)
- Genre: Alternative rock, indie rock
- Label: Propeller Recordings

Hanne Hukkelberg chronology
| Blood from a Stone (2009) | Featherbrain (2012) |

Featherbrain is the fourth studio album by Norwegian singer-songwriter Hanne Hukkelberg released 20 February 2012 in the United Kingdom and 6 March 2012 in the United States on Norway's Propeller Recordings.

== Track listing ==
All songs composed by Hanne Hukkelberg.

1. "Featherbrain" – 4:35
2. "Noah" – 4:30
3. "I Sing You" – 3:04
4. "The Bigger Me" – 2:48
5. "My Devils" 4:02
6. "Too Good to Be Good" – 7:52
7. "SMS" – 1:13
8. "The Time and I and What We Make" – 4:29
9. "You Gonna" – 3:47
10. "Erik" – 4:17

== Critical reception ==
Professional ratings
Aggregate scores
| Source | Rating |
|---|---|
| Metacritic | 78 |
Review scores
| Source | Rating |
| Drowned in Sound | 8/10 |
| BBC Music | highly positive |
| MusicOMH | 3.5/5 stars |

The album received positive reviews. On the Metacritic aggregate listing of 9 reviews, the album scored 78, which indicates "generally favorable reviews". James Atherton writing for Drowned in Sound concluded his 8/10 review with: "Whilst Hanne’s music has evolved since her debut Little Things in 2004, Featherbrain is an album that pulls various strands of that development together to make something new. Unlike the recent offering from the Nordic’s most famous musical export there is no technical wizardry at work here, no apps and no iPads, just heartfelt song-writing grounded in honesty and intimacy. And that voice." Luke Slater reviewing for BBC Music wrote: "As well as the fundamental strength of composition – it is not that structurally strange – what must also go down as a huge part of Featherbrain’s appeal and boldness is the instrumentation. The influence of experimental jazz works its way through to the fore and the way in which these unusual sounds tap, pierce and slice through the music creates an often unsettling and unpredictable ambience. They do sometimes jar, but for the most part they complete the structural foundations."
