= Hanne Hukkelberg =

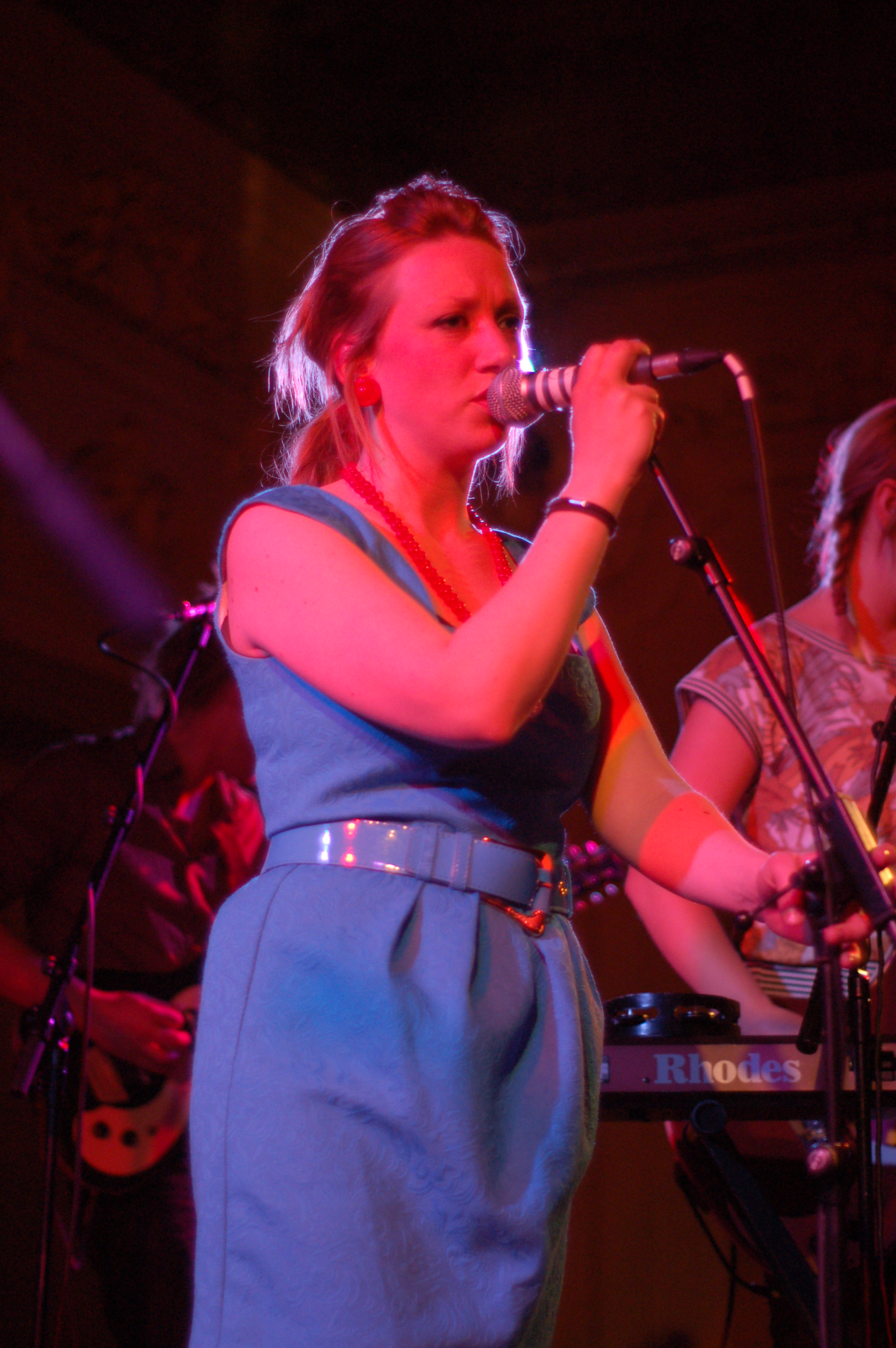
- Hanne Hukkelberg at Bush Hall 2

Background information
- Origin: Kongsberg, Norway
- Genres: Pop, art rock, indie, experimental
- Occupation: Singer-songwriter
- Years active: 2003–present
- Label: Hukkelberg Music
- Website: www.hannehukkelberg.com

Hanne Hukkelberg (born 17 April 1979) is a Norwegian singer-songwriter and producer from Kongsberg, Norway.

Hukkelberg started singing and playing instruments at the age of 3. In her youth, she was a vocalist covering genres such as jazz, rock, and free jazz, and was also a member of the influential doom metal band Funeral in high school, in which she contributed vocals on their second album, In Fields of Pestilent Grief. She earned her degree from the Norwegian Academy of Music in Oslo.

Hukkelberg graduated from the Norwegian Academy of Music in 2003, establishing herself as a vocalist, composer and multi-instrumentalist. It was there she met Kåre Chr. Vestrheim – a tutor who would later become one of Hukkelberg's closest friends and collaborators; also producing her Cast Anchor EP (2003) and breakthrough debut LP Little Things (2004).

In 2006 Hukkelberg released her second album Rykestrasse 68. The album was awarded a Norwegian Grammy in 2007 and released to international acclaim, with the likes of Pitchfork, The Guardian and BBC leading press plaudits.

After extensive touring – including a series of UK/EU/US headlines, a full European run with Wilco, and a special guest performance with José González at New York's Bowery Ballroom – Hukkelberg released Blood From A Stone (2009). It generated steadfast press support and industry interest, including KCRW’s Chris Douridas and film director Andrew Adamson, who commissioned Hukkelberg for an original composition on The Chronicles of Narnia: Prince Caspian soundtrack.

After relocating to New York City Hukkelberg released fourth album Featherbrain to similar acclaim in 2012. The album was hailed a "masterpiece" (The Sunday Times), with Hukkelberg's brazen confidence and steadfast individuality reaching "airtight, impeccable" standards (The Quietus). The corresponding album tour – yet another trans-Atlantic affair, including repeat-dates with Wilco – was followed by an extended live hiatus.

In 2014 Hukkelberg temporarily returned to the studio to pursue a series of commissioned works – including a guest collab with Todd Terje and Bryan Ferry on Johnny and Mary.

Hukkelberg's fifth studio album – Trust – was released by Propeller Recordings 20 October 2017. Hukkelberg's newest album, Birthmark, was released on 16 August 2019.

== Little Things ==
Her debut album Little Things was released in Norway in 2004 with a subsequent worldwide release in June 2005 by Propeller Recordings in Norway and distributed by Sony Music in the United States. Little Things is notable for its eclectic array of instruments and its use of found sounds, such as bicycle spokes, dish brushes, wine glasses, and rain.

The album earned enthusiastic reviews as critics lauded Hukkelberg for her originality and vocal ability. "Hanne Hukkelberg has delivered the kind of debut that heralds the arrival of a major new talent," said PopMatters. The Observer called the album "subtle and moving." The Sunday Times listed Little Things among the Records of the Year for 2005.

== Rykestraße 68 ==
After the success of Little Things, Hukkelberg went to Berlin to compose songs for her next album.

Rykestraße 68 was released in September 2006, and reviewers noted the expansion and maturation of Hukkelberg's talents. The album contained a cover of "Break My Body" by The Pixies which became a staple of Hukkelberg's live shows. Rykestraße 68 won Hukkelberg an Open Class category Spellemannprisen, the Norwegian equivalent of a Grammy, in 2006.

Hukkelberg toured Europe extensively in support of Little Things and Rykestrasse 68, and her unconventional live shows featured her small combo playing assorted instruments and found objects. Often she would play a metal trash can lid with a drumstick; invariably there would be an upturned bicycle onstage so Hukkelberg could strum the spokes.

Hukkelberg contributed a song, "Lucy," to the soundtrack of the film The Chronicles of Narnia: Prince Caspian in 2008.

== Blood from a Stone ==
In 2009, Hukkelberg released Blood from a Stone. This album's guitar-heavy sound was a departure from the jazzy pop of her first two releases, recalling 80s alt-rock bands like The Pixies and Bettie Serveert as well as PJ Harvey. Although many reviews deplored the album's more straightforward approach, Pitchfork approved of the record as "a singer's album, highlighting Hukkelberg's voice above all else." The singer was nominated as a Female Artist for a Spellemannprisen in 2009 for Blood from a Stone. She also contributed vocals to Motorpsycho's 2009 album Heavy Metal Fruit.

In early 2010, Hukkelberg toured Europe opening for Wilco. With a regular band behind her, Hukkelberg's live sets began to de-emphasize the surreal performance-art aspect of her earlier shows and rely more on conventional rock band interplay.

Hukkelberg spent four months in New York City during 2010, playing solo gigs and composing material for her next album. Prior to her departure from New York in July, Hukkelberg made two brief trips to Norway to compete for an A-ha Talent Grant in June. She lost out to Shining, whose vocalist Jørgen Munkeby played reeds on Little Things.

In 2011, Hukkelberg contributed vocals to Huntsville's For Flowers, Cars and Merry Wars CD. She also sang backup for Norwegian band Heroes & Zeros, on the track "Wistful Hands" from their 2011 CD Ghostly Kisses.

== Featherbrain ==
Hukkelberg released Featherbrain, her fourth album, in February 2012. A less conventional-sounding record than the previous release, Featherbrain gained praise for returning Hukkelberg to her experimental aesthetic. "Hukkelberg’s brazen confidence swells within each song," remarked The Quietus. The BBC Review commended Hukkelberg for the "boldness" and "daring" she displays on the album, saying that "she has elevated herself to greater heights." After the release of Featherbrain, Hukkelberg toured Europe and the UK. She opened for Wilco in several European cities.

Hukkelberg contributed a song to the Occupy This Album compilation released in May 2012 to support the Occupy movement. The MP3 release of the set featured a previously unreleased track called "On My Wall," an alternate version of "I Sing You" from Featherbrain.

== Trust ==
Hukkelberg's fifth album Trust was released 20 October 2017 by Propeller Recordings.

== Birthmark ==
Hukkelberg released her sixth album, Birthmark, on 16 August 2019. In her album she goes even more pop than she has before, inspired by a string of collaborations over the last few years with great songwriters and artists such as Emilie Nicolas, Highasakite and Bernhoft, as well as Todd Terje and Bryan Ferry. The album was praised by the likes of BBC and Metro, stating it was "steadfast individuality" (BBC) and "no less than Epic" (Metro).

The album was recorded in her studio in Oslo, but was very much inspired by her trips to big cities like Berlin, Munich, London and Los Angeles.

The themes on Hukkelberg's album have a clear narrative and cover science, faith, love, loss and everyday life. Hukkelberg states, "I go from big existential matters to small everyday things on this album, just like in my own life. It’s about how I look at the world and how it is to live in it and all the relationships, troubles and joy this world can bring".

== Discography ==
=== Albums ===
Title	Release details
Little Things	Released: 8 March 2004; Label: Propeller Recordings; Format: Digital download, CD, vinyl
Rykestraße 68	Released: 4 September 2006; Label: Propeller Recordings; Format: Digital download, CD, vinyl
Blood From A Stone	Released: 12 May 2009; Label: Propeller Recordings; Format: Digital download, CD, vinyl
Featherbrain	Released: 20 February 2012; Label: Propeller Recordings; Format: Digital download, CD, vinyl
Trust	Released: 20 October 2017; Label: Propeller Recordings; Format: Digital download, CD, vinyl
Birthmark	Released: 16 August 2019; Label: Propeller Recordings; Format: Digital download, CD, vinyl

=== Extended plays ===
Title	Release details
Cast Anchor	Released: 9 May 2009; Label: Propeller Recordings; Format: Digital download

Awards
Preceded by Nils Petter Molvær	Recipient of the Open class Spellemannprisen; 2006	Succeeded by Live Maria Roggen
Preceded by Eldbjørg Raknes	Recipient of the Radka Toneff Memorial Award; 2013	Succeeded by Susanna Wallumrød
