= In Fields of Pestilent Grief =

Studio album by Funeral
- Released: 2002
- Recorded: November–December 2000
- Studio: Studio Tinnilus
- Genre: Gothic doom
- Length: 54:33
- Label: Nocturnal Music

Funeral chronology
Tragedies (1995)	In Fields of Pestilent Grief (2002)	From These Wounds (2006)

In Fields of Pestilent Grief is a studio album by the Norwegian funeral doom metal band Funeral. It was their first full-length studio album since their album Tragedies.

== Background ==
Einar Fredriksen, the then-bassist of Funeral, gave several reasons for the seven-year gap in between albums in an interview with doom-metal.com. Some of those reasons, according to Fredriksen, were because Funeral's previous label, Arctic Serenades, decided to rip the band off, Toril Snyen was removed from the band (and replacing her was proved difficult), finding a label, and a lack of musical motivation from some band members. Eventually, the band got to recording this album, and according to Einar, it still had the trademarks of the old Funeral band, but was more inspired by their anger due to the certain aforementioned circumstances.

This was Einar Fredriksen's last interview before committing suicide in January 2003.

== Track listing ==
No.	Title	Length
1.	"Yield to Me"	7:07
2.	"Truly a Suffering"	4:33
3.	"The Repentant"	6:41
4.	"The Stings I Carry"	5:40
5.	"When Light Will Dawn"	8:34
6.	"In Fields of Pestilent Grief"	1:45
7.	"Facing Failure"	6:13
8.	"What Could Have Been"	3:42
9.	"Vile are the Pains"	5:49
10.	"Epilogue"	4:29
Total length:		54:33
