= Erik Faber =

- Born: Erik Alfred Faber-Swensson; May 16, 1977 (age 49)
- Origin: Kristiansand, Norway
- Genres: Pop, Pop rock
- Occupations: Singer, guitarist
- Instruments: Vocals, guitar
- Label: Sony BMG
- Website: Erik Faber Official Website

Erik Alfred Faber-Swensson (born May 16, 1977 in Kristiansand) is a popular Norwegian pop/rock singer-songwriter, who has released 3 albums.

== Life before music ==
As a student in London, Erik Faber was offered a job as a model. He has done photo shoots for magazines like The Face and Arena. He has also taken part in fashion shows for Diesel and Evisu.

== Music career ==
Erik Faber started his music career with the grunge group Pale. He was first a guitarist and then the lead singer of the group. Pale released an EP in 1996 named "Happy Hollow". He left the band in 1999.

In 2001 Sony BMG offered him a contract and in 2002 his debut album Between The Lines was released. Four singles from this album ("On Top of the World", "Between the Lines", "Waiting", and "Sleep") became huge radio hits and reached the Norwegian Top 20 radio charts. The next year, his second album Century came out with singles "Century" and "Yesterday's Call" standing out. The album made it to the Top 10 Albums in the Norwegian Charts. Erik Faber's much anticipated third album was released in 2006. The album is called Passages and includes the international hit single "Not Over" and his duet with Marte Wulff "Racing".

In 2011 he released his first album outside of Norway, a German album called Not Over. The album consists of ten tracks from his previous albums, as well as three newly recorded songs.

== Discography ==
=== Studio albums ===
Title	Album details	Peak chart positions	Certifications
Title	Album details	NOR	Certifications
Between The Lines	Released: 25 February 2002; Label: Epic (#5061222); Formats: CD	11	
Century	Released: 2004; Label: Epic (#5148562); Formats: CD	8	
Passages	Released: 2006; Label: Epic (#88697017572); Formats: CD	13	

=== Compilation albums ===
Title	Album details
Not Over	Released: 2011; Label: Columbia (#88697727192); Formats: CD

== Singles ==
Year	Title	Peak chart positions	Album
Year	Title	NOR	Album
2001	"On Top of The World"	—	Between The Lines
2001	"Between The Lines"	—	Between The Lines
2002	"Sleep"	—	Between The Lines
2002	"Waiting"	—	Between The Lines
2003	"Century"	6	Century
2003	"Yesterday's Call"	—	Century
2004	"Last Night's Boogie"	—	Century
2006	"Not Over"	4	Passages
2006	"Racing"	—	Passages
