= Superfamily (band) =

Norwegian pop rock band

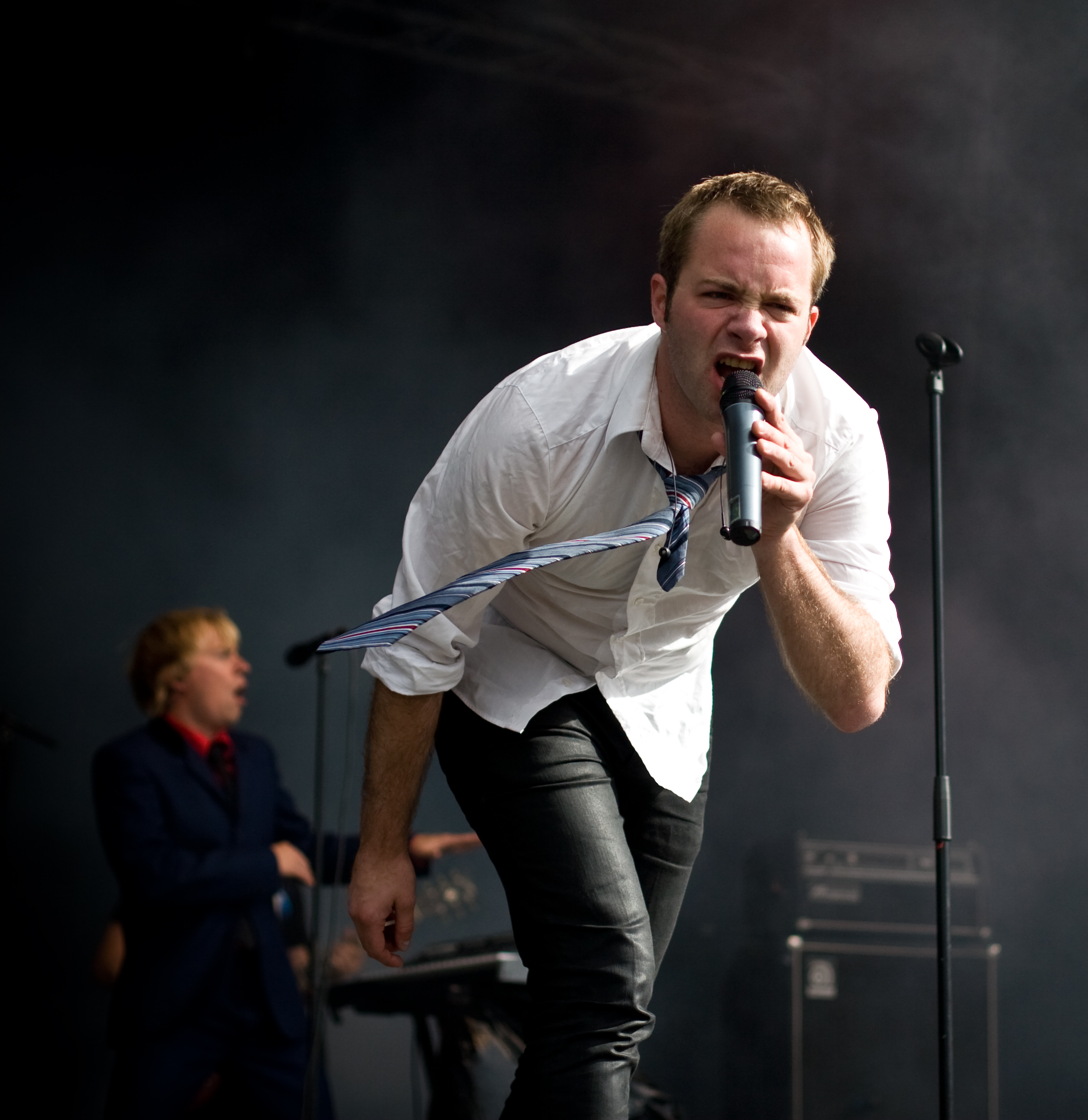
- Superfamily performing at the pstereo festival, 2007

Background information
- Origin: Moss, Norway
- Genres: Pop rock
- Years active: 2002–2013
- Labels: Propeller, Universal Music
- Members: Steven Ray Wilson; Kim Granholt; Martin Steffensen; Richard Lorentz; Øyvind Hoel; Terje Krumins
- Past members: Agnar Lirhus; Tommy Christensen; Hasse Rosbach; Håkon Moe; Anders Nielsen
- Website: www.superfamily.no

Superfamily was a Norwegian pop rock band from Moss, Norway. The band is composed of Steven Ray Wilson (lead vocals), Kim Granholt (keytar, synthesizer), Martin Steffensen (guitar), and Richard Lorentz (drums). Anders Nielsen, Terje Krumins and Håkon Moe provide backing vocals as "choirboys".

Superfamily debuted with an EP in 2004, called Champagne EP. Prior to the release, the band received rotation on NRK P3 and Radio Tango. The band achieved mainstream popularity with the release of their second album, Warszawa, in 2007. The same year, the band won Spellemannprisen in the pop category.

== Formation and early years ==
Superfamily was formed in 2002 by Steven Ray Wilson, Kim Granholt and Martin Steffensen. They wrote and recorded songs at home, and burned "hundreds, maybe thousands" of CD's which they handed out for free. Gradually developing a small fan following, the band decided to add four new members; a bassist, a drummer, and two "choirboys". The band started playing live at local pubs and bars, and in small venues in Oslo. The band also received some publicity through NRK Urørt, a project that promotes unsigned artists. Eventually, the band was contacted by Kåre Vestrheim of Propeller Recordings. Vestrheim attended one of the band's concerts, but was "not particularly impressed" by their performance. After being turned down, the band decided to thoroughly review their problems, by creating a Powerpoint presentation at the University of Oslo, called "How to achieve something live". The band concluded that they needed more discipline on stage.

The next time the band was to perform live in front of a record company, they suffered two power outages. By the time the power came back, almost everyone in the audience had left. However, the Propeller Recordings representatives arrived late, and wouldn't have made it in time if it wasn't for the outages. Following the concert, Propeller agreed to sign the band.

The debut album, Back In Paris, produced by Vestrheim, was released in September 2005. The album received mediocre to positive reviews. Kikka Krog of Verdens Gang gave the album 4/6, and noted that while the album "mostly lived up to its expectations", the latter half was not as interesting as the first. Dagbladet's reviewer Henning Reinton characterized the album as "equal parts smart (in a good way) and stupid (also in a good way)." Two singles from the album, "It's a Lie" and "Taxi Dancing", were put into rotation by NRK P3. Superfamily subsequently received two Alarmpris-nominations in the categories "Best song" (for "Taxi Dancing") and "Best Newcomer".

== Warszawa and mainstream success ==
Superfamily's second album, Warszawa was released on 21 May 2007. The recording of the album took six months. According to Kim Granholt, the band spent one month finishing the first single, "The radio has expressed concerns about what you did last night". The single received significant airplay, and eventually became the most played song on NRK P3 in the first half of 2007, ahead of artists such as Kaiser Chiefs, Amy Winehouse, and The Killers. "When we had finally finished this song ... it was incredibly inspiring that both radio stations and fans responded so well to it", Granholt later said.

"We went into the studio with more finished songs than what we have on the album. But sometimes when you get in the studio you have to pick them apart and build them up again. Try a lot of different things. Keys, tempos. My god, on Warszawa we tried five different tempos combined with different keys. And then we ended up with the first that we tried."
—Steven Wilson, vocalist.

Warszawa received much critical acclaim. Verdens Gang's Thomas Talseth compared the album's sound to The Killers, and also noted "clear echoes of half-forgotten British bands such as The Psychedelic Furs, The Teardrop Explodes and Simple Minds." He also complimented vocalist Steven Wilson for "even making clichés sound like myths". Other reviewers were equally positive. Lars Wærstad characterized the album as "world class synth, all the way up there with The Cure, Ultravox and Tubeway Army." The album remained in the Norwegian charts for seventeen weeks, and peaked at No. 6. Following the success, the band was booked to perform at several festivals, including Slottsfjellfestivalen, Øyafestivalen, and Vikafestivalen.

Superfamily received three Alarmpris-nominations in 2007, and won in the categories "Song of the year" with "The radio has expressed concerns about what you did last night", and in the "Live" category. The band also won Spellemannprisen in the pop category, for Warszawa.

A single from the band's third album was released on May 19, 2009. The song, called "Let's go dancing", has been described as a "classic Superfamily-song, with complex arrangements over a pop beat". The album, Guns tonight, was released on 31 August 2009. The album was mostly well received. Verdens Gang's Stian Fjelldal rated it 6/6, while Dagbladet and Aftenposten were less enthusiastic, the latter giving the album 4/6.

Superfamily released their last album so far in January 2013, called "All American". They toured Norway with a completely new show in the spring 2013.

In early August 2013, the band announced via their Facebook page that they were breaking up, due to work with other projects. The press release mentioned Level & Tyson, Strupene and starting a studio as some of the other projects they would be focusing on.

== Education ==
Superfamily is often referred to as Norway's most well-educated and academic band. At one point, every member of the band had Master's degrees, or were in the progress of getting one. Vocalist Steven Wilson holds a Ph.D. in chemistry. He defended his thesis, On-line multidimensional LC-techniques. Determinations of known and unknown compounds in limited and complex samples, in December 2007. Kim Granholt is a biologist and Martin Steffensen is a sociologist.

== Discography ==
| Year | Details |
|---|---|
| 2005 | Back in Paris: Released: September 2005; Label: Propeller Recordings |
| 2007 | Warszawa: Released: May 2007; Label: Propeller Recordings/Sonet |
| 2009 | Guns Tonight: Released: August 2009; Label: Propeller Recordings |
| 2013 | All American: Released: Jan 2013; Label: Das Kirurg/Tuba |

Awards
| Preceded by Minor Majority | Recipient of the best Pop band Spellemannprisen; 2007 | Succeeded by Real Ones |
