= Marit Larsen =

Norwegian singer and songwriter (born 1983)

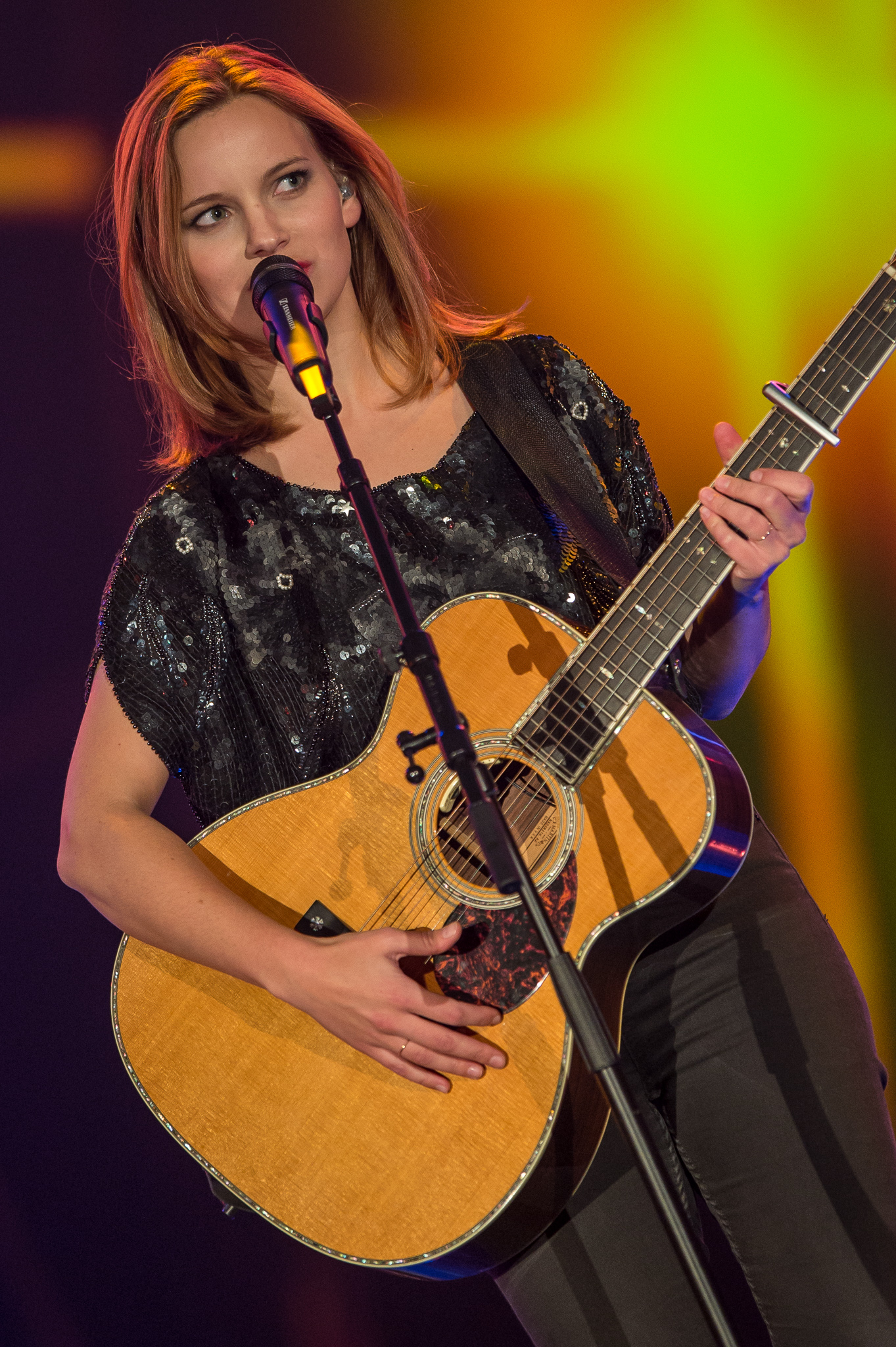
- Marit Larsen in Nuremberg, December 2015
- Born: Marit Elisabeth Larsen; 1 July 1983 (age 43); Lørenskog, Norway
- Occupations: Singer; songwriter; musician
- Years active: 1993–present
- Spouse: Alexander Buchmann (m. 2016)
- Children: 1
- Musical career
- Genres: Pop; folk; pop-folk; acoustic
- Instruments: Vocals, guitar, piano, mandolin, harmonica, glockenspiel, zither, tambura, domra, celesta
- Labels: Atlantic (1998–2002); EMI (1996–1998, 2005–2013); Warner (2013–2015) (Nordic countries); Sony (2008–2015) (other countries); Håndbrygg Records (2016–present)
- Website: www.maritlarsen.no

Marit Elisabeth Larsen (born 1 July 1983) is a Norwegian singer and songwriter. She began playing violin aged five and played it until the age of eight. She gained international fame during her teenage years as a member of the pop duo M2M with childhood friend Marion Raven. She then pursued her own music career, releasing her debut solo album Under the Surface in 2006. Her second album, The Chase, was released in Norway in October 2008. Her third album, titled Spark, was released in Norway, Denmark, Sweden and Finland on 18 November 2011, and in Germany, Austria and Switzerland on 16 December 2011. Her fourth studio album When the Morning Comes was released on 20 October 2014. Larsen toured in its support within Norway with her own concerts, played songs from the album in Germany and Switzerland at public festivals and was the opening act at two of Johannes Oerding's concerts in November 2015.

== Career ==
=== M2M and early solo career ===
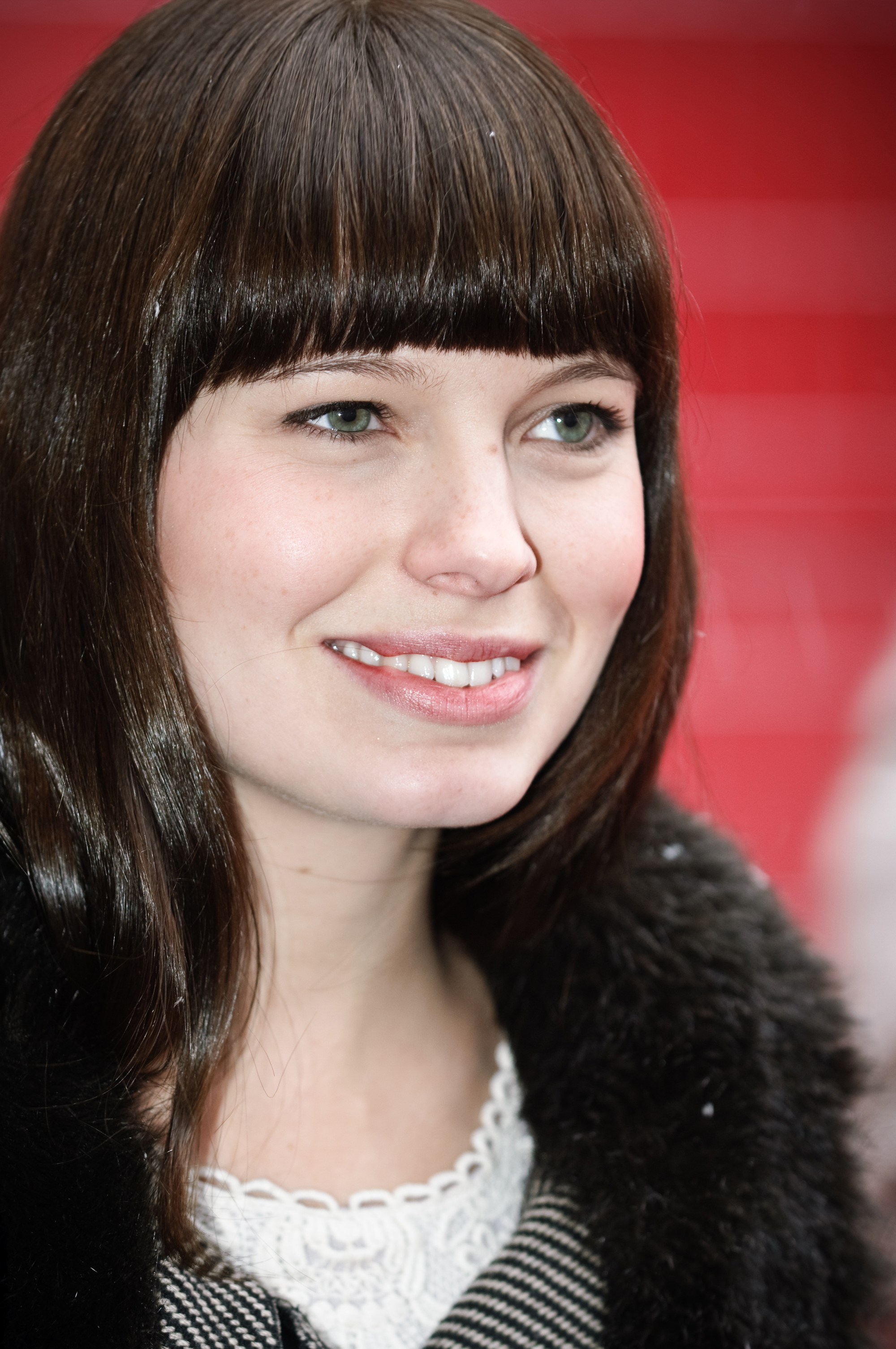
Marit Larsen in 2009

Marit Larsen was born in Lørenskog, Norway. She became friends with Marion Raven at age five, and they formed their own band when they were eight, naming it "Hubba Bubba" after their favourite bubblegum. They released a children's album, Synger Kjente Barnesanger, under the band name "Marit & Marion". The album was nominated for a Spellemannprisen award when they were both 12 years old. They later decided to shorten the band name to M2M. Atlantic records signed them to a worldwide contract in 1998. Their debut single, Don't Say You Love Me, was both a critical and commercial success. The song was part of their debut album, Shades of Purple. Despite critical acclaim, their second album, The Big Room, did not perform as well commercially, and the duo broke up the year of its release.

After the breakup of M2M, Raven began her solo career, while Larsen took time off to go to school. Fan interest was reignited in 2004 and early 2005 when Larsen made several appearances in Norway, showing off a darker-haired image and new music with increased instrumental and lyrical scope. Larsen performed three original songs, titled "This Time Tomorrow", "Recent Illusion", and "Walls", on NRK radio in October 2004, showcasing her skills at both guitar and piano. She also performed live at the highly anticipated by:Larm concert in February 2005.

=== 2005–2007: Under the Surface ===
Larsen recorded her debut album in fall 2005, Under the Surface, with her new record label, EMI. The first single, "Don't Save Me", made radio impact on 3 January 2006, and quickly climbed into the top ten on many Norwegian charts and playlists. After the physical single release on 6 February 2006, "Don't Save Me" jumped to No. 1 on the official Norwegian singles chart in its second week of availability, and then spent five consecutive weeks in the top spot. The second single released from the album was the title track "Under the Surface". Both the single and its accompanying video were released in Norway in May 2006 and within a month the single became the most widely played track on Norwegian radio. After debuting at No. 19 the single peaked at No. 6 and spent 16 weeks inside the Norwegian Top 20. "Only a Fool" and "Solid Ground" were the third and fourth singles released, respectively. Her father Geir Tore Larsen played cello on the album, and her then-boyfriend, the musician Thom Hell, was one of the musicians on it.

Under the Surface, which was released in Norway on 6 March 2006, contains 11 songs, most of which were written solely by Larsen. Touted as "what many people consider to be the most eagerly awaited album of 2006" (according to Norwegian magazine Plan B), the record debuted and peaked at No. 3 on the sales chart in Norway. On 31 March 2006, after just three weeks of sales, Under the Surface became a certified gold record in Norway, selling over 20,000 copies. In late 2006 and early 2007, "Under the Surface" won Larsen other accolades, including the award for Best Norwegian Act at the MTV Europe Music Awards, and the Spellemannprisen (Norwegian Grammy) awards for Best Female Artist and Best Video ("Don't Save Me"). After Larsen's Spellemannprisen victories in January 2007, the album crossed the 40,000 copy mark, qualifying it for platinum certification. It was later announced in May 2007 that the album had reached double platinum status. In addition, she was the most played artist on NRK P3 radio in 2006, with her three singles ("Don't Save Me", "Under the Surface", and "Only a Fool") being played collectively more than 880 times.

Concurrently with the release of "Under the Surface", Larsen participated in the "Lyd i mørket" charity concert series in early March 2006. She began a Norwegian club tour in late April, headlining concerts for the first time in her career. She then played in music festivals across Norway during the summer, and held a second Norwegian club tour starting in October 2006.

"Under the Surface" was released in India and Thailand in late 2006, and in November, "Don't Save Me" began to be played on MTV Asia. Larsen also began making international appearances, performing at special events in Germany and Spain in September 2006, India in October 2006, and France in January 2007. She appeared in the United States at South by Southwest in March 2007. On 2 May 2007, Right Bank Music announced that Larsen would be managed by them for a possible release in the U.S.

=== 2008–2010: The Chase and "If a Song Could Get Me You" ===
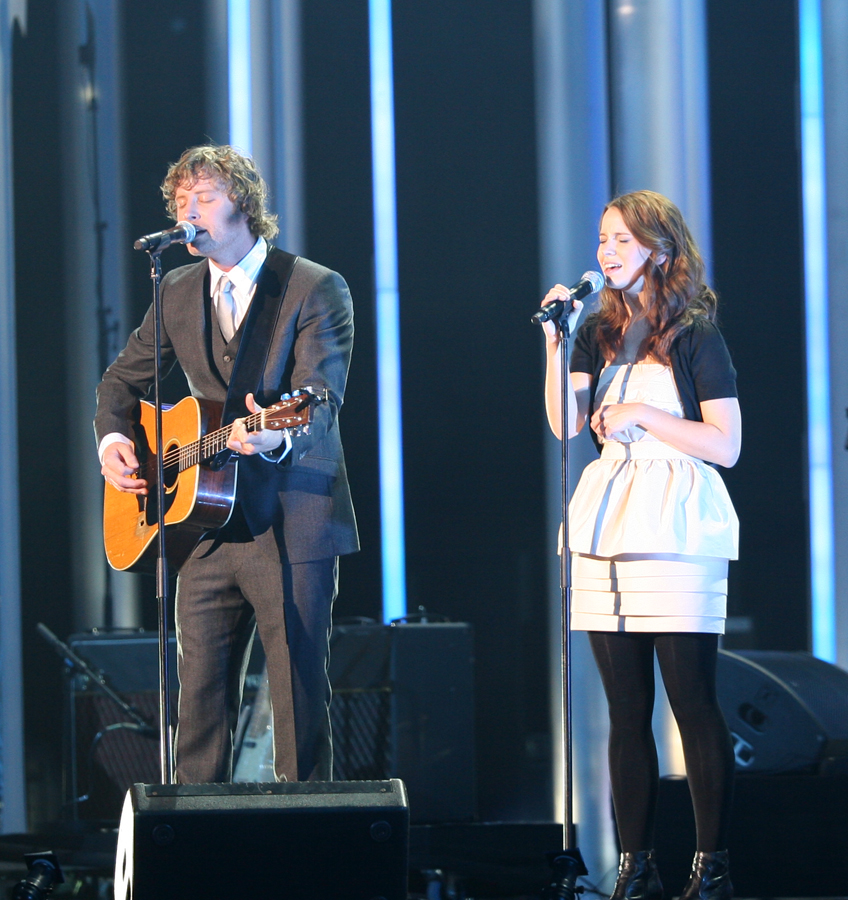
Marit Larsen and Dierks Bentley at Nobels Prize in Oslo 2008

Larsen's second solo album, The Chase, was released in Norway on 13 October 2008 and in Sweden on 19 November 2008. Like Under the Surface, it was well received by critics; in December, it was named as the top album of the year by Dagbladet reviewers.

The first single from The Chase, titled "If a Song Could Get Me You", shot to No. 1 on the Norwegian singles chart in its first week of sales in August 2008, and was later nominated for the Spellemannprisen award as Hit of the Year. The second single was "I've Heard Your Love Songs" (released 27 October 2008), and another song from the album, "Steal My Heart", was used in the soundtrack of the Norwegian movie I et speil, i en gåte ("Through a glass, darkly").

Early 2009, Larsen joined Jason Mraz as an opening act for his European spring tour. She was invited by Mraz when they met each other during the Nobel Peace Prize concert in 2008.

Larsen released "If a Song Could Get Me You" as her first single outside Norway. It was released in Germany, Austria, Switzerland and Iceland. In Germany and Austria it became a number-one single. In Switzerland it peaked at No. 2. The song also peaked at No. 19 in Iceland.

In November 2009, Larsen started her first German-Swiss Tour.

On 24 November, Verdens Gang, a Norwegian newspaper, made a list of the best Norwegian songs of the past decade 2000–2009. "Under the Surface" was judged as the best song of the decade, making her 1st place on the list. Her song "If A Song Could Get Me You" came in 4th place and her album "Under the Surface" gets 2nd place for the best album of the decade.

Marit recorded a duet with Belgian singer-songwriter Milow titled "Out of My Hands". The song was originally contained in Milow's album "Coming of Age" released in 2008 in Belgium. The duet version featuring Marit was released on 12 February 2010 via Milow's MySpace page and Marit's YouTube page.

In July 2010, Marit Larsen released the remake single of "Don't Save Me".

=== 2011–2013: Spark ===
January 2011 Larsen recorded the song "Vår Beste Dag" (Our Best Day) in her native language for the NRK. Released only in Norway, it reached No. 1.

On 1 August, Marit Larsen started to record her 3rd solo album at Propeller Recordings.

On 7 October Marit Larsen announced that the album will be called Spark including 10 new tracks. The album was released in Norway, Sweden, Finland, and Denmark on 18 November. In Germany, Switzerland and Austria the album was released on 16 December. The first single, "Coming Home" had premiered on NRK P1 and on her Facebook page on 15 October. The music video had premiered on Verdens Gang's website on 12 November.

On 24 October 2011, "Coming Home" was frequently played on the radio in the Philippines and was named the "Most Wanted Song Of The Month." The song topped the charts in the Philippines for 4 consecutive weeks and gave Marit her first number 1 song as a solo artist in the Philippine Top 100 Songs. A previous song, "The Day You Went Away" (2000) with M2M (band) was number 1 in the Philippines for 9 non-consecutive weeks. On 16 December "Coming Home" was performed by Marit Larsen on the finals of Idol Norge while Marion Raven was one of the judges on the same show. On 9 January 2012, despite not being released as a single, "Last Night" received moderate radio airplay success in the Philippines and stayed on top of the charts for 2 consecutive weeks and gave Marit her second number 1 song in the Philippine Top 100 Songs. It also reached number 3 in Thailand.

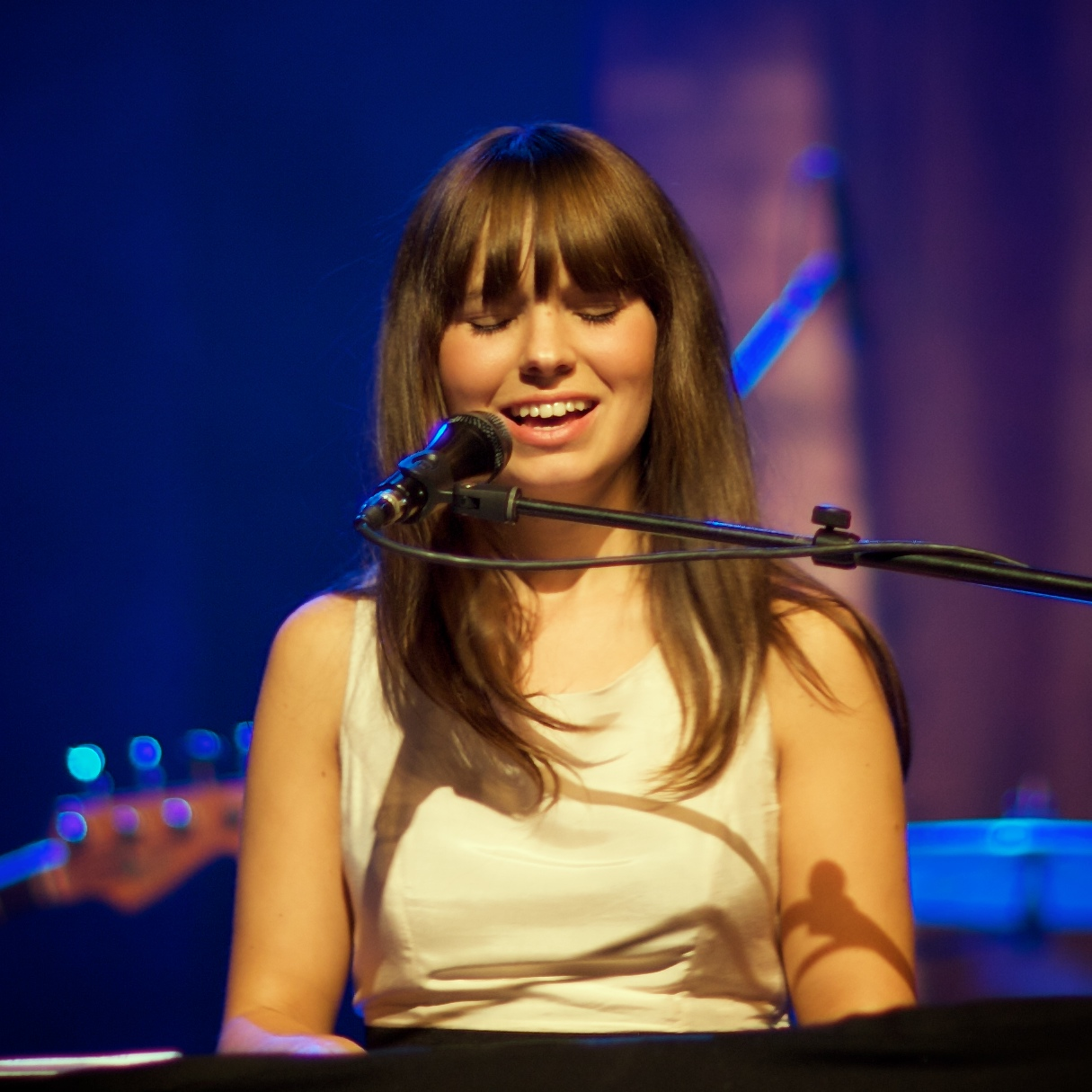
Larsen in 2009

=== 2014–2016: When the Morning Comes, and Joni Was Right ===
On 14 July 2014, Marit premiered her single "I Don't Want to Talk About It" from the album When the Morning Comes on NRK P3 radio. The single was released on 4 August 2014. The album, which climbed to No. 1 in Norway, was released in the Nordic countries on 20 October 2014. In Germany, Switzerland and Austria it was released on 27 March 2015. In the USA When the Morning Comes was released through iTunes on 29 January 2016.

Between 14 January and 14 February 2015, Marit Larsen played nineteen concerts on her "When The Morning Comes Tour" in Norway. On 18 January 2016, despite not being released as an official single, "Before You Fell" received commercial radio airplay success in the Philippines which helped the song to stay on top of the charts for 6 consecutive weeks and gave Marit her third number 1 song in the Philippine Top 100 Songs. the song was named as the "February Conqueror" by various DJs for staying at number 1 for the whole month. On 7 March, it was replaced by "Please Don't Fall For Me", her fourth number 1 song in the Philippine Top 100 Songs, which stayed on top for 2 non-consecutive weeks and made Marit the second musical act to have one song replace another in the number 1 position; the first was in 2009 when The Black Eyed Peas chart topping hit Boom Boom Pow was replaced by I Gotta Feeling after 8 weeks.

In January 2016 Marit Larsen announced that she will release new material in April 2016. She also announced that she will release her new material on her own, independent label (Håndbryggrecords), and will continue to release music independently in the future. The EP, entitled Joni Was Right, was released on 1 April 2016. It contains five tracks and is available on iTunes and other online music stores. On 9 September 2016 the EP Joni Was Right II, which contains five tracks, was released on iTunes and other online music stores. On 9 September 2016 Marit Larsen also released a CD and a vinyl record called Joni Was Right I / II, where the ten tracks of the two EP releases were combined. The CD release of Joni was Right I / II entered the Norwegian album charts at No. 36 on 16 September 2016.

=== 2019–present: Book releases and Hun er min ===
In 2019 Marit Larsen published a children's book called Der Agnes bor (Where Agnes Lives). In 2023 Larsen published her second children's book titled Sofia finner en sang (Sofia Finds a Song).

In 2024 Marit Larsen's EP Hun er min was released. This EP was the release of five songs written in Norwegian and one in English. On this release Larsen collaborated with the Norwegian songwriter Emilie Stoesen Christensen, and the Norwegian author Kjersti Annesdatter Skomsvold.

In 2026, starting in January, Marit Larsen is a guest at the Norwegian TV show Hver gang vi møtes. On this TV show musicians will meet and play cover versions of each other's songs.

== Personal life ==
Larsen dated Isaac Hanson for two years when the two met during M2M's tour with his band, Hanson, in 2000.

Larsen married former international handball player Alexander Buchmann in 2016, and they share a daughter named Astrid Ira.

== Discography ==
=== Studio albums ===
Year	Album	Chart positions			Certification
Year	Album	NOR	GER	SWI	Certification
2006	Under the Surface	3	—	—	NOR: 2× Platinum
2008	The Chase	1	—	—	NOR: Platinum
2011	Spark	2	57	36	NOR: Gold
2014	When the Morning Comes	1	71	53	
2016	Joni Was Right I / II	36	—	—	

=== Compilation albums ===
Year	Album	Chart positions				Certification
Year	Album	AUT	GER	SWI	EU	Certification
2009	If a Song Could Get Me You	7	3	2	10	AUT: Gold; GER: Platinum; SWI: Gold

=== Extended plays ===
Year	Extended play
2016	Joni Was Right
2016	Joni Was Right II
2024	Hun er min

=== Singles ===
Year	Single	Chart positions								Parent album
Year	Single	NOR	ICE	AUT	GER	SWI	EU	PHI	THA	Parent album
2006	"Don't Save Me"	1	—	—	—	—	—	—	—	Under the Surface
2007	"Under the Surface"	6	—	—	—	—	—	—	—	Under the Surface
2007	"Only a Fool"	14	—	—	—	—	—	—	—	Under the Surface
2007	"Solid Ground"	—	—	—	—	—	—	—	—	Under the Surface
2008	"If a Song Could Get Me You"	1	—	—	—	—	—	—	—	The Chase
2008	"I've Heard Your Love Songs"	—	—	—	—	—	—	—	—	The Chase
2009	"Addicted"	—	—	—	—	—	—	—	—	The Chase
2009	"Fuel"	—	—	—	—	—	—	—	—	The Chase
2009	"If a Song Could Get Me You" (remake)	—	19	1	1	2	5	—	—	If a Song Could Get Me You
2010	"Under the Surface" (remake)	—	—	64	38	—	—	—	—	If a Song Could Get Me You
2010	"Don't Save Me" (remake)	—	—	—	48	63	—	—	—	If a Song Could Get Me You
2011	"Vår beste dag"	1	—	—	—	—	—	—	—	non-album single
2011	"Coming Home"	—	—	—	—	—	—	1	—	Spark
2012	"Don't Move"	—	—	—	—	—	—	—	—	Spark
2012	"Last Night"	—	—	—	—	—	—	1	3	Spark
2014	"I Don't Want to Talk About It"	—	—	—	—	—	—	—	—	When the Morning Comes
2015/2016	"Faith & Science"	—	—	—	—	—	—	—	—	When the Morning Comes
2015/2016	"Please Don't Fall for Me"	—	—	—	—	—	—	1	—	When the Morning Comes
2015/2016	"Before You Fell"	—	—	—	—	—	—	1	—	When the Morning Comes
2015/2016	"Traveling Alone"	—	—	—	—	—	—	—	—	When the Morning Comes
2022	"Hva er igjen av oss"	—	—	—	—	—	—	—	—	Hun er min
2022	"På et sekund"	—	—	—	—	—	—	—	—	Hun er min
2022	"For vår jord"	—	—	—	—	—	—	—	—	Hun er min
2026	"When Susannah Cries" (Hver gang vi møtes)	31	—	—	—	—	—	—	—	Non-album singles
2026	"When the Lights Go Out" (Hver gang vi møtes)	41	—	—	—	—	—	—	—	Non-album singles
2026	"Never Have I Ever" (Hver gang vi møtes)	82	—	—	—	—	—	—	—	Non-album singles
2026	"Gro Harlem Brundtland" (Hver gang vi møtes)	40	—	—	—	—	—	—	—	Non-album singles
2026	"Tar det i morgen" (Hver gang vi møtes; with Synne Vo)	82	—	—	—	—	—	—	—	Non-album singles

==== Guest appearances ====
Year	Single	Chart positions					Album
Year	Single	PHI	NOR	AUT	GER	SWI	Album
2010	"Out of My Hands" (with Milow)	7	25	44	19	21	Milow
2010	"Oh My Sweet Carolina" (with Milow)	—	—	—	—	—	Milow
2012	"God natt" (with Vinni)	—	—	—	—	—	Oppvåkningen
2014	"Take Everything Back" (with Sondre Lerche, Kato Ådland, Sylvie Lewis)	—	—	—	—	—	The Sleepwalker

==== Covers and unofficial releases ====
Single
"Dancing in the Dark"
"Dear Someone"
"Devastating"
"Fix You"
"FourFiveSeconds"
"Heartbreakfree"
"I Love You Always Forever"
"I Think It's Gonna Rain Today"
"I Want to Sing That Rock and Roll"
"My Boyfriend's Back"
"My Oh My"
"Walls (October Month)"

== Music videos ==
Year	Title
2006	"Don't Save Me"
2006	"Under the Surface"
2009	"If A Song Could Get Me You"
2010	"Under the Surface" (re-release) [Version 2]
2010	"Out of My Hands" (with Milow)
2010	"Don't Save Me" (re-release) [Version 2]
2010	"Fuel"
2011	"Coming Home"
2014	"I Don't Want to Talk About It"
2015	"I Don't Want to Talk About It" (re-release) [Version 2]
2015	"Traveling Alone"
2015	"Shine On (Little Diamond)"
2016	"Running Out of Road"
2016	"Morgan, I Might"

== Awards and nominations ==
Year	Award	Category	Result
2006	MTV Europe Music Awards	Best Norwegian Artist	Won
2006	Spellemannprisen	Best Video – "Don't Save Me"	Won
2006	Spellemannprisen	Best Female Artist	Won
2006	Spellemannprisen	Best Song – "Under the Surface"	Won
2007	Norwegian Alarm-awards	Best Pop Act	Won
2008	Spellemannprisen	Best Female Artist	Nominated
2008	Spellemannprisen	Hit of the Year – "If a Song Could Get Me You"	Nominated
2009	Norsk Artistforbund Honorary Award	Best Artist Award	Won
2009	Radio Regenbogen Award	Hörer-Preis	Won
2009	VG Newspaper Award	Best Norwegian Song of the Decade – "Under the Surface"	Won
2010	Echo Music Award	Best International Rock/Pop Female Artist	Nominated
2010	Echo Music Award	Best International Newcomer	Nominated
2010	Gammleng-prisen	Best Pop Music	Won
2011	Music Export Norway Award	Best Artist	Won
2011	Spellemannprisen	Best Female Artist – Spark	Nominated
2011	Spellemannprisen	Best Composer	Nominated
2012	Drums.de MUSIK FACH-Award	Best Album 2012 – Spark	Won
2014	Spellemannprisen	Best Composer	Nominated
2014	Spellemannprisen	Best Lyricist	Nominated
2017	Edvardprisen	Popular Music – Joni Was Right I / II	Won

Awards
Preceded by Ane Brun	Recipient of the best Female Pop Solo Artist Spellemannprisen; 2005	Succeeded by Susanne Sundfør
Preceded by Amund Maarud	Recipient of the popular music Edvardprisen; 2017	Succeeded by -
