= Don't Save Me (Marit Larsen song) =

Single by Marit Larsen

from the album Under the Surface
- B-side: "Fuel" (German version)
- Released: 4 February 2006 (Norway); 2010 (Germany)
- Recorded: 2005
- Genre: Country pop
- Length: 3:48
- Label: EMI (NOR), Sony Music (GER)
- Songwriter(s): Marit Larsen, Peter Zizzo
- Producer(s): Kåre Christoffer Vestrheim

Marit Larsen singles chronology
"Don't Save Me" (2006)	"Under the Surface" (2006)

Music video
- "Don't Save Me" on YouTube

"Don't Save Me" is the debut solo single by Norwegian pop music singer and M2M member Marit Larsen, released from her debut album Under the Surface. The single was released on 2 February 2006 in Norway. After debuting at No. 3, the single climbed to No. 1 and stayed at the top for five consecutive weeks.

== Track listing ==
Norwegian CD single

1. "Don't Save Me" Album Version – 3:48
2. "Don't Save Me" Enhanced Music Video

== Charts ==
Chart (2006–2010)	Peak position
Austrian Singles Chart	73
German Singles Chart	47
Luxembourg Singles Chart	5
Norwegian Singles Chart	1
Swiss Singles Chart	63
