= Under the Surface (Marit Larsen album) =

Studio album by Marit Larsen
- Released: 6 March 2006
- Recorded: 2005
- Genre: Pop, folk
- Length: 37:01
- Label: EMI
- Producer: Kåre Christoffer Vestrheim

Marit Larsen chronology
Under the Surface (2006)	The Chase (2008)

Singles from Under The Surface
- 1. "Don't Save Me" Released: February 4, 2006; 2. "Under the Surface" Released: April 17, 2006; 3. "Only a Fool (Radio Release Only)" Released: September 18, 2006; 4. "Solid Ground (Radio Release Only)" Released: January 15, 2007

Professional ratings
Review scores
Source	Rating
AllMusic	4.5/5 stars
Stylus	A−
Aftenposten	5/6 stars
Dagsavisen	5/6 stars
Verdens Gang	5/6 stars
Groove.no	5/7 stars

Under the Surface is the debut album from Norwegian singer-songwriter and M2M member Marit Larsen which was released on 6 March 2006. All but three of the songs on the album were written solely by Marit herself. The album went gold in Norway after selling more than 20,000 copies in less than three weeks. The album debuted and peaked at No. 3 on the sales chart in Norway. The album spent 52 weeks on VG Topp 40 and 62 weeks on VG Topp 30 Norsk.

== Track listing ==
No.	Title	Writer(s)	Length
1.	"In Came the Light"	Marit Larsen	1:12
2.	"Under the Surface"	Larsen	4:12
3.	"Don't Save Me"	Larsen, Peter Zizzo	3:49
4.	"Only a Fool"	Larsen, Peter De Leon	4:07
5.	"Solid Ground"	Larsen	3:27
6.	"This Time Tomorrow"	Larsen	3:21
7.	"Recent Illusion"	Larsen	2:06
8.	"The Sinking Game"	Larsen, Kåre Christoffer Vestrheim	3:53
9.	"To an End"	Larsen, Egil Clausen	3:43
10.	"Come Closer"	Larsen	4:08
11.	"Poison Passion"	Larsen	3:01
Total length:			36:55

== Technical credits ==
- Stian Andersen – Photography
- Erland Dahlen – Percussion, Drums
- Silje Haugan – Violin
- Lars Horntveth – Conductor, String Arrangements
- Martin Horntveth – Percussion, Drums, Clapping
- Vegard Johnsen – Violin
- Frode Larsen – Violin
- Marit Larsen – Producer, Guitar (Acoustic), Guitar, Harmonica, Mandolin, Percussion, Piano, arranger, Glockenspiel, Guitar (Electric), Vocals, Clapping, Cover Design, Tambor, Guitar (Nylon String)
- Odd Nordstoga – Guitar (Acoustic), Accordion
- Kåre Vestrheim – Producer

== Chart ==
Chart (2006)	Peak position
Norwegian Albums Chart	3

== Certifications ==
Country	Certifications	Sales/Shipments
Norway	2× Platinum	80,000+
