= Pstereo Festival =

Music festival in Trondheim, Norway

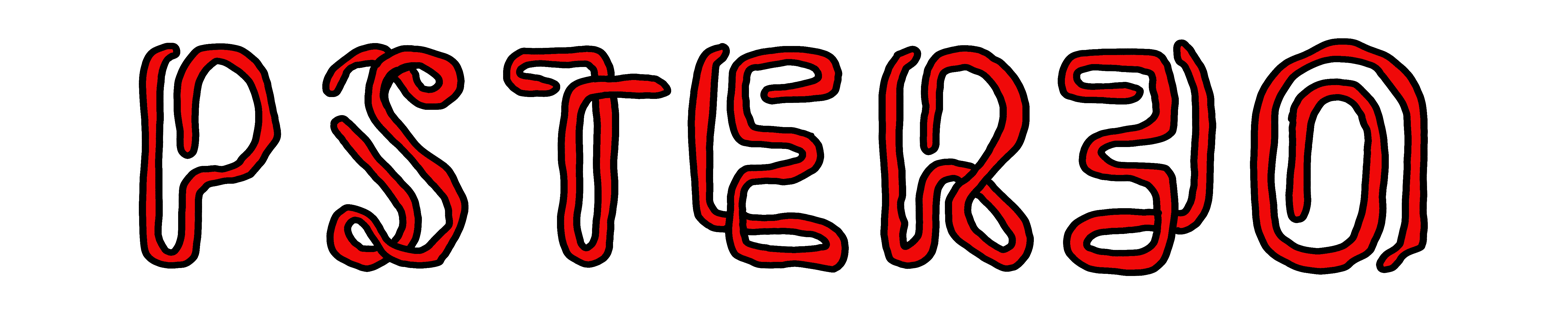
- Genre: Music Festival
- Date: Mid August
- Begins: 16 August 2018
- Ends: 18 August 2018
- Frequency: Annually
- Location: Trondheim
- Country: Norway
- Years active: 2007 – present
- Website: www.pstereo.no

Pstereo (initiated 2007 in Trondheim, Norway) is a music festival arranged at Marinen, Trondheim, every year in August.

== Background ==
The festival is named after Pstereo an album by DumDum Boys, and mainly focuses on music in the genres elektronika, pop and rock. Next to the music the focus is on environmental awareness. Pstereo had 17,500 visitors in 2009. In 2014 the number of spectators had grown to approximately 25,000.

== Bands and artists (in selection) ==
Year	Lineup
2018	Kraftwerk (DE), Thåström (SE), Aurora, Mogwai (UK), Tom Odell (UK), Millencolin (SE), Gåte, Cezinando, Sigrid, Big Thief (US), Dâm-FunK (US), Datarock, Gundelach, Kjartan Lauritzen, Lil Pump (US), Mount Kimbie (UK), Sepultura (BR), Sløtface, Store P, Thulsa Doom, Zeal & Ardor, deLillos, Autolaser, Bokassa, Fette Najs: DJ Joddski & Drahpaa, Fieh, Frances Wave, GRANT (SE) GURLS, Halie, Haunted Mansions, ISÁK, Jade Bird (UK), Japanese Breakfast (US), Kristoffer Lo, LAMBSBREAD SOUND, Mental Overdrive, Morbo y Mambo (AR), Lonely Kamel, PURPURRPURPLE, Rolling Blackouts Coastal Fever (AUS), Sassy 009, Sheer Mag (US)
2017	Alt-J (∆) (UK), Röyksopp, Rival Sons (US), Slowdive (UK), Janove, Phantogram (US), Silvana Imam (SE), Ane Brun, Sonny Alven, KANO (UK), Fireside (SE), Cymbals Eat Guitars (US), Slaves (UK), Hopalong Knut, Spidergawd, The Bronx (US), Sigrid, Fantastic Negrito (US), Aiming for Enrike, Shame (UK), Pom Poko, Brutal Kuk, Steamdome, Colter Wall (CA), Doffs Poi, No. 4, Hkeem + Temur, Beach Fossils (US), Sugarhill Gang (US), JFDR, Jo Sverre, Amanda Tenfjord, Soup, Jaga Jazzist, Juri Gagarin, Knxwledge (US), SVANI, Mato Grytten, Ballo, Another Trondheim, Fette Najs: DJ Joddski & DJ Drahpaa, Sinjin Hawke (CA/US), Erlend Smithee & LUD, Trøbbel på taket, Fredfades, Chmmr, André Bratten
2016	Sigur Rós (IS), Highasakite, Dumdum Boys, The Lumineers (US), Veronica Maggio (SE), Lars Vaular, All Them Witches, Sondre Justad, The Thurston Moore Band (US), Kakkmaddafakka, Phil Cook & The Guitarheels (US), Bendik, Band of Gold, Dunbarrow, Husky (AUS), Ary, Todd Terje, Luke Elliot (US), Hinds (ES), Uncle Acid & The Deadbeats (UK), Hudson Mohawke (UK), Daniel Kvammen, Seratones (US), Astrid S, The Underachievers (US), RGB Unit, POSTAAL (FR/UK), Black Moon Circle, Barren Womb, Dagny, Beach Slang (US), Kari Harneshaug, Snøskred, Pumarosa (UK), Deafheaven (US), Kajander, Kjartan Gaulfossen & Erlend Smithee, Virkelig, Mats Wawa, Antler, Kitfai, Dreamarcher, Whales & This Lake, Cezinando
2015	Band of Horses (US), La Roux (UK), Susanne Sundfør, Opeth (SE), Yelawolf (US), Emilie Nicolas, Spidergawd, Baroness (US), Team Me, Ida Jenshus, Hvitmalt Gjerde, SOAK (UK), Jello Biafra & GSM (US), The Sword (US), Broen, The Districts (US), Cymbals Eat Guitars (US), Døden, Formation (UK), Matoma, Ratking (US), Aurora, Wand (US), Diddaboy, Hage, Slutface, Marie Denise, Panda Panda, Red Mountains
2014	Franz Ferdinand (UK), Biffy Clyro (UK), St. Vincent (US), Kvelertak, Highasakite, Johndoe, Skambankt, Stein Torleif Bjella, Sigurd Julius, Hedvig Mollestad Trio, Cloud Nothings (US), Warpaint (US), Shitrich, Dråpe, The Dodos (US), Cult of Luna (SE), Tungtvann, Rytmeklubben, Kelela (ET/US), Gold Panda (UK), Jerry Folk, The Fjords, Elliphant (SE), MØ (DK), Short Skirts, Svankropp, Blomst, Jagged Vision, Woodland, Swanlike
2013	The xx (UK), Motorpsycho, Karpe Diem, Dizzee Rascal (UK), Monster Magnet (US), Dry the River (UK), G.O.D.S., Wovenhand (US), Ósk, Half Moon Run (CA), Savages (UK), Graveyard (SE), Casa Murilo, Phox (US), Oslo Ess, Goat (SE), Ole Torjus, Emilie Nicolas, Phil T Rich, Kate Boy (SE), Carmen Villain, Bendik, Cashmere Cat, Baauer (US), Anne Sandøy, Barren Womb, Aukra, Christoffer Øien, High Priest of Saturn, Rytmeklubben
2012	Mew (DK), Kaizers Orchestra, First Aid Kit (SE), Spiritualized (UK), Raga Rockers, Stein Torleif Bjella, Kylesa (US), Jonas Alaska, Highasakite, Avi Buffalo (US), Big K.R.I.T. (US), Den Svenska Bjørnstammen (SE), Sigurd Julius, Summer Camp (UK), Team Me, Grandaddy (US), Sameblod (SE), Driver Drive Faster (UK), Mikhael Paskalev, Rustie (UK), Sweden, Fremmed Rase, JEFF the Brotherhood (US), Totally Enormous Extinct Dinosaurs (UK), Kari Harneshaug, Blomst, Amish 82, Conurbia, Eye of Horus, Flashback Caruso
2011	The Roots (US), Death From Above 1979 (CA), Santigold (US), Håkan Hellström (SE), Lissie (US), PELbO, Washed Out (US), Kråkesølv, Norma Sass, Honningbarna, Kylesa (US), Wannskrækk, Departure, The Tallest Man on Earth (SE), Jamie Woon (UK), 22, MachineBirds, Newham Generals (UK), Team Me, Glasser (US), Bad Spit, Robots In Disguise (UK), Death Letters (NL), Monolithic, Therese Aune, Bendik, G.O.D.S., Angelicas Elegy, Mageplask, Autolaser
2010	Robyn (SE), Dumdum Boys, Teddybears, The Pains of Being Pure at Heart (US), Megafaun (US), Åge Aleksandersen og Sambandet, Lars Vaular, [Ingenting] (SE), Navigators, When Saints Go Machine (DK), Kvelertak, John Olav Nilsen & Gjengen, Moddi, Rubik (FI), Band of Skulls (UK), Yacht & The Straight Gaze (US), St. Helen, Jack Dalton, Goldielocks, Shining, Soup, Blood On Wheels, Hanne Hukkelberg, Israelvis, 7stones, Elephantine, Oskar, Your Headlights Are On, The Great Big Taters, Miran
2009	Röyksopp, Thåström (SE), Primal Scream (UK), Motorpsycho, Calexico (US), Gang of Four (UK), Marina and The Diamonds (UK), Late of the Pier (UK), Ane Brun, Ulver, Jaga Jazzist, Ruphus, Skambankt, I Was A King, Kim Hiorthøy, Harrys Gym, Stina Stjern, Fjorden Baby!, Filthy Dukes (UK), Slagsmålsklubben (SE), Black Debbath, The School, 22, Amish 82, Klaus Sonstad and the Diapers, Pony the Pirate, Norma Sass, Brokedown Palace
2008	Dumdum Boys, bob hund (SE), Clutch (US), Shy Child (US), Balkan Beat Box (US/IL), 1990s (UK), Metronomy (UK), Múm (IS), Loney Dear (SE), Lo-Fi-Fnk (SE), Datarock, Lillebjørn Nilsen, Johndoe, Lukestar, Gerilja, Egil Olsen, Torch, The South, Bitch Cassidy, The Work, Beneva vs. Clark Nova, Casiokids, The New Wine, Captain Credible, Katzenjammer, Bad Apple feat. Big Love Daddy, Kristi Aspen, Steve Cooling
2007	NOFX (US), Ladytron (UK), The Boys (UK), The Lemonheads (US), I'm From Barcelona (SE), Sahara Hotnights (SE), The Lionheart Brothers, Magnet, Monomen, Valentourettes, Moving Oos, Ida Maria, Superfamily
