= Katzenjammer discography =

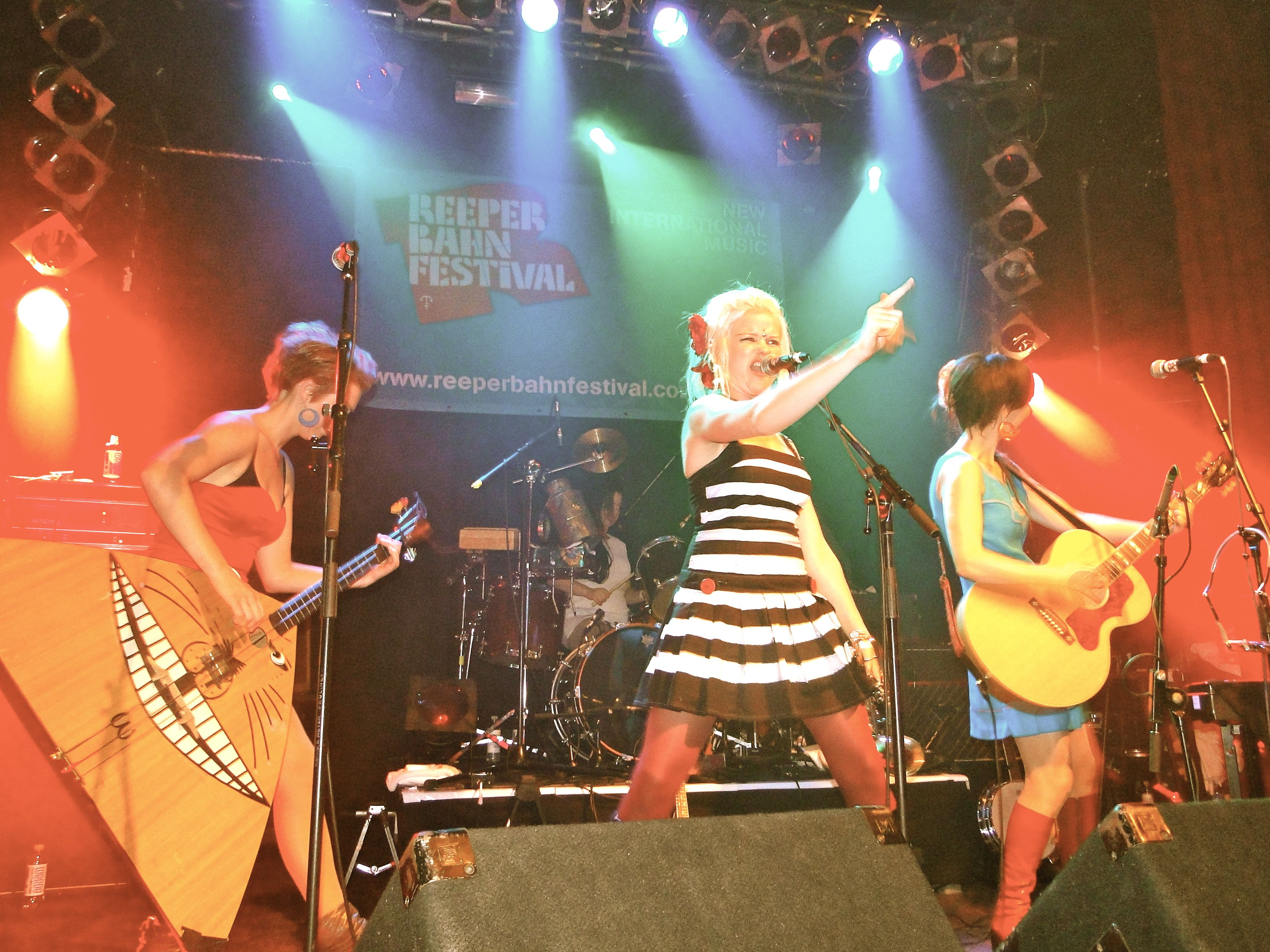
- Katzenjammer performing in Hamburg, Germany in 2009
- Studio albums: 3
- Extended plays: 1
- Live albums: 1
- Singles: 10
- Video albums: 1
- Music videos: 6
- Other appearances: 2

The discography of Norwegian band Katzenjammer consists of three studio albums, one live album, one extended play, nine singles, one video album and six music videos. Katzenjammer was founded in 2007 by Anne Marit Bergheim, Marianne Sveen, Solveig Heilo and Turid Jørgensen while studying at a private music school in Oslo, Norway.

Katzenjammer worked extensively with composer Mats Rybø in recording their debut studio album, Le Pop, which was released in September 2008. The album reached number nine in Norway and number 71 in the Netherlands. It produced four singles, but they failed to chart worldwide. In 2008, Le Pop was nominated for a Norwegian Spellemannprisen award for Best Debut Album of the Year.

A Kiss Before You Go, the band's second studio album, was released in September 2011. A mixture of folk, cabaret, and rock music, the album peaked at number six in Norway. the album achieved chart success in other European territories, reaching number seven in Germany and 33 in Austria. A Kiss Before You Go was certified gold by the Bundesverband Musikindustrie (BWMI). The album's lead single, "I Will Dance (When I Walk Away)", was a minor hit in Germany, peaking at number 32. A Kiss Before You Go: Live in Hamburg, a live album, and its companion video album followed in 2012.

== Albums ==
=== Studio albums ===
List of studio albums, with selected chart positions and certifications
| Title | Album details | Peak chart positions | | | | | Certifications |
| Title | Album details | NOR | AUT | GER | NL | SWI | Certifications |
|---|---|---|---|---|---|---|---|
| Le Pop | Released: 29 September 2008 (NOR); Labels: Propeller, Nettwerk (PRR16); Formats: CD, DD | 9 | — | — | 71 | — | |
| A Kiss Before You Go | Released: 7 September 2011 (GER); Labels: Propeller, Universal (PRR34); Formats: CD, DD, LP | 6 | 36 | 7 | 41 | 33 | BWMI: Gold |
| Rockland | Released: 16 January 2015 (GER) | 30 | 36 | 5 | — | 64 | — |
"—" denotes items which were not released in that country or failed to chart.

=== Live albums ===
List of live albums
| Title | Album details |
|---|---|
| A Kiss Before You Go: Live in Hamburg | Released: 25 May 2012 (GER); Label: Universal (0602537034291); Formats: CD, DD |

=== Extended plays ===
List of extended plays
| Title | Album details |
|---|---|
| Auf den Dächern: Katzenjammer (Live bei tape.tv) | Released: 9 December 2011 (GER); Label: Universal; Format: DD |

== Singles ==
List of singles, with selected chart positions, showing year released and album name
| Title | Year | Peak chart positions | Album |
| Title | Year | GER | Album |
|---|---|---|---|
| "Play My Darling, Play" | 2008 | — | Le Pop |
| "A Bar in Amsterdam" | 2009 | — | Le Pop |
| "Demon Kitty Rag" | 2009 | — | Le Pop |
| "Tea with Cinnamon" | 2010 | — | Le Pop |
| "Den Lengste Natten" (with Øystein Dolmen and Lisa Gansmoe) | 2010 | — | Non-album release |
| "I Will Dance (When I Walk Away)" | 2011 | 32 | A Kiss Before You Go |
| "Cocktails and Ruby Slippers" | 2011 | — | A Kiss Before You Go |
| "Rock-Paper-Scissors" | 2012 | — | A Kiss Before You Go |
| "Fairytale of New York" (featuring Ben Caplan) | 2012 | — | Non-album release |
| "Lady Gray" | 2014 | — | Rockland |
"—" denotes items which were not released in that country or failed to chart.

== Other appearances ==
List of non-single appearances, showing year released and album name
| Title | Year | Album | Notes |
|---|---|---|---|
| "Vi tenner våre lykter" | 2011 | Vi tenner våre lykter (Compilation album by Kronprinsparets Fond) | Cover of Bjarne Rønningen |
| "Den Uheldige Mannen" | 2012 | Vi har den ære. En hyllest til Thorbjørn Egner | Originally written by Thorbjørn Egner; originally composed by James William Elliott |

== Videography ==
=== Video albums ===
List of video albums
| Title | Album details |
|---|---|
| A Kiss Before You Go: Live in Hamburg | Released: 25 May 2012 (GER); Label: Universal; Format: DVD, Blu-ray |

=== Music videos ===
List of music videos, showing year released and director
| Title | Year | Director(s) |
|---|---|---|
| "A Bar in Amsterdam" | 2009 | Lasse Gjertsen |
| "Tea with Cinnamon" | 2010 | Unknown |
| "I Will Dance (When I Walk Away)" | 2011 | James Slater |
| "Rock-Paper-Scissors" | 2011 | James Slater |
| "Land of Confusion" | 2012 | James Slater |
| "Soviet Trumpeter" | 2012 | Natalie Heinlein |
| "Lady Grey" | 2015 | Unknown |
