= Solveig Heilo =

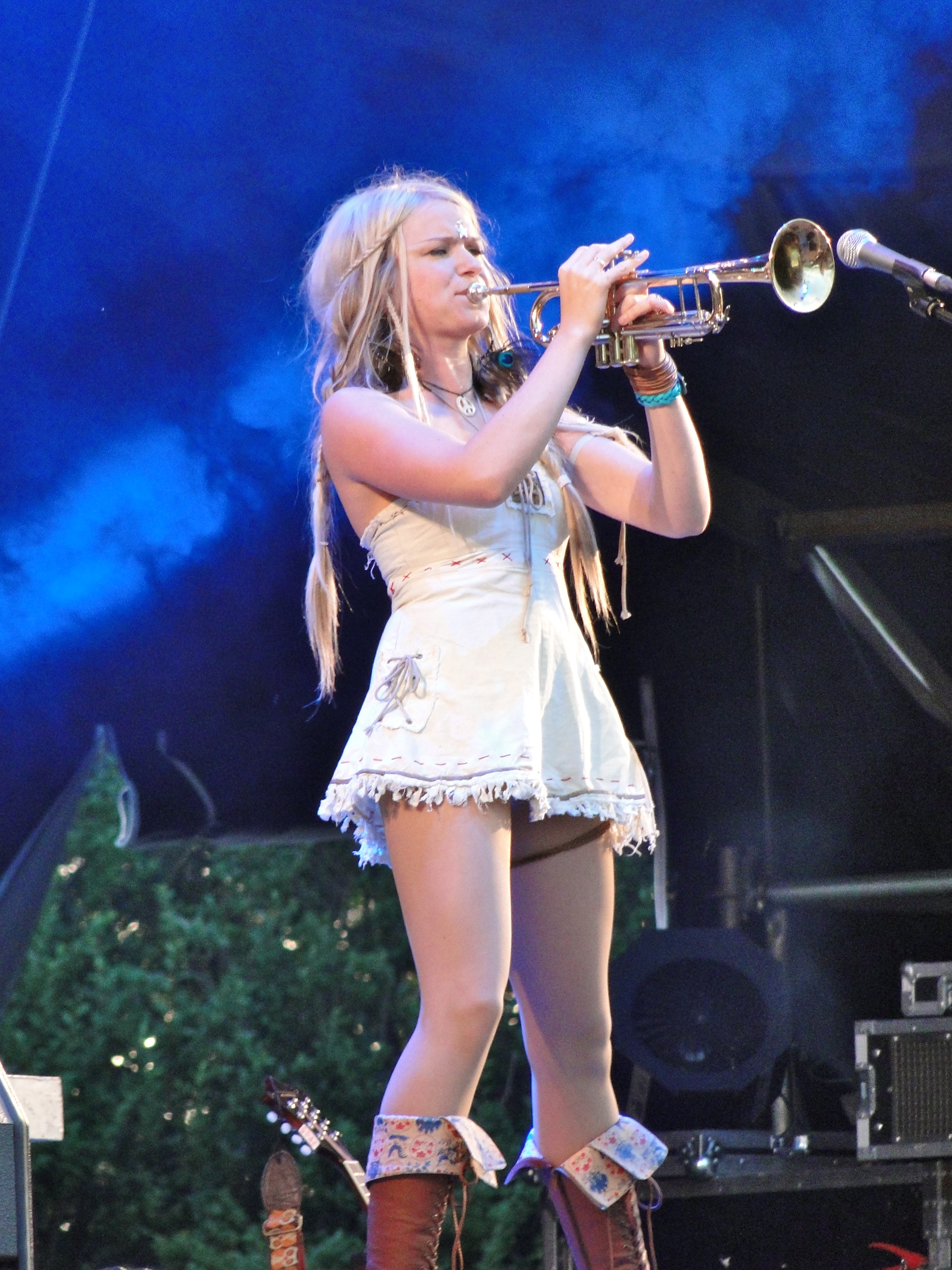
- Solveig Heilo performing in 2011.

Background information
- Also known as: Sol Heilo
- Born: Solveig Heilo; 24 December 1981 (age 44); Bærum, Norway
- Genres: Folk; rock; pop; bluegrass; classical; blues; soul; country; tribe; klezmer; electronica
- Occupations: Composer; artist; musician; music producer; arranger; designer; costume designer
- Instruments: Drums; trumpet; bass; guitar; melodic percussion; ukulele; domra; banjo; balalaika; zither; harp; flute; accordion; piano; harmonica; mandolin
- Labels: Propeller Recordings; Universal Music; Nettwerk
- Website: solheilo.com

Solveig Heilo (born 24 December 1981), known professionally as Sol Heilo, is a Norwegian composer, artist, musician, music producer, arranger, designer and costume designer. She is mostly known for the band Katzenjammer.

Sol works in different genres, such as folk, rock, pop, bluegrass, classical, blues, soul, country, tribe, klezmer and electronica. She is a multi-instrumentalist who plays drums, trumpet, bass, guitar, melodic percussion, ukulele, domra, banjo, balalaika, zither, harp, flute, accordion, piano, harmonica and mandolin.

== Early life ==
Sol grew up in Bærum, Norway as the youngest of four children. From their early years they all showed great aptitude for music, and learned to sing before learning to talk. She has written music with her brother Kristian Heilo, and her brother Øyvind Heilo is also musically active.

Their father Arne Heilo MD taught them how to play the piano, and their mother Bente Heilo sang with them every day. Sol showed little interest in sheet music, and using her high capacity for aural recall and pitch memory she quickly played anything by ear.

At the age of 7, Sol started playing percussion in a marching band, Haslum Skoles Jentekorps, and immediately showed skill and understanding of music. At the age of 12, she participated as a drummer in the Olympic torch relay for the 1994 Winter Olympics in Lillehammer, with a group of older percussionists from the Norwegian Academy of Music.

== Education ==
=== Music ===
From 1998 to 2000, Sol went to a musical high school, Rud Videregående skole, in Bærum, where she met her Katzenjammer companion Marianne Sveen. Sol brought her into the band a few years later.

After traveling the world she lived in Connecticut and played in Norwalk Symphony Orchestra as a percussionist for a short period of time.

She subsequently moved to Oslo and studied composing and studio production at Nordic Institute of Stage and Studio in Oslo (2003–2005). Katzenjammer was founded here with Sol's student companions Anne Marit Bergheim and Turid Jørgensen Honerud. She started to play guitar and a variety of other instruments in Katzenjammer such as banjo, accordion, mandolin, ukulele, bass, domra and contrabass balalaika. She also debuted as a singer.

Sol left the Nordic Institute of Stage and Studio with the highest grades of her class and was awarded St. Olavsprisen as Student of the Year.

=== Other ===
From 2000 to 2001, she studied photography and theatre at Buskerud Folkehøyskole (Norway).

== Work ==
=== Freelancing ===
After leaving Nordic Institute of Stage and Studio, Sol worked as a freelance musician with several artists, such as keyboard with Bertine Zetlitz, vocal participation and several instruments on the record Diggin Deep (2006) by HP Gundersen, trumpet with Westlife, vocals and drums on several Espen Lind and Stargate recordings, vocals and drums in Magnus Uggla's band, trumpet on Grand Island's record Boys and Brutes (2008), vocal on Vinni's song Mørkredd (2011), mandolin on Thomas Dybdahl's song Før Morgengry (2011), percussion and vocal with Odd Nordstoga and Kåre Vestrheim on a Norwegian Broadcasting Corporation (NRK) music video project.

In 2005 she built a recording studio at Propeller Recordings where she practised recording skills and also produced the first demo record of Katzenjammer together with Johan Wilhelm Schioldborg.

She has also written music for the Norwegian Broadcasting Corporation (NRK), where she is composer, copywriter, arranger, producer, technician, vocalist and musician.

In 2013, the Holmenkollen National Arena and Association for the Promotion of Skiing announced a song competition amongst renowned Norwegian bands and composers. They were looking for the new, official theme song, and several prominent Norwegian bands and composers submitted their songs. Together with Terje Borg she wrote the winner song of the competition, and Kollenbrølet (2013) is presently the official Holmenkollen theme song.

In 2012 and 2013 worked as a composer, arranger, musician, music producer, technician, visual designer and actor on the Worsøe theatre production Stilleben.

=== Katzenjammer ===
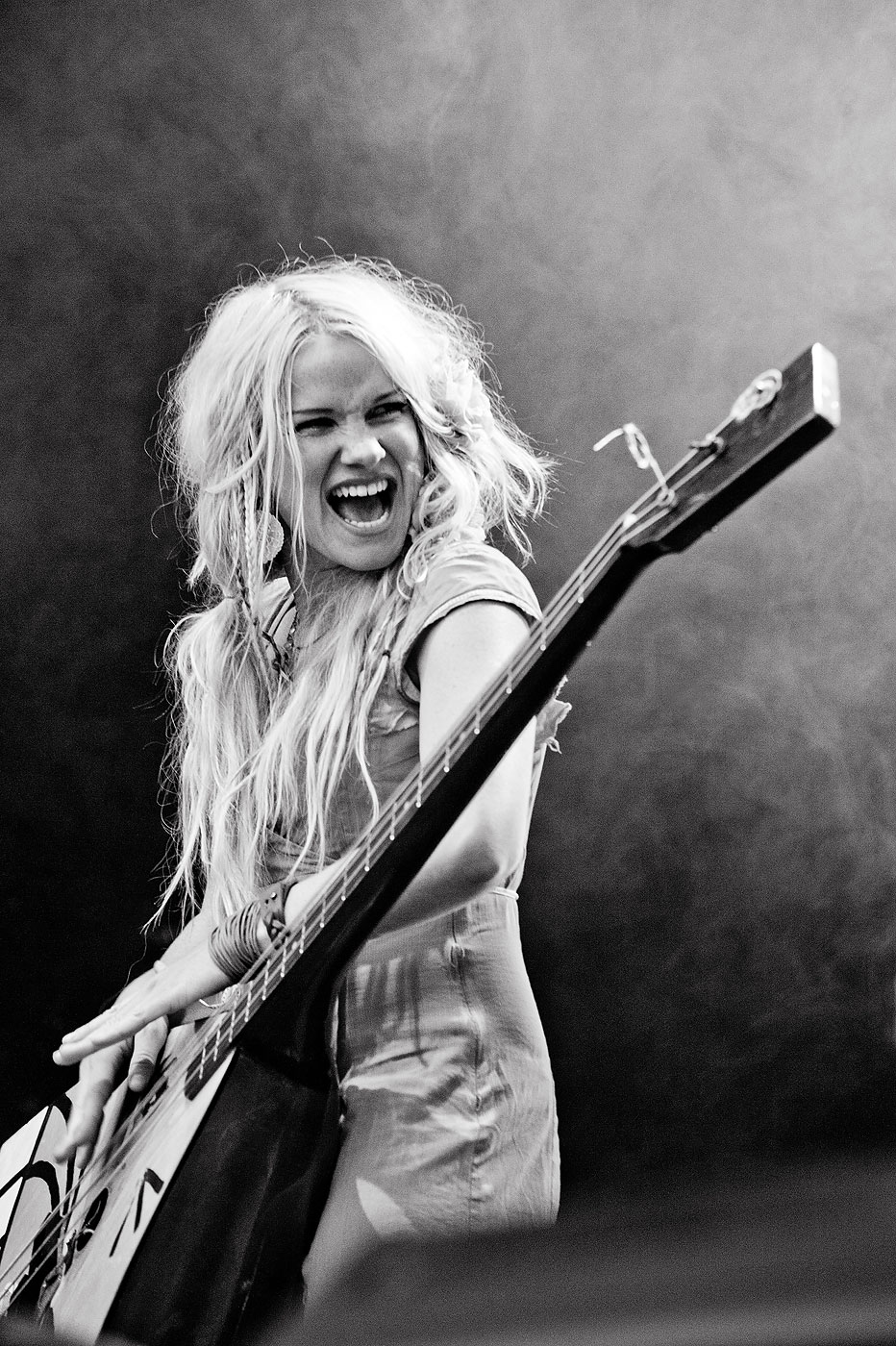
Sol Heilo with the Katzenjammer balalaika contra bass "Akerø"

She has been central in Katzenjammer's arrangements and compositions, and was co- producer on Katzenjammer's first and third album.

She was co- writer on the Katzenjammer singles Rock Paper Scissors and I Will Dance from the album A Kiss Before You Go (2011), and has written the two singles My Dear and Shine Like Neon Rays from the album Rockland (2015).

Together with Eivind Buene she is behind Katzenjammer's version of Bjørn Rønningen's Christmas song Vi Tenner Våre Lykter, which is the title track on the then-Norwegian Crown Prince Haakon and Crown Princess Mette-Marit’s Foundation's Christmas compilation from 2011.

Sol also made all the vocal arrangements for the Katzenjammer version of The Pogues' Fairytale of New York, where strings arrangement was made by Tormod Tvete Vik.

She is also the sole arranger of Katzenjammer's versions of the songs When You Wish Upon a Star, God Rest Ye Merry Gentlemen and White Christmas.

Touring, including bringing the arsenal of instruments needed for a typical Katzenjammer gig, is a major part of the work for Sol and the other band members. They have done up to 170 concerts a year, and are active in Europe, America and Australia.

=== Design Work ===
Sol did all the artwork on Katzenjammer's first album Le Pop (2008) together with her sister Kaja Heilo, and Sandrine Pagnoux. She also participated in the design on their second album A Kiss Before You Go (2011) together with Mathias Fossum and Heydays, and is fully behind all art work on Katzenjammer's third album Rockland (2015). She has also done most of Katzenjammer's general artwork for their line of merchandise, such as t -shirt designs, posters, stage designs, early web design and the design of their well known contra bass balalaika Akerø.

For twelve years Sol has designed and sewn her own clothes, and mostly all of her Katzenjammer stage outfits is from her self coutured collection. She has also sewn dresses as Katzenjammer merchandise.

=== Recent side projects ===
Sol has a side project with Unni Wilhelmsen and Hanne Mari Karlsen, where they play a variety of Wilhelmsen's and Sol's songs. The trio play 14 instruments together, and they all sing.

At the moment she plays with Magnus Grønneberg in his solo project with his daughter Hanna Maria. Sol plays drums and sings. She recently participated on CC Cowboys' last album Til det blir dag (2015) with vocals. She now works on a side project with Andreu Jacob, where they both are producers and musicians on some of Sol's recently written musical works.

In addition to her work with Katzenjammer, Heilo has released solo music under the name Sol Heilo, including her debut solo album Skinhorse Playground in October 2017.
