= Trond Bersu =

Norwegian drummer and producer

- Born: 4 January 1984 (age 42); Skjåk Municipality, Oppland
- Origin: Norway
- Genres: Electronica, pop, alternative, jazz
- Occupations: Musician, producer, composer
- Instruments: Drums, synth, programming =
- Label: Propeller Recordings
- Website: www.highasakite.no

Trond Bersu (born 4 January 1984 in Skjåk Municipality, Norway) is a Norwegian drummer and producer.

== Career ==
During his music studies on the jazz program at the Trondheim musikkonservatorium Bersu started the band PELbO together with fellow students Ine Hoem and Kristoffer Lo. Their self titled debut album was nominated for the 2010 Open class Spellemannprisen. The second album release was Days of Transcendence (2011).

In Trondheim, he also collaborated with another fellow student Ingrid Helene Håvik and later on when established in Oslo, they started the band Highasakite together. Their debut album All That Floats Will Rain (2012) was well received and was nominated for Newcomer of the Year at the 2012 Spellemannprisen. The next album Silent Treatment received Pop Group of the Year at the 2014 Spellemannprisen.

== Honors ==
- 2014: Spellemannprisen as This year's pop group for the album Silent Treatment
- 2016: Spellemannprisen as This year's pop group for the album Camp Echo

== Discography ==
With PELbO

- 2010: PELbO (Riot Factory)
- 2011: Days of Transcendence (Riot Factory)

With Machina

- 2011: So Much For Dancing (Øra Fonogram)

With Highasakite

- 2012: All That Floats Will Rain (Riot Factory)
- 2014: Silent Treatment (Propeller Recordings)
- 2016: Camp Echo (Propeller Recordings)
- 2018: Out of Order-single (Propeller Recordings)
- 2018: Elastic State of Mind-single (Producer and musician) (Propeller Recordings)
- 2019: Uranium Heart (Producer and musician)(Propeller Recordings)
- 2020: The Bare Romantic 1 & 2 (Producer and musician) (Propeller Recordings)

With Lydmor

- 2018: I Told You I´d Tell Them Our Story (Producer, musician and mix engineer) (Mermaid Records)

With Ine Hoem

- 2015: Angerville (Propeller Recordings)

=== Production/Songwriting credits ===
| Year | Artist | Title | Record label | Achievements |
|---|---|---|---|---|
| 2022 | Highasakite | Mother (Album) | Propeller Recordings | |
| 2021 | Lydmor | Go Slow But Go (Track on album) | Mermaid Records | |
| 2020 | Highasakite | The Bare Romantic Pt.2 (EP) | Propeller Recordings | |
| 2019 | Highasakite | Uranium Heart (Album) | Propeller Recordings | |
| 2019 | Highasakite/SEEB | Free To Go (Single) | Universal Music | |
| 2019 | Highasakite | The Bare Romantic Pt.1 (EP) | Propeller Recordings | |
| 2018 | Highasakite | Elastic State of Mind (Single) | Propeller Recordings | |
| 2018 | Lydmor | I Told You I'd Tell Them Our Story (Album) | Mermaid Records | |
