= Silent Treatment (Highasakite album) =

Studio album by Highasakite
- Released: February 2014
- Genre: Indie pop, indie rock
- Length: 44:56
- Label: Propeller Recordings, Universal Music
- Producer: Kåre Christoffer Vestrheim

Highasakite chronology
| All That Floats Will Rain (2012) | Silent Treatment (2014) | Camp Echo (2016) |

Silent Treatment is first full-length album, and second in total, released by Norwegian indie pop group Highasakite.

Upon release the album received rave reviews, with Norwegian newspaper Dagbladet lauding it, giving Highasakite their second consecutive 6/6 from the newspaper; Verdens Gang was equally enthusiastic, giving it a 5/6.

For the album, Highasakite won the "Pop Group of the Year Award" at the Norwegian equivalent of the Grammy Awards, Spellemannprisen; additionally, Håvik was nominated in the categories "Composer of the Year" and "Writer of the Year", winning the former. The same year the band won the Bendiksen Award, an award and grant given to up-and-coming artists to help develop their talent, winning 100,000 Norwegian kroner.

The album hit number one and spent more than 108 weeks on the Norwegian music chart, VG-lista Topp 40, setting a record in doing so.

== Track listing ==
All tracks are written by Ingrid Helene Håvik

| No. | Title | Length |
|---|---|---|
| 1. | "Lover, Where Do You Live?" | 5:03 |
| 2. | "Since Last Wednesday" | 3:56 |
| 3. | "Leaving No Traces" | 4:21 |
| 4. | "Hiroshima" | 6:03 |
| 5. | "My Only Crime" | 2:54 |
| 6. | "I, The Hand Grenade" | 6:17 |
| 7. | "Darth Vader" | 3:29 |
| 8. | "Iran" | 4:06 |
| 9. | "The Man On The Ferry" | 4:06 |
| 10. | "Science & Blood Tests" | 14:14 |
