= Bendiksen Award =

Norwegian music award

The Bendiksen Award, or Bendiksenprisen in Norwegian, is a music award granted by the Norwegian Ministry of Culture and awarded by the Norwegian Artists' Association, GramArt. The award was established in 2009. The Award is meant to contribute to the development of talent in Norwegian pop music industry, and "be a contribution to an artist that already has established a career, that either has one commercial release or conduct concert performances of a certain scale". The winner receives 100,000 Norwegian kroner.

The award is named after Norwegian singer Arne Bendiksen.

== Awards ==
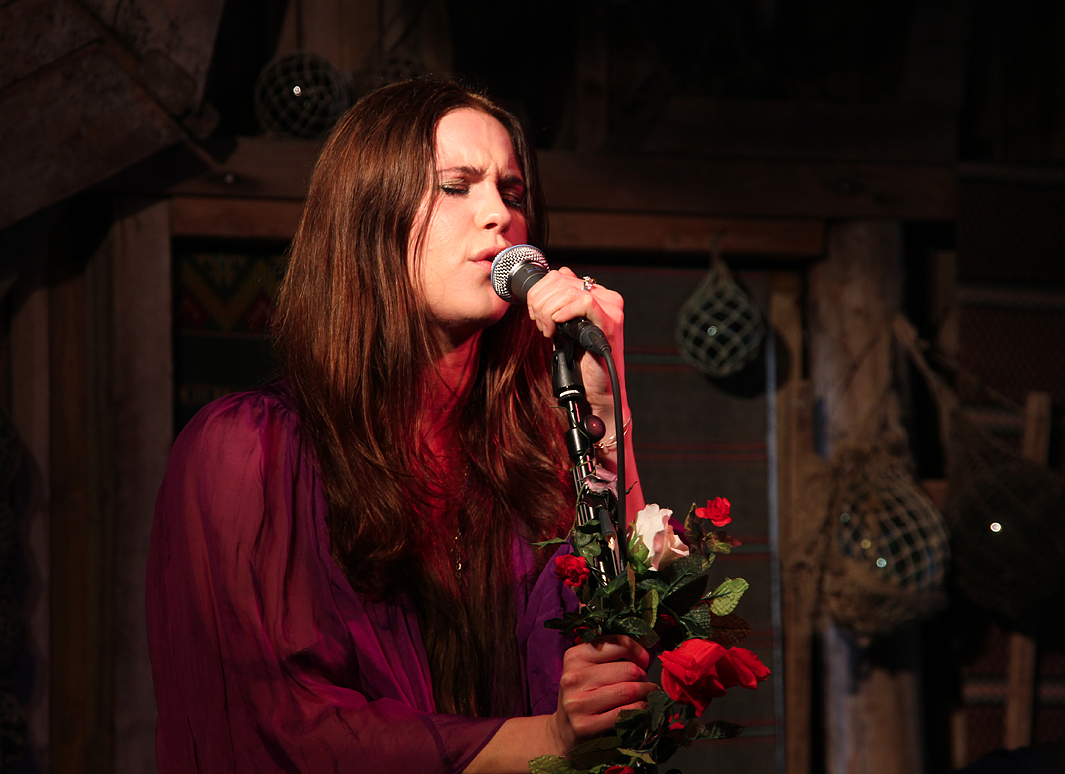
Ida Jenshus won the Award in 2011

- 2010: Karpe Diem. Nominees: Susanne Sundfør, Marit Larsen, Shining and Donkeyboy.
- 2011: Ida Jenshus. Nominees: Lars Vaular, Thom Hell, Kvelertak and Montée.
- 2012: Stein Torleif Bjella. Nominees: Katzenjammer, Jarle Bernhoft, LidoLido and Donkeyboy.
- 2013: Monica Heldal. Nominees: LidoLido, Arve Henriksen, Frida Amundsen and Violet Road.
- 2014: Highasakite. Nominees: Gabrielle, Oslo Ess, Bendik Brænne and Frida Ånnevik
- 2015: Spidergawd. Nominees: Aurora, Cashmere Cat, Ine Hoem and OnklP & De Fjerne Slektningene.
- 2016: Bow To Each Other. Nominees: Arne Hurlen (Postgirobygget), Bjørn Gunnar Sando (Hellbillies), Tove Bøygard Ivar S. Peersen (Enslaved), Knut Schreiner, Anne Lise Frøkedal, Karin Park og Sven Garås, Morten Skaget, and Hanne Sørvaag.
- 2017: Honningbarna. Nominees: Frida Ånnevik, Daniel Kvammen, Torgeir Waldemar and Årabrot.
- 2018: Ola Kvernberg. Nominees: Susanne Sundfør, Ulver, Sassy 009 and Erlend Ropstad.
- 2019: Ivan Ave. Nominees: Boy Pablo, GURLS, Thea Hjelmeland and Pom Poko.
- 2020: Emilie Nicolas. Nominees: Valkyrien Allstars, Fieh, Kristian Kristensen and Jakob Ogawa
- 2021: Bokassa. Nominees: SKAAR, Musti, Bendik Baksaas and Bendik
- 2022: Fieh. Nominees: Gabrielle, Bendik Giske, Isák and Vuyo.
- 2023: Ary. Nominees: Beharie, Cezinando, SKAAR and Tøyen Holding
