= Try Not to Freak Out =

Studio album by Sløtface
- Released: 15 September 2017
- Genres: Punk pop; punk rock; alternative pop
- Length: 32:13
- Label: Propeller Recordings
- Producer: Dan Austin

Sløtface chronology
Empire Records (2016)	Try Not to Freak Out (2017)	Sorry for the Late Reply (2020)

Try Not to Freak Out is the debut album of the Norwegian punk pop band Sløtface. Just like their former EPs, this release includes clear political and feminist statements.

== Critical reception ==
Professional ratings
Aggregate scores
Source	Rating
AnyDecentMusic?	7.3/10
Metacritic	77/100
Review scores
Source	Rating
NRK P3	4/6 stars
NME	4/5 stars
Dagsavisen	5/6 stars
Paste	7.4/10

Try Not to Freak Out was met with generally favourable reviews from music critics. At Metacritic, which assigns a normalized rating out of 100 to reviews from mainstream publications, the album received an average score of 77, based on eleven reviews. The aggregator AnyDecentMusic? has the critical consensus of the album at a 7.3 out of 10, also based on fifteen reviews.

== Track listing ==
No.	Title	Length
1.	"Magazine"	2:38
2.	"Galaxies"	3:31
3.	"Pitted"	2:28
4.	"Sun Bleached"	2:45
5.	"Pools"	2:45
6.	"Night Guilt"	3:11
7.	"Try"	2:59
8.	"Nancy Drew"	3:15
9.	"Slumber"	5:32
10.	"It's Coming to a Point"	0:18
11.	"Backyard"	2:51
Total length:		32:13

== Personnel ==
- Haley Shea – vocals
- Tor-Arne Vikingstad – guitars
- Halvard Skeie Wiencke – percussion
- Lasse Lokøy – bass
- Dan Austin – producer
