= Sorry for the Late Reply =

Studio album by Sløtface
- Released: January 31, 2020
- Genre: Pop-punk
- Label: Propeller Recordings
- Producer: Odd Martin Skålnes

Sløtface chronology
| Try Not to Freak Out (2017) | Sorry for the Late Reply (2020) |

Professional ratings
Review scores
| Source | Rating |
|---|---|
| DIY | 4.5/5 stars |
| Dork | 4/5 stars |
| Exclaim! | 8/10 |
| Kerrang! | 4/5 |
| NME | 4/5 stars |
| musicOMH | 4/5 stars |
| The Line of Best Fit | 6/10 |
| Tom Hull | B+ |
| Under the Radar | 7.5/10 stars |

Sorry for the Late Reply is the second studio album by Norwegian pop-punk band Sløtface. It was released on 31 January 2020 via Propeller Recordings. Production was handled by Odd Martin Skålnes. The album was met with generally favourable reviews from music critics.

In 2018, a year after the band's debut full-length album Try Not to Freak Out has been released, Sløtface drummer Halvard Skeie Wiencke has announced his departure from the band. He was replaced with Nils Jørgen Nilsen of Honningbarna. On 13 June 2022, the band announced the departure of Lasse Lokøy and Tor-Arne Vikingstad.

== Track listing ==
All tracks are written by Haley Shea, Tor-Arne Vikingstad, Lasse Lokøy, Nils Jørgen Nilsen and Odd Martin Skålnes..

| No. | Title | Length |
|---|---|---|
| 1. | "S.U.C.C.E.S.S." | 2:41 |
| 2. | "Telepathetic" | 3:47 |
| 3. | "Stuff" | 3:51 |
| 4. | "Luminous" | 3:49 |
| 5. | "Tap the Pack" | 2:27 |
| 6. | "New Year, New Me" | 2:30 |
| 7. | "Passport" | 2:47 |
| 8. | "Crying in Amsterdam" | 2:09 |
| 9. | "Laughing at Funerals" | 3:59 |
| 10. | "Static" | 4:12 |
| 11. | "Sorry for the Late Reply (Intro)" | 0:34 |
| 12. | "Sink or Swim" | 4:22 |
| 13. | "Crying in Amsterdam (Reprise)" | 2:39 |
