= Bersu =

Bersu is a surname. Notable people with the surname include:

- Gerhard Bersu (1889–1964), German archaeologist
- Trond Bersu (born 1984), Norwegian drummer and producer
