= Katzenjammer =

Katzenjammer may refer to:

- Katzenjammer (band), a Norwegian pop/folk band
- Katzenjammer Kabarett, a French rock band
- The Katzenjammer Kids, an American comic strip
- Fran Katzenjammer, a fictional character in the British sitcom Black Books
- "Katzenjammer", a song by Big Talk
- "Katzenjammer", a song by Kyuss on the album Wretch
- Katzenjammer Cave, in the Makapansgat paleontological site
- Worbey & Farrell, previously known as Katzenjammer, a British piano musical comedy duo
- The Katzenjammer Kids, a short-lived band founded by Randy Rhoads
- Fred Katz and His Jammers, a 1959 album by Fred Katz
- "Katzenjammer," a 2009 album by Will Toledo as Nervous Young Men
