= Le Pop =

Studio album by Katzenjammer
- Released: September 29, 2008
- Recorded: 2008
- Genre: Pop rock, dark cabaret, alternative
- Label: Propeller, Nettwerk
- Producer: Kåre Chr. Vestrheim, Mike Hartung, Hans Petter Gundersen

Katzenjammer chronology
Le Pop (2008)	A Kiss Before You Go (2011)

Singles from Le Pop
- 1. "Play My Darling, Play" Released: August 4, 2008; 2. "A Bar in Amsterdam" Released: June 2, 2009; 3. "Demon Kitty Rag" Released: June 7, 2009; 4. "Tea with Cinnamon" Released: March 22, 2010

Le Pop is the debut studio album by Norwegian band Katzenjammer. It was released on September 29, 2008, by Propeller Recordings.

== Reception ==
=== Critical reception ===
Professional ratings
Review scores
Source	Rating
PopMatters	8/10 stars
The Washington Post	(favorable)

The album received generally favorable reviews. Adrien Begrand from PopMatters rated Le Pop eight out of ten stars and wrote that its "songs all play to [Katzenjammer's] strengths and, most importantly, are all instantly memorable." In an additional review for PopMatters, Mike Schiller called Le Pop a "great album." Furthermore, he wrote that the album would have the listener "singing along" since its songs are "engrossing and appealing". In a review for The Washington Post, Catherine P. Lewis wrote that the album "never lacks energy" and called it a "charmingly quirky collection of songs." She did, however, write that Katzenjammer's "exuberance [occasionally] teeters on the brink of unbridled chaos," citing the album's title track, which she said "sounds like a circus band gone rogue."

Le Pop was nominated for a Spellemannprisen award for Best Debut Album of the Year in 2008.

=== Chart performance ===
In Norway, Le Pop debuted at number nine on the VG-lista albums chart. It remained on the chart for three weeks. The album reached number eighty-six in the Netherlands in October 2009. The revised version of Le Pop reached number seventy-one and remained on the albums chart for two weeks in August 2010.

== Track listing ==
Songs written and composed by Mats Rybø. All songs arranged by Katzenjammer.

No.	Title	Lead vocals	Length
1.	"Overture"	Instrumental	1:04
2.	"A Bar in Amsterdam"	Heilo	3:28
3.	"Tea With Cinnamon"	Sveen	3:53
4.	"Hey Ho on the Devil's Back"	Sveen	3:47
5.	"Virginia Clemm"	Heilo	4:32
6.	"Le Pop"	Jørgensen	2:21
7.	"Der Kapitän"	Instrumental	2:44
8.	"Wading in Deeper"	Bergheim, Heilo, and Sveen	4:03
9.	"Play My Darling, Play"	Bergheim	3:47
10.	"To the Sea"	Bergheim	2:27
11.	"Mother Superior"	Jørgensen	5:38
12.	"Ain't No Thang"	Sveen	2:47

=== Revised edition ===
No.	Title	Lead vocals	Length
1.	"Overture"	Instrumental	1:04
2.	"A Bar in Amsterdam"	Heilo	3:28
3.	"Demon Kitty Rag"	Sveen	4:30
4.	"Tea With Cinnamon"	Sveen	3:53
5.	"Hey Ho on the Devil's Back"	Sveen	3:47
6.	"Wading in Deeper"	Bergheim, Heilo, and Sveen	4:21
7.	"Le Pop"	Jørgensen	2:21
8.	"Der Kapitän"	Instrumental	2:44
9.	"Virginia Clemm"	Heilo	4:17
10.	"Play My Darling, Play"	Bergheim	3:47
11.	"To the Sea"	Bergheim	2:27
12.	"Mother Superior"	Jørgensen	5:38
13.	"Ain't No Thang"	Sveen	2:47

== Personnel ==
Credits adapted from Le Pop liner notes.

- Anne Marit Bergheim – vocals, instruments
- Silje Katrine Gotaas – cello
- Hans Petter Gundersen – production
- Mike Hartung – production, engineering, mastering
- Solveig Heilo – vocals, instruments
- Hundenklunke – background vocals
- Turid Jørgensen – vocals, instruments
- Gunnhild Mathea – violin
- Odd Nordstoga – accordion
- Gjertrud Økland – trumpet violin, violin
- Hasse Rosbach – co-production, engineering assistant
- Marianne Sveen – vocals, instruments
- Jørgen Sandvik – sitar, banjo
- Kåre Chr. Vestrheim – production, engineering, instruments

== Charts ==
Chart (2008–10)	Peak position
Dutch Albums Chart	71
Norwegian Albums Chart	9

== Release history ==
Region	Date	Format	Label
Norway	September 29, 2008	CD, digital download	Propeller
United Kingdom	August 24, 2009	CD, digital download	Nettwerk
United States	June 29, 2010	CD, digital download	Nettwerk
