= Frøkedal =

Anne Lise Frøkedal
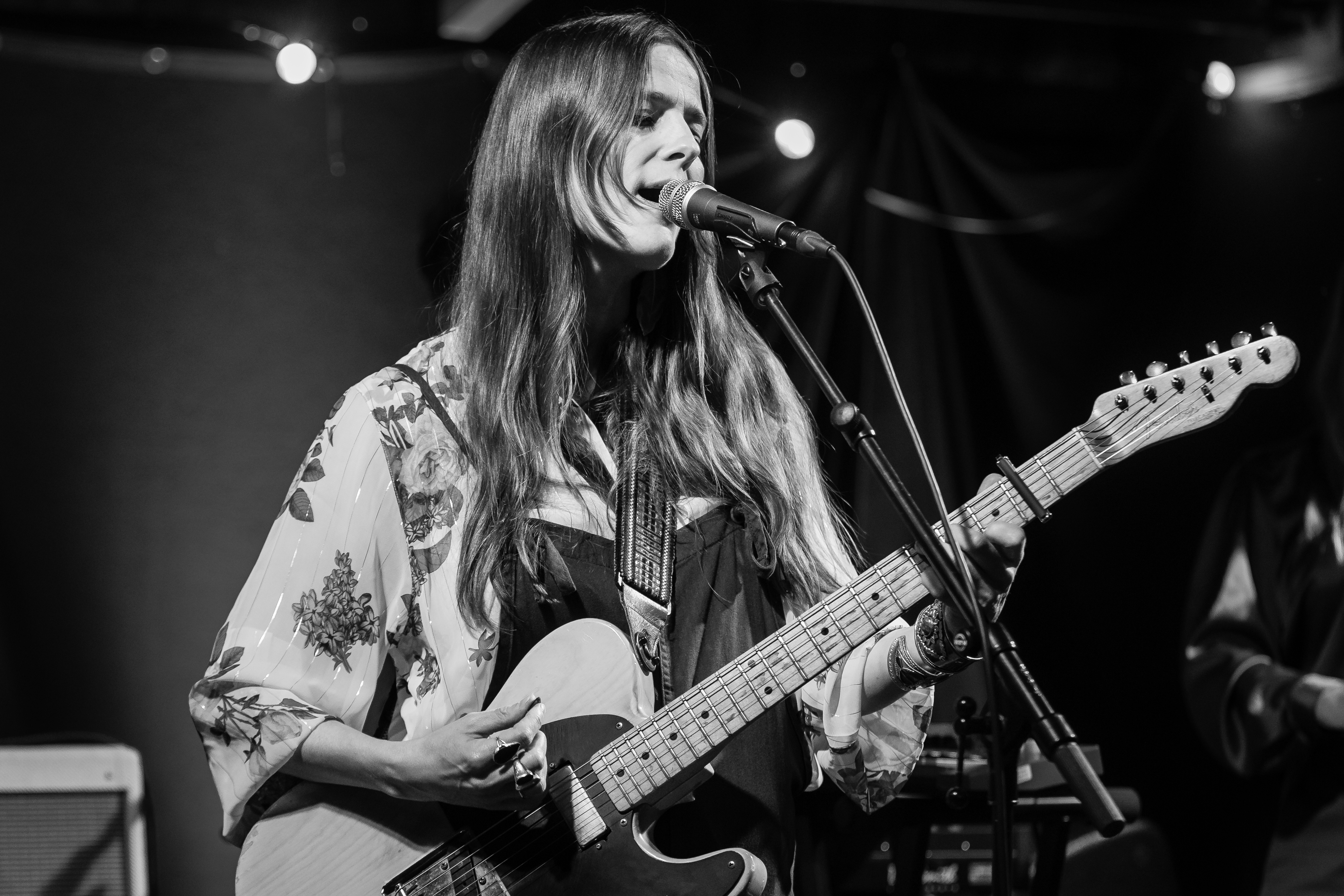
- Anne Lise Frøkedal performing in 2023; Photo: Tore Sætre

Background information
- Also known as: Frøkedal
- Born: 19 July 1981 (age 45)
- Origin: Etne Municipality, Norway
- Genres: Folk, Folk-pop, Singer-Songwriter
- Instruments: Vocals, Guitar
- Years active: 2006–present
- Label: Propeller Recordings
- Website: frokedal.com

Anne Lise Frøkedal known by her stage name Frøkedal is a folk-pop, singer-songwriter from Norway.

Previously known as a member of acclaimed Norwegian bands Harry's Gym and I Was A King, in 2015 she debuted as a solo artist. Releasing a series of singles and an EP in 2015, she released her debut album Hold On Dreamer in 2016. The album was later nominated for a Spellemannprisen - also known as the Norwegian Grammys - for best Indie Album Of The Year 2017.

In 2017, Frøkedal announced her return with the release of singles Stranger, and double single LTF/Cracks.

Frøkedal released her second album, 'How We Made It' on August 31, 2018. It received support from The 405, CLASH Magazine and The Line of Best Fit.

== Discography ==
=== Albums ===
Title	Release details
Flora	Released: 14 May 2021; Label: Fugleben Records / Fysisk Format; Format: Digital download, CD, vinyl
Hold On Dreamer	Released: 26 June 2016; Label: Propeller Recordings; Format: Digital download, CD, vinyl
How We Made It	Released: 31 August 2018; Label: Propeller Recordings; Format: Digital download, CD, vinyl

=== Extended plays ===
Title	Release details
I See You	Released: 4 September 2015; Label: Propeller Recordings; Format: Digital download, CD

=== Singles ===
Year	Title	Album
2015	Surfers	I See You EP
2016	Kid	Hold On Dreamer LP
2016	The Sign	Hold On Dreamer LP
2017	Stranger	Stranger Single
2017	LTF/Cracks	LTF/Cracks Single
2018	Believe	How We Made It Album
2018	I Don't Care	How We Made It Album
2018	Treehouse	How We Made It Album
2018	David	How We Made It Album
