= A Kiss Before You Go: Live in Hamburg =

Live album by Katzenjammer
- Released: May 25, 2012
- Genres: Pop rock, cabaret, alternative
- Label: Universal Music Group

Katzenjammer chronology
A Kiss Before You Go (2011)	A Kiss Before You Go: Live in Hamburg (2012)	Rockland (2015)

A Kiss Before You Go: Live in Hamburg is the first live album by Norwegian band Katzenjammer. It was released on May 25, 2012 by the Universal Music Group. It was recorded at Große Freiheit 36 during the Hamburg, Germany dates of the tour, and was released in both CD and DVD format. The DVD contains the concert performance and music videos, and the CD includes nineteen songs.

== Background ==
The album was recorded at Große Freiheit 36 in November 2011, during the Hamburg stop of their tour, which was promoting their 2011 studio album A Kiss Before You Go. It was released in both DVD and CD formats. The DVD release consists of the full nineteen song set list and promotional music videos, while the CD features the nineteen songs from the DVD.

== Track listing ==
=== CD ===
No.	Title	Writer(s)	Length
1.	"A Kiss Before You Go"	Mats Rybø, Anne Marit Bergheim	1:18
2.	"Ouch!"	Rybø	3:09
3.	"Demon Kitty Rag"	Rybø	3:59
4.	"I Will Dance (When I Walk Away)"	Rybø	3:44
5.	"To the Sea"	Rybø	2:22
6.	"Rock-Paper-Scissors"	Katzenjammer, Robert Ellis Orral	4:06
7.	"Lady Marlene"	Solveig Heilo	4:37
8.	"Cherry Pie"	Marianne Sveen, Mike Hartung	3:03
9.	"Mother Superior"	Rybø	4:07
10.	"Land of Confusion"	Mike Rutherford, Tony Banks, Phil Collins	3:41
11.	"Loathsome M"	Rybø	2:43
12.	"Cocktails and Ruby Slippers"	Rybø	4:01
13.	"A Bar in Amsterdam"	Rybø	2:56
14.	"Hey Ho on the Devil's Back"	Rybø	5:27
15.	"Der Kapitän"	Rybø	2:49
16.	"Le Pop"	Rybø	2:39
17.	"God's Great Dust Storm"	Rybø	4:06
18.	"Ain't No Thang"	Rybø	6:53
19.	"Gypsy Flee"	Sveen	2:56

=== DVD ===
No.	Title	Writer(s)	Length
1.	"A Kiss Before You Go"	Rybø, Bergheim	1:18
2.	"Ouch!"	Rybø	3:09
3.	"Demon Kitty Rag"	Rybø	3:59
4.	"I Will Dance (When I Walk Away)"	Rybø	3:44
5.	"To the Sea"	Rybø	2:22
6.	"Rock-Paper-Scissors"	Katzenjammer, Orral	4:06
7.	"Lady Marlene"	Heilo	4:37
8.	"Cherry Pie"	Sveen, Hartung	3:03
9.	"Mother Superior"	Rybø	4:07
10.	"Land of Confusion"	Rutherford, Banks, Collins	3:41
11.	"Loathsome M"	Rybø	2:43
12.	"Cocktails and Ruby Slippers"	Rybø	4:01
13.	"A Bar in Amsterdam"	Rybø	2:56
14.	"Hey Ho on the Devil's Back"	Rybø	5:27
15.	"Der Kapitän"	Rybø	2:49
16.	"Le Pop"	Rybø	2:39
17.	"God's Great Dust Storm"	Rybø	4:06
18.	"Ain't No Thang"	Rybø	6:53
19.	"Gypsy Flee"	Sveen	2:56

Bonus features
No.	Title	Length
20.	"I Will Dance (When I Walk Away)" (Music video)
21.	"Rock-Paper-Scissors" (Music video)
22.	"Land of Confusion" (Music video)
23.	"I Will Dance (When I Walk Away)" (Making of)
24.	"Land of Confusion" (Making of)
25.	"I Will Dance (When I Walk Away)" (Studio session)
26.	"Rock-Paper-Scissors" (Studio session)
27.	"Land of Confusion" (Studio session)

== Release history ==
Region(s)	Date	Format(s)	Label
Austria, Germany, Switzerland	May 2, 2012	CD+DVD, Blu-ray, digital download	Universal
