= Marte Wulff =

Norwegian singer-songwriter

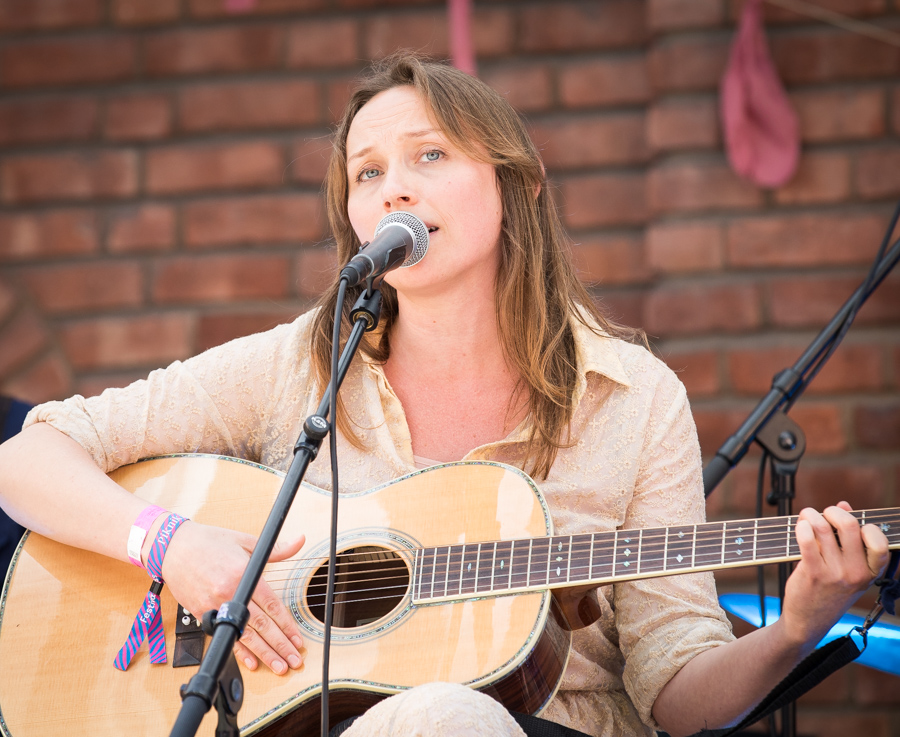

Background information
- Born: Marte Wulff
- Origin: Kristiansand, Norway
- Genres: Pop; Indie; Folk
- Instruments: Vocals; Piano; Guitar
- Label: It´s Definitely Records
- Website: martewulff.com

Marte Wulff is a Norwegian singer-songwriter.

== Discography ==
=== Albums ===
Album	Singles
Jacket: Released: 2006	Singles Released: "Carousel Of Love"; "Run"; "Lady"
Safety Pins: Released: February 2007	Singles Released: "Accident"
