= PELbO =

Norwegian musical trio

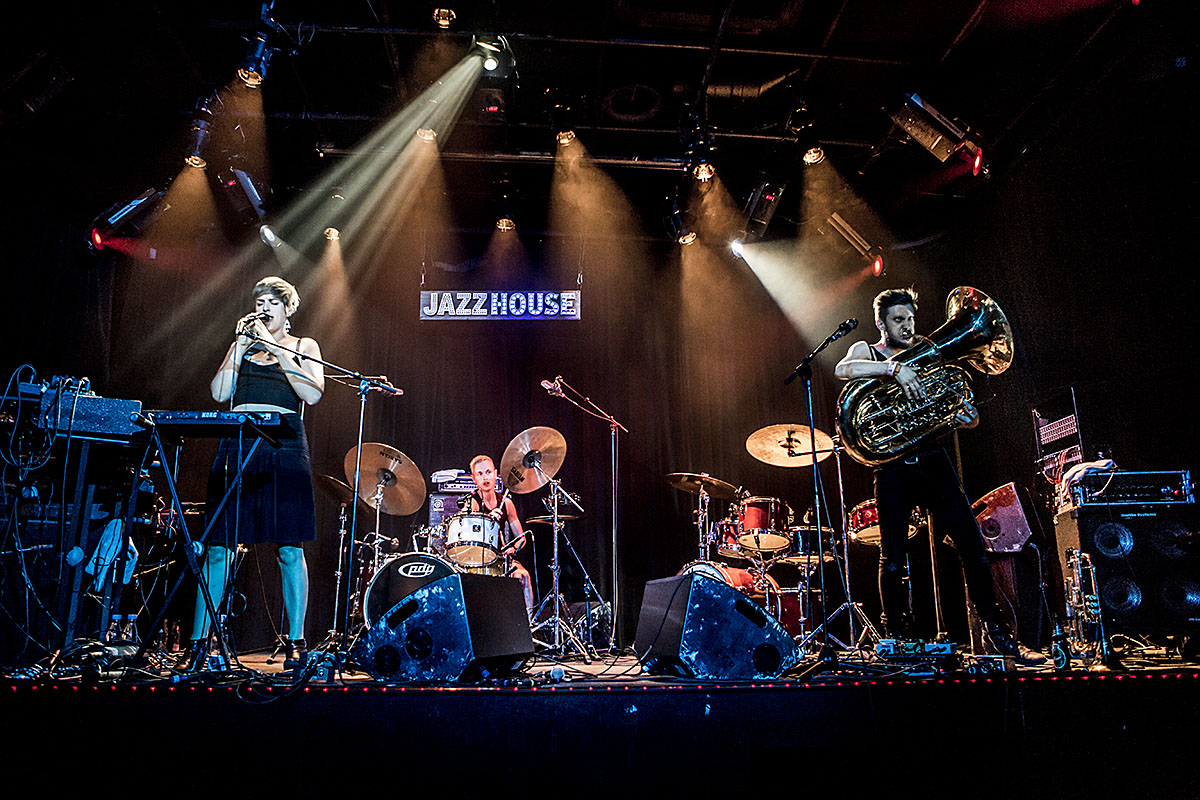
- (Photo by Kim Matthäi Leland)

Background information
- Origin: Trondheim, Norway
- Genres: Jazz; Electronica; Experimental rock
- Years active: 2006–present
- Labels: Rhinoprod
- Members: Ine Hoem; Kristoffer Lo; Trond Bersu

PELbO (initiated 2006 in Trondheim) is a Norwegian electronica/jazz trio.

== Biography ==
The band's debut albumet PELbO (2010), was nominated for the 2010 Open class Spellemannprisen.

The trio was named NTNU-ambassadør in 2011, a title that is awarded a jazz artist or ensemble annually, for in an outstanding manner to serve as ambassador for NTNU and the jazz scene in Trondheim.

== Band members ==
- Ine Hoem - vocals, electronics
- Kristoffer Lo - tuba, electronics, vocals
- Trond Bersu - drums
