= Kristoffer Lo =

Norwegian jazz musician and composer (born 1985)

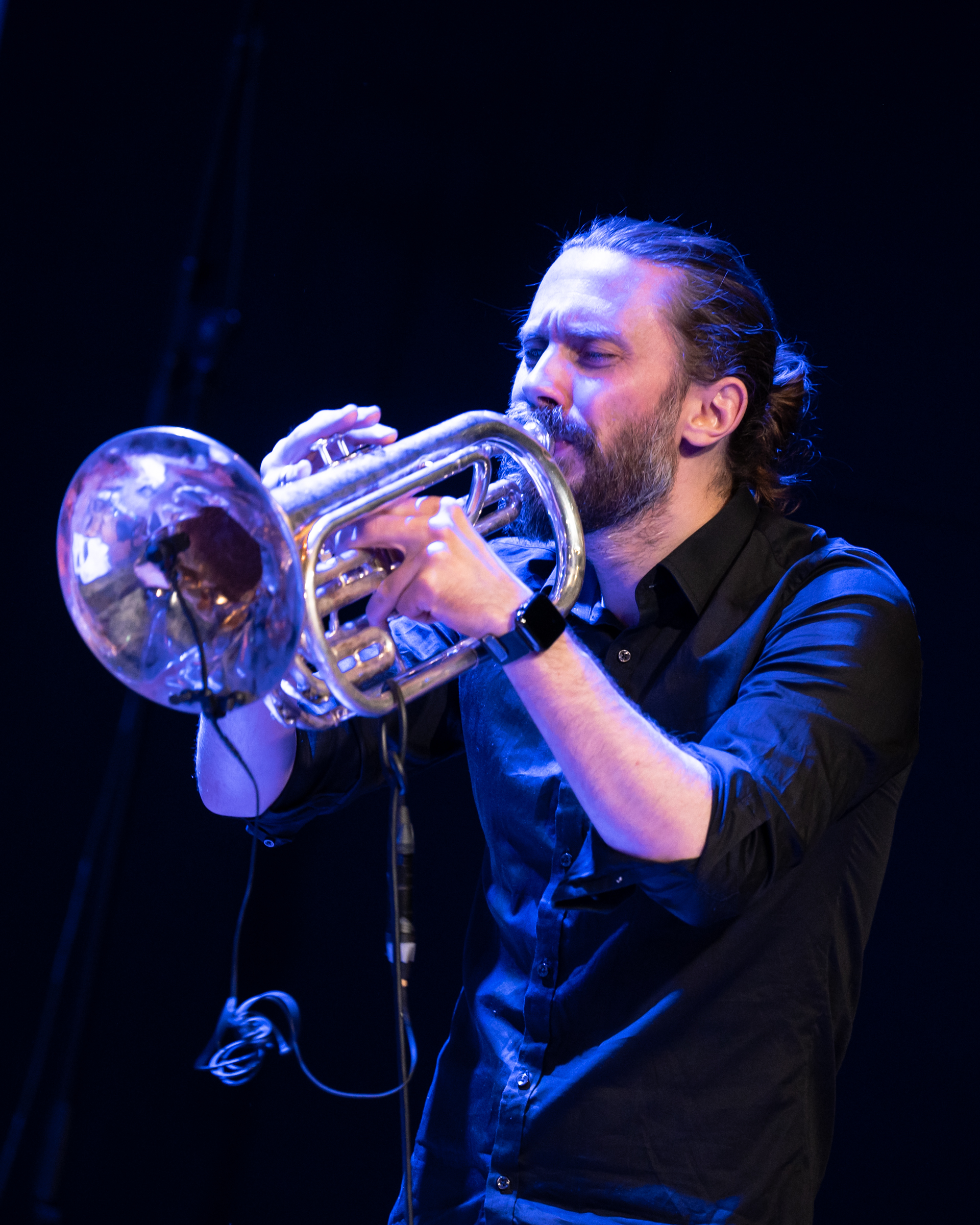
- Performing with Mona Krogstad at Kongsberg Jazzfestival 2024

Background information
- Born: 19 February 1985 (age 41); Moss, Østfold
- Origin: Norway
- Genres: Jazz
- Occupations: Musician, composer
- Instruments: Tuba, flugabone, guitar, keyboards
- Labels: Gigafon Records; Propellor; Sofa Music
- Website: www.kristofferlo.com

Kristoffer Lo (born 19 February 1985 in Moss, Norway) is a Norwegian jazz musician (tuba, flugabone, guitar, keyboards) and composer.

== Biography ==
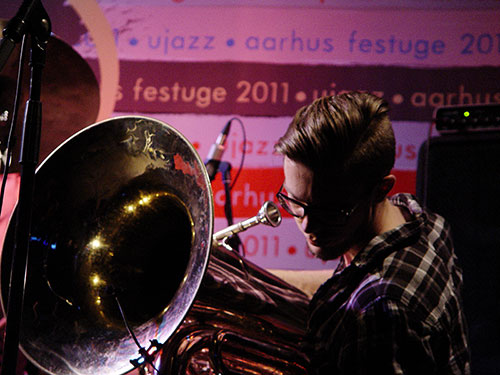
Kristoffer Lo (2011)

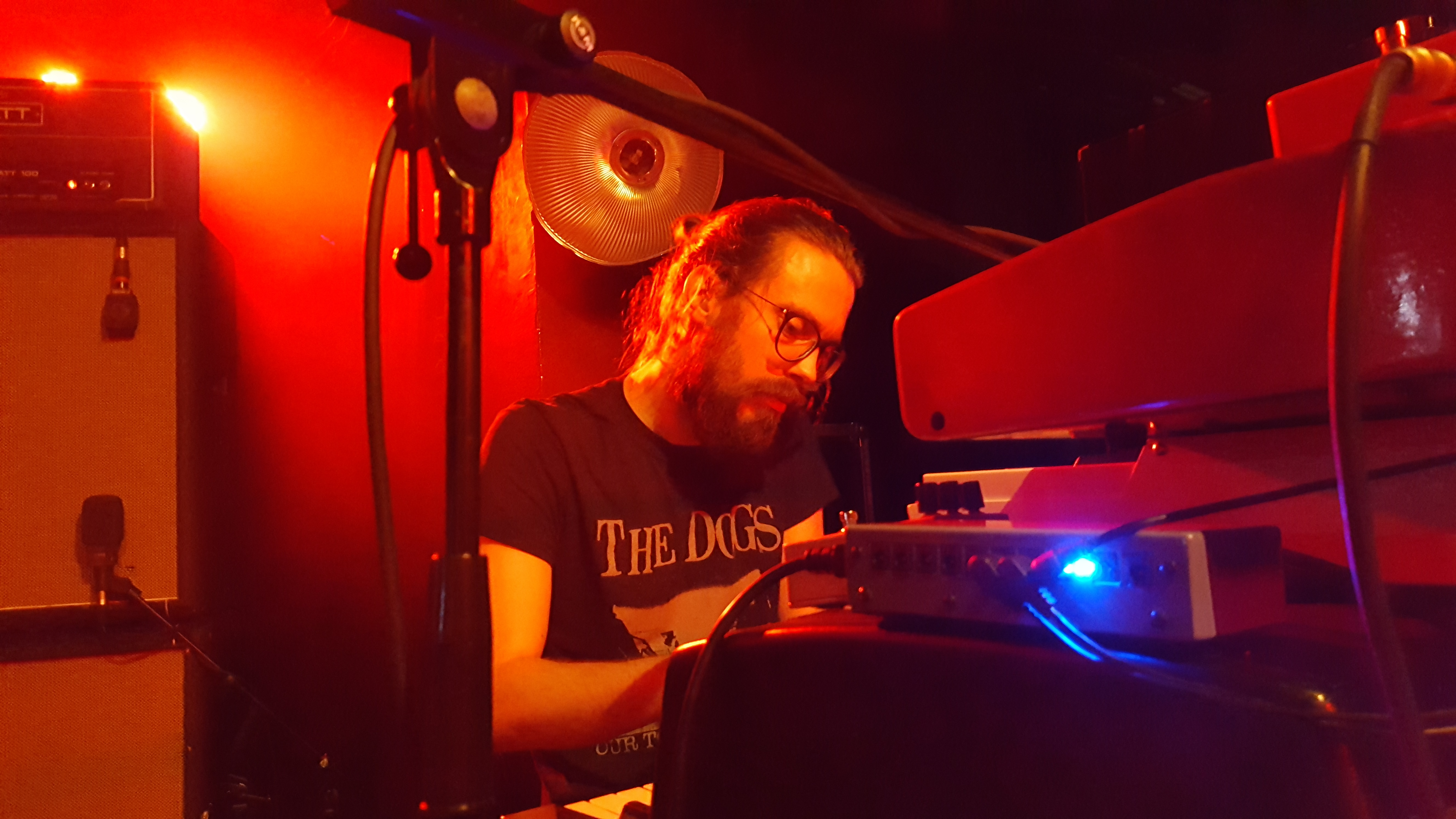
Kristoffer Lo (2017 with Motorpsycho)

Lo has redefined the use of tuba and its role in band. From its traditional role as the low-end in symphony orchestras and Dixieland bands, he has taken the instrument to a new direction, filling the position as the ultra low end in metal- and noise bands. With a bunch of electronics and huge amps, Kristoffer’s tuba sounds like a low-end monster and a high pitched squeal at the same time. He is a part of bands like Pelbo, Trondheim Jazz Orchestra, Microtub, Sunswitch and Highasakite.

With music studies from the jazz program at the Musikkonservatoriet i Trondheim, he has slowly built up a solid reputation both in Norway and elsewhere.

== Honors ==
- 2013: This years Jazzstipendiat at Moldejazz

== Discography ==
=== Solo albums ===
- 2013: Anomie (Gigafon Records)
- 2016: The Black Meat (Propeller Recordings)

=== Collaborations ===
Midtnorsk Ungdomsstorband with André Roligheten and Brother K

- 2009: Live At Dokkhuset (MNJ Records)

With PELbO

- 2010: PELbO (Riot Factory)
- 2011: Days Of Transcendence (Riot Factory)

With Microtub (Hayward / Lo / Taxt)

- 2011: Microtub (Sofa Records)
- 2014: Star System (Sofa Records)

With Machina

- 2011: So Much For Dancing (Øra Fonogram)

With Sunswitch

- 2012: Sunswitch (Riot Factory)

With Highasakite

- 2012: All That Floats Will Rain (Propeller Records)
- 2014: Silent Treatment (Propeller Records)

With Yodok

- 2013: #2 (The Perfect Hoax)

With Yodok III

- 2014: Yodok III (A New Wave Of Jazz)
- 2015: The Sky Flashes. The Great Sea Yearns. (A New Wave Of Jazz)

With Trondheim Jazz Orchestra

- 2015: Savages (MNJ Records) feat. Kristoffer Lo

With Motorpsycho

- 2018: Roadwork Vol. 5 – Field Notes: The Fantastic Expedition of Järmyr, Ryan, Sæther & Lo - Live in Europe 2017 (Rune Grammofon) (Stickman Records)
