= Worsøe =

Worsøe is a Scandinavian surname. Notable people with the surname include:

- Claus Nieuwejaar Worsøe (1822–1906), Norwegian civil servant and politician
- Laura Worsøe (born 2001), Danish footballer
