= Fieh =

- Origin: Oslo, Norway
- Genres: Neo soul; funk; indie pop
- Years active: 2014–present
- Labels: Decca Records; Honeymoon
- Members: Ola Øverby; Andreas Rukan; Sofie Tollefsbøl; Lyder Øvreås Røed; Jørgen Kasbo; Edvard Synnes; Solveig Wang; Thea Lien
- Website: Official site

Fieh is a Norwegian neo soul band from Oslo. The group was founded by bassist Andreas Rukan, vocalist Sofie Tollefsbøl, and drummer Ola Øverby in 2014.

== History ==
Ola Øverby, Andreas Rukan, and Sofie Tollefsbøl met after performing together for a previous band.

Their single "Glu" was featured in the video game FIFA 20.

In 2020, the band was included in the album Blue Note Re:Imagined.

== Discography ==
- Cold Water Burning Skin (2019)
- In The Sun In The Rain (2022)
- III (2023)
