= Ingrid Helene Håvik =

- Håvik with Highasakite in 2026.

Background information
- Born: 20 May 1987 (age 39); Ålesund, Sunnmøre
- Genres: Pop music, jazz
- Occupations: Musician, composer
- Instrument: Vocals

Ingrid Helene Håvik (born 1987 in Ålesund, Norway) is a Norwegian songwriter and vocalist. She is best known as the lead singer of Highasakite but has also released a solo album under the artist name Ingrid.

== Biography ==
Håvik is a former member of the band Your Headlights Are On with a self-titled album in 2011. Highasakite was formed the same year, and they released their debut album All That Floats Will Rain the next year, with Håvik as one of the main composers. In 2014 the second album Silent Treatment was released, with all music and lyrics composed by Håvik. For this album, she won the Composer category during the 2014 Spellemannprisen. She was also nominated in the Lyricist category, while the band won the category Pop Group of the Year for the album.

Håvik released her debut solo album Babylove under the stage name Ingrid in November 2013.

She is a guest singer on a-ha's MTV Unplugged – Summer Solstice album, which was recorded in late June 2017. She sings The Sun Always Shines On TV with Morten Harket.

== Discography ==
=== Solo albums ===
- 2013: Babylove (Propeller Recordings)

=== Collaborations ===
With Highasakite

- 2012: All That Floats Will Rain (Riot Factory)
- 2014: Silent Treatment (Propeller Recordings)
- 2016: Camp Echo (propeller Recordings)
- 2016: Acoustic Versions EP (Propeller recordings)
- 2017: 5 Million Miles (Propeller recordings)
- 2019: Uranium Heart (Propeller Recordings)
- 2022: Mother (Propeller Recordings)
- 2025: Testament (Propeller Recordings)

Awards
Preceded by Lars Petter Hagen	Recipient of the Spellemannprisen composer award 2014	Succeeded by Ørjan Matre
