= Israelvis =

- Origin: Trondheim, Norway
- Genres: Alternative rock Electronic rock, hard rock, indie rock
- Years active: 1988 - Present
- Label: Progress Records

Israelvis is a Norwegian rock band from Trondheim formed in 1988 by members of Angor Wat, a punk band that had just broke up.

== History ==
In the first year, the band consisted of Tor Egil "Gillo" Ingebrigtsen (bass), Viggo Mastad (guitar), Bård Noodt (vocals), and Jens-Petter Wiig (drums), but by the time the second album Half Past Heaven was released, Noodt was no longer with the group, and Mastad had taken over the singing in what now was a trio. Later guitarist Morten Skjørholm (from 1994 till now) and keyboard player and producer Trude Midtgaard (from 1994 till 2005) would also join.

Israelvis became one of Norway's most important alternative bands in the early nineties. Their debut was released in 1989, titled Heart to Heart Politics. One year later the band released Half Past Heaven (1990), the EP We Only Live Twice (1992), and could reach a breakthrough with the album Albino Blue in 1993. The following albums Church of Israelvis (1994) and Eurosis (1996) became fan favorites and in 2005 the band released their so far last album, The Israelvis Effect.

Although controversy surrounding their name followed the band through their career it wasn't until the release of the mini album 'Church Of Israelvis' in 1995 it had any greater effect. The cover, showing a young Elvis Presley with a bloody Star of David on his forehead, was banned in Germany causing the band to make a new cover for the German market. A picture of what looks like Jesus Christ with a bloody dollar sign painted on his forehead was instead chosen as the German version of the front cover. The album also had guest appearances from Steve Ignorant of Crass and Katja Osvold of Life... But How To Live It?

The Israelvis sound can be described as an addition of sharp guitar hardrock/metal style, with ironically and politically charged lyrics. Their style was influenced by diverse genres, like punk, metal, jazz, electronica, mambo and other sonic brique-a-braques. The band's music has been described as cutting edge, unpredictable, and uncompromising.

During the 90s, the band had significant success in the alternative music scene in Norway and Germany.

During the summer of 2010 the band reunited for a one-off concert at the Pstereo festival in Trondheim, Norway, and also used the opportunity to record the single Random City, with Katja Benneche Osvold on lead vocals.

== Band members ==
- Tor Egil Ingebrigtsen, bass
- Morten Skjørholm, guitar
- Jens-Petter Wiig, drums
- Viggo Mastad vocals and guitar
- Trude Midtgaard, keyboards

== Discography (incomplete) ==
Albums:

- Heart to Heart Politics (1989)
- Half Past Heaven (1990)
- Albino Blue (1993)
- Church of Israelvis (1995)
- Eurosis (1996)
- The Israelvis Effect (2005)

EPs and singles:

- Sweet Bird of Truth (1989)
- We Only Live Twice (1992)
- Bitter Lennon (1992)
- Mutilation (1993)
- Random City, feat Katja (2010)

Contributions to various artists compilations:

- "Dyrevise" - Ellediller & Krokofanter (1996)
- "Havana Affair" (live) - We're the Ramones (1998)
- "Mine klamme hender" - Det beste til meg og mine venner: En hyllest til Joachim Nielsen (2005)
