= Rockland (Katzenjammer album) =

Studio album by Katzenjammer
- Released: January 16, 2015
- Recorded: 2014
- Genre: Pop rock, alternative
- Label: Propeller
- Producer: Victor Van Vugt

Katzenjammer chronology
A Kiss Before You Go (2011)	Rockland (2015)

Rockland is the third and final studio album by Norwegian band Katzenjammer. It was released on January 16, 2015, in Europe and on March 10, 2015, in North America. The album is named after Rockland County, New York.

== Track listing ==
No.	Title	Lyrics	Music	Length
1.	"Old De Spain"	Mats Rybø, Anne Marit Bergheim	Rybø, Bergheim	4:40
2.	"Curvaceous Needs"	Marianne Sveen	Odd Nordstoga, Sveen	3:27
3.	"Oh My God"	Solveig Heilo	Heilo	3:25
4.	"Lady Grey"	Sveen	Sveen	3:18
5.	"My Own Tune"	Turid J. Honerud, Ole-Kristian J. Honerud	T. J. Honerud, Stian Kårstad	2:47
6.	"Shine Like Neon Rays"	Heilo, Rybø	Heilo, Rybø	4:54
7.	"Driving After You"	Sveen	Sveen	3:54
8.	"Flash in the Dark"	Rybø, Bergheim	Rybø, Bergheim	3:59
9.	"My Dear"	Heilo	Heilo, David Bvrn	3:05
10.	"Bad Girl"	Heilo	Heilo	3:57
11.	"Rockland"	Rybø	Bergheim	5:01

Deluxe edition bonus tracks
No.	Title	Lyrics	Music	Length
12.	"Hurricane"	Heilo, Mel	Heilo, Egil Clavsen	4:21
13.	"Marching and Drumming"	Rybø, Jørgensen	Rybø, Mel	3:46
14.	"Ouch"	Sveen	Sveen	2:40
Total length:				53:13

== Personnel ==
Credits adapted from Rockland liner notes.

=== Katzenjammer ===
- Anne Marit Bergheim – instruments, vocals
- Solveig Heilo – instruments, vocals
- Turid J. Honerud – instruments, vocals
- Marianne Sveen – instruments, vocals

=== Additional musicians ===
- Amund Maarud – guitar on "Old de Spain" and "Curvaceous Needs"
- Jørgen Nordby – drums on "Rockland"
