= Sløtface =

Norwegian pop punk band

- Also known as: Slutface
- Origin: Norway
- Genres: Punk rock, pop-punk
- Years active: 2013–present
- Label: Propeller Recordings
- Members: Haley Shea
- Past members: Tor-Arne Vikingstad; Lasse Lokøy; Nils Jørgen Nilsen; Halvard Skeie Wiencke
- Website: slotface.no

Sløtface, formerly known (and still pronounced) as Slutface, are a Norwegian pop punk band from Stavanger. Formed in 2012, the group started when vocalist Haley Shea and guitarist Tor-Arne Vikingstad began writing songs together, later being joined by drummer Halvard Skeie Wiencke who had previously played in a hardcore band with Tor-Arne and bassist Lasse Lokøy. Releasing their first single "Angst" in 2014, the band signed to Propeller Recordings record label in the summer of 2015. In October 2015, they released "Shave My Head" alongside B-side "Get My Own". The release was succeeded by their third single "Kill Em With Kindness" in January 2016.

On 1 April 2016 the band changed their name to Sløtface, citing social media censorship issues and released the single "Sponge State", reaching critical acclaim. The single became the lead track of the band's debut EP, Sponge State. The band released their second EP, Empire Records, on 18 November 2016. The four-track EP included singles "Take Me Dancing", "Bright Lights" and lead-track "Empire Records", the latter single garnering huge support from the music and film industry alike with its references to the 1990s cult-classic films Empire Records and High Fidelity.

On 27 April 2017, the band announced the upcoming release of their debut album Try Not to Freak Out along with its first single "Magazine". The album was released on 15 September 2017.

In October 2019 the band announced the album Sorry for the Late Reply. The album was released on 31 January 2020 to positive reviews.

On 13 June 2022, the band announced the departure of Lasse Lokøy and Tor-Arne Vikingstad.

== Musical career ==
Hailing from Stavanger, Norway, the four-piece formed after vocalist Haley Shea and guitarist Tor-Arne Vikingstad began writing songs together. The band was then joined by drummer Halvard Skeie Wiencke - who took some convincing to join Sløtface, but "he enjoyed it - so he continued playing!" - and later by bassist Lasse Lokøy.

To date the band have released three EPs: Slutface, Sponge State and Empire Records, two albums: Try Not to Freak Out and Sorry for the Late Reply, and 13 singles.

On 28 April 2017, the band announced the release of their debut album Try Not to Freak Out alongside the release of new single Magazine - set for release on 15 September 2017 via Propeller Recordings. To coincide with the album's release the band also announced a 30+ date tour of the UK, Europe and Australia.

== Name ==
The band's name (originally "Slutface") was chosen to juxtapose with their feminist message and grab attention. In an unreleased 2016 interview, the band said that the controversial name didn't cause them too much trouble back home, with their increasing popularity even leading to the Norwegian government to pay them to tour high schools in their home country. Despite Norway's large English-speaking population, the band said that the name was not nearly as provocative there as it would turn out to be in the UK and America.

On 1 April 2016, citing "social media censorship", the band permanently renamed themselves to Sløtface, however still pronounced "Slutface".

== Political activism ==
The band are known for their feminist lyrics and attitude, as well as their vocal support for causes such as protecting the environment, and gender equality.

The band's video for the 2016 single "Sponge State" sparked a huge reaction and became a topic of conversation. The band are shown performing on top of Norway's Førde Fjord in support of, and alongside, youth activists who are engaged in a peaceful protest against the mining company Nordic Mining dumping more than 250 million tonnes of chemicals and waste in the fjord.

Sløtface said of the event, "After an eleven-hour drive, four ferries and a blizzard, we finally got our gear up the mountain and played a show for the chained-up activists and some Finnish workers. Best audience ever. Eventually the boss man from Nordic Mining showed up and called the cops – the protesters were arrested, and each received a $1200 USD fine, and we got banned from being on the mountain."

More than 80 people were arrested during the three-week protest, starting from 1 February 2016, with the young activists fined in excess of US$100,000 and targeted in a Nordic Mining lawsuit to the tune of $250,000. Charges were formally dropped in April 2016.

On 8 March 2017, the band joined in with millions around the world, marching for International Women's Day in their home country of Norway.

They have spoken about their stance on women's rights and feminist issues multiple times, and regularly write about feminism and equal rights within their songs' lyrics.

When in Austin, TX, USA for SXSW 2017, the band were interviewed by CNN for their stance and thoughts on women's rights and equality under the new President, drawing praise and criticism alike. "With Trump in office, it's really important to keep the fight for women's rights more active than anything right now because we don't want to take a step back"

== Discography ==
=== Albums ===
Title	Release details
Try Not to Freak Out	Released: 15 September 2017; Label: Propeller Recordings
Sorry for the Late Reply	Released: 31 January 2020; Label: Propeller Recordings
Film Buff	Released: 27 September 2024; Label: Propeller Recordings

=== Extended plays ===
Title	Release details
Slutface	Released: July 2013; Label: Mnm Medieproduksjon As
We're Just OK	Released: 14. October 2014; Label: Daniel Engen Productions
Sponge State	Released: 27 May 2016; Label: Propeller Recordings
Sløtface on Audiotree Live	Released: 1 November 2016; Label: Sløtface, Audiotree Music
Empire Records	Released: 18 November 2016; Label: Propeller Recordings
the slumber tapes	Released: 4 December 2020; Label: Propeller Recordings
AWAKE/ASLEEP	Released: 24 February 2023; Label: Propeller Recordings

=== Singles ===
Year	Title	Release details
2014	"Angst"	We're Just OK
2015	"Shave My Head"	Sponge State
2016	"Kill Em with Kindness"	Sponge State
2016	"Sponge State"	Sponge State
2016	"Take Me Dancing"	Empire Records
2016	"Bright Lights"	Empire Records
2016	"Empire Records'"	Empire Records
2017	"Magazine"	Try Not to Freak Out
2017	"Nancy Drew"	Try Not to Freak Out
2017	"Pitted"	Try Not to Freak Out
2019	"Telepathetic"	Sorry for the Late Reply
2019	"Stuff"	Sorry for the Late Reply
2019	"Sink or Swim"	Sorry for the Late Reply
2019	"S.U.C.C.E.S.S."	Sorry for the Late Reply
2019	"New year, new me"	Sorry for the Late Reply
2020	"Tap the Pack"	Sorry for the Late Reply
2020	'"Doctor"	the slumber tapes
2022	"Beta" b/w "Come Hell or Whatever"	AWAKE/ASLEEP
2022	"HAPPY"	AWAKE/ASLEEP
2023	"Nose"	AWAKE/ASLEEP
2023	"Fight Back Time" (with The Buoys)	Non-album single
2024	"Final Gørl"	Film Buff
2024	"Tired Old Dog"	Film Buff
2024	"Ladies of the Fight"	Film Buff
2024	"I Used To Be A Real Piece Of Shit"	Film Buff

== Awards and nominations ==
Year	Organization	Award	Work	Result
2017	Spellemannprisen	Beste Rock (Best Rock Album)	Try Not to Freak Out	Won

Awards
Preceded by Kvelertak	Recipient of the rock Spellemannprisen; 2017	Succeeded by -
