= Highasakite =

Norwegian indie pop/indie rock band

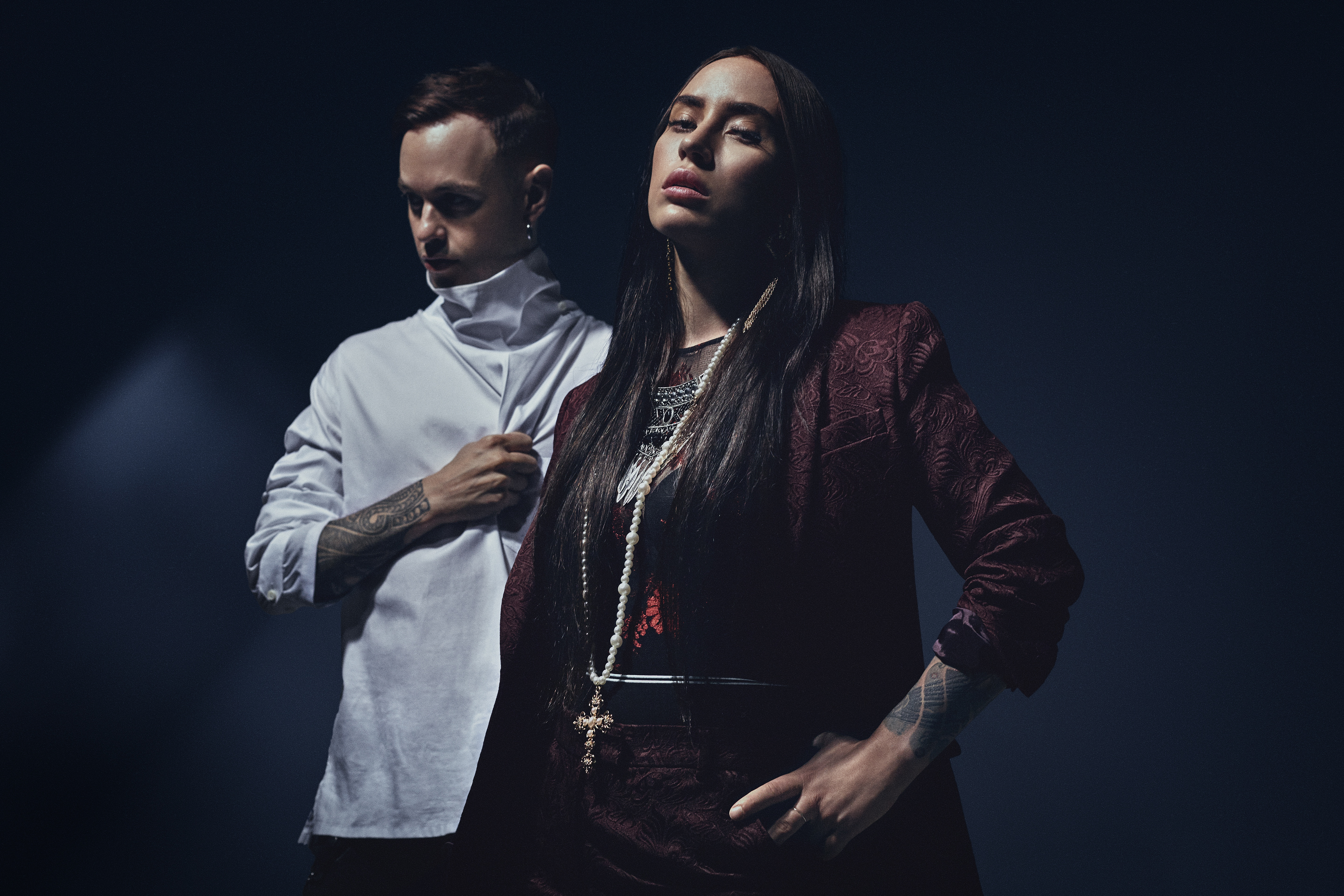
- Highasakite in 2018

Background information
- Origin: Trondheim, Norway
- Genres: Indie rock; indie pop
- Years active: 2010–present
- Label: Propeller
- Members: Ingrid Helene Håvik; Trond Bersu; Øystein Moen
- Past members: Øystein Skar; Marte Eberson; Kristoffer Lo
- Website: highasakite.no

Highasakite is an indie pop and indie rock band from Trondheim, Norway. The band formed when vocalist and songwriter Ingrid Helene Håvik met drummer Trond Bersu whilst studying jazz at the Trondheim Jazz Conservatory. In 2010, after just six months, the duo started working on their debut album. The album All That Floats Will Rain was released in 2012.

== History ==
=== Formation and All That Floats Will Rain (2010–2012) ===
Vocalist Ingrid Håvik and drummer Trond Bersu met while Bersu was studying jazz at the Trondheim Jazz Conservatory; after starting out as a duo, the two recruited Thomas Dahl, a producer, to help out on bass and guitar, and Øystein Skar joined the group to play synthesizer. After bonding they spent the next six months working on a debut album. Their debut album, All That Floats Will Rain, was released in Norway in February 2012 on the record label Riot Factory, and was produced by Juhani Silvola and Thomas Dahl. The album reached #16 on the Norwegian Albums Chart. After the album's release the band began to play live shows, adding Marte Eberson on synthesizer and Kristoffer Lo on guitar, percussion, flugabone, and tuba to extend their layered instrumentation, and flesh out their sound. Highasakite started out opening for other musical projects like Your Headlights Are On, PELbO and Sacred Harp. The band later performed at many festivals in 2012, including Øyafestivalen and the Iceland Airwaves.

=== Silent Treatment (2014) ===
Their second album, Silent Treatment, was released in February 2014 and reached #1 on the Norwegian Albums Chart. It was named the second best album of the year by Norwegian music critics in a list published by Dagsavisen. The group toured extensively this year, mostly in Norway. They also toured with the Icelandic band Of Monsters and Men during their Europe tour. At the 2015 14th Annual Independent Music Awards, Highasakite was the winner in the "Pop Album" category for Silent Treatment. The band had the first album with 92 consecutive weeks (and counting) on the Norwegian Billboard "Topp 40" at VG-lista. For the album, Highasakite won the "Pop Group of the Year Award" at the Norwegian equivalent of the Grammy Awards, Spellemannprisen; additionally Håvik was nominated in the categories "Composer of the Year" and "Writer of the Year", winning the former. The same year the band won the Bendiksen Award, an award and grant given to up-and-coming artists to help develop their talent, winning 100,000 Norwegian kroner.

=== Camp Echo (2016) ===
The third album, Camp Echo, was released on 20 May 2016. The first single from the album, "Someone Who'll Get It", released early 2016, received significant critical acclaim upon release, highlighting an anticipation for their third album. The second single, "Golden Ticket", was released in April 2016. On 2 December 2016 the band released the Acoustic Versions EP, consisting of four previous tracks from Camp Echo and Silent Treatment. The EP features band member Marte Eberson on the piano, and shows off lead singer Ingrid Helene Håvik's arrangement ability and powerful vocals.

Highasakite was one of several performers, alongside artists including Sting and Halsey, who played at the Nobel Peace Prize Concert 2016 on 11 December, performing songs "Golden Ticket" and "Lover, Where Do You Live?".

Their album Camp Echo was shortlisted by IMPALA (The Independent Music Companies Association) for the Album of the Year Award 2016, which rewards on a yearly basis the best album released on an independent European label.

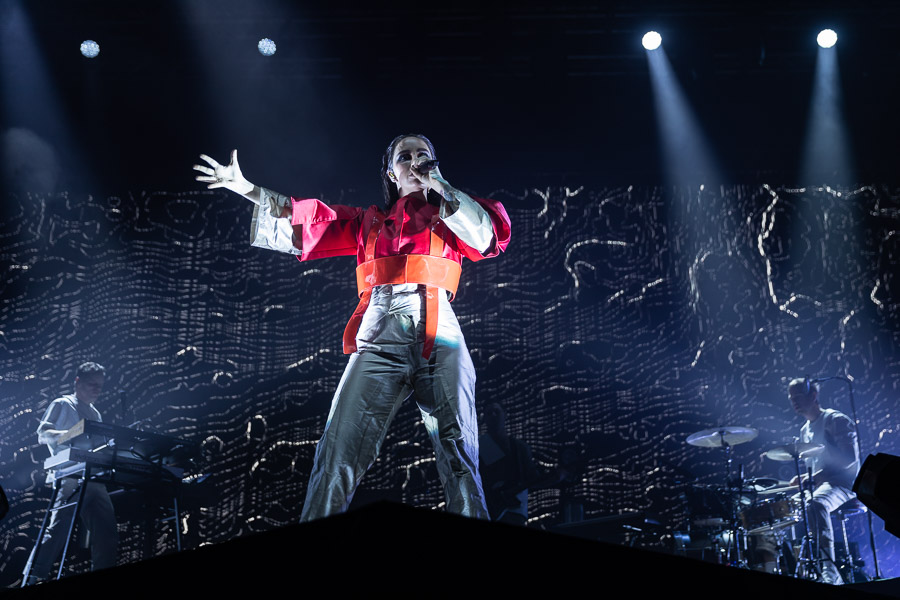
Highasakite performing in Oslo in March 2019

Highasakite released the single "5 Million Miles" in April 2017.

=== Uranium Heart and The Bare Romantic (2019–2020) ===
On 16 November 2018, the band announced their fourth studio album Uranium Heart, produced by Bersu with all tracks written by Håvik. The album was later released on 1 February 2019, and the band embarked on an arena sized tour across Norway.

In October 2019, the band released the first part of a two part mini album titled "The Bare Romantic", with first single "Can I Be Forgiven" reaching #26 on the Spotify Norway top 200. The second part of the mini album, released 7 February 2020 contained the single "Under The Sun" which appeared in the Norwegian film Tunnelen.

In February 2020 Highasakite were nominated for the "Pop Group of the Year Award" at the Norwegian equivalent of the Grammy Awards.

== Discography ==
=== Albums ===
Year	Album	Peak positions		Track list
Year	Album	NOR	AUS	Track list
2012	All That Floats Will Rain	16	—	1. "Son of a Bitch"; 2. "Winners Don't Come Easy"; 3. "Indian Summer"; 4. "When You Have Gone"; 5. "In and Out of Weeks"; 6. "God Is a Banquet"; 7. "My Soldier"; 8. "Whatever That Means"; 9. "Everything Sank in You"; 10. "The Heron"
2014	Silent Treatment	1	90	1. "Lover, Where Do You Live?"; 2. "Since Last Wednesday"; 3. "Leaving No Traces"; 4. "Hiroshima"; 5. "My Only Crime"; 6. "I, the Hand Grenade"; 7. "Darth Vader"; 8. "Iran"; 9. "The Man on the Ferry"; 10. "Science & Blood Tests"
2016	Camp Echo	1	24	1. "My Name Is Liar"; 2. "Samurai Swords"; 3. "Someone Who'll Get It"; 4. "My Mind Is a Bad Neighborhood"; 5. "God Don't Leave Me"; 6. "I Am My Own Disease"; 7. "Golden Ticket"; 8. "Deep Sea Diver"; 9. "Chernobyl"
2019	Uranium Heart	4	—	1. "Too Early"; 2. "Revolution"; 3. "I Call Bullshit"; 4. "Mexico"; 5. "Mexico, Pt. 2"; 6. "Hail of Bullets"; 7. "Out of Order"; 8. "Egomaniac"; 9. "Uranium Heart"; 10. "Stick with You"; 11. "Outro"
2022	Mother	2	—	1. "I Just Moved Here"; 2. "Mother"; 3. "Atomic Sparks"; 4. "Keep it Alive"; 5. "Under the Same Sky"; 6. "Love Him Anyway"; 7. "Tell Her Yourself"; 8. "So Cold"; 9. "Autopsy"; 10. "Can I Come Home"
2025	Testament	6	—	1. "Messiah"; 2. "Biblical"; 3. "Call Me When You Need Me"; 4. "Chemotherapy"; 5. "So Cool"; 6. "Make It"; 7. "But, I loved" 8. "Farewell"; 9. "Requiem"

=== Extended plays ===
Year	EP	Peak positions	Track list
Year	EP	NOR	Track list
2016	Acoustic Versions	—	1. "Samurai Swords" (acoustic version); 2. "Golden Ticket" (acoustic version); 3. "Since Last Wednesday" (acoustic version); 4. "Leaving No Traces" (acoustic version)
2019	The Bare Romantic, Part 1	—	1. "Can I Be Forgiven"; 2. "Through Tunnels and Towns"; 3. "Just a Small Quake"; 4. "Too Much to Handle"
2020	The Bare Romantic, Part 2	—	1. "The Bare Romantic"; 2. "Under the Sun"; 3. "All for Love"; 4. "Never Been Less Loved"
2024	Break It Right	6	

=== Singles ===
Year	Title	Peak position		Album
Year	Title	NOR	AUS	Album
2013	"Since Last Wednesday"	—	—	Silent Treatment
2016	"Someone Who'll Get It"	34	100	Camp Echo
2016	"Golden Ticket"	—	—	Camp Echo
2017	"5 Million Miles"	—	—	Non-album single
2018	"Out of Order"	36	—	Uranium Heart
2019	"Free to Go" (with Seeb)	14	—	Sad in Scandinavia
2019	"Can I Be Forgiven"	27	—	The Bare Romantic, Part 1
2020	"Under the Sun"	—	—	The Bare Romantic, Part 2
2022	"Mother"	29	—	Mother
2023	"Never Surrender"	4	—	Break It Right
2024	"OK jeg Lover"	12	—	Break It Right
2024	"Break It Right"	20	—	Break It Right
2025	"So Cool" (with Miriam Bryant)	39	—	Testament
2025	"Call Me When You Need Me"	81	—	Testament
2025	"But, I Loved"	45	—	Testament
2025	"Messiah"	51	—	Testament
2026	"Kongesangen"	48	—	Non-album single
"—" denotes a recording that did not chart or was not released.

== Awards and nominations ==
Year	Organization	Award	Work	Result
2014	GramArt	Bendiksen Award	Highasakite	Won
2015	Spellemannprisen '14	Popgruppe (Pop Group)	Silent Treatment	Won
2015	IMPALA	European Independent Album of the Year Award	Silent Treatment	Nominated
2016	IMPALA	European Independent Album of the Year Award	Camp Echo	Nominated
2017	Spellemannprisen '16	Popgruppe (Pop Group)	Camp Echo	Won
2017	Spellemannprisen '16	Årets Musikkvideo (Music Video of the Year)	Golden Ticket	Nominated
2020	Spellemannprisen '19	Popgruppe (Pop Group)	Uranium Heart	Nominated

Awards
Preceded by Real Ones	Recipient of the best Pop band Spellemannprisen; 2014	Succeeded by -
