= Ine Hoem =

Norwegian jazz singer

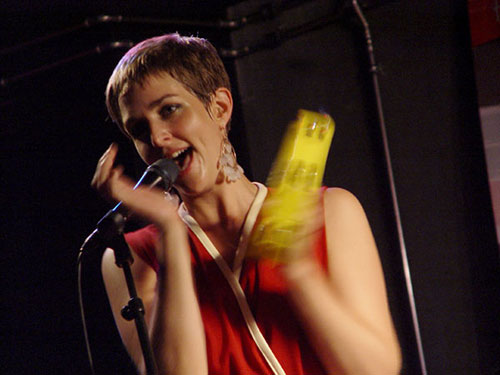
- Ine Hoem at U JAZZ in Aarhus (2011)

Background information
- Born: Ine Kristine Hoem; 19 December 1985 (age 40); Oslo, Norway
- Genres: Jazz
- Occupations: Musician, composer
- Instruments: Vocals, percussion
- Website: www.inehoem.com

Ine Kristine Hoem (born 19 December 1985 in Oslo, Norway) is a Norwegian jazz singer and the daughter of the author Edvard Hoem. She is also known as the lead singer of the genre band PELbO.

== Career ==
Hoem got her music diploma from the Jazz program at Norwegian University of Science and Technology (2009).

Within the band PELbO, she released the album PELbO (2010) and Days Of Trancendence (2011). The album PELbO was nominated for the 2010 Open class Spellemannprisen. She has also collaborated with bassist Jo Skaansar on the album Den Blåaste Natt.

== Discography ==
=== Solo albums ===
- 2015: Angerville (Propeller Recordings)

=== Collaborations ===
With Jo Skaansar

- 2010: Den Blåaste Natt (ta:lik)

Within PELbO

- 2010: PELbO (Riot Factory)
- 2011: Days Of Trancendence (Riot Factory)
