= Harrys Gym =

Norwegian pop group

Harrys gym
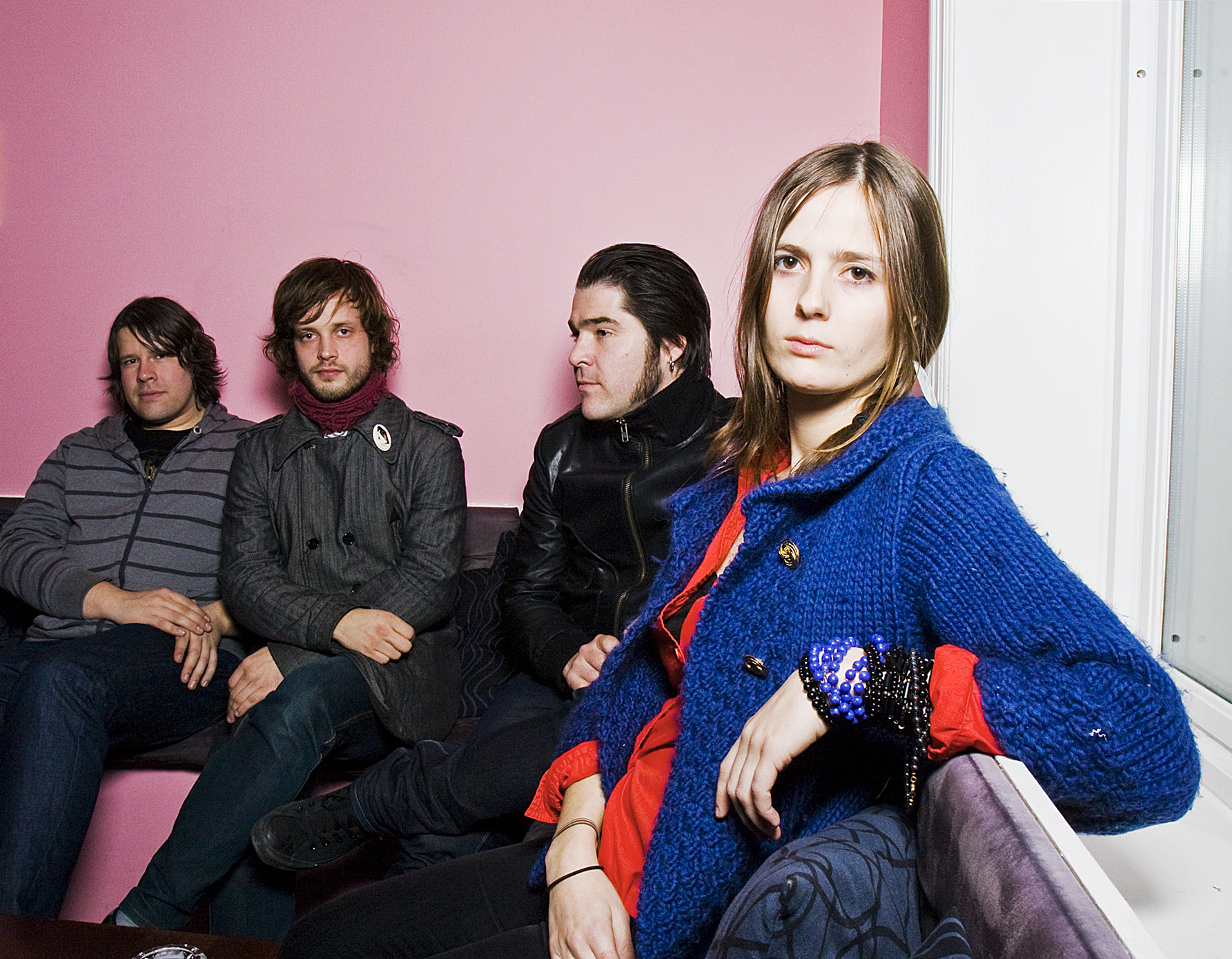

Background information
- Origin: Bergen, Norway
- Genres: indie, pop
- Years active: 2006–2013
- Labels: Hype City, Universal Music
- Members: Anne Lise Frøkedal; Bjarne Stensli; Erlend Ringseth; Ole Myrvold
- Website: harrys-gym.com

Harrys gym (sometimes misspelled as Harry's Gym) was a Norwegian pop group. The band consisted of Anne Lise Frøkedal (vocals, guitar), Erlend Ringseth (keyboard), Bjarne Stensli (drums), and Ole Myrvold (bass guitar). The band was formed in 2006, released their debut album, Harrys gym, in October 2008 and split up on 11 January 2013.

== History ==
=== Formation ===
All four band members were previously a part of Dharma, along with Ole Øvstedal, former guitarist of Euroboys. In 2004 they released the album Dreamland, Baby to positive reviews. Vocalist Anne Lise Frøkedal wrote two of the songs for the album, the rest were provided by Øvstedal. "We were young ... maybe we were naïve", drummer Bjarne Stensli later said of the album; "the band was unfinished, it sounded strange".

In a 2004 interview, Frøkedal mentioned a distinct difference in songwriting style between herself and Øvstedal. These differences eventually led to Øvstedal's departure. Bassist Ole Myhrvold later referred to it as "a musical divorce". The remaining four members decided to stay together and reformed under a new name, "Harrys gym". Whereas the name "Dharma" had been inspired by the novel The Dharma Bums by Jack Kerouac, the new band was named after an abandoned fitness center in the same building as their rehearsal space. The band deliberately omitted the possessive apostrophe from the name, to adhere to Norwegian grammatical rules. According to Frøkedal, Harrys gym is a "more pure pop band" than Dharma, with a "cleaner and more stringent sound".

=== Debut album ===
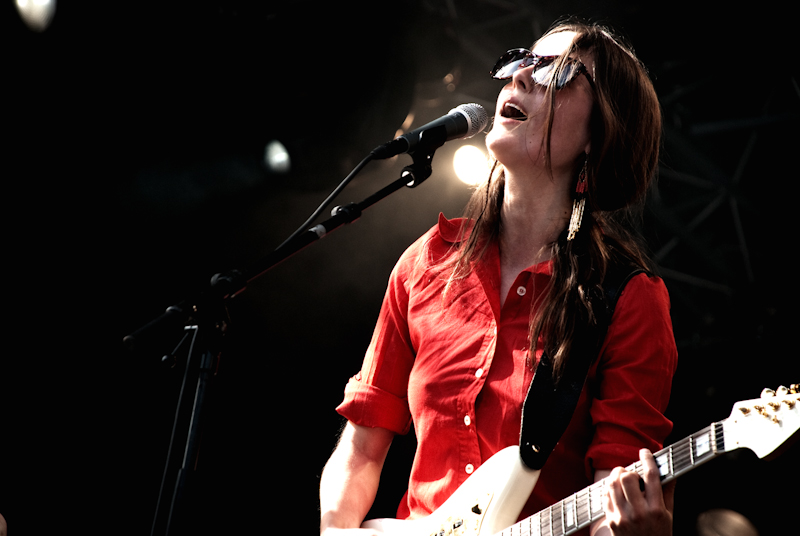
Performing at the Slottsfjell festival, 2009

Harrys gym released their eponymous debut album, on 27 October 2008. The album was produced by Stensli, with all songs written by Frøkedal. Dagbladet rated it 5 out of 6. According to the reviewer, "Anne Lise Frøkedal's vocals doesn't sound like leaves on the ground, but rather snow in the air, swirling and massive, weightless and fragile ..." Verdens Gang rated it 4 out of 6, characterizing the music as "fascinating dream-indie". One of the songs from the album, "Whisper", is played twice in the Norwegian horror film Cold Prey 2. "To sit in Colosseum Kino and hear our own song in that setting was insane", Stensli later said.

Another song, "Brother", was put in rotation by NRK P3 in November 2008. The song caught the attention of Universal Music Norway, and after several meetings, the band was eventually signed.

=== What Was Ours Can't Be Yours ===
Harrys gym released their second album 'What Was Ours Can't Be Yours' in the UK and mainland Europe in February 2011 on Oslo-based label Splendour. The band worked on the album with UK producer James Rutledge.

=== Festivals ===
Harrys gym has performed twice at the by:Larm festival. NME placed them in their top 5 list of artists of by:Larm 2008. Their performance also received a positive notice from Drowned in Sound's reviewer, who was particularly impressed by Frøkedal's vocals and guitar. He lauded the band for an "entirely engaging set, equal parts delicate and muscular". Their 2009 performance was well received by Clash, who highlighted the "stupidly talented drummer", and Frøkedal's "acerbic vocals" for particular acclaim. He compared the latter to the vocals of Garbage and The Knife.

=== Breakup ===
The band announced their breakup on 11 January 2013 on their Facebook page.

== Discography ==
- Harrys gym (2008)
- What Was Ours Can't Be Yours (2010)
