= A Kiss Before You Go =

Studio album by Katzenjammer
- Released: September 7, 2011
- Recorded: 2011
- Genre: Pop rock, dark cabaret, alternative
- Label: Propeller, Universal Music Group
- Producer: Kåre Chr. Vestrheim, Mike Hartung

Katzenjammer chronology
Le Pop (2008)	A Kiss Before You Go (2011)	A Kiss Before You Go: Live in Hamburg (2012)

Singles from A Kiss Before You Go
- 1. "I Will Dance (When I Walk Away)" Released: June 17, 2011; 2. "Rock-Paper-Scissors" Released: May 7, 2012

A Kiss Before You Go is the second studio album by Norwegian band Katzenjammer; it was released on September 9, 2011, by Propeller Recordings. The album's lyrics and visual direction were inspired by the French film The City of Lost Children, a maritime fantasy adventure.

== Reception ==
=== Critical reception ===
Professional ratings
Aggregate scores
Source	Rating
Metacritic	66/100
Review scores
Source	Rating
Allmusic	3/5 stars
BBC Music	(favorable)
The Independent	3/5 stars
MusicOHM	4/4 stars

A Kiss Before You Go received generally positive reviews from music critics. At Metacritic, which assigns a normalised rating out of 100 to reviews from mainstream critics, the album received an average score of 66, based on four reviews, which indicates "generally favorable reviews". Jon O'Brien of Allmusic wrote "it's difficult not to be enamored by [the album's] inventiveness and inherent avant-garde charm." BBC Music's Mischa Pearlman called the album "peculiar and unconventional" because it "constantly shape-shifts and surprises, but does so with a graceful, effortless ease that feels incredibly natural and utterly delightful". In a review for The Independent, Hugh Montgomery said its "oompah brass [and] jaunty jigs" were "best in small doses." He also described A Kiss Before You Go as "exhilarating and nauseous". MusicOHM reviewer Ben Weisz wrote that Katzenjammer's "latest effort is often raucous, occasionally majestic and close to brilliance."

=== Chart performance ===
In Norway, A Kiss Before You Go debuted at number eight on the albums chart. The following week it reached its peak position of number six. The album reached number seven in Germany, where it sold 100,000 copies and was certified gold.

A Kiss Before You Go debuted at number thirty-three in Switzerland. It remained on the chart for three weeks. The album also charted in the top fifty in Austria and the Netherlands. In Belgium, it peaked at number one hundred and thirty-one.

== Track listing ==
Songs written and composed by Mats Rybø, except where noted.

No.	Title	Lead vocals	Length
1.	"A Kiss Before You Go" (Rybø, Anne Marit Bergheim)	Jørgensen	1:16
2.	"I Will Dance (When I Walk Away)"	Heilo	3:50
3.	"Cherry Pie" (Marianne Sveen, Mike Hartung)	Sveen	3:01
4.	"Land of Confusion" (Mike Rutherford, Tony Banks, Phil Collins)	Sveen	3:35
5.	"Lady Marlene" (Solveig Heilo)	Bergheim	4:35
6.	"Rock-Paper-Scissors" (Katzenjammer, Robert Ellis Orral)	Heilo	3:28
7.	"Cocktails and Ruby Slippers"	Bergheim	3:59
8.	"Soviet Trumpeter" (Rybø, Bergheim)	Heilo	4:12
9.	"Loathsome M"	Jørgensen	2:41
10.	"Shepherd's Song" (Marianne Sveen)	Sveen	3:06
11.	"Gypsy Flee" (Sveen)	Instrumental	2:44
12.	"God's Great Dust Storm"	Sveen	4:06

== Personnel ==
Credits adapted from A Kiss Before You Go liner notes.

- Anne Marit Bergheim – instruments, vocals
- Mathias Fossum – photography
- Mike Hartung – arrangement, production, recording
- Solveig Heilo – arrangement, instruments, vocals
- Heyday – design
- Daniel Herskedal – sousaphone
- Hans Andreas Horntveth – recording assistant
- Turid Jørgensen – arrangement, instruments, vocals
- Gunnhild Mathea Olaussen – violin
- Mr. Orkester – percussion
- Chris Sansom – mastering
- Marianne Sveen – arrangement, instruments, vocals
- Kåre Chr. Vestrheim – arrangement, instruments, production, recording
- Dweezil Zappa – electric guitar

== Charts ==
Chart (2011)	Peak position
Austrian Albums Chart	36
Belgian Albums Chart (Flanders)	131
Dutch Albums Chart	41
German Albums Chart	7
Norwegian Albums Chart	6
Swiss Albums Chart	33

== Release history ==
Region(s)	Date	Format(s)	Label
Austria, Germany, Switzerland	September 9, 2011	CD, digital download, LP	Propeller
Norway	October 7, 2011	CD, digital download, LP	Propeller
United Kingdom	May 7, 2012	CD, digital download, LP	Propeller
