= Katzenjammer (band) =

Norwegian band

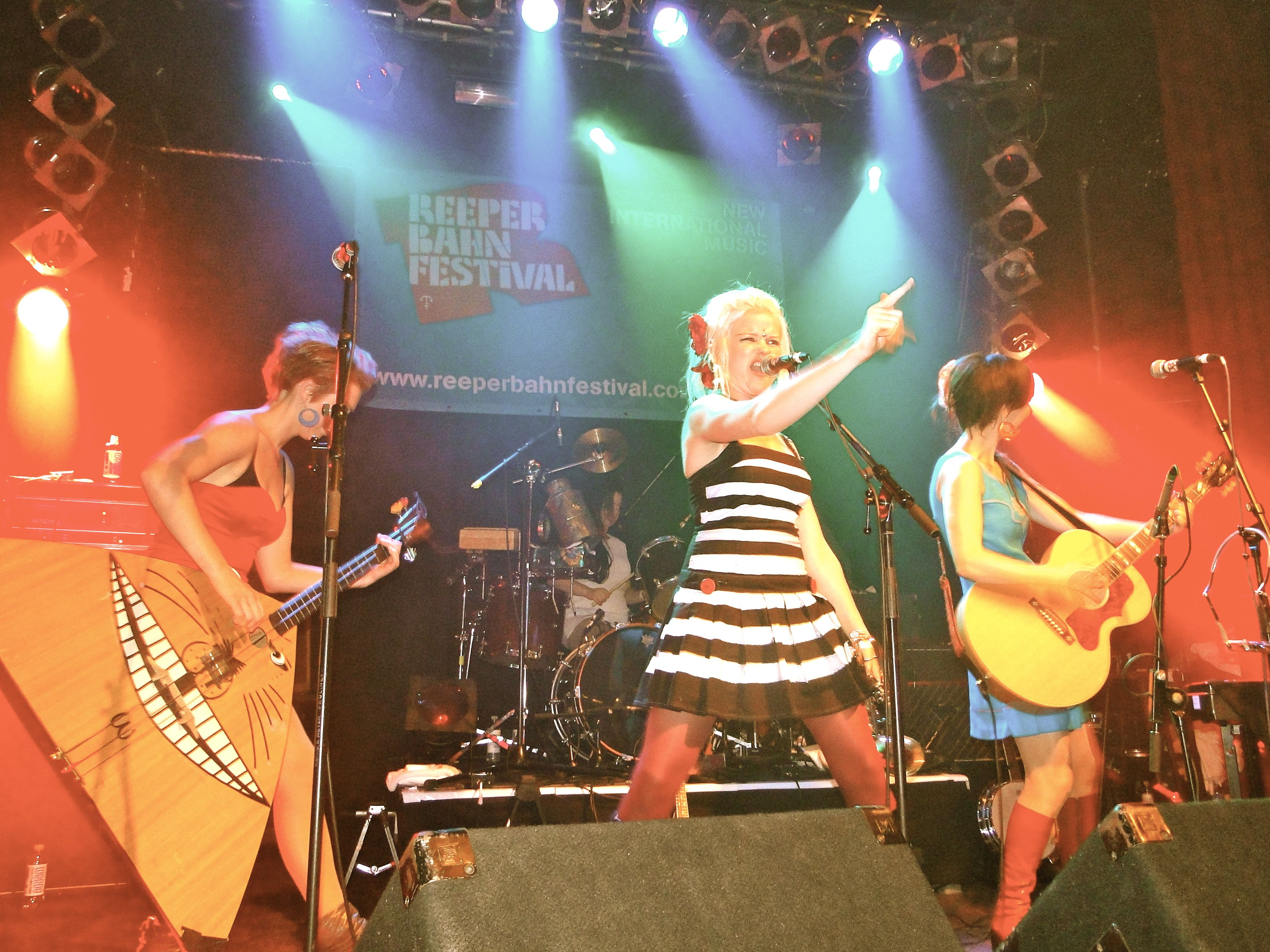
- Katzenjammer performing in Hamburg, Germany in 2009

Background information
- Origin: Oslo, Norway
- Genres: Rock, country, Balkan, dark cabaret
- Years active: 2005–2015
- Labels: Propeller, Universal, Nettwerk
- Past members: Marianne Sveen; Anne Marit Bergheim; Solveig Heilo; Turid Jørgensen
- Website: www.katzenjammer.com

Katzenjammer was an English-language Norwegian band from Oslo, formed in 2005. The band consisted of Anne Marit Bergheim, Solveig Heilo, Turid Jørgensen, and Marianne Sveen, the latter of whom left the band in the beginning of 2016, prompting an indefinite hiatus.

== History ==
=== 2005–07: Formation ===
The members of Katzenjammer met in 2004 while studying at a private music school in Oslo. The band was formed in 2007 while listening to Anne Marit Bergheim perform the song "Wading in Deeper" on the piano. They were brought together by a common feeling of being "the outcasts at the school." Katzenjammer felt that their music school didn't encourage originality, but "only wanted to teach what had been done."

The band is named after the Katzenjammer Kids, the oldest comic strip continually in syndication. They chose this comic strip because they noticed that they resembled the characters in it. The term Katzenjammer is a German loanword that literally means "lament of a cat", and is used in Norway to describe low-grade music and instrumentation (which in Germany would be called Katzenmusik, "music by cats").

=== 2009–10: Le Pop ===
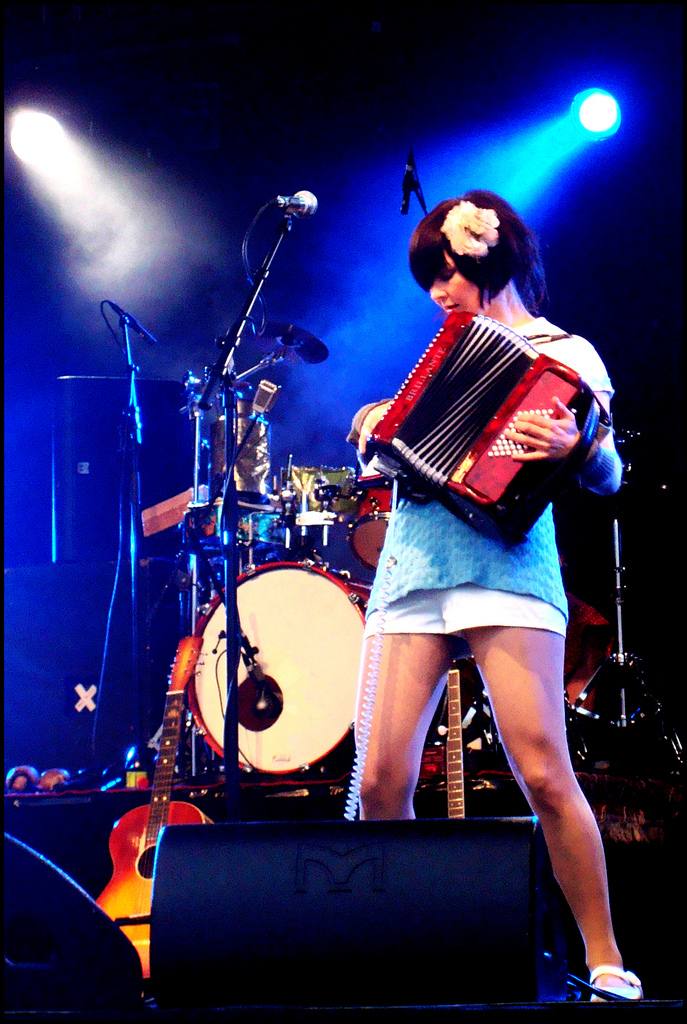
Anne Marit Bergheim performing live in Norway, June 2009

In 2008, Katzenjammer were chosen as one of the finalists in NRK's yearly Urørt competition for unsigned artists. They finished in third place with the song "A Bar in Amsterdam". That year they also performed at the Scandinavian music convention by:Larm in Oslo, gaining them national exposure.

Katzenjammer's debut album, Le Pop, was released in September 2008. The album was a mixture of different musical styles including pop, dark cabaret, country and bluegrass. Its songs were composed by the band's friend Mats Rybø, while the music was arranged by Katzenjammer on their fifteen shared instruments.

Le Pop was well received by music critics, and was described as "engrossing and appealing". It reached number nine on the Norwegian albums chart and number seventy-one in the Netherlands. In 2008, Le Pop was nominated for a Spellemannprisen award for Best Debut Album of the Year.

=== 2011–2013: A Kiss Before You Go ===
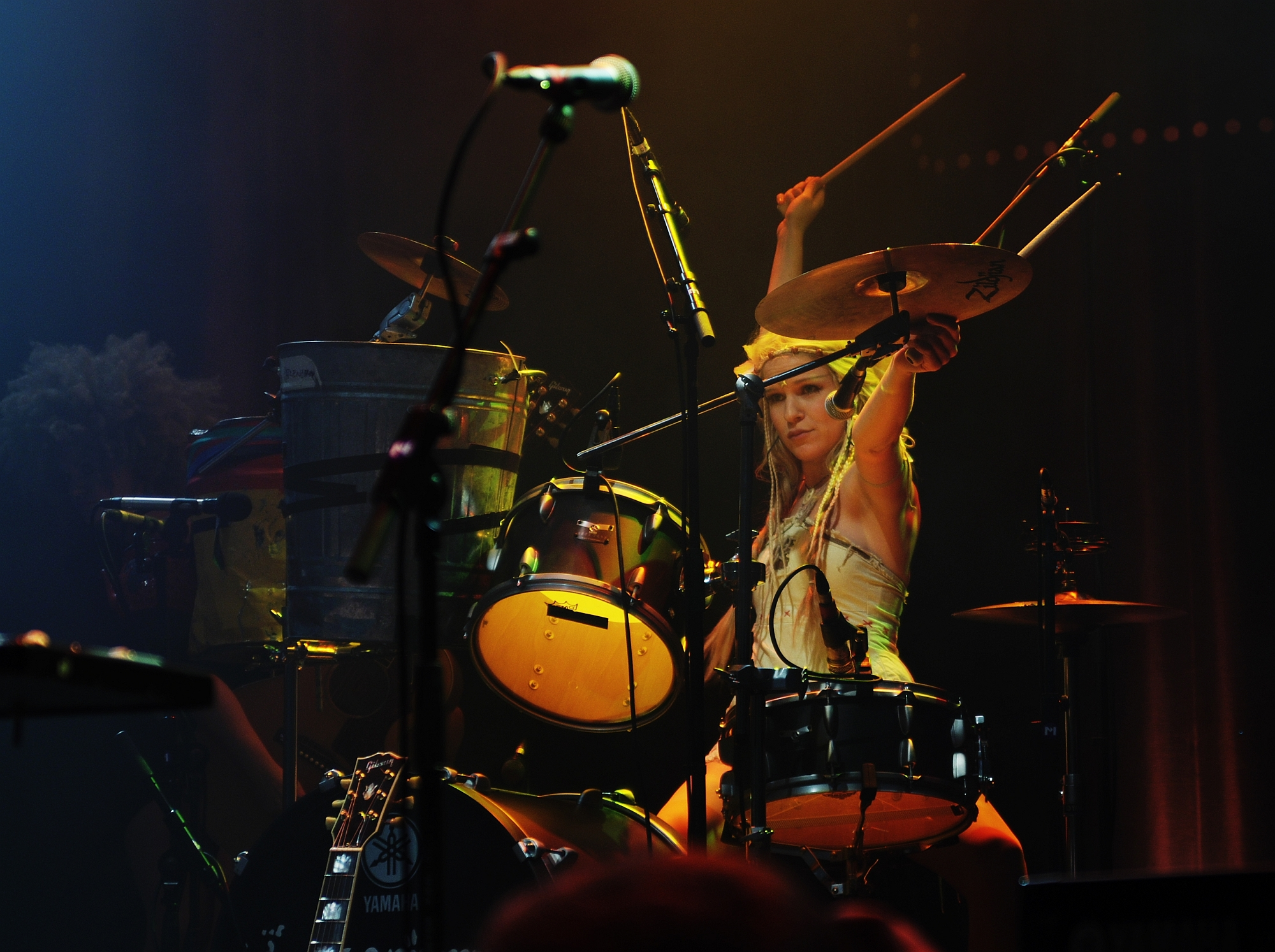
Solveig Heilo at metropool Hengelo 2011

A Kiss Before You Go, Katzenjammer's second album, was released in September 2011. The album's lyrics and visual direction were inspired by the French film The City of Lost Children, a maritime fantasy adventure.

A Kiss Before You Go debuted at number seven on the German albums chart, and was certified gold. In Norway, the album reached number six. The album received positive reviews from critics, who found it to be "utterly delightful" and "close to brilliance." The lead single, "I Will Dance (When I Walk Away)", was a minor hit in Germany, peaking at number thirty-two on the singles chart.

In May 2012, Katzenjammer released A Kiss Before You Go: Live in Hamburg, their first live album. Recorded at Große Freiheit 36 during the Hamburg, Germany dates of their 2011 tour, it was released in both CD and DVD formats. In 2013 they also contributed to the book Think like a rockstar, written by Ståle Økland.

=== 2014–2016: Rockland and Sveen's departure ===
On April 14, 2014, the band stated on their Facebook page that they were in studio recording their new album. On November 18, 2014, the first single, "Lady Grey", was released with a lyric video on YouTube. On January 5, 2015, the music video for "Lady Grey" was released via Clash Magazine. The new album, Rockland, was released on January 16, 2015, via Vertigo and Universal Music.

Marianne Sveen wanted to leave the band after ten years, something she told the other band members in April 2015. Later the same year, in December 2015, it was announced that Katzenjammer had decided to take a break as a band. One month later, it was announced to the public, that Sveen had decided to leave the band, something she wrote on Facebook in January 2016.

== Discography ==
- Le Pop (2008)
- A Kiss Before You Go (2011)
- Rockland (2015)
