= Propeller Recordings =

Norwegian independent record label

- Founded: 2003
- Founder: Frithjof Hungnes
- Genre: Various
- Country of origin: Norway
- Location: Oslo, London
- Official website: www.propellerrecordings.no

Propeller Recordings is a Norwegian independent record label, launched in 2003 in Oslo. It has grown into an influential label both in its home city as well as worldwide, and has now expanded to include a UK office based in London.

The label operates across a wide number of genres and concentrates on Norwegian artists who have commercial potential worldwide. The current roster including Dagny, Highasakite, Sløtface, Moddi, Apothek, The Fjords, Hanne Hukkelberg, Frøkedal and Thea & The Wild.

Propeller Recordings also now boasts sister label 0E0E (pronounced naughty-naughty) founded in 2015 in London, UK as a singles club. 0E0E has grown over the years and includes current artists such as Tempesst, Harlea and PLGRMS.

The label also set up Propeller Communications; an in-house online and radio PR service for all Propeller Recordings and 0E0E artists as well as external clients. Because of this, it covers a wide varieties or artists across many different genres.

== History ==
In 2011, as a result of a competitive review by jury deliberation, the label was awarded a 3-year subsidy from Music Export Norway under the terms of the Music Export Norway's Export Program. This is funding to the tune of up to NOK 300,000 ($50,000 USD) per year for up to three years. The total value per project can be up to NOK 900,000 (US$150,000).

At the start of 2017 it was announced that 5 artists from Propeller Recordings - Highasakite, Dagny, Moddi, Marte Wulff and Frøkedal - had received nominations for the Spellemannprisen awards, with Highasakite and Dagny receiving two nominations each. Often referred to as the Norwegian Grammy Awards the ceremony is highly prestigious and seen as the highest accolade a Norwegian musician can receive in their home country - with previous winners including A-Ha, Aurora, Kygo, Susanne Sundfør. The ceremony took place on 28 January 2017.

== Current Artists ==
- Dagny
- Highasakite
- Sløtface
- Moddi
- Apothek
- The Fjords
- Hanne Hukkelberg
- Amanda Tenfjord
- Marte Wulff
- Frøkedal
- Thea & The Wild
- Imitating Aeroplanes
- Solveig Heilo

== Catalogue Artists ==
- Team Me
- Katzenjammer
- Superfamily
- Ine Hoem
