= Pokémon DS =

Pokémon DS may refer to these video games in the Pokémon series for Nintendo DS.

- Pokémon Diamond and Pearl
- Pokémon Platinum
- Pokémon HeartGold and SoulSilver
- Pokémon Black and White
- Pokémon Black 2 and White 2
- Pokémon Ranger
- Pokémon Ranger: Shadows of Almia
- Pokémon Ranger: Guardian Signs
- Pokémon Mystery Dungeon: Blue Rescue Team
- Pokémon Mystery Dungeon: Explorers of Time and Explorers of Darkness
- Pokémon Mystery Dungeon: Explorers of Sky
- Pokémon Dash
- Pokémon Trozei!
- Pokémon Conquest
