= Project Hacker: Kakusei =

2006 video game

- Developer: Red Entertainment (Note: Creatures assisted on development.)
- Publisher: Nintendo
- Platform: Nintendo DS
- Release: JP: July 13, 2006
- Genre: Point and click adventure game
- Mode: Single-player

Project Hacker: Kakusei (プロジェクトハッカー 覚醒; "Project Hacker: Awakening") is a point and click adventure video game developed by Red Entertainment and published by Nintendo for the Nintendo DS. In Project Hacker: Kakusei, the player takes control of a hacker named Satoru Amatsubo. Both Satoru and detective partner Rina Okubo are employed by the internet crime-fighting GIS.

== Gameplay ==
The game features hacker-themed puzzles where the stylus is used for, among other tasks, program repair and password cracking. Project Hacker plays like an adventure game outside of these puzzles, similar to the Ace Attorney series.

== Development ==
Project Hacker: Kakusei was developed by Red Entertainment with involvement by publisher Nintendo. Creatures assisted on development. The game was initially announced under the title Detect Hacker at the 2005 DS Conference in Japan. The name was changed to Project Hacker in early 2006. In July 2007, one year after the game's Japanese launch, Nintendo of America filed copyrights for North American packaging and an instruction booklet for Project Hacker: Awakening, the English-translated title of the game. However, this localization never made it to release.

== Reception ==
On release, Weekly Famitsu scored the game a 27 out of 40.

== Sales ==
Project Hacker: Kakusei sold 37,000 copies in its launch week.

== In other games ==
Satoru appears as a spirit in Super Smash Bros. Ultimate.
