= Creatures Inc. =

Japanese video game developer

- Logo used since 2025

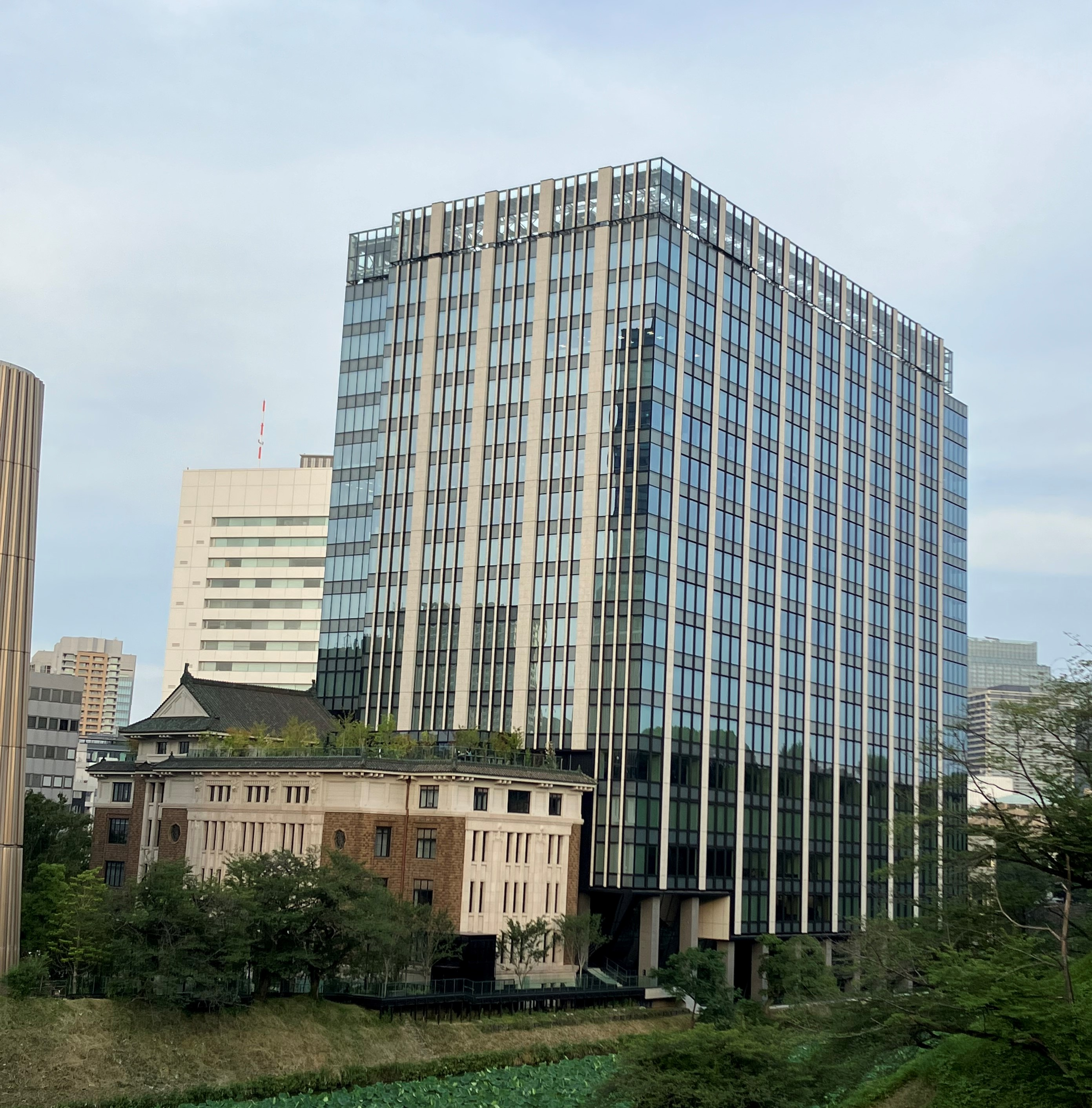
- Headquarters in the Kudan-Kaikan Terrace building in Chiyoda, Tokyo, Japan
- Native name: 株式会社クリーチャーズ
- Romanized name: Kabushiki gaisha Kurīchāzu
- Type: Private
- Industry: Video games
- Genre: Video game development; Trading cards
- Predecessor: Ape Inc.
- Founded: Ape Inc.; March 1989; 37 years ago in Tokyo, Japan; Creatures Inc.; November 8, 1995; 30 years ago in Tokyo, Japan
- Founder: Ape Inc.; Shigesato Itoi; Creatures Inc.; Tsunekazu Ishihara
- Headquarters: Kudan-Kaikan Terrace, 1-6-5 Kudanminami, Chiyoda, Tokyo, Japan
- Number of locations: 1 (2019)
- Key people: Yuji Kitano (president and CEO); Tomotaka Komura (vice president); Hirokazu Tanaka (Creative Fellow)
- Products: Games
- Brands: Pokémon Trading Card Game
- Number of employees: 296 (2026)
- Divisions: Pokémon CG Studio
- Website: www.creatures.co.jp

Creatures Inc. (Note: Japanese: 株式会社クリーチャーズ, Hepburn: Kabushiki-gaisha Kurīchāzu) is a Japanese video game company. It is best known for being affiliated with Game Freak and Nintendo, and is one of the owners of the Pokémon franchise. It was founded by Tsunekazu Ishihara in November 1995, with the assistance of then-president of HAL Laboratory, Satoru Iwata, as a successor to Shigesato Itoi's company Ape Inc.

Alongside Game Freak and Nintendo, Creatures established and jointly own The Pokémon Company.

It is best known for developing the Pokémon Trading Card Game and designing Pokémon toys. Creatures operates the Pokémon CG Studio, which focuses on the 3D modelling and animation of Pokémon models in all Pokémon games. Creatures has also developed Pokémon spin-off titles and various non-Pokémon titles. The company has its headquarters in Chiyoda, Tokyo, in proximity to Kudanshita Station.

== History ==
=== 1989–1995: Ape Inc. ===
Ape Inc. was founded in March 1989 with Shigesato Itoi as its chief executive officer (CEO). Nintendo president Hiroshi Yamauchi had wanted to support new talent in game design. Liking Itoi's work, he proposed the idea of the company to Itoi and invested in it. Ape's staff included Tsunekazu Ishihara, who later became The Pokémon Company's president, and Ashura Benimaru Itoh, a renowned illustrator. They began working on Mother, which was released on 27 July 1989. Its music was composed by Hirokazu Tanaka, who later became the second CEO of Creatures. The team went on to develop Mother 2, which would be known in the Western world as EarthBound. When development of this game began to falter, Satoru Iwata of HAL Laboratory was brought in to help the project. The game was released in Japan on 27 August 1994. Ape's game development activities ceased in 1995.

Ape also produced a line of official guidebooks for Nintendo, in co-operation with Nintendo and Shogakukan. They began with Encyclopedia Mother in October 1989, and ended with Nintendo Official Guidebook—Pocket Monsters: Red, Green, Blue (Complete Compatibility, Revised Edition) on 10 January 1997. Shogakukan assumed Ape's role and continues to produce Nintendo Official Guidebooks in their stead.

=== 1995–present: Creatures Inc. ===
Creatures Inc. was established on 8 November 1995, with Tsunekazu Ishihara as CEO, and consisting of former staff from Ape. In 2000, Hirokazu Tanaka, a.k.a. Hip Tanaka, a former Nintendo composer and sound designer, who joined Creatures in 1999, became President of the company as Ishihara went to become the President of The Pokémon Company in 2000, while still holding his CEO position in Creatures.

At one point, Creatures had its headquarters on the 7th floor of the Nintendo Kanda Building (任天堂神田ビル, Nintendō Kanda Biru) in Sudachō, Chiyoda, Tokyo. They later moved to the fifth floor annex of the Kawasakiteitoku Building (川崎定徳ビル, Kawasakiteitoku Biru) in Nihonbashi, Chūō, Tokyo, and again to the 10th floor of the Gorbanchō-ku Building (五番町KUビル, Gobanmachi KU Biru) in Gobanchō in 2007. They moved into the 23rd floor of the Iidabashi Grand Bloom (飯田橋グラン・ブルーム, Īdabashi Guran Burūmu) building in Fujimi in 2017, and once again moved to the 9th floor the Kudan-Kaikan Terrace (九段会館テラス, Kudankaikan Terasu) building located in Kudanminami in 2022.

Creatures has a division called Pokémon CG Studio that is dedicated solely to making Pokémon 3D models and animations. They only make the models and animations for the Pokémon themselves, as human characters are modeled and animated in-house at Game Freak. The studio as of 2017 had 22 full time 3DCG artists, however according to studio director Atsuko Ujiya they wanted to double it in the following years. She states that during its peak workload they have around 100 employees (including temporary contractors) to work on the creation of models and animations. In 2019, the division moved out from its office from the 3rd floor of the Fujimi Duplex Biz (富士見デュープレックスビズ, Fujimi Dyūpurekkusu Bizu) in Fujimi back to Creatures' main headquarters.

On 16 October 2020, Creatures announced the acquisition of Ambrella, the developer of a number of Pokémon spin-off games. Creatures acquired all property rights of Ambrella, and Ambrella disbanded, with its employees becoming part of Creatures.

In April 2023, Creatures announced that Tsunekazu Ishihara has stepped down at his position as CEO and executive director, and Hirokazu Tanaka has stepped down as president and executive director. Ishihara continues as the President of The Pokémon Company, and will continue to commit to the management of the company as a founder, while Tanaka will remain as Creative fellow. Yuji Kitano assume Creatures as CEO and President; meanwhile, Tomotaka Komura will step into the role of Executive vice president.

== Games ==
Ape/Creatures has developed or has contributed to the development of the following games.

= developer
= co-developer
= assistant developer

=== Ape ===
Year	Title	Platform	Developer	Role	Notes
1989	Mother	Famicom	Nintendo Tokyo R&D Products	Co-developer	Initially Japan only. Re-released worldwide in 2015 as EarthBound Beginnings.
1993	Monopoly	Super Famicom	CreamSoft	Co-developer	Japan only.
1993	Sanrio World Smash Ball!	Super Famicom	Tomcat System	Co-developer	Japan only.
1994	EarthBound	Super NES	HAL Laboratory	Co-developer	Released as Mother 2 in Japan.
1995	Mario's Picross	Game Boy	Jupiter	Co-developer	
1995	Tamori's Picross	Super Famicom	Jupiter	Co-developer	Series of small games distributed over the Satellaview network, coinciding with a radio show by Japanese celebrity Tamori. Japan only.
1995	The Monopoly Game 2	Super Famicom	Tomcat System	Co-developer	Japan only.
1995	Mario's Super Picross	Super Famicom	Jupiter	Co-developer	Japan only.
2003	Mother 1+2	Game Boy Advance	Pax Softnica, HAL Laboratory	Porting	Compilation cartridge of Mother and Mother 2. Japan only.

=== Creatures ===
Year	Title	Platform	Developer	Role	Notes
1996	Picross 2	Game Boy	Jupiter	Co-developer	Japan only.
1997	Mini Yonku GB: Let's & Go!!	Game Boy	Jupiter	Co-developer	Based on mini yonku racing and a related manga and anime. Published by ASCII Corporation. Japan only.
1998	Game Boy Camera	Game Boy	Nintendo R&D1, Game Freak, Jupiter	Software co-development.	
1998	Pocket Monsters Stadium (Japanese version)	Nintendo 64	Nintendo EAD	Pokémon modeling.	Japan only.
1998	Hey You, Pikachu!	Nintendo 64	Ambrella	Pokémon modeling.	
1998	Pokémon Trading Card Game	Game Boy Color	Hudson	Planning, game design, card design.	
1999	Super Smash Bros.	Nintendo 64	HAL Laboratory	Pokémon modeling, opening design.	
1999	Pokémon Snap	Nintendo 64	HAL Laboratory	Part of 2D illustrations, Pokémon modeling.	
1999	Pokémon Stadium (international version)	Nintendo 64	Nintendo EAD	Part of 2D illustrations, Pokémon modeling.	Upgraded version of the original Pokémon Stadium. Released in Japan as Pokémon Stadium 2.
2000	Pokémon Stadium 2	Nintendo 64	Nintendo EAD	Pokémon modeling.	Released in Japan as Pokémon Stadium Gold Silver.
2001	Chee-Chai Alien	Game Boy Color	Creatures	Developer	Japan only.
2001	Pokémon Card GB2: GR-dan Sanjo!	Game Boy Color	Hudson	Planning, game design, card design.	Japan only. Subtitle is often translated as Here Comes Team GR!, and sometimes as The Invasion of Team GR!
2001	Super Smash Bros. Melee	GameCube	HAL Laboratory	Character, stage, and figure modeling. Opening movie design.	
2003	Pokémon Colosseum	GameCube	Genius Sonority	Pokémon modeling.	
2005	Nonono Puzzle Chailien	Game Boy Advance	Nintendo	Co-developer	Japan only. Chailien is sometimes spelled Chairian.
2005	Pokémon XD: Gale of Darkness	GameCube	Genius Sonority	Pokémon modeling.	
2006	Pokémon Ranger	Nintendo DS	HAL Laboratory	Assistant developer.	
2006	Project Hacker: Kakusei	Nintendo DS	Red Entertainment	Assistant developer.	Japan only.
2006	Pokémon Battle Revolution	Wii	Genius Sonority	Pokémon modeling.	
2007	Pokémon Battrio	Arcade	Tomy, AQ Interactive	Pokémon modeling, cabinet design.	Arcade cabinet. Japan only.
2008	Pokémon Ranger: Shadows of Almia	Nintendo DS	Creatures	Developer	
2008	Personal Trainer: Walking	Nintendo DS	Nintendo NSD, Engines	Software co-development.	
2009	PokéPark Wii: Pikachu's Adventure	Wii	Creatures	Developer	
2010	Pokémon Ranger: Guardian Signs	Nintendo DS	Creatures	Developer	
2011	Pokémon Card Game: How to Play DS	Nintendo DS	Zener Works	Co-developer	Instructional game on how to play the Pokémon Trading Card Game, included with a deck kit called the Beginning Set. Japan only.
2011	Pokédex 3D	Nintendo 3DS	Creatures	Developer	Free app. Discontinued after October 1, 2012.
2011	PokéPark 2: Wonders Beyond	Wii	Creatures	Developer	
2012	Pokémon Dream Radar	Nintendo 3DS	Game Freak	Co-developer	
2012	Pokédex 3D Pro	Nintendo 3DS	Creatures	Developer	Upgraded version of Pokédex 3D. Paid app, unlike its precursor.
2012	Pokédex for iOS	iOS	Creatures	Developer	Discontinued on November 30, 2015.
2013	Pokémon X and Y	Nintendo 3DS	Game Freak	Pokémon modeling.	
2014	Pokémon Omega Ruby and Alpha Sapphire	Nintendo 3DS	Game Freak	Pokémon modeling.	
2015	Pokkén Tournament	Arcade, Wii U	Bandai Namco Studios	Pokémon modeling.	
2016	Great Detective Pikachu: Birth of a New Duo	Nintendo 3DS	Creatures	Developer	
2016	Pokémon Duel	iOS, Android	Heroz	Pokémon modeling.	Discontinued on October 31, 2019.
2016	Pokémon Go	iOS, iPadOS, Android	Niantic	Pokémon modeling.	
2016	Pokémon Sun and Moon	Nintendo 3DS	Game Freak	Pokémon modeling.	
2017	Pokkén Tournament DX	Nintendo Switch	Bandai Namco Studios	Pokémon modeling.	
2018	Detective Pikachu	Nintendo 3DS	Creatures	Developer	
2018	Pokémon: Let's Go, Pikachu! and Let's Go, Eevee!	Nintendo Switch	Game Freak	Pokémon modeling.	
2019	Pokémon Sword and Shield	Nintendo Switch	Game Freak	Pokémon modeling.	
2022	Pokémon Legends: Arceus	Nintendo Switch	Game Freak	Pokémon modeling.	
2022	Pokémon Scarlet and Violet	Nintendo Switch	Game Freak	Pokémon modeling.	
2023	Detective Pikachu Returns	Nintendo Switch	Creatures	Developer	
2024	Pokémon Trading Card Game Pocket	iOS, Android	DeNA	Co-developer	

=== Canceled ===
2000	EarthBound 64	Nintendo 64	HAL Laboratory	Game Design, Graphics, Animation.	Canceled in 2000. Restarted development without the participation of Creatures as the GBA game Mother 3.
