= Joseph Tobin =

American anthropologist

Joseph Tobin (born 1950) is the Elizabeth Garrard Hall Professor of Education in the College of Education at the University of Georgia.

== Biography ==
Tobin received his B.A. Degree from Earlham College and his PhD in Human Development at the University of Chicago. As a Japan Foundation Fellow, he studied in Tokyo with the Japanese psychoanalyst Takeo Doi who had great influence on his work. Tobin is married and has two sons.

== Work ==
Tobin is an educational anthropologist and an early childhood education specialist. His research interests include cross-cultural studies of early childhood education, immigration, children and the media, and qualitative research methods. He is known for his books and video documentaries Preschool in Three Cultures: Japan, China, and the United States (1989) and Preschool in Three Cultures Revisited (2009). His other books include Good Guys Don't Wear Hats: Children's Talk about the Media; Remade in Japan; Making a Place for Pleasure in Early Childhood Education; and Pikachu's Global Adventure: The Rise and Fall of Pokémon. Tobin also led a major international project: Children Crossing Borders: Immigrant Parent and Staff Perspectives on Preschool and is currently leading the project: Deaf Kindergartens in Three Countries: Japan, France, and the United States.

== Publications ==
- "Preschool in Three Cultures: China, Japan, and the United States," Joseph J. Tobin, David Y.H. Wu, Dana H. Davidson, 1991, ISBN 978-0300048124
- "Preschool in Three Cultures Revisited: China, Japan, and the United States," Joseph Tobin, Yeh Hsueh, and Mayumi Karasawa, 2011, ISBN 978-0226805047
- "Teaching Embodied: Cultural Practice in Japanese Preschools," Akiko Hayashi and Joseph Tobin, 2015, ISBN 978-0226263076
