= Detective Pikachu (video game) =

2016 video game

- Developer: Creatures
- Publishers: JP: The Pokémon Company; WW: Nintendo
- Director: Naoki Miyashita
- Producers: Hiroyuki Jinnai; Hitoshi Yamagami
- Programmers: Katsunori Orimoto; Jun Kanda; Tomofusa Shimamura
- Artist: Masataka Hata
- Writers: Tomokazu Ohara; Haruka Utsui
- Composer: Takuto Kitsuta
- Series: Detective Pikachu; Pokémon
- Platform: Nintendo 3DS
- Release: Birth of a New Duo: JP: February 3, 2016; Detective Pikachu: WW: March 23, 2018
- Genre: Adventure
- Mode: Single-player

Detective Pikachu (known in Japan as Great Detective Pikachu) is an adventure game developed by Creatures Inc. and published by Nintendo and The Pokémon Company for the Nintendo 3DS family of systems. The game is a spin-off of the Pokémon franchise, in which the player works with a talking Pikachu to solve various mysteries. A shorter, downloadable version of the game called Great Detective Pikachu: Birth of a New Duo was released in Japan in February 2016, while the full version was released worldwide in March 2018.

In contrast to previous Pokémon role-playing games, Detective Pikachu is an adventure game spin-off focusing on narrative storytelling, with a presentation comparable to the Pokémon anime series. A live-action film adaptation was released in May 2019. That same year, a sequel, Detective Pikachu Returns, was announced for the Nintendo Switch and was released on October 6, 2023.

== Plot ==
The game begins with a peculiar talking Pikachu, who claims to be a great detective. One day, Pikachu encounters a boy named Tim Goodman, who can understand what he is saying. They are immediately put to the test by retrieving a stolen necklace from thieving Aipom. Afterwards, they head to Baker Detective Agency and meet Mike Baker and secretary Amanda Blackstone, both of whom were close to Harry Goodman, Tim's father and Pikachu's owner. Harry had gone missing following a mysterious car crash that happened at the same time Pikachu got amnesia. Tim and Pikachu deduce that Harry was last seen trying to investigate Litwick Cave, and arrive just in time to rescue GNN reporter Meiko Okamoto and her assistant Emilia Christie from a rampaging Glalie, who seems to not remember why it was attacking to begin with.

After escaping, Tim and Pikachu trace a clue to the Pokémon Comprehensive Laboratory. Posing as interns, they are introduced to the staff and are reunited with Emilia and Meiko, who together end up having to solve another rampaging Pokémon incident. They learn that employee Carlos Hernando had created a drug called "R" and has been using it to induce the rampages. After his arrest following an attempt to use R to chase them off, they learn that R was actually created by Dr. Waals, who now lives on Cappucci Island, but upon arriving learn that he is under arrest by overzealous lieutenant Brad McMaster for a supposed dangerous Pokémon that has been attacking the native wildlife. With Tim and Pikachu's help, they catch the real culprit, a tourist director who just wants to possess Dr. Waals' home and clear Waals' name. Waals reveals that R was supposed to be a miracle drug using the DNA of Mew, but by mistake, the DNA came from Mewtwo, who has a "berserk gene" that causes the rampaging Pokémon.

At Waals' advice, Tim and Pikachu head to the abandoned Fine Park where the first rampage occurred with a Charizard. The native Pokémon bring forth a locket that belonged to Harry and learn from a Buneary that a Skorupi had attacked him, resulting in him crashing his car. Tim and Pikachu head to the GNN building to meet with Meiko about the Fine Park footage of Charizard's rampage. When she leaves to go get it, Tim and Pikachu get involved in another mystery involving a down-on-his-luck comedian trying to steal a violin from a competitor from a show he's hosting. They finally get to see the footage and discover that GNN assistant director Keith Norman had used a Skorupi to release R on Charizard at the park. Found out, Keith makes his escape on a Noivern, but Pikachu discovers that the locket left by Harry is actually a hidden camera full of photos taken from Ryme Wharf.

Upon arriving, Tim and Pikachu spot a couple of shifty wharf employees and realize that they are keeping Waals' former assistant Simon Yen prisoner, and have been forcing him to mass-produce R. Pikachu suddenly remembers that he made a promise to Mewtwo to stop the creation of R, and Yen sneaks Tim and Pikachu onto the S.S. Prime Treasure, where R is apparently being sent. By coincidence, they run into Emilia and get caught up in another side mystery involving a stolen mask. Afterwards, they learn that a secret black market auction is happening and take part in it, discovering that Keith is there trying to sell R. They manage to catch him. As Tim and Emilia have a moment, Pikachu speaks privately with Mewtwo, who reveals that his promise is not over and that he still needs him to get rid of his cells. After looking through Keith's things they learn he is working for someone at GNN, and that they plan to release R during the Pokémon carnival.

Tim, Pikachu and Emilia race back to the Baker Agency to inform them about the clues they have gathered. Realizing that the culprit plans to release R at Central Square during a parade, the group split up to look for clues. They capture and arrest a mysterious man in a yellow hat, but realize that R will be distributed from the clock tower, and find a large machine that they are able to successfully disarm. At that point, they realize that the culprit is GNN boss Roger Clifford, due to his mentioning that Pikachu does not have powers (something that only Keith knew). Roger reveals himself with Emilia as his hostage. He explains that he wanted to use R as a way to report on its disaster in Ryme City, making GNN more powerful and leading to them having total control of information. Tim and Pikachu rescue Emilia and defeat Roger and his Noivern, with Pikachu regaining his powers at the last second. As Roger is taken away, Pikachu meets with Mewtwo to return the last of his cells. Pikachu then "makes a decision" and is put to sleep by Mewtwo. The next morning, Tim and Pikachu set off to look for Harry.

== Gameplay ==
Detective Pikachu is an adventure game in which players control Tim Goodman as he works together with Detective Pikachu to solve various mysteries. This is accomplished by walking around scenes, finding potential clues, and speaking with people and Pokémon to uncover new information.

== Development ==
Development on Detective Pikachu was handled by Creatures Inc. and began in mid-2013. After development finished on PokePark, the team thought about what kind of game to make next and set sights on creating an adventure game, which had not been done with Pokémon spin-off titles yet. However, just trying to create a normal one did not seem very interesting, so while considering various ideas the team thought of the element of a “talking middle-aged man Pikachu” and this led to the creation of Detective Pikachu.

The game was first revealed in October 2013 during an episode of the Japanese television show The Professionals as part of a profile on The Pokémon Company CEO Tsunekazu Ishihara. NHK, the show's television network, leaked some information about the game on its website in advance of the show's airing. During The Professionals episode, it was mentioned that a blue Pikachu would appear in the game. Later that year, Nintendo filed a trademark for the name Great Detective Pikachu. The developers released a debut trailer in late January 2016, a week before the game's launch.

The decision to include voice acting was made by Junichi Masuda, who served as the series' director and composer and wanted to have a talking Pikachu. In a 2018 interview, Masuda and Creatures Inc. revealed that the original intention for the anime was to have the Pokémon talk, but the show's producer OLM, Inc. was unable to come up with a concept that Game Freak were accepting of. In the game, Pikachu wears a deerstalker, taking inspiration from popular depictions of Sherlock Holmes.

== Release ==
The game's initial version, called Great Detective Pikachu: Birth of a New Duo (名探偵ピカチュウ 〜新コンビ誕生〜, Meitantei Pikachu ~Shin Konbi Tanjō~), was released on the Nintendo 3DS eShop in Japan on February 3, 2016. On January 12, 2018, this version of the game was removed from the eShop in Japan, and later that day it was announced that an expanded version of the game, simply titled Detective Pikachu, was scheduled for a physical Nintendo 3DS release worldwide on March 23, 2018. This version of the game featured nine chapters of the story, as opposed to the three of the original release.

On March 9, 2018, a Special Demo Version of the full game was released for free on the Nintendo 3DS eShop in Japan. The demo featured the first half of the first chapter of the game and allowed players to transfer their progress to the full game. This demo was later released in the West on April 5, 2018. Similarly, Japanese players who had completed the original download version of the game were able to start playing the full version from where they left off upon release. The game was released alongside a giant Detective Pikachu amiibo figure, which unlocks hints and optional cutscenes in the game.

Following the Japanese release of the game, dedicated fans started a petition requesting American actor Danny DeVito as the English voice actor for the titular character. The petition gained 40,000 signatures, but DeVito declined to audition for the role saying he'd never even heard of Pokémon.

To promote the release of the full version of the game, The Pokémon Company released a free promotional eBook called Detective Pikachu Episode 0 – Eevee's Case, available until May 15, 2018, on Apple's iBooks and Amazon's Kindle stores. The short story acts as a prequel to the game, setting up its story. The book was originally released in physical form as a pre-order bonus for the game in Japan. Alongside this, a set of stickers was also released for free on iMessage and Line on the same day.

== Reception ==
=== Critical response ===
Reception

Aggregate scores
Aggregator	Score
Metacritic	71/100
OpenCritic	33% recommend

Review scores
Publication	Score
Destructoid	6/10
Edge	6/10
Electronic Gaming Monthly	6/10
Famitsu	8/10, 9/10, 8/10, 8/10
Game Informer	7.25/10
GameSpot	7/10
IGN	8.2/10
Nintendo Life	8/10
Nintendo World Report	7.5/10

Detective Pikachu received "mixed or average" reviews from critics, according to review aggregator platform Metacritic. Fellow review aggregator OpenCritic assessed that the game received fair approval, being recommended by 33% of critics.

IGN gave the game a "great" score of 8.2 out of 10, calling it "a bold take on the iconic Pokemon, which succeeds thanks to Pika Prompts that build Pikachu beyond detective stereotypes" and concluded that it "gives great insight into the world of Pokemon through its fun mysteries and wonderful coffee-loving lead." Ryan Craddock of Nintendo Life also gave the game a "great" score of 8 out of 10, stating that while the game was quite easy with no real penalty for incorrect decisions, "the game's art, storytelling, and genuinely likable cast [showed] the world of Pokémon in a great new light". There was also praise given to the game's "gorgeous" visuals and the character of Detective Pikachu himself.

Several critics felt the story would work better as a film than as a game. Eurogamer noted the game is more similar to the Pokémon anime series than previous Pokémon video games, and compared it to the Ace Attorney series of adventure games.

The game was nominated for "Nintendo Game of the Year" at the Golden Joystick Awards, and for "Game, Franchise Family" at the National Academy of Video Game Trade Reviewers Awards.

=== Sales ===
In Japan, the game sold 121,423 units, including 94,203 retail sales and 27,220 digital eShop sales. On North America's NPD charts, it was the top-selling 3DS game in March 2018, and one of the top ten 3DS games during June–July 2018. On the UK's multi-platform charts, it debuted at number 23 in its first week during March 2018, before rising to number 15 the following week with a 76% sales increase. It was also number 12 on the UK's 3DS platform chart in November 2018.

== Film adaptation ==
A live-action film based around the Detective Pikachu character by Warner Bros. Pictures was released on May 10, 2019, and grossed $450 million worldwide. It was directed by Rob Letterman, and stars Justice Smith, Kathryn Newton, Suki Waterhouse, Omar Chaparro, Chris Geere, Ken Watanabe and Bill Nighy, with Ryan Reynolds as the voice of Pikachu. The film began pre-production in 2017, and was filmed in London in 2018.

== Sequel ==
Weeks after the film adaptation's release, the Pokémon Company announced in a press conference that a Detective Pikachu sequel is being developed for the Nintendo Switch, and that it would feature a different resolution from what the film version portrayed. In June 2023, the sequel's title was officially announced as Detective Pikachu Returns, and it released on October 6, 2023.
