= Detective Pikachu Returns =

2023 video game

- Promotional artwork
- Developer: Creatures
- Publishers: JP: The Pokémon Company; WW: Nintendo
- Directors: Yasunori Yanagisawa; Katsuyoshi Irie
- Producers: Masamichi Anazawa; Akira Kinashi; Shinya Saito
- Designers: Akihito Joguchi; Yuki Yamada; Miki Obata
- Programmer: Kenichi Kato
- Artist: Atsushi Watanabe
- Writer: Hiroyuki Jinnai
- Composer: Takuto Kitsuta
- Series: Detective Pikachu; Pokémon
- Engine: Unity
- Platform: Nintendo Switch
- Release: October 6, 2023
- Genre: Adventure
- Mode: Single-player

Detective Pikachu Returns (Note: Japanese: 帰ってきた名探偵ピカチュウ, Hepburn: Kaettekita Meitantei Pikachū) is a 2023 adventure game developed by Creatures and published by the Pokémon Company and Nintendo for the Nintendo Switch. It is a sequel to 2016's Detective Pikachu for the Nintendo 3DS. First announced during a press release in 2019 alongside apps such as Pokémon Home, it was first showcased during a Nintendo Direct in June 2023 before being released on October 6, 2023.

== Plot ==
Two years after Tim Goodman and Detective Pikachu solved the case behind the R incidents, and in the midst of their search for Tim's missing father, Harry, they are invited to be awarded medals for their continued detective work by Ryme City's mayor, Martin Myers, who hopes to initiate the inaugural Pokémon Friendship Week to redefine the harmony and coexistence between humans and Pokémon, following a recent rise in Pokémon-related incidents. However, a frenzied Corviknight interrupts the ceremony. After the two briefly help a wild Pidove knocked out from the chaos, they are called by Inspector Holiday to investigate the theft of a priceless jewel, the Aurora Drop, at an estate owned by jeweler Sanjeev Denis.

At the Denis estate, the Ryme City police accuse Sanjeev's trusted friend and butler Brandon Barnes as a suspect. Believing Barnes has an alibi, Tim and Pikachu investigate, and with some help from Sanjeev's Growlithe, Tim exposes the recent hire, Larry Turner, as the culprit, proven by a note written by him that reveals his plan to frame Barnes, hiding the stolen jewel in the belly of his Pokémon, a Cramorant. However, upon Pikachu noticing a strange device on Cramorant's back, it swallows the jewel and flies away, with Turner denying any further involvement.

After Tim invites his classmate Rachel for dinner with his visiting mother Irene and sister Sophia, Pikachu suddenly faints, recounting a conversation between Harry and Irene, the former deciding to file for divorce before leaving. Once Pikachu awakens, he and Tim are visited by Mewtwo, who reveals that the recent uptick of Pokémon incidents is not caused by R, but from something else, as well as preparing to disclose intel on Harry. Before explaining further, Mewtwo is attacked by a swarm of Beedrill, wearing the same mysterious devices.

The next day, Tim and Pikachu join Rachel to meet her professor, Trevor Gordon, at some mysterious ruins south from Ryme City, hoping to gain more information on the Aurora Drop. After discovering that Gordon had entered the ruins two days prior and hasn't returned since, the three investigate the temple's puzzles and solve the mysterious riddles. Along the way, they sneak past a Galarian Darmanitan protecting the area, soon finding Gordon trapped inside a mysterious room from a cave-in. Pikachu enters the room alone to help him and decides to befriend Darmanitan and use its strength to break through the debris.

With Gordon free, he decides to stay longer, resolved into his research, not before explaining to Tim the ruins' significance into strengthening the bonds of humans and Pokémon, but reveals that the Aurora Drop itself may be a Pokémon that hailed from space.

After an encounter with a masked man and his Mamoswine, Tim, Pikachu and Rachel escape the temple, and on their way home, the former two see Mewtwo escaping from the Beedrill, carrying Harry's unconscious body with him. The next day, Pikachu, along with several other Pokémon, end up arrested by authorities for crimes they didn't commit. While Tim investigates the recent incidents, Pikachu meets and later allies with the other detained Pokémon, where he and Tim expose the deputy as a criminal after finding evidence of him planning to traffic the Pokémon for money. In the midst of the investigation, Tim reveals his ability to understand Pikachu to Rachel, who wholeheartedly believes him.

== Development and release ==
The game was first announced during a press release in 2019 as an unnamed sequel to Detective Pikachu for the Nintendo 3DS. It was officially announced in during a Nintendo Direct in June 2023, with a release date of October 6, 2023. A trailer was released detailing gameplay and some plot details on August 8, 2023.

A tie-in anime short, titled Detective Pikachu & the Mystery of the Missing Flan, from Polygon Pictures was released on YouTube on October 25, 2023.

== Reception ==
Reception

Aggregate scores
Aggregator	Score
Metacritic	66/100
OpenCritic	27% recommend

Review scores
Publication	Score
Eurogamer	6/10
Famitsu	31/40
Game Informer	7.25/10
GameSpot	6/10
GamesRadar+	3/5
IGN	6/10
Nintendo Life	7/10

Detective Pikachu Returns received "mixed or average" reviews from critics, according to review aggregator platform Metacritic. Fellow review aggregator OpenCritic assessed that the game received fair approval, being recommended by 27% of critics.

Detective Pikachu Returns was the bestselling retail game throughout its first week of release in Japan, with 85,639 physical copies being sold across the country.
