= Pokémon =

Japanese media franchise

- International franchise logo
- Created by: Satoshi Tajiri
- Original work: Pocket Monsters Red and Pocket Monsters Green (1996)
- Owner: The Pokémon Company (Note: Joint venture between Nintendo, Creatures, and Game Freak, who jointly own the copyright, as well as the trademark. The anime series is co-owned with TV Tokyo, ShoPro, and JR Kikaku. The anime films are owned by Pikachu Project, a joint venture between The Pokémon Company, TV Tokyo, and ShoPro.)
- Years: 1996–present

Print publications
- Comics: See list of Pokémon manga

Films and television
- Films: See list of Pokémon films
- Animated series: Pokémon (1997–present)

Games
- Traditional: Pokémon Trading Card Game
- Video game: Pokémon video game series

Official website
- Official hub

Pokémon (Note: Pronunciation: /ˈpoʊkəmɒn/ POH-kə-mon, US also /-ki-, -keɪ-/ -kee-, -kay-.) (Note: Japanese: ポケモン, Hepburn: Pokemon) is a Japanese media franchise consisting of video games, animated series and films, a trading card game, and other related media. The franchise takes place in a shared universe in which humans co-exist with the eponymous creatures, a large variety of species endowed with special powers. The franchise's primary target audience is children aged 5 to 12, but it is known to attract people of all ages. (Note: Attributed to multiple references:) Pokémon is estimated to be the world's highest-grossing media franchise, with the video games in particular being among the best-selling.

The franchise originated as a pair of role-playing games developed by Game Freak, from an original concept by its founder, Satoshi Tajiri. Released on the Game Boy on 27 February 1996, the games became sleeper hits and were followed by manga series, a trading card game, and anime series and films. From 1998 to 2000, Pokémon was exported to the rest of the world, creating an unprecedented global phenomenon dubbed "Pokémania". By 2002, the craze had ended, after which Pokémon became a fixture in popular culture, with new products releasing to this day. In 2016, the franchise spawned a second craze with the release of the AR game Pokémon Go, developed by Niantic.

The franchise is managed by the Pokémon Company (TPC), which was established in 2000 (Note: The Pokémon Company was established in 1998 as Pokémon Center Co. Ltd., but they only served to operate Pokémon Center stores prior to the company's restructuring and renaming in 2000.) by the joint owners of the franchise: original video game series publisher Nintendo, Trading Card Game developer Creatures, and Game Freak. The three companies also own the anime series alongside TV Tokyo, ShoPro, and JR Kikaku, and Pikachu Project, a joint venture between The Pokémon Company, TV Tokyo, and ShoPro, owns the anime films. Since 2009, The Pokémon Company International (TPCi), a subsidiary of TPC, has managed the franchise in all regions outside Asia.

== Name ==
The original full name of the franchise is Pocket Monsters (ポケットモンスター, Poketto Monsutā), which has been commonly abbreviated to Pokemon (ポケモン) since its launch. When the franchise was released internationally, the short form of the title was used, with an acute accent (´) over the e to aid in pronunciation.

Pokémon refers to both the franchise itself and the eponymous creatures. As a noun, it is identical in both the singular and plural, as is every individual species name. Thus, it is grammatically correct to say "one Pokémon" and "many Pokémon", as well as "one Pikachu" and "many Pikachu".

== General concept ==
The Pokémon franchise takes place in a shared universe in which humans co-exist with creatures known as Pokémon. The original pair of games feature 151 Pokémon species, with new ones being added in subsequent games; as of early 2026, 1,025 Pokémon species have been introduced. (Note: This count excludes Mega Evolutions, Dynamax, Gigantamax, regional variants, and other forms. These are not considered separate species of Pokémon, but variations of existing ones.) Most Pokémon are based on real-life animals or mythical creatures from folklore. For example, Pikachu are a yellow, mouse-like species with tails shaped as lightning bolts, able to blast powerful electric charges through the air.

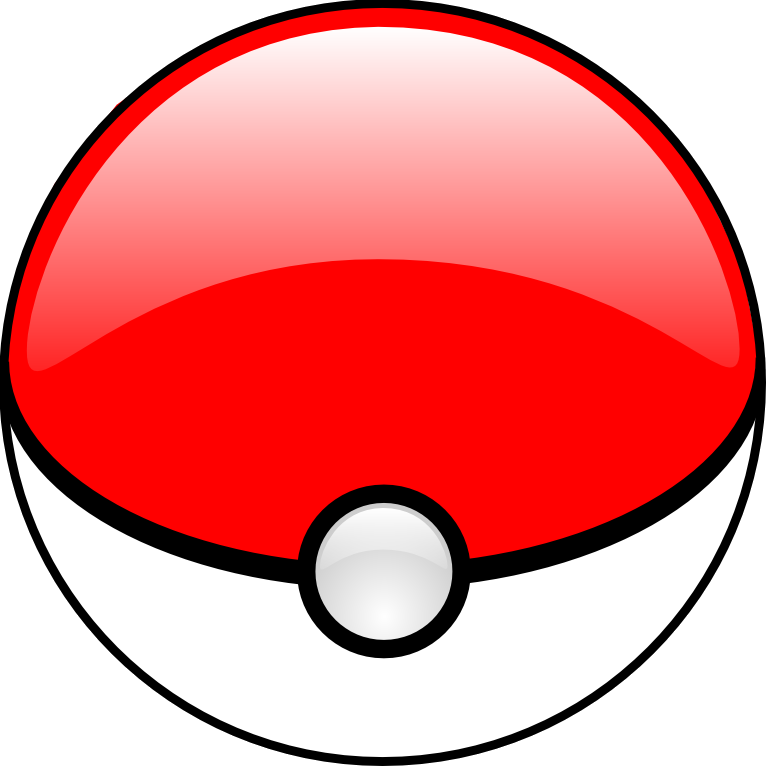
Poké Balls are used to capture Pokémon.

A battle in Pokémon Black and White

The player character takes the role of a Pokémon Trainer. The Trainer has three primary aims: travel and explore the Pokémon world; discover and catch a specimen of each Pokémon species in order to complete their Pokédex; and train a team of Pokémon and have them engage in battles. Most Pokémon can be caught with spherical devices known as Poké Balls. Once the opposing Pokémon is sufficiently weakened, the Trainer throws the Poké Ball against the Pokémon, which is then transformed into a form of energy and transported into the device. If the catch is successful, the Pokémon is tamed and under the Trainer's command from then on. If the Poké Ball is thrown again, the Pokémon re-materializes into its original state. The Trainer's Pokémon can engage in battles against opposing Pokémon, including those in the wild or owned by other Trainers. Because the franchise is aimed at children, these battles are never presented as overtly violent and contain no blood or gore. (Note: Attributed to multiple references:) Pokémon never die in battle – they faint upon being defeated, and can then be rejuvenated at a Pokémon Center. (Note: Attributed to multiple references:)

== History ==
=== Origins ===
The main idea behind Pokémon was conceived by Satoshi Tajiri. Tajiri was born on 28 August 1965, and grew up in Machida, a suburb of Tokyo. As a child, he enjoyed discovering and catching insects and other small creatures in the various ponds and fields that surrounded his town. During Japan's economic miracle, many cities, including Machida, were significantly expanded. As a consequence, Machida's nature was largely destroyed. In his second year of junior high school, an arcade hall opened in Tajiri's neighborhood, introducing him to video games. While studying electrical engineering at Tokyo College of Technology, Tajiri began publishing a doujinshi magazine titled Game Freak. The title was inspired by the 1932 film Freaks, which Tajiri was fascinated with at the time. He self-published the first issue of the magazine in March 1983, at the age of 17. At the time, magazines specializing in video games did not yet exist in Japan, allowing Game Freak to fill a gap in the market. Sometime later, Tajiri was contacted by aspiring manga artist Ken Sugimori, who became Game Freak's illustrator. Game Freak folded in the late 1980s, by which point Tajiri had become a respected game journalist in Japan's fledgling video game industry. Through his work, Tajiri befriended Tsunekazu Ishihara, a Japanese business man who, among other things, produced game-related shows for Fuji Television.

In 1986, Tajiri, Sugimori, and a few other enthusiasts started an informal development team called Game Freak, named after the magazine it grew out of. Over the next few years, they independently developed the puzzle game Quinty, working on it alongside school or their regular jobs. No one within the group knew how to make the game's music. After consulting all his contacts, Tajiri got in touch with Junichi Masuda, who became the group's composer. Quinty was finished in 1989, and published by Namco. Tajiri officially incorporated Game Freak Co., Ltd. on 26 April 1989.

=== 1989–1995: Development of Red and Green ===
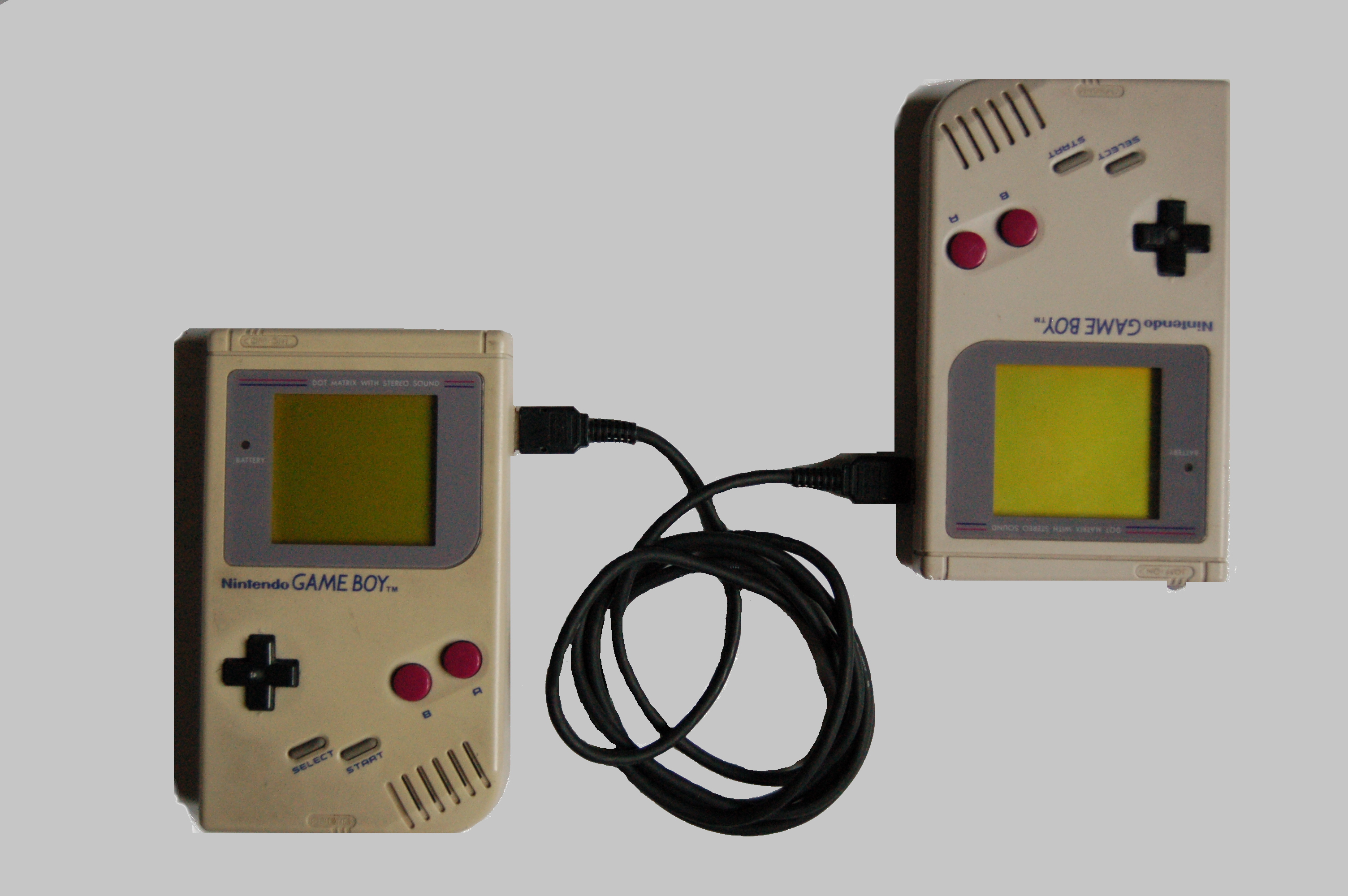
Two original Game Boys connected with a Game Link Cable

Tajiri started to think of what was to become Pokémon while completing Quinty, and before he officially founded Game Freak. Around this time, Nintendo announced the upcoming release of the Game Boy. Tajiri learned that the device would have a link port, and with the corresponding Game Link Cable, two Game Boys could be linked together. Sometime later, Tajiri remembered an incident while playing Dragon Quest II (1987), a role-playing game (RPG) for the Famicom (NES). The game features randomly appearing items of varying rarity, including an extremely rare item called Mysterious Hat. (Note: In Dragon Quest II, the item is called ふしぎなぼうし, Fushigina Bōshi, i.e. Mysterious Hat. The Japanese Pokemon RPGs feature an item called ふしぎなアメ, Fushigina Ame, i.e. Mysterious Candy. This item raises the level of a Pokemon by one. In the English games, it is called Rare Candy.) Tajiri did not encounter any, while Ken Sugimori, who was also playing the game, encountered two. Upon recalling this experience, Tajiri realized that the cable now made it possible to transfer things from one cartridge to another. (Note: Attributed to multiple references:) He noted that, until then, the Game Link Cable was only used for competing, but not for something else. Combining this inspiration with his memories of catching insects and other small species, Tajiri's idea would eventually evolve into a virtual recreation of his boyhood experiences, and an attempt to "regain the world that he had lost". He would later state that the game represents "the story of a boy's summer day".

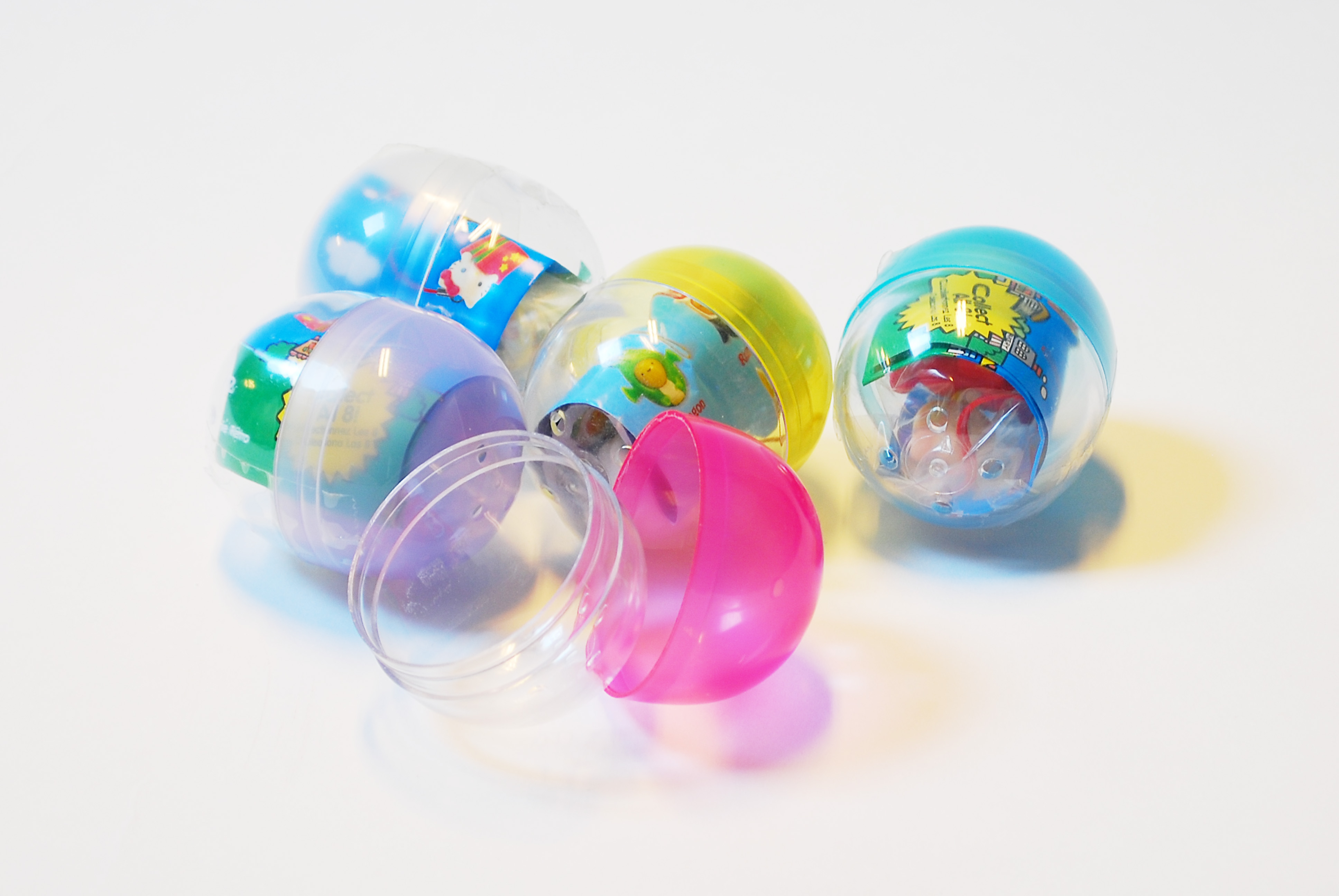
Gashapon capsules have been cited as an inspiration for Pokémon.

Tajiri and his Game Freak staff began pondering over a game centered on capturing creatures of differing rarity. Since the Game Boy is a portable device, these creatures could then be exchanged with other players in real life using the link cable. Once the player has caught a creature in-game, it was to be stored in miniaturized form in a special capsule. This facet of the game was inspired by Ultraseven, a tokusatsu show that Tajiri had enjoyed as a child. The series' titular character owns a number of capsules containing miniaturized kaiju (monsters), which come out and return to their original sizes when the capsule is thrown into mid-air. Kaiju media in general were an important influence on Pokémon, as many Game Freak staff members had grown up with them. Other influences that have been cited by Tajiri include: gashapon, capsules with toy figures in them that can be drawn from vending machines; collectible cards, such as baseball cards, Ultraman cards and menko; (Note: Attributed to multiple references:) The Final Fantasy Legend (1989), the first RPG for the Game Boy; and pet culture in Japan, with Tajiri noting that having Pokémon is similar to having pets. Tajiri initially named his project Capsule Monsters, which Game Freak's staff commonly shortened to Capumon. However, it later turned out that the term Capsule Monsters could not be trademarked, and it was subsequently decided to call the game Pocket Monsters, which became Pokémon.

In March 1989, Nintendo and Shigesato Itoi co-founded Ape Inc., a company meant to give outside talent a chance to pitch new, innovative games. At the time, Ape was housed in the same Kanda-Sudachō office building as Nintendo, located in Tokyo. Ishihara, a friend of both Itoi and Tajiri, was involved with Ape's management (and would become its vice-president in 1991). Tajiri's relationship with Ishihara prompted Tajiri to present his idea for Pocket Monsters at Ape's office. Present during Tajiri's pitch was Takashi Kawaguchi, who worked at Nintendo's General Affairs Department and was also a manager at Ape. Kawaguchi brought the idea to Nintendo president Hiroshi Yamauchi, who reportedly said: "This is it. This is the idea I've been waiting for." The development contract was signed at the beginning of 1990, with a planned delivery of the game in October. Tajiri directed the project, working under Ishihara. Ishihara was the producer – he managed the budget, staff, and work schedule, monitored the game's overall progress, and served as a liaison between Game Freak and Nintendo. Ishihara also contributed ideas to the development, and helped with debugging. Sugimori was in charge of the graphics and character design. Masuda created all music and sound effects, and did part of the programming. The budget that Nintendo granted to Game Freak was low; thus, Pocket Monsters was initially planned as a small, compact game, based primarily around Tajiri's core idea of exchanging. As development progressed, Game Freak's ideas and ambitions for Pokémon grew. They soon realized that the game they were beginning to envision would not be easy to make. Pocket Monsters was suspended indefinitely, and Game Freak turned their focus on other titles (see Game Freak § Games).

After the game's initial development phase in 1990 and 1991, the staff "tinkered with it from time to time", as Sugimori put it. Still, development had mostly come to a halt until the summer of 1994, after the release of Pulseman, upon which Tajiri decided it was time to make a serious effort towards finishing Pocket Monsters. By this point, Game Freak's experience had grown considerably. Over the years, a number of new staff members had been added to the company. One of them was Atsuko Nishida, a graphic artist who created Pikachu, among others. Ishihara used his knowledge of card games to add more depth to the battle system, and among other things suggested Pokémon types. Ishihara also came up with the idea of the Pokedex, a portable encyclopedic device which players can use to keep track of the Pokémon they caught. On the suggestion of Shigeru Miyamoto, it was decided to release two editions of the game: a Red version and a Green version. Otherwise identical, each had Pokémon not found in the other, encouraging players to socialize and trade to complete their collection.

Ishihara aspired to create video games of his own. As Pocket Monsters Red and Green were nearing completion, Ishihara founded Creatures, Inc. on 8 November 1995. Co-ownership of the Pokémon property, which Ishihara helped create, was subsequently assigned to Creatures. This resulted in Pokémon having three legal owners: Game Freak, the main developer; Creatures, representing producer Ishihara; and Nintendo, the publisher. Anne Allison wrote that Nintendo also bought the property after Red and Green were finished. Journalist Kenji Hatakeyama noted that the ownership structure of Pokémon is uncommon. He wrote that "Pokémon is probably the only property in the world today for which the original rights are not concentrated in a single company", like The Walt Disney Company does with their IPs. Tajiri and Ishihara did consider merging Game Freak and Creatures at one point. Tajiri decided against it because he feared it would erase what he had built up since he was a teenager. "I felt threatened by the idea of changing how Game Freak was operating, and starting back over with Mr. Ishihara", he said. "It was an identity problem. If Game Freak ceased to exist, then so would I". Tajiri noted that, since Game Freak and Creatures both focus on Pokémon, it sometimes felt more like different departments than different companies.

=== 1996–1998: Rise in Japan ===
==== CoroCoro manga, Mew lottery ====
After finally being finished in December 1995, Pocket Monsters Red and Green were released on 27 February 1996. Nintendo had no high expectations of the games, and media largely ignored them. By 1996, the seven-year-old Game Boy console was considered dated and near the end of its lifecycle. On the other hand, new Game Boys continued to be manufactured and sold. The console was widespread and, due to its age, affordable to children.

Two media channels that would play important roles in the Pokémon franchise were the CoroCoro Comic, released monthly, and its sister magazine Bessatsu CoroCoro Comic, released bi-monthly. Both manga magazines are published by Shogakukan, a long-time business partner of Nintendo, and have featured manga based on Nintendo properties (e.g. Super Mario-kun, Kirby of the Stars, Donkey Kong). At the time of Pokémon's release, the main CoroCoro magazine was read by one in four elementary school students. CoroCoro's deputy editor-in-chief was Masakazu Kubo. On Ishihara's suggestion, Kubo commissioned the creation of a manga adaptation, written and illustrated by Kosaku Anakubo. Shogakukan, which frequently surveys their target groups, determined that the Pocket Monsters manga was well received.

To further promote Red and Green, the May issue of CoroCoro, released on 15 April 1996, announced the "Legendary Pokémon Offer", centered around a mysterious, secret Pokémon called Mew. Mew was a last-minute addition to Red and Green. It is unobtainable in the game(s) through usual means, and was intended to be used at a later point in some post-launch activity. To participate in the promotion, CoroCoro readers had to send in a postcard, and from the entrants, 20 were selected at random. The winners then had to send in their cartridge so that Mew could be uploaded onto it. The lottery was a success and increased word-of-mouth. By September, sales of Red and Green had surpassed 1 million units.

==== Trading Card Game ====
The Pokémon Trading Card Game was one of the first collectible card games (CCGs) developed in Japan. Its creation was influenced by Magic: The Gathering, the first CCG in history. Indeed, the Pokémon Trading Card Game can be considered a simplified version of Magic. First released in the United States in 1993, Magic had gained popularity not just in North America and Europe, but also in Asia. Ishihara was fond of playing cards, and had contributed to the development of at least three simple card games designed by Shigesato Itoi and released through Ape, Inc. (Note: Four original card games are known to have been designed by Itoi: Slot Brothers, Edoka, Hanamaru, and Rameka. The 1998 book The Secrets of Pokemon states that the last three games were contributed to by Ishihara.) At the time, Ishihara was particularly interested in Magic: The Gathering. While developing the Pokémon RPG, he realized that the concept behind it could be adapted into a Magic-like CCG. The Pokémon Trading Card Game was designed by Ishihara, Akihiko Miura, Kōichi Ōyama, and Takumi Akabane. All were former staff members of Ape, and had worked on EarthBound (1994).

While card games have a long history in Japan, a collectible card game was a relatively new concept there, and at the time not widely known. Because of this, Ishihara had difficulties finding distributors. Sometime in 1995, Ishihara pitched the card game to Nintendo. They agreed to have the cards manufactured, subcontracting an unidentified printing company. However, Nintendo did not want the hassle of having to develop a distribution system from the ground up, i.e. finding retailers willing to sell a CCG. Ishihara was then contacted by Satoshi Kayama, director of a small firm called Media Factory. Like Ishihara, Kayama was a fan of card games. He felt that CCGs would soon rise to prominence in Japan, and had been gathering information on the possibility of developing such a game in some form. When Kayama heard that Creatures had developed a CCG, he contacted Ishihara and offered to distribute it, signing the contract near the end of 1995. The first Pokémon card set was released on 20 October 1996. Despite being ignored by the media, except for CoroCoro, the cards became an instant success upon release.

==== Anime production and premiere ====
By August 1996, Kubo had become convinced of Pokémon's potential, and believed Shogakukan should create an anime adaptation. Nintendo felt reluctant, believing that the property had developed enough as it had over the course of six months. At that time, they did not consider such a significant expansion to be necessary. Nintendo also noted that if the anime flopped, it would negatively affect future Pokémon games. Ishihara initially opposed the idea, because he thought it would overly hasten the 'consumption' of the property: he feared that if the series ended, people would assume that Pokémon had ended, and move on to the next thing. At the time, Creatures and Game Freak were planning the sequel(s) to Red and Green, Pokémon Gold and Silver, and Ishihara did not want the anime to end before they could release their new games. Kubo was ultimately able to resolve the concerns of all parties involved. An important aspect of Kubo's bargaining power was the then-ongoing Mini 4WD craze and its accompanying hit series Bakusō Kyōdai Let's & Go!!. Kubo had an important role in the creation of both, which impressed the stakeholders. To appease Ishihara, Kubo promised him that the anime would last for at least a year and a half. This was unusually long for a debuting anime, and required a big investment. Kubo's proposal for Pocket Monsters was officially approved on 26 September 1996. For Nintendo in Japan, it was the first time they licensed a TV series. Kubo assigned independent producer Choji Yoshikawa to lead the project.

Shogakukan Productions, commonly called ShoPro, was Shogakukan's production company. The animation company they commissioned was OLM, Inc. (Oriental Light and Magic), on Kubo's suggestion. Kunihiko Yuyama, one of OLM's founding members, became the anime's director. ShoPro assembled a team of five writers, plus two supporting writers. All key people involved with the production of Pokémon were well-experienced and had proven track records within Japan's anime industry. Yoshikawa felt that the team got lucky. "The probability of so many great people coming together at the same time is very low", he said. Per Tajiri's explicit condition, every anime team member had to play the game extensively, including the illustrators and voice actors. The anime staff "unanimously agreed that the game was interesting" and "felt connected with each other through the world of Pokémon", feeling positively challenged to make an anime that would match the game's quality.

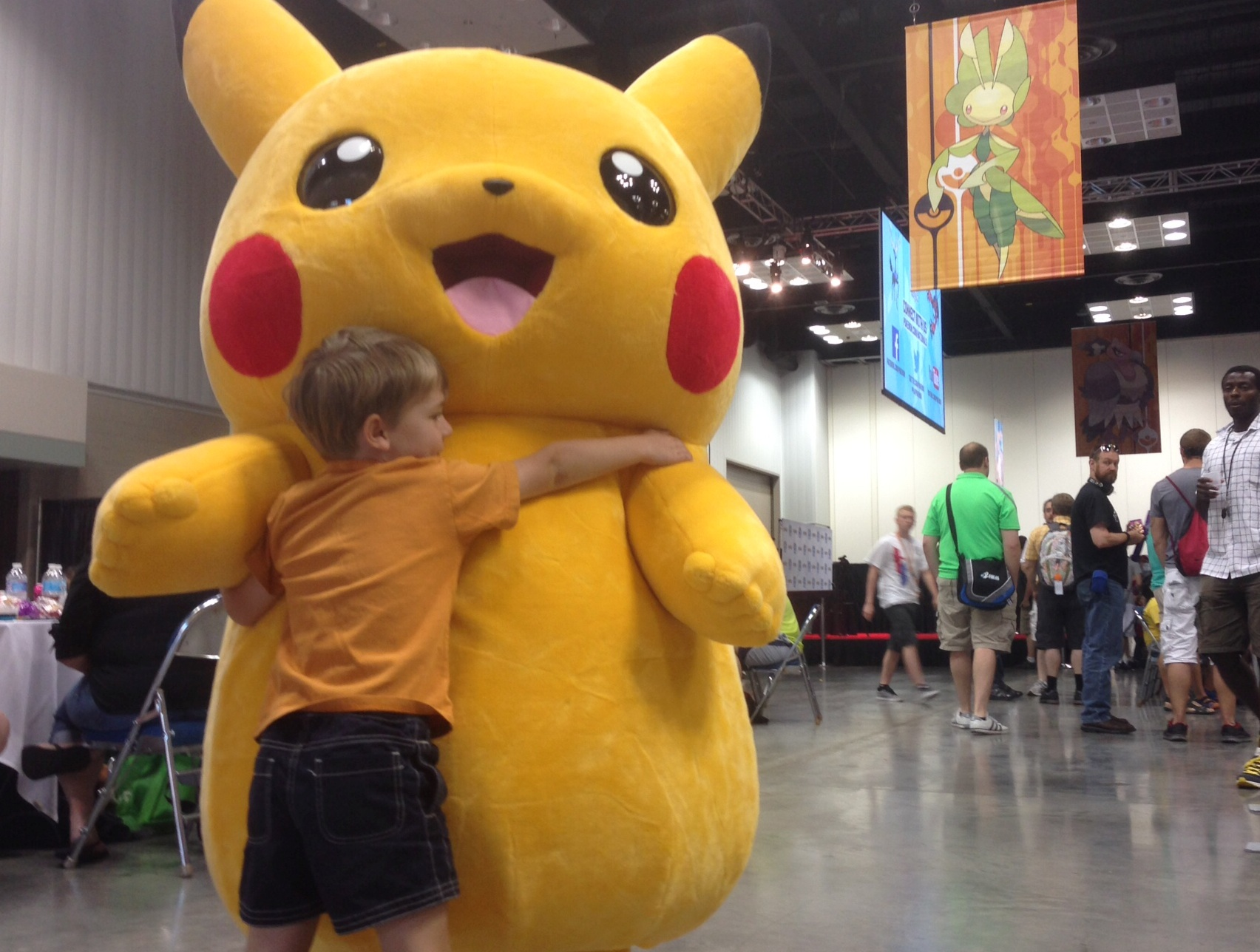
A boy hugging a Pikachu-costumed performer.

A production council was formed to produce the anime. Different people appeared at different meetings, but four individuals usually present were Ishihara of Creatures, Sugimori of Game Freak, Yuyama of OLM, and independent producer Yoshikawa. Yoshikawa had the final say. The council decided on the anime's worldview, characters, general storyline, and various important details. The early meetings, which were also attended by Tajiri, usually started with a Q&A session in which Tajiri and Ishihara were asked about the Pokémon universe. The council was careful to have the anime be in concordance with the video game. Inevitably, there had to be differences between the two, but all agreed that the overall worldview as envisioned by Tajiri should not be disturbed. At the start of the video game, the player has to choose one of three starter Pokémon: Fushigidane, Hitokage, or Zenigame (Bulbasaur, Charmander, or Squirtle). The council did not want to unfairly popularize any of them, and wanted the protagonist to start out with a different Pokémon. They unanimously decided that a Pikachu should be one of Pokémon's central icons. They expected Pikachu to appeal to both boys and girls, as well as their mothers. This would expand the franchise's audience, which was considered a core objective of the anime.

During the council's first meeting, Yoshikawa brought up the issue of whether the Pokémon in the anime could talk, and if not, how they could communicate. In the video games, each has a specific cry. In Anakubo's CoroCoro manga, most could speak. At first, the council believed there should be a mixture of Pokémon that could talk and some that could not. This idea was eventually discarded: the Pokémon had to make a specific cry. The council agreed that Pokémon were like animals, and while they and humans should be able to understand each other in the series, they should not speak each other's language. It was decided that Pikachu would repeatedly say its own name in various intonations. The role of Pikachu was given to Ikue Otani. During try-outs, Yuyama had Otani voice Pikachu in normal Japanese, as well as in 'Pikachu talk', in which it only said the syllables of its name. Yuyama realized that, even in the latter style of limited communication, Otani was experienced enough to still convey the messages and emotions needed.

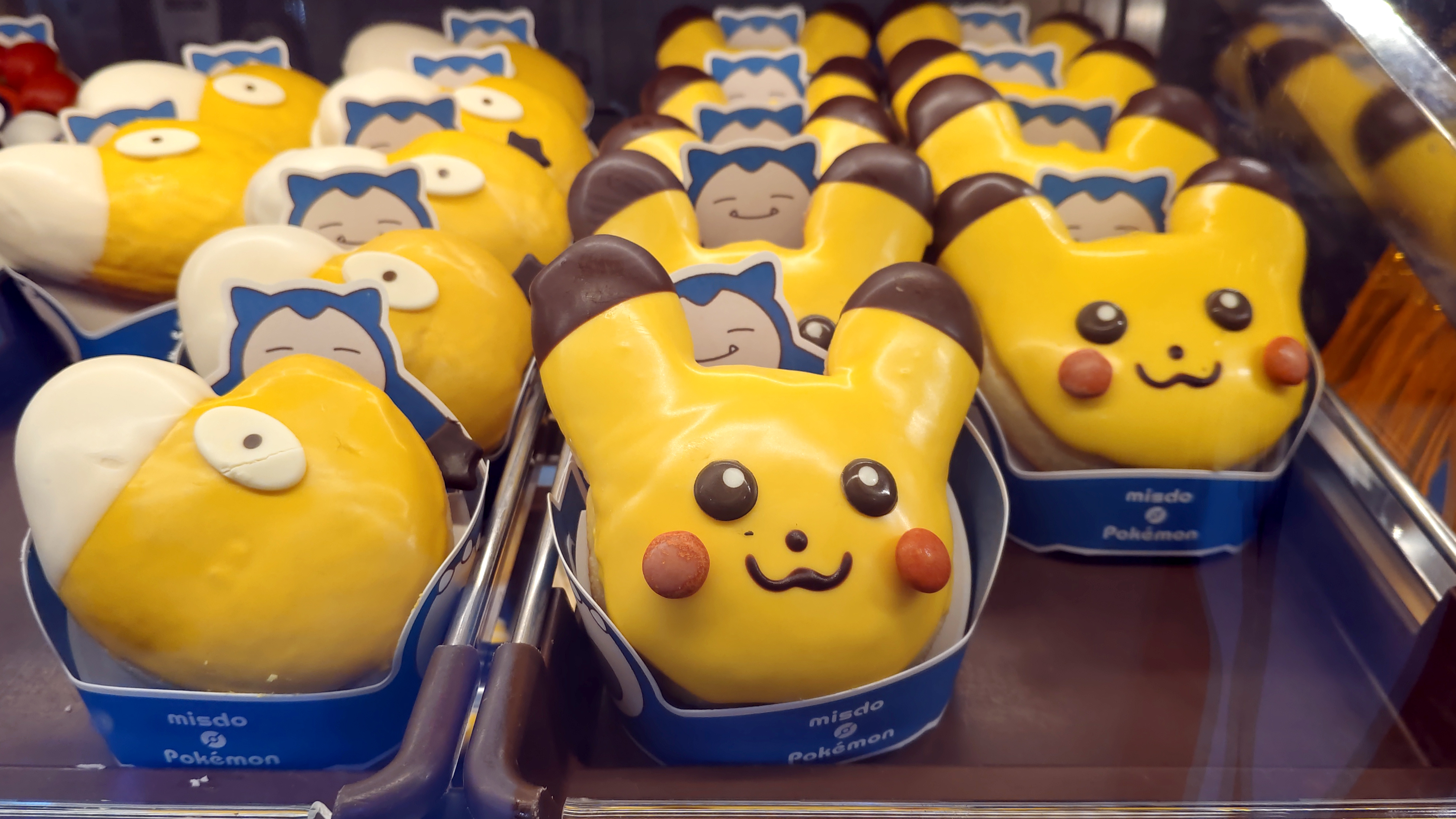
Limited-edition Pokémon-themed donuts from Mister Donut, Kaohsiung

Pocket Monsters premiered on 1 April 1997. By November, it had become the highest-rated program on TV Tokyo.

==== "Dennō Senshi Porygon" incident ====
In the evening of 16 December 1997, the Pokémon franchise was hit by a crisis related to the broadcast of the anime's 38th episode, "Dennō Senshi Porygon" (Computer Warrior Porygon). It was watched by approximately 4.6 million households. In the episode, the cast is transported into a virtual world, accompanied by a Porygon, an artificially-made Pokémon. While flying through cyberspace, they are attacked by an anti-virus program which mistakes them for viruses, shooting "vaccine missiles" at them, resulting in explosions of bright, rapidly swapping red and blue flashes.

The intense stimuli brought about by the episode triggered a variety of adverse health effects in more than 10,000 viewers, primarily irritated eyes, headaches, dizziness, and nausea. A small part suffered a photosensitive epileptic seizure, manifested in loss of consciousness and/or convulsions. Hundreds (Note: A definitive number could not be established. The Fire and Disaster Management Agency announced that, as of 17:00, 17 December, a total of 685 people had been taken to hospitals in direct relationship to the Pokemon episode. Of these, 208 people were actually hospitalized. However, different figures have been stated by different sources. Pokemon Story (2000), a 500+ page book on Pokemon, states that "approximately 750 children" were taken to hospitals, of which 135 were hospitalized. It has been reported that, due to the incident catching the country off-guard, different methods of surveying were used throughout Japan, and these methods were not always accurate.) of children were brought to hospitals, although some had recovered enough upon arrival and did not need to be hospitalized. No one died. Broadcasting of Pokémon was halted, and new guidelines were implemented to help prevent similar events from happening. With the show on hiatus, ShoPro and OLM worked on a feature Pokémon film. By the time the incident occurred, its script was already written and storyboards were being made. In mid-January, the staff resumed creating new episodes. The anime series returned on 16 April 1998. The film, titled Pocket Monsters the Movie: Mewtwo Strikes Back (Pokémon: The First Movie), premiered on 18 July 1998, becoming the fourth highest grossing film of the year in Japan.

Ultimately, the incident did not damage the Pokémon franchise – it in fact grew further during and after the anime's hiatus. While video rental tapes were removed from shelves, all other Pokémon products continued to be sold as usual, and customer demand for them remained high. Helping matters was a general understanding among businesses that the anime was not canceled, but rather suspended, and many executives (correctly) expected the show to be resumed after precautions had been taken. Supermarkets and other distribution outlets responded calmly to the crisis, and did not remove Pokémon products from their sales floors.

=== 1998–2000: International expansion ===
"When we started this project in Japan, one of the first things I was told was that this kind of thing would never appeal to American audiences. They said, 'Because the characters are in a very Japanese style, you cannot sell them to Americans'. So from the very beginning, I never thought there would be an English version. Now, it's just as popular in the United States [as in Japan], and I realized that we shouldn't always believe the opinions of conservative marketers."

— Shigeru Miyamoto, August 1999

Possibly the first official to show interest in a North American launch of Pokémon was Minoru Arakawa, founder and then-president of Nintendo of America (NoA). Arakawa visited Japan to participate in Shoshinkai 1996, held 22–24 November. It was around this time when he first played one of the three Pokémon titles released at the time. He thought the games were promising, but Nintendo in Japan (NCL) had no plans at the time to release them elsewhere. He returned to America with a few cartridges and tested the game on his employees – they did not believe it would work in the US. At the time, role-playing games (RPGs) were not very popular outside Japan, and NoA executives believed that American children did not have the attention span for such a complex title. Americans were said to be more interested in sport- and action-oriented games, preferably with realistic graphics. Japanese people, by contrast, were alleged to care more about characters and plot. Up to that point, few Japanese properties had been successfully mainstreamed in the US, and if they were, it was alleged to be on account of having been properly Americanized: Mighty Morphin Power Rangers was considered a prime example of this. Visually, Pokémon was believed to be too kawaii, or cute. It was assumed that Pokémon could not succeed on cute alone – it must also be cool. In an effort to enhance the franchise's coolness, NoA considered a graphical redesign and contracted a few external artists to create some test-designs for the American market. The mockups they proposed included 'graffiti style' drawings, 'beefed-up' and more muscular-looking Pokémon, and a new Pikachu that looked like "a tiger with huge breasts". Arakawa concluded that it "didn't work", and by that time, the anime had begun its production in Japan, leading NoA to conclude it was too late for a graphical revamp anyway.

Of pivotal importance to Pokémon's global expansion was Alfred R. Kahn, CEO of US-based 4Kids Entertainment, NoA's licensing agent since 1987. Convinced of the franchise's potential, Kahn agreed to invest an undisclosed sum in return for both the anime and licensing rights. Pokémon became one of the first Japanese media franchises in which both the localization of the anime and the licensing of merchandise were handled by a single company, as well as a non-Japanese company. Kahn suggested using the short version of the name, "Pokémon", adding an acute accent (´) over the e to assist with pronunciation and "give it a little flair". NCL president Hiroshi Yamauchi officially approved the project in late November, and subsequently announced it at Space World 1997. However, three weeks later, the "Dennō Senshi Porygon" incident happened, which Kubo felt made even more people resistant to the idea of an overseas introduction.

Market research came back negative: American kids reportedly did not like Pokémon. Arakawa ignored the study and, convinced of the franchise's potential, allocated an enormous budget to Pokémon's launch. The exact amount was not disclosed, but was reportedly equal to or more than $50 million (c. $98.76 million in 2025), approximately the same amount as the launch budget of the Nintendo Entertainment System in 1985. Arakawa admitted that it was "quite a bit of money", but NoA "had been doing well for several years, so we had a lot of money to spare". He opined that if Pokémon were as successful in the US as it had been in Japan, "an investment of 1 would turn into 100". NoA and 4Kids proceeded to plan "an all-out effort to repeat the phenomenon in the Western world".

The localization of the Pokémon anime was done by 4Kids, and directed by Norman J. Grossfeld. Grossfeld strongly believed that the anime should be Americanized. At NATPE 1998, he asked ShoPro for a "kind of carte blanche, to let me change the show as I think would work for this market", to which ShoPro agreed. However, no national TV station was interested in buying the anime or financing its localization. Kahn then decided to self-finance Pokémon's production costs, despite realizing this "could very well bring down 4Kids" if the show failed. Kahn said at the time that they "spend a fortune" on the localization. To have it broadcast in syndication, 4Kids offered the show for free to local TV stations across the country, in exchange for a portion of the advertising revenue. NoA assisted, persuading dozens of stations to carry the series by offering to buy some of their advertisement space, spending a total of $5 million (c. $9.88 million in 2025). Despite all this, most broadcasters were still reluctant to carry Pokémon, with Grossfeld experiencing difficulties getting through their "preconceived notions or their snobbery for Western-produced animation over something from Asia". At the time, anime had not yet found mainstream popularity in the West. Contemporary news reports cited Sailor Moon (Note: Attributed to multiple references:) as an example of an anime that had failed to catch on with American youth. (Note: However, Sailor Moon did gain a cult following at the time. After being pulled from syndication in spring 1996 due to low ratings, it was broadcast again on USA Network from June 1997 to March 1998. The anime subsequently had a successful run on Cartoon Network's Toonami block from 1 June 1998, to 5 July 2002, a timeframe that overlapped Pokémania.) Still, with NoA's help, 4Kids ultimately succeeded in contracting 112 broadcasters for Pokémon, reaching "about 85 to 90 percent" of television households. However, many broadcasters gave it off-peak time slots, with starting times like 06:00 or 06:30. Prior to the late 1990s, this was the case for many anime in the US.

Grossfeld came up with the advertising slogan "Gotta catch 'em all!" as the English equivalent to the Japanese Pokemon GETTO daze~! (ポケモンゲットだぜー！, Get (the) Pokémon!). The phrase "miraculously managed to gain approval" by the Federal Communications Commission (FCC), which normally prohibits the use of injunctions in ads directed at children (e.g. "You must buy this!"). While the tagline may sound commanding, the FCC reasoned that the act of catching is at the core of Pokémon's play. Therefore, the phrase was allowed. The series' theme song was written by John Loeffler and John Siegler, and performed by Jason Paige.

The Pokémon anime was first broadcast on 7 September 1998. Pokémon Red Version and Blue Version were released three weeks later, on 28 September 1998. To localize the card game, Nintendo contracted Wizards of the Coast, the creator of Magic: The Gathering. The Pokémon Trading Card Game was officially launched nationwide on 9 January 1999, although pre-sold in select stores in December. Coinciding with the North American launch of Pokémon was the release of the Game Boy Color on 23 November 1998.

==== 1999–2000: Pokémania ====
In North America, the debuting Pokémon franchise quickly rose to success. By December 1998, the Pokémon anime had become the highest-rated syndicated children's show during the weekdays. This attracted the attention of two media companies: Warner Bros., co-owner of The WB channel; and Saban Entertainment/Fox Family Worldwide, owners of the Fox Kids channel. A bidding war ensued between the parties, which was won by Warner Bros. On 13 February 1999, Pokémon launched on the Kids' WB national television block. The debut episode became the most watched premiere in Kids' WB's history.

By April 1999, there was a general consensus in the US that Pokémon had become a phenomenon and the newest children's fad. (Note: Attributed to multiple references:) By some, the fad was referred to as "Pokémania", (Note: Attributed to multiple references:) including journalists of Time and USA Today. In the US, severe scarcity of Pokémon goods occurred, especially Pokémon cards, causing companies to miss profits. A Milwaukee Journal Sentinel article, published on 3 August 1999, cited a Toys "R" Us manager as saying that a supply of 600 booster packs would last 24 hours. The CEO of one card distributor stated that they were "thousands of boxes behind" on orders. In the same article, a Wizards spokeswoman stated that more employees and printers had been hired to increase card production. However, near the end of the month, a different Wizards spokeswoman told The Washington Post that they had "exhausted most of the card-printing capacity of the United States". Similarly, USA Today reported in November 1999 that factories making Hasbro's Pokémon toys had expanded production by 20 times, but demand still exceeded supply.

In part due to the Pokémon craze, Nintendo saw a 250% increase in profits in 1999 compared to the previous year, reaching a six-year high. The Pokémon franchise accounted for over 30% of Nintendo's revenue that year. Pokémon's popularity also caused a sharp increase in sales of the Game Boy line. The financial windfalls came at a time when Nintendo lost dominance in the home console market, with the Nintendo 64 being outsold by Sony's PlayStation. The global success of Pokémon compensated for this loss somewhat. (Note: Attributed to multiple references:) Scholars David Buckingham and Julian Sefton-Green went even further, writing in 2004: "while Nintendo is now among Japan's most profitable corporations, it could be argued that the company would have struggled to survive without Pokémon".

4Kids, initially a little-known firm, expanded thirty times in revenues, and was named the fastest-growing company in America in the 4 September 2000 issue of Fortune magazine. Many businesses that obtained a Pokémon license early reaped considerable profits. In the summer of 1999, a massive run on stocks of publicly traded Pokémon licensees caused their value to increase dramatically. However, by November, most investors were shorting their shares. Realizing that Pokémon was a fad that would peak and fall at some point, investors were bearish about its prospects.

Pokémon: The First Movie premiered in North America on 12 November 1999, and in Europe the following year. Despite being negatively received by many Western critics, it became one of the most successful Japanese animated films of all time. In the United States, November 1999 was estimated to have been the peak of Pokémania. (Note: Attributed to multiple references:) Supporting the American release of The First Movie was a promotional action with Burger King, one of the largest in the history of the fast-food industry. The success of the promotion resulted in supply issues; restaurants often ran out of Pokémon toys to include with their meals. On 27 December, Burger King recalled its Poké Ball toy after a 13-month-old girl died suffocating on one.

Pokémon Gold and Silver, the successors to Red/Green/Blue, were released in Japan on 21 November 1999, North America on 15 October 2000, and Europe on 6 April 2001.

==== The Pokémon Company and Pokémon USA established ====
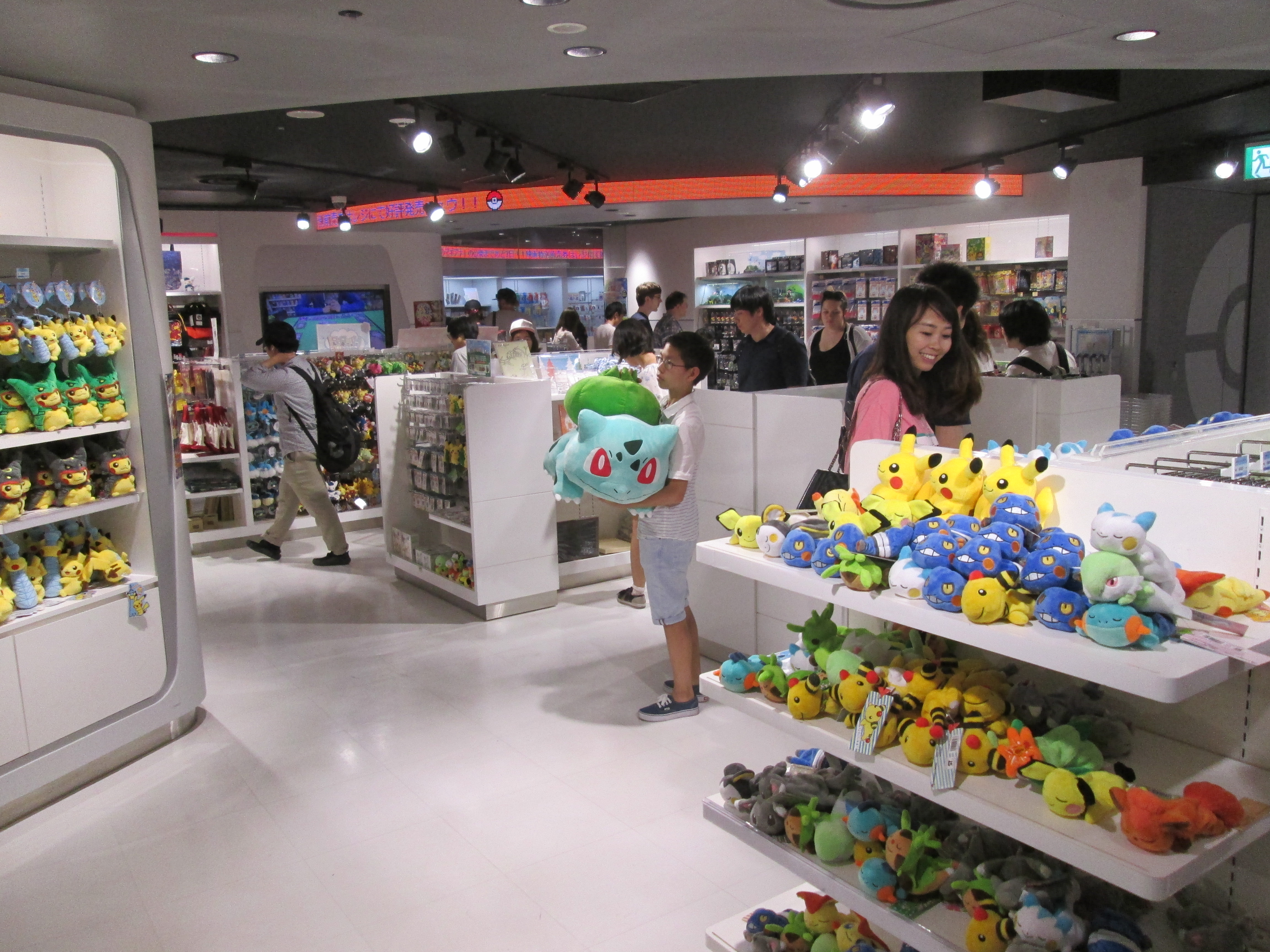
Pokémon Center Mega Tokyo, a large Pokémon merchandise shop in Sunshine City, Ikebukuro.

On 23 April 1998, Pokémon Center Co. Ltd. was founded as a joint venture by Nintendo, Creatures, and Game Freak. It was initially formed for the management of specialized merchandise stores called Pokémon Centers, of which the first location opened in Nihonbashi, Tokyo, on 18 July 1998. Throughout the years, multiple Japanese Pokémon Centers, as well as smaller Pokémon Stores, have opened and closed. As of October 2026, there are a total of 23 Pokémon merchandise shops in Japan. (Note: Aside from the 23 Japanese Pokémon Centers and Stores, there are also two Pokémon Cafes in Japan: one in Tokyo, and one in Osaka. Furthermore, there is a "Pikachu Sweets by Pokémon Cafe" store in Tokyo, which sells confections and takeout desserts. These establishments also sell Pokémon merchandise.) An American Pokémon Center also existed in New York City from 2001 to 2005. It was then remodelled into Nintendo World, later renamed Nintendo New York.

After the release of Gold and Silver, Tsunekazu Ishihara began setting out a number of long-term goals for the Pokémon franchise, which included releasing a movie every year. (Note: Shogakukan kept this condition until 2021. As of 2026, the last animated Pokémon feature is Pokemon: Coco (ポケモン ココ), released in Japan on 25 December 2020. It was released worldwide (excluding Japan, Korea, and China) as Pokémon the Movie: Secrets of the Jungle on 8 October 2021. Between 1998 and 2021, a total of 23 anime films were released.) As part of Ishihara's plan, the Pokémon Center Co. Ltd. was reformatted into The Pokémon Company (TPC), and officially renamed in October 2000. The goal of TPC is to centralize and streamline the global management of Pokémon. In February 2001, Pokémon USA was established, an affiliated firm of The Pokémon Company.

=== 2001–2006: End of the craze ===
In North America, Pokémania peaked in 1999, slowing down throughout the next year. On 29 April 2000, the anime was bumped off Kids' WB's No. 1 spot after holding it for 54 weeks. Around the same time, Pokémon was surpassed at Fox Kids by its rival Digimon. In Europe, the craze peaked in 2000. On 20 January 2001, The New York Times reported that Pokémon's trading card market had collapsed in the US. A June 2001 survey in the United Kingdom confirmed that Pokémon's popularity was waning there. Joseph Tobin wrote: "By the summer of 2001, Pokémon's shelf space in Japanese and U.S. toy stores was but a fraction of what it enjoyed in the fall of 1999". By the end of 2001, Pokémania was fading globally, and by 2002, the fad was largely over.

From 2000 to 2002, Game Freak developed Pokémon Ruby and Sapphire, the successors to Gold and Silver, for the newly released Game Boy Advance. Masuda, who was appointed to assistant director during Gold and Silver, was promoted to director for Ruby and Sapphire, with Tajiri making himself executive director.

In October 2001, 4Kids Entertainment signed a new contract with Pokémon USA (PUSA), continuing to serve as Pokémon's exclusive licensing agent and anime localizer. On 23 December 2005, it was announced that the agreement would not be renewed and would expire on 31 December, with PUSA moving all licensing in-house. The localization of the anime would be done by PUSA in cooperation with TAJ Productions. PUSA proceeded to replace almost all of the original English voice actors, who were still under contract with 4Kids. This decision "raised the ire of fans and the actors themselves". According to Stuart Zagnit, who voiced Professor Oak, the recasting was done to cut back on costs.

In March 2003, Pokémon UK was established in London as a British representative of The Pokémon Company.

=== 2006–2012: Generation IV–V, TPCi established ===
Following Ruby and Sapphire, Pokémon Diamond and Pearl were released for the Nintendo DS on 28 September 2006 in Japan and on 22 April 2007 in North America. A third version, Pokémon Platinum, was released on 28 September 2008 in Japan and on 22 March 2009 in North America. They form the fourth generation (Generation IV) in the Pokémon video game series. Diamond and Pearl were designed based on the DS's various features such as its Wi-Fi capabilities and slot for a Game Boy Advance cartridge. Pokémon president Tsunekazu Ishihara dubbed the games the "ultimate" Pokémon titles because they allowed the player to trade and battle Pokémon (including every Pokémon from previous iterations) globally through WiFi, whereas previously trading was only possible locally, and with fewer Pokémon. The games' characters are 2D and the environments are rendered in 3D, and it is considerably difficult to differentiate them because Game Freak designed them this way to innovate the graphics while also retaining the traditional game style and feel.

In 2009, Pokémon USA and Pokémon UK merged to form The Pokémon Company International (TPCi). This subsidiary of The Pokémon Company (TPC) has since managed the Pokémon franchise outside of Asia.

In Generation V, Pokémon Black and White were released on 18 September 2010 in Japan for the DS and on 6 March 2011 in North America. The games feature enhanced visual effects and increased use of 3D graphics. The developers excluded old Pokémon and strategies, while introducing over 150 new Pokémon to evoke a sense of novelty and to provide new players with a more "leveled playing field" against old players. The games seek to attract both new players and returning players through their detailed walkthrough and the addition of C-Gear (a real-time communication tool to improve the trade and battle experiences), respectively. Black and White were followed by Pokémon Black 2 and White 2, which were released on 23 June 2012 in Japan and on 7 October 2012 in North America.

=== 2013–2018: 3D, Generation VI–VII, Pokémon Go ===
In Generation VI, Pokémon X and Y were released worldwide for the 3DS on 12 October 2013, and they are the first games to be released in this way. The developers focused on the themes of "beauty", "bond", and "evolution", and it is based on these themes that they created the games' core mechanic where Pokémon could achieve a higher form of evolution by strengthening their bonds with trainers; however, to maintain game balance, they limited this feature to a special, temporary phenomenon. The games' shift to fully 3D graphics allowed the player to freely manipulate camera angles, but due to technical limitations objects far away were rendered in lower polygon models. Addressing the move away from 2D graphics, producer Hitoshi Yamagami told fans that "at Game Freak we're big fans of 2D graphics... So there are some elements in there that I [Yamagami] think fans of 2D will appreciate as well." When asked about the Horde battle and Sky battle types, he stated that Horde battles are to supplant the roles of "really strong Pokémon [sic]" to help the player more easily progress through the games and also to add "more excitement to the battles and a sense of danger", and that they added the Sky battles to take advantage of the games' 3D camera angles capabilities.

In Generation VII, Pokémon Sun and Moon were released worldwide for the 3DS on 18 November 2016, and on 23 November 2016, in Europe. The developers chose Hawaii for inspiration due to its distinctive warm sunlight and clear moonlight, as well as its unique biomes, which were conducive to the games' regional Pokémon variance concept. Ohmori said that, as director, he aimed to focus on the concept of "Pokémon as these living creatures, [and really focus] on them being alive." Having the release date on the 20th anniversary of Pokémon in mind, he treated this project as a "celebration of that life, and to really express this respect for life". As he contemplated life and its origins, Ohmori considered the significance of the Sun, enabling life with its light, and the Moon's impact on certain species' reproduction. He explained how the Sun, the Moon, and the Earth "work [together] to influence [one another], and life as a result grows and flourishes based on [this] relationship."

==== 2016: Release of Pokémon Go ====
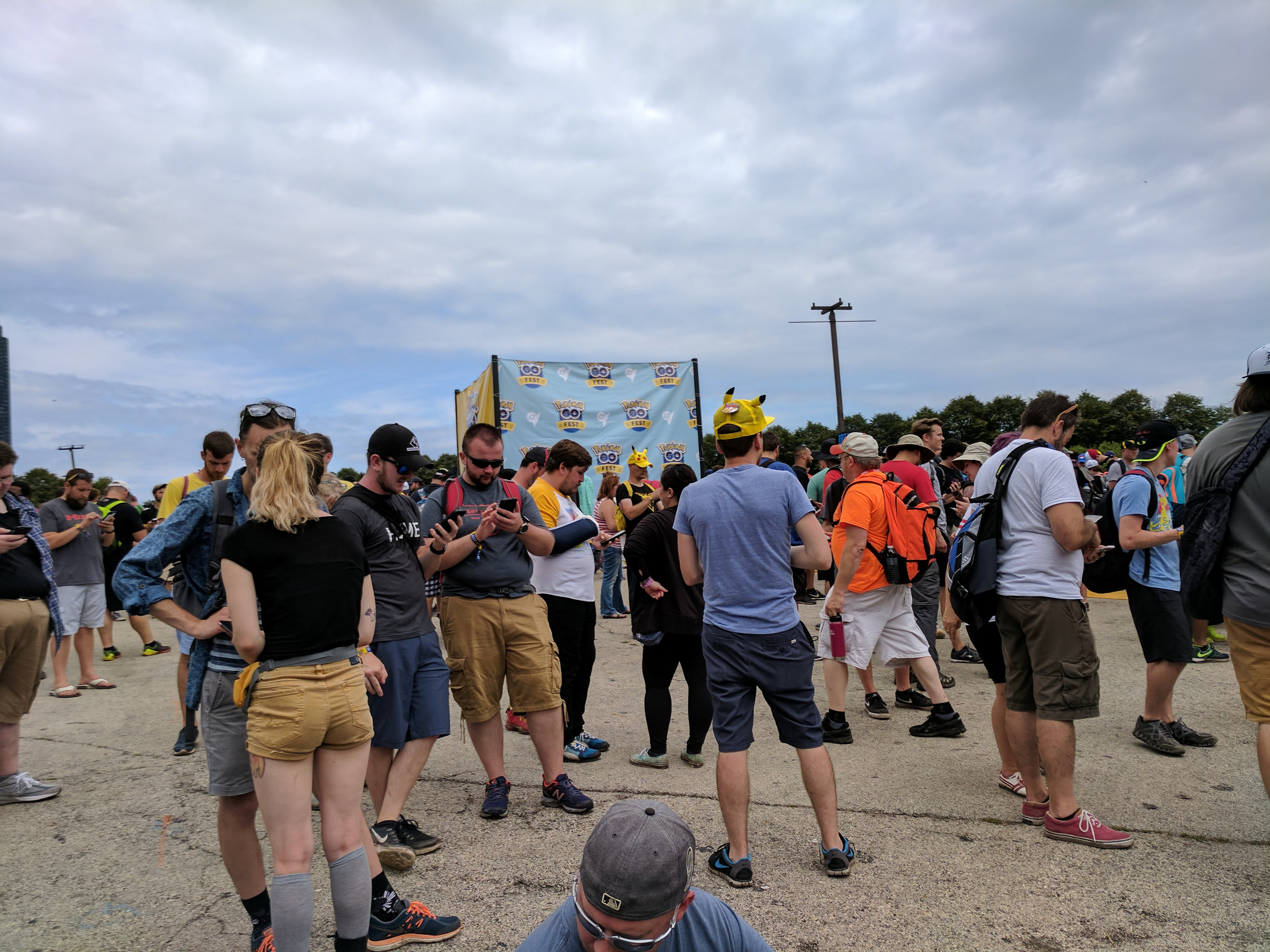
Players during the Pokémon Go Fest in Chicago in 2017

In 2016, the Pokémon franchise spawned a second worldwide fad with the release of Pokémon Go, a mobile augmented reality game. The app originated as a Google April Fools' Day joke in 2014: the "Google Maps Pokémon Challenge". The prank was conceived by Tsunekazu Ishihara and Satoru Iwata. On Ishihara's initiative, the hoax was turned into an actual video game developed by Niantic. Ishihara was a fan of Niantic's previous transreality game, Ingress, and saw the game's concept as a perfect match for Pokémon.

Through in-game purchases, the game generated more than $160 million by the end of July 2016, with App Annie reporting that Pokémon Go had generated around $10 million in revenue every day that month. The same month, Sensor Tower reported that the game had passed more than $200 million in worldwide revenue, beating every existing record set by Clash of Clans and Candy Crush by a wide margin. The average daily usage of the app on Android devices in July 2016 exceeded that of Snapchat, Tinder, Twitter, Instagram, and Facebook. By 2 September 2016, Pokémon Go had generated more than $440 million in worldwide revenue, according to Sensor Tower. By 30 September, it had received 500 million downloads and grossed $470 million in 80 days, according to market research firm Newzoo. Pokémon Go reached the milestone of $600 million in revenue after only 90 days on the market, becoming the fastest mobile game ever to do so.

=== 2019–present: Generation VIII–X, open-world gameplay ===
Generation VIII debuted with the release of Pokémon Sword and Shield on 15 November 2019, for the Switch. Director Shigeru Ohmori stated that they designed the games based on what they believed of the biggest Pokémon theme of becoming/being "the greatest or strongest", which was expressed in the games' Dynamax / Gigantamax Pokémon core mechanic and the games' increasingly powerful software and hardware capabilities. Ohmori further revealed that through developing the Let's Go games as research projects for the Switch, they were able to gain valuable experiences and knowledge to develop Sword and Shield. He noted that they took advantage of the Switch's high resolution and TV connectivity to implement the games' gigantic-size core Pokémon mechanic. They envisioned the games' setting to be a "wide-open space" that is different from the traditional route systems and is constantly changing where the player can meet and explore with other players.

In 2020, the COVID-19 pandemic broke out. The resulting widespread ennui and excessive leisure time inspired a resurgence in popularity and interest in Pokémon cards, which was further popularized by various YouTubers and other influencers, such as Logan Paul. The craze resulted in severe supply shortages, and customers' inappropriate and obsessive behavior raised safety concerns in many retail outlets. Pokémon cards' values skyrocketed, prompting collectors to submit cards and overwhelm card grading agencies. The Pokémon Company responded by reprinting impacted products at maximum capacity to ensure price stabilization and general accessibility.

Pokémon Legends: Arceus was released on 28 January 2022, for the Switch as a prequel to Diamond and Pearl. It is part of Generation VIII. According to the Pokémon Company, the game represented "a new approach for the Pokémon video game series", creating more of an "action-RPG experience" by implementing some real-time elements. Unlike traditional Pokémon games, the player can catch Pokémon by throwing a Poké Ball in real-time rather than triggering a battle; however, they can still choose the latter to weaken it for capture. Many in-game aspects, particularly its landscape, heavily resemble those of The Legend of Zelda: Breath of the Wild.

Generation IX was introduced with the release of Pokémon Scarlet and Violet for the Switch on 18 November 2022. The games were the first in the Pokémon franchise to feature an entirely open-world experience, as opposed to the partially open-world experience in previous Pokémon games such as Sword and Shield, allowing players to face gyms in any order, and to follow quest lines encountered around the world. The games' improved multiplayer experience allowed for up to four players to travel together. Their DLC, The Hidden Treasure of Area Zero, consists of two parts, The Teal Mask and The Indigo Disk; The Teal Mask was released on 12–13 September 2023 and The Indigo Disk was released on 14 December 2023. An epilogue to The Hidden Treasure of Area Zero was released on 11 January 2024.

Pokémon Legends: Z-A was released on 16 October 2025 for the Nintendo Switch and Nintendo Switch 2. It is part of Generation IX. The game is a successor to Legends: Arceus, and takes place in the Kalos region, seen in Generation VI games X and Y. A DLC, Mega Dimension, released on 10 December 2025.

In January 2026, Lego announced their first ever Pokémon sets available for preorder to be released on 27 February 2026. According to Yahoo News, the most expensive sets, costing $650, sold out quickly, and some were being resold for higher prices on eBay before their official release.

On 27 February 2026, the franchise's 30th anniversary, Pokémon Winds and Waves were announced in a Pokémon Presents live stream as the first Generation X games. The games are set to release in 2027.

== Media ==
=== Video games ===
Pokémon video games encompass a wide variety of genres. The role-playing games (RPGs) developed by Game Freak are considered the core series of the franchise. Various spin-off games also exist, including Pokémon Mystery Dungeon, a roguelike RPG series; Pokémon Ranger; an action RPG series, and Detective Pikachu (2018), an adventure game. The games, specifically the core series, are classified in generations. For example, Junichi Masuda referred to Diamond and Pearl (2006) as the fourth generation and X and Y (2013) as the sixth generation.

Until 2011, most Pokémon games were released exclusively on Nintendo consoles. With the rise of the smartphone market during the 2010s, The Pokémon Company also began developing, publishing, and licensing Pokémon titles for mobile devices, most notably Niantic's 2016 AR game, Pokémon Go.

According to The Pokémon Company, over 489 million Pokémon game units have been sold worldwide as of March 2025.

=== Trading card game ===
Palkia, a card from the Diamond and Pearl Base Set

The Pokémon Trading Card Game (PTCG) was one of the first collectible card games (CCGs) in Japan. It was inspired by Magic: The Gathering. In the card game, the players use a 60-card deck featuring Basic and evolved Pokémon, Energy cards, and Trainer cards to help them knock out the opponent's Pokémon, drawing prize cards and winning the game. Cards are classified into various levels of rarity, ranging from Common to Rare Holofoil with a holographic illustration. Rare cards, including limited edition, exclusive cards, and older cards, are highly valued among collectors due to their scarcity.

According to The Pokémon Company, over 75 billion cards have been printed as of March 2025.

=== Anime ===
As of 2026, the Pokémon anime consists of over 1,300 episodes across 29 seasons. Its current season, Pokémon Horizons – Wonders Ahead, started airing on 22 May 2026. The anime originally focused on Ash Ketchum and his travels across the Pokémon world with his partner, Pikachu. They were retired as protagonists at the end of season 25. The 26th season, Pokémon Horizons, introduced two new protagonists, Liko and Roy. A total of 23 anime films have been released, the most recent being Pokémon the Movie: Secrets of the Jungle (2020).

Spin-off series from the anime have also been produced, including a variety show titled Weekly Pokémon Broadcasting Station (週刊ポケモン放送局, Shūkan Pokemon Hōsōkyoku), which aired on TV Tokyo from 2002 to 2004 and aired in English as part of Pokémon Chronicles. Several television specials have been released. 27 short films starring Pikachu were produced, primarily preceding the films. Various animated mini-series also exist.

=== Live-action ===
Detective Pikachu, a live-action/animated film based on the video game of the same name, was released in 2019. A sequel was announced even before the original premiered, but as of 2026, its status is unknown.

A live-action television drama, Poketto ni Bōken o Tsumekonde ("A Pocketful of Adventures"), premiered on TV Tokyo on 20 October 2023.

== Reactions to Pokémania ==
1 November 1999 cover of The New Yorker, which depicts a Pikachu carrying away a bag overflowing with money while trick-or-treating. Artwork by Harry Bliss.

In 1999 and 2000, Pokémon was an unprecedented, ubiquitous fad in the Western world. Time magazine described it as "a multimedia and interactive barrage like no other before it". The franchise, primarily aimed at children, elicited mixed responses from parents and teachers, some of them critical. In a 2004 essay, anthropologist Christine R. Yano even said that the reactions at one point constituted a moral panic.

The bulk of the criticism of Pokémon was directed at the trading cards, in particular the booster packs, sealed packages of 11 (Note: From the original Base Set to the Neo Destiny sets, the booster packs contained 11 cards. After that and throughout the third generation 'EX' sets, the booster packs contained 9 cards. From the fourth generation Diamond and Pearl sets onwards, the packs contained 10 cards. Since the seventh generation Sun and Moon sets, the packs have again contained 11 cards.) randomly inserted cards that were sold separately from the main sets. The cards are of varying scarcity, the most valuable being the "holofoil cards" (also called "holographic" or "foil cards"), in which the illustrations of the Pokémon have a shiny overlay effect. The rare cards can only be found in booster packs, and the rarest ones are very infrequently included. Joseph Tobin noted that rarity in this case is "artificially created", and "effectively a form of gambling" in which children need to repeatedly purchase booster packs to get more rare cards. Gilles Brougère described a cynicism among adults that corporations could apparently, "out of thin air", ascribe value to cards which they saw as valueless, thereby "deceiving vulnerable young consumers and garnering excessive profits".

As the franchise's popularity grew, children began taking their Pokémon cards to school for trading and playing. Soon, the cards were alleged to be "disrupting learning, poisoning playground friendships and causing such distraction that some children forget their homework, tune out in class and even miss school buses as they scramble to acquire one more card". The cards were "turning the playground into a black market", with card swaps sometimes inciting conflicts. Certain children engaged in "aggressive trading", tricking other (often younger) kids into unfair deals, forcing teachers to arbitrate. (Note: Attributed to multiple references:) Some parents expressed their concerns about the craze, but feared that their children would be ostracized if they were to deny them Pokémon products. In the US, the Pokémon cards ended up "almost universally banned" from school grounds. Similar bans occurred in Canada, Australia, New Zealand, and European countries. In September 1999, US-based law firm Milberg filed a class-action lawsuit, claiming that the booster packs constitute a form of lottery and promote gambling in kids. The suit is believed to have been settled. (Note: In her 2006 book Millennial Monsters, Anne Allison mentions the card suit and writes, within parentheses, that it "was eventually settled out of court". However, she does not cite a source for this. The full sentence does contain an inline citation to a New York Times piece, but this article does not state that the case was settled.)

The Pokémon anime series was criticized by some as "cheap Japanese animation" that is "violent" and has "little educational value". Michelle Orecklin of Time dismissed the TV series as "less a cartoon than a half-hour exercise in Pokémon product placement". Anne Allison wrote that even those within Pokémon's US marketing team agreed that the anime's visuals were "not especially sophisticated" compared to Disney cartoons. Pokémon: The First Movie premiered in the United States on 12 November 1999, and in European countries in February 2000. While a huge box-office success, the film was received negatively by several Western film critics. The Guardian decried it as a "contemptuously cheap animated cash-in on the monster kids' craze". The American adult animated series South Park satirized Pokémon in the episode "Chinpokomon", aired on 3 November 1999. In the episode, the titular media franchise is portrayed as a low-quality line of products that is part of an evil plan by the Japanese government to invade the US. South Park co-creator Matt Stone commented that, at the time, Pokémon was "scary huge".

Author Chris Kohler wrote that Pokémon was considered "ruthlessly commercial", and that it "program[med] children to be consumers of anything and everything Pokémon". CNN quoted child psychiatrist John Lochridge as worrying that "Pokémon's creators and marketers deliberately set out to create a fantasy world so compelling that children would quickly become obsessed". He believed that kids were being "brainwashed", and said: "I have had parents tell me that they cannot get their kids to do anything except Pokémon, so this stuff seems to really capture their minds, in a way". These concerns were countered by psychologist William Damon, who told Newsweek that obsessing is in fact a normal part of a child's neurological development. It should concern parents only when the obsession gets dangerous or excessive. An op-ed in the New Zealander newspaper The Dominion Post claimed that the anti-Pokémon sentiment was particularly American: "The backlash, which seems largely confined to the United States, may be no more than the sound of the world's leading cultural imperialist gagging on a taste of its own medicine".

As Pokémania built, Western media started reporting on several crimes associated with Pokémon. These included violence (including two reported stabbings), burglaries, robberies (some at knifepoint), and shoplifting. Almost all these incidents were connected to the Pokémon cards, and the individuals involved were almost always underage. In the US, the incidents peaked in November 1999. In England, Pokémon-related delinquency reached a head in April 2000. High prices on the grey market were a motive behind some of the crimes, "posing a great temptation for older kids and bullies to take advantage of weaker children". At specialty shops and online auctions, a rare Pokémon card could be bought and sold for $50 or more (c. $97 in 2025).

Aside from the negative reactions, many media also cited alleged beneficial effects of Pokémon. It was noted that the video games and the cards require children to read, memorize, calculate, and plan out a strategy. Both encourage socialization, and trading Pokémon requires negotiating skills. Stephanie Strom wrote in The New York Times that the Pokémon anime taught children "traditional Japanese values – responsibility, empathy, cooperation, obedience, respect for elders, humility". Anne Allison interviewed various American parents during Pokémania. She found that while most of them were "utterly mystified" about Pokémon, few were overly worried about it, instead meeting the craze with "befuddled acceptance". Allison also notes that the Columbine High School massacre occurred during Pokémania (on 20 April 1999), causing violent television, music, and games to be scrutinized. Compared to these media, she notes, Pokémon is in fact rather tame.

Pokémon's rapid rise in popularity resulted in popular conspiracy theories as well as significant governmental and religious scrutiny in Saudi Arabia. In 2001, Sheikh Abdulaziz bin Abdullah, the Grand Mufti of Saudi Arabia, issued a fatwa banning Pokémon in Saudi Arabia on the basis that it promotes gambling and that the cards contain symbols resembling "the star of David, which everyone knows is connected to international Zionism and is Israel's national emblem". He also claimed that other symbols on the cards promoted Freemasonry and Christianity. As a result of this edict, Pokémon products were removed from shops in Saudi Arabia and customs officers prevented them from entering the country. In Qatar, Sheikh Yusuf al-Qaradawi likewise issued an edict banning Pokémon, and a United Arab Emirates religious committee issued a fatwa condemning but not banning it. However, in October 2025, Pokémon cards were openly featured at Saudi Arabia's first official card and collectibles festival in Riyadh, which brought together more than 50 vendors from across the country.

== Legacy and influences ==
After World War II, Japan experienced a period of unprecedented growth and became well-known in the Western world for its consumer products, such as radios (e.g. Panasonic, Toshiba), cars (e.g. Toyota, Mitsubishi), and Sony's Walkman. From 1991 onwards, its economy stagnated, causing the country to lose its status as an economic superpower. However, during the 1990s and 2000s, Japan re-emerged as a source of 'cool' cultural goods, embraced by a growing international audience interested in Japanese culture. (Note: Attributed to multiple references:) Nintendo, Sega, and Sony launched several popular video game consoles and franchises. In terms of children's properties, the success of Mighty Morphin Power Rangers changed perceptions on the viability of such Japanese imports in the West. The Tamagotchi fad (1997–98), centered around a portable digital pet device, was said to have "paved the way for Pokémon".

Anne Allison wrote that, before the 1990s, Japan figured little in the face of the worldwide hegemony of Euro-American cultural industries, in particular that of the US. "Hollywood has been hostile to imports", she wrote, "and foreignness has largely been, and been seen as, an impediment to mass popularization in the United States". The surprise success of Pokémon was "an undeniable breakthrough in the homeland of Disney" that "changed preexisting assumptions about the US marketplace at the same time that it was constantly resisted for deviating from them". Pokémon was a welcomed boon to Japan's faltering economy, and positively influenced the country's soft power. Sociologist Yoshinori Kamo interviewed various American children and found that kids who thought Pokémon was cool were more likely to believe that Japan was a cool nation. Anne Allison gave a similar finding: all the children she interviewed knew where Pokémon originated, and "many said that, as a result of Pokémon and other 'cool' Japanese goods, they had developed an interest in Japan". Some "said that they now wanted to study Japanese and travel there one day". Author Chris Kohler wrote: "Japanese are proud of Pokémon, the most successful export of Japanese popular culture ever". However, sociologist Koichi Iwabuchi questioned to what extent Pokémon really is 'Japanese', and to what extent it is simply a good property with universal appeal. He noted that Japanese nationalist commentators celebrated Pokémon's global success and retrospectively attributed this to its "Japanese cultural power", while ignoring the localization of Pokémon overseas, as well as decades of increasing cooperation and cultural exchange between countries (globalization).

In the 20th century, anime found niche popularity in North America and Europe in series (Astro Boy, Kimba the White Lion, Speed Racer) and films (Akira, Ghost in the Shell). (Note: Attributed to multiple references:) The Pokémon TV series and films marked a breakthrough for anime, contributing to its growing worldwide success at the turn of the 21st century. (Note: Attributed to multiple references:) For some children, Pokémon was their introduction to 'Japanimation', serving as a "gateway" to other anime, manga, and Japanese culture in general. Pokémon: The First Movie became one of the most successful Japanese animated films in history. After Princess Mononoke, Pokémon: The First Movie became the second anime film to open at mainstream cinemas in the West, as opposed to the usual art house venues. Pioneering anime importer John Ledford noted that Pokémon underscored the commercial potential of anime, thus making it interesting from a business perspective.

The success of Pokémon encouraged companies to look for other popular Japanese properties that might be localized for Western markets. The importing of at least three similar franchises was confirmed by business executives to have been (partly) inspired by Pokémon: Yu-Gi-Oh!, Digimon, and Monster Rancher. The import of Cardcaptor Sakura (as Cardcaptors) might also have been prompted by Pokémon.
