= Pokémon Ranger: Guardian Signs =

2010 Pokémon videogame spin-off sequel

- North American version cover art
- Developer: Creatures Inc.
- Publishers: JP: The Pokémon Company; WW: Nintendo
- Director: Yukinori Torii
- Producers: Hiroyuki Jinnai; Hiroaki Tsuru
- Designers: Hiroshi Igarashi; Yasuhiro Ito; Satoko Harigaya; Hiroshi Munekiyo; Yuusuke Yamaguchi; Takahiro Sawai; Yohei Asaoka; Yuko Shoji; Satoru Tsuji; Ryōji Tanaka
- Composers: Kenichi Koyano; Shigerou Yoshida; Keisuke Oku
- Series: Pokémon
- Platform: Nintendo DS
- Release: JP: March 6, 2010; NA: October 4, 2010; EU: November 5, 2010
- Genre: Action role-playing
- Modes: Single-player, multiplayer

Pokémon Ranger: Guardian Signs (ポケモンレンジャー 光の軌跡, Pokemon Renjā Hikari no Kiseki; lit. "Pokémon Ranger: Tracks of Light") is an action role-playing video game developed by Creatures Inc. and published by The Pokémon Company in Japan and by Nintendo worldwide for the Nintendo DS. It is the sequel to Pokémon Ranger and Pokémon Ranger: Shadows of Almia, and the third installment in the Pokémon Ranger series. It was released in Japan on March 6, 2010, in North America on October 4, 2010, and in Europe on November 5, 2010, and was later released on the European Wii U Virtual Console on June 9, 2016. Gameplay revolves around capturing Pokémon with the Capture Styler by drawing circles around them. The game received mixed or average reviews, holding a score of 68 on Metacritic and 69% on GameRankings.

== Gameplay ==
Pokémon Ranger: Guardian Signs is an action role-playing game in which players capture Pokémon using the Capture Styler by drawing circles around them. If a Pokémon breaks through the drawn circles by attacking, the styler loses energy. When its energy reaches zero, the styler breaks and the game resumes from the last save point. If a Pokémon crosses the styler's line without attacking, the line breaks but the styler does not lose energy. Capturing Pokémon and completing missions increases experience points, allowing for styler upgrades such as increased power and energy capacity. Later in the game, the styler can be charged to make captures more effective. One of the new features lets you call out your Pokémon for support and to help in captures. The player can use "Guardian Signs" (referred to in the game as "Ranger Signs" or "Emblems") by drawing certain symbols to summon Legendary Pokémon such as Entei, Raikou, and Suicune for use outside of battle. Other features include four player cooperative play with unique missions. The game also includes Wi-Fi mission downloads, one of which gives you access to Deoxys, which can be moved to other DS Pokémon games.

== Plot ==
The game takes place in the island region of Oblivia. The player and a fellow Ranger, Summer (Ben if the player is female), are flying on Staraptors while pursuing the Pokémon Pinchers, who are chasing Latios (Latias if the player is female). The player distracts the Pinchers, allowing Latios or Latias to escape. Their squad leader, Red Eyes, then intervenes and fires a plasma weapon after being taunted by the player's partner. The player shields their partner from the attack and falls into the sea below, losing and later recovering their styler, while their partner is kidnapped. The player subsequently washes ashore on Dolce Island. The player meets a Pichu carrying a ukulele, known as Ukulele Pichu. After repairing its broken instrument, Ukulele Pichu becomes the player's partner Pokémon. As a newly recruited Pokémon Ranger, the player undertakes various missions and encounters allies, rivals, and numerous Pokémon. The primary antagonists, the Pokémon Pinchers, control Pokémon for their own purposes. Accompanied by new Pokémon partners, the player sets out to stop the Pokémon Pinchers and restore peace to Oblivia.

== Development ==
Pokémon Ranger: Guardian Signs was developed by Creatures Inc. for the Nintendo DS. It was first revealed on January 13, 2010, by Japan's CoroCoro Comic, which had first details about the games. On January 15, Nintendo Japan made an official announcement for the game, and provided screenshots and artwork. It was released in Japan on March 6, 2010; North America on October 4, 2010; and Europe on November 5, 2010.

== Reception ==
Reception

Aggregate score
Aggregator	Score
Metacritic	68/100

Review scores
Publication	Score
GamePro	3/5
GamesRadar+	6/10
GameZone	6.5/10
IGN	7/10
Nintendo Power	7/10

The game received mixed or average reviews according to the review aggregator site Metacritic. GamePro rated the game 3/5 stars, stating "Guardian Signs isn't much of a departure from the last two titles in the series". IGN's Kristine Steimer rated the game 7/10, writing that "the different environments look really sharp" and that "the music depicts the mood of the story very well". GamesRadar+ rated the game 6/10, stating that the "Guardian Signs is a great game for small children, but is too simplistic for the rest of us." GameZone rated the game 6.5/10, and commented "The visuals of Guardian Signs actually surprised me... both the characters and the world of Oblivia contain more details than the main Pokémon games."

It was the top-selling game in Japan for the week of March 1 through March 7, selling 161,000 copies. It stayed at the top the next week, selling 65,000 copies. It continued to stay on the charts, selling 360,000 copies in the game's first month. Worldwide the game went on to sell 1.53 million copies total.
