= Pokémon Ranger: Shadows of Almia =

2008 Pokémon videogame spin-off sequel

- North American box art
- Developer: Creatures Inc.
- Publishers: JP: The Pokémon Company; WW: Nintendo
- Director: Katsuyoshi Irie
- Producers: Hiroyuki Jinnai; Hiroaki Tsuru
- Designers: Hajime Kuroyanagi; Yukinori Torii; Hirofumi Matsuoka; Tomoaki Imakuni; Yasuhiro Ito; Satoko Harigaya; Tomohide Takaiwa
- Writer: Akihito Toda
- Composers: Takuto Kitsuta; Kinta Sato; Shinobu Amayake
- Series: Pokémon
- Platform: Nintendo DS
- Release: JP: March 20, 2008; NA: November 10, 2008; EU: November 21, 2008; AU: November 13, 2008
- Genre: Action role-playing
- Mode: Single-player

Pokémon Ranger: Shadows of Almia (ポケモンレンジャー バトナージ, Pokemon Renjā Batonāji; lit. "Pokémon Ranger: Vatonage") is an action role-playing video game developed by Creatures Inc. and published by The Pokémon Company and Nintendo for the Nintendo DS video game console.

It was announced in the January 2008 issue of CoroCoro and was released in Japan on March 20, 2008. It was announced at E3 2008 that the game would be released in the United States under the title Shadows of Almia on November 10, 2008. It was announced on September 25 that the game would be released in Europe under the title Shadows of Almia on November 21, 2008. It was released on the European Wii U Virtual Console on June 9, 2016, and was released on the North American Wii U Virtual Console on August 4, 2016.

The game features 270 Pokémon, including new Pokémon which were not featured in the original Pokémon Ranger, from Pokémon Diamond and Pearl. The game utilized the Nintendo Wi-Fi Connection to download new missions.

== Gameplay ==
The game takes place in the Almia region. The player begins as a Pokémon ranger-in-training at the Ranger School and quickly graduates to a rookie Ranger and must advance from there. The player may choose their character's gender, but unlike in the original Pokémon Ranger, this choice does not affect their partner Pokémon.

Much of the gameplay is similar to the original game. Players must capture/befriend wild Pokémon to aid them by circling them with their Nintendo DS stylus (known as a Capture Styler in the game).

There is a major change from the original capture method. Instead of having to complete certain number of loops without lifting the stylus, the player must fill up a Pokémon's Friendship Gauge by drawing loops around the Pokémon, but can lift the stylus to avoid attacks. However, the power in Friendship Gauge will decrease over time if the player stops drawing loops for too long. The amount of power in the gauge filled by each loop increases as the player levels up the styler.

Shadows of Almia also introduces Quests, which are mini-missions not essential to the plot that involve the player completing requests from Almia citizens, earning new partner Pokémon and power-ups (such as resistance to attacks or longer capture lines) for their styler as rewards.

Unlike the original, Shadows of Almia allows the player to choose their partner Pokémon. In the previous game, the partner was decided based on the players chosen gender (Minun for male, Plusle for female). Players start with either Pachirisu, Munchlax, or Starly, and the other 14 partners (as well as the two partners that were not chosen at the beginning) are obtainable either through sub-quests or in-game events, and once captured, can be switched to be the player's partner at any time. There are 17 possible partners, one for each of the Pokémon types that existed at the time.

Shadows of Almia also includes 4 different types of stylers: the School, Capture, Fine and Vatonage stylers. The School styler is a simplified version of the capture styler, while the Fine Styler has a charge feature (which can be upgraded) which activates when the styler is held down, increasing the amount of feelings conveyed to the Pokémon and enabling quicker captures. The Vatonage styler is a unique Fine Styler that can capture Team Dim Sun's Pokémon instead of merely releasing them.

== Synopsis ==
=== Setting ===
This game takes place in a new region—Almia (アルミア地方, Arumia-chihō), which is speculated to connect to the Sinnoh and Orre regions, with Almia itself possibly being based on Hokkaido in certain areas. The Fiore region is also mentioned frequently in Almia. Almia has a widely varied landscape, from the hot Haruba Desert to the chilly Hia Valley.

=== Plot ===
At the Ranger School, the player as either Kelly or Kate, working with their peers, Keith and Rhythmi, discover nefarious activities taking place in the school's basement. The player saves the school from Tangrowth, and the three graduate, with the player moving to nearby Chicole Village, whilst Keith and Rhythmi transfer to Fiore. Team Dim Sun assume activity in Almia, using machines called Miniremos and Gigaremos to control Pokémon. The player becomes an Area Ranger, assisting the people of Vientown, receiving a partner Pokémon. The player is tasked with patrolling a cave where Pokémon are observed behaving strangely. The source is tracked to a Gigaremo unit. A forest fire soon breaks out at Vien Forest. After stopping the fire with a Blastoise, the player visits Pueltown.

The player assists in locating the leader of the Area Rangers, Barlow, who was last seen on the volcanic island, Boyleland. After exploring Boyle Volcano, the player boards a ship belonging to Team Dim Sum, where Barlow is being held hostage. Upon freeing Barlow, they confront Mr. Kincaid, who is a teacher at the Ranger Academy, but was secretly a leader of Team Dim Sun. Kincaid deploys a Drapion to deal with the Rangers, but is defeated. Kincaid orders the ship to be scuttled, which the player prevents, and Kincaid flees. Barlow steers the ship onto the yard of the Ranger Academy.

Following these events, the player is promoted to Top Ranger and is given the Fine Styler. Their first mission is to help Top Ranger Sven investigate a Team Dim Sun mining operation in the Chroma Ruins. Team Dim Sun is looking for Dark Crystals to power their Gigaremo and Miniremo units. While exploring deeper into Chroma Ruins, Top Ranger Sven and the player locate a hole where a large Shadow Crystal was once held, and a Diary written by the late Brighton Hall, the previous president of Altru Inc. Upon reading the diary, the mining site is discovered to be the ruins of the site where Doyle Hall, the company's founder, first began searching for new energy sources. The Rangers discover that the effects of these dark crystals can be nullified by shards of three gems known as the Tears of Princes.

The player and Keith retrieve the sources of these shards; the blue gem from Almia Castle, the red gem from Boyle Volcano, and the yellow gem from Hippowdon Temple. Although the player takes both the blue and red gems, Keith is captured by Team Dim Sun, who use him to blackmail the player into surrendering the yellow gem. Meanwhile, Sven raids Team Dim Sun's undersea base, stealing plans for an "Incredible Machine". With the aid of Isaac, a former classmate of the player and Kincaid's protege, the plans for Altru Inc.'s tower are discovered, a massive Gigaremo powered by the Shadow Crystal. With this revelation, it is revealed that Altru Inc. is behind Team Dim Sun's activities.

The Sinis Trio—three Team Dim Sun agents serving Blake Hall, Altru's president—attack the Ranger Union headquarters. They bribe Isaac into saving his sister. After the player and Keith stop them, the leaders of the Ranger Union plan an assault on Altru Tower, codenamed Operation Brighton. Top Rangers Sven and Wendy circle the headquarters, while Keith and the player charge the tower, find the Yellow gem, rescue Isaac, and destroy the barrier. The player confronts Blake on the top of the tower, however full activation proceeds anyway. With the Shadow Crystal's power, Blake summons a Dusknoir, but the player captures it. Pushing the Incredible Machine into the unsafe "Level Dark", Blake summons Darkrai, the Shadow Crystal's protector; driven mad by the Incredible Machine, Darkrai breaks free from Blake's control, consuming him into its Dark Void, subsequently going on a rampage. The player uses the power of the Tears of Princes linked with their Styler to capture Darkrai and save Blake, turning the Shadow Crystal into the Luminous Crystal. Professor Hastings reveals that Blake was born Wyatt Hall, and Brighton offered him to the Shadow Crystal and changed his name, a mistake Brighton came to regret when Blake drove him from Altru. Remorseful for his actions, Blake surrenders and is taken into custody.

Peace returns to Almia, and the characters enjoy a concert originally planned for Altru (played by the Go-Rock Quads from the original Pokémon Ranger), while the player returns home. The game ends showing Darkrai circling the Luminous Crystal.

== Reception ==
Reception

Aggregate scores
Aggregator	Score
GameRankings	71/100
Metacritic	68/100

Review scores
Publication	Score
1Up.com	C+
Eurogamer	6/10
GameSpot	7.5/10
IGN	6.7/10

Shadows of Almia has received mostly mixed reviews, with a score of 68 on Metacritic. GameSpot gave the title a 7.5 out of 10 rating, stating that "Pokémon Ranger: Shadows of Almia improves upon its predecessor just enough to make it a fun, solid addition to the spin-off series." Eurogamer gave Pokémon Ranger: Shadows of Almia a 6 out of 10 rating, stating that "With a long wait until the next proper Pokémon game, many fans may feel that's enough, but they shouldn't expect anything more than a mild distraction." 1UP gave the title a C+ rating, stating that "While it's nowhere near as addictive as the regular color-coded Pokémon games, Almia's still a decent diversion—I just wish the story offered something a little deeper." IGN gave the title a rating of 6.7 out of 10, stating that "Unless you're addicted to scribbling circles like that creepy boy from The Ring, or you're some sort of hippie that only likes playing humane non-battling Pokémon games, you could probably pass on this and be just fine." As of July 9, 2008, the game has sold 576,467 copies in Japan, according to Famitsu. It is also the 13th best-selling game of Japan in 2008. It was the sixth best-selling DS game of December 2008 in the United States.

== See also ==
- Pokémon Ranger
- Pokémon Ranger: Guardian Signs
