= Pokémon Ranger =

2006 Pokémon videogame spin-off

- Cover art of the game, depicting (left to right) Kingdra, Charizard, Salamence, and Flygon
- Developers: HAL Laboratory; Creatures Inc.
- Publishers: JP: The Pokémon Company; WW: Nintendo
- Producers: Hiroyuki Jinnai; Yoichi Yamamoto; Hiroaki Tsuru
- Designers: Hajime Kuroyanagi; Shigefumi Kawase; Hisatoshi Takeuchi; Hiroaki Ito
- Writers: Toshinobu Matsumiya; Akihito Toda
- Composers: Takuto Kitsuta; Kinta Sato
- Series: Pokémon
- Platform: Nintendo DS
- Release: JP: March 23, 2006; NA: October 30, 2006; AU: December 7, 2006; EU: April 13, 2007
- Genre: Action role-playing
- Mode: single-player

Pokémon Ranger (ポケモンレンジャー, Pokemon Renjā) is an action role-playing video game developed by HAL Laboratory and Creatures Inc. and published by The Pokémon Company and Nintendo for the Nintendo DS video game console. The game was released in Japan, North America, and Australia in 2006 before releasing in Europe in 2007.

It was also released on the Wii U Virtual Console February 25, 2016, in Europe; February 26, 2016, in Australia; April 13, 2016, in Japan; and July 21, 2016, in North America. This release is now unavailable due to the Wii U Nintendo eShop's discontinuation on March 27, 2023.

This game is a spin-off of the mainline series set in the Fiore region, featuring a new gameplay format and storyline. The battle system and capturing mechanics are different. Rather than conquering Pokémon Gyms, the Elite Four, and Champion, the player completes missions to advance the plot.

It is compatible with Pokémon Diamond and Pearl, HeartGold and SoulSilver, and Platinum, allowing players to transfer the mythical Pokémon Manaphy's egg to those games.

Upon release, Pokémon Ranger received mixed reviews. It was praised for its lengthy mission-based plot but received various criticisms, such as for its use of player-produced sound as a game mechanic.

== Gameplay ==
In Pokémon Ranger, rather than the traditional turn-based fighting mechanic and use of Pokéballs, the player's character can capture Pokémon by using a Capture Styler, controlled by the stylus of the Nintendo DS. To capture a Pokémon, the player must draw consecutive circles around the wild Pokémon on the Nintendo DS touchscreen. To fight back, opposing Pokémon may attempt to flee or attack the Capture Styler. When a Pokémon is captured, it temporarily joins the player's party. The player can use party Pokémon to interact with obstacles outside of battle, using them to solve puzzles by removing boulders, blowing fire, tackling, and other moves. These are called Field Moves. Party Pokémon can also use short attacks in battle to help the player, called Poké Assists. When a party Pokémon successfully uses a Field Move or is hit by an opposing Pokémon's attack in battle, it will leave the party.

The Control Styler has an energy bar, similar to an HP (health points) counter, that will lose points if hit in battle. Like the mainline games, the player can go to a Pokémon Center-like base to "heal", or recharge, their Control Styler. If the Control Styler loses all its energy, it will be treated as a game over, resulting in the player being sent back to the last save terminal.

Save Terminals can be found across the map and allow players to save the game. A quicksave option is also available if a Save Terminal cannot be found or is too far away.

== Plot ==
The storyline follows the player as they start their journey as a Pokémon Ranger to the player becoming a top-ranked Ranger.

After saving and capturing a wild Pokémon, the player is taken to the ranger's base in Ringtown. There, they must complete a series of missions, such as saving Pokémon and completing favors for others. Once the player proves themselves, they are assigned a patrol mission to travel through the Krokka Tunnel. There, they meet the Go-Rock Squad, the villainous team in the Fiore region.

The player reaches Fall City and reports the Go-Rock Squad to the Ranger Leader of Fall City. They are sent on a mission to gain more information about the Go-Rock Squad, and on their expedition, run into a Go-Rock member whose Pokémon tries to destroy buildings in Fall City.

The player will continue to upgrade their rank, eventually being needed in Summerland. Once they arrive there, the player must assist the Ranger Leader of Summerland in finding his lost Pokémon. While traversing through the Olive Jungle, the player meets the Go-Rock Quads, mysterious musicians that inform the player of the Go-Rock Squad's plans to create a Super Styler. This Super Styler will be able to control all Pokémon, and the Go-Rock Squad wants to use it to destroy the Pokémon Rangers.

After returning the Ranger Leader of Summerland's Pokémon, the player heads back to Fall City. There, they work on clearing the Krokka Tunnel and run into the Go-Rock Quads again. The player must fight a head member of the Go-Rock Squad and capture the Pokémon they use. They succeed, resulting in them moving up yet another rank.

The player must then return to Summerland, where they are encouraged to challenge the Jungle Relic. There, the player must complete four challenges: the Challenge of Wind, Challenge of Destruction, Challenge of Water, and a secret fourth challenge that they are urged not to complete. They then run into the Go-Rock Quads who urge them to calm a frenzied Pokémon. This causes the player to unknowingly complete the fourth challenge, causing an Earthquake. The Jungle Relic turns into a volcano, where a Go-Rock Squad member challenges them with a battle. Once the player wins, the Go-Rock member sends a legendary Pokémon after them.

After capturing the legendary Pokémon, the player returns to the ranger base. There, they pair up with a Pokémon Professor to go to a factory together. Upon arrival, the pair run into the Go-Rock Squad and must rescue multiple Pokémon that they are using for labor.

The player then travels to Wintown, having to calm down a frenzied Pokémon that was causing small earthquakes. They then find the Go-Rock Squad's base and infiltrate it. Multiple heads of the Go-Rock Squad attack the player, but are defeated, prompting the heads to set off a self-destruct button. The player must flee the base, returning to the mountains.

While exploring the mountains, they find the leader of the Go-Rock Squad in the Fiore Temple. There, the leader reveals that the Super Styler is complete and sends three legendary Pokémon to attack the player. The player manages to calm the legendary Pokémon, resulting in celebrations from people all over the region and them being awarded the highest rank. This completes the main story line.

In the postgame, the player can continue to explore and catch multiple new Pokémon, including legendries. The special Manaphy mission is unlocked, and once completed, the player will be awarded with a Manaphy egg that can be transferred to Pokémon Diamond and Pearl, HeartGold and SoulSilver, and Platinum.

There is a final mission that requires the player to stop the Go-Rock Squad after they angered yet another legendary Pokémon. Once this mission is finished, the plot is completed.

=== Setting ===
This game is set in the Fiore region, originating from the Italian word for flower. It has no endemic Pokémon, instead being populated by Pokémon seen in the three generations before this game. Traditional Pokémon Trainers are not found in Fiore, but rather Pokémon Rangers, who do not train Pokémon and keep them outside of Pokéballs.

Fiore is a small island region. There are four major settlements in Fiore, being Ringtown, Fall City, Wintown, and Summerland, representing spring, fall, winter, and summer respectively. Ringtown is a small town surrounded by forest and grasslands. North of it lies Krokka Tunnel, which runs to the east, connecting Ringtown to Fall City. Fall City is a port town on the coast, notably larger than Ringtown.

Wintown is a northern town, roughly the size of Ringtown, that lies on the base of the Sekra Range, the coldest area of the region. The Sekra Range is a 6,500-foot-high (2,000m) mountain range that is notable for having a large waterfall that can "fill the Capture Arena 23 times in one minute". It houses the Go-Rock Squad's base and the Fiore Temple.

Summerland is located on a southern island, occupied by the large Olive Jungle. The Jungle Relic is found deep inside the Olive Jungle.

=== Characters ===
Depending on the player's gender, they play as either Lunick (male) or Solana (female). If the player chooses to play as Lunick, their partner Pokémon will be Minun. If they play as Solana, their partner Pokémon will be Plusle. The names of the protagonist can be changed by the player. Whichever one the player does not play as will be an NPC that works alongside them.

Each town has a team of rangers and a Ranger Leader. The Ranger Leaders are Spenser (Ringtown), Joel (Fall City), Elita (Wintown), and Cameron (Summerland). They often work with Professor Hastings, the Chief of Technology for the Ranger Union.

The Go-Rock Squad has multiple nameless grunts and commanders. The heads of the Squad, also known as the Go-Rock Quads, are Tiffany, Clyde, Garret, and Billy. They are revealed to be the children of Gordor, the leader of the Go-Rock Squad.

Multiple legendary Pokémon are relevant to the plot, such as Entei, Raikou, Suicune, Kyogre, Groudon, and Rayquaza.

== Development ==
Information regarding Pokémon Ranger was first published in the July 2005 issue of CoroCoro Comic magazine. Little details were shared, but it was hinted that it would be a game and a movie. An announcement on Pokémon Ranger came as a short teaser at the end of the 8th Pokémon film, Pokémon: Lucario and the Mystery of Mew.

Promotion

A few episodes of the Pokémon animated series have included Pokémon Rangers. They go on special missions to help preserve Pokémon and human relations, wild Pokémon's wellbeing, and the environment. Solana, the female protagonist, has appeared in three episodes of the Pokémon animated series, in one of which she must stop a disturbed legendary Pokémon, Deoxys.

Several Pokémon Rangers can also be battled in the mainline Pokémon games. Being from different regions, these rangers keep their Pokémon in Pokéballs and train them. They are also depicted as preserving wild Pokémon and the environment.

A direct-to-DVD animated film adaptation, Pokémon Ranger and the Temple of the Sea, premiered on Cartoon Network on March 23, 2007, and released on DVD the succeeding month. The movie stars a new Pokémon Ranger named Jack Walker, or Jackie, whose job is to protect a Manaphy egg. Ash and his companions work with Jackie throughout the movie.

Merchandise

There have been multiple merchandise releases for Pokémon Ranger. This includes a toy Capture Styler, a watch inspired by the Capture Styler, handbooks, pins, and other miscellaneous items.

== Reception ==
Reception

Aggregate scores
Aggregator	Score
GameRankings	70/100
Metacritic	69/100

Review scores
Publication	Score
Eurogamer	5/10
GameSpot	7.5/10
IGN	7.1/10

Pokémon Ranger sold 193,337 copies in Japan on its release week. In terms of game reviews, Pokémon Ranger received fairly positive reaction, with a 70% ratio from GameRankings. IGN gave the game an overall score of 7.1/10, noting the presentation, gameplay, and graphics as the game's strong points, but also saying that the game's use of sound is a major drawback, with issues such as using the 8-bit sounds from the previous Game Boy Pokémon games for Pokémon cries. A lack of a multi-player mode was also a negative point in IGN's review.

GameSpot gave a similar review to IGN, giving the game a 7.5/10. GameSpot commented that the game's "unique capturing system," "good-sized quest," and "attractive 2D graphics and animation" were the game's strong points, while also commenting that issues such as the possible scratching of the Nintendo DS touch screen during battle and "basic exploration sequences" were the game's notable weak points. While discussing the mixed quality of Pokémon spin-offs, Retronauts podcaster Jeremy Parish used Pokémon Ranger as an example, referring to it as "crappy." He critiques the dialogue and story, commenting that while Pokémon is a "kiddy game," the writing in Pokémon Ranger is worse than in the mainline games. Fellow Retronauts contributor Justin Haywald criticized HAL Laboratory, which he says is normally a good developer, for making Pokémon Ranger.

As of January, 2025, Pokémon Ranger has sold over 2,930,000 copies worldwide.

== Sequels ==
=== Pokémon Ranger: Shadows of Almia ===
Pokémon Ranger: Shadows of Almia is the sequel to Pokémon Ranger, developed by Creatures Inc. for the Nintendo DS. It was announced in the January 2008 issue of CoroCoro Comic and released in Japan on March 20, 2008. It was announced at E3 2008 that the game would be released in the United States under the title Shadows of Almia on November 10, 2008, and later announced to release in Europe on November 21, 2008. This sequel follows the same mission-based plot, this time, allowing players to download new missions via Nintendo Wifi Connection. This game features 270 new Pokémon that were not seen in Pokémon Ranger.

=== Pokémon Ranger: Guardian Signs ===
Pokémon Ranger: Guardian Signs is an action role-playing video game developed by Creatures Inc., published by The Pokémon Company, and distributed by Nintendo for the Nintendo DS. It is the third and final installment of the Pokémon Ranger series and was released worldwide in 2010. The protagonist explores a new region, Oblivia, as they continue the mission-based plot from the previous games.
