= The Voice – Norges beste stemme season 10 =

2025 season of Norwegian television series

The Voice – Norges beste stemme
- Season 10
- Hosted by: Siri Avlesen-Østli
- Coaches: Yosef Wolde-Mariam; Gabrielle Leithaug; Eva Weel Skram; Espen Lind
- No. of contestants: 48
- Winner: Andrea Holm
- Winning coach: Yosef Wolde-Mariam
- Runner-up: Olivia Husabø

Release
- Original release: 3 January – 23 May 2025

Season chronology
- Next → Season 11

The tenth season of The Voice – Norges beste stemme (The Voice – Norway's Best Voice) is a talent show which premiered on 3 January 2025. Yosef Wolde-Mariam and Espen Lind returned as coaches from the previous season. Debutants Gabrielle Leithaug and Eva Weel Skram joined the panel as coaches this season, marking the first occurrence of two female coaches on a season in the show's history. Additionally, Siri Avlesen-Østli returned for her fourth season as host.

Andrea Holm won the season on 23 May, marking Yosef Wolde-Mariam's first win in nine seasons as a coach.

== Coaches ==
Coaches of The Voice – Norges beste stemme season 10

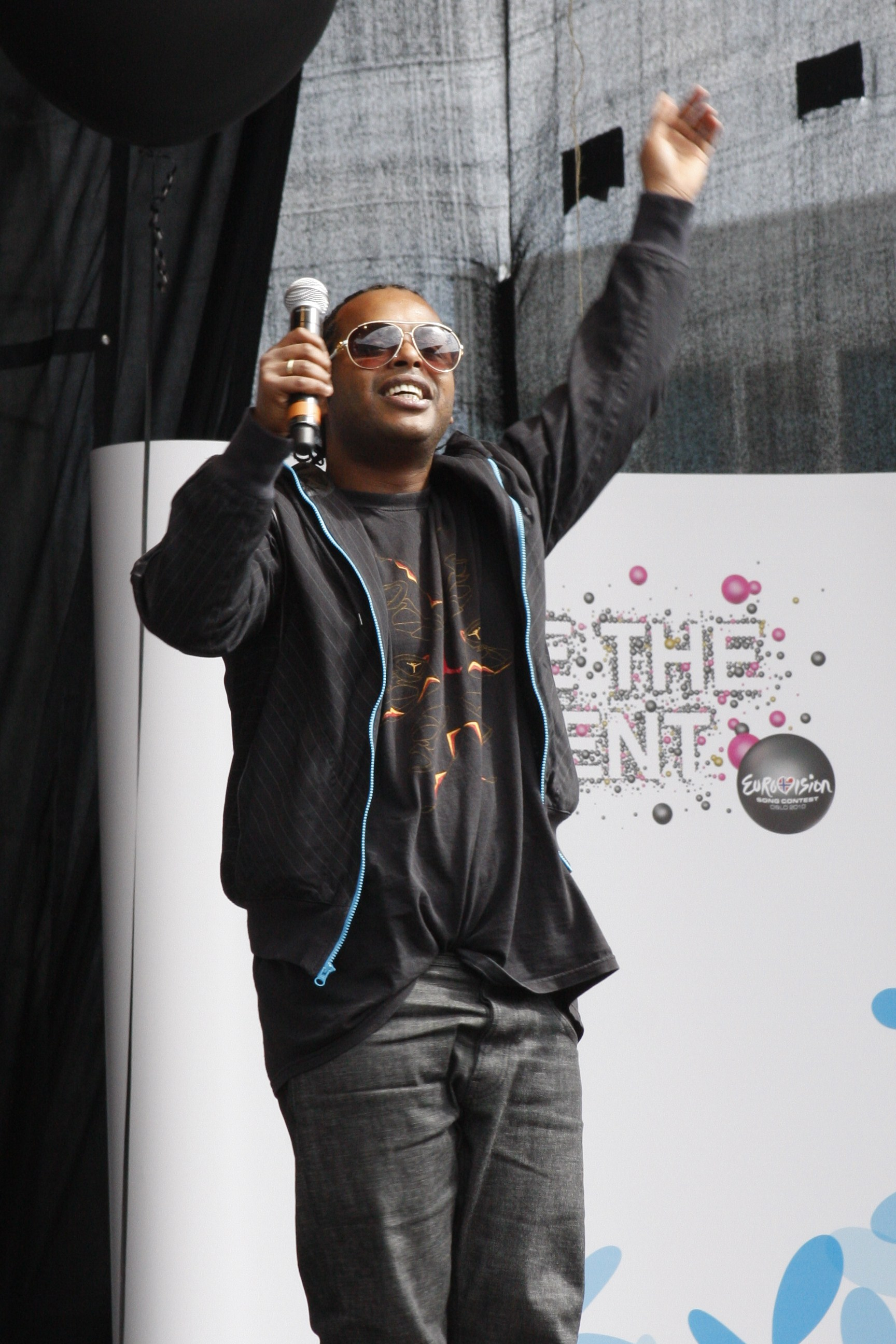
Yosef Wolde-Mariam

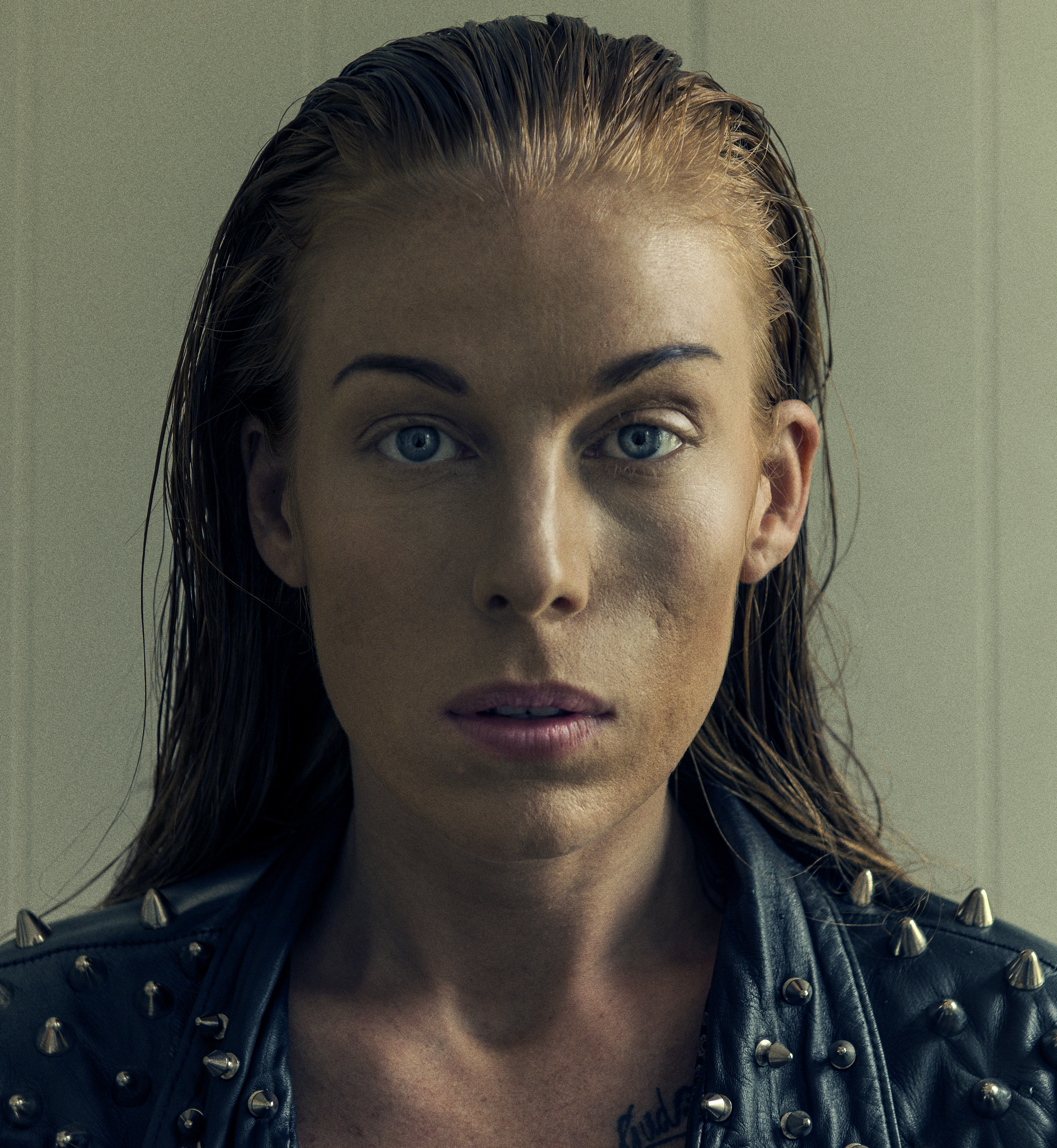
Gabrielle Leithaug

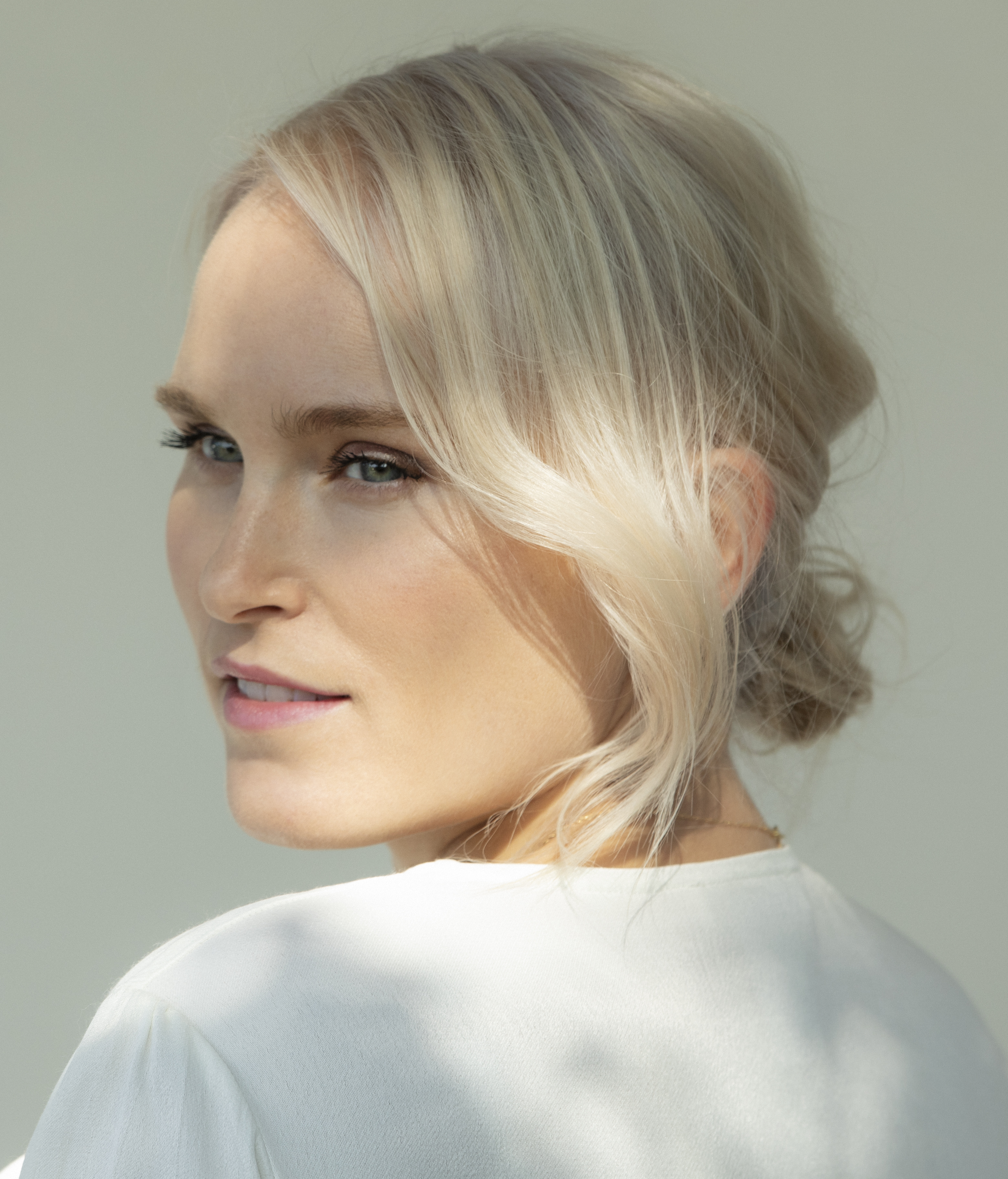
Eva Weel Skram

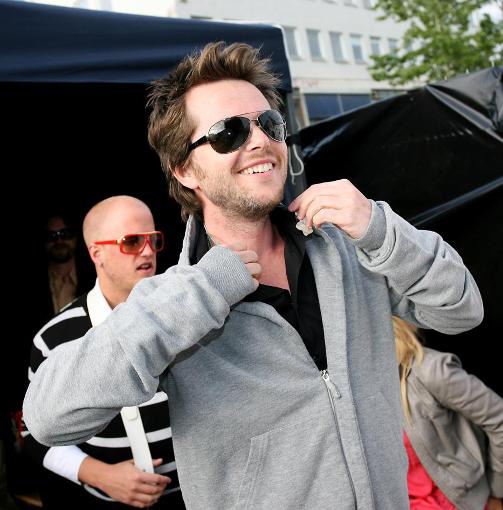
Espen Lind

Yosef Wolde-Mariam and Espen Lind returned as coaches from the previous season, while Gabrielle Leithaug and Eva Weel Skram joined the panel, following the exits of Jarle Bernhoft and Ina Wroldsen.

=== Teams ===
Colour key

- Winner
- Runner-Up
- Third Place
- Eliminated in the Semi-final
- Eliminated in the Playoffs
- Eliminated in the Knockouts
- Stolen in the Battles
- Eliminated in the Battles

Coaching teams
Coaches	Top 49 Artists				
Yosef Wolde-Mariam					
Yosef Wolde-Mariam	Andrea Holm	Oda Joberg	Victoria Spandow	Mathilde Høglo	Lavender
Yosef Wolde-Mariam	Morten Endresen	Benjamin Atkins	Nathalie Lyngholm	~~Simone Haaland~~	Silje Hagen
Yosef Wolde-Mariam	Celine Mork	Myriam Picot	Hedda Schmidt	Martin Wikstøl	
Gabrielle Leithaug					
Gabrielle Leithaug	Olivia Husabø	Sebby Mikkelsen	Marlen Tjøsvoll	Ingeborg Ruud	Ola Rønning
Gabrielle Leithaug	Martine Vidnes	Linnea Røisgård	Jonas Hovland	~~Natalie Beisland~~	~~Morten Endresen~~
Gabrielle Leithaug	~~Iselin Honningsvåg~~	~~Nathalie Lyngholm~~	Rifa Chowdhury	Sofie Rødskog	Benedicte Johansson
Eva Weel Skram					
Eva Weel Skram	Elida Waage	Simone Haaland	Maria Bjørkavoll	Nora Legrand	Jonas Peitersen
Eva Weel Skram	Karen Masao	Lukas Bjørkheim	Synne Mæland	~~Ola Rønning~~	Rebecca Johansen
Eva Weel Skram	Susanne Ruud	Mikael Johansen	Rakel Lervold	Thale Krogtoft	
Espen Lind					
Espen Lind	Herman Lie	Jonas Lovv	Karla Totland	Elisabeth Pearson	Bjørn Brandtenborg
Espen Lind	Steffen Jakobsen	Iselin Honningsvåg	Natalie Beisland	~~Lukas Bjørkheim~~	~~Marlen Tjøsvoll~~
Espen Lind	Aron Altinpinar	Are Sleveland	Benjamin Da Silva	Bente Ulleland	
Note: Italicized names are artists stolen from another team during the battles (names struck through within former teams).

== Blind auditions ==
The blind auditions began on 3 January. In the round, artists perform for the four coaches, whose chairs are turned away from the artist. If a coach is interested in working with the artist, they press a button to turn their chair. If only one coach turns, the artist defaults to their team. If multiple coaches turn, the artist picks their team. At the end of the blind auditions, each coach was to have twelve artists on their team. However, at the end of the blind auditions, Gabrielle Leithaug had thirteen artists on her team.

Blind auditions colour key
✔	Coach pressed the "JEG VELGER DEG" (I Want You) button
	Artist defaulted to this coach's team
	Artist elected to join this coach's team
	Artist was eliminated with no coach pressing their button
	Artist received an 'All Turn'.

=== Episode 1 (3 January) ===
Order	Artist	Age	Song	Coach's and artist's choices			
Order	Artist	Age	Song	Yosef	Gabrielle	Eva	Espen
1	Olivia Husabø	15	"Lovely"	✔	✔	✔	✔
2	Jonas Lovv	29	"Play That Funky Music"	✔	—	✔	✔
3	Maria Bjørkavoll	32	"Heim og min havn" (original song)	✔	✔	✔	✔
4	Jeremy Croos	-	"Mamma Mia"	—	—	—	—
5	Silje Hagen	42	"Love on the Brain"	✔	—	—	—
6	Morten Endresen	37	"A Change Is Gonna Come"	—	✔	—	—
7	Leanda Klingsheim	-	"Runaway"	—	—	—	—
8	Ola Rønning	32	"Hei, Her Er Jeg"	✔	✔	✔	✔

=== Episode 2 (10 January) ===
Order	Artist	Age	Song	Coach's and artist's choices			
Order	Artist	Age	Song	Yosef	Gabrielle	Eva	Espen
1	Karla Totland	21	"Riv i hjertet"	✔	✔	✔	✔
2	Andreas Hammersland	-	"Prince Ali"	—	—	—	—
3	Jonas Hovland	42	"Where I Find God"	✔	✔	✔	✔
4	Synne Mæland	24	"Helvegen"	✔	✔	✔	—
5	Mari Ose	-	"You Don't Do It for Me Anymore"	—	—	—	—
6	Andrea Holm	18	"Her"	✔	✔	✔	✔
7	Karen Masao	24	"Ready or Not"	—	—	✔	—
8	Carolina Kanestrøm	-	"Fall in Line"	—	—	—	—
9	Herman Lie	19	"Wicked Game"	✔	✔	✔	✔

=== Episode 3 (17 January) ===
Order	Artist	Age	Song	Coaches and artists choices			
Order	Artist	Age	Song	Yosef	Gabrielle	Eva	Espen
1	Benjamin Da Silva	25	"Nessun dorma"	—	✔	—	✔
2	Guro Hauge	-	"Kan du lære mæ?"	—	—	—	—
3	Nora Legrand	29	"Girl Crush"	—	✔	✔	✔
4	Simone Haaland	24	"Bittersweet"	✔	—	—	—
5	Ole Bowitz	-	"...Baby One More Time"	—	—	—	—
6	Ingeborg Ruud	17	"THE GREATEST"	✔	✔	✔	✔
7	Susanne Ruud	19	"Can't Catch Me Now"	—	✔	✔	—
8	Anders Tollefsen	-	"Vienna"	—	—	—	—
9	Elisabeth Pearson	43	"River"	✔	✔	✔	✔

=== Episode 4 (24 January) ===
Order	Artist	Age	Song	Coaches and artists choices			
Order	Artist	Age	Song	Yosef	Gabrielle	Eva	Espen
1	Marlen Tjøsvoll	32	"Bang Bang"	✔	✔	✔	✔
2	Lea Follo	-	"My Church"	—	—	—	—
3	Benedicte Johansson	29	"Runnin' (Lose It All)"	—	✔	—	—
4	Mathilde Høglo	19	"Valerie"	✔	—	✔	—
5	Iman Tobi	-	"Leave Me Lonely"	—	—	—	—
6	Sofie Rødskog	26	"Higher"	—	✔	✔	—
7	Lukas Bjørkheim	21	"Randy"	—	—	—	✔
8	Hannah Pedersen	-	"Narcissist"	—	—	—	—
9	Mikael Johansen	25	"Where's My Love"	✔	✔	✔	✔

=== Episode 5 (31 January) ===
Order	Artist	Age	Song	Coach's and artist's choices			
Order	Artist	Age	Song	Yosef	Gabrielle	Eva	Espen
1	Iselin Honningsvåg	32	"You Belong to Me"	✔	✔	✔	✔
2	Tracee Mey	-	"I Hope You Dance"	—	—	—	—
3	Steffen Jakobsen	34	"I'm Only Getting Started"	—	—	—	✔
4	Alexandra Corneeva	-	"Viva la Vida"	—	—	—	—
5	Hedda Schmidt	20	"Alright"	✔	—	—	—
6	Aron Altinpinar	25	"St. Peter"	✔	—	—	✔
7	Victoria Spandow	16	"Precious"	✔	—	—	—
8	Jakob Friis	-	"Have You Ever Seen The Rain"	—	—	—	—
9	Elida Waage	23	"Landslide"	✔	—	✔	✔

=== Episode 6 (7 February) ===
Order	Artist	Age	Song	Coach's and artist's choices			
Order	Artist	Age	Song	Yosef	Gabrielle	Eva	Espen
1	Nathalie Lyngholm	18	"Har du fyr?"	—	✔	—	✔
2	Lavender	20-23	"Vampire"	✔	—	—	—
3	Emil Markussen	-	"Where You're At"	—	—	—	—
4	Thale Krogtoft	36	"Heiemo og Nykkjen"	—	—	✔	—
5	Emilie Igland	-	"Blessed"	—	—	—	—
6	Benjamin Atkins	36	"Nobody Knows You"	✔	✔	—	—
7	Are Sleveland	47	"My Hero"	—	—	—	✔
8	Victoria Margaux	-	"Stand Up for Love"	—	—	—	—
9	Martine Vidnes	25	"Kozmic Blues"	✔	✔	✔	✔

=== Episode 7 (14 February) ===
Order	Artist	Age	Song	Coach's and artist's choices			
Order	Artist	Age	Song	Yosef	Gabrielle	Eva	Espen
1	Jonas Peitersen	29	"Last Request"	✔	—	✔	✔
2	Alice Hugøy	-	"Crazy in Love"	—	—	—	—
3	Linnea Røisgård	24	"En og annen"	—	✔	—	—
4	Myriam Picot	25	"Crazy"	✔	—	—	—
5	Jayson Ungria	-	"If I Ain't Got You"	—	—	—	—
6	Bente Ulleland	39	"Take It with Me"	—	—	—	✔
7	Celine Mork	23	"One and Only"	✔	—	—	—
8	Marita Fredly	-	"What If"	—	—	—	—
9	Sebby Mikkelsen	22	"Snow Angel"	✔	✔	✔	✔

=== Episode 8 (21 February) ===
Order	Artist	Age	Song	Coach's and artist's choices			
Order	Artist	Age	Song	Yosef	Gabrielle	Eva	Espen
1	Natalie Beisland	23	"Lover, Where Do You Live?"	✔	✔	—	✔
2	Martin Wikstol	38	"Den farligste friheten"	✔	—	—	—
3	Rakel Lervold	17	"Arms"	—	—	✔	—
4	Tor Braathen	-	"Bring Him Home"	—	—	—	—
5	Rifa Chowdhury	18	"Light On"	—	✔	—	—
6	Bjørn Brandtenborg	34	"God Don't Leave Me"	—	—	✔	✔
7	Rebecca Johansen	25	"Down to the Bottom"	—	—	✔	—
8	Heidi Lambach	-	"Gjennom ild" (Original Song)	—	—	—	—
9	Oda Joberg	23	"Songbird"	✔	✔	✔	✔

== Battles ==
The battles aired from 28 February to 21 March. In this round, each coach pairs two of their artists to sing a duet. The coach then selects one artist to move on while the other is either stolen by another coach or eliminated. Each coach has two steals.

Battles color key
Artist won the Battle and advanced to the Knockouts
Artist lost the Battle, but was stolen by another coach, and, advanced to the Knockouts
Artist lost the Battle and was eliminated

Battles results
Episode	Coach	Order	Winner	Song	Loser	'Steal result			
Episode	Coach	Order	Winner	Song	Loser	Yosef	Gabrielle	Eva	Espen
Episode 9 (28 February)	Gabrielle	1	Ingeborg Ruud	"Young and Beautiful"	Natalie Beisland	✔	—N/a	—	✔
Episode 9 (28 February)	Eva	2	Synne Mæland	"Bendik og Arolilja"	Thale Krogtoft	—	—	—N/a	—
Episode 9 (28 February)	Espen	3	Karla Totland	"ok jeg lover"	Aron Altinpinar	—	—	—	—N/a
Episode 9 (28 February)	Yosef	4	Andrea Holm	"Feels Like This"	Hedda Schmidt	—N/a	—	—	—
Episode 9 (28 February)	Espen	5	Jonas Lovv	"Bullet Me"	Are Sleveland	—	—	—	—N/a
Episode 9 (28 February)	Eva	6	Maria Bjørkavoll	"Hvis Verden"	Ola Rønning	—	✔	—N/a	—
Episode 10 (7 March)	Yosef	1	Mathilde Høglo	"American Boy"	Celine Mork	—N/a	—	—	—
Episode 10 (7 March)	Gabrielle	2	Jonas Hovland	"It Must Have Been Love"	Benedicte Johansson	—	—N/a	—	—
Episode 10 (7 March)	Eva	3	Karen Masao	"Glorie"	Rakel Lervold	—	—	—N/a	—
Episode 10 (7 March)	Espen	4	Bjørn Brandtenborg	"Some Things I'll Never Know"	Marlen Tjøsvoll	✔	✔	✔	—N/a
Episode 10 (7 March)	Yosef	5	Lavender	"Mirrors"	Martin Wikstol	—N/a	—	—	—
Episode 10 (7 March)	Gabrielle	6	Olivia Husabø	"Hopelessly Devoted To You"	Nathalie Lyngholm	✔	—N/a	✔	—
Episode 11 (14 March)	Gabrielle	1	Linnea Røisgård	"Hvis du bestemmer deg"	Iselin Honningsvåg	—	—N/a	—	✔
Episode 11 (14 March)	Eva	2	Jonas Peitersen	"The Scientist"	Mikael Johansen	—	—	—N/a	—
Episode 11 (14 March)	Espen	3	Steffen Jakobsen	"Won't Go Near You Again"	Bente Ulleland	—	—	—	—N/a
Episode 11 (14 March)	Yosef	4	Benjamin Atkins	"Roses"	Silje Hagen	—N/a	—	—	—
Episode 11 (14 March)	Gabrielle	5	Martine Vidnes	"Die with a Smile"	Sofie Rødskog	—	—N/a	—	—
Episode 11 (14 March)	Gabrielle	5	Martine Vidnes	"Die with a Smile"	Morten Endresen	✔	—N/a	—	—
Episode 11 (14 March)	Yosef	6	Oda Joberg	"hate to be lame"	Myriam Picot	—N/a	—	—	—
Episode 12 (21 March)	Yosef	1	Victoria Spandow	"Best Part"	Simone Haaland	—N/a	—	✔	—
Episode 12 (21 March)	Espen	2	Elisabeth Pearson	"Promise"	Benjamin Da Silva	—	—	—	—N/a
Episode 12 (21 March)	Eva	3	Nora Legrand	"The Chain"	Rebecca Hamnes Johansen	—	—	—N/a	—
Episode 12 (21 March)	Gabrielle	4	Sebby Mikkelsen	"Let Somebody Go"	Rifa Chowdhury	—	—N/a	—	—
Episode 12 (21 March)	Eva	5	Elida Waage	"Only a Fool"	Susanne Ruud	—	—	—N/a	—
Episode 12 (21 March)	Espen	6	Herman Lie	"With or Without You"	Lukas Bjørkheim	—	—	✔	—N/a

== The Knockouts ==
The knockouts began airing on 28 March. In this round, each coach pairs two of their artists to sing separate songs. Their coach then selects one artist to move on and the other is eliminated as there are no steals in the round.

Color key:

Artist won the Knockout and advanced to the Live Shows
Artist lost the Knockout and was eliminated

Episode	Coach	Order	Song	Artists		Song
Episode 13 (28 March)	Espen	1	"Whole Lotta Love"	Jonas Lovv	Natalie Beisland	"What's Left of Me"
Episode 13 (28 March)	Yosef	2	"Getting Older"	Mathilde Elisif Hoglo	Nathalie Lyngholm	"The House of the Rising Sun"
Episode 13 (28 March)	Eva	3	"I Belong to You"	Elida Waage	Synne E. Mæland	"Evig Hvile"
Episode 13 (28 March)	Gabrielle	4	"Sign of the Times"	Ingeborg Ruud	Jonas Hovland	"Stargazing"
Episode 14 (4 April)	Gabrielle	1	"Not About Angels"	Olivia Husabø	Linnea Røisgård	"Tenkt meg om"
Episode 14 (4 April)	Eva	2	"Drivers License"	Simone Haaland	Lukas Bjørkheim	"No Surprises"
Episode 14 (4 April)	Yosef	3	"Fra En Annen Virkelighet"	Victoria Spandow	Benjamin Atkins	"The Door"
Episode 14 (4 April)	Espen	4	"Elephant"	Herman Lie	Iselin Honningsvåg	"Some Die Young"
Episode 15 (11 April)	Espen	1	"Samurai Swords"	Karla Totland	Steffen Jakobsen	"Things Behind Things Behind Things"
Episode 15 (11 April)	Gabrielle	2	"Halo"	Marlen Tjosvoll	Martine Vidnes	"Running Up That Hill"
Episode 15 (11 April)	Eva	3	"Eg saknar deg mindre og mindre"	Maria Bjorkavoll	Karen Masao	"I See Red"
Episode 15 (11 April)	Yosef	4	"Stein På Stein"	Andrea Holm	Morten Endresen	"Beautiful Things"
Episode 16 (25 April)	Eva	1	"Believe"	Nora Legrand	Jonas Peitersen	"Revelry"
Episode 16 (25 April)	Gabrielle	2	"Incapable"	Sebby Mikkelsen	Ola Strand Ronning	"Glimpse of Us"
Episode 16 (25 April)	Yosef	3	"Helium"	Oda Joberg	Lavender	"Other People"
Episode 16 (25 April)	Espen	4	"Tougher Than the Rest"	Elisabeth Nygard-Pearson	Bjorn Henrik Brandtenborg	"Born to Be Alive"

== The Quarterfinals ==
The Live Shows began airing on 2 May. In this round, the artist pick a song and only three move on out of the eight allowed. At the end of the round, Eva Weel Skram no longer had any artists on her team.

Color key:

Artist received enough votes and advanced to the Semi-Finals
Artist lost the quarterfinals and was eliminated

Episode	Coach	Order	Artist	Song	Result
Episode 17 (May 2nd, 2025)	Yosef	1	Oda Joberg	"Rise Up"	Public's vote
Episode 17 (May 2nd, 2025)	Eva	2	Nora Legrand	"When I Come Home" (Original Song)	Eliminated
Episode 17 (May 2nd, 2025)	Espen	3	Elisabeth Pearson	"Majesty"	Eliminated
Episode 17 (May 2nd, 2025)	Eva	4	Maria Bjørkavoll	"Bak ein sky heim"	Eliminated
Episode 17 (May 2nd, 2025)	Gabrielle	5	Olivia Husabø	"Euphoria"	Public's vote
Episode 17 (May 2nd, 2025)	Yosef	6	Mathilde Høglo	"Put Your Records On"	Eliminated
Episode 17 (May 2nd, 2025)	Espen	7	Herman Lie	"Hollow Talk"	Public's vote
Episode 17 (May 2nd, 2025)	Gabrielle	8	Ingeborg Ruud	"Lose You To Love Me"	Eliminated
Episode 18 (May 9th, 2025)	Gabrielle	1	Sebby Mikkelsen	"Arcade"	Eliminated
Episode 18 (May 9th, 2025)	Eva	2	Elida Waage	"Ordinary World"	Eliminated
Episode 18 (May 9th, 2025)	Yosef	3	Victoria Spandow	"Erase Me"	Eliminated
Episode 18 (May 9th, 2025)	Eva	4	Simone Haaland	"Messy"	Eliminated
Episode 18 (May 9th, 2025)	Yosef	5	Andrea Holm	"Jar of Hearts"	Public's vote
Episode 18 (May 9th, 2025)	Gabrielle	6	Marlen Tjosvoll	"Yesterday"	Eliminated
Episode 18 (May 9th, 2025)	Espen	7	Jonas Lovv	"Grace Kelly"	Public's vote
Episode 18 (May 9th, 2025)	Espen	8	Karla Totland	"Stille vann"	Public's vote

== The Semifinal ==
For the first time in the history of the show, only three artists moved on to the final. With the advancement of Olivia Husabø, Gabrielle Leithaug became the eighth debuting coach to successfully bring her team to the final, following Espen Lind, Lene Nystrøm, Tommy Tee, Lene Marlin, Morten Harket, Matoma, and Ina Wroldsen.

Episode	Coach	Order	Artist	Song	Result
Episode 19 (May 16th, 2025)	Yosef	1	Oda Joberg	"Strong"	Eliminated
Episode 19 (May 16th, 2025)	Espen	2	Karla Totland	"E ha aldri"	Eliminated
Episode 19 (May 16th, 2025)	Yosef	3	Andrea Holm	"Oslo"	Public's vote
Episode 19 (May 16th, 2025)	Gabrielle	4	Olivia Husabø	"You Say"	Public's vote
Episode 19 (May 16th, 2025)	Espen	5	Jonas Lovv	"Love of My Life"	Eliminated
Episode 19 (May 16th, 2025)	Espen	6	Herman Lie	"Forever Young"	Public's vote

== Finale ==
Andrea Bredesen Holm won the competition, marking Yosef Wolde-Mariam's first and only win during his tenure as a coach.
