= The Voice – Norges beste stemme season 11 =

2026 season of Norwegian television series

The Voice – Norges beste stemme
- Season 11
- Promotional poster featuring coaches Bratland, Lind, Bernhoft, and Raven
- Hosted by: Siri Avlesen-Østli
- Coaches: Ingebjørg Bratland; Espen Lind; Marion Raven; Jarle Bernhoft
- No. of contestants: 50
- Winner: Eskil Fossum
- Winning coach: Ingebjørg Bratland
- Runner-up: André Nesheim

Release
- Original release: 9 January – 29 May 2026

Season chronology
- ← Previous; Season 10

The eleventh season of The Voice – Norges beste stemme (The Voice – Norway's Best Voice) is a talent show which premiered on 9 January 2026. Only Espen Lind returned as a coach from the previous season. Jarle Bernhoft returned for his third season as a coach, following a one-season hiatus. Debutants Ingebjørg Bratland and Marion Raven joined the panel as coaches this season. Additionally, Siri Avlesen-Østli returned for her fifth season as host.

Eskil Fossum won the competition on 29 May 2026, marking Ingebjørg Bratland's first win as a coach. Fossum became the second one-chair turn artist to win in the show's history, after Erlend Gunstveit in the sixth season. With Fossum's win, Bratland became the fourth coach to win on his/her debut season. Additionally, Bratland was the first coach in the show's history (and second worldwide) to have all finalists on his/her team.

== Coaches ==
Coaches of The Voice – Norges beste stemme season 11

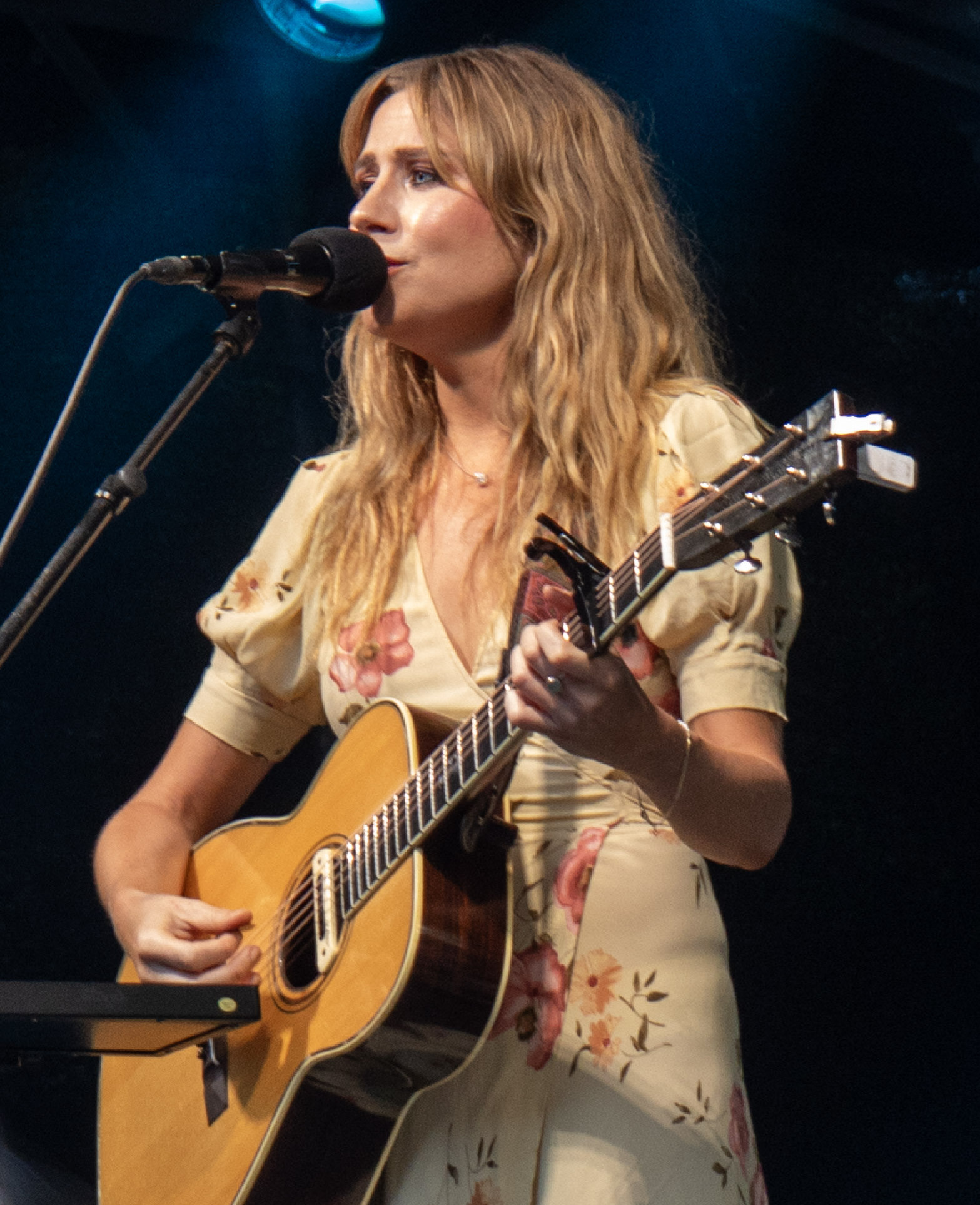
Ingebjørg Bratland

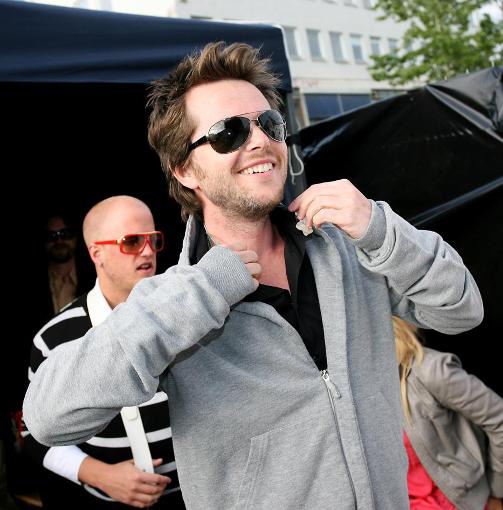
Espen Lind

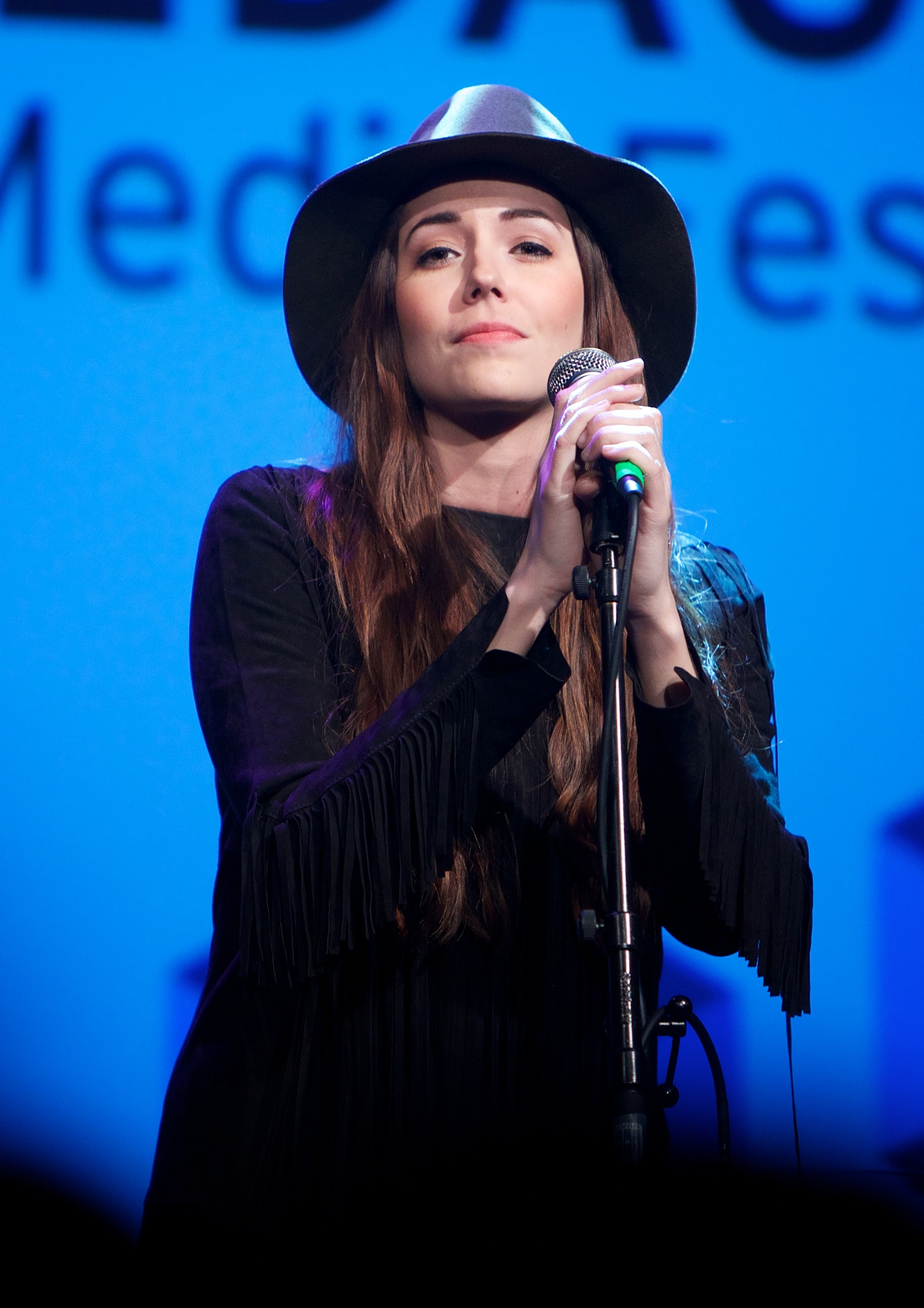
Marion Raven

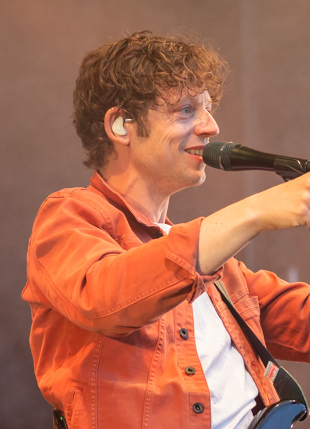
Jarle Bernhoft

Of the four coaches in the previous season, only Espen Lind returned, marking his eighth season as a coach. Jarle Bernhoft returned for his third season as a coach following a one-season hiatus, replacing Yosef Wolde-Mariam. Ingebjørg Bratland and Marion Raven both joined the panel as debuting coaches, following the exits of Gabrielle Leithaug and Eva Weel Skram.

== Teams ==
Colour key

- Winner
- Runner-Up
- Third Place
- Eliminated in the Semi-final
- Eliminated in the Quarterfinals
- Eliminated in the Knockouts
- Stolen in the Battles
- Eliminated in the Battles

Coaching teams
Coaches	Top 50 Artists				
Ingebjørg Bratland					
Ingebjørg Bratland	Eskil Fossum	André Nesheim	Nora Banne	Sofia Loise	Nora Hansen
Ingebjørg Bratland	Alisa Ilinskaya	Lina Randen	Rebekka Vedøy	~~Joakim Bjermeland~~	~~Gina Eickstedt~~
Ingebjørg Bratland	Vegard Eidsheim	Eirik Fredsrud	Anna Hjelen	Elise Olsen	
Espen Lind					
Espen Lind	Trym Bjønnes	Leo Blix	Magnus Pedersen	Peter Estdahl	Tiril Beisland
Espen Lind	Mathilda Bonnevier	Fredrick Kaasa	Maja Sasinia	~~Nora Hansen~~	~~Marie Lerkendal~~
Espen Lind	Edvard Aadland	Johanne Møllerbråten	Emily Riccardi	Adrian Røren	
Marion Raven					
Marion Raven	Birgitte Velsvik	Betina Linstad	Thea Meyer	Maia Milano	Joakim Bjermeland
Marion Raven	Håvard Husevåg	Andreas Johansen	Oliver Pettersen	~~Tiril Beisland~~	Sofia Berntsen
Marion Raven	Mads Henriksen	Thomas Isaksen	Marion Range	Synnøve Stulien	Vanja Vatle
Jarle Bernhoft					
Jarle Bernhoft	Anders Strøm	Selma Poole	Sara Tveit	Mikael Zakariassen	Samuel Balsnes
Jarle Bernhoft	Gina Eickstedt	Marie Lerkendal	André Søfteland	~~Peter Estdahl~~	~~Håvard Husevåg~~
Jarle Bernhoft	~~André Nesheim~~	Frimann Bustad	Sven Henriksen	Sylvia Morgan	Rebecka Skilbred
Note: Italicized names are artists stolen from another team during the battles (names struck through within former teams).

== Blind auditions ==
The blind auditions began on 9 January. In the round, artists perform for the four coaches, whose chairs are turned away from the artist. If a coach is interested in working with the artist, he/she presses a button to turn their chair. If only one coach turns, the artist defaults to his/her team. If multiple coaches turn, the artist picks his/her team. At the end of the blind auditions, each coach was to have twelve artists on his/her team. However, at the end of the blind auditions, Marion Raven and Jarle Bernhoft each had thirteen artists on their team.

Blind auditions colour key
✔	Coach pressed the "JEG VELGER DEG" (I Want You) button
	Artist defaulted to this coach's team
	Artist elected to join this coach's team
	Artist was eliminated with no coach pressing their button
	Artist received an 'All Turn'.

=== Episode 1 (9 January) ===
Order	Artist	Age	Song	Coach's and artist's choices			
Order	Artist	Age	Song	Ingebjørg	Espen	Marion	Jarle
1	Maia Milano	19	"Voilà"	✔	✔	✔	✔
2	Trym Bjønnes	44	"Birds"	✔	✔	✔	✔
3	Olly Jacobsen	—N/a	"What a Wonderful World"	—	—	—	—
4	Joakim Bjermeland	33	"Undercover"	✔	—	✔	—
5	Vegard Eidsheim	19	"Love Like This"	✔	✔	✔	—
6	Selma Poole	18	"If You Wait"	✔	✔	✔	✔
7	Louisa Wergeland	—N/a	"Dive"	—	—	—	—
8	Marie Lerkendal	33	"Jorda"	✔	✔	✔	✔

=== Episode 2 (16 January) ===
Order	Artist	Age	Song	Coach's and artist's choices			
Order	Artist	Age	Song	Ingebjørg	Espen	Marion	Jarle
1	Mikael Zakariassen	21	"Heal"	✔	✔	✔	✔
2	Dorthea Flo	—N/a	"She Used to Be Mine"	—	—	—	—
3	Nora Banne	25	"Remedy"	✔	—	✔	—
4	Betina Linstad	19	"Love the Hell Out of You"	—	—	✔	—
5	Adrian Røren	25	"Selvskudd"	—	✔	—	—
6	Ida Brevik	—N/a	"Too Sweet"	—	—	—	—
7	Sofia Loise	26	"All the Things I Want to Tell U" (original song)	✔	✔	✔	✔
8	Marion Range	34	"Don't Forget Me"	—	✔	✔	✔
9	Leo Blix	39	"No Surprises"	✔	✔	✔	—

=== Episode 3 (23 January) ===
Order	Artist	Age	Song	Coach's and artist's choices			
Order	Artist	Age	Song	Ingebjørg	Espen	Marion	Jarle
1	André Søfteland	45	"I (Who Have Nothing)"	✔	✔	✔	✔
2	Lina Randen	21	"Hvis jeg var en Fugl"	✔	—	✔	✔
3	Nora Rosenberg	—N/a	"Mirror"	—	—	—	—
4	Eskil Fossum	23	"Die Alone"	✔	—	—	—
5	Tiril Beisland	23	"For Love" (Original Song)	—	—	✔	—
6	Anders Strøm	34	"Wondering Why"	✔	✔	—	✔
7	Sara Tveit	19	"Yebba's Heartbreak"	—	—	—	✔
8	Irina Veivåg	—N/a	"Tears Dry on Their Own"	—	—	—	—
9	Magnus Pedersen	28	"Something in the Orange"	✔	✔	✔	✔

=== Episode 4 (30 January) ===
Order	Artist	Age	Song	Coach's and artist's choices			
Order	Artist	Age	Song	Ingebjørg	Espen	Marion	Jarle
1	Samuel Balsnes	20	"Brown Eyed Lover"	✔	✔	✔	✔
2	Rebekka Vedøy	30	"Cowboy Take Me Away"	✔	—	—	—
3	Maja Sasinia	23	"Mellabar" (original song)	✔	✔	✔	—
4	Thea Meyer	29	"Whole Lotta Love"	—	—	✔	—
5	Anna Sælen	—N/a	"All I Want"	—	—	—	—
6	Fredrick Kaasa	35	"Both Sides, Now"	—	✔	✔	—
7	Andreas Mørland	—N/a	"Vår Beste Dag"	—	—	—	—
8	Mari Stinussen	—N/a	"Hypotheticals"	—	—	—	—
9	Elise Olsen	27	"The Closest Thing to Crazy"	✔	—	✔	—

=== Episode 5 (6 February) ===
Order	Artist	Age	Song	Coach's and artist's choices			
Order	Artist	Age	Song	Ingebjørg	Espen	Marion	Jarle
1	Oliver Pettersen	22	"Monsters"	✔	—	✔	—
2	Alisa Ilinskaya	29	"Seven Nation Army"	✔	—	—	—
3	Helene Blom-Ohlsen	—N/a	"How to Disappear Completely"	—	—	—	—
4	Mathilda Bonnevier	26	"The Lion's Roar"	✔	✔	✔	—
5	Sandra Szabo	—N/a	"Don't Stop Believin'"	—	—	—	—
6	Frimann Bustad	27	"How I Like It" (original song)	✔	—	—	✔
7	Madeleine Christensen	—N/a	"Rise Up"	—	—	—	—
8	Mads Henriksen	29	"Forever Young"	—	—	✔	—
9	Nora Hansen	33	"Folk i Husan"	✔	✔	✔	✔

=== Episode 6 (13 February) ===
Order	Artist	Age	Song	Coach's and artist's choices			
Order	Artist	Age	Song	Ingebjørg	Espen	Marion	Jarle
1	Johanne Møllerbråten	28	"Liten Egoist" (original song)	✔	✔	✔	✔
2	Trym Hagaliam	—N/a	"Folsom Prison Blues"	—	—	—	—
3	Sylvia Morgan	23	"Levitating"	—	—	—	✔
4	Thomas Isaksen	43	"All My Love"	—	—	✔	—
5	Sol Geirsdottir	—N/a	"Trøllabudin"	—	—	—	—
6	André Nesheim	30	"Turning Tables"	✔	✔	—	✔
7	Vanja Vatle	25	"In the Stars"	✔	✔	✔	—
8	Hanne Boudreaux	—N/a	"Devil Wears Denim"	—	—	—	—
9	Anna Hjelen	21	"Funeral"	✔	—	✔	—

=== Episode 7 (20 February) ===
Order	Artist	Age	Song	Coach's and artist's choices			
Order	Artist	Age	Song	Ingebjørg	Espen	Marion	Jarle
1	Birgitte Velsvik	42	"Golden Slumbers/Carry That Weight"	✔	✔	✔	—
2	Sara Helen	—N/a	"Heart on the Table" (original song)	—	—	—	—
3	Eirik Fredsrud	29	"Put Your Head on My Shoulder"	✔	—	—	—
4	Rakel Mitrovic	—N/a	"Part of Your World"	—	—	—	—
5	Rebecka Skilbred	29	"Sweet Little Rainbows"	—	—	—	✔
6	Edvard Aadland	25	"Don't Think Twice, It's All Right"	✔	✔	✔	✔
7	Synnøve Stulien	23	"Evidence"	—	—	✔	—
8	Ella Leinsvang	—N/a	"White Horse"	—	—	—	—
9	Håvard Husevåg	27	"Bed I Made"	✔	—	—	✔

=== Episode 8 (27 February) ===
Order	Artist	Age	Song	Coach's and artist's choices			
Order	Artist	Age	Song	Ingebjørg	Espen	Marion	Jarle
1	Emily Riccardi		"Wish You Well"	—	✔	✔	—
2	Sofia Berntsen		"Save Me a Seat" (original song)	—	—	✔	—
3	Gina Eickstedt	29	"October Sky"	✔	—	✔	—
4	Benjamin Christensen	—N/a	"He's a Tramp"	—	—	—	—
5	Peter Estdahl		"When"	✔	✔	✔	✔
6	Henry Liadal	—N/a	"Summertime Sadness"	—	—	—	—
7	Sven Henriksen		"Chocolate Jesus"	✔	✔	✔	✔
8	Trygve Julian	—N/a	"Unchained Melody"	—	—	—	—
9	Andreas Johansen		"Twilight"	—	—	✔	—

== Battles ==
The battles aired from 6 March to 27 March. In this round, each coach pairs two of their artists to sing a duet. The coach then selects one artist to move on while the other is either stolen by another coach or eliminated. Each coach has two steals.

Battles color key
Artist won the Battle and advanced to the Knockouts
Artist lost the Battle, but was stolen by another coach, and, advanced to the Knockouts
Artist lost the Battle and was eliminated

Battles results
Episode	Coach	Order	Winner	Song	Loser	'Steal result			
Episode	Coach	Order	Winner	Song	Loser	Ingebjørg	Espen	Marion	Jarle
Episode 9 (6 March)	Ingebjørg	1	Nora Banne	"Drivers License"	Gina Eickstedt	—N/a	—	—	✔
Episode 9 (6 March)	Jarle	2	André Søfteland	"Easy Lover"	Frimann Bustad	—	—	—	—N/a
Episode 9 (6 March)	Espen	3	Magnus Pedersen	"Bak en fasade"	Johanne Møllerbråten	—	—N/a	—	—
Episode 9 (6 March)	Marion	4	Birgitte Velsvik	"Defying Gravity"	Marion Range	—	—	—N/a	—
Episode 9 (6 March)	Ingebjørg	5	Alisa Ilinskaya	"MMMBop"	Elise Olsen	—N/a	—	—	—
Episode 9 (6 March)	Jarle	6	Sara Tveit	"Lover, Please Stay"	Peter Estdahl	✔	✔	✔	—N/a
Episode 10 (13 March)	Jarle	1	Mikael Zakariassen	"Hold Back the River"	André Nesheim	✔	—	—	—N/a
Episode 10 (13 March)	Espen	2	Maja Sasinia	"That's So True"	Emily Riccardi	—	—N/a	—	—
Episode 10 (13 March)	Marion	3	Betina Linstad	"Good Luck, Babe!"	Synnøve Stulien	—	—	—N/a	—
Episode 10 (13 March)	Marion	3	Betina Linstad	"Good Luck, Babe!"	Tiril Beisland	—	✔	—N/a	—
Episode 10 (13 March)	Ingebjørg	4	Eskil Fossum	"Death with Dignity"	Vegard Eidsheim	—N/a	—	—	—
Episode 10 (13 March)	Jarle	5	Anders Strøm	"The Boys Are Back in Town"	Sven Henriksen	—	—	—	—N/a
Episode 10 (13 March)	Marion	6	Oliver Pettersen	"If You Love Her"	Vanja Vatle	—	—	—N/a	—
Episode 11 (20 March)	Jarle	1	Selma Poole	"Morning is Made"	Håvard Husevåg	—	—	✔	—N/a
Episode 11 (20 March)	Espen	2	Mathilda Bonnevier	"Maniac"	Adrian Røren	—	—N/a	—	—
Episode 11 (20 March)	Ingebjørg	3	Rebekka Vedøy	"Need You Now"	Anna Hjelen	—N/a	—	—	—
Episode 11 (20 March)	Marion	4	Thea Meyer	"Somewhere Out There"	Thomas Isaksen	—	—	—N/a	—
Episode 11 (20 March)	Marion	5	Maia Milano	"I Love You, I'm Sorry"	Sofia Berntsen	—	—	—N/a	—
Episode 11 (20 March)	Espen	6	Trym Bjønnes	"Little Blue"	Nora Hansen	✔	—N/a	—	—
Episode 12 (27 March)	Espen	1	Leo Blix	"Don't Give Up"	Marie Lerkendal	—	—N/a	—	✔
Episode 12 (27 March)	Ingebjørg	2	Lina Randen	"Ingen here Den"	Eirik Fredsrud	—N/a	—	—	—
Episode 12 (27 March)	Jarle	3	Samuel Balsnes	"How Deep Is Your Love"	Sylvia Morgan	—	—	—	—N/a
Episode 12 (27 March)	Jarle	3	Samuel Balsnes	"How Deep Is Your Love"	Rebecka Skilbred	—	—	—	—N/a
Episode 12 (27 March)	Marion	4	Andreas Johansen	"My Silver Lining"	Mads Henriksen	—	—	—N/a	—
Episode 12 (27 March)	Espen	5	Fredrick Kaasa	"Dust in the Wind"	Edvard Aadland	—	—N/a	—	—
Episode 12 (27 March)	Ingebjørg	6	Sofia Loise	"/Golden"	Joakim Bjermeland	—	—	✔	—

== Knockouts ==
The knockouts began airing on 10 April. In this round, each coach pairs two of their artists to sing separate songs. Their coach then selects one artist to move on and the other is eliminated. There are no steals in the round.

Color key:

Artist won the Knockout and advanced to the Live Shows
Artist lost the Knockout and was eliminated

Episode	Coach	Order	Song	Artists		Song
Episode 13 (10 April)	Ingebjørg	1	"Loud"	Nora Banne	Nora Hansen	"Jeg reiser alene"
Episode 13 (10 April)	Espen	2	"Miracle Love"	Peter Estdahl	Maja Sasinia	"Alt feil"
Episode 13 (10 April)	Marion	3	"Edge of Seventeen"	Thea Meyer	Oliver Pettersen	"I Can't Do This"
Episode 13 (10 April)	Jarle	4	"The Spirit Carries On"	Anders Strøm	Marie Lerkendal	"Vi Lovar (Besvärjelse)"
Episode 14 (17 April)	Ingebjørg	1	"Ta det meg med"	Sofia Loise	Rebekka Vedøy	"Any Man of Mine
Episode 14 (17 April)	Espen	2	"When You Were Young"	Leo Blix	Tiril Beisland	"So Easy (To Fall in Love)"
Episode 14 (17 April)	Marion	3	"My Way"	Birgitte Velsvik	Joakim Bjermeland	"Litt Lengre"
Episode 14 (17 April)	Jarle	4	"Die on This Hill"	Selma Poole	Gina Eickstedt	"Paper Hearts"
Episode 15 (24 April)	Espen	1	"Hjerteknuser"	Magnus Pedersen	Fredrick Kaasa	"Wichita Lineman"
Episode 15 (24 April)	Marion	2	"Vi er perfekt men verden er ikke det"	Maia Milano	Andreas Johansen	"Alonica"
Episode 15 (24 April)	Ingebjørg	3	"Used to Be"	André Nesheim	Lina Haug	"The Moon Is a Harsh Mistress"
Episode 15 (24 April)	Jarle	4	"Worth It"	Sara Tveit	Andre Søfteland	"With a Little Help from My Friends"
Episode 16 (1 May)	Espen	1	"Mad World"	Trym Bjønnes	Mathilda Bonnevier	"Nothing You Can Take From Me"
Episode 16 (1 May)	Marion	2	"Ghost Story"	Betina Linstad	Håvard Husevåg	"Everglow"
Episode 16 (1 May)	Ingebjørg	3	"Orange Juice"	Eskil Fossum	Alisa Ilinskaya	"Evergreen"
Episode 16 (1 May)	Jarle	4	"I'm Not The Only One"	Mikael Zakariassen	Samuel Balsnes	"Look Who's Laughing Now"

== The Quarterfinals ==
The Live Shows began airing on 8 May. In this round, the artist pick a song and only four move on out of the eight allowed. At the end of the round, Teams Ingebjørg and Espen both had three artists each advance to the semifinals and Teams Marion and Jarle had one artist each advance.

Color key:

Artist received enough votes and advanced to the Semi-Finals
Artist lost the quarterfinals and was eliminated

Episode	Coach	Order	Artist	Song	Result
Episode 17 (8 May)	Espen Lind	1	Trym Bjønnes	"Grace"	Public's vote
Episode 17 (8 May)	Marion Raven	2	Thea Meyer	"Golden"	Eliminated
Episode 17 (8 May)	Jarle Bernhoft	3	Sara Tveit	"These Eyes"	Eliminated
Episode 17 (8 May)	Ingebjørg Bratland	4	Nora Banne	"I Drink Wine"	Public's vote
Episode 17 (8 May)	Jarle Bernhoft	5	Mikael Zakariassen	"jeg holder pusten til du drar"	Eliminated
Episode 17 (8 May)	Marion Raven	6	Maia Milano	"Siste Dans"	Eliminated
Episode 17 (8 May)	Espen Lind	7	Magnus Pedersen	"Håper du har plass"	Public's vote
Episode 17 (8 May)	Ingebjørg Bratland	8	André Nesheim	"Sapling"	Public's vote
Episode 18 (15 May)	Ingebjørg Bratland	1	Sofia Loise	"Lover, Where Do You Live?"	Eliminated
Episode 18 (15 May)	Jarle Bernhoft	2	Selma Poole	"Midnight Sun"	Eliminated
Episode 18 (15 May)	Espen Lind	3	Peter Estdahl	"Man I Need"	Eliminated
Episode 18 (15 May)	Espen Lind	4	Leo Blix	"The Sun Always Shines on T.V."	Public's vote
Episode 18 (15 May)	Ingebjørg Bratland	5	Eskil Fossum	"Black Friday"	Public's vote
Episode 18 (15 May)	Marion Raven	6	Birgitte Velsvik	"Je suis malade"	Public's vote
Episode 18 (15 May)	Marion Raven	7	Betina Linstad	"Going, Going, Gone"	Eliminated
Episode 18 (15 May)	Jarle Bernhoft	8	Anders Strøm	"Make You Feel My Love"	Public's vote

== The Semifinal ==
The semifinal aired on 22 May. Like the previous season, only three artists moved on to the final.

With the advancements of Nora Banne, Eskil Fossum, and André Nesheim, Ingebjørg Bratland became the ninth debuting coach to successfully bring her team to the final, following Espen Lind, Lene Nystrøm, Tommy Tee, Lene Marlin, Morten Harket, Matoma, Ina Wroldsen, and Gabrielle Leithaug. Additionally, only Bratland's three artists progressed to the final, marking the first ever occurrence of only one coach being represented in the final and the winning coach being known prior to the final in the history of The Voice – Norges beste stemme, as well as the second time across The Voice franchise that such events occurred, following Gökhan Özoğuz's instance in the third season of O Ses Türkiye.

Episode	Coach	Order	Artist	Song	Result
Episode 19 (22 May)	Ingebjørg Bratland	1	Eskil Fossum	"Brother"	Public's vote
Episode 19 (22 May)	Jarle Bernhoft	2	Anders Strøm	"Rolling In The Deep"	Eliminated
Episode 19 (22 May)	Espen Lind	3	Magnus Pedersen	"Jeg skal finne deg"	Eliminated
Episode 19 (22 May)	Espen Lind	4	Leo Blix	"Don’t You Worry Child"	Eliminated
Episode 19 (22 May)	Ingebjørg Bratland	5	André Hustoft Nesheim	"På bredden"	Public's vote
Episode 19 (22 May)	Marion Raven	6	Brigitte Velsvik	"This Is Me"	Eliminated
Episode 19 (22 May)	Espen Lind	7	Trym Bjønnes	"Frozen"	Eliminated
Episode 19 (22 May)	Ingebjørg Bratland	8	Nora Banne	"The Winner Takes It All"	Public's vote

== Finale ==
The finale aired on 29 May. In this round, the remaining three artists each perform a solo song and a performance with his/her coach (Ingebjørg Bratland for all three artists). Espen Lind, Marion Raven, and Jarle Bernhoft, all having no finalists, each were assigned to sing with one of the finalists with Bratland; thus, the finalists' non-solo performances were trio performances. At the end of the show, the winner of the season was announced from the public's vote.

Eskil Fossum was announced as the winner of the season, marking Ingebjørg Bratland's first win as a coach.

Finale results
Coach	Contestant	Solo song	Trio song	Result
Ingebjørg Bratland	Eskil Fossum	"För kärlekens skull"	"Kom som du er" (with Bratland and Lind)	Winner
Ingebjørg Bratland	André Nesheim	"Remember My Name"	"Fields of Gold" (with Bratland and Bernhoft)	Runner-up
Ingebjørg Bratland	Nora Banne	"The Visitor"	"For vår jord" (with Bratland and Raven)	Third place
