= Kristian Kristensen =

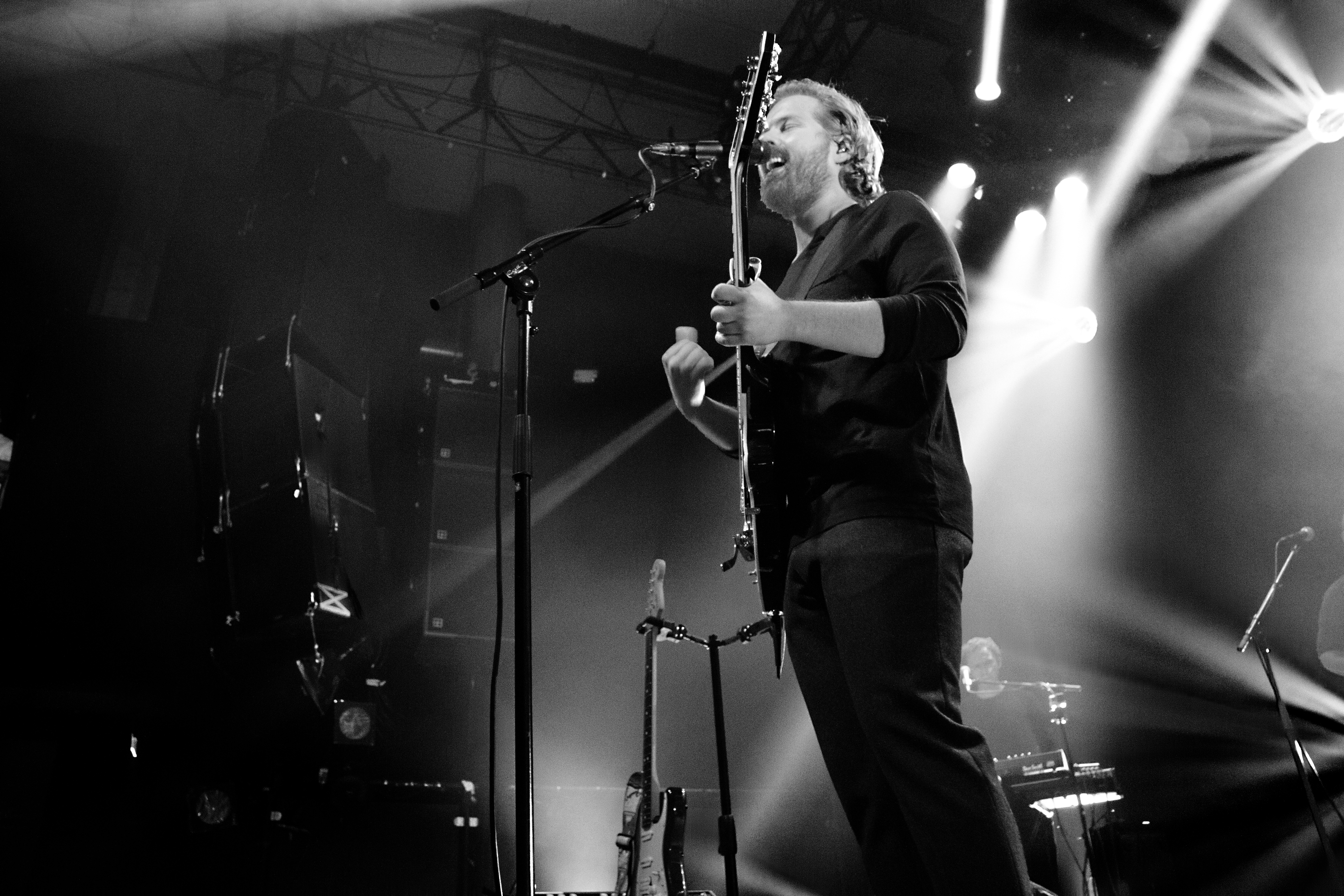
- _{Kristian Kristensen at Rockefeller}

Background information
- Born: 12 May 1992 (age 34); Harstad, Norway
- Genres: pop, singer/songwriter
- Years active: 2013–present
- Label: Warner Music Norway
- Website: www.kristiankristensen.no

Kristian Kristensen (born 12 May 1992) is a Norwegian singer/songwriter from Harstad, Norway. He started his solo career in 2013 through the Norwegian TV-show The Voice, and signed with Warner Music Norway in 2015.

== Career ==
Ahead of his participation in The Voice, Kristian and the rest of his bandmates in No Name – No Fame tried to reach success through the Norwegian TV-show The X Factor back in 2009. The band never made it through to the finals, but four years later Kristian made it through to the semi-finals in The Voice as a solo act.

In the years between 2013 and 2015 Kristian worked on writing and composing his own music, and in 2015 he made it through to the final round of NRK P3s "Urørt" with the song «Lyset».

Since his signing with the major label, he released a number of singles before the release of his debut EP in 2015. The EP «Før Det Blir For Seint» consists of 6 tracks, which are all written and performed in his hometown accent, with the exception of «Nella Fantasia».

=== Live ===
As a contestant on several Norwegian TV-shows, Kristian started his live career at an early age. After his signing he went on a tour around Norway, including shows in the big cities Stavanger, Bergen, Trondheim and Oslo. He also performed live during a radio show which was held in connection with the Norwegian industry festival by:Larm. This was the second consecutive year he held a live performance at the festival, seeing as NRKs Urørt is also in connection to by:Larm.

== Discography ==
Albums

- Samger fra Hver gang vi møtes (2023)
- 2003 (2022)
- Kor vi ende (2019)

EPs

- Living Room Sessions (2020)
- Gressholmen (2017)
- Før det blir for seint (2016)

Singles

- "Lyset" (2015)
- "Rusen våkner igjen" (2015)
- "Kan du lære mæ?" (2016)
- "Du som snakke" (2016)
- "Varm" (2016)

== Awards and nominations ==
Year	Organization	Award	Work	Result
2017	Spellemannprisen	Årets Låt (Song of the Year)	"Kan Du Lære Mæ?"	Nominated
2017	Musikkforleggerprisen	Årets verk, populærmusikk (Track of the Year)	"Kan Du Lære Mæ?"	Won
