= Ingebjørg Bratland =

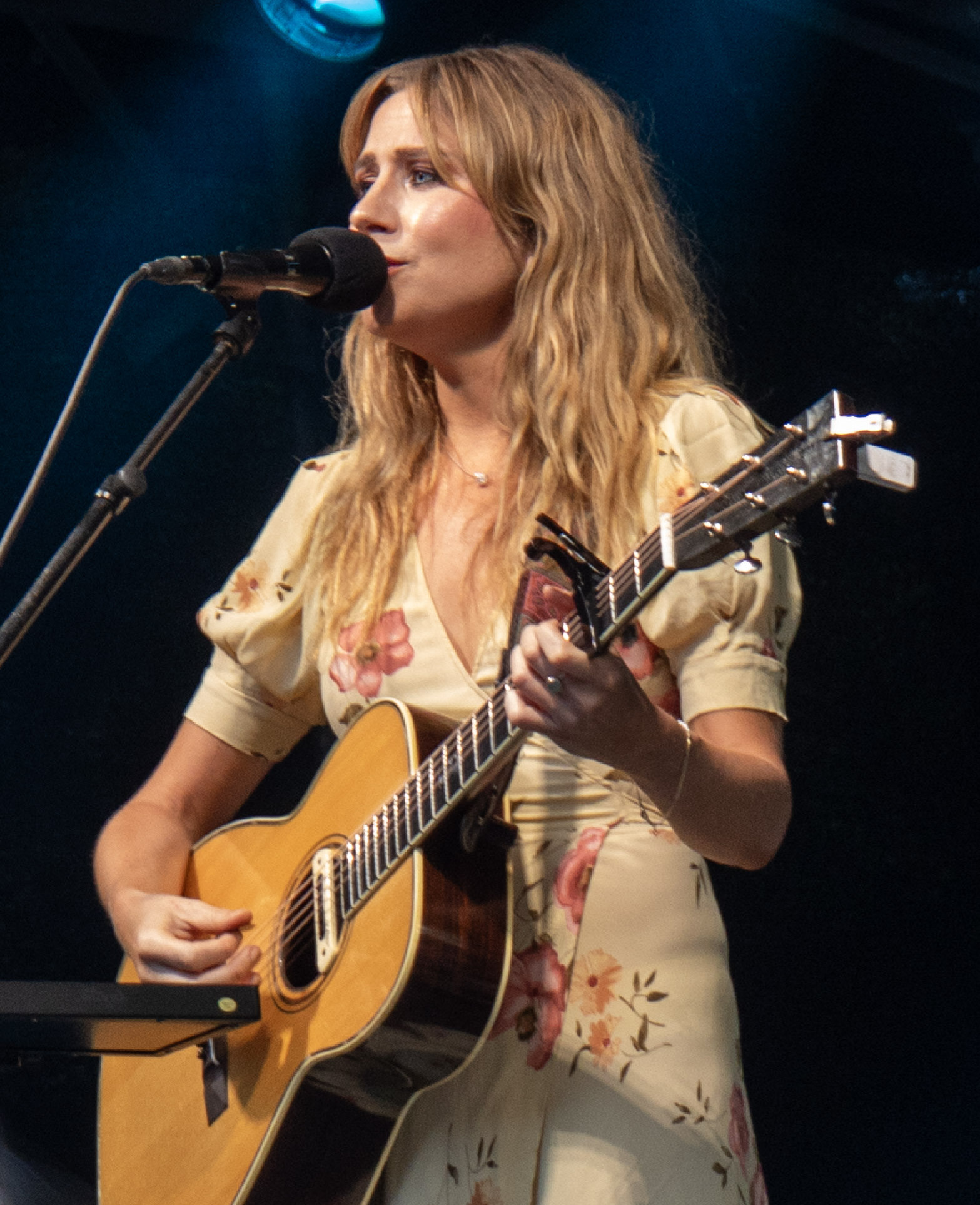
- Bratland in 2025

Background information
- Born: Ingebjørg Harman Bratland; 8 May 1990 (age 36); Vinje Municipality, Telemark
- Origin: Norway
- Genres: Folk, kveder, composer
- Occupation: Singer
- Website: ingebjorgbratland.no

Ingebjørg Harman Bratland (born 8 May 1990 in Edland, Vinje Municipality, Telemark) is a Norwegian folk singer, kveder and artist. Throughout her career, Bratland has been the recipient of numerous awards and is known for her emotive performances that blend traditional Norwegian folk music with contemporary elements.

== Early life ==
Bratland began singing as a kveder when she was five years old, and was notable for her ability to perform folk songs, stev and ballads. She started taking singing lessons at an early age, primarily from Ellen Nordstoga. In 2004, at age 14, she received the 'Eckbo legaters folkemusikkpris'. As a kveder, Bratland won the C-class at Landskappleiken traditional music competition four times. In 2008–2009, she attended Foss Upper Secondary School in Oslo. In 2009, she won the vocal class A during the Norwegian championship in traditional folk music at Geilo. She is the Nordic Champion in traditional folk music and, in 2009, received the Vinje Municipality Culture Scholarship. In 2010, Bratland was awarded the Fureprisen, which included NKR 50 000.

== Career ==
Bratland performed the title track of the children series Jul i svingen on NRK1. The series' music was written by Odd Nordstoga and was awarded the 2006 Spellemannprisen in the category Best music album for children. Bratland and Odd Nordstoga give a duet on the tune "Julevise". She contributed the song "Mitt hjerte alltid vanker" on H. K. H. Kronprinsesse Mette-Marits Sorgen Og Gleden and participated in other concerts and performances, including Den fyste song for H. M. Kong Harald in connection with his 70th birthday (2007). She participated in television broadcasts Kjempesjansen and Beat for Beat at NRK1, and Det store korslaget at TV2 Norway. She performed Nordahl Grieg's "Til Ungdommen" a cappella at the memorial concert in Oslo Cathedral 30 July 2011.

In 2013, Bratland released the album Heimafrå together with Odd Nordstoga. She was awarded the 2013 Spellemannprisen in the category "traditional folk music" for this album. She was nominated for the 2014 Spellemannprisen in the category "folk music" for her first solo album Berre Meg. Her second solo album, Månesinn, was released in 2015. The album contains tunes Bratland wrote herself, with the producers Espen Lind and Geir Hvidsten. Following her performance at the 2016 Spellemannsprisen, a remix of the single "Stjernene" with the rapper Lars Vaular as guest artist was released.

In 2017, Bratland won the Hilmar Prize, a folk music prize awarded by Steinkjer Municipality and Nord-Trøndelag County Council in memory of Hilmar Alexandersen. In January 2018, she was awarded the Wenche Foss Honorary Prize. She shared the prize with the Norwegian Foster Home Association.

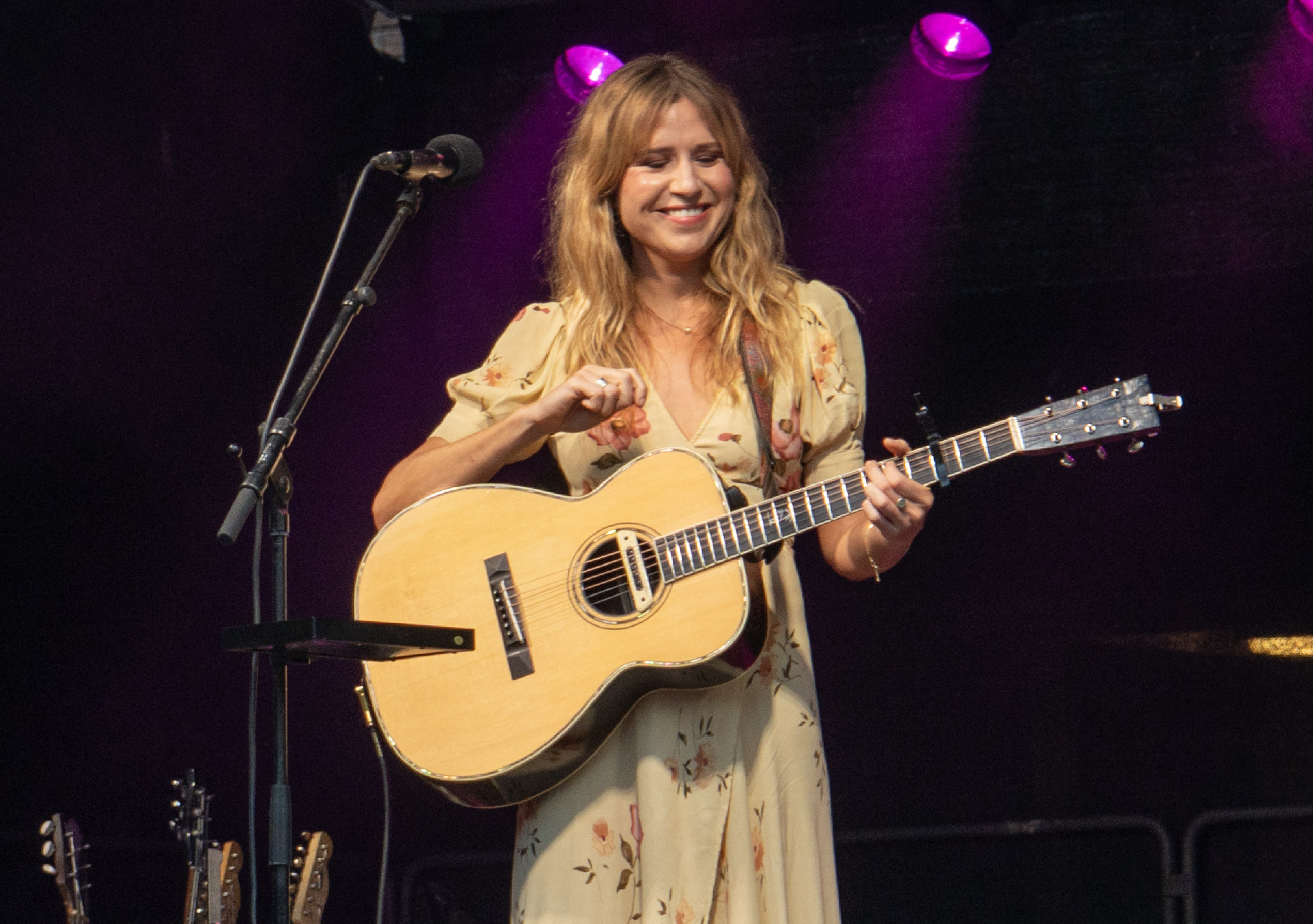
Bratland performing in 2025

In 2023, Bratland and Odd Nordstoga released their second album, Langt heimafrå. After the release, they received the Dialektprisen together for the use of Nynorsk and dialects in the lyrics. For the album, they were nominated for the Spellemannprisen 2023 in the show and show pop category.

In 2026, Bratland debuted as a coach on the eleventh season of The Voice – Norges beste stemme, alongside Espen Lind, Marion Raven, and Jarle Bernhoft. Bratland was the winning coach of the season, mentoring her artist Eskil Fossum Vik to victory. She also has the distinction of being the second coach in the entire The Voice franchise to have every artist in the final of the show on their team.

== Discography ==
=== Solo albums ===
- 2014: Berre Meg (Universal)
- 2015: Månesinn (Universal)
- 2017: Bror
- 2020: Papirfly
- 2020: Klokkene kaller (Universal)

=== Collaborations ===
- 2013: Heimafrå (Universal), with Odd Nordstoga
- 2019: Til alle tider (Universal), with Espen Lind
- 2023: Langt heimafrå (Universal), with Odd Nordstoga
- 2023: Live i marka (Universal), with KORK
