= Odd Einar Nordheim =

Norwegian musician and singer (born 1972)

Odd Einar Nordheim (born February 5, 1972, in Årdal Municipality) is a Norwegian musician and singer. He won the music talent competition Stjerner i sikte in 1996. He has released two albums under the name "OdD", Mind Your Head in 2001 and Not All Birds Fly with Ease in 2005. He was nominated for best pop solo performer under Spellemannprisen 2001.

His musical inspirations are Otis Redding, Billie Holiday, Prince, Jimi Hendrix, The Police, Tom Waits and Joni Mitchell. Nordheim participated in The Voice – Norges beste stemme in 2012. His mentor in the program was Madcon's Yosef Wolde-Mariam. By the end of August 2020, he was a contestant in NRK's 9th season of Stjernekamp. In the 6th episode he went out of the song competition.

Nordheim is currently living in Siggerud. He is married to Frid Nordheim whom he also competed with in Stjerner i sikte and later in The Voice - Norges beste stemme. In November 2020 he released his first studio album in 15 years, written and performed in his native dialect Sognemål.

== Discography ==
- 2001 – Mind Your Head
- 2005 – Not All Birds Fly with Ease
- 2020 – Mi Sognbok
