= The Voice – Norges beste stemme =

Norwegian reality singing competition

- Created by: John de Mol Jr. Roel van Velzen
- Presented by: Øyvind Mund; Siri N. Avlesen-Østli
- Judges: Current coaches Espen Lind (2–3, 6–); Jarle Bernhoft (8–9, 11–); Ingebjørg Bratland (11–); Marion Raven (11–); Former coaches Yosef Wolde-Mariam (1, 3–10); Eva Weel Skram (10); Gabrielle Leithaug (10); Ina Wroldsen (6–9); Matoma (6–7); Lene Marlin (4–5); Martin Danielle (4–5); Morten Harket (4–5); Sondre Lerche (1–3); Hanne Sørvaag (1, 3); Lene Nystrøm (2); Tommy Tee (2); Magne Furuholmen (1)
- Country of origin: Norway
- Original language: Norwegian
- No. of seasons: 11

Production
- Producers: Talpa Media Group (2012-2019); ITV Studios Norway (2021-present)
- Production location: Oslo

Original release
- Network: TV2
- Release: 27 January 2012 – present

The Voice – Norges beste stemme (Norwegian for The Voice – Norway's best Voice) is a Norwegian reality singing competition and local version of The Voice first broadcast as The Voice of Holland. It started on 27 January 2012 and the final aired on 25 May 2012 on TV2.

One of the important premises of the show is the quality of the singing talent. Four coaches, themselves popular performing artists, train the talents in their group and occasionally perform with them. Talents are selected in blind auditions, where the coaches cannot see, but only hear the auditioner.

== Format ==
The series consists of three phases: a blind audition, a battle phase, and live performance shows. Four judges/coaches, all noteworthy recording artists, choose teams of contestants through a blind audition process. Each judge has the length of the auditioner's performance (about two minutes) to decide if he or she wants that singer on his or her team; if two or more judges want the same singer (as happens frequently), the singer has the final choice of coach.

Each team of singers is mentored and developed by its respective coach. In the second stage, called the battle phase, coaches have two of their team members battle against each other directly by singing the same song together, with the coach choosing which team member to advance from each of four individual "battles" into the first live round. Within that first live round, the surviving four acts from each team again compete head-to-head, with public votes determining one of two acts from each team that will advance to the final eight, while the coach chooses which of the remaining three acts comprises the other performer remaining on the team.

In the final phase, the remaining contestants (Final 24) compete against each other in live broadcasts. The television audience and the coaches have equal say 50/50 in deciding who moves on to the final-4 phase. With one team member remaining for each coach, the final four contestants compete against each other in the finale with the outcome decided solely by public vote.

== Coaches ==
=== Coaching panel ===
Current coaches

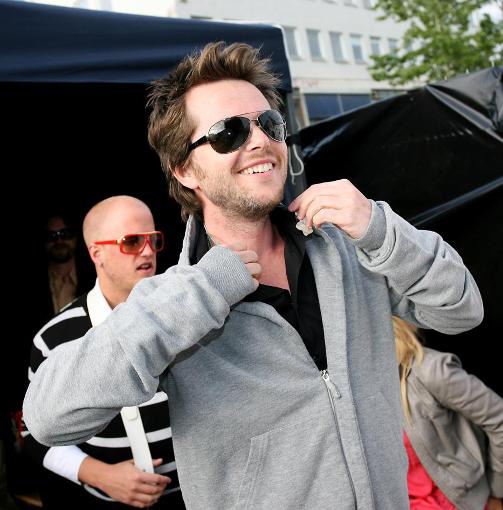
Espen Lind (2013–2015, 2021–)

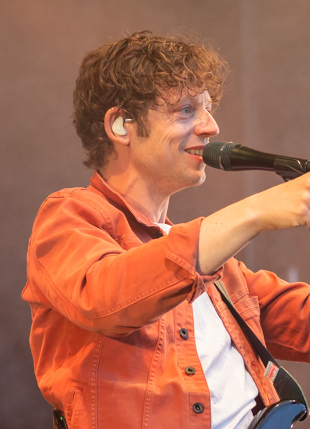
Jarle Bernhoft (2023–2024, 2026–)

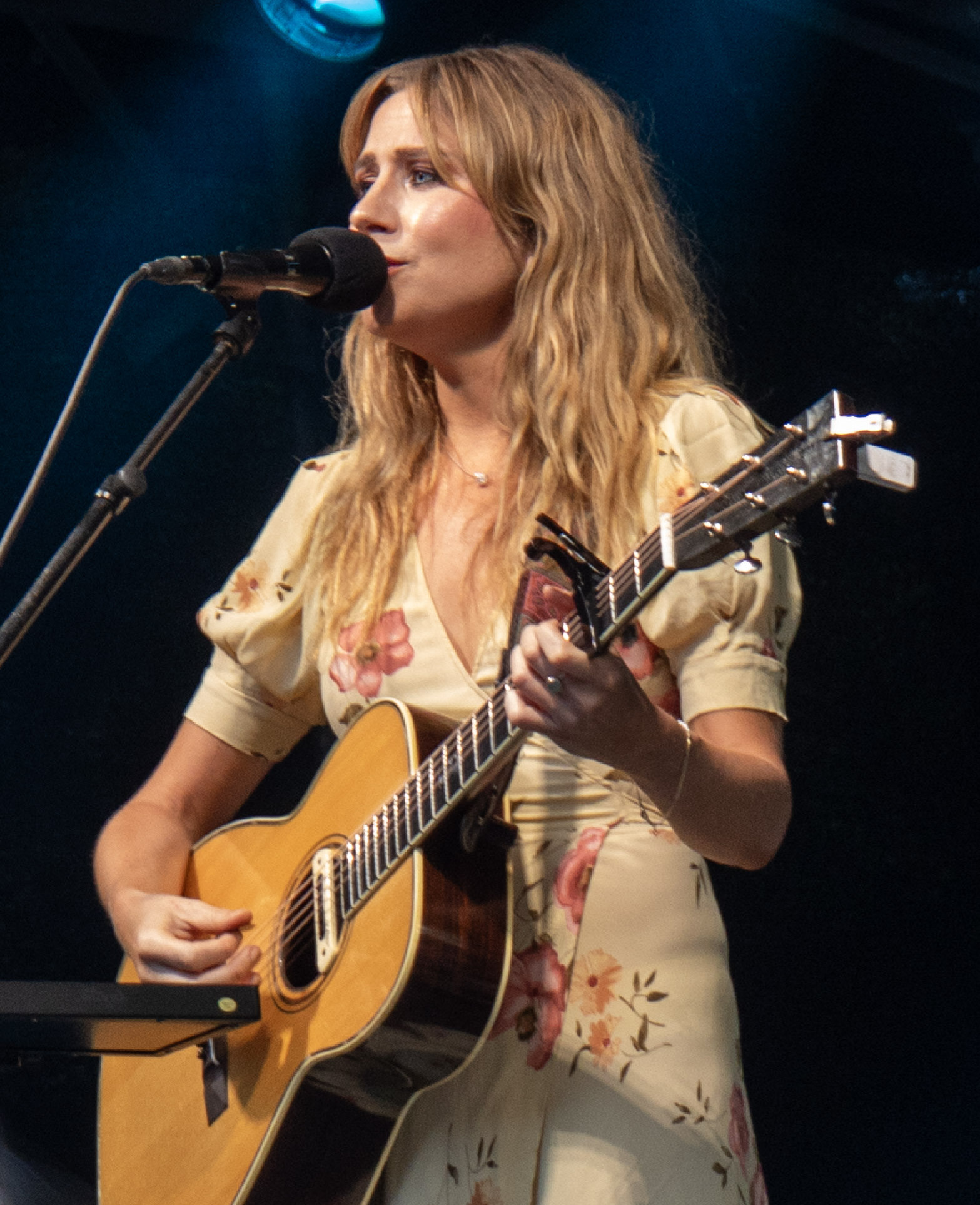
Ingebjørg Bratland (2026–)

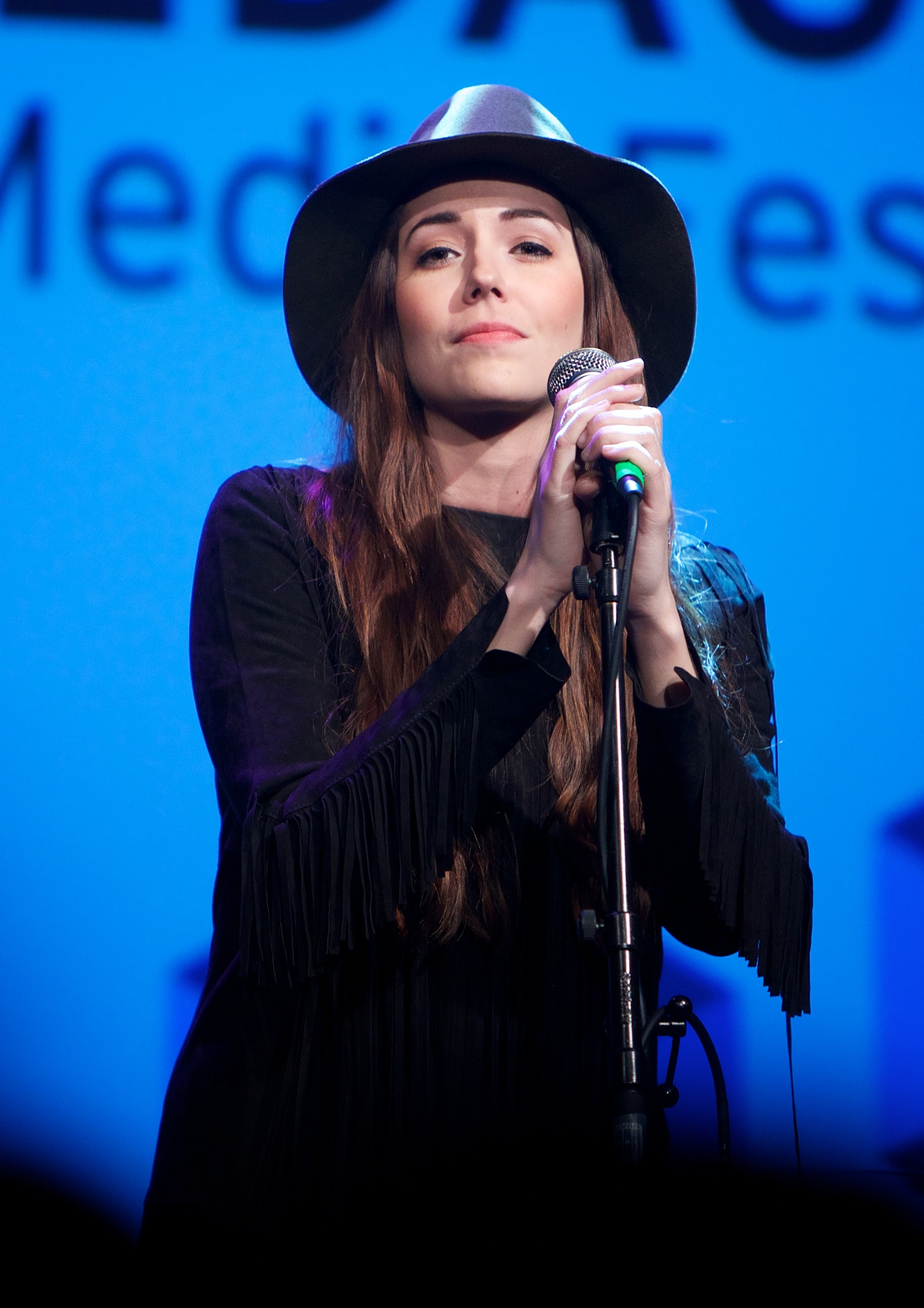
Marion Raven (2026–)
Former coaches

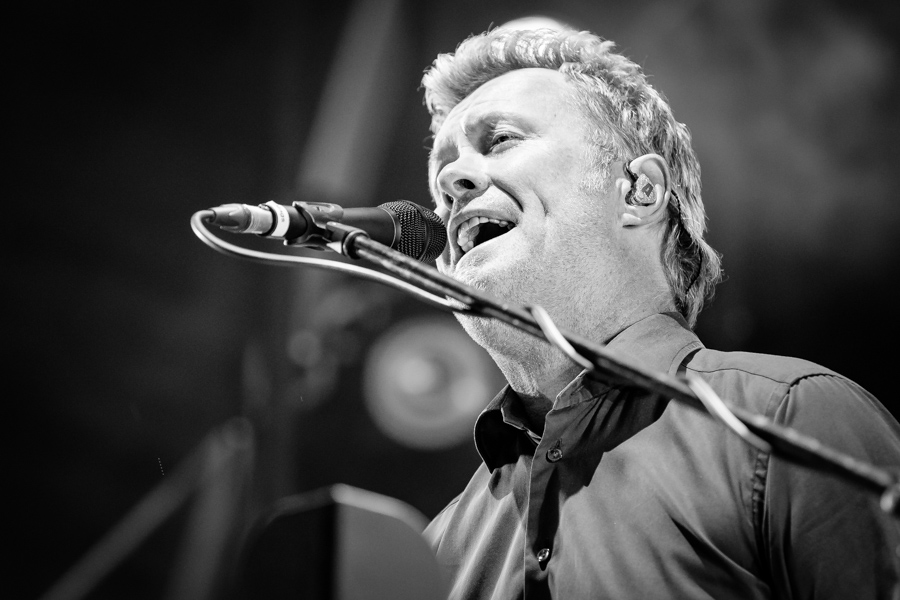
Magne Furuholmen (2012)

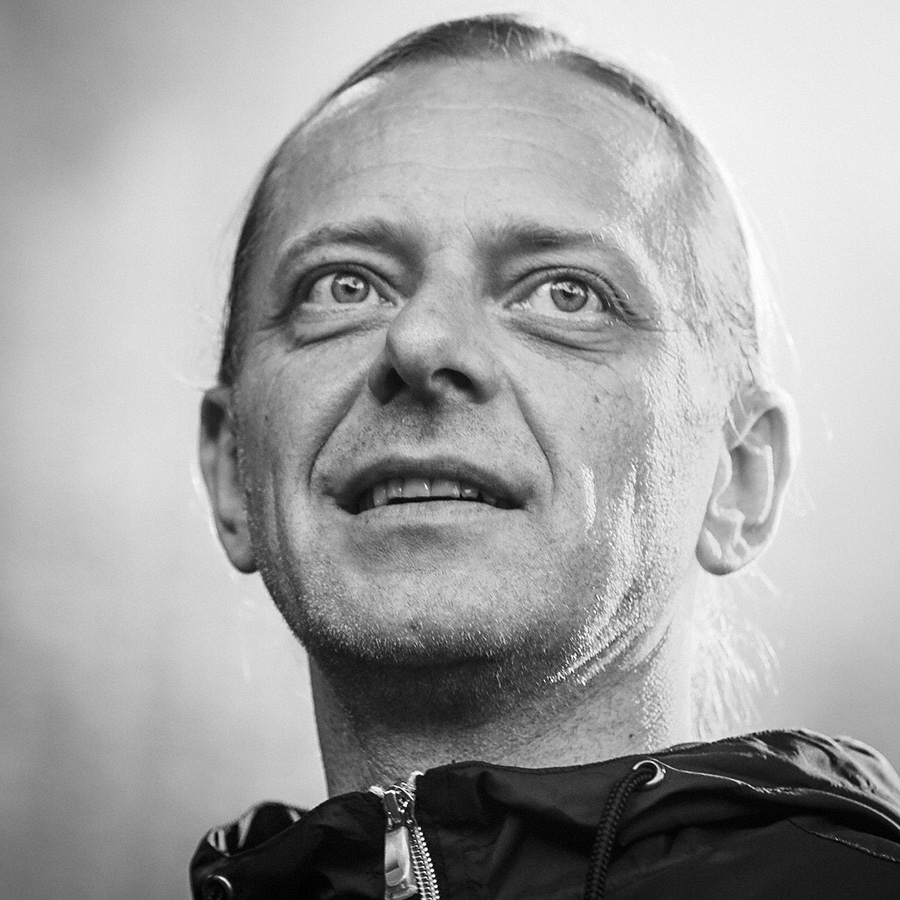
Tommy Tee (2013)

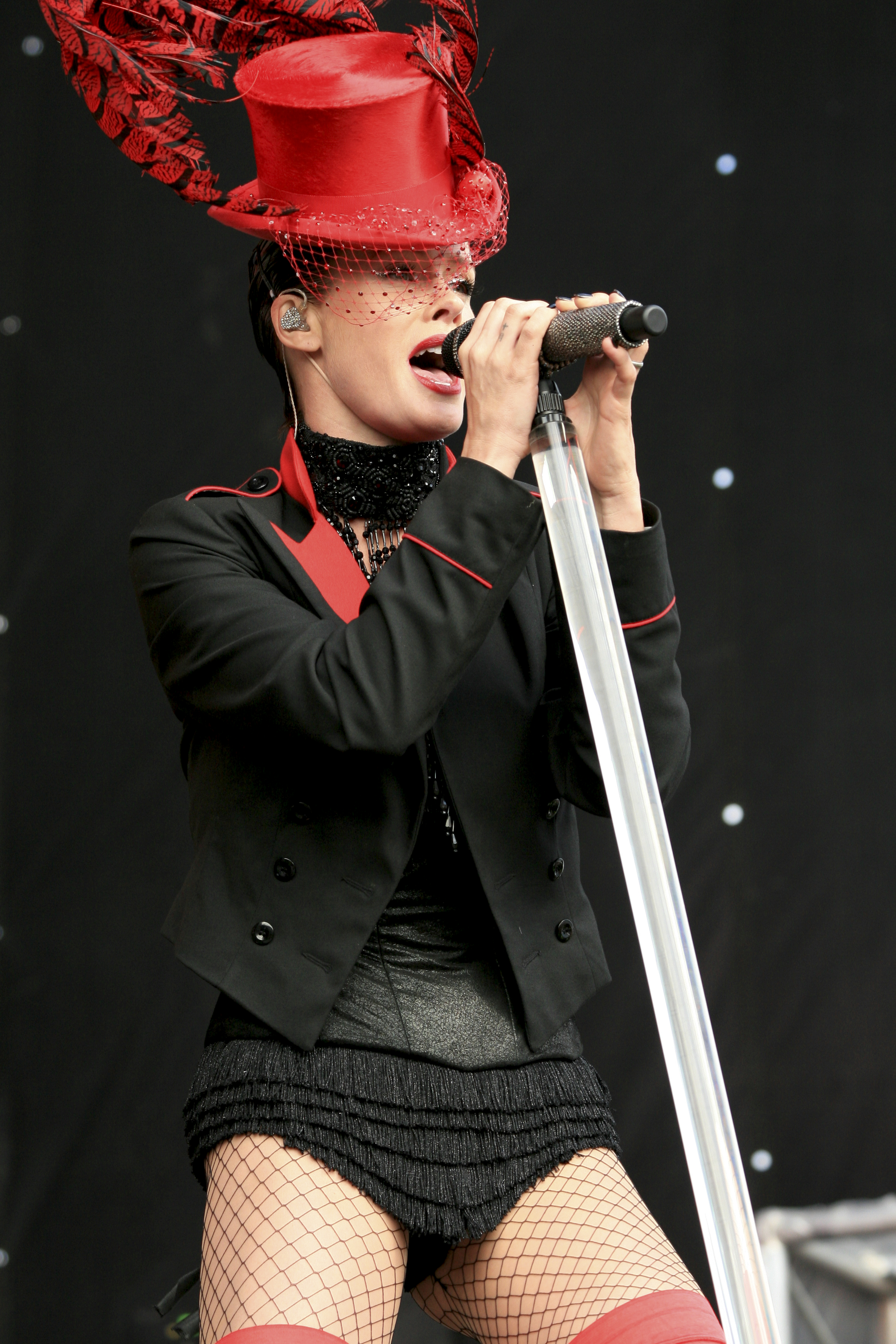
Lene Nystrøm (2013)

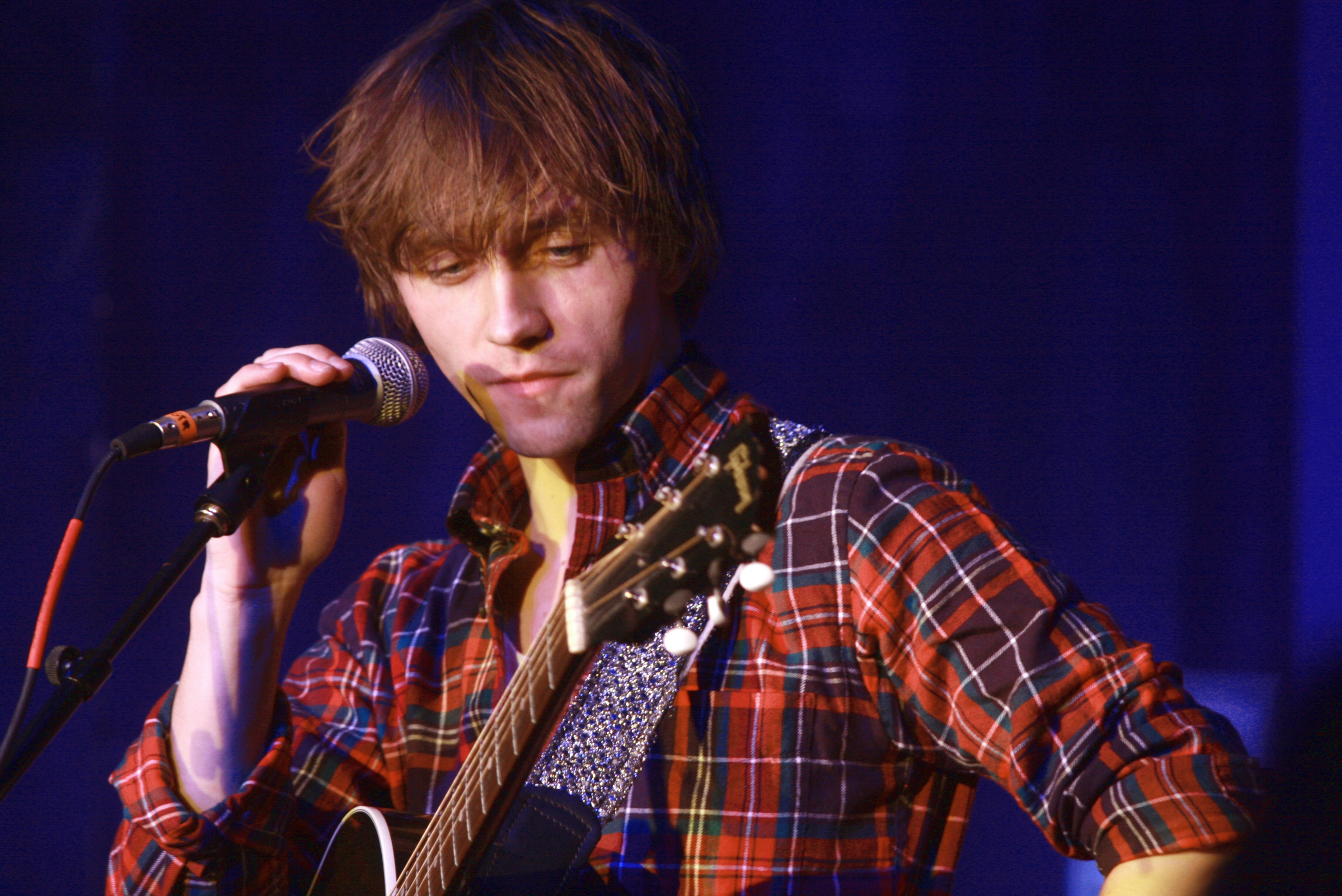
Sondre Lerche (2012–2015)

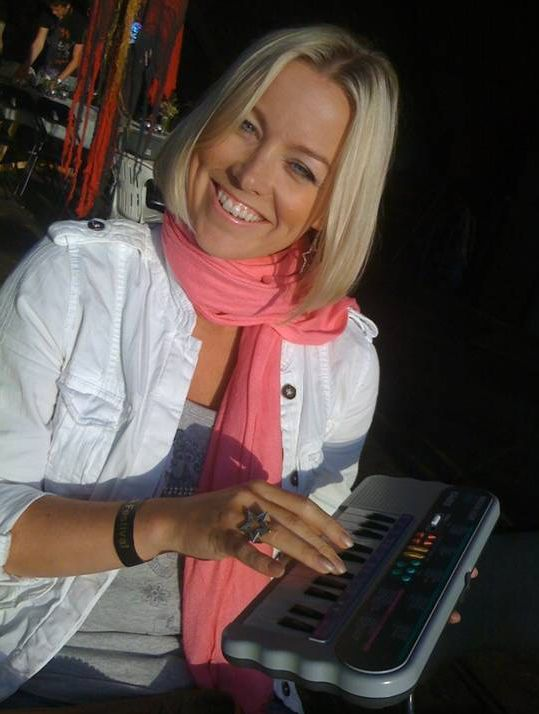
Hanne Sørvaag (2012, 2015)

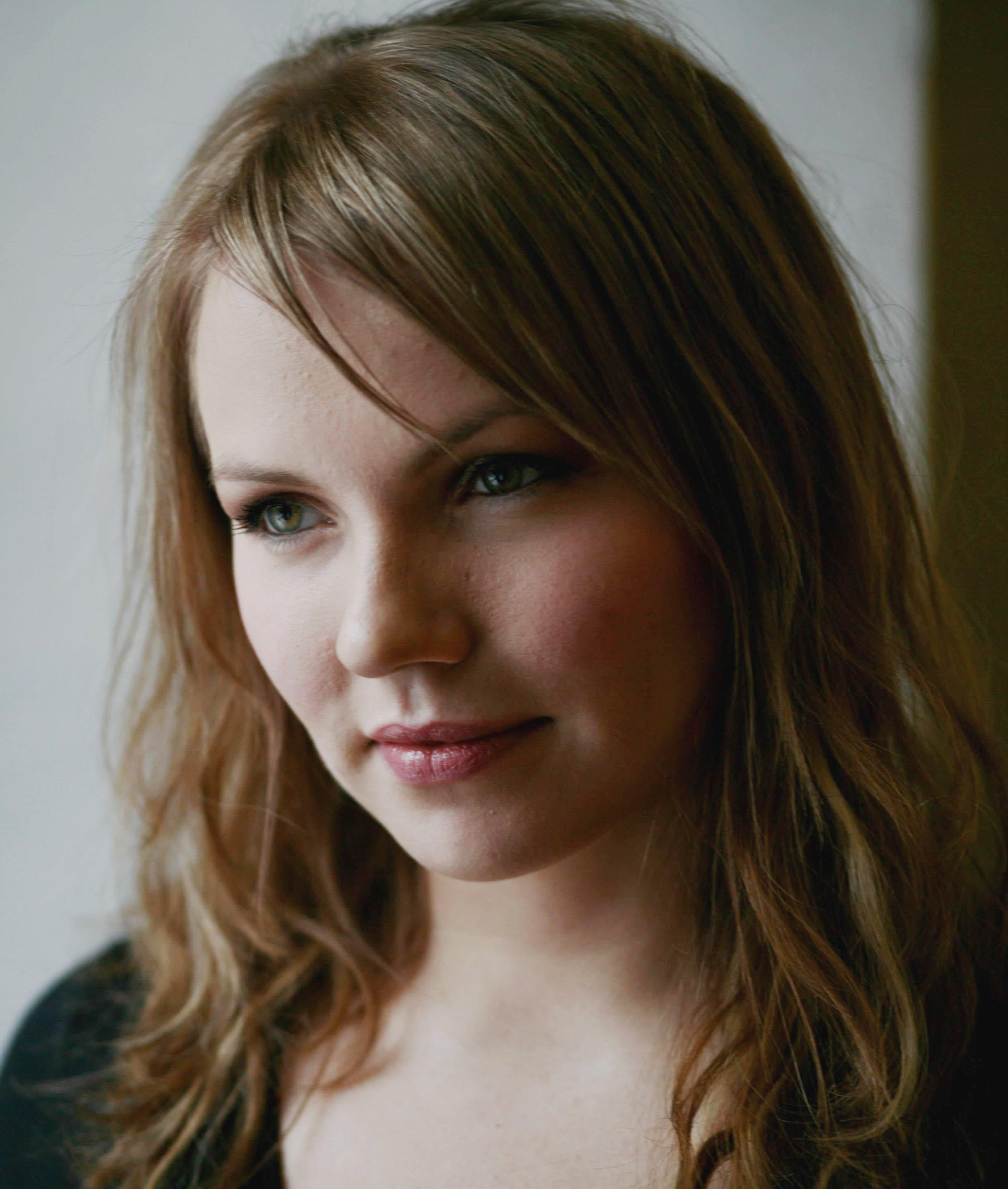
Lene Marlin (2017–2019)

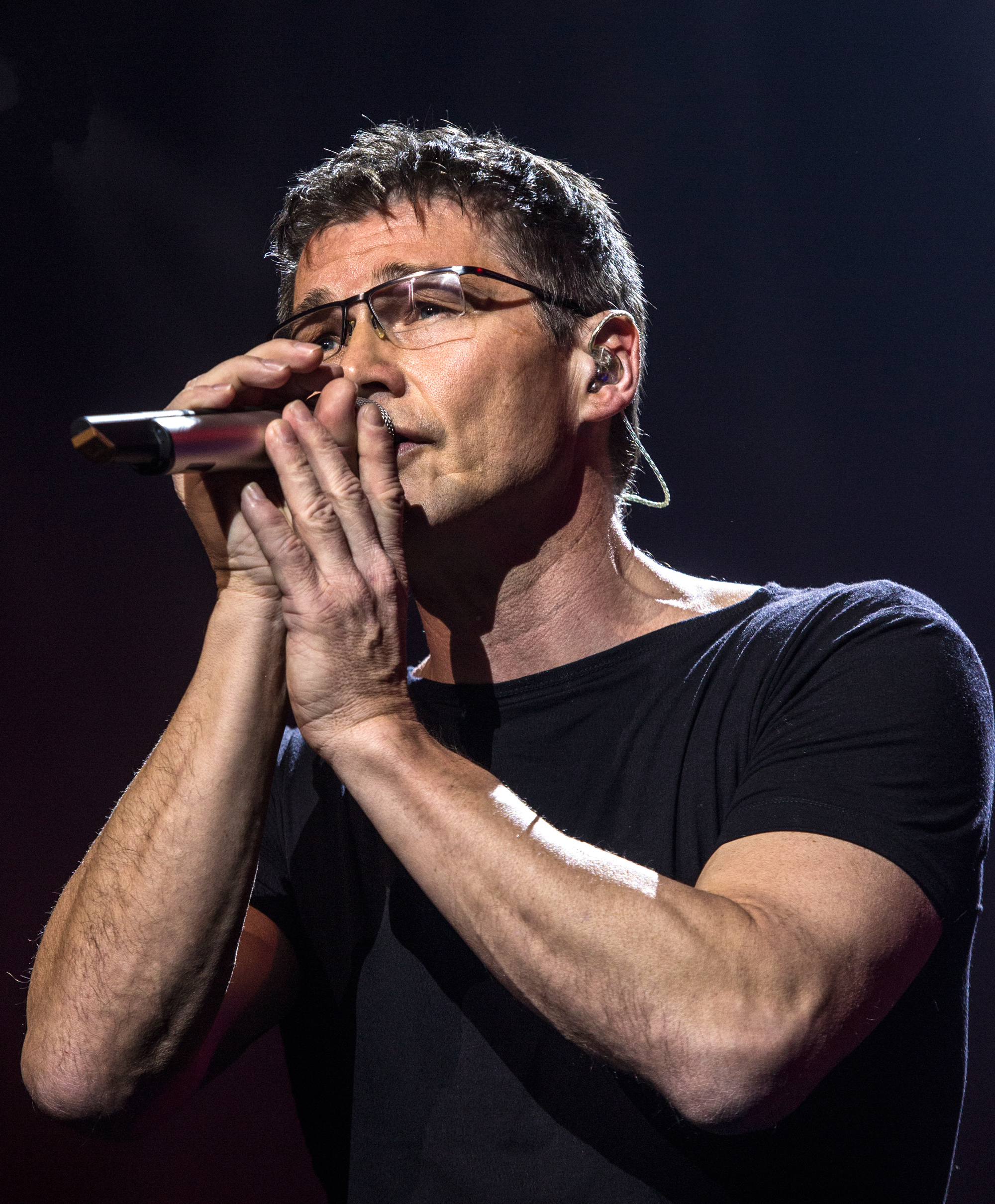
Morten Harket (2017–2019)

Martin Danielle (2017–2019)

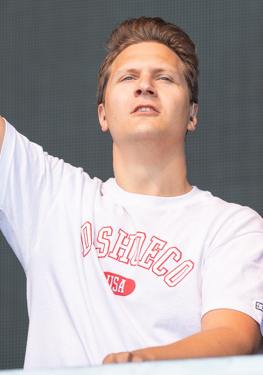
Matoma (2021–2022)

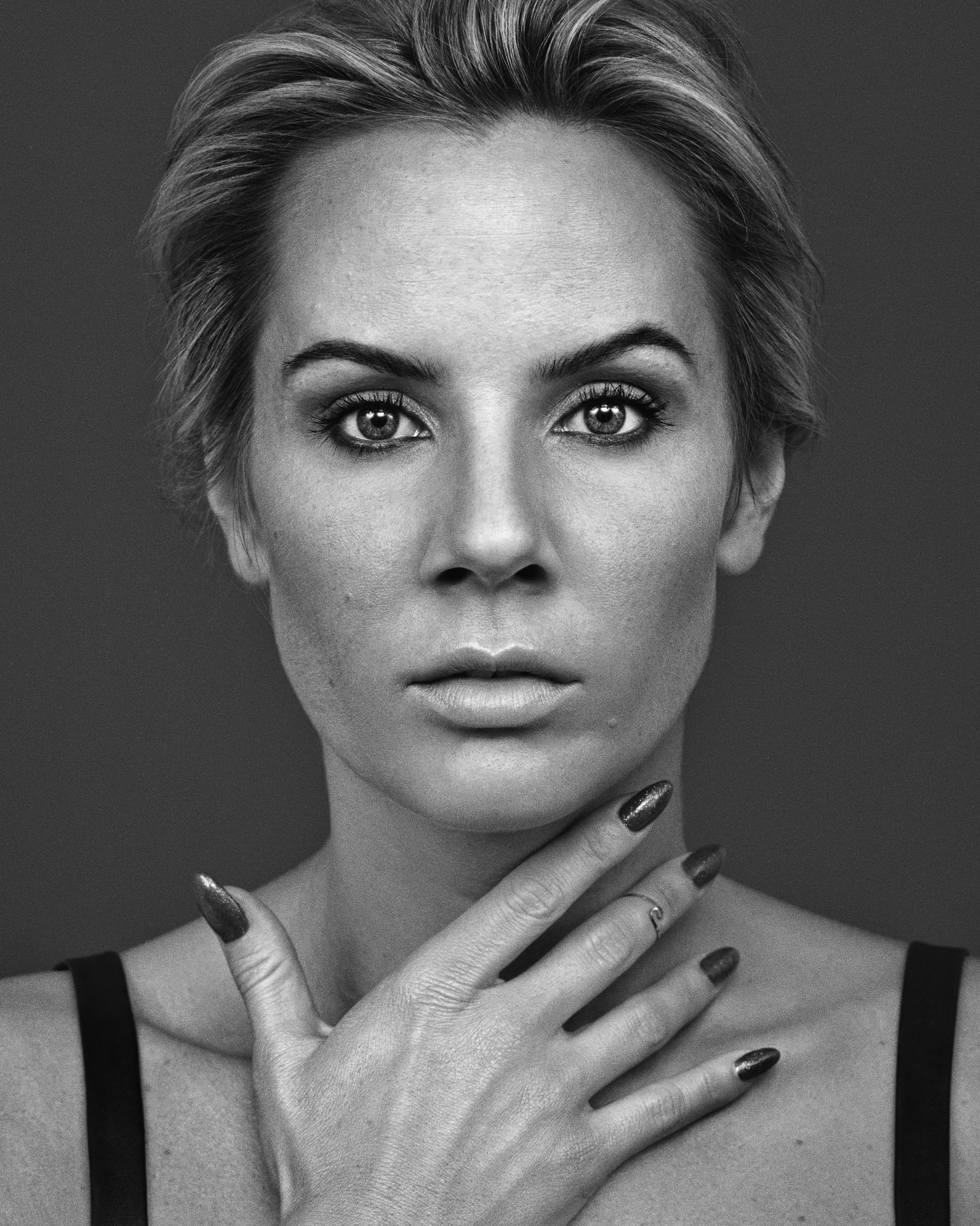
Ina Wroldsen (2021–2024)

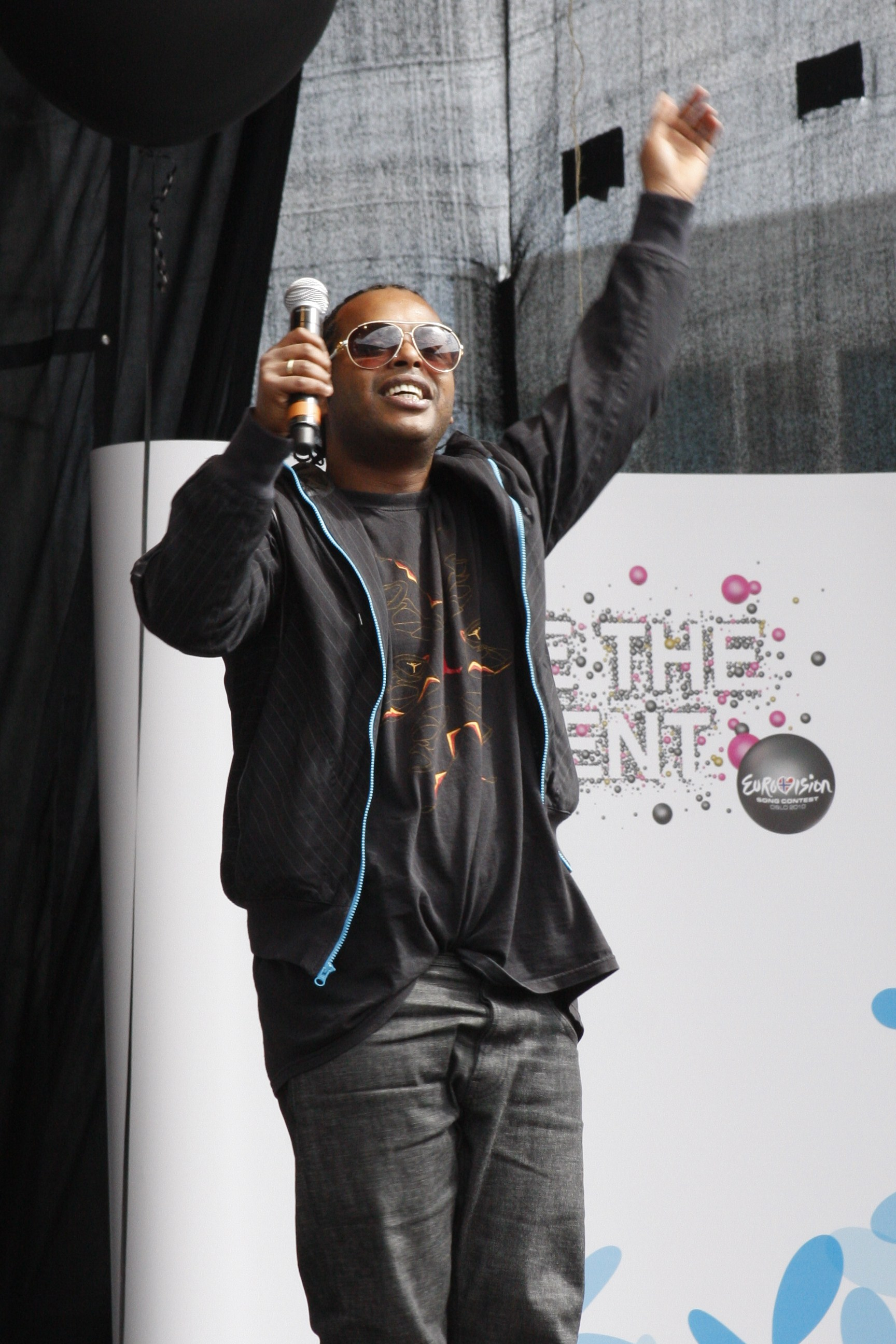
Yosef Wolde-Mariam (2012, 2015–2025)

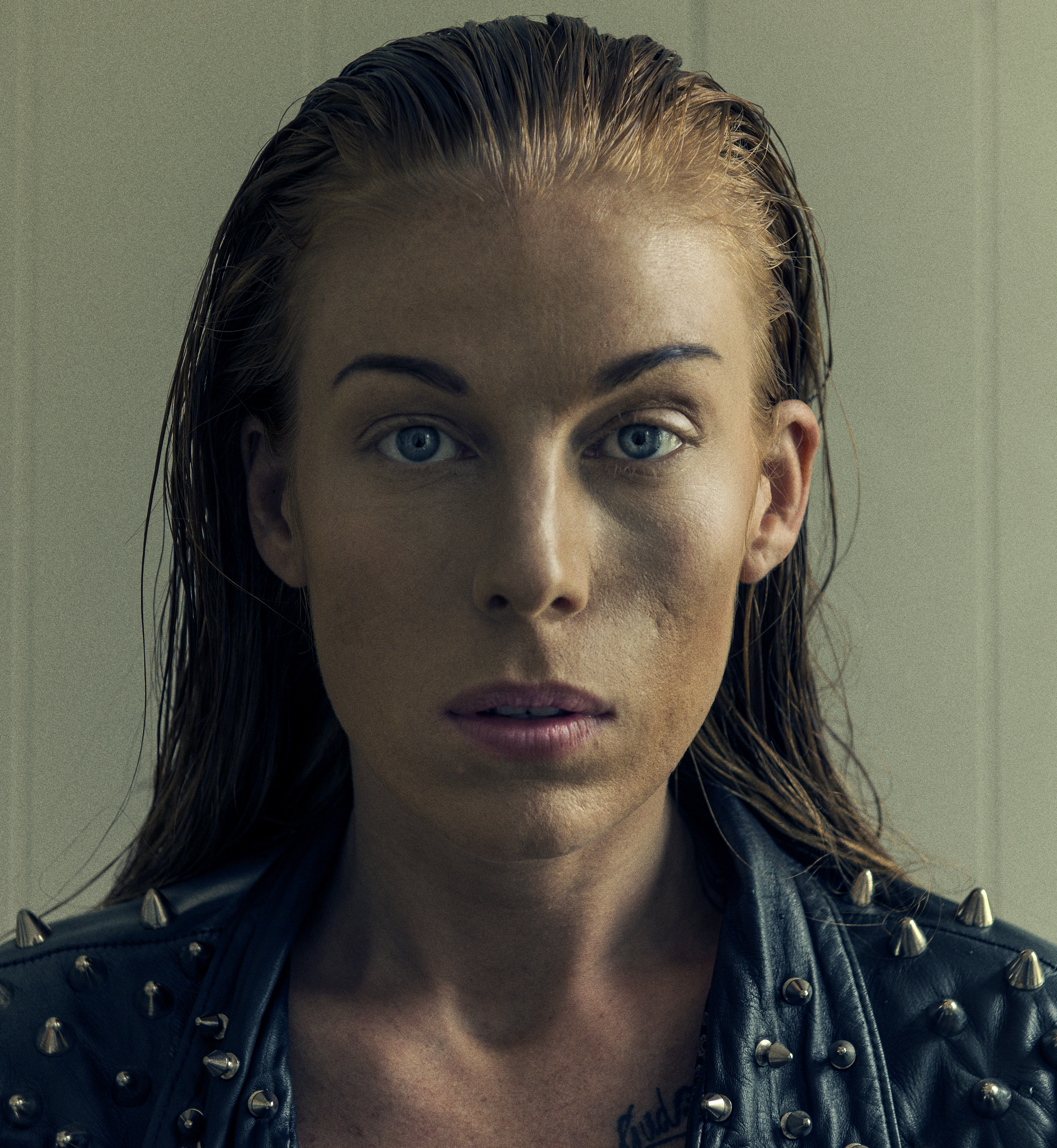
Gabrielle Leithaug (2025)

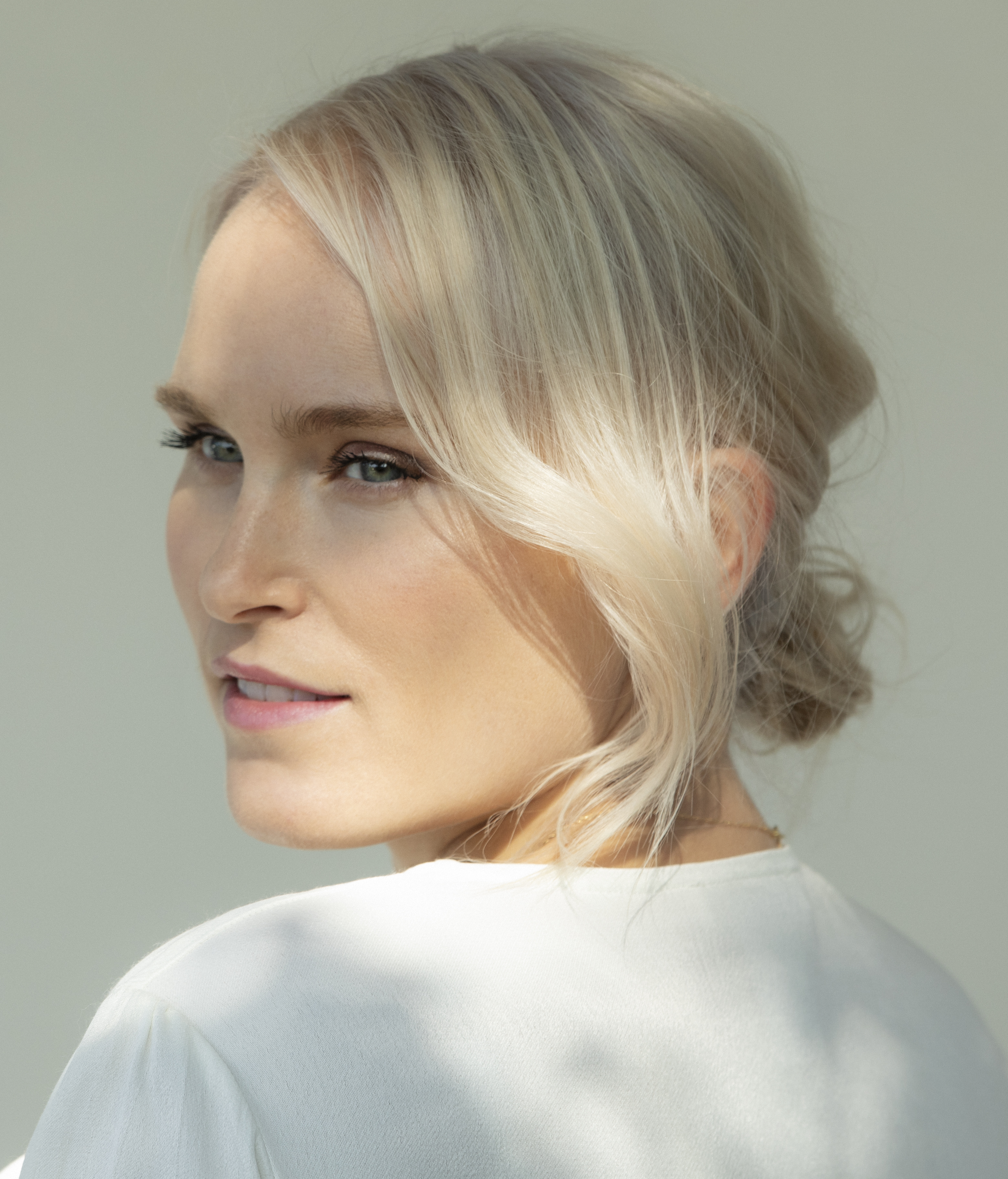
Eva Weel Skram (2025)

=== Coaches' timeline ===
Coaches	Seasons										
Coaches	1	2	3	4	5	6	7	8	9	10	11
Sondre Lerche											
Yosef Wolde-Mariam											
Hanne Sørvaag											
Magne Furuholmen											
Espen Lind											
Lene Nystrøm											
Tommy Tee											
Lene Marlin											
Morten Harket											
Martin Danielle											
Ina Wroldsen											
Matoma											
Jarle Bernhoft											
Gabrielle Leithaug											
Eva Weel Skram											
Ingebjørg Bratland											
Marion Raven											

=== Line-up of coaches ===
Coaches' line-up by chairs order
Season	Year	Coaches			
Season	Year	1	2	3	4
1	2012	Sondre	Hanne	Yosef	Magne
2	2013	Sondre	Tommy	Lene	Espen
3	2015	Espen	Yosef	Hanne	Sondre
4	2017	Yosef	Lene	Martin	Morten
5	2019	Morten	Yosef	Lene	Martin
6	2021	Matoma	Espen	Ina	Yosef
7	2022	Espen	Yosef	Ina	Matoma
8	2023	Espen	Ina	Yosef	Jarle
9	2024	Jarle	Espen	Ina	Yosef
10	2025	Yosef	Gabrielle	Eva	Espen
11	2026	Ingebjørg	Espen	Marion	Jarle

== Series overview ==
Warning: the following table presents a significant number of different colors.

Teams color key
Artist from Team Magne	Artist from Team Tommy	Artist from Team Ina
Artist from Team Yosef	Artist from Team Espen	Artist from Team Jarle
Artist from Team Sondre	Artist from Team Lene M.	Artist from Team Gabrielle
Artist from Team Hanne	Artist from Team Morten	Artist from Team Ingebjørg
Artist from Team Lene N.	Artist from Team Matoma

The Voice – Norges beste stemme series overview
Season	Aired	Winner	Runner Up	Third Place	Fourth Place	Winning Coach	Host
1	2012	Martin Halla	Odd Einar Nordheim	Aleksander Walmann	Hege Øversveen	Magne Furuholmen	Øyvind Mund
2	2013	Knut Marius	Adrian Jørgensen	Tor Kvammen	Pål Rake	Lene Nystrøm	Øyvind Mund
3	2015	Yvonne Nordvik	Filip Bernard	Nicoline Berg	Øyvind Boye	Espen Lind	Øyvind Mund
4	2017	Thomas Løseth	Andrea Santiago	Sebastian James	Agnes Stock	Lene Marlin	Øyvind Mund
5	2019	Maria Engås Halsne	Edward Mustad	Oskar Øiestad	Steffi Buie	Morten Harket	Øyvind Mund
6	2021	Erlend Gunstveit	Maria Petra Brandal	Sofie Fjellvang	Natan Dagur	Matoma	Øyvind Mund
7	2022	Jørgen Dahl Moe	Tara Bloch-Vere	André Askeland Hagen	Niklas Jung Hansen	Ina Wroldsen	Siri N. Avlesen-Østli
8	2023	Kira Dalan-Eriksen	Thomas Tvedt	Isak Øvrevold	Fredrik Amadeus	Espen Lind	Siri N. Avlesen-Østli
9	2024	Inger Lise Hope	Lavrans Svendsen	Arthur Stulien	Nola Kvarme	Espen Lind	Siri N. Avlesen-Østli
10	2025	Andrea Bredesen Holm	Olivia G. Husabø	Herman Lie	—N/a	Yosef Wolde-Mariam	Siri N. Avlesen-Østli
11	2026	Eskil Fossum Vik	André Hustoft Nesheim	Nora Banne	—N/a	Ingebjørg Bratland	Siri N. Avlesen-Østli

== Seasons' synopsis ==
=== Season 1 (2012) ===
The coaches for the debut seasons are singer/songwriter Sondre Lerche, pop star Hanne Sørvaag, Madcon member Yosef Wolde-Mariam and former A-ha member Magne Furuholmen. Øyvind Mund is hosting the programme while Maria Bodøgaard shares hosting duties as the social media correspondent. Martin Halla from Team Magne Furuholmen won the competition.

==== Finalists ====
Winning coach/contestant. Winner in bold, eliminated contestants in small font.
Runner-up coach/contestant. Final contestant first listed.
Third place coach/contestant. Final contestant first listed.
Fourth place coach/contestant. Final contestant first listed.

Coaches
Sondre Lerche	Hanne Sørvaag	Yosef Wolde-Mariam	Magne Furuholmen
Aleksander Walmann; Inge Andreas Jacobsen; Ida Hanevold; Eli van der Eynden; Hans Petter Hammersmack	Hege Øversveen; Frid Nordheim; Ole-Alexander Mæland; Suzana Costa Johansen; Elisabeth Kristensen	Odd Einar Nordheim; Silje Løvaas; Omar Mohamed Ahmed; Elisabeth Vatndal; Leif Anders Wentzel	**Martin Halla**; Monika Blomeid; Shaun Bartlett; Marius Beck; Marianne Pentha

=== Season 2 (2013) ===
Due to the success of the inaugural season, a second season was announced for 2013. Sondre Lerche is the only judge returning from the inaugural 2012 season. All other three judges Hanne Sørvaag, Yosef Wolde-Mariam, and Magne Furuholmen were replaced by singer and songwriter Espen Lind, singer and former Aqua member Lene Nystrøm, and rapper and music producer Tommy Tee. Knut Marius from team Lene Nystrøm won the season.

Coaches
Sondre Lerche	Tommy Tee	Lene Nystrøm	Espen Lind
Adrian Jørgensen; Joanna D. Bussinger; Thea Næss; Frida Natland	Tor Kvammen; Sindre Gjærum Hansen; Makeda Dyhre; Caterina Sørløkken	**Knut Marius**; Malin Strandberg; Audun Ransel; Torstein Rolstad	Pål Rake; Kristian Kristensen; Geirmund Hansen; Morten Fredheim

=== Season 3 (2015) ===
The third season premiered in March 2015 with returning coaches Sondre Lerche, Espen Lind as well as Hanne Sørvaag and Yosef Wolde-Mariam who both returned after a one-season hiatus. The hosts remained unchanged. Yvonne Nordvik, mentored by Espen Lind, won the competition.

Coaches
Espen Lind	Yosef Wolde-Mariam	Hanne Sørvaag	Sondre Lerche
**Yvonne Nordvik**; Elisabeth Torstuen; Pal Asdal; Signe Sorli	Filip Bernard; Carina Ister; Marianne Engebretsen; Nina Ugland	Øyvind Boye; Kim Rune Hagen; Karoline Sem Larm; Ulrikke Brandstorp	Nicoline Berg; Amanda Kamara; Kim André Rønningen; Kaja Sogard

=== Season 4 (2017) ===
The fourth season began in August 2017 with returning coach Yosef Wolde-Mariam and three new coaches Lene Marlin, Morten Harket and Martin Danielle. Starting from this season, voting will be individual-based instead of team-based like last seasons. Thomas Løseth from Team Lene won the competition on 9 December 2017. This was the first season where a coach (Danielle) was not represented in the finale and accordingly a coach (Marlin) advanced with two artists into the finale.

Coaches
Yosef Wolde-Mariam	Lene Marlin	Martin Danielle	Morten Harket
Andrea Santiago; August Dahl; Jeremaya John; Kaja Rode; Mirjam Johanne Omdal	**Thomas Løseth**; Agnes Stock; Olaves Fiskum; Lillen Stenberg; Ida Lunde	Elise Nærø; Malin Joneid Ellefsen; Magnus Bokn; Maria Celin Strisland; Karina Pieroth	Sebastian James; Ingeborg Walther; Knut Kippersund; Dina Sæle Ek; Isabelle Bjørneraas

=== Season 5 (2019) ===
The fifth season of the show began in January 2019 with the same panelists as last season. Maria Engås Halsne from Team Morten won the competition on 31 May 2019. This was the first season where only two coaches (Marlin and Harket) were represented in the finale. This was also the first season where the top two finalists represented the same coach (Harket).

Coaches
Morten Harket	Yosef Wolde-Mariam	Lene Marlin	Martin Danielle
**Maria Engås Halsne**; Edward Mustad; Hanna Solemdal; Henrik Fuglem; Sindre Steig	Endre Gryting; Kristoffer Edvardsen; Sebastian Ferraz; Saima Irén Mian; Kristin Husøy	Oskar Øiestad; Steffi Buie; Rebecca Pettersen; Nora Aurdal; Mina Lund	Amanda Rusti; Amalie Hamborgstrøm; Margot Moe; Moira Halaas; Hana Raca

=== Season 6 (2021) ===
The sixth season of the show premiered on 8 January 2021, Yosef Wolde-Mariam was the only coach to return from the previous season, with Espen Lind rejoining after 2 seasons of hiatus, and 2 new coaches Ina Wroldsen and Matoma joining the panel. Erlend Gunstveit, a 1-chair turn from Team Matoma, won the competition on 31 May 2021.

Coaches
Matoma	Espen Lind	Ina Wroldsen	Yosef Wolde-Mariam
**Erlend Gunstveit**; Sondre Bjelland; James Fox; Camilla Sorensen	Maria Petra Brandal; Cynthia Verazie; Charlotte Sofie Holtung; Knut-Sigurd Bygland	Natan Dagur; Sverre Eide; Maria Marzano; Sarah Christine Bøhn	Sofie Fjellvang; Amalie Øvstedal; Byron Williams Jr.; Thea Sofie Vervik Barka

=== Season 7 (2022) ===
The seventh season of the show premiered on 7 January 2022 with the same coaches as last season, Espen Lind, Yosef Wolde-Mariam, Ina Wroldsen and Matoma. This was the third season where a coach (Wroldsen) managed to bring two acts into the finale. Wolde-Mariam was not represented in the finale for the second season, the first being in season 5. Jørgen Dahl Moe from Team Ina won the competition on 27 May 2022. Jørgen was previously the winner of MGPjr with the song "Din egen vei", being one of the Norwegian representatives at MGP Nordic later that year in November.

Coaches
Espen Lind	Yosef Wolde-Mariam	Ina Wroldsen	Matoma
Niklas Jung Hansen; Øyvind Weiseth; Mathilde W. Taugard; Alessandra Mele	Madeleine Tverberg; Sebastian Christensen; Tuva Knutsen; Tine Gajda	**Jørgen Dahl Moe**; André Askeland Hagen; Stian Åkvik; Ulrikke Nilsen	Tara Bloch-Vere; Kristi Lucena; Chris Lund; Ane Marit Hølås

=== Season 8 (2023) ===
The eighth season premiered 6 January 2023 with Espen Lind, Yosef Wolde-Mariam, and Ina Wroldsen returning as coaches. Matoma did not return and was replaced by Jarle Bernhoft. Lind was represented by two acts in the finale, whilst Bernhoft was not represented. Kira Dalan-Eriksen from Team Espen won the competition on 26 May 2023, marking Lind's second win as a coach, being the first to achieve two victories in the Norwegian edition of the franchise.

Coaches
Espen Lind	Ina Wroldsen	Yosef Wolde-Mariam	Jarle Bernhoft
**Kira Dalan Eriksen**; Isak Ovrevold; Dag Erik Osvold; Anne Fagermo	Thomas Tvedt; Kristoffer Sorensen; Leonard Jr. Amorsolo; Henriette Schei	Fredrik Amadeus; Oda Dahl; Kamilla Folsvik Rønnekleiv; Viktoria Birkeli	Ole Henrik Risoy Solheim; Iben Brevik; Marie Meyer; Jenny Z. Haugen

=== Season 9 (2024) ===
The ninth season premiered 5 January 2024 with the same coaches as last season; Jarle Bernhoft, Espen Lind, Yosef Wolde-Mariam, and Ina Wroldsen all returned as coaches. Inger Lise Hope from Team Espen won the competition on 31 May 2024, marking Espen Lind's third win as a coach, becoming the first coach in the Norwegian franchise to win three times, as well as the first coach to win consecutive seasons. Third-placed Arthur Stulien, a 1-chair turn, became the first contestant to be eliminated in the Battle Rounds, before being stolen by Ina Wroldsen, and still reach the final. Season 9 was also the first season the coaches joined their contestants on stage in the final.

- Inger Lise Hope & Espen Lind: Come What May - Nicole Kidman, Ewan McGregor (from Moulin Rouge)
- Lavrans Svendsen & Jarle Bernhoft: Use Somebody - Kings of Leon
- Arthur Stulien & Ina Wroldsen: Ring of Fire - Johnny Cash
- Nola Kvarme & Yosef Wolde-Mariam: Chainsmoking - Jacob Banks

Coaches
Jarle Bernhoft	Espen Lind	Ina Wroldsen	Yosef Wolde-Mariam
Lavrans Svendsen; Tor Vidar Rennestraum; Irina Nordvik; Marita Øvre-Johansen	**Inger Lise Hope**; Lisbeth Fumero; Julian Øines Jørgensen; Herman Randow	Arthur Stulien; Trine Uthaug; Rakel Berntzen; Joakim Boberg	Nola Kvarme; Eirik Zakariassen; Liv-Margethe Muren Ulvund; Adele Erichsen

=== Season 10 (2025) ===
The tenth season premiered 3 January 2025. On 28 June 2024, it was announced that Yosef Wolde-Mariam and Espen Lind will be returning for their ninth and seventh season, while Jarle Bernhoft and Ina Wroldsen were replaced by Eva Weel Skram and Gabrielle Leithaug as first-time coaches. This also marks the first season to feature two female coaches. Andrea Bredesen Holm from Team Yosef won the competition on 23 May 2025, marking Yosef Wolde-Mariam's first win as a coach in nine seasons.

Coaches
Yosef Wolde-Mariam	Gabrielle Leithaug	Eva Weel Skram	Espen Lind
**Andrea Bredesen Holm** Oda Jonetta Joberg Victoria Spandow Mathilde Elisif Høglo	Olivia Gnananantham Husabø Marlen Tjøsvoll Sebby Mikkelsen Ingeborg Ruud	Elida Waage Simone Haaland Maria Bjørkavoll Nora Legrand	Herman Lie Jonas Lovv Hellesøy Karla Nergaard Totland Elisabeth Nygård-Pearson

=== Season 11 (2026) ===
The eleventh season premiered on 9 January 2026. On 15 August 2025, it was announced that only Espen Lind would return as a coach from the previous season, marking his eighth season on the panel. Yosef Wolde-Mariam was replaced by Jarle Bernhoft, who returned for his third season on the panel following a one-season hiatus. In the meantime, Gabrielle Leithaug and Eva Weel Skram were replaced by Ingebjørg Bratland and Marion Raven; both debuted as first-time coaches this season. Eskil Fossum Vik, a 1-chair turn from Team Ingebjørg, won the competition on 29 May 2026, marking Ingebjørg Bratland's first win as a coach. Additionally, Bratland became the first coach in the show's history to have all finalists on their team; this is only the second time across The Voice franchise that such an event occurred, following Gökhan Özoğuz's instance in the third season of O Ses Türkiye.

Coaches
Ingebjørg Bratland	Espen Lind	Marion Raven	Jarle Bernhoft
**Eskil Fossum Vik** André Hustoft Nesheim Nora Banne Sofia Loise Henriksdatter	Leo Blix Trym Bjønnes Magnus Pedersen Peter Estdahl	Birgitte Velsvik Betina Linstad Thea Meyer Maia Milano	Anders Strøm Selma Poole Sara Tveit Mikael Omsland Zakariassen

== See also ==
- The Voice (franchise)
