= Eva & the Heartmaker =

Norwegian musical duo

- Origin: Norway
- Genres: Pop, dance
- Years active: 2006–present
- Members: Eva Weel Skram (vocals); Thomas Stenersen
- Website: www.evaandtheheartmaker.com

Eva Weel Skram
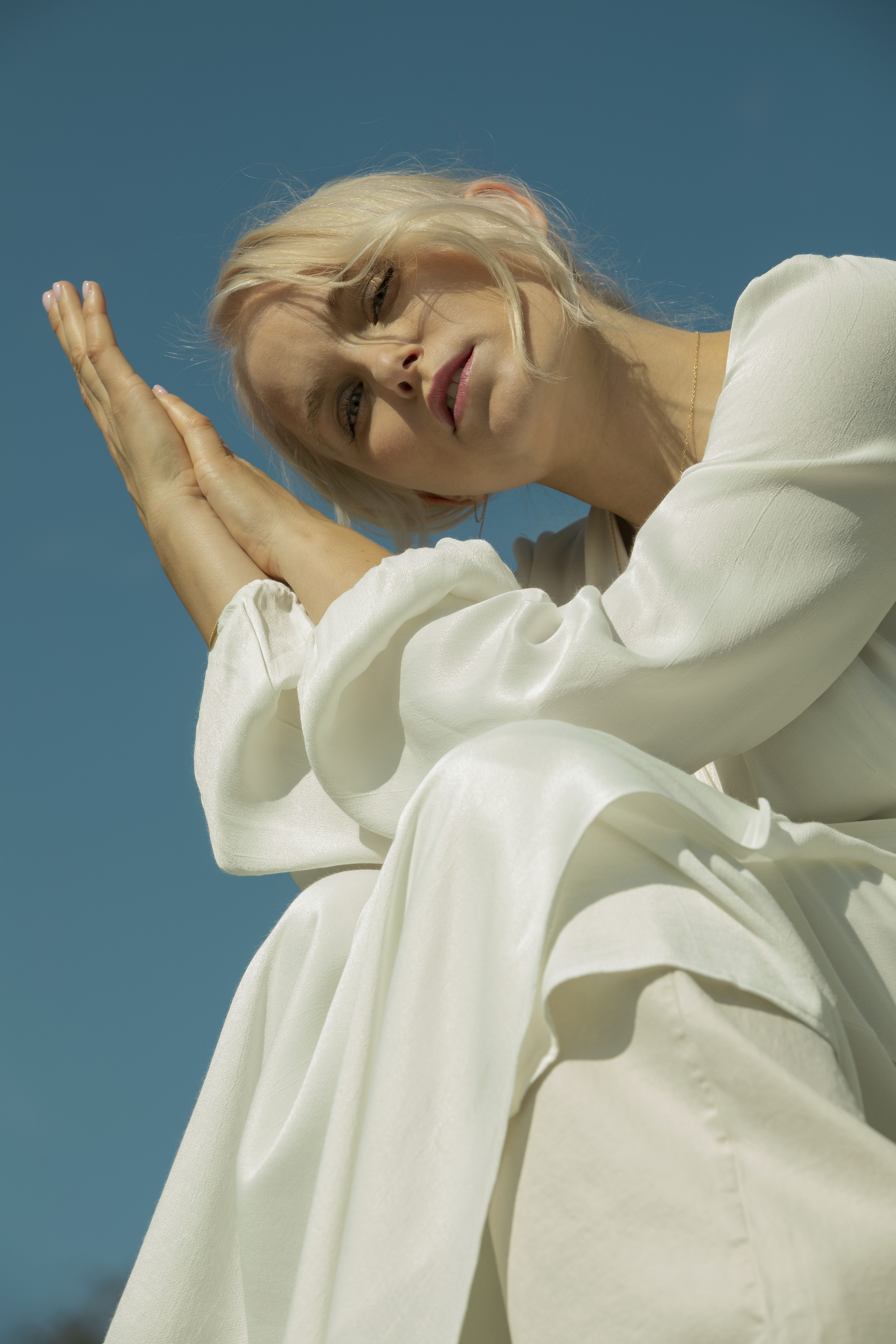
- Skram in August 2019

Background information
- Born: 17 December 1985 (age 40); Sogndal, Norway
- Genres: Pop, dance
- Occupation: Singer
- Instrument: Vocals
- Years active: 2005 – present

Eva & The Heartmaker is a Norwegian musical duo made up of Eva Weel Skram and her husband Thomas Stenersen, with Eva on main vocals. They have released four studio albums and a number of charting singles in the dance genre.

== Eva Weel Skram ==
Eva Weel Skram (born in Sogndal Municipality, Norway on 17 December 1985) studied music, dance and drama Firda Upper Secondary School in Sandane from 2001 to 2004. In 2005, she appeared in season 3 of the Norwegian Idol series. She was eliminated on 22 April 2005 from the competition finishing 6th overall. After Idol she continued her studies for one more year at Romerike Folkehøgskole.

== Duo Eva and the Heartmaker ==
Soon after she formed the duo Eva & The Heartmaker and on 28 August 2006, the duo released their debut album Behind Golden Frames followed in 2009 by Let's Keep This Up Forever that received favorable reviews. "Superhero" taken from the album remains their biggest hit reaching No. 4 on the VG-lista official Norwegian Singles Chart. The duo appeared at the 2010 "Sommerspillet" festival event in Arendal. Their third album Dominoes' was released in 2011 followed by Traces of You has been released in 2013.

Although a duo, in live events they use backup musicians basically made up of Alf Magne Hillestad (drums), Ingar Blix (bass) Lars Kvistum (keyboards) and Anne Marte Nesdal (backing vocals).

== Discography ==
(all credited to Eva & The Heartmaker)

=== Albums ===
Year	Album	Chart peak NOR	Certification
2006	Behind Golden Flames	—	
2009	Let's Keep This Up Forever	13	
2011	Dominoes	15	
2013	Traces of You	7	
2018	Finne heim (as Eva Weel Skram)	2	
2021	Sleppe tak (as Eva Weel Skram)	23	
2024	Vendepunkt (as Eva Weel Skram)	—	

=== Singles ===
Year	Single	Chart peak NOR	Album
2009	"Superhero"	4	Let's Keep This Up Forever
2009	"Please!"	10	Let's Keep This Up Forever
2010	"Mr. Tokyo"	1	Dominoes
2024	"Om du tror på oss" (with Erlend Ropstad)	—	Venderpunkt
2024	"Alt som du vil ha"	—	Venderpunkt
