= Dutty Dior =

Norwegian rapper (1996–2024)

- Born: Kristoffer Åman; 30 November 1996; Oslo, Norway
- Died: 6 April 2024 (aged 27)
- Genre: Hip hop
- Occupations: Rapper; singer; songwriter
- Years active: 2015–2024
- Labels: SDKT Entertainment; Universal Music Group

Kristoffer Castin Åman (born Kristoffer Åman; 30 November 1996 – 6 April 2024), known professionally as Dutty Dior, was a Norwegian rapper, singer and songwriter. During his career he was associated with SDKT Entertainment.

== Early life ==
Åman was born as Kristoffer Eriemo in Oslo on 30 November 1996, where he grew up and later moved to Jessheim. He was born to a Nigerian father and Norwegian mother.

== Career ==
Dior first gained notoriety in 2018 with the single "Plis". In the same year he was featured on Unge Ferrari's album Midt mellom magisk og manisk. Together with Isah, he released the song "Hello" in March 2019, which stayed in the Norwegian charts for a total of 38 weeks and became one of the biggest Norwegian hits of the year. It was named "Song of the Year" at the P3 Gull music awards ceremony and nominated as "Song of the Year" at the Spellemannprisen 2019. He released his debut album BHD, with which he was also able to chart, in October 2019. At the Spellemannprisen 2019 he was also nominated in the newcomer category and in the urban category for his mixtape Para / Normal.

At the Spellemannprisen 2020, Dior received a nomination in the hip-hop category for his Music of the Year 2020. The following year, Åman released the EP Begge to. He released the album Det er mindre ensomt alene in May 2022. In 2023, he entered the Norwegian charts again together with the group Beathoven and the song "Sipper".

== Death ==
Åman died on 6 April 2024, at the age of 27.

== Discography ==
Credits taken from iTunes.

=== Studio albums ===
- BHD (2019)
- Det er mindre ensomt alene (2022)

=== Mixtapes ===
- Para/Normal (2019)
- Kaotisk Eleganse (2020)
- Begge to (with Isah) (2021)

=== Singles ===
- "Plis" (2018)
- "Fantasi" (with Isah) (2018)
- "MA$A" (with ProllyNah & Unge Ferrari) (2018)
- "Hallo" (with Isah) (2019)
- "Moscot & Dior (Remix)" (with Isah & Karpe) (2019)
- "Moshpit" (2020)
- "Komma" (2020)
- "Status" (2020)
- "London" (2020)
- "Null samvittighet" (with Jonas Benyoub) (2021)
- "Hibachi" (2021)
- "V8" (2022)
- "Touch" (with Nils Bech) (2022)
- "Sipper" (with Beathoven) (2023)
- "Hjertesorg betaler regninga" (with Benjie) (2023)
- "BODY" (with ifrapluto) (2023)
- "RINGTONE" (with ifrapluto) (2023)
- "Denial" (with Mabira & Costi Beats) (2024)
