= Sas Plus/Sas Pussy =

EP by Karpe
- Released: February 22, 2019
- Recorded: 2018–2019
- Studios: Basecamp Studios (Stockholm, Sweden); Albatross Recorders (Oslo, Norway); SPACE (Austin, Texas); Ocean Sound Recordings (Ålesund, Norway)
- Genres: Hip hop; alternative R&B; pop
- Length: 29:47
- Labels: Apen og Kjeften; Patel & Abdelmaguid Foundation
- Producers: Aksel "Axxe" Carlson; Thomas Kongshavn

Karpe chronology
Mars (2018)	Sas Plus/Sas Pussy (2019)	Omar Sheriff (2022)

Alternative cover
- Original cover from another perspective.

Sas Plus/Sas Pussy (stylised as SAS PLUS / SAS PUSSY) is the second extended play (EP) by the Norwegian hip hop duo Karpe, composed of rappers Magdi Omar Ytreeide Abdelmaguid and Chirag Rashmikant Patel. It was released on February 22, 2019, through Apen og Kjeften and distributed by Sony Music. The EP follows the duo's fifth studio album Heisann Montebello (2016), and the collaborative EP Mars (2018) with Unge Ferrari and Arif. It features guest vocals from Isah and Emilie Nicolas. Production was handled by Aksel "Axxe" Carlson and Thomas Kongshavn.

Sas Plus/Sas Pussy is a single track with a length of 29 minutes and 47 seconds. Chirag explained the untraditional format as "rap theatre". The idea of making the release one continuous track emerged during the recording process, as they felt that the transitions were related to the lyrics of the next song and theme of the album. The EP is one of the duo's most critically acclaimed release, with a number of music critics pointing out the good production and eccentric lyrics.

Commercially, Sas Plus/Sas Pussy peaked at number three on the VG-lista albums chart in 2019. In 2020 they won a Spellemann in the category Spellemannprisen for Album of the Year, and the EP was nominated in the urban category. Chirag and Magdi were also nominated for the Spellemannprisen for Songwriter of the Year based on their work the record.

== Background ==
The EP was released on February 22, 2019, through Apen og Kjeften and distributed by Sony Music. The release differs from albums that were released earlier by Karpe, as this is one continuous track in 29 minutes and 47 second. Initially, it was not the plan to make their next release one long track. They got the idea halfway through the process when Chirag and Magdi realised that the transitions were related to the lyrics of the next song and the overall theme of the album.

Sas Plus/Sas Pussy differs from the duo's previous projects. The duo used depictions to a further extent in Arabic, Hindi, Gujarati and English mixed with Norwegian to explain their feelings. Chirag and Magdi present a personal side on the EP; contrasting with Heisann Montebello's strong political messages, Sas Plus/Sas Pussy focuses on relationships, love and life.

The EP's title, Sas Plus/Sas Pussy, is a metaphor for striving new comfort in life and uses "SAS Plus" as a dumb expression of the mediocre peak of success achieved as a celebrity in Norway. Chirag describes the metaphor further, stating: "It's not about flying business on Emirates, but maybe a little more about legroom and free coffee". (Note: Original: Det er ikke om å fly førsteklasse på Emirates, men mulig litt mer benplass og gratis kaffe.)

In addition to the length and theme, there is also another essential thing that makes Sas Plus/Sas Pussy different from Karpe's previous releases. The duo has replaced parts of the production site for the first time in a decade, and it was Aksel "Axxe" Carlson and Thomas Kongshavn who have produced the EP. Also, the Norwegian R&B artist Isah was also a big part of the release. The young artist from Stavanger has made a name for himself with the hit single "Hallo" together with Dutty Dior in 2019, and has contributed to Sas Plus/Sas Pussy with both melody lines, vocals, and chorus.

Karpe accuses their old record label Cosmos Music of making incorrect payouts, on the track "§ 393". The name of the track is in reference to a Norwegian law, straffeloven § 393, which regulates "Rough accounting transgression". The record label itself believes the dispute is about producer rights.

== Recording ==
Recording for Sas Plus/Sas Pussy took place between 2018 and 2019, mostly on different hotel rooms in Europe. The work on the EP was not known by the public before Karpe started to post mysterious photos and videos on Instagram. The duo also recorded in different studios around the world, including Basecamp Studios in Stockholm, Ocean Sound Recordings in Ålesund, and SPACE in Austin, Texas. The production was handled by Aksel "Axxe" Carlson and Thomas Kongshavn. The former worked with the contemporary soundscape, while Kongshavn worked with the short documentary theatre that is between the music.

== Composition ==
"ZALIL"
On "ZALIL", Karpe finds a lot of inspiration from bhangra pop, and it's also where the harder synth lines begins.

"فاروق القاسم"
The mix between Arabic and Norwegian. Those who understand Arabic will listen to the man, and those who understand Norwegian will listen to the girl.

Sas Plus/Sas Pussy is a hip hop EP that mainly focuses on rap/urban expressions and alternative R&B, while also incorporating elements of Egyptian film music, 1990s bhangra pop like Bally Sagoo, and viral, hyper modern Auto-Tuned punjabi pop like Guru Randhawa. This can be found in the track "ZALIL" that consist of an "omnisphere" sound that is named "Mallet Ballet", with a guitar amp. The track is missing some frequencies and is built with side-chaining, reverberation, and compressions. The missing frequencies create space for other elements, including more distortion, which Aksel "Axxe" Carlson explained as being used for making an element unpredictable. That in the end gives the track a bhangra pop association.

The album has a musically executed expression. It begins in the quiet corner before harder synth lines emerge after ten minutes. Just before the midpoint, a more complex sound image is introduced, with measured beats coming and going. Finally, the EP ends up back in the soft sounds where it started.

The music is constantly interrupted by small documentary clips, which takes the listener out of the music and into the process behind it. The sonic journey Karpe have tried to make is a lot about details that encourage the listeners to get emerged in the making of Sas Plus/Sas Pussy. It is mostly clips of calls and various audio recordings. On the song "فاروق القاسم" there is usage of this method. The sound of the EP is mixed and edited with Apple's Logic Pro X.

== Artwork ==
Both sides' covers of Sas Plus/Sas Pussy

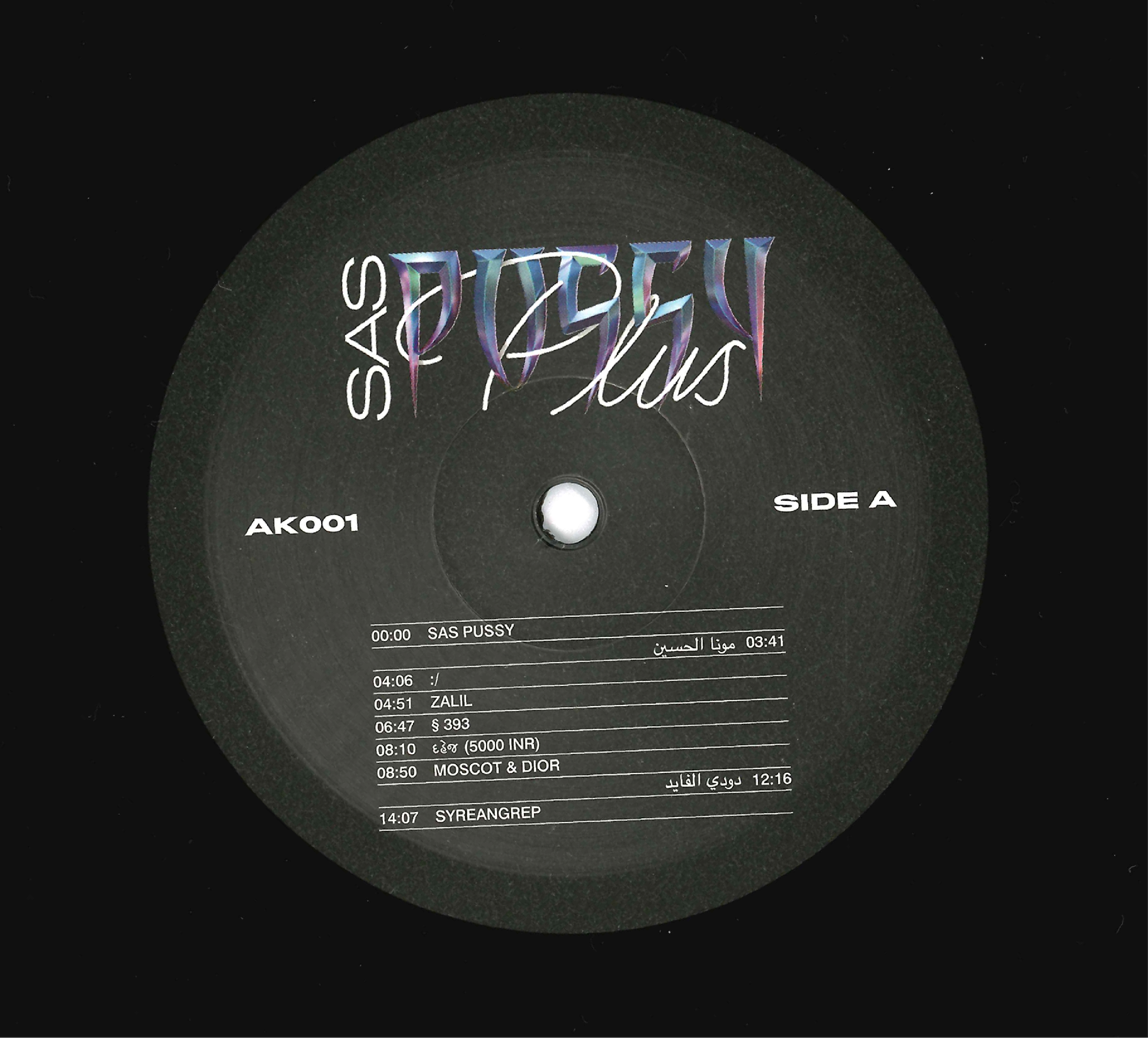
Side A

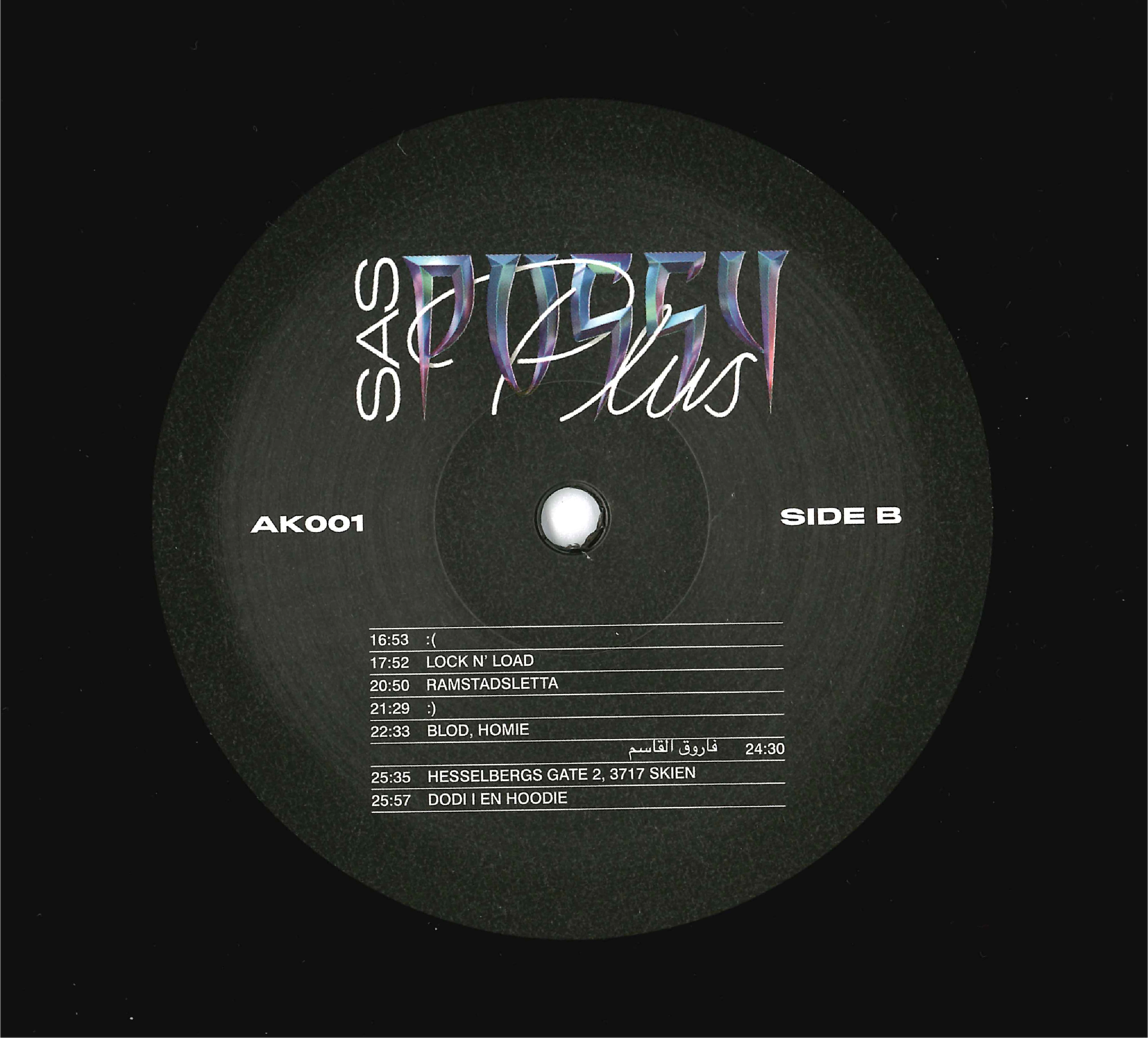
Side B

The cover photo for Sas Plus/Sas Pussy was taken by Michael Ray Vera Cruz Angeles, an Oslo-based photographer. The design for the cover was done by Even Suseg and Gustav Myhre Öster. The photo is of a male from behind, who has pearls around his neck. The bottom part of the cover shows a list of 17 tracks with a timestamp and logo for the release. The alternative cover displays the same person's neck, but from the front of him. The week before the release of the EP, Karpe posted a lot of different photos on their Instagram account. One of the images was of pearls.

On April 23, 2020, the company Also Known As won a prize for the best graphic design in Grafill’s yearly design awards, based on the company's work with the graphical design on Sas Plus/Sas Pussy. The jury explains the verdict with "Sas Plus/Sas Pussy challenges our design principals and is an example of taking visual communication a step further. The project is genre-free and without rules, and free of standard conventions". (Note: Original: Sas Plus/Sas Pussy utfordrer faget vårt og er et eksempel på å ta visuell kommunikasjon et skritt videre. Prosjektet er sjangerløst og uten regler, uten spesifikke flater/kanaler og fri for konvensjoner.)

On September 19, 2019, Karpe released an LP record of Sas Plus/Sas Pussy. It is a single record with eight tracks on each side. The album has the same cover art as the digital version, but on the back it has the alternative cover. The cover opens as a book; inside it is a full side with the lyrics for the release. On the other side, there are images of the recording process from studios and hotel rooms, and the liner notes at the bottom.

== Release and promotion ==
Inspiration for the EP

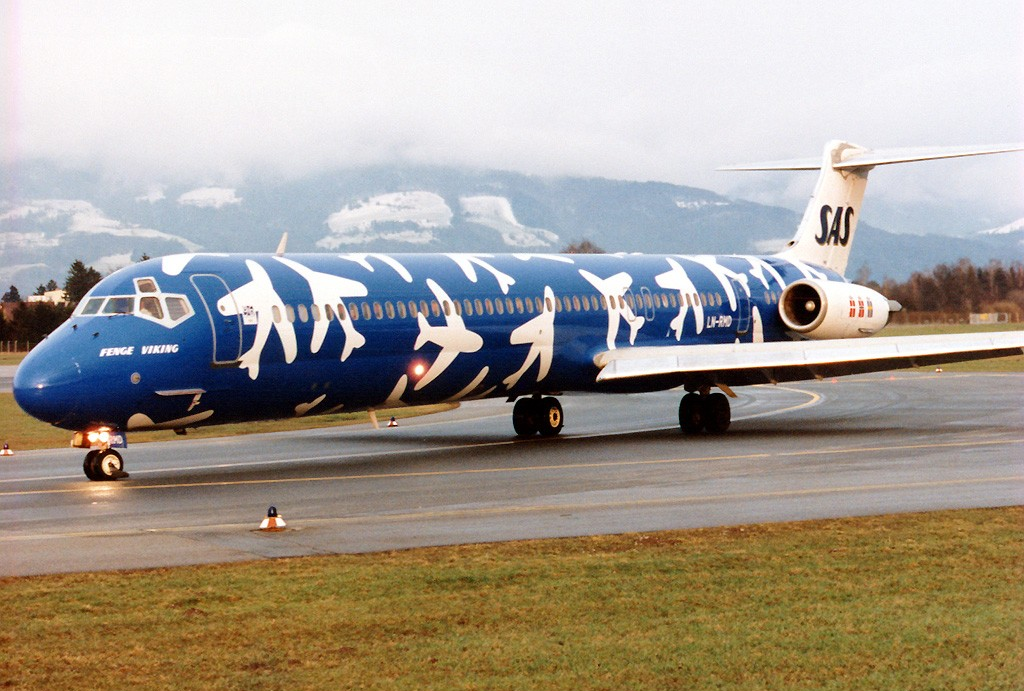
A Scandinavian Airlines aircraft in 1996.

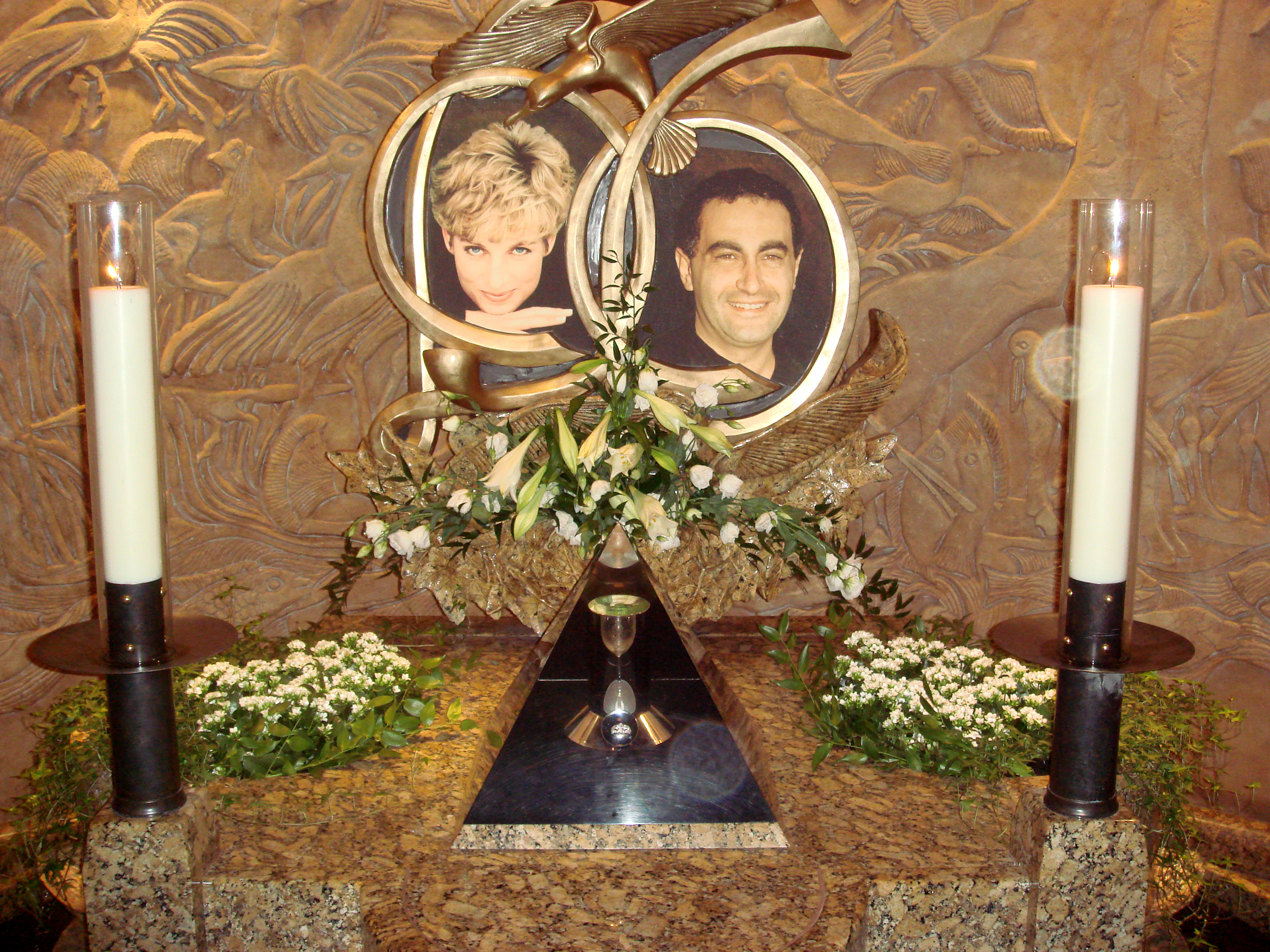
Picture of Princess Diana, Princess of Wales and Dodi Al-Fayed.

In the fall of 2019, Karpe announced a tour in Norway with exclusively club concerts that sold out quickly. Days after the announcement, the duo started to post mysterious photos and videos with equally mysterious captions on their Instagram account. They used photos or videos of Princess Diana, Dodi Al-Fayed, Farouk Al-Kasim, Hussein of Jordan, Muna al-Hussein, Pakistani singers, map of Youngstorget and older pictures of SAS aircraft, among others. Chirag later explained the background for the images and videos:

"We try to create a picture of what has been going on inside our heads as we made the music. Then it would be weird to take nice press pictures in nice clothes and say, "hello everyone, we are releasing new music". Many people finds it damn annoying. Why do they have to see a picture of a 1996 SAS aircraft when they were not born at that time? But it was right for us to promote it in this way, for this project". (Note: Original: Vi prøver å lage et bilde av hva som har foregått inne i hodene våre når vi har satt sammen musikken. Da ville vært veldig rart å ta typiske pressebilder i pene klær og si, «halla alle sammen, vi slipper ny musikk». Mange synes det er ekstremt irriterende. Hvorfor må de se bilde av et SAS-fly fra 1996 når de var ikke født da? Men det var rett for oss å vise frem prosjektet på denne måten.)

On February 21, 2019, Karpe posted a picture on Instagram of the official album cover with the caption "«SAS PLUS / SAS PUSSY» ute om 5 timer<3". (Note: translation: "SAS PLUS / SAS PUSSY" release in 5 hours<3) The following day, the EP was made available on streaming services and for digital download. They also released a website with the lyrics of the album and the text has different hyperlinks to Wikipedia articles, YouTube videos, and news sites, among others. On September 19, 2019, the duo released an LP version of Sas Plus/Sas Pussy, which was distributed by Sony Music in Norway.

On August 17, 2020, Karpe shared a post on social media about transferring the right to revenue associated with all their releases between Glasskår and Sas Plus/Sas Pussy to "Patel & Abdelmaguid Foundation AS" (PAF), free of charge. Stating that all the revenue from all of these releases to causes relating to assistance for refugees, asylum seekers or immigrants. They also announced the album Sas Plus/Sas Pussy (PAF Version), a "sliced" version of the EP with seventeen tracks.

== Critical reception ==
Professional ratings
Review scores
Source	Rating
Aftenposten	4/6
Dagbladet	6/6
Gaffa	3/6 stars
iTromsø	5/6
Klassekampen	5.5/6 stars
Musikknyheter	8/10
VG	5/6

As of February 2020, Sas Plus/Sas Pussy is Karpe's most critically acclaimed release. Mathias Rødahl from Dagbladet gave the EP a top score, and summed up the listening experience by saying "at the center of it all is the class journey - both their own and their parents. From horse-drawn vehicle in rural India, to Audi A4 at Skedsmokorset. From young amateur rappers with a dream, to Norway's most popular and best paid superstars". (Note: Original: I sentrum for det hele står klassereisen – både deres egen og foreldrenes. Fra hest og kjerre på landsbygda i India, til Audi A4 på Skedsmokorset. Fra unge amatør-rappere med en drøm, til Norges mest ettertraktede og best betalte stjerner.) Rødahl ended the review by praising Sas Plus/Sas Pussy as Karpe's best project, noting a lot of help from Axle "Axxe" Carlson and Thomas Kongshavn, as well as melodic assistance from Isah. Marianne Lein Moe from iTromsø finds the lyric as a stream of consciousness, filled with associations and references, both internal and understandable. Moe also praises the productions by Aksel "Axxe" Carlsson and Thomas Kongshavns. She ended the review with stating "it's actually fun to get into and listen to. Which of course is because the music is good, which is first and foremost the most important thing". Tor Martin Bøe from VG was impressed by the EP and described it as "innovative and fascinating". Bøe also comment the untraditional length of the release: "Instead of releasing a conventional album or playlist, SAS PLUS / SAS PUSSY is just one long play. Or a single track". He ended the review with praising the textual content and finds it impressive.

Henrik Årby from Musikknyheter describes the soundscape of the release as the most ambitious ever to be released by Karpe. Årby finds the variety as wide but at the expense of traditional singles. He ended the review with calling the album “genius” and praised the duo for taking some bold moves. Eivind August Westad Stuen from Aftenposten compares the release with the previous album, Heisann Montebello, as just another ambitious project. Stuen finds it to be a concept album, with a mix of languages, cultures and lifestyles as the main theme. He ended the review stating “Karpe's career has been a rising curve. This release may not take them to new heights but is nevertheless an interesting listening experience”. Geir Magne Staurland from GAFFA was not so pleased with the EP and described it as "textually poor". He explain the statement with "Karpe's reputation for being a whole generation's most important flagship, that they masterfully manage to convey strong, artistic ideas, is apparently nowhere to be found". Staurland compares the soundscape to the previous album, Heisann Montebello, with a flow that still works well, and a variety of songs. Staurland also praises the producers, Aksel "Axxe" Carlson and Thomas Kongshavn, for their work on the release, and ended the review with "as leading hip hop artists, more should be expected".

=== Accolades ===
Sas Plus/Sas Pussy was nominated for Hyundai Nordic Music Prize 2019, an award for the Best Nordic Album of the Year, given annually during by:Larm, the music industry conference held in Oslo, Norway. On January 23, 2020, the nominees for the Spellemann Awards 2019 were presented, with Karpe being nominated in the categories Urban and Album of the Year for Sas Plus/Sas Pussy. The duo were also nominated in the category Songwriter of the Year. Due to the COVID-19 pandemic, Oslo municipality prohibited all arrangement with above 500 people. Therefore, the awards show moved to be arranged over difference digital broadcasting options on March 28, 2020 organised by NRK. The duo won the category Album of the Year. Isah, that contributed to the EP, won in the categories Urban and Breakthrough of the Year & Gramo scholarship.

== Track listing ==
Sas Plus/Sas Pussy track listing
No.	Title	Writer(s)	Producer(s)	Length
1.	"Sas Plus/Sas Pussy"	Chirag Rashmikant Patel; Magdi Omar Ytreeide Abdelmaguid; Kaleb Isaac Ghebreiesus; Aksel "Axxe" Carlson; Eirik Kiil Saga; Thomas Kongshavn; Emilie Nicolas Kongshavn	Axxe; Kongshavn	29:47
Total length:				29:47

Sas Plus/Sas Pussy (PAF version)
No.	Title	Writer(s)	Producer(s)	Length
1.	"00:00 Sas Pussy"	Patel; Abdelmaguid; Axxe; Saga; Kongshavn; E. N. Kongshavn	Axxe; Kongshavn	3:41
2.	"03:41 مونا الحسين" (translated: Muna Al-Hussein)	Patel; Abdelmaguid; Axxe; Saga; Kongshavn; E. N. Kongshavn	Axxe; Kongshavn	0:25
3.	"04:06 :/"	Patel; Abdelmaguid; Axxe; Saga; Kongshavn; E. N. Kongshavn	Axxe; Kongshavn	0:45
4.	"04:51 Zalil"	Patel; Abdelmaguid; Axxe; Saga; Kongshavn	Axxe	1:56
5.	"06:47 § 393"	Patel; Abdelmaguid; Axxe; Saga; Kongshavn	Axxe	1:23
6.	"08:10 દફેજ (5000 Inr)" (translated: Dowry (5000 INR))	Patel; Abdelmaguid; Axxe; Saga; Kongshavn	Axxe	0:40
7.	"08:50 Moscot & Dior"	Patel; Abdelmaguid; Axxe; Saga; Kongshavn	Axxe; Kongshavn	3:26
8.	"12:16 دودي الفايد" (translated: Dodi Al-Fayed)	Patel; Abdelmaguid; Axxe; Saga; Kongshavn	Axxe; Kongshavn	1:51
9.	"14:07 Syreangrep"	Patel; Abdelmaguid; Ghebreiesus; Axxe; Saga; Kongshavn	Axxe; Kongshavn	2:46
10.	"16:53 :("	Patel; Abdelmaguid; Ghebreiesus; Axxe; Saga; Kongshavn	Axxe; Kongshavn	0:59
11.	"17:52 Lock N' Load"	Patel; Abdelmaguid; Ghebreiesus; Axxe; Saga; Kongshavn	Axxe; Kongshavn	2:58
12.	"20:50 Ramstadsletta"	Patel; Abdelmaguid; Ghebreiesus; Axxe; Saga; Kongshavn	Axxe; Kongshavn	0:39
13.	"21:29 :)"	Patel; Abdelmaguid; Ghebreiesus; Axxe; Saga; Kongshavn	Axxe; Kongshavn	1:04
14.	"22:33 Blod, Homie"	Patel; Abdelmaguid; Ghebreiesus; Axxe; Saga; Kongshavn	Axxe; Kongshavn	1:57
15.	"24:30 فاروق القاسم" (translated: Farouk Al-Kasim)	Patel; Abdelmaguid; Ghebreiesus; Axxe; Saga; Kongshavn	Axxe; Kongshavn	1:05
16.	"25:35 Hesselbergs Gate 2, 3717 Skien"	Patel; Abdelmaguid; Ghebreiesus; Axxe; Saga; Kongshavn	Axxe; Kongshavn	0:22
17.	"25:57 Dodi i En Hoodie"	Patel; Abdelmaguid; Axxe; Saga; Kongshavn; E. N. Kongshavn	Axxe; Kongshavn	3:50
Total length:				29:47

Notes

- All track titles are stylized in all caps.
- "00:00 Sas Pussy" features vocals by Emilie Nicolas
- "08:10 દફેજ (5000 Inr)" features voices by Rashmikant I. Patel
- "12:16 دودي الفايد" features voices by Mohammed Abdelmaguid and Kristin Jess Rodin
- "14:07 Syreangrep" features vocals by Isah
- "17:52 Lock N' Load" features vocals by Isah
- "20:50 Ramstadsletta" features additional voices by Michael Ray Angeles, Erik Kiil Saga, Isah, Anita Patel Jusnes, Oda Felicia Bardal Sigstad Abdelmaguid, Beyoumi Johan, Sofian Even and Jakob Mamdouh
- "22:33 Blod, Homie" features vocals by Isah
- "24:30 فاروق القاسم" features vocals by Isah
- "25:35 Hesselbergs Gate 2, 3717 Skien" features additional voices by Michael Ray Angeles and Sebastian Ekeberg
- "25:57 Dodi i En Hoodie" features vocals by Isah and Emilie Nicolas

== Personnel ==
Musicians

- Aksel "Axxe" Carlson – keyboards (all tracks), bass (all tracks)
- Thomas Kongshavn – keyboards (all tracks), guitar (all tracks), bass (all tracks)
- Magdi Omar Ytreeide Abdelmaguid – theremin (all tracks)
- Marius Bjørnson – keyboards (all tracks)
- Eirik Kiil Saga – keyboards (all tracks), piano (all tracks)
- Madeleine Ossum – strings (all tracks)
- Kaja Fjellberg Pettersen – strings (all tracks)

Technical

- Sören Von Malmoborg – mastering (all tracks), mixing (all tracks)
- Axxe – mixing (all tracks), engineer (all tracks), programming (all tracks)
- Thomas Kongshavn – mixing (all tracks), engineer (all tracks), programming (track 1-3, 7-17), sound design (track 1-6, 9-17)
- Even Ormestad – engineer (track 17)
- Henning Svoren – engineer (all tracks)
- Tobias "Astma" Jimson – programming (track 13-16)
- Peder Jørgensen – sound design (track 1-6, 9-17)

Studio

- Recording Studio: Basecamp Studios (Stockholm, Sweden), Albatross Recorders (Oslo, Norway), SPACE (Austin, Texas), Ocean Sound Recordings (Ålesund, Norway), and a number of hotel rooms
- Mixing Studio: SPACE and Basecamp Studios
- Mastering Studio: Cosmos Mastering

== 2019 tour ==
On March 9, 2019, Karpe started on their tour, with 23 concerts in Norway and seven in other places around Europe on the program. This included four concerts at Rockefeller in Oslo, two at Studentersamfundet in Trondheim, and the latter amount at USF Verftet in Bergen, among others. Compared to the previous concert at Oslo Spektrum named "Heisann Spektrum" in 2017, the tour was set to be in an intimate setting. The setting was with a stage in the middle of the room and audiences on all sides, while the band and DJ were distributed on three platforms along the walls. Karpe performed a mix of Sas Plus/Sas Pussy and previously released music, such as "Rett i foret", "Hvite menn som pusher 50" and "Hus/hotell/slott brenner" from Heisann Montebello.

Sofie Braseth from Dagbladet reviewed the concert at kroa i bø, grading it three stars out of five. Breaseth complemented the intimate setting, but said "the concert at Kroa perceives somehow underwhelming in light of past mega performances, but by all means: Karpe can undoubtedly create a party". (Note: Original: Konserten på Kroa oppleves noe underveldende i lys av tidligere megaprestasjoner, men for all del: Karpe kan utvilsomt skape fest.) She found the concert inconsistent. On December 5, 2019, the duo announced a huge new project. They are slated to occupy Oslo Spektrum for a month with ten concerts in August 2021. Karpe have played in the venue several times before. The first time in 2013 with one sold-out show, after the success of their fourth studio album Kors på halsen, ti kniver i hjertet, mor og far i døden (2012). Karpe's second time was in 2017 with three sold-out concerts in promotion of Heisann Montebello.

Karpe at Hamar kulturhus in 2019
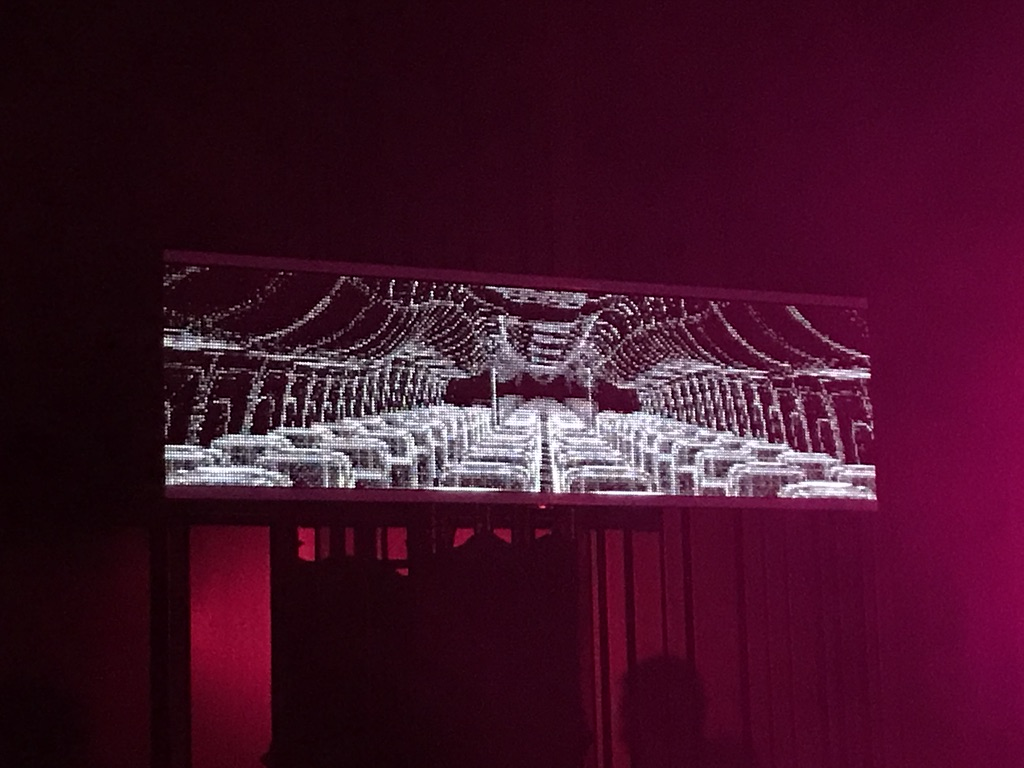
One of the screens used for the occasion.

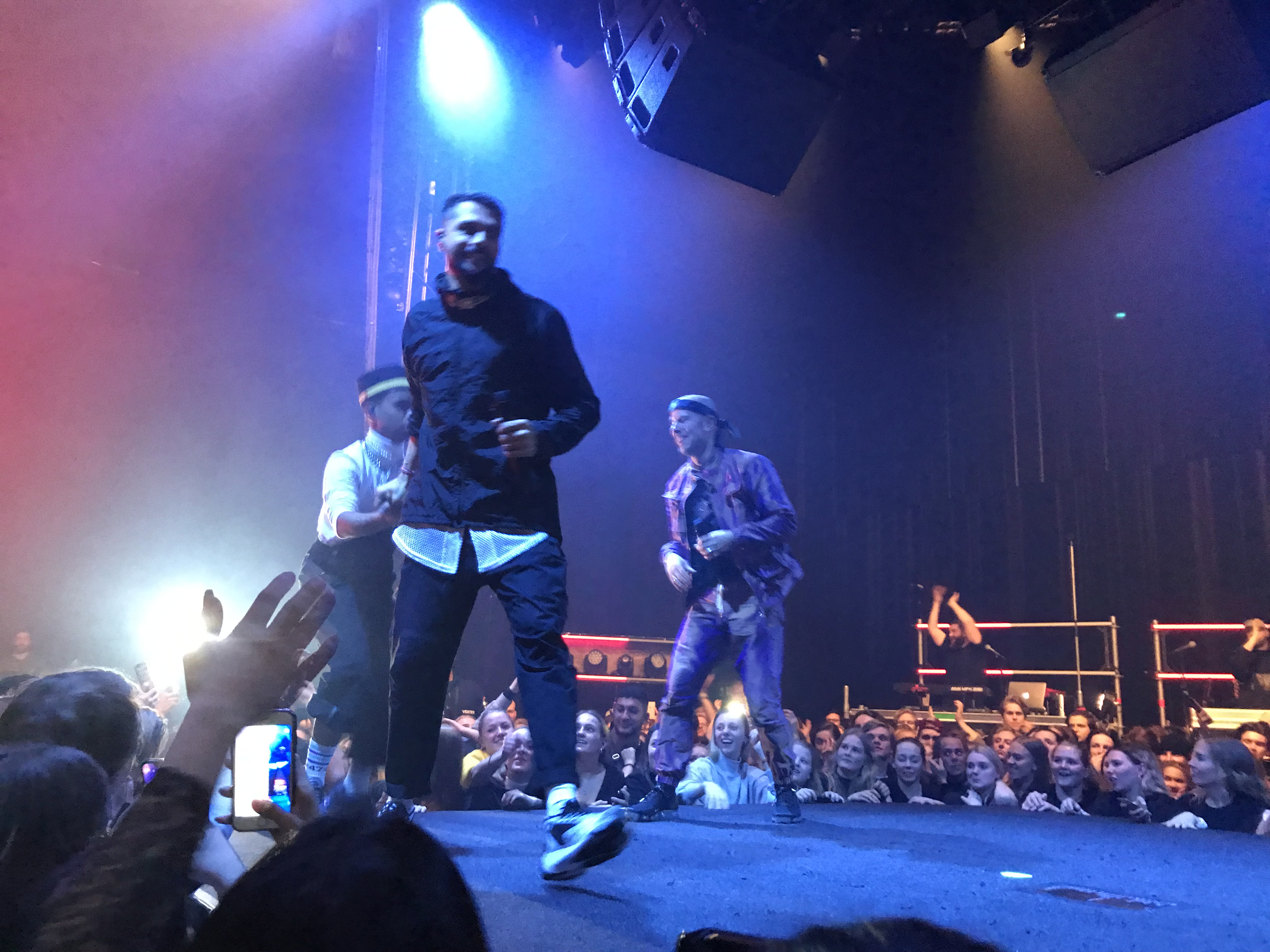
Karpe and Isah.

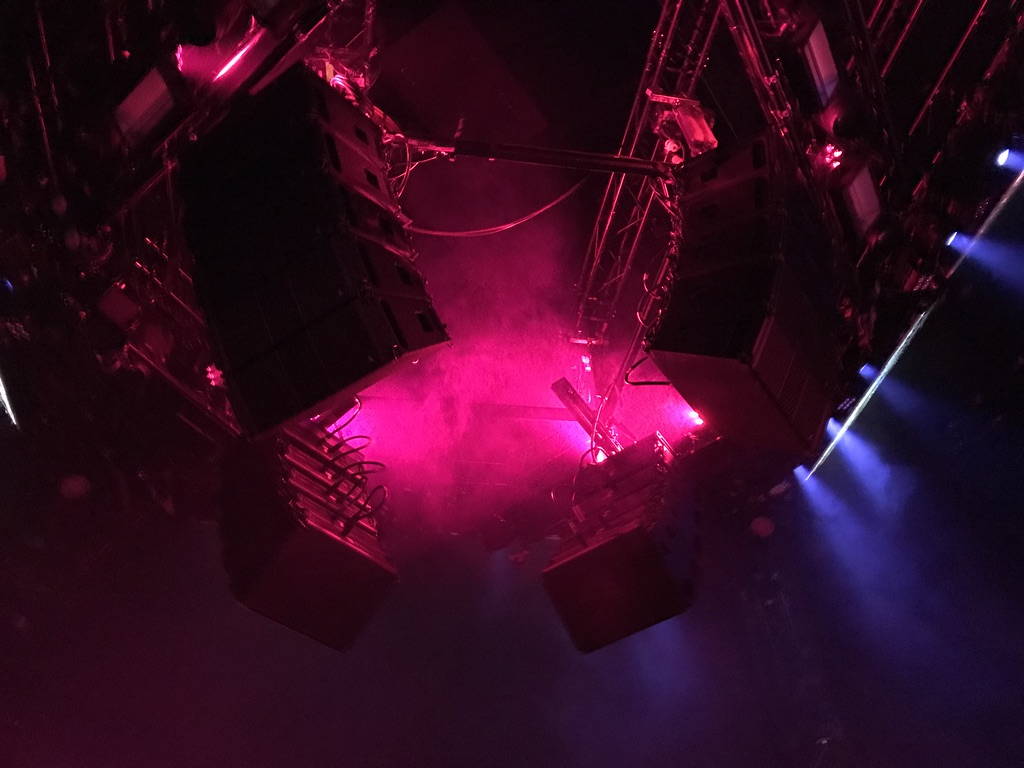
Speakers that were used for the occasion.

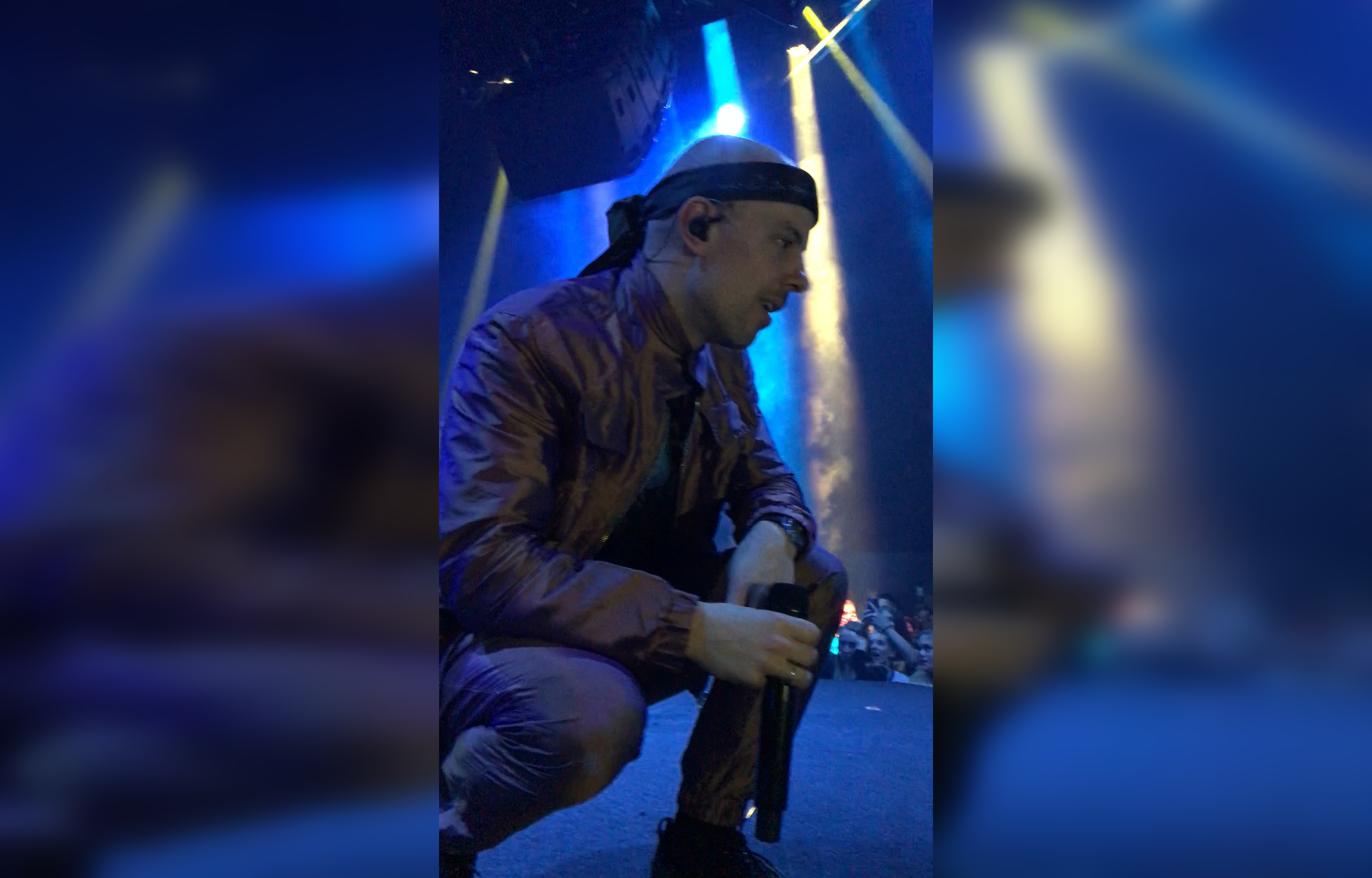
Magdi.

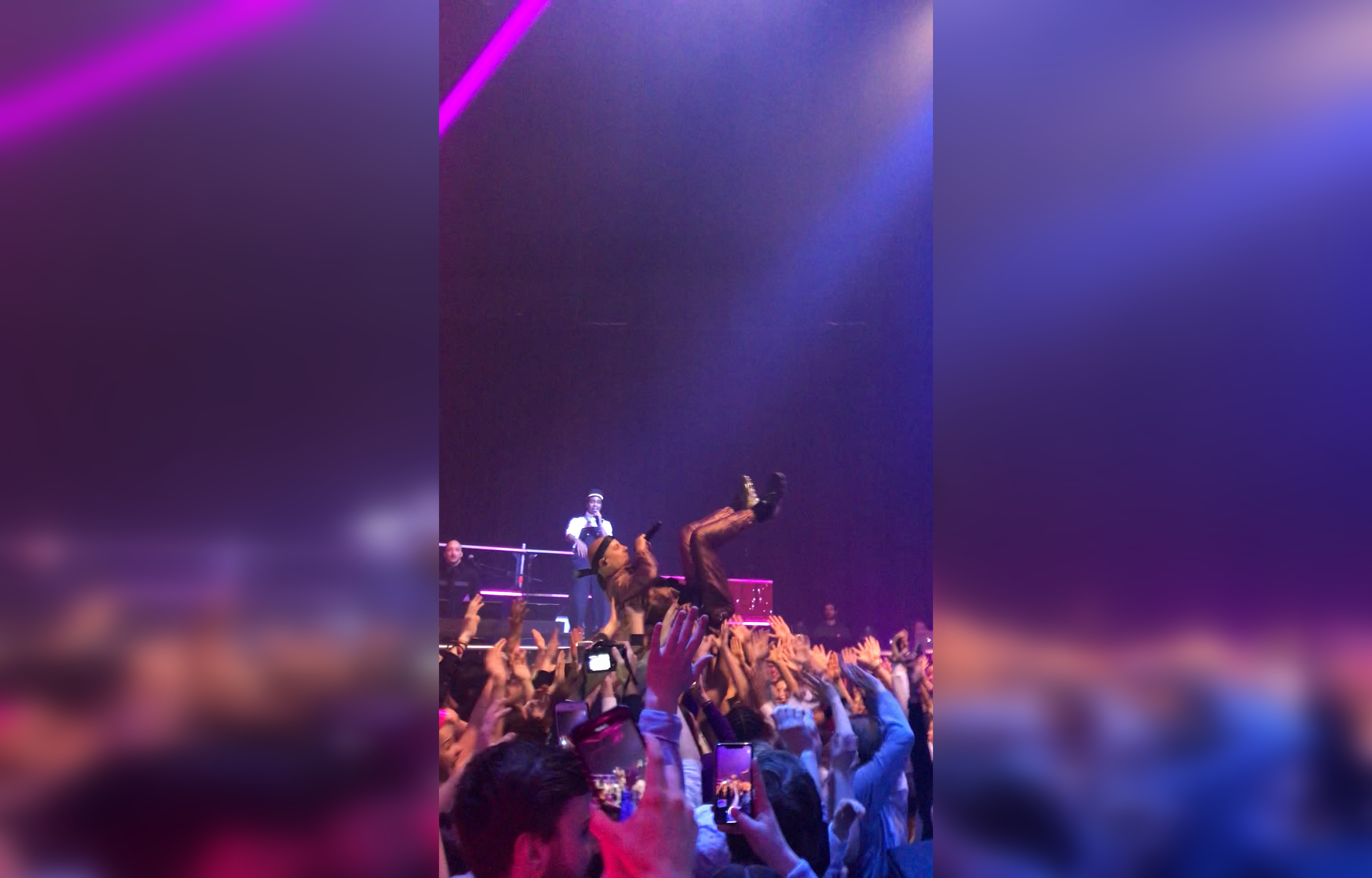
Magdi doing a "stage dive".

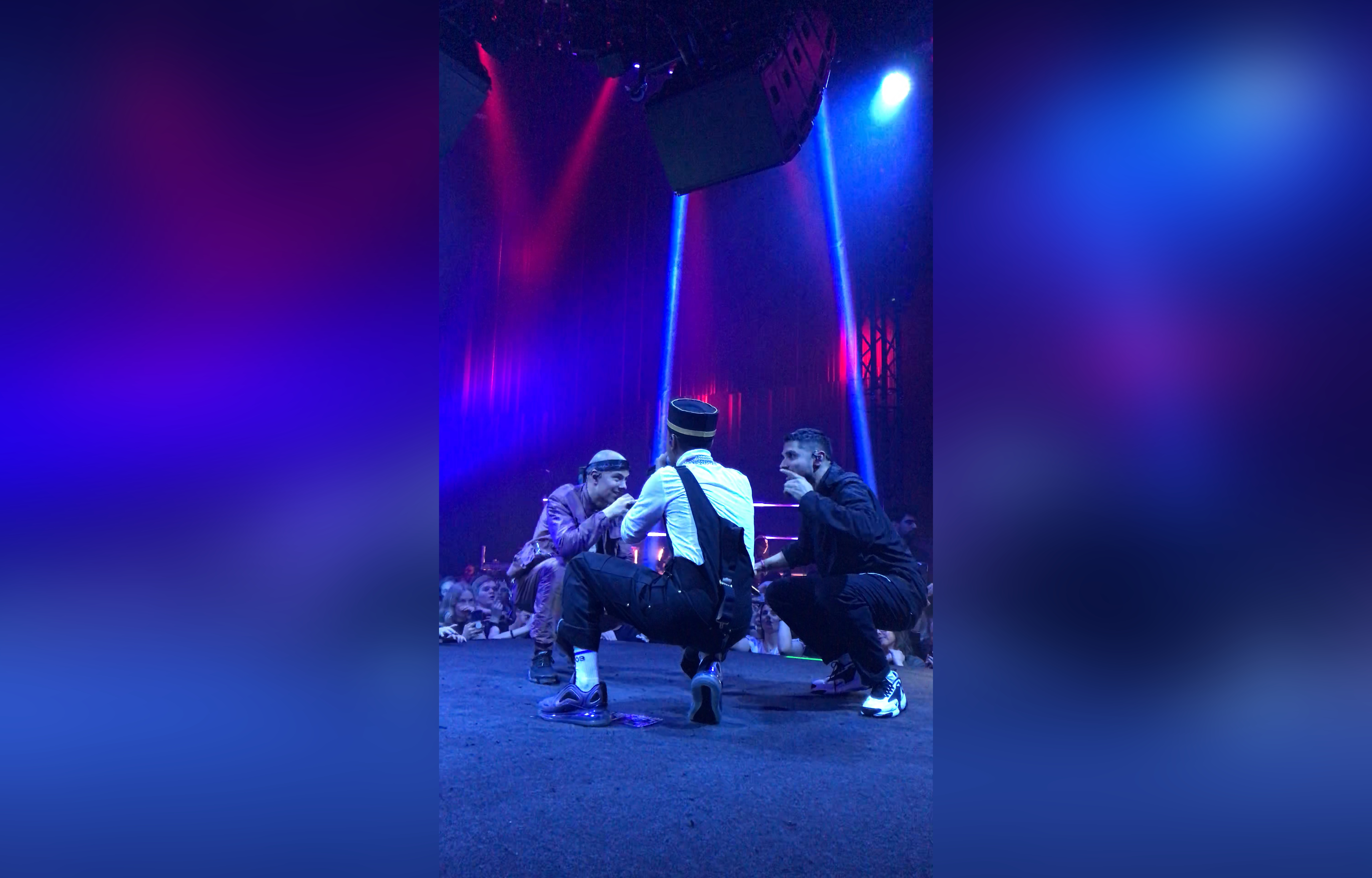
Karpe and Isah.

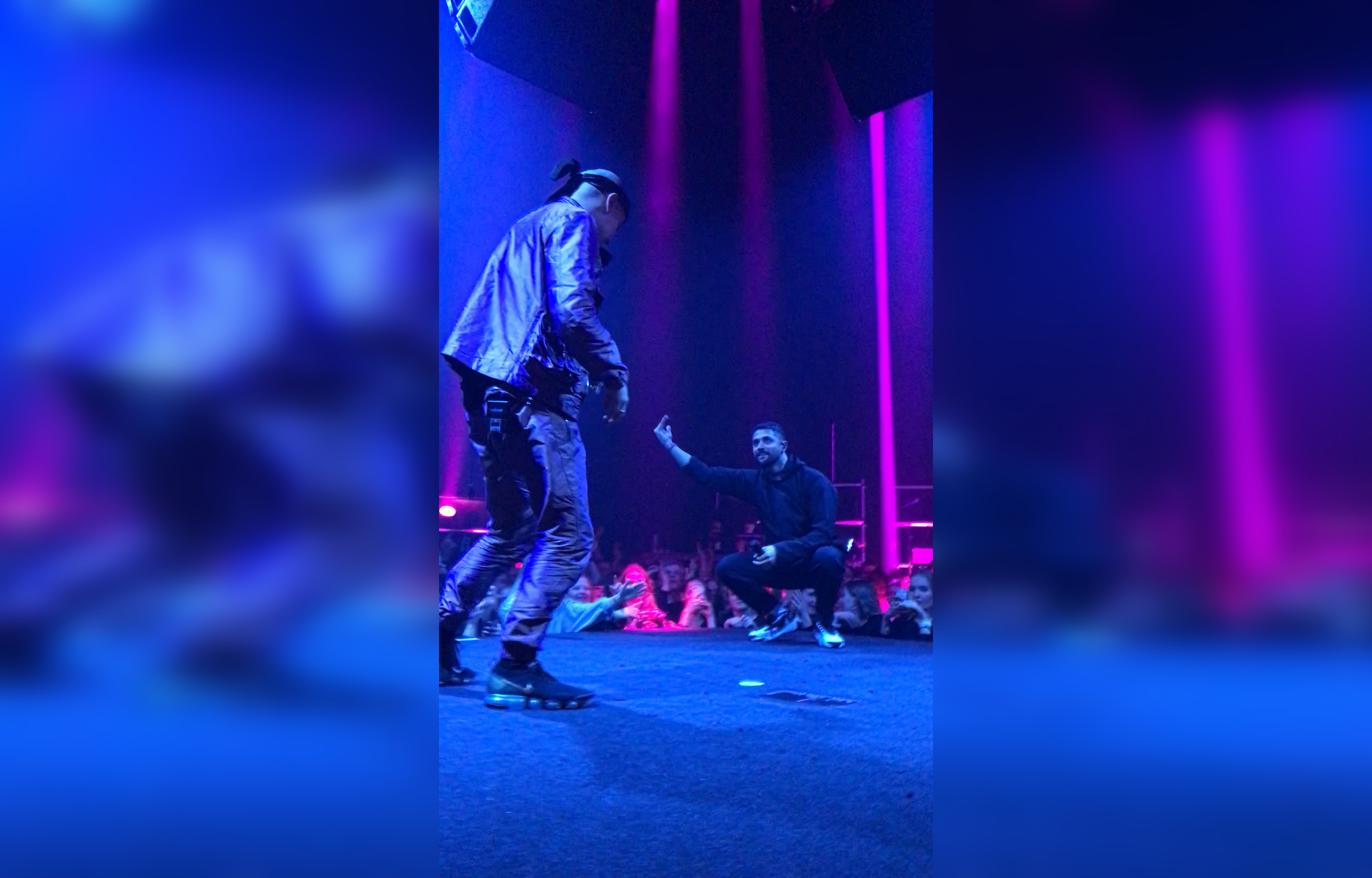
Magdi and Chirag.

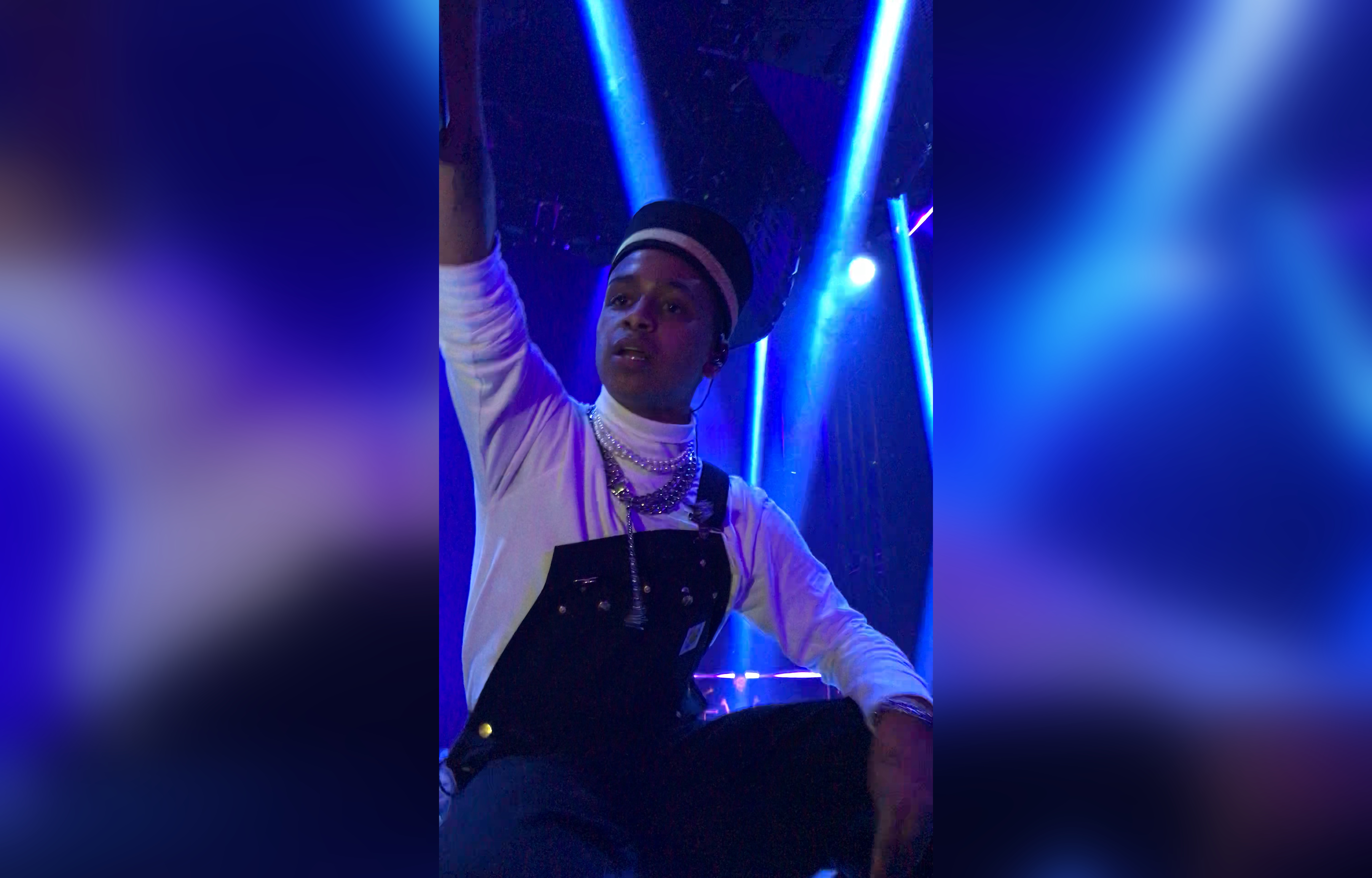
Isah.

== Charts ==
Chart performance for Sas Plus/Sas Pussy
Chart (2019)	Peak position
Norwegian Albums (VG-lista)	3

== Release history ==
Release history and formats for Sas Plus/Sas Pussy
Region	Version	Date	Format(s)	Label	Ref.
Norway	Sas Plus/Sas Pussy	February 22, 2019	Digital download; streaming	Apen og Kjeften; Sony Music	
Norway	Sas Plus/Sas Pussy	September 19, 2019	Vinyl	Apen og Kjeften; Sony Music	
Norway	Sas Plus/Sas Pussy (PAF version)	August 17, 2020	Digital download; streaming	Patel & Abdelmaguid Foundation	
