= Jesper Jenset =

Norwegian singer and songwriter (born 1997)

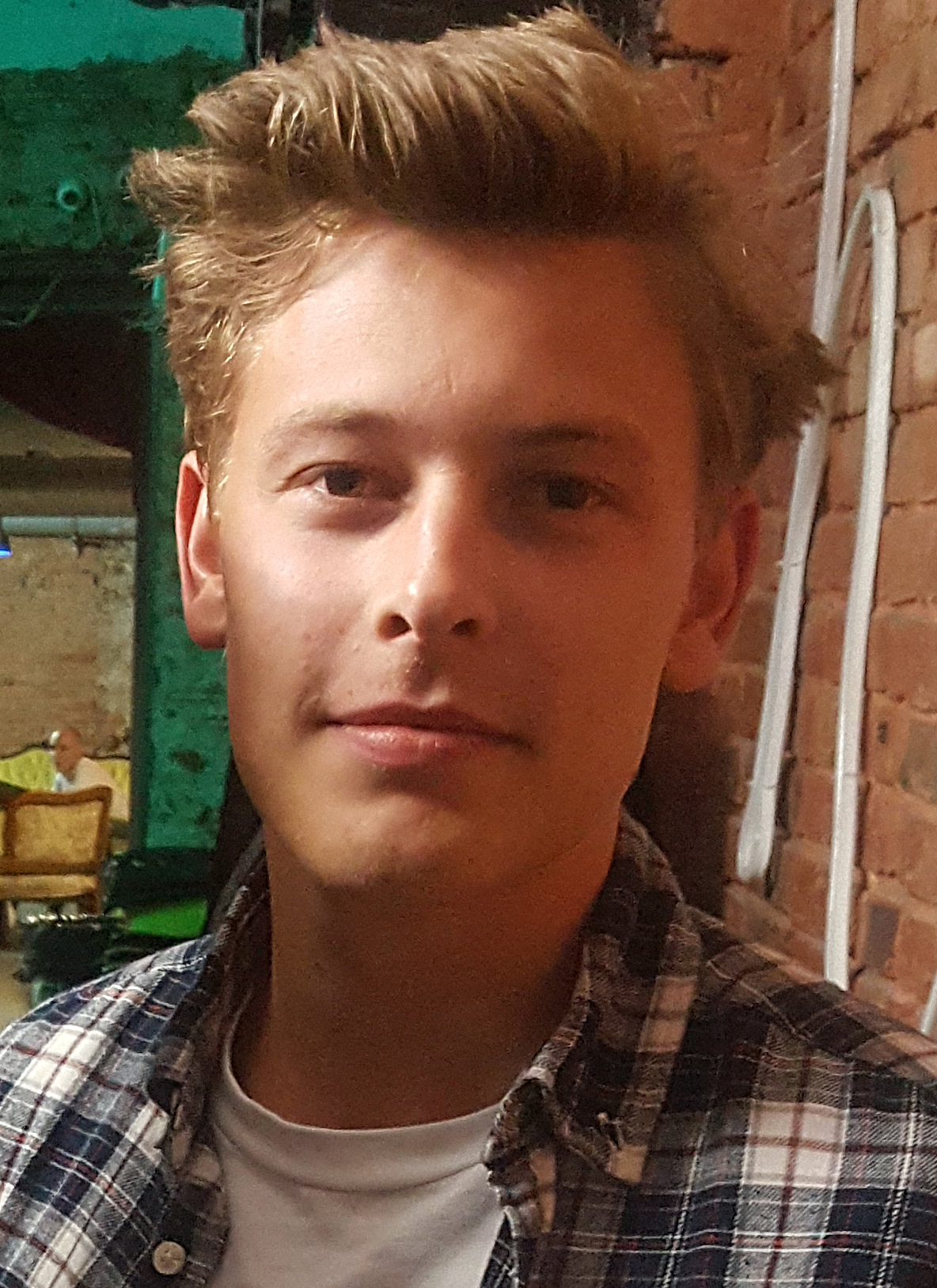
- Jesper Jenset in 2019

Background information
- Born: Jesper Jenset; 19 August 1997 (age 29); Molde Municipality, Norway
- Occupations: Singer; songwriter
- Years active: 2014–present
- Musical career
- Genres: Scandipop; dance-pop
- Instruments: Vocals; guitar
- Labels: Sony; RCA; Ultra; Eccentric

Jesper Jenset (born 19 August 1997) is a Norwegian singer and songwriter. He rose to prominence after finishing fifth in the Norwegian edition of Pop Idol, entitled Idol - Jakten på en superstjerne in 2014, which led him to sign a record deal with Sony Music. Jenset has since released three extended plays; Waves, Vol. 1, Waves, Vol. 2 and Vol. 3.

== Career ==
Jesper started his career with the release of the promotional Idol single "Call Me Yours". It reached the number 1 position in Norwegian iTunes and fastly got 1 million plays on Spotify. After signing a joint deal with Sony Music and Eccentric, his first single "Superhero" was unveiled in June 2015. The song was certified Gold in Norway. It was followed by "Never Coming Back" in December. In 2016 he released another single, his first internationally, called "High". It was accompanied by a remix EP featuring remixes by Young Bombs and Sjur. It reached the 26 position on the Norwegian chart and went to the top spot on Hype Machine. The track also achieved the 2× Platinum certification in Norway. Jenset performed the song for a VG-lista show in Rådhusplassen. The single "Lies" came out later in the year, and an EP was announced to be released early 2017, however, the plans never fulfilled. A single named "Painkiller" was released in April 2017, with its music video premiering in May. After collaborating with CLMD and Justine Skye on "Never Wanna Lose You", the lead single of his upcoming EP "For Love." was unveiled. A music video for the track was shot in Cuba. His debut EP named Waves Vol. 1 featuring a duet with H.E.R. was released in April 2018.

In July he was featured on Polish DJ Gromee's single "One Last Time" which ended up being a hit in Poland, reaching the number 1 position and being also certified 3× Platinum there. Another single called "Bad Vibrations" came out in September, with its music video directed by Frederic Esnault and featuring actress Emma Draleke premiering on October. It was followed by a feature on American DJ duo Lost Kings' single "Drunk as Hell", also accompanied by an animated video. The following single "Red Eyes", teasing his second EP, was released in January 2019. The second volume of his previous EP, Waves Vol. 2, was released on April 12, 2019 including another single named "Blue Flag / Fun Things".

In August he took part as the featuring artist of Madcon's single "No Lies", co-written by Danny Ocean. Its music video was shot in Marbella. On September 13, his first single in Norwegian "Hver Gang", featuring rapper Arif, was unveiled. It became certified Gold in April 2021. In October, he performed the song along "No Lies", with Madcon, and a cover of "Don't Leave" by British duo Snakehips and Danish singer MØ, with Kapteinen, at the NRK P3 studio. He also co-wrote Alan Walker and Ruben's 2020 single "Heading Home". After collaborating with Ylva on their joint single "Flame", as well as with Gromee in "Sweet Emotions", this later reaching the number 6 position in Poland, Jenset teased his third EP with the release of the double singles "Facade", accompanied by the track "I Like When We", and "Skinny Jeans", along "Someone Else". His third EP Vol. 3 was released in April 2020, as well as another single called "Love Me, I'm a Mess", which music video shot in Jesper's hometown and directed by his friend Magnus Furset, premiered in June. Later that year, Jenset featured on singles "Company" by Norwegian music producer Hvsun and "Not Like This" by Swiss DJ Gil Glaze. In 2021 he appeared on the track "Fucked Up Kids" from Chris Abolade and Amara's debut album Skrubbsår og skallebank.

On June 18, 2021 he came back with his second single in Norwegian "Skyt me i hjertet". Later that year, his collaborations with hip hop artists Avgvstvs in "Seint i september" and Vinni in "Diskotek" were released.

A string of singles followed in 2022; "Gåsehud", "Faded Off" with EDM artists Boye & Sigvardt and Hayes, "Tilbake" with singer Julia Lov and "Håper du har det bra".

In 2023 he released "Tilbake til start".

== Discography ==
=== EPs ===
- Waves, Vol. 1 (2018)
- Waves, Vol. 2 (2019)
- Vol. 3 (2020)

=== Singles ===
==== As lead artist ====
Title	Year	Peak chart positions		Certifications	Album
Title	Year	NOR	POL	Certifications	Album
"Superhero"	2015	—	—	IFPI NOR: Gold	Non-album singles
"Never Coming Back"	2015	—	—		Non-album singles
"High"	2016	26	—	IFPI NOR: 2× Platinum	Non-album singles
"Lies"	2016	—	—		Non-album singles
"Painkiller"	2017	—	—	IFPI NOR: Gold	Non-album singles
"For Love."	2018	—	—		Waves, Vol. 1
"Bad Vibrations"	2018	—	—		Waves, Vol. 2
"Red Eyes"	2019	—	—		Waves, Vol. 2
"Blue Flag / Fun Things"	2019	—	—		Waves, Vol. 2
"Hver Gang" (featuring Arif)	2019	—	—	IFPI NOR: Gold	Non-album singles
"Sweet Emotions" (with Gromee)	2020	—	6		Tiny Sparks
"Flame" (with Ylva)	2020	—	—		Non-album singles
"Facade"	2020	—	—		Vol. 3
"Skinny Jeans"	2020	—	—		Vol. 3
"Love Me, I'm a Mess"	2020	—	—		Vol. 3
"Skyt me i hjertet"	2021	—	—		TBA
"Seint i september" (with Avgvstvs)	2021	—	—	IFPI NOR: Gold	TBA
"Diskotek" (with Vinni)	2021	—	—		TBA
"Gåsehud"	2022	—	—		TBA
"Faded Off" (with Boye & Sigvardt and Hayes)	2022	—	—		TBA
"Tilbake" (with Julia Lov)	2022	—	—		TBA
"Håper du har det bra"	2022	—	—		TBA
"Tilbake til start"	2023	—	—		TBA
"—" denotes a recording that did not chart or was not released in that territory.

==== As featured artist ====
Title	Year	Peak chart positions			Sales	Certifications	Album
Title	Year	POL	CZE	RU	Sales	Certifications	Album
"Never Wanna Lose You" (CLMD featuring Jesper Jenset and Justine Skye)	2017	—	—	338			Phases
"One Last Time" (Gromee featuring Jesper Jenset)	2018	1	33	—	POL: 60,000	POL: 3× Platinum	Non-album single
"Drunk As Hell" (Lost Kings featuring Jesper Jenset)	2018	—	—	—			Paper Crowns
"No Lies" (Madcon featuring Jesper Jenset)	2019	—	—	—			Non-album singles
"Company" (Havsun featuring Jesper Jenset)	2020	—	—	—			Non-album singles
"Not Like This" (Gil Glaze featuring Jesper Jenset)	2020	—	—	—			Non-album singles
"—" denotes a recording that did not chart or was not released in that territory.

=== Promotional singles ===
Title	Year	Album
"Call Me Yours"	2014	Idol 2014
"I Like When We"	2020	Vol. 3
"Someone Else"	2020	Vol. 3

=== Other appearances ===
Title	Year	Other artist(s)	Album
"Fucked Up Kids"	2021	Chris Abolade and Amara	Skrubbsår og skallebank

=== Writing credits ===
Year	Artist	Album	Song	Ref
2018	Jowst	Non-album singles	"Burning Bridges" (with Kristian Kostov)	
2018	Jowst	Non-album singles	"Roller Coaster Ride" (with Manel Navarro and Maria Celin)	
2018	Unge Ferrari	Midt Imellom Magisk Og Manisk	"Familyeh"	
2018	Unge Ferrari	Midt Imellom Magisk Og Manisk	"Basgaje" (with Ylva)	
2019	Arif	Arif i Waanderland	"Eskimoblod" (solo or Sub-Zero featuring Store P)	
2019	Arif	Arif i Waanderland	"Sommeren Van Den Varmeste (Susano)" (featuring Natnael)	
2019	Unge Ferrari	Midt Imellom Magisk Og Manisk (Deluxe)	"Ultra BLÅ"	
2019	Morgan Sulele	Non-album singles	"Fornøyd"	
2020	Alan Walker	Non-album singles	"Heading Home" (with Ruben)	
2021	Stig Brenner	Hvite Duer, Sort Magi	"Du Vet Hvor Du Finner Meg" (with Unge Ferrari)	
2021	Alan Walker	World of Walker	"Man on the Moon" (with Benjamin Ingrosso)	

=== Music videos ===
Song	Year	Director	Ref
"Call Me Yours"	2014	—N/a	
"Superhero"	2015	—N/a	
"High"	2016	Christian Schüssler	
"Lies"	2017	Alvin Santos; Magnus Borka Kloster-Jensen	
"Painkiller"	2017	Alvin Santos	
"For Love."	2018	Frederic Esnault	
"One Last Time"	2018	Frederic Esnault	
"Drunk as Hell"	2018	Tek Ken Siu	
"Bad Vibrations"	2019	Frederic Esnault	
"No Lies"	2019	Robert Wunsch	
"Sweet Emotions"	2020	Michał Braum	
"Love Me, I'm a Mess"	2020	Magnus Furset	
"Skyt me i hjertet"	2021	Stian Werme	
