= CLMD =

Norwegian musician

- Also known as: Martin Danielle, Martin Braph
- Born: Martin Alexander Bjercke; 22 January 1988 (age 38)
- Origin: Snarøya, Bærum, Norway
- Genres: Progressive house, electronica, pop
- Occupations: DJ, record producer, remixer
- Instruments: Music sequencer, synthesizers, drum machine, guitar
- Years active: 2008–present
- Labels: UPNORTH Recordings; Sony Music (2012–present); Ultra Music (2012–present); Axtone; SIZE Records (2011–2012); Trice Recordings; Armada Records; Rising Music; Strictly Rhythm; TriCircle Recordings
- Members: Martin Danielle
- Past members: Carl Louis (2009–2014)

Martin Danielle (born 22 January 1988), commonly known by his stage name CLMD, is a Norwegian music producer, DJ, songwriter and artist.

He is the co-creator and lead member of the electronic music project CLMD, and he founded and manages record company UPNORTH Recordings. He is also the first non vocalist mentor in the history worldwide to be a mentor on the hit television show The Voice. In his career Martin has worked with artists such as Justine Skye, Astrid S, Ingrid Helene Håvik (from Highasakite), Jesper Jenset, and has done official remixes for Bruno Mars, Estelle, Arty, and Nervo among others.

== Early life ==
CLMD started as a project between Carl Louis and Martin Danielle. Carl & Martin first met at the age of 6, and have been close friends ever since. During their high school years, they got introduced to house music and the art of DJing. They are often quoted saying that C-Mos - "2 Million Ways (Axwell Remix)" was the track that got them into electronic music.

== Career ==
CLMDs first international recognized hit was "The Message" under the artist name Carl Louis & Martin Danielle. The track was picked up by Chris Lake and his Rising Music Label and charted by Axwell in 2010. It also went top 10 on Beatport Top 100. This sparked the interest from many big labels, among others Atlantic Records, Big Beat. For Atlantic, Carl and Martin got the opportunity to do official remixes for Bruno Mars (Just The Way You Are) and for Estelle (Fall in Love). The duo then decided to sign with Steve Angello's SIZE Records, where Carl & Martin released their debut EP, "Little EP" in 2011.

In 2012 Carl & Martin re-branded themselves as "CLMD", started their own label, UPNORTH Recordings and signed a worldwide distribution deal with Sony Music. The first release on UPNORTH was the smash hit "Black Eyes & Blue". The song sold to platinum in Norway and was the 3rd most played song on Norwegian radio in 2012. "Black Eyes & Blue" was also the opening track for The Ultra Music Festival 2012 Official After Movie. Their release "The Stockholm Syndrome" sold 6× platinum in Norway.

As a DJ act CLMD have played all over North America and Europe. Some of their major shows includes; Support for Madonna on her MDNA tour (Telenor Arena, Oslo, Norway) Roseland Ballroom (w/Thomas Gold), Size Matters (Governors Island, NY, NY and Fontainebleau, Miami FL,) Club Life (w/Tiesto, Oslo Spektrum, Oslo, Norway)

As of the summer 2014, Carl decided to leave CLMD to focus on his solo career. Martin Danielle is now continuing CLMD as a project and brand. Their release "Wild Men" feat. Sirena is the last release as a duo. The last show as a group where they both played together was at Tulinløkka, Oslo.

In 2015 Martin released three tracks under CLMD. "Keep Dreaming" featuring the vocals of Jared Lee on Ultra Records/Sony Music was released in January. The video featured Playmate Amanda Cerny, which brought additional attention to the track and led to Martins US TV debut on The Morning Show on Playboy TV.

2016 has been the most effective year to date for the CLMD project as its released four single in the first 6 months. "Dust" feat Astrid S, "Wait For Love" (a collaboration with producer KidJoki), "Phoenix" feat Frøder and "Night Train" feat Alida.

"Dust" has become CLMD's biggest release to date with over 13 million streams on Spotify alone. The melody contains interpolations of the late 90s trance hymn 1998 by British DJ duo Binary Finary.

In 2017 Martin was asked to be a mentor on the Norwegian version of the hit TV show The Voice, becoming the first non-vocalist mentor ever worldwide.

== Discography ==
=== Charted singles ===
Title	Year	Peak chart positions		
Title	Year	NOR	SWE	RU
"Dust" (featuring Astrid S)	2016	13	—	—
"Never Wanna Lose You" (featuring Justine Skye, Jesper Jenset)	2017	—	—	338
"Trouble"	2018	22	—	—
"Dance" (with Tungevaag)	2019	12	37	—
"All My Friends" (with Broiler and Torine)	2021	34	—	—
"—" denotes a recording that did not chart or was not released.

=== Singles ===
Year	Single
2012	"Black Eyes and Blue"
2012	"Falling Like Angels"
2013	"Rockefellas 2013"
2013	"The Stockholm Syndrome" (featuring Kish, Frøder)
2013	"Fader"
2014	"Drifting"
2014	"Wild Men" (featuring Sirena)
2015	"Keep Dreaming" (featuring Jared Lee)
2015	"Deadly" (featuring Fann)
2015	"Did it Again" (featuring Nocando)
2016	"Dust" (featuring Astrid S)
2016	"Wait for Love" (featuring Kid Joki)
2016	"Phoenix" (featuring Frøder)
2016	"Night Train" (featuring Alida)
2016	"Stronger" (featuring Davion Farris & Farah Ash)
2017	"Never Wanna Lose You" (featuring Justine Skye, Jesper Jenset)
2018	"Trouble"
2019	"Anything" (featuring Madcon)

== Awards and nominations ==
Accolades
Year	Award giving body	Category	Recipient/Nominated Work	Result
2013	P3 Gull	Newcomer of the Year	CLMD	Nominated
2020	P3 Gull	Song of the Year	CLMD	Nominated

| 2020 || Spellemann Prisen || Song of the Year || CLMD || Nominated |}
