= Sondre Justad =

Norwegian musician and songwriter (born 1990)

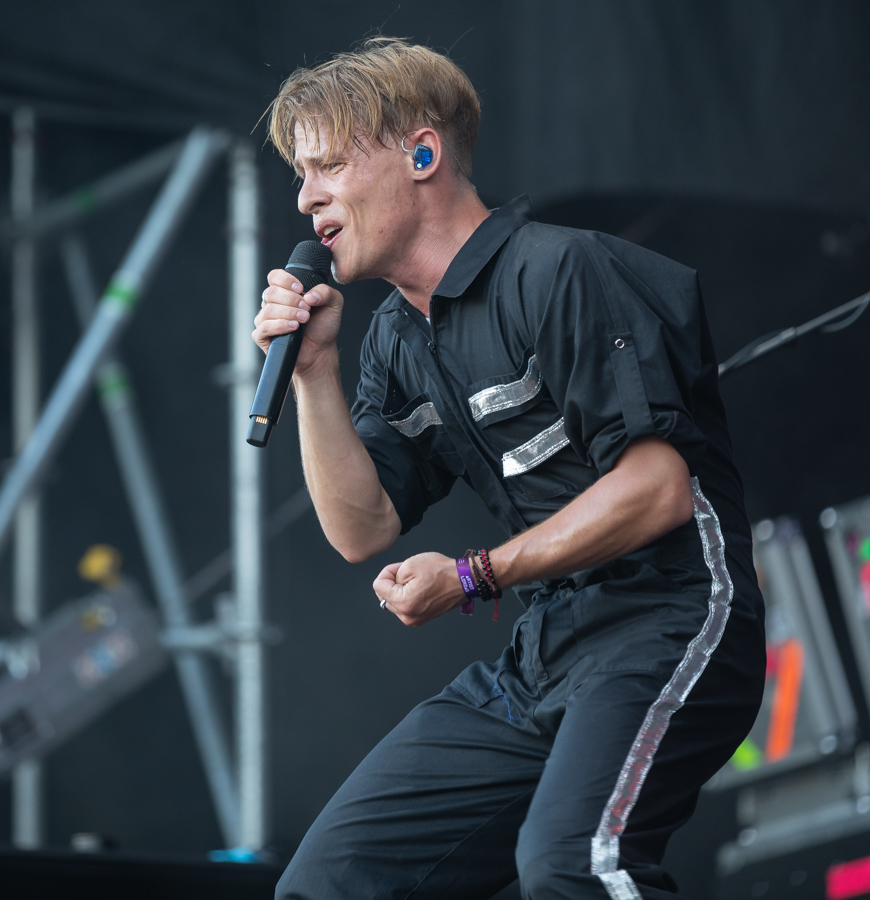
- Justad performing in 2019

Background information
- Born: 15 October 1990 (age 35)
- Origin: Norway
- Genres: Pop
- Occupations: musician, songwriter
- Years active: 2014–present

Sondre Justad (born 15 October 1990) is a Norwegian musician and songwriter.

== Early life ==
Justad grew up in Henningsvær in Lofoten, Northern Norway and went to upper secondary school in Bodø, Northern Norway. He began publishing his own music at the age of 16.

== Career ==
Justad released his first single, "Nu har du mæ", in 2014 on Petroleum Records which was a radio hit. In February and July 2015 he followed up with the singles "Det e over" and "Tilbake".

In October 2015, he released the debut album Riv i hjertet. The album entered the Norwegian chart VG-lista Topp 20. He has also been doing TV appearances on TV2 Senkveld and P3 Gull.

His second album, Ingenting i paradis, released in March 2018, received positive reviews in Norway, with Dagbladet giving it 4/5 stars.

In 2019 he was nominated to four categories of the Spellemannprisen music awards.

== Artistry ==
He sings in the Northern Norwegian dialect. His lyrics are described as being open and honest and are often about love and heartbreak.

== Personal life ==
He is openly bisexual.

== Discography ==
=== Albums ===
- Riv i hjertet (2015)
- Ingenting i paradis (2018)
- En anna mæ (2022) – No. 3 Norway

=== Singles/EP ===
- Nu har du mæ (2014)
- Det e over (2015)
- Tilbake (2015)
- Riv i hjertet (2015)
- Tida vi bare va (2016)
- Ingenting (2017)
- Paradis (2017)
- Gjør det igjen (2018)
- Ikke som de andre (2018)
- Fontena på Youngstorget (2019)
- Pause fra mæ sjøl (2021)
