= Gabrielle Leithaug =

Norwegian pop musician

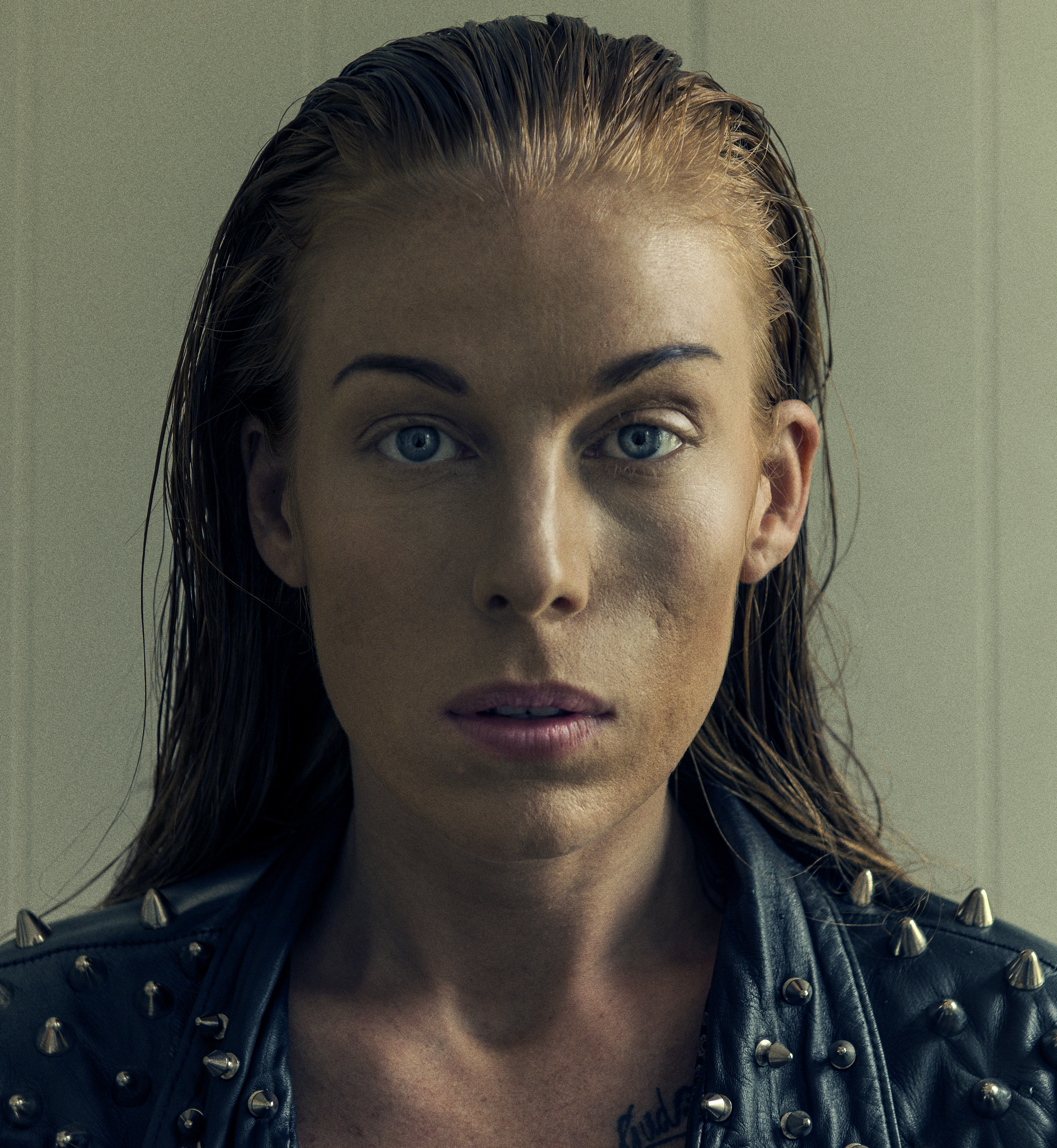

Background information
- Also known as: Gabrielle
- Born: Gabrielle Leithaug; 10 January 1985 (age 41); Bergen, Norway
- Genres: Pop; electropop; indie pop; soul
- Occupations: Singer; songwriter
- Years active: 2011–present
- Label: Universal Music
- Website: www.gabrielleofficial.com

Gabrielle Leithaug (Bergen, 10 January 1985), better known by her mononym artist name Gabrielle, is a Norwegian singer and songwriter. She is best known internationally for her breakout single "5 Fine Frøkner", which appears in the Norwegian TV series Skam.

== Early life ==
Gabrielle was born in Bergen and resided in Hordvik, a neighbourhood in the city's Åsane borough, where she lived for 8 or 9 years. Her family then lived in the city of Bergen for a year, before moving to Bønes in Bergen's Fyllingsdalen borough. She attended upper secondary school in Fyllingsdalen, for one year, and later attended Bergen katedralskole ("Katten").

She worked flipping burgers for around 3 years, and as a cleaner in schools. She also worked as a radio host for a year and a half. She once moved to Stavanger and intended to start an education within reiselivsutdanning, a tourism program. She later studied music at Nord-Trøndelag University College.

She was a member of a gospel choir—Gospel Bergen.

== Career ==
In 2009, Gabrielle competed on the first season of The X Factor Norway and finished in 7th place. After she switched her focus from English lyrics to Norwegian, she signed a contract with Norway's largest record company, Universal Music.

=== 2011–2018: Mildt Sagt, Nattergal and Vekk Meg Opp ===
In 2011, she released her first single, "Ring meg", which reached number one on the Norwegian VG-lista and on iTunes, sold eight times platinum in Norway, and was nominated for the 2012 Spellemannprisen in the category of Hit of the Year. On 2 March 2012, her debut album Mildt Sagt was released on CD, vinyl and digitally. She received the 2014 Edvardprisen in the category of Popular Music for the album Nattergal and was nominated for the Bendiksenprisen for 2014.

The song "5 Fine Frøkner" was nominated for Hit of the Year at the 2015 Spellemannprisen and Song of the Year at the 2014 P3 Gull. The song also gained renewed popularity (especially outside Norway, despite the lyrics being in Norwegian) in January 2017 after being used in an episode of Skam. She was nominated for the 2017 P3 Gull in the category Live Artist of the Year and for the 2018 Spellemannprisen in the category Pop Soloist for the EP Vekk Meg Opp.

=== 2019–2020: Snart, Gabby ===
She released the album Snart, Gabby in 2019 and received three nominations for it ahead of the 2020 Spellemannprisen. She was also awarded the P3 Prize during the 2020 P3 Gull, which recognize artists who had influenced Norwegian music over the years.

=== 2021–2023: Klipp Meg I Ti og Lim Meg Sammen ===
On 22 October 2021, Gabrielle released her fourth studio album, Klipp Meg I Ti og Lim Meg Sammen. For the album, she received the 2022 Spellemannprisen in the Pop category and was nominated for Release of the Year and Songwriter of the Year.

=== 2024–present: Og Eg Lyger Så Det Renner Som en Foss Gjennom Rommet ===
Between March and April 2024, Gabrielle released two singles from her upcoming studio album: "Operahuset" and "Synd Synd Synd". Her fifth studio album, Og Eg Lyger Så Det Renner Som en Foss Gjennom Rommet, was released on 31 May 2024 with Syver Storskogen as producer and Ole Torjus Hofvind as co-producer. For the album, she received the Spellemann Award in the category Release of the Year, and was also nominated for Songwriter of the Year, Pop and the TONO's Composer Award at the 2025 Spellemannprisen. In August 2024, she headlined the Øyafestivalen; her set received critical acclaim.

In 2025, Gabrielle became a coach on the tenth season of the talent competition show The Voice – Norges beste stemme.

== Philanthropy ==
She is a Goodwill Ambassador for Kirkens Nødhjelp, and in that capacity she visited Syrian refugees in Lebanon in 2014.

== Personal life ==
She has previously stated that she is a natural red head and is heterosexual.

She has said that when she was around 19, she loved someone, and the relationship ended, adding "that is possibly the one [breakup] that cut the deepest". She has said that she once moved to Stavanger because she had an intimate relationship with someone who lived there. She has said that she had been in a relationship with a guy for several years, before it ended.

Her tattoos include a verse from the Bible. She is a snowboarder, and spent a winter in Salt Lake City. Leithaug has three sisters and one brother.

She is a Christian and regards faith as "rather personal". In 2006 she said that "being a Christian and being an artist, are two different things for me. But I must sing about something I believe in; I like lyrics that go to some depth. A message about tits and ass and stuff like that, does not cut it for me".

In 2012 she said that she "will not take on a role as a spokeswoman for the Christian artists".

== Discography ==
=== Albums ===
Title	Year	Peak chart positions
Title	Year	NOR
Mildt Sagt	2012	4
Snart, Gabby	2019	5
Klipp Meg I Ti og Lim Meg Sammen	2021	3
Og Eg Lyger Så Det Renner Som en Foss Gjennom Rommet	2024	4

=== Singles ===
Year	Single	Peak chart positions			Certifications (sales thresholds)	Album
Year	Single	NOR	DEN	SWE	Certifications (sales thresholds)	Album
2011	"Ring Meg"	1	—	—	NOR: 10× Platinum	Mildt Sagt
2011	"Bordet"	7	—	—	NOR: 2× Platinum	Mildt Sagt
2012	"Inn I Deg"	—	—	—		Mildt Sagt
2012	"Høster"	—	—	—		Mildt Sagt
2012	"Mildt Sagt"	—	—	—		Mildt Sagt
2012	"Løkken"	—	—	—		Mildt Sagt
2013	"Regn Fra Blå Himmel"	—	—	—		Nattergal - Kap 1
2013	"#Sitterher"	—	—	—		Nattergal - Kap 1
2014	"5 Fine Frøkner"	7	37	4	NOR: 3× Platinum SWE: Platinum	non-album singles
2014	"Ti kniver" (featuring Thomas Eriksen)	—	—	—		non-album singles
2015	"Mer"	—	—	—		non-album singles
2015	"Mellom Skyene"	—	—	—		non-album singles
2015	"De Beste"	—	—	—		non-album singles
2017	"Vekk Meg Opp"	—	—	—		non-album singles
2017	"Venter"	—	—	—		non-album singles
2017	"September"	—	—	—		non-album singles
2017	"Kyrie"	—	—	—		non-album singles
2017	"Du Går Fri"	—	—	—		non-album singles
2017	"Nye Joggesko"	—	—	—		non-album singles

== Awards and nominations ==
Award	Year	Recipient(s)	Category	Result	Ref.
MTV Europe Music Awards	2017	Gabrielle	Best Norwegian Act	Nominated	
Spellemannprisen	2012	"Ring Meg"	Hit of the Year	Nominated	
Spellemannprisen	2013	Mildt Sagt	Newcomer of the Year & Gramo Scholarship	Nominated	
Spellemannprisen	2015	"5 Fine Frøkner"	Hit of the Year	Nominated	
Spellemannprisen	2018	Vekk Meg Opp	Pop Soloist	Nominated	
Spellemannprisen	2020	Snart, Gabby	Album of the Year (Note: This category is presented as Release of the Year since the 2022 Spellemannprisen.)	Nominated	
Spellemannprisen	2020	Snart, Gabby	Songwriter of the Year	Nominated	
Spellemannprisen	2020	Snart, Gabby	Pop Artist	Nominated	
Spellemannprisen	2022	Klipp Meg I Ti og Lim Meg Sammen	Release of the Year (Note: This category was presented as Album of the Year until the 2020 Spellemannprisen.)	Nominated	
Spellemannprisen	2022	Klipp Meg I Ti og Lim Meg Sammen	Songwriter of the Year	Nominated	
Spellemannprisen	2022	Klipp Meg I Ti og Lim Meg Sammen	Pop	Won	
Spellemannprisen	2025	Gabrielle	TONO's Composer Award	Nominated	
Spellemannprisen	2025	Og Eg Lyger Så Det Renner Som en Foss Gjennom Rommet	Release of the Year	Won	
Spellemannprisen	2025	Og Eg Lyger Så Det Renner Som en Foss Gjennom Rommet	Songwriter of the Year (with Syver Storskogen)	Nominated	
Spellemannprisen	2025	Og Eg Lyger Så Det Renner Som en Foss Gjennom Rommet	Pop	Nominated	
