= Karpe =

Norwegian rap group

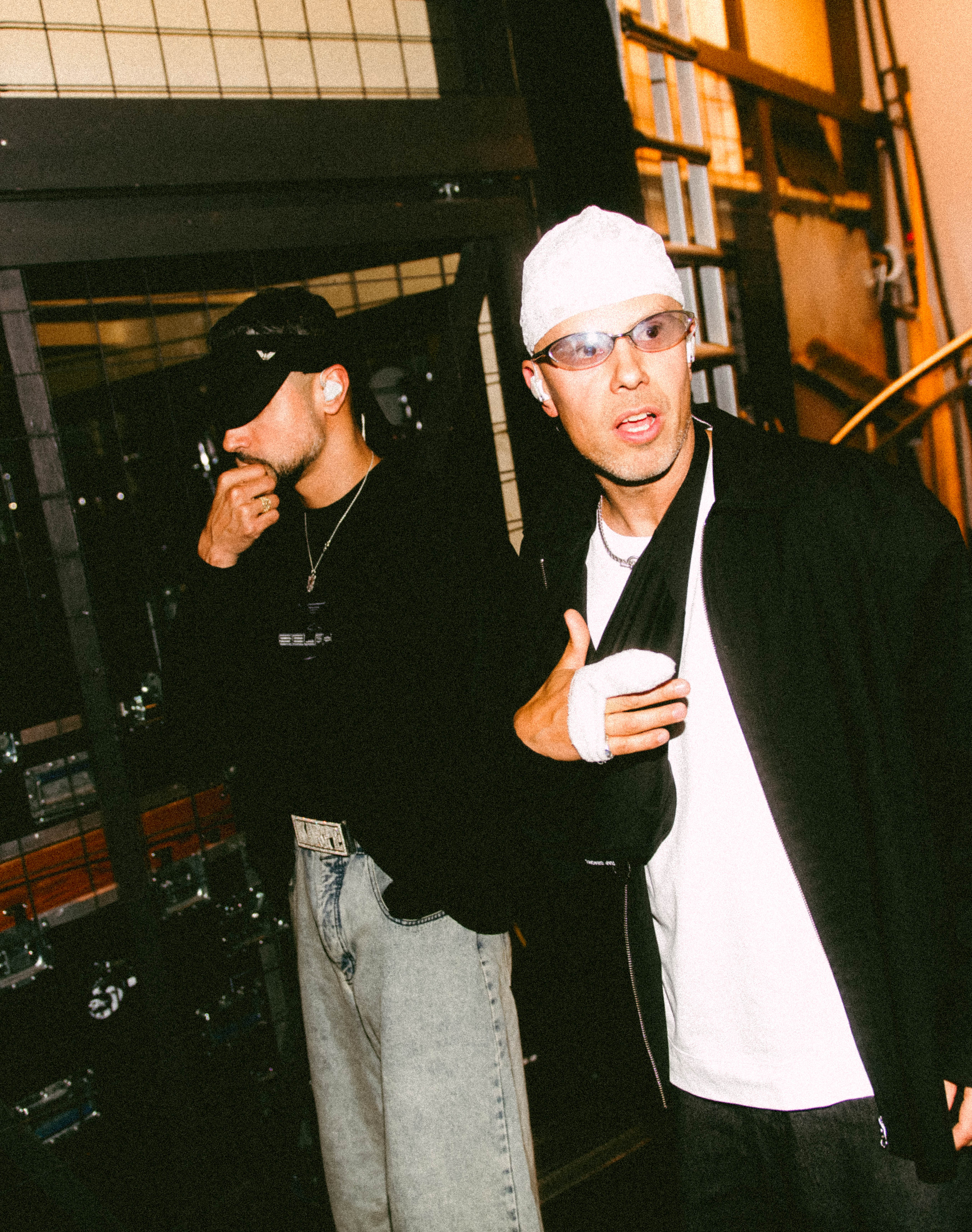
- Karpe on tour 2026

Background information
- Also known as: Karpe Diem
- Origin: Oslo, Norway
- Genres: Hip hop
- Years active: 2000–2028
- Labels: Apen & Kjeften; Petroleum Records; Bonnier Amigo Music Group
- Members: Magdi Omar Ytreeide Abdelmaguid; Chirag Rashmikant Patel
- Website: www.karpe.no

Karpe (previously known as Karpe Diem between 2000 and 2018) is a Norwegian rap group from Oslo, consisting of Magdi Omar Ytreeide Abdelmaguid (b. 1984) and Chirag Rashmikant Patel (b. 1984).

== Biography ==
Magdi Omar Ytreeide Abdelmaguid, of mixed Egyptian/Norwegian origin, was born on 3 June 1984 in Oslo to an Egyptian father and a Norwegian mother from Stryn Municipality in Sogn og Fjordane county. Chirag Rashmikant Patel, of Indian origin, was born on 20 July 1984 in Lørenskog Municipality. His Indian father immigrated from Uganda and Chirag grew up in Oslo. His mother originates from Anand, India.

Magdi and Chirag first met in 1998 in the Oslo Handelsgymnasium, where they were both studying and making music individually. The duo was formed in 2000.

The duo has released eight albums and won a number of awards, including 13 Spellemannprisen awards, making them, together with the Oslo Philharmonic, the most awarded act in the history of the prize.

== Career ==
=== 2004–now ===
Karpe's debut release, Glasskår EP in 2004, was a commercial success, and the titular single "Glasskår" peaked at No. 9 on VG-lista, the Norwegian Albums Chart, becoming certified Gold after remaining on the chart for 6 weeks. Their debut studio album was Rett fra hjertet, released in 2006. It reached No. 10 on VG-lista and sold 18,000 copies. The band got nominated for "Best Album" in Spellemannprisen in 2006 and won the Norwegian Alarmprisen in 2007. Their 2008 album Fire Vegger was an even bigger success. The album sold more than 30,000 copies and reached No. 3 on the Norwegian Albums Chart. Aldri solgt en løgn, their third and biggest album, topped the Norwegian charts and won them the prestigious Spellemannprisen award as "Best Hip Hop album", with the single "Ruter" winning "Best hit of the year". Other accolades for the album included the official Bendiksenprisen award, Sigval Bergesen d.y.'s honorary "Almennyttige Ærespris" award and international recognition as "Best Norwegian Act" in MTV Europe Music Awards in 2010. They were once again the recipients of Spellemannprisen 2012 in the category Pop music, for the album Kors på halsen, ti kniver i hjertet, mor og far i døden. In November 2013 Karpe received the P3 award on the P3 radio station's first music award show, P3 Gull at Sentrum Scene in Oslo.

In October 2015, they launched a brand new musical project called Heisann Montebello. Nine songs were released over two years, each one with their own ambitious music video. The project was awarded the Spellemannprisen 2016 in the categories Best Urban Act and Album of the Year. They were even nominated in the categories Best Songwriter and Best Music Video for "Den islamske elefanten", directed by Thea Hvistendahl.

=== The Monkey & The Mouth ===
The duo went on a Norway tour before they announced that they would play three shows at the Oslo Spektrum Arena in April 2017. All 27,000 tickets were sold in a matter of hours. The three shows turned out to be the core of "The Monkey & The Mouth", a full-length experimental movie directed by Thea Hvistendahl. It was viewed by 52,000 people during its limited four-day theatrical release in December 2017, and revolves around the visual and musical universe created by the band. The music videos for "Heisann Montebello" introduced two characters: The Monkey (Chirag/Entertainment) and the Mouth (Magdi/Art).

The film is a fusion of concert and fiction that together constitutes a "never before seen" hybrid of music video/live-concert/fiction film. "The Monkey and The Mouth" was awarded the Amanda award 2018 and the Kanonprisen at the Norwegian Kosmorama Film Festival in the Production Design category. It was also part of the official selection at the Tallinn Film Festival 2018, CPH PIX Film Festival, Gothenburg Film Festival 2018 and it is appointed critics choice at Tromsø International Film Festival 2019.

=== 2019–2026 ===
In 2019 they released the EP Sas Plus/Sas Pussy. The EP was released as one 29 minutes and 47 seconds long track. They were rewarded Spellemannprisen 2019 in the category Album of the year for their efforts. In addition to this, they were nominated in the categories Urban and Songwriter of the year. In December 2019 they made two huge and very different announcements. They announced ten shows in Oslo Spektrum Arena in August 2021 (postponed to 2022 due to the Covid-19 pandemic), and at the same time they invited 100 lucky fans to an experience called SAS Skien. SAS Skien took place in Festiviteten in the town of Skien, Norway – a historical building with a total of 114 rooms that Karpe bought in 2018.

Everyone that bought a ticket to one of the concerts in Oslo Spektrum, could apply to be part of a one of a kind experience in the mysterious house. In October 2020 a total of 100 fans were invited into Festiviteten in Skien – 20 people each night, for five nights. The details surrounding the experience were kept secret. Media was not allowed inside and all the guests had to leave their cellphones at the door.

August 17, 2020 Karpe established the Patel & Abdelmaguid Foundation. In doing so they gave away their master rights and revenue from all of their previous releases, six studio albums and various EPs and singles, to causes relating to assistance for refugees, asylum seekers or immigrants. There are no specific requirements set for the size or catchment area of the projects that receive funds. Both worldwide projects and small local projects are eligible, as long as its work is carried out in accordance with the Fund's overarching objectives. The first fund allocation took place in March 2022.

In January 2022, they released the film loop Omar Sheriff, and with it presented their new EP.

In August 2022, Karpe sold out Oslo Spektrum 10 times, with a total of 110,000 attendees. The show reached Variety magazine, which compared the duo to Kanye West and The Weeknd.

In 2024, Karpe released "Piya Piya Calling" together with Kaifi Khalil, Delara and dance group the Quick Style, as part of the fifteenth season of Coke Studio Pakistan, the first time the show had collaborated with a Scandinavian act.

On 28 April 2026, Karpe announced on Instagram that they would retire after their final tour in 2028. The same night, they released the archival project OVERTIME/OVERKILL (Vol. 1, 2, 3 & 7), containing 62 tracks.

In the summer of 2026, Karpe organised the festival Karpe World at Ekebergsletta in Oslo on 2–4 July. Tickets sold out within nine minutes when sales opened on 18 September 2025. More than 100,000 people attended the festival over the three days, with around 35,000 attendees each night.

== Awards ==
- 2008: Spellemannprisen in the category "Hip hop", for the album Fire Vegger
- 2010: Spellemannprisen in the category "Spellemann of the Year"
- 2012: Spellemannprisen in the category "Pop music", for the album Kors på halsen, Ti kniver i hjertet, Mor og Far i døden
- 2013: P3 Gull in the category "P3 Prize"
- 2015: Spellemannprisen in the category "Best music video" for the single "Hvite menn som pusher 50"
- 2016: P3 Gull in the category "Live Artist of the Year"
- 2016: P3 Gull in the category "Song of the Year", for the single "Lett å være rebell i kjellerleiligheten din"
- 2016: Spellemannprisen in the category "Urban", for the album Heisann Montebello
- 2016: Spellemannprisen in the category "Album of the Year", for the album Heisann Montebello
- 2017: P3 Gull in the category "Live Artist of the Year"
- 2017: Edvardprisen in the category "Text" for Heisann Montebello
- 2018: Amanda Award in the category "Production Design", for The Monkey & The Mouth
- 2018: Kanonprisen at the Kosmorama Film Festival in the category "Production Design", for The Monkey & The Mouth
- 2019: P3 Gull in the category "Live Artist of the Year"
- 2019: Spellemannprisen in the category "Album of the Year", for the album Sas Plus/Sas Pussy
- 2022: Prøysenprisen
- 2022: P3 Gull in the category "Artist of the Year"
- 2022: P3 Gull in the category "Song of the Year", for "PAF.no"
- 2022: Årets navn ("Name of the Year") from Nettavisen, shared with lawyer Arvid Sjødin
- 2022: Spellemannprisen in the category "Pop music", for the album Omar Sheriff
- 2022: Spellemannprisen in the category "Songwriter of the Year"
- 2022: Spellemannprisen in the category "Lyricist of the Year"
- 2022: Spellemannprisen in the category "Release of the Year", for the album Omar Sheriff
- 2022: Spellemannprisen in the category "Song of the Year", for "PAF.no"
- 2022: Spellemannprisen in the category "Spellemann of the Year"
- 2023: Red Cross Prize (Røde Kors-prisen)
- 2023: Wenche Foss' Honorary Award
- 2024: Annette Thommessen's Honorary Award from NOAS
- 2024: P3 Gull in the category "Song of the Year", for "Piya Piya Calling"
- 2026: Fritt Ord's Honour (Fritt Ords Honnør)

== Popular culture ==
Norway's Gujarati Rockstar, a documentary released in 2023, explores the musical journey and Gujarati roots of Chirag Patel.

== Discography ==
=== Albums ===
Year	Album	Peak position	Certification
Year	Album	NOR	Certification
2006	Rett fra hjertet	10	
2008	Fire vegger	3	IFPI NOR: Platinum
2010	Aldri solgt en løgn	1	
2012	Kors på halsen, ti kniver i hjertet, mor og far i døden	1	IFPI NOR: Platinum
2016	Heisann Montebello	7	
2026	Overtime/Overkill Vol. 1	2	
2026	Overtime/Overkill Vol. 2	18	
2026	Overtime/Overkill Vol. 3	10	
2026	Overtime/Overkill Vol. 7	—	

=== EPs ===
Year	EP	Peak position	Certification
Year	EP	NOR	Certification
2004	Glasskår EP	21	
2019	Sas Plus/Sas Pussy	3	
2022	Omar Sheriff	1	
2022	Mike It Spektrum	—	
2023	Diaspora Dreams	—	

=== Singles ===
Year	Single	Peak position	Certification	Album
Year	Single	NOR	Certification	Album
2004	"Glasskår"	9		Glasskår EP
2006	"Piano"	12		Rett fra hjertet
2008	"Under overflaten"	8		Fire vegger
2008	"Fireogtyvegods"	5		Fire vegger
2008	"Stjerner"	8		Fire vegger
2009	"Vestkantsvartinga"	17		Fire vegger
2010	"Ruter" (featuring Andreas Grega)	2		Aldri solgt en løgn
2012	"Her"	7		Kors på halsen, ti kniver i hjertet, mor og far i døden
2012	"Påfugl" (featuring Yosef Wolde-Mariam)	12		Kors på halsen, ti kniver i hjertet, mor og far i døden
2012	"Toyota'n til Magdi"	20		Kors på halsen, ti kniver i hjertet, mor og far i døden
2015	"Lett å være rebell i kjellerleiligheten din"	3	IFPI NOR: 4× Platinum	Heisann Montebello
2015	"Hvite menn som pusher 50"	8	IFPI NOR: 2× Platinum	Heisann Montebello
2015	"Au pair"	12	IFPI NOR: Platinum	Heisann Montebello
2015	"Hus/hotell/slott brenner"	4	IFPI NOR: Platinum	Heisann Montebello
2016	"Attitudeproblem"	30	IFPI NOR: Platinum	Heisann Montebello
2016	"Gunerius"	13	IFPI NOR: Platinum	Heisann Montebello
2016	"Den islamske elefanten"	—	IFPI NOR: Gold	Heisann Montebello
2017	"Rett i foret"	4		Non-album singles
2017	"Dup-i-dup"	32		Non-album singles
2019	"Skittles"	4	IFPI NOR: 2× Platinum	Non-album singles
2022	"(Åh) Tåmy, Tåmy – Rifla x Sheriff" (with Arif Murakami)	3		Non-album singles
2023	"Trille" (with Jonas Benyoub)	13		Non-album singles
2023	"Meri jaan" (with Omar Sheriff, the Quick Style and Mo Ayn)	13		Non-album singles
2024	"Piya Piya Calling" (with Delara and Kaifi Khalil featuring the Quick Style)	5		Coke Studio Season 15
2025	"Spis din syvende sans"	59		Non-album single
2026	"Karpe4Life"	1		Overtime/Overkill Vol. 7

=== Other charted songs ===
Year	Title	Peak position	Album
Year	Title	NOR	Album
2022	"Iboprofen"	2	Omar Sheriff
2022	"Ibn Adam"	3	Omar Sheriff
2022	"PAF.no"	1	Omar Sheriff
2022	"Salmalaks"	4	Omar Sheriff
2022	"Baraf/Fairuz" (with Jonas Benyoub and Emilie Nicolas featuring Harpreet Bansal)	6	Omar Sheriff
2022	"Kenya" (live from DY Patil Stadium, Mumbai)	3	Omar Sheriff
2022	"TheMostBeautifulShowInTheWorld(RightNow)_v2_020822.wav"	21	Mike It Spektrum
2022	"BigPapaGoat_v4_4130422.wav" (with Jonas Benyoub)	4	Mike It Spektrum

Awards
Preceded by Alexander Rybak	Recipient of the Spellemannprisen as This year's Spellemann; 2010	Succeeded by Jarle Bernhoft
Preceded by Team Me	Recipient of the best Pop band Spellemannprisen; 2012	Succeeded by Real Ones
Preceded by Jeff Wasserman	Recipient of the lyrics Edvardprisen; 2017	Succeeded by –
