= Farouk Al-Kasim =

Norwegian geologist

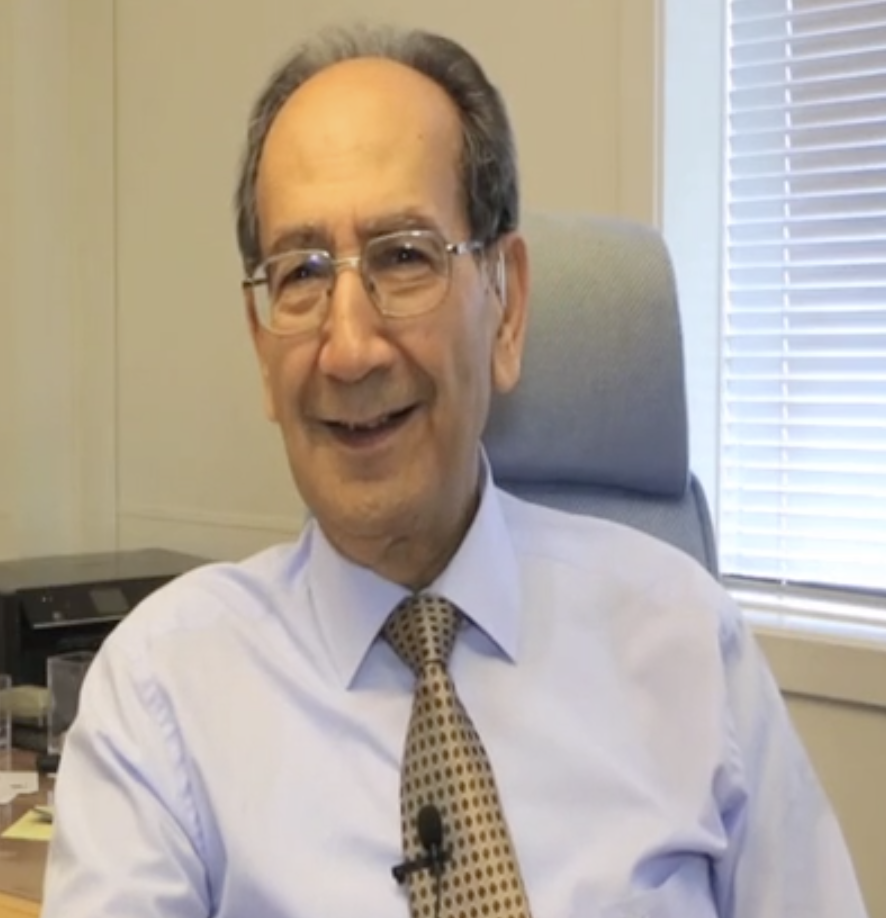
- Born: 8 July 1934 (age 92) or 8 July 1936 (age 90); Basra, Iraq
- Citizenship: Iraqi
- Education: Imperial College London
- Occupation: Petroleum geologist
- Known for: Exploitation of Norway's petroleum resources.

Farouk Al-Kasim (Arabic: فاروق القاسم, 8 July 1934 or 1936) is a Norwegian-Iraqi petroleum geologist. He played a major role in the exploration of Norway's petroleum resources within the Norwegian Petroleum Directorate.

Al-Kasim was decorated Knight 1st Class of the Order of St. Olav in 24 September 2012.

== Biography ==
=== Early life ===
Farouk Abdul Aziz Al-Kasim was born in Basra, Iraq, on 8 July 1934 or 1936. They worked as river guides along the Shatt al-Arab, which gave them the economic leeway to allow Abdul-Aziz Kasim, Farouk's father, the opportunity to focus on his studies; He wanted to live among the privileged and educated population. While in his thirties, Abdul-Aziz married Wafika Yasin, Farouk's mother, when she was 14. Farouk's family were Muslim, but never participated actively in religion, and were tolerant of others' beliefs. Farouk Al-Kasim was circumsized in a synagogue when he was 6, which he described as both terrifying and painful. After the 1941 Iraqi coup d'état, his family sought refuge 30 kilometres south of Basra in Abul-Khasib. After British forces regained control of the country, they moved back to Basra.

Despite clearing the exam for the second grade of primary school, he was put in the first grade. After a few weeks, his teachers allowed him to move forward to the second grade after demonstrating his ability to write and perform calculus. He was bullied by his classmates for his knowledge, which made him want to study harder. Due to often being physically assaulted on his way to school, his father forbade him from playing outside. After being observed nearly being run over by a car after having snuck out, Al-Kasim was beaten by his father. His mother threw herself at him to protect him from the beating.

By the time Al-Kasim was in sixth grade, he had already decided to dedicate himself to studying, because he thought it the only way to get a good education. The year prior, the government had established the King Faisal II College in Baghdad, which had stringent enrollment criteria. He moved to Baghdad when he was eleven after having received the third highest score in the district, which made him eligible for enrollment at the school. After six months of attendance, the school was shut down by the government after it was attacked by nationalists for harbouring socialists. Al-Kasim moved back to Basra, disappointed that his education would not be in English. He studied hard to become eligible for a stipend to study abroad, ending up with the 83rd highest in the country on an examination. He received an invitation to Baghdad to be interviewed before the authorities handed out the stipends. On his way to Baghdad, he decided spontaneously to study geology. At the second round of interviews at the Ministry of Education, there was a representative from the Iraq Petroleum Company. As a stipulation for the stipend, he had to serve ten years in the Iraqi military, once he returned.

=== Studies in England ===
After receiving a stipend of 40 dinar monthly for food, lodging, books, and other supplies, Al-Kasim flew to London for his studies. He stayed at a hotel with two others he had been acquainted with on the plane ride. From London, they travelled to Guildford to study for a General Certificate of Education at Guildford Technical College. After passing an exam, Al-Kasim travelled to London to take the advanced level of the certificate at Chelsea Polytechnic. After a vacation in Iraq, he was accepted into the Royal School of Mines at the Imperial College London. He was one of six students in his class.

In 1956, Al-Kasim was introduced to a woman from Norway, Solfrid Meek. After falling in love with her, he sent a letter to his family in Basra. While his father did not reject their relationship, he asked him to reconsider: "When you get children, they will be torn between two different cultures". In January 1957, they got engaged. On 2 July 1957, the couple were married in London. After Al-Kasim had finished his studies, the two travelled to Åndalsnes, Meek's hometown, during their summer vacation.

=== Return to Iraq ===
After Al-Kasim had finished his petroleum geology studies at the university, he returned to Iraq with his wife. They lived on the outskirts of Basra. Later he started working for the Iraq Petroleum Company. He had three children with his wife in Iraq: two boys and one daughter. After his return to Iraq, he was obligated to serve ten years in the military to pay back his free education in London, but as time went on, he started to become more wary of the government.

=== Life in Norway ===
In 1968, Al-Kasim and his family left Iraq because of their son's medical problems, moving to Oslo, Norway because Norway was the only country to offer the care his son needed; his son had been born with cerebral palsy. In 1968, Norway's Ministry of Industry hired Al-Kasim as a consultant. His job was to analyse the North Sea exploration results. He and his colleagues proposed a white paper giving an important part to state participation. This work led to a law, voted unanimously, and the creation of a Norwegian Petroleum Directorate and a national company, Statoil. 'The Labour government "wanted this to be the new impetus in Norwegian industry.", he says. "And for that to be done properly, according to a socialist, the state has to be in the driving seat". Al-Kasim agreed with that view and landed the job of writing the nation's blueprint for how it would organise its fledgling oil industry.'

He became the director of resource management of the Norwegian Petroleum Directorate and has been given credit for high level of extraction rate of oil from the different fields—45% compared to 25% worldwide, spurring the rate of technological development.
