= Stig Brenner =

Norwegian rapper, singer, and songwriter from Hamar

Unge Ferrari
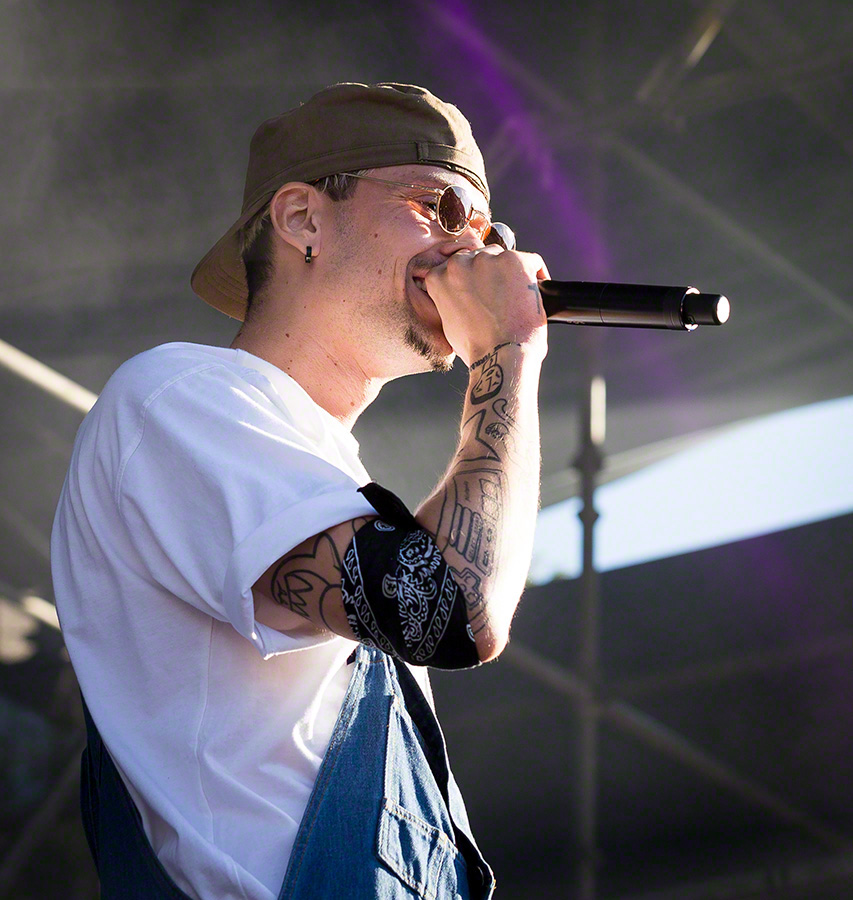
- Unge Ferrari at Stavernfestivalen in 2016.
- Born: Stig Joar Haugen; August 2, 1990 (age 36); Hamar, Innlandet, Norway
- Other names: Ferrari, Stig Brenner
- Education: Hamar Cathedral School
- Occupations: Rapper; singer; songwriter
- Musical career
- Genres: Hip hop; trap; R&B
- Years active: 2015–present
- Labels: Nora Collective; Sony Music

Stig Joar Haugen (born August 2, 1990, in Hamar, Norway), known professionally as Unge Ferrari and Stig Brenner, is a Norwegian rapper, singer, and songwriter. Haugen debuted in 2015 with the EP Til mine venner. It featured the breakthrough singles "Lianer" and "Hvis du vil" with Tomine Harket, and was nominated for Spellemannprisen in the "Urban" category as well as for P3 Gull 2015 in the Newcomer of the Year category.

In 2018 he released the album Midt imellom magisk og manisk, which debuted with atop the Norwegian VG-lista albums chart. For the album, he was nominated for two awards ahead of Spellemannprisen 2018: Songwriter of the Year and Album of the Year. He was also nominated for P3 Gull 2018 in the Live Artist of the Year category.

== Discography ==
=== Studio album ===
| Year | Title | NOR |
|---|---|---|
| 2018 | Midt imellom magisk og manisk | 1 |
| 2021 | Hvite duer, sort magi | 1 |
| 2025 | Slipp meg ut | 10 |

=== EPs ===
| Year | Title | NOR |
|---|---|---|
| 2015 | Til mine venner | — |
| 2016 | Hva er vi nå // H.E.V.N. // (with Tomine Harket) | — |
| 2017 | Romeo må dø | 6 |
| 2022 | BluesBrutterne (with Arif) | — |
| 2023 | Det var aldri meg | — |

=== Singles ===
- "Wollahp" (2015)
- "Bulmers" (2015)
- "Vanilje" (2015)
- "Hvis du vil" (with Tomine Harket) (2015)
- "Scubadive" (2016)
- "BBB" (with Arif) (2017)
- "Du bestemmer" (with Arif) (2017)
- "Hologram" (2017)
- "Urettferdig" (2017)
- "D&G" (2017)
- "Ashanti" (2017)
- "Sorry mamma" (with Arif) (2018)
- "Tunaraha" (with Arif) (2018)
- "Ung & dum" (2018)
- "Balkong" (2018)
- "Bagasje" (with Ylva Olaisen) (2018)
- "Privat" (2019)
- "3 shots" (2019)
- "Siste sjans" (with Newkid) (2019)
