= P3 Gull =

Norwegian music award show

- Awarded for: Excellence in music
- Country: Norway
- Presented by: NRK P3
- First award: 29 November 2013; 12 years ago
- Website: Official website

Television/radio coverage
- Network: NRK

P3 Gull (in English: "P3 Gold") is a music show and an award ceremony organized by the Norwegian radio station NRK P3. P3 Gold was first held on 29 November 2013 at Sentrum Scene in Oslo, offering awards in four categories: "Newcomer of the Year" (Årets nykommer), "Live Artist of the Year" (Årets liveartist), "Song of the Year" (Årets låt) and "P3-Prize" (P3-prisen). The live shows will primarily be a meeting between the audience and the music being played on P3.

The program has won six "Professional Awards" under Gullruten: class for best directing multi-camera three times (2014, 2015 and 2016); all by Nicolai Sørensen, Best Cinematography twice (2014, 2016); Henning Våge and Mats Lian and "Best Sound Design", "Art Direction", "Production design" in 2016 by Audun Stjernstad and Joakim Faxvaag.

== Prize winners ==
=== P3 Gull 2013 ===
- Årets nykommer: Cashmere Cat
- Årets liveartist: Kaizers Orchestra
- Årets låt: "Running to The Sea" – Röyksopp and Susanne Sundfør
- P3-prisen: Karpe Diem

Arranged on November 29, 2013 Sentrum Scene in Oslo where Live Nelvik hosted as presenter.

=== P3 Gull 2014 ===
- Årets nykommer: Kygo
- Årets liveartist: OnklP & De fjerne slekningene
- Årets låt: "Styggen på ryggen" – OnklP & De fjerne slekningene
- P3-prisen: Susanne Sundfør

Arranged on November 29, 2014, at H3 Arena in Oslo where Live Nelvik hosted as presenter.

=== P3 Gull 2015 ===
- Årets nykommer: Astrid S
- Årets liveartist: Honningbarna
- Årets låt: "2 AM" – Astrid S
- P3-prisen: Lars Vaular

Arranged on November 28, 2015, at H3 Arena in Oslo where Christine Dancke and Leo Ajkic hosted as presenters.

=== P3 Gull 2016 ===
- Årets nykommer: Cezinando
- Årets liveartist: Karpe Diem
- Årets låt: "Lett å være rebell i kjellerleiligheten din" – Karpe Diem
- P3-prisen: Röyksopp

Arranged on November 26, 2016, at the Central in Oslo where Live Nelvik and Ronny Brede Aase hosted as presenters.

=== P3 Gull 2017 ===
- Årets nykommer: Sigrid
- Årets liveartist: Karpe Diem
- Årets låt: "Håper du har plass" – Cezinando
- P3-prisen: OnklP

Arranged on November 25, 2017, at Skur 13, Tjuvholmen in Oslo where Live Nelvik and Leo Ajkic hosted as presenters.

Other nominees:

- Årets nykommer: Hkeem, Kjartan Lauritzen, Amanda Delara, inda Vidala
- Årets liveartist: Gabrielle, Kjartan Lauritzen, Sigrid, Lüt
- Årets låt: Linda Vidala and KingSkurkOne – "Bængshot", Sigrid – "Don't Kill My Vibe", Arif – "Alene", Hkeem and Temur – "Fy faen"

=== P3 Gull 2018 ===
- Årets nykommer: Boy Pablo
- Årets liveartist: Cezinando
- Årets låt: "Strangers" – Sigrid
- P3-prisen: Ina Wroldsen

Arranged on November 24, 2018, at Skur 13, Tjuvholmen in Oslo where Herman Flesvig hosted as presenter.

Other nominees:

- Årets nykommer: Halie, Myra, Virkelig, Ruben
- Årets liveartist: Sigrid, Arif and Unge Ferrari, Fieh, Kjartan Lauritzen
- Årets låt: Seeb and Dagny – "Drink About", Ina Wroldsen – "Strongest", Cezinando and Chirag – "Er dette alt", Emilie Nicolas – "Feel Fine"

=== P3 Gull 2019 ===
- Årets nykommer: Isah
- Årets liveartist: Karpe
- Årets låt: "Hallo" – Isah and Dutty Dior
- P3-prisen: Kygo

Arranged on November 30, 2019, at Malersalen, NRK Marienlyst in Oslo where Ronny Brede Aase hosted as presenter.

Other nominees:

- Årets nykommer: SKAAR, ISÁK, Girl in Red, Emma Steinbakken
- Årets liveartist: Pasha, Brenn., Sondre Justad, L.U:N.A
- Årets låt: Sondre Justad – "Fontena på Youngstorget", Karpe – "Sas Pussy", Sigrid – "Don't Feel Like Crying", Arif – "Hvem er hun"

=== P3 Gull 2020 ===
- Årets nykommer: Musti
- Årets artist: Girl in Red
- Årets låt: "Somebody" – Dagny
- P3-prisen: Gabrielle

Arranged on November 28, 2020, at the old Deichman Library with Jonis Josef, Henrik Farley and Martin Lepperød as presenters.

Other nominees:

- Årets nykommer: Kamara, Sebastian Zalo, B-Boy Myhre, and Zupermaria
- Årets artist: Dagny, Boy Pablo, Ruben, Astrid S
- Årets låt: "Kiss somebody" - Julie Bergan + Seeb, "Nå er det oss" - Amanda Delara, "Hey Girl" - Boy Pablo and "Dance" - CLMD and Tungevaag

== Interval act ==
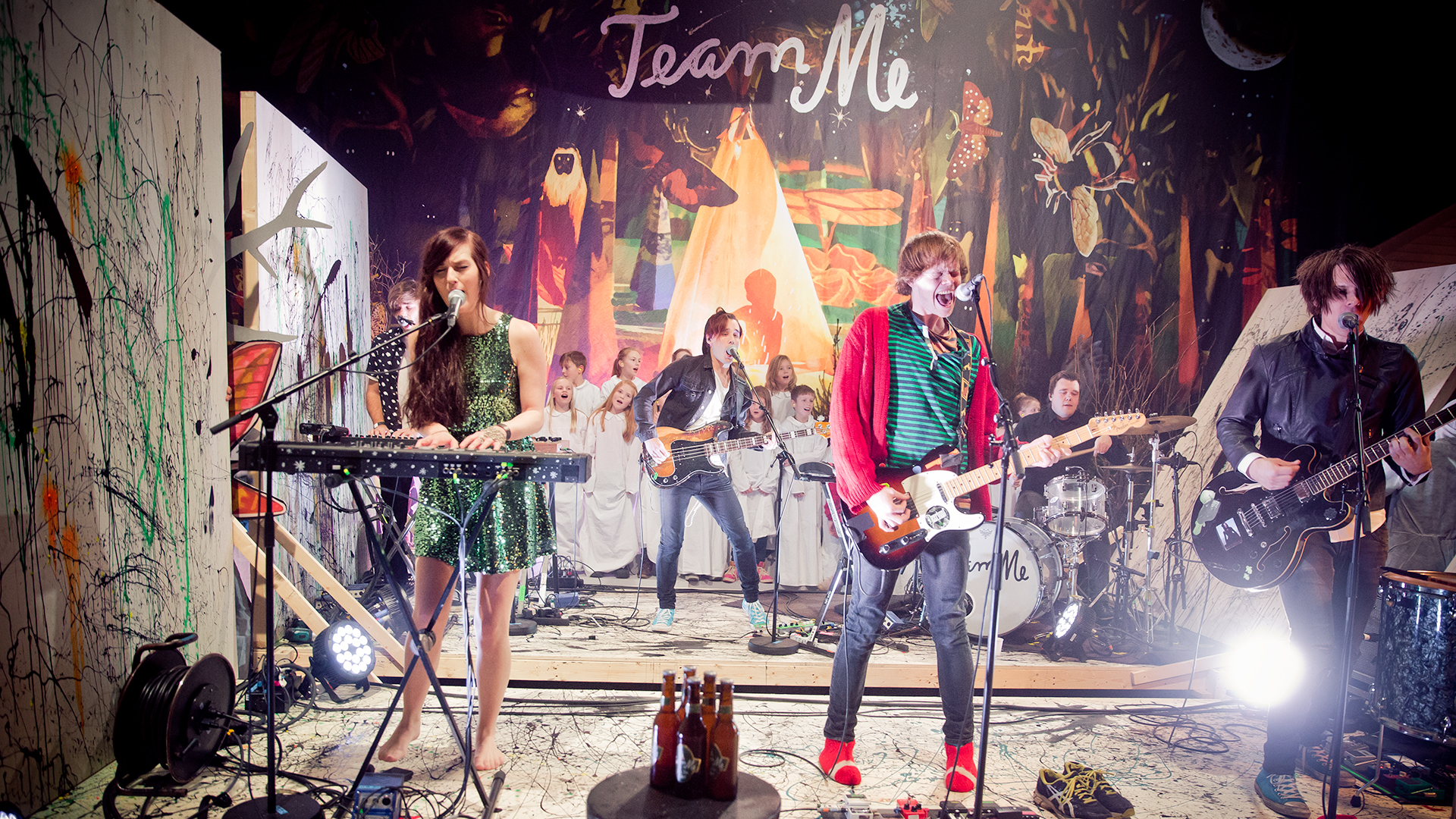
Band Team Me live at P3 Gull 2014

=== 2013 ===
- Nico & Vinz – "Am I Wrong"
- Truls – "Out of Yourself"
- Emilie Nicolas – "Pstereo"
- Lars Vaular with Arif and Kaveh
- CLMD – "Stockholm Syndrome"
- Kvelertak – "Kvelertak"
- Karpe Diem – "Jens"

=== 2014 ===
- Highasakite – "Lover, Where Do You Live?"
- Gabrielle – "5 fine frøkner"
- Team Me – "F is For Faker"
- Sondre Justad – "Nu har du mæ"
- Marit Larsen – "I Don't Want to Talk About It"
- Susanne Sundfør – "Fade Away"
- Röyksopp with Jamie Irrepressible – "I Had This Thing"

=== 2015 ===
- Act 1: Karpe Diem – "Hvite menn som pusher 50"
- Act 2: Lemaitre feat. Jennie A. – "Closer"
- Act 3: Carl Louis feat. Ary – "Telescope"
- Act 4: OnklP & De fjerne slekningene – "B-film"
- Act 5: Daniel Kvammen – "Du fortenar ein som meg"
- Act 6: Aurora – "Running with the Wolves"
- Act 7: Nico & Vinz – "That's How You Know"

=== 2016 ===
- Act 1: Alan Walker with Ingrid Helene Håvik – "Faded"
- Act 2: Dagny with Kristian Kristensen – "Fool's Gold"
- Act 3: Astrid S with dePresno – "Hurts So Good"
- Act 4: Cezinando – "Botanisk hage"
- Act 5: Julie Bergan – "Arigato"
- Act 6: Matoma with Becky Hill – "False Alarm"

=== 2017 ===
- Act 1: Cezinando – "Håper du har plass"
- Act 2: Sigrid – "Don't Kill My Vibe"
- Act 3: Arif – "Alene"
- Act 4: Linda Vidala and KingSkurkOne – "Bængshot"
- Act 5: Sondre Justad – "Paradis"
- Act 6: Hkeem and Temur – "Fy faen"

=== 2018 ===
- Sigrid – "Sucker Punch"
- EMIR – "10 ting"
- Unge Ferrari – "Balkong"
- Girl in Red – "I Wanna Be Your Girlfriend"
- Dagny – "Used To You"
- Emilie Nicolas – "Feel Fine"
- Astrid S – "Emotion"

== Awards and nominations ==
| Year | Organization | Category | Nominee(s) | Result | Ref. |
|---|---|---|---|---|---|
| 2017 | Gullruten | Best event or sports broadcasting | —N/a | Won | |

== See also ==
- P3 Gold Awards – Swedish equivalent
