= Gunnhild Sundli =

Norwegian musical artist (born 1985)

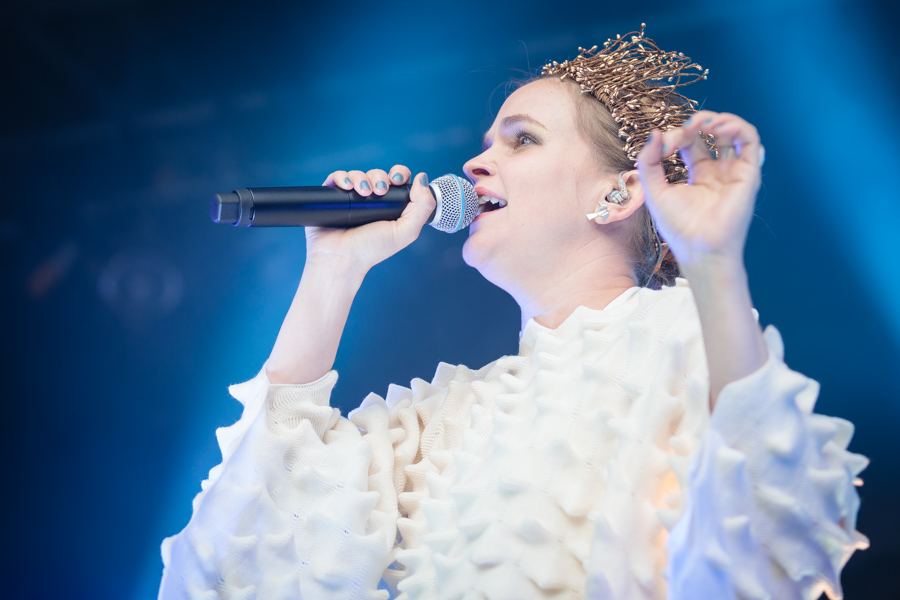
- Gunnhild Sundli performing in 2018

Background information
- Born: Gunnhild Eide Sundli; 2 July 1985 (age 41); Orkdal Municipality, Sør-Trøndelag
- Origin: Norway
- Genres: Traditional folk music, rock
- Occupations: Musician, actor
- Instrument: Vocals
- Label: EMI Music Norway
- Member of: Gåte

Gunnhild Eide Sundli (born 2 July 1985) is a Norwegian musical artist. She was born and raised in Orkdal Municipality, Norway and now resides in Trondheim.

== Career ==
Sundli started to "kvede" (a traditional Norwegian singing tradition) as a nine-year-old, and has since also been singing classical and jazz. She studied "kveding" at Heimdal videregående skole (high school).

Sundli is best known as the singer of the band Gåte from 1999 until the band took a break in 2005. In 2017 Gåte returned with a new EP and a full-length album in 2019.

In February 2006 she started her acting career with her debut in the cabaret Cafe Isogaisa by Hans Rotmo, and continued in June in the role as Anna in Korsvikaspillet in Trondheim. In August she played Lucie in the opera about Olav Engelbrektsson on Steinvikholmen, before she participated in the historical play Raud Vinter in Levanger Municipality in September. In 2007 she acted in Ibsen's Villanden, at Trøndelag Teater, and she also played the main character Maren in the historical play Maren Dømt til Døden in Hitra Municipality the same year. In 2024, Gåte won Melodi Grand Prix, Norway's selection show for the Eurovision Song Contest, with their song "Ulveham". They made it to the Grand Final of Eurovision 2024, where they finished 25th.

Sundli released her debut solo album Tankerop in 2013.

== Discography ==
=== Solo albums ===
- 2013: Tankerop (EMI)

=== Collaborations ===
Within Gåte

- 2000: Gåte
- 2002: Jygri (Warner Elektra Atlantic)
- 2003: Statt opp (Maggeduliadei)
- 2004: Iselilja (Warner Elektra Atlantic)
- 2006: Liva (Warner Elektra Atlantic), live
- 2017: Attersyn
- 2019: Svevn
- 2022: Nord
- 2024: Ulveham

With Aasmund Nordstoga

- 2015: Sæle Jolekveld
