= Norway in the Eurovision Song Contest 2026 =

- Eurovision Song Contest 2026
- Participating broadcaster: Norwegian Broadcasting Corporation (NRK)
- Country: Norway
- Selection process: Melodi Grand Prix 2026
- Selection date: 28 February 2026

Competing entry
- Song: "Ya Ya Ya"
- Artist: Jonas Lovv
- Songwriters: Jonas Lovv Hellesøy; Sondre Skaftun

Placement
- Semi-final result: Qualified (4th, 206 points)
- Final result: 14th, 134 points

Participation chronology

Norway was represented at the Eurovision Song Contest 2026 with the song "Ya Ya Ya", written by Jonas Lovv Hellesøy and Sondre Skaftun, and performed by Jonas Lovv. The Norwegian participating broadcaster, the Norwegian Broadcasting Corporation (NRK), organised the national final Melodi Grand Prix 2026 in order to select its entry for the contest.

== Background ==
Prior to the 2026 contest, the Norwegian Broadcasting Corporation (NRK) had participated in the Eurovision Song Contest representing Norway sixty-four times since its first entry in 1960. It had won the contest on three occasions: in 1985 with the song "La det swinge" performed by Bobbysocks!, in 1995 with the song "Nocturne" performed by Secret Garden, and in 2009 with the song "Fairytale" performed by Alexander Rybak. Norway also had the two dubious distinctions of having finished last in the Eurovision final more than any other country and for having received nul points (zero points) four times, the latter being a record shared with Austria. The country had finished last eleven times and had failed to score a point during four contests. Following the introduction of semi-finals for 2004, Norway has finished in the top ten ten times.

As part of its duties as participating broadcaster, NRK organises the selection of its entry in the Eurovision Song Contest and broadcasts the event in the country. The broadcaster has traditionally organised the national final Melodi Grand Prix, which has selected its entry for the Eurovision Song Contest in all but one of its participation. NRK confirmed its intentions to participate at the 2026 Eurovision Song Contest on 19 June 2025, and announced on 20 June the organization of Melodi Grand Prix 2026 in order to select its 2026 entry.

== Before Eurovision ==
=== Melodi Grand Prix 2026 ===
Melodi Grand Prix 2026 was the 64th edition of the Norwegian national final Melodi Grand Prix (MGP), which selected Norway's entry for the Eurovision Song Contest 2026. The show took place on 28 February 2026 at the Håkons Hall in Lillehammer, hosted by Ronny Brede Aase, Marte Stokstad and Markus Neby. The national final was watched by 605,000 viewers in Norway with a market share of 56.4%, making it the least watched edition of MGP ever.

==== Format ====
The competition consisted of two stages. The first stage was a radio selection titled MGP-cupen ("MGP cup"), which took place between 20 and 26 January 2026 during the NRK P1 programme Nitimen. Eight songs competed over three rounds of duels and the winning entry qualified to the second stage, which was the final, on 28 February 2026, joining the eight pre-qualified finalists. The results of MGP-cupen were determined exclusively by public online voting through NRK's official website nrk.no, while viewers could also cast their votes online through nrk.no during the final.

==== Competing entries ====
A submission period was opened by NRK between 20 June and 1 September 2025. Each song had to have at least one Norwegian songwriter, and each songwriter could submit a maximum of three songs. In addition to the public call for submissions, NRK directly invited certain artists and composers to submit songs. At the close of the deadline, approximately 1,500 submissions were received. A total of 16 songs were selected for the competition by the newly assigned MGP music producer Tarjei Strøm: eight songs for MGP-cupen and an additional eight songs that qualified directly for the final. The directly qualified competing acts and songs were revealed on 19 January 2026 during a press conference at NRK's studio 1, presented by Ronny Brede Aase, Marte Stokstad and Markus Neby, while the acts competing in MGP-cupen were revealed on 20 January 2026. Due to Israel's participation in Eurovision amidst the Gaza war, Ylvis withdrew prior to the announcement of the participants despite having been selected to compete. Among the competing artists were Alexander Rybak, who won the 2009 contest for Norway and represented the country again in 2018, and Emmy, who represented Ireland in 2025.

Artist	Song	Songwriter(s)
Alexander Rybak	"Rise"	Alexander Rybak
Aranja	"Pyjamas Song"	Aranja Gharib; Christopher Scott Simmons; Ola Frøyen; Sonia Maselik
Emma	"Northern Lights"	Andreas Lindbergh; Emma Gunnarsen; Jimmy "Joker" Thörnfeldt; Joy Deb; Linnea Deb
Emmy	"Sykt fin"	Andreas Johansson; Ben Adams; Emmy Kristine Guttulsrud Kristiansen
Gothminister	"The Spell"	Bjørn Alexander Brem
Hedda Mae	"Snap Back"	Benjamin Giørtz; Dag Holtan-Hartwig; Glen Roberts; Halvor Folstad; Hedda Grønhaug
Jonas Lovv	"Ya Ya Ya"	Jonas Lovv Hellesøy; Sondre Skaftun
Leonardo Amor	"Prayer"	Ådne Perry Kjellstadli; Adrian Søfteland Midtgard; Leonardo Amorsolo; Lillian Slåbakk; Mathias Nilsen
Mileo	"Frankenstein"	Audun Agnar Guldbrandsen; Farida Louise Bolseth Benounis; Miles Curtis Sesselmann
Raylee	"Where Did Your Friend Go"	Celine Solemsløkk Helgemo; Emma Gale; Raylee Charlotte Kristiansen; Steven Rodriguez
Sander Silva and Victorjus	"Fritt fall"	Sander Gran; Stine Øen; Torjus Fluge Fornes; Trym Olstad
Silke	"Forevermore"	Audun Agnar Guldbrandsen; Hannah Theuma; Patrik Jean; Silje Montsko Blandkjenn
Skrellex	"Into the Wild"	Camilo Fernández; Kai Thomas Ryen Larsen; Michael James Down; Primož Poglajen; Will Taylor
Storm	"Lullaby"	Erlend Torheim; Jonas Wesetrud Hansen; Leo Davadi Sundli; Martin Stenstad Selen; Nora Eklo
Thomas Jenssen	"Smalltown"	Carl-Henrik Wahl; Jakob Mihoubi; Rudy Daouk; Simon Peyron; Thomas Jenssen
Vika Anonymous	"Har du itte vørri på toten før?"	Chris Tsika Kabala; Gustav Fredholm; Jørgen Ulsrud; Kjersti Sleveland; Torgeir Ryssevik

==== MGP-cupen ====
MGP-cupen took place between 20 and 26 January 2026 and consisted of three rounds of public voting. The first round featured four daily duels between 20 and 24 January 2026 and the winners of the duels proceeded to the second round which featured two daily duels on 24 and 25 January 2026. The winners of each duel proceeded to the last round on 26 January 2026, where the winner, "Into the Wild" performed by Skrellex, proceeded to the final.

On 25 January 2026, Sander Silva and Victorjus announced their withdrawal from the competition, also citing Israel's participation in Eurovision amidst the Gaza war as the reason.

First round – 20–23 January 2026
Duel	Date	Artist	Song	Result
I	20 January	Skrellex	"Into the Wild"	Advanced
I	20 January	Emmy	"Sykt fin"	—N/a
II	21 January	Gothminister	"The Spell"	Advanced
II	21 January	Vika Anonymous	"Har du itte vørri på toten før?"	—N/a
III	22 January	Aranja	"Pyjamas Song"	—N/a
III	22 January	Sander Silva and Victorjus	"Fritt fall"	Advanced
IV	23 January	Raylee	"Where Did Your Friend Go"	Advanced
IV	23 January	Thomas Jenssen	"Smalltown"	—N/a

Second round – 24–25 January 2026
Duel	Date	Artist	Song	Result
I	24 January	Skrellex	"Into the Wild"	Advanced
I	24 January	Gothminister	"The Spell"	—N/a
II	25 January	Sander Silva and Victorjus	"Fritt fall"	Withdrew
II	25 January	Raylee	"Where Did Your Friend Go"	Advanced

Final round – 26 January 2026
Artist	Song	Result
Raylee	"Where Did Your Friend Go"	—N/a
Skrellex	"Into the Wild"	Advanced

==== Final ====
Eight pre-qualified entries and the winner of MGP-cupen competed in the final, held on 28 February 2026. The winner, "Ya Ya Ya" performed by Jonas Lovv, was selected by a combination of a public vote (60%) and votes from eight international juries (40%). The viewers had a total of 516 points to award, while the juries had a total of 344 points to award. Each jury group distributed their points as follows: 1, 2, 4, 6, 8, 10 and 12 points. The viewer vote was based on the percentage of votes each song achieved. For example, if a song gained 10% of the viewer vote, then that entry would be awarded 10% of 516 points rounded to the nearest integer: 52 points. In addition to the performances of the competing entries, the show was opened by Kyle Alessandro, who represented Norway in 2025, performing his entry "Lighter".

Final – 28 February 2026
R/O	Artist	Song	Jury	Televote	Total	Place
1	Skrellex	"Into the Wild"	15	30	45	7
2	Hedda Mae	"Snap Back"	11	4	15	8
3	Storm	"Lullaby"	14	36	50	6
4	Mileo	"Frankenstein"	54	35	89	4
5	Silke	"Forevermore"	0	4	4	9
6	Alexander Rybak	"Rise"	66	126	192	2
7	Emma	"Northern Lights"	28	99	127	3
8	Leonardo Amor	"Prayer"	60	13	73	5
9	Jonas Lovv	"Ya Ya Ya"	96	169	265	1

Detailed international jury votes
R/O	Song	Switzerland	Sweden	Armenia	United Kingdom	Estonia	Croatia	Belgium	Denmark	Total
R/O	Song	Switzerland	Sweden	Armenia	United Kingdom	Estonia	Croatia	Belgium	Denmark	Total
1	"Into the Wild"	4			1	1	1	2	6	15
2	"Snap Back"	2	1	2	2	2			2	11
3	"Lullaby"		2	4	4		2	1	1	14
4	"Frankenstein"	10	8	6	10	6	4	10		54
5	"Forevermore"									0
6	"Rise"	6	10	8	8	8	8	8	10	66
7	"Northern Lights"	1	6	1		4	6	6	4	28
8	"Prayer"	8	4	10	6	10	10	4	8	60
9	"Ya Ya Ya"	12	12	12	12	12	12	12	12	96

International jury members and spokespersons
Country	Jury members
Armenia	Anush Ter-Ghukasyan; Arthur Manukyan; David Tserunyan (jury leader); Lilit Navasardyan; Pargev Vardanyan (spokesperson)
Belgium	Elia Rose; Jean-Luc Fonck; Jonatan Cerrada Moreno (spokesperson); Lou Vanden Abeelen; Michaël De Lil (jury leader)
Croatia	Luka Grgić; Maja Tokic; Robert Urlic; Tomislav Stengl (jury leader); Zlata Mück Sušec (spokesperson)
Denmark	Anders Ugilt Andersen; Bryan Rice; Molly Plank (jury leader and spokesperson); Ralf Richardt Strøbech; Tilde Vinther
Estonia	Alice Aleksandridi; Karl Killing; Mihkel Sirelpuu; Riin Vann (jury leader and spokesperson)
Sweden	Malin Wiklund; Mathias Bridfelt; Natalie Carrion (jury leader and spokesperson); Natasha Azarmi; Robert Sehlberg
Switzerland	Adrian Graf; Gian Rosen; Leonie Meier; Nadine Schärer; Nina Mathys (jury leader and spokesperson)
United Kingdom	Andrew Cartmell (jury leader); Curtis Thewlis; Lindsay Dracass (spokesperson); Robin Wallington; Tim Woodcock

== At Eurovision ==
In January, Norway was drawn to compete in the second half of the second semi-final.

On May 14, 2026, Jonas Lovv took the stage for Norway, performing his song "Ya Ya Ya" in the second semi-final. He qualified for the Grand Final.

On May 16, 2026, Lovv performed 23rd in the Grand Final. He secured a total of 134 points (115 jury points and 19 public points), placing Norway in 14th place.

=== Voting ===
==== Points awarded to Norway ====
Points awarded to Norway (Semi-final 2)
Score	Televote	Jury
12 points	Denmark	Austria; Czechia; France; United Kingdom
10 points	Australia; Latvia; Ukraine	
8 points	Albania; Romania	Switzerland
7 points	Czechia	Armenia; Australia; Bulgaria; Luxembourg
6 points	Austria; Bulgaria; Malta; United Kingdom	Latvia
5 points	Switzerland	Albania; Romania
4 points		Cyprus
3 points	Cyprus	Malta
2 points		Ukraine
1 point		

Points awarded to Norway (Final)
Score	Televote	Jury
12 points		France
10 points	Denmark	Albania; Czechia; Estonia
8 points		
7 points		Belgium; Lithuania
6 points	Ukraine	Armenia; Australia; Moldova
5 points		Georgia; Romania; Serbia; Switzerland
4 points		Luxembourg; United Kingdom
3 points		Austria; Bulgaria; Poland
2 points	Australia	Malta; Portugal
1 point	Sweden	

==== Points awarded by Norway ====
Points awarded by Norway (Semi-final 2)
Score	Televote	Jury
12 points	Denmark	Denmark
10 points	Bulgaria	Australia
8 points	Albania	Romania
7 points	Romania	Czechia
6 points	Ukraine	Bulgaria
5 points	Australia	Cyprus
4 points	Malta	Albania
3 points	Latvia	Ukraine
2 points	Czechia	Armenia
1 point	Switzerland	Malta

Points awarded by Norway (Final)
Score	Televote	Jury
12 points	Denmark	Denmark
10 points	Finland	France
8 points	Bulgaria	Finland
7 points	Romania	Australia
6 points	Australia	Romania
5 points	Israel	Italy
4 points	Sweden	Sweden
3 points	Albania	Bulgaria
2 points	Ukraine	Czechia
1 point	France	Israel

==== Detailed voting results ====
Each participating broadcaster assembles a seven-member jury panel consisting of music industry professionals who are citizens of the country they represent and two of which have to be between 18 and 25 years old. Each jury, and individual jury member, is required to meet a strict set of criteria regarding professional background, as well as diversity in gender and age. No member of a national jury was permitted to be related in any way to any of the competing acts in such a way that they cannot vote impartially and independently. The individual rankings of each jury member as well as the nation's televoting results were released shortly after the grand final.

The following members comprised the Norwegian jury:

- Daniel Grindeland
- Jørn Kristian Dahl
- Kevin Haugan
- Hanne Sørvaag
- Ingrid Vårvik
- Janne Monsen Tveit
- Regina Tucker (Myra)

Detailed voting results from Norway (Semi-final 2)
R/O	Country	Jury									Televote	
R/O	Country	Juror A	Juror B	Juror C	Juror D	Juror E	Juror F	Juror G	Rank	Points	Rank	Points
01	Bulgaria	5	6	5	3	8	8	3	5	6	2	10
02	Azerbaijan	12	14	11	13	12	13	7	13		14	
03	Romania	3	2	14	2	9	7	5	3	8	4	7
04	Luxembourg	14	11	9	11	13	4	4	12		11	
05	Czechia	9	10	2	5	4	10	2	4	7	9	2
06	Armenia	4	7	7	7	10	6	12	9	2	13	
07	Switzerland	6	12	8	10	7	5	11	11		10	1
08	Cyprus	7	3	6	6	5	14	13	6	5	12	
09	Latvia	11	9	12	14	14	12	14	14		8	3
10	Denmark	1	1	1	1	1	1	1	1	12	1	12
11	Australia	2	5	4	4	2	9	9	2	10	6	5
12	Ukraine	8	8	10	8	11	2	6	8	3	5	6
13	Albania	10	4	3	12	6	11	8	7	4	3	8
14	Malta	13	13	13	9	3	3	10	10	1	7	4
15	Norway											

Detailed voting results from Norway (Final)
R/O	Country	Jury									Televote	
R/O	Country	Juror A	Juror B	Juror C	Juror D	Juror E	Juror F	Juror G	Rank	Points	Rank	Points
01	Denmark	3	6	1	2	1	1	1	1	12	1	12
02	Germany	21	16	17	22	13	11	9	17		22	
03	Israel	9	7	16	10	5	2	15	10	1	6	5
04	Belgium	19	23	24	19	20	15	19	23		23	
05	Albania	6	15	12	13	14	7	22	13		8	3
06	Greece	22	13	10	17	8	16	11	15		14	
07	Ukraine	12	19	15	7	12	5	10	12		9	2
08	Australia	4	14	7	6	3	3	6	4	7	5	6
09	Serbia	20	21	18	21	18	14	24	22		15	
10	Malta	23	17	14	12	21	17	14	20		18	
11	Czechia	1	11	20	5	15	6	12	9	2	19	
12	Bulgaria	13	12	6	8	4	4	7	8	3	3	8
13	Croatia	7	22	13	15	19	18	23	18		16	
14	United Kingdom	15	18	22	18	22	19	16	21		21	
15	France	2	2	11	1	2	10	20	2	10	10	1
16	Moldova	8	10	8	23	24	23	17	16		12	
17	Finland	14	3	3	3	9	9	4	3	8	2	10
18	Poland	5	5	21	20	17	21	18	14		11	
19	Lithuania	17	24	19	24	23	24	21	24		17	
20	Sweden	18	9	5	4	7	13	3	7	4	7	4
21	Cyprus	16	4	4	11	10	20	8	11		20	
22	Italy	10	1	9	14	6	12	5	6	5	13	
23	Norway											
24	Romania	24	8	2	9	11	8	2	5	6	4	7
25	Austria	11	20	23	16	16	22	13	19		24	
