= Norway in the Eurovision Song Contest 2025 =

- Eurovision Song Contest 2025
- Participating broadcaster: Norwegian Broadcasting Corporation (NRK)
- Country: Norway
- Selection process: Melodi Grand Prix 2025
- Selection date: 15 February 2025

Competing entry
- Song: "Lighter"
- Artist: Kyle Alessandro
- Songwriters: Kyle Alessandro; Adam Woods

Placement
- Semi-final result: Qualified (8th, 82 points)
- Final result: 18th, 89 points

Participation chronology

Norway was represented at the Eurovision Song Contest 2025 with the song "Lighter", written by Kyle Alessandro and Adam Woods, and performed by Alessandro himself. The Norwegian participating broadcaster, the Norwegian Broadcasting Corporation (NRK), organised the national final Melodi Grand Prix 2025 in order to select its entry for the contest.

== Background ==
Prior to the 2025 contest, the Norwegian Broadcasting Corporation (NRK) had participated in the Eurovision Song Contest representing Norway sixty-three times since its first entry in 1960. It had won the contest on three occasions: in 1985 with the song "La det swinge" performed by Bobbysocks!, in 1995 with the song "Nocturne" performed by Secret Garden, and in 2009 with the song "Fairytale" performed by Alexander Rybak. Norway also had the two dubious distinctions of having finished last in the Eurovision final twelve times, more than any other country, including in 2024 with the song "Ulveham" performed by Gåte, and for having received nul points (zero points) four times, the latter being a record shared with Austria. Following the introduction of semi-finals for 2004, it had finished in the top ten ten times.

As part of its duties as participating broadcaster, NRK organises the selection of its entry in the Eurovision Song Contest and broadcasts the event in the country. NRK confirmed its intention to participate in the 2025 contest on 3 July 2024, announcing on 6 August that its representative would continue to be selected through the national final Melodi Grand Prix, which had selected its entry for the Eurovision Song Contest in all but one of its participations.

== Before Eurovision ==
=== Melodi Grand Prix 2025 ===
Melodi Grand Prix 2025 was the 63rd edition of Melodi Grand Prix (MGP) and selected Norway's entry for the Eurovision Song Contest 2025. The competition took place on 15 February 2025 at the Oslo Spektrum in Oslo, hosted by Markus Neby, Marte Stokstad and Tete Lidbom. The show was televised on NRK1 and with sign language interpretation on NRK Tegnspråk as well as streamed online on NRK TV. The national final was watched by 832,000 viewers in Norway.

==== Competing entries ====
A submission period was opened by NRK between 6 August 2024 and 1 September 2024. Songwriters of any nationality were allowed to submit a maximum of three songs, however, NRK encouraged entries to have at least one Norwegian songwriter. In addition to the public call for submissions, NRK directly invited certain artists and composers to compete, while songwriting camps (the earliest of which was held between 26 and 30 June 2024 in Rena) were held to create potential entries for the competition. Ten songs were selected from all of the received submissions by then-MGP project manager and music producer Stig Karlsen by October 2024, however, two of the artists were later withdrawn from the competition: Angelina Jordan (due to the wildfires around Los Angeles where she is based) and Lavrans Svendsen. Sondrey was subsequently selected as a replacement act. The nine competing acts and songs were revealed on 16 January 2025 during a press conference at NRK's Studio 1, presented by Marte Stokstad, Tete Lidbom and Markus Neby. Short clips of the competing entries were released during the press conference, while the songs in their entirety were premiered on 24 January.

Among the competing artists were former Eurovision Song Contest entrants Bobbysocks!, which won the contest for Norway in 1985, and Wig Wam which represented the country in 2005. The two members of Bobbysocks!, Elisabeth Andreassen and Hanne Krogh, have also competed in the contest separately: Andreassen representing Sweden in 1982 (as a member of the group Chips), as well as representing Norway in 1994 (alongside Jan Werner Danielsen) and in 1996; and Krogh representing Norway in 1991 as a member of the group Just 4 Fun. Other past MGP participants included Kyle Alessandro (as part of Umami Tsunami), Nora Jabri, Tone Damli, and Sondrey.

| Artist | Song | Songwriter(s) |
|---|---|---|
| Bobbysocks! | "Joyful" | Elisabeth Andreassen; Hanne Krogh |
| Kyle Alessandro | "Lighter" | Kyle Alessandro; Adam Woods |
| Ladybug | "Hot as Hell in Paradise" | Iris Severine Mikalsen; Jonas Holteberg Jensen; Anderz Wrethov; Thomas Stengaard |
| LLL | "Parasite" | Olli Äkräs; Nora Foss al-Jabri; Ben Adams; Jim Bergsted |
| Nataleen | "The Game" | Madeleine "Nataleen" Tverberg; Julie Aagaard; Henning Olerud; Stanley Ferdinandez; Kjersti Sleveland |
| Nora Jabri | "Sulale" | Emma Louise Gale; Ovidiu Jacobsen; Ola Frøyen; Nora Foss al-Jabri |
| Sondrey | "Vagabond" | Sondre Mulongo Nystrøm; Magnus Emaka Einang |
| Tone Damli | "Last Song" | Sophie Alexandra Tweed-Simmons; Kristoffer Tømmerbakke; Erik Smaaland; Yoshi Breen |
| Wig Wam | "Human Fire" | Åge Sten Nilsen; Trond Holter; Bernt Jansen |

==== Final ====
Nine songs competed during the final on 15 February 2025. The winner, "Lighter" performed by Kyle Alessandro, was selected by a combination of a public vote (60%) and votes from ten international juries (40%). The viewers had a total of 645 points to award, while the juries had a total of 430 points to award. Each jury group distributed their points as follows: 1–8, 10 and 12 points. The viewer vote was based on the percentage of votes each song achieved through the following voting methods: app and online voting. For example, if a song gained 10% of the viewer vote, then that entry would be awarded 10% of 645 points rounded to the nearest integer: 65 points.

In addition to the performances of the competing entries, the show was opened by Gåte, who represented Norway in 2024, performing their competing song "Ulveham". The interval acts included performances from host Markus Neby, as well as Gåte members Gunnhild Sundli and John Stenersen, former MGP competing artists Reidun Sæther and Kim Wigaard, Marcus and Martinus (who represented Sweden in 2024), and Sissel Kyrkjebø as part of a tribute to Rolf Løvland, who won Eurovision 1995 as part of Secret Garden, and wrote four Norwegian Eurovision entries and two Eurovision winners for Norway: "La det swinge" (1985, Eurovision winning song performed by Bobbysocks); "Mitt liv" (1987, performed by Kate Gulbrandsen); "Duett" (1994, performed by Elisabeth Andreassen and Jan Werner Danielsen); and "Nocturne" (1995, Eurovision winning song performed by Secret Garden)

Final – 15 February 2025
| R/O | Artist | Song | Jury | Televote | Total | Place |
|---|---|---|---|---|---|---|
| 1 | Tone Damli | "Last Song" | 24 | 63 | 87 | 5 |
| 2 | Sondrey | "Vagabond" | 38 | 17 | 55 | 7 |
| 3 | Nora Jabri | "Sulale" | 55 | 19 | 74 | 6 |
| 4 | Wig Wam | "Human Fire" | 25 | 68 | 93 | 4 |
| 5 | LLL | "Parasite" | 36 | 18 | 54 | 8 |
| 6 | Kyle Alessandro | "Lighter" | 118 | 189 | 307 | 1 |
| 7 | Nataleen | "The Game" | 86 | 104 | 190 | 2 |
| 8 | Ladybug | "Hot as Hell in Paradise" | 19 | 32 | 51 | 9 |
| 9 | Bobbysocks | "Joyful" | 29 | 135 | 164 | 3 |

Detailed international jury votes
| R/O | Song | Denmark | Georgia | Luxembourg | Finland | Iceland | Croatia | Australia | Sweden | Ukraine | United Kingdom | Total |
| R/O | Song | Denmark | Georgia | Luxembourg | Finland | Iceland | Croatia | Australia | Sweden | Ukraine | United Kingdom | Total |
|---|---|---|---|---|---|---|---|---|---|---|---|---|
| 1 | "Last Song" | | | | | 8 | 2 | 6 | 8 | | | 24 |
| 2 | "Vagabond" | 2 | 8 | | 10 | 2 | 6 | 4 | 4 | 2 | | 38 |
| 3 | "Sulale" | 8 | 2 | 8 | 6 | 10 | 10 | 1 | | 6 | 4 | 55 |
| 4 | "Human Fire" | 1 | 4 | 6 | 1 | 1 | | 2 | | 4 | 6 | 25 |
| 5 | "Parasite" | 4 | | 2 | 4 | 4 | 1 | 10 | 1 | 8 | 2 | 36 |
| 6 | "Lighter" | 12 | 12 | 12 | 12 | 12 | 12 | 12 | 12 | 10 | 12 | 118 |
| 7 | "The Game" | 10 | 10 | 10 | 2 | 6 | 8 | 8 | 10 | 12 | 10 | 86 |
| 8 | "Hot As Hell in Paradise" | | 1 | 4 | | | 4 | | 2 | | 8 | 19 |
| 9 | "Joyful" | 6 | 6 | 1 | 8 | | | | 6 | 1 | 1 | 29 |
International jury spokespersons
Denmark – Molly Plank; Georgia – Natia Uznadze; Luxembourg – Eric Lehmann; Finland – Katri Norrlin; Iceland – Felix Bergsson; Croatia – Zlata Mück Susec; Australia – Danny Estrin; Sweden – Natalie Carrion; Ukraine – Oksana Skybinska; United Kingdom – Scott Ross

International jury members
| Country | Jury members |
|---|---|
| Australia | Angela Downing; Damian McDermott; Emily Griggs; Paul Clarke |
| Croatia | Davor Medaković; Jelena Balent; Luka Grgić; Maja Tokić (jury leader); Tihomir Preradović |
| Denmark | Anders Ugilt Andersen; Bryan Rice; Christian Ellegaard; Molly Plank (jury leader); Tilde Vinther |
| Finland | Aija Puurtinen; Enni Koistinen; Eva Frantz; Jenni Lambert; Matti Myllyaho |
| Georgia | Lasha Kapanadze; Manana Morchiladze; Natia Uznadze (jury leader); Salome Bakuradze; Zaza Orashvili |
| Iceland | Andrea Sigríður Jónsdóttir; Erna Hrönn Ólafsdóttir; Felix Bergsson (jury leader); Kolbrún María Másdóttir; Vilhjálmur Ósk Vilhjálmsson |
| Luxembourg | Eric Lehmann (jury leader); Lucas Zagdoudi; Naomi Ayé Vajdovics Suárez; Rafaela Teixeira Fernandes; Romain Heck |
| Sweden | Helene Wigren; Mathias Bridfelt; Natalie Carrion (jury leader); Natasha Azarmi; Robert Sehlberg |
| Ukraine | Herman Nenov; Ievgen Garbarenko; Oksana Skybinska (jury leader); Oleg Tsukrenko; Svitlana Tarabarova |
| United Kingdom | Andrew Cartmell (non-voting jury leader); Chris Chilvers; Harry Kersley; Kojo Samuel; Leila Al-Mitwally; Victoria Needs |

=== Calls to exclude Israel from the Eurovision Song Contest ===
On 6 May 2025, Norwegian singer-songwriter Charlotte Qvale and 17 other Norwegian artists wrote an open letter urging NRK to advocate for Israel's exclusion from the contest due to the ongoing war in Gaza. The letter argued that Norway "failed to utilize its influence, despite extensive documentation of alleged war crimes and human rights violations committed by Israel in Gaza", and compared NRK’s current stance with its support for the exclusion of Russia from the contest following the 2022 invasion of Ukraine. In response, NRK executives Vibeke Fürst Haugen, Camilla Bjørn, and Charlo Halvorsen issued a joint statement explaining that as an independent public broadcaster, NRK cannot act as a political entity and "therefore will not call for a cultural boycott of Israel in Eurovision". They emphasized NRK’s role in impartial news reporting and noted that participation in the contest is governed by European Broadcasting Union (EBU) membership criteria, to which they argue is the reason why Israel continues to participate while Russia was excluded.

== At Eurovision ==
The Eurovision Song Contest 2025 will take place at St. Jakobshalle in Basel, Switzerland, and will consist of two semi-finals to be held on the respective dates of 13 and 15 May and the final on 17 May 2025. During the allocation draw held on 28 January 2025, Norway was drawn to compete in the first semi-final, performing in the second half of the show.

Norway qualified for the Grand Final.

=== Voting ===
==== Points awarded to Norway ====
Points awarded to Norway (Semi-final 1)
| Score | Televote |
|---|---|
| 12 points | Ukraine |
| 10 points | Iceland |
| 8 points | Azerbaijan; Spain |
| 7 points | |
| 6 points | Cyprus |
| 5 points | Croatia; Estonia; Poland; Sweden |
| 4 points | |
| 3 points | Albania; Portugal; Rest of the World |
| 2 points | Belgium; Italy; Netherlands; Slovenia |
| 1 point | Switzerland |

Points awarded to Norway (Final)
| Score | Televote | Jury |
|---|---|---|
| 12 points | | |
| 10 points | Ukraine | |
| 8 points | Iceland | |
| 7 points | | |
| 6 points | Azerbaijan; Malta | Czechia; Iceland |
| 5 points | Cyprus | |
| 4 points | Armenia; Croatia; Georgia; Greece | Sweden |
| 3 points | Poland; Serbia | |
| 2 points | Czechia; Lithuania; Slovenia; Spain | Poland; Slovenia |
| 1 point | Italy; Latvia | Croatia; Germany |

==== Points awarded by Norway ====
Points awarded by Norway (Semi-final 1)
| Score | Televote |
|---|---|
| 12 points | Sweden |
| 10 points | Netherlands |
| 8 points | Iceland |
| 7 points | Poland |
| 6 points | Estonia |
| 5 points | Ukraine |
| 4 points | Albania |
| 3 points | Portugal |
| 2 points | San Marino |
| 1 point | Slovenia |

Points awarded by Norway (Final)
| Score | Televote | Jury |
|---|---|---|
| 12 points | Sweden | Austria |
| 10 points | Israel | Sweden |
| 8 points | Poland | Finland |
| 7 points | Estonia | United Kingdom |
| 6 points | Finland | Latvia |
| 5 points | Netherlands | Netherlands |
| 4 points | Lithuania | Estonia |
| 3 points | Iceland | Switzerland |
| 2 points | Ukraine | France |
| 1 point | Austria | Ukraine |

==== Detailed voting results ====
Each participating broadcaster assembles a five-member jury panel consisting of music industry professionals who are citizens of the country they represent. Each jury, and individual jury member, is required to meet a strict set of criteria regarding professional background, as well as diversity in gender and age. No member of a national jury was permitted to be related in any way to any of the competing acts in such a way that they cannot vote impartially and independently. The individual rankings of each jury member as well as the nation's televoting results were released shortly after the grand final.

The following members comprised the Norwegian jury:

- Kristian Kristensen
- Stian Tangerud
- Iris Mikalsen
- Reidun Sæther
- Vanessa Hütel Kure

Detailed voting results from Norway (Semi-final 1)
| R/O | Country | Televote | |
| R/O | Country | Rank | Points |
|---|---|---|---|
| 01 | Iceland | 3 | 8 |
| 02 | Poland | 4 | 7 |
| 03 | Slovenia | 10 | 1 |
| 04 | Estonia | 5 | 6 |
| 05 | Ukraine | 6 | 5 |
| 06 | Sweden | 1 | 12 |
| 07 | Portugal | 8 | 3 |
| 08 | Norway | | |
| 09 | Belgium | 13 | |
| 10 | Azerbaijan | 14 | |
| 11 | San Marino | 9 | 2 |
| 12 | Albania | 7 | 4 |
| 13 | Netherlands | 2 | 10 |
| 14 | Croatia | 11 | |
| 15 | Cyprus | 12 | |

Detailed voting results from Norway (Final)
| R/O | Country | Jury | | | | | | | Televote | |
| R/O | Country | Juror A | Juror B | Juror C | Juror D | Juror E | Rank | Points | Rank | Points |
|---|---|---|---|---|---|---|---|---|---|---|
| 01 | Norway | | | | | | | | | |
| 02 | Luxembourg | 18 | 12 | 24 | 15 | 23 | 21 | | 22 | |
| 03 | Estonia | 9 | 7 | 16 | 3 | 8 | 7 | 4 | 4 | 7 |
| 04 | Israel | 13 | 13 | 8 | 19 | 21 | 18 | | 2 | 10 |
| 05 | Lithuania | 19 | 18 | 23 | 24 | 20 | 24 | | 7 | 4 |
| 06 | Spain | 11 | 3 | 15 | 14 | 17 | 13 | | 18 | |
| 07 | Ukraine | 4 | 9 | 17 | 21 | 4 | 10 | 1 | 9 | 2 |
| 08 | United Kingdom | 3 | 8 | 7 | 5 | 18 | 4 | 7 | 21 | |
| 09 | Austria | 1 | 6 | 1 | 11 | 1 | 1 | 12 | 10 | 1 |
| 10 | Iceland | 22 | 23 | 18 | 13 | 24 | 22 | | 8 | 3 |
| 11 | Latvia | 15 | 20 | 3 | 20 | 2 | 5 | 6 | 14 | |
| 12 | Netherlands | 12 | 5 | 14 | 4 | 7 | 6 | 5 | 6 | 5 |
| 13 | Finland | 10 | 1 | 5 | 12 | 3 | 3 | 8 | 5 | 6 |
| 14 | Italy | 14 | 21 | 13 | 8 | 16 | 17 | | 12 | |
| 15 | Poland | 17 | 22 | 20 | 25 | 19 | 23 | | 3 | 8 |
| 16 | Germany | 5 | 25 | 21 | 6 | 22 | 14 | | 16 | |
| 17 | Greece | 24 | 11 | 2 | 17 | 11 | 12 | | 15 | |
| 18 | Armenia | 25 | 14 | 12 | 18 | 13 | 20 | | 24 | |
| 19 | Switzerland | 20 | 17 | 11 | 2 | 5 | 8 | 3 | 19 | |
| 20 | Malta | 16 | 19 | 22 | 10 | 12 | 19 | | 23 | |
| 21 | Portugal | 8 | 16 | 10 | 23 | 14 | 16 | | 20 | |
| 22 | Denmark | 7 | 10 | 6 | 9 | 10 | 11 | | 13 | |
| 23 | Sweden | 2 | 4 | 4 | 1 | 6 | 2 | 10 | 1 | 12 |
| 24 | France | 23 | 2 | 9 | 7 | 15 | 9 | 2 | 17 | |
| 25 | San Marino | 21 | 24 | 25 | 16 | 25 | 25 | | 25 | |
| 26 | Albania | 6 | 15 | 19 | 22 | 9 | 15 | | 11 | |
