= Iselilja (given name) =

Female given name

- Gender: Female

Origin
- Origin: Norwegian
- Region of origin: Norway

Other names
- Related names: Iselin

Iselilja is a Norwegian feminine given name. In 2015, in Norway 17 people had the name as a first name and 15 people had it as a middle name, according to SSB's name statistics.

== Origin ==
"Iselilja" is mentioned in the medieval Norwegian ballad "Knut Liten og Sylvelin", a song that has been recorded and released by Alf Cranner on the album Rosemalt Sound (1967), by the folk-rock band Kong Lavring on Den 2den (1978), and by Norwegian folk music band Gåte on their studio album Iselilja (2004) and their live album Liva (2006).

The name is, according to Norwegian historian Harald S. Næss in his eponymous Knut Hamsun biography (1984) and according to A Handbook of Scandinavian Names (2010), a probable influence for the later name Iselin known since the mid 18th century.
