= Kulning =

Scandinavian herding calls

Example of kulning

Kulning, also known as the Nordic herding call, is a work song and refers to high-pitched herding calls that were developed centuries ago in Norway and Sweden. Different regions have different names for these calls, such as kauka, lålla, kula, kulokk, and lockrop. These calls are part of Scandinavian herding music.

The songs and calls were used to guide the movement of livestock in the wilderness and to communicate in between farms.

Kulning consists of high-pitched, directed, non-vibrato calls, sometimes ending on a high note and sometimes on a low note. The melodies are often beautifully ornamented with the melancholy typical of Nordic folk music. Kulning also includes various lower-pitched calls and sounds that mimic animal sounds or are designed to catch the attention of animals.

Kulning was typically used mostly by women and girls, but also by some men.

== Acoustic characteristics ==
The song has a high-pitched vocal technique, i.e. a loud call using head tones, so that it can be heard or be used to communicate over long distances. It has a fascinating and haunting tone, often conveying a feeling of sadness, in large part because the kulokks often include typical half-tones and quarter-tones (also known as "blue tones") found in the music of the region. Linguist and phonetician Robert Eklund, speech therapist Anita McAllister and kulning singer and speech therapist Fanny Pehrson studied the difference between kulning voice production and head voice (sometimes somewhat confusingly referred to as falsetto) production in both indoors (normal and anechoic rooms) and in an ecologically valid outdoor setting near Dalarna, Sweden. The song analyzed was the same in all cases, and was performed by the same kulning singer (Pehrson). Comparing kulning to head voice, they found that partials were visible in far higher registers in kulning than in head voice (easily observed up to 16 kHz) and that they were also less affected by an increased distance from the source than head voice, with more or less unaffected partial patterns when comparing a distance of 11 meters from the source, compared to 1 meter from the source. In the outdoor setting, they also found that head voice production exhibited a 25.2 dB decrease at 11 meters from the source, compared to 1 meter from the source, while the corresponding amplitude decrease in kulning was only 9.4 dB, which is a clear indication that kulning is well-suited to carry over long distances in an outdoor setting. Or, as the authors summarize the findings:

It was shown that kulning fell off less with distance from an intensity point of view, and also that partials in kulning—but not in head voice—remained more or less unperturbed 11 meters from the singer, as compared to 1 meter from the singer. Both results help explain why kulning as a singing mode was developed for calling cattle that might be at considerable distance from the singer.

== Function and physiological characteristics ==
When a call is made in a valley, it rings and echoes against the mountains. The animals, a number of whom wear bells tuned so that the livestock's location can be heard, begin to respond to the call, answering back and the sound of the bells indicates that they are moving down the mountain towards their home farm. The kulokks can belong to an individual, but are sometimes family-based and are handed down so that a family's cows know they are being called and thus respond. A number of calls contain names of individual (sometimes the "lead") animals, as herds are not very large.

A study done by Finnish and Swedish universities showed that kulning, as compared to falsetto, exhibits a better contact of the vocal folds and a longer glottal closure in the phonation cycle. Using nasofiberendoscopy also showed medial and anteroposterior narrowing of the laryngeal inlet and approximation of the false vocal folds in kulning.

== Comparison with other regional song traditions ==
In comparison with other song traditions used in northern Scandinavia, e.g. joik, there is no evidence that kulning has been used in religious rituals or for other purposes. It has been used on farms in stock-raising since medieval times. The tradition is still alive today, although waning. Kulning is, however, similar to yodeling, a singing style also developed for long-distance sound propagation.

== Comparison with herdcalling songs in other countries ==
In France, briolage is a set of "techniques of calls and exhortations to the ploughing animals in most cases, intended to guide them."

== Kulning used in music ==
- Norwegian composer Edvard Grieg based a few of his classical music compositions for piano and for orchestra on kulokker that he had heard. An early Norwegian opera includes a soprano aria that is half aria and half kulning.
- Kulning features in the music of some Scandinavian folk groups, for example Heilung, Gjallarhorn and Frifot (featuring singer Lena Willemark).
- Danish musician Amalie Bruun (who fronts the solo black metal band Myrkur) uses kulning on the folk inspired album Folkesange. She has also posted a video on YouTube where she gives a demonstration of kulning techniques.
- The song "Ulveham" by Norwegian band Gåte, which was the Norwegian entry for the 2024 Eurovision Song Contest, includes a kulning vocalisation on the chorus.
- The kulning is sung throughout in the opera "La Reine Garçon" by Québécois composer Julien Bilodeau, a production collaborated between Opéra de Montréal and the Canadian Opera Company.

== Kulning in the media ==
There are also other examples of kulning to be found in other forms of modern media:

- Vocalist Christine Hals provided traditional Norwegian kulning for the soundtracks of the films Frozen (2013) and Ant-Man and the Wasp (2018), and as a voice actress in action-adventure video game God of War Ragnarök.
- In the song "Into the Unknown" for the 2019 film Frozen II, Norwegian singer Aurora's vocals are inspired by kulning.
- Russian director Andrei Tarkovsky's film Offret ("The Sacrifice" – Sweden, 1986) features kulning in its soundtrack.
- TV series Vikings features aggressive kulning during some battle scenes.
- The 2013 videogame Brothers: A Tale of Two Sons features kulning in its soundtrack.
- A 2019 episode of Scooby-Doo and Guess Who? features Daphne Blake and singer Sia at a kulning workshop in Sweden.

== See also ==
- Keening
- Lilting
- Yodeling
- Field holler
- Chanting in general, and the variant associated with Germanic and Norse pagan tradition
