= Kyle Alessandro =

Norwegian singer (born 2006)

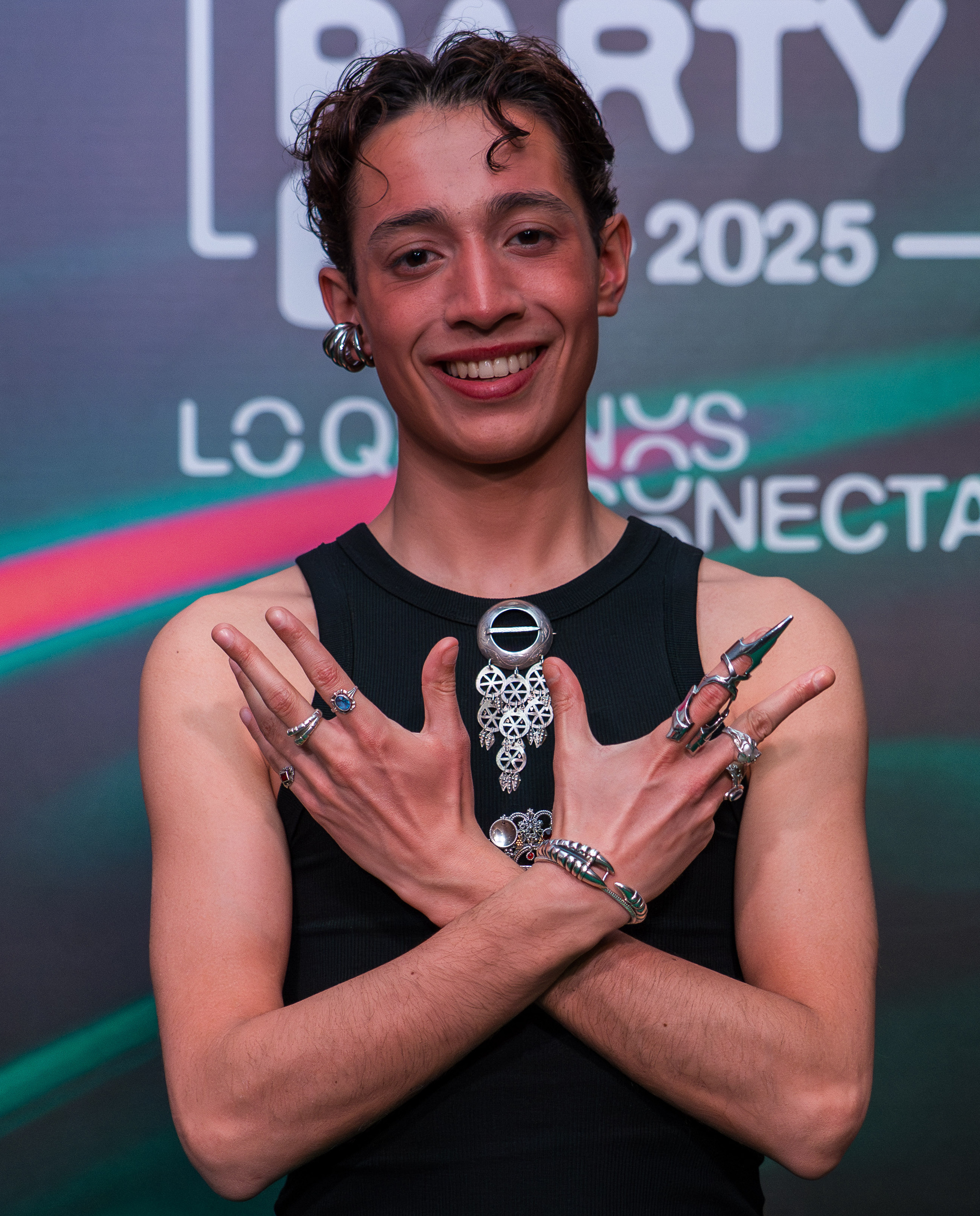
- Kyle Alessandro in 2025

Background information
- Born: Kyle Alessandro Helgesen Villalobos; 10 March 2006 (age 20); Levanger, Norway
- Origin: Steinkjer, Norway
- Genres: Pop; R&B
- Occupations: Singer; songwriter
- Instruments: Vocals; guitar
- Years active: 2017–present
- Formerly of: Umami Tsunami (2022–2024)
- Website: www.kylealessandro.com

Kyle Alessandro Helgesen Villalobos (born 10 March 2006) is a Norwegian singer-songwriter. He represented Norway in the Eurovision Song Contest 2025 with the song "Lighter".

== Early life ==
Alessandro was born on 10 March 2006 to a Spanish father and a Norwegian mother., in Levanger and raised in Steinkjer and Trondheim.

== Career ==
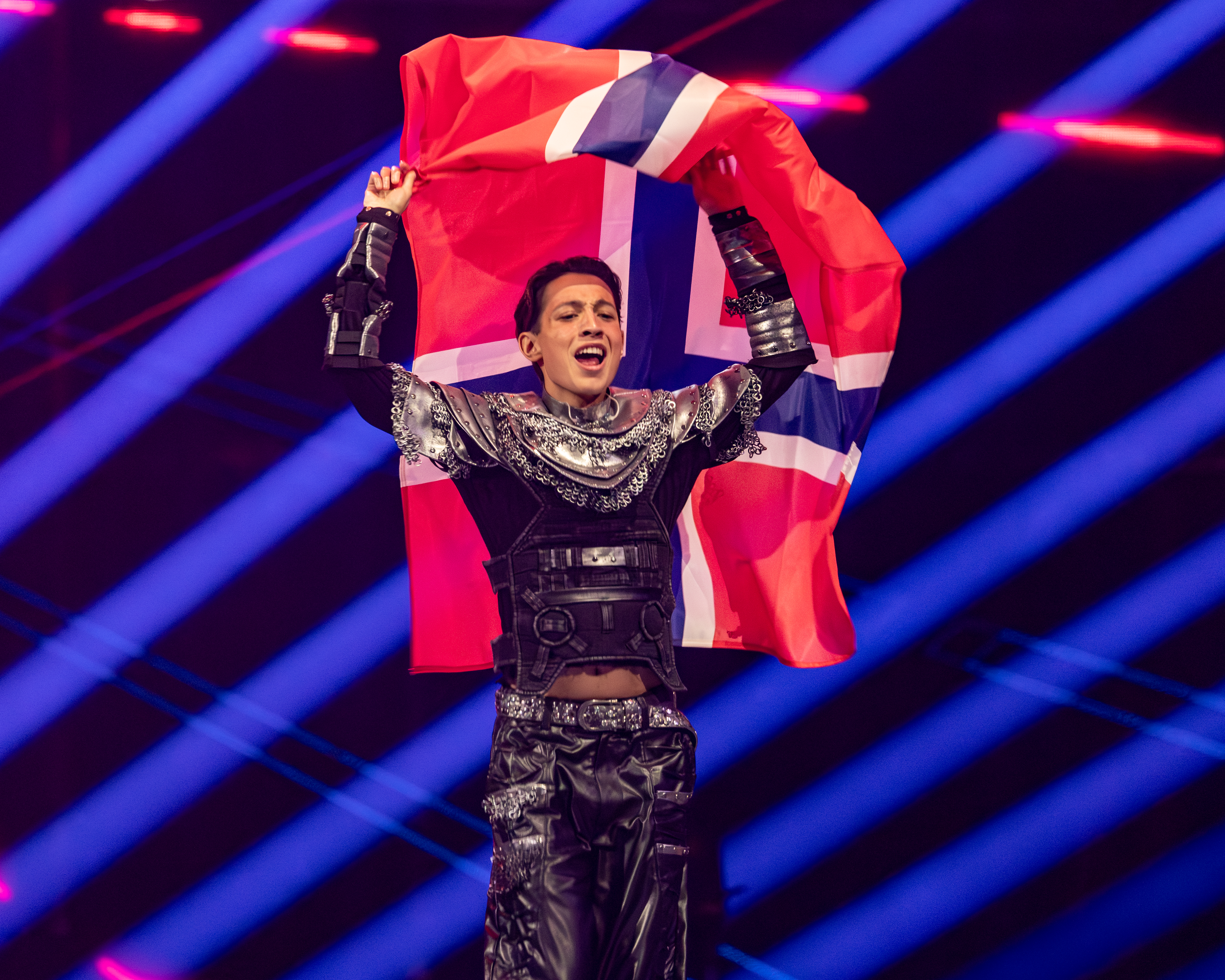
Alessandro, representing Norway, performing at Eurovision 2025 in Basel, Switzerland.

Alessandro took part in the casting show Norske Talenter, the Norwegian version of Got Talent, broadcast on TV 2 in 2017 at the age of ten. This was followed by appearances on TV shows such as Allsang på Grensen and he released several singles and the debut studio album Første kapittel.

At Melodi Grand Prix 2023, the Norwegian preliminary round for Eurovision Song Contest 2023, Kyle Alessandro performed together with Kristian Haugstøyl and Magnus Winjum as part of the collective project Umami Tsunami, before leaving in early 2024. The group qualified for the final with the song "Geronimo", in which they finished in last place. Two years later, he returned to Melodi Grand Prix 2025 as a solo artist with the song "Lighter", which he co-wrote with Swedish producer Adam Woods. He won the competition, earning him the right to represent Norway in the Eurovision Song Contest 2025 in Basel, Switzerland in May.

On 13 May 2025, Kyle Alessandro performed in the first semi-final of the contest, successfully qualifying for the grand final on 17 May 2025, where he finished in 18th place with 89 points, with a split score of 22 jury points and 67 televoting points. The highest amount of jury points awarded was two sets of six points from Czechia and Iceland. In the televote, the highest amount of points was a set of ten points from Ukraine. In response to his result, Alessandro stated to Aftenposten that "It's better than last place", commending his televote result of 12th. He further added that he felt "lucky to be here at all".

== Personal life ==
In August 2025, Alessandro came out as bisexual. In 2025 he announced his relationship with Norwegian model, Brede Bremnes. On 6 November 2026, at the P3 Gull Awards red carpet, he confirmed their breakup to TV 2.

== Discography ==
=== Studio albums ===
Title	Details
Første kapittel	Released: 1 January 2017; Label: Compro; Formats: Digital download, streaming
Evig & alltid	Released: 13 January 2023; Label: Self-released; Formats: Digital download, streaming
Aura	Released: 8 May 2026; Label: Warner Music Norway; Formats: Digital download, streaming

=== Singles ===
==== As lead artist ====
Title	Year	Peak chart positions										Album or EP
Title	Year	NOR	AUT	FIN	GER	ICE	LTU	NLD	SWE	SWI	WW Excl. US	Album or EP
"Din sang"	2017	—	—	—	—	—	—	—	—	—	—	Første kapittel
"Boomerang"	2017	—	—	—	—	—	—	—	—	—	—	Første kapittel
"Som du e"	2018	—	—	—	—	—	—	—	—	—	—	Første kapittel
"Dødskul"	2018	—	—	—	—	—	—	—	—	—	—	Første kapittel
"Señorita"	2018	—	—	—	—	—	—	—	—	—	—	Første kapittel
"Hoodie"	2018	—	—	—	—	—	—	—	—	—	—	Første kapittel
"Fly med meg"	2019	—	—	—	—	—	—	—	—	—	—	Første kapittel
"Hun er forelska i lærer’n"	2019	—	—	—	—	—	—	—	—	—	—	Non-album singles
"Mi corazón"	2019	—	—	—	—	—	—	—	—	—	—	Non-album singles
"Solo"	2022	—	—	—	—	—	—	—	—	—	—	Non-album singles
"Geronimo" (Umami Tsunami with Kristian Haux and Magnus Winjum)	2023	—	—	—	—	—	—	—	—	—	—	Geronimo
"Rodeo"	2024	—	—	—	—	—	—	—	—	—	—	Non-album singles
"Loyal" (Umami Tsunami with Kristian Haux)	2024	—	—	—	—	—	—	—	—	—	—	Non-album singles
"Pulse"	2024	—	—	—	—	—	99	—	—	—	—	Non-album singles
"Kommer du?" (with Hilmer)	2024	— (Note: "Kommer du?" did not enter the official Topplista Top 40 Singles Chart, but peaked at No. 21 on the Topplista Top 40 Radio Airplay chart.)	—	—	—	—	—	—	—	—	—	Non-album singles
"Lighter"	2025	6	14	18	68	6	2	44	19	8	172	Non-album singles
"Model"	2025	—	—	—	—	—	—	—	—	—	—	Non-album singles
"Rosary"	2026	—	—	—	—	—	—	—	—	—	—	Aura
"Backseat"	2026	—	—	—	—	—	—	—	—	—	—	Aura
"Halo"	2026	—	—	—	—	—	—	—	—	—	—	Aura
"Tide"	2026	—	—	—	—	—	—	—	—	—	—	TBA
"—" denotes a recording that did not chart or was not released in that territory.

==== As featured artist ====
Title	Year	Album or EP
"N.E.B.U.D." (Umami Tsunami, Kristian Haux, and Magnus Winjum featuring Kyle Alessandro)	2023	Non-album singles
"Tårer i paradis" (Kate Gulbrandsen featuring Kyle Alessandro)	2023	Non-album singles

== Awards and nominations ==
Year	Award	Category	Nominee(s)	Result	Ref.
2025	Eurovision Awards	Choreo Monarch	Himself	Nominated	
2025	Spellemanprisen	Song of the Year	Himself	Nominated	

== Notes ==
Awards and achievements
Preceded by Gåte with "Ulveham"	Norway in the Eurovision Song Contest; 2025	Succeeded by Jonas Lovv with "Ya Ya Ya"
