= Jonas Lovv =

Norwegian singer-songwriter (born 1994)

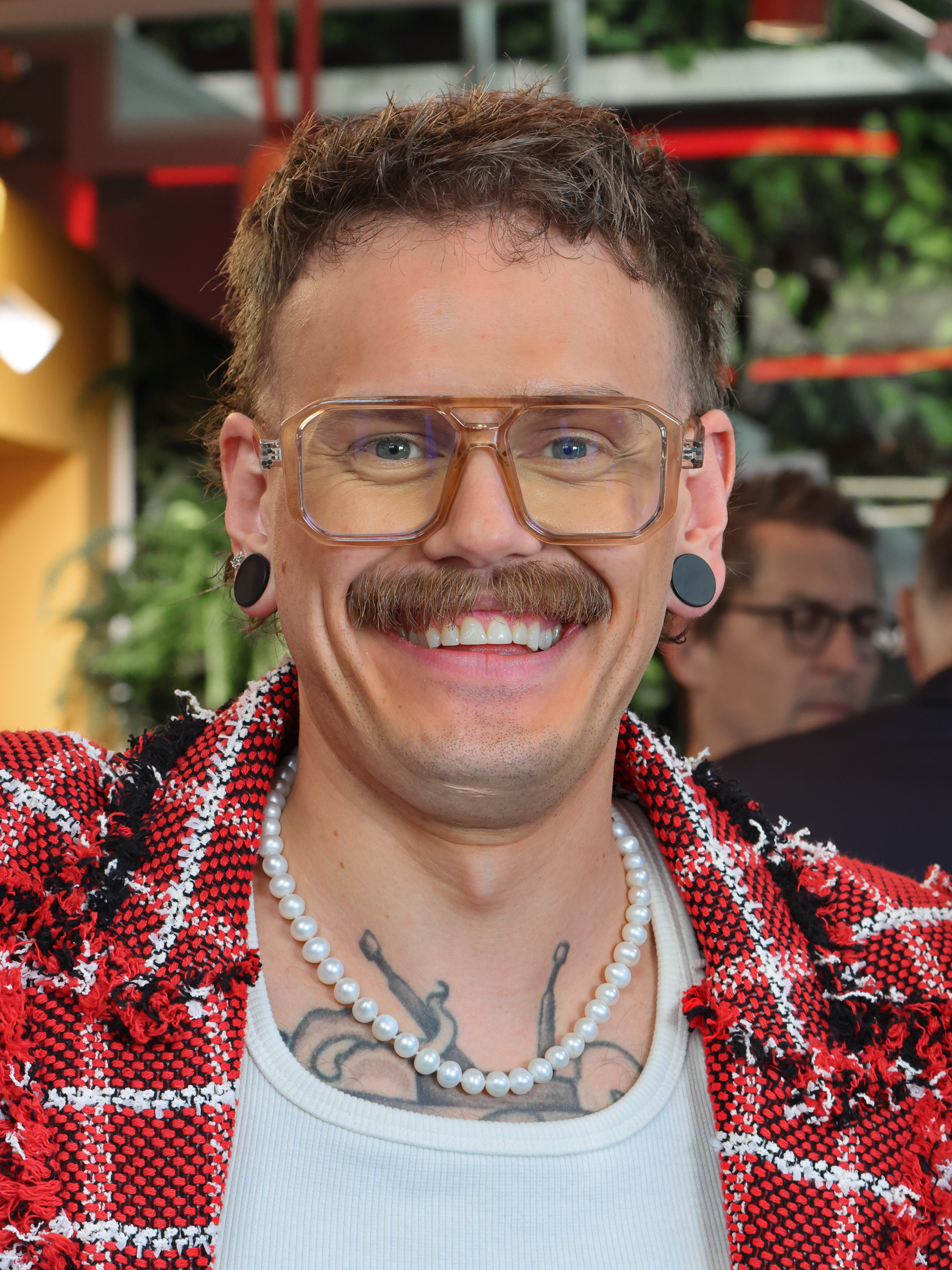
- Jonas Lovv in 2026

Background information
- Born: Jonas Lovv Hellesøy; 8 September 1994 (age 32); Bergen, Norway
- Occupations: Singer; songwriter
- Instrument: Vocals
- Years active: 2020–present
- Label: Stay Fabulous Records

Jonas Lovv Hellesøy (born 8 September 1994), is a Norwegian singer and songwriter. He represented Norway in the Eurovision Song Contest 2026 with the song "Ya Ya Ya".

== Career ==
In 2014, he participated in the auditions for Idol. He was the vocalist in the synth-pop trio Shuffle Baby, which released several singles until 2020. In 2025, Lovv participated in season 10 of The Voice – Norges beste stemme, where he reached the semi-final.

The Voice – Norges beste stemme season 10 Performances
	Song	Original Artist(s)	Notes
Blind Audition	"Play that Funky Music"	Wild Cherry	Three-chair turn, joins Team Espen
Battles	"Bullet Me"	The September When	Advanced
Knockouts	"Whole Lotta Love"	Led Zeppelin	Advanced
The Quarterfinals	Grace Kelly	Mika	Advanced - Public Vote
The Semi-finals	Love of My Life	Queen	Eliminated

In January 2026, Lovv was selected to take part in Melodi Grand Prix 2026 with the song "Ya Ya Ya". He won the competition, earning him the right to represent Norway in the Eurovision Song Contest 2026 in Vienna, Austria in May. In the final show he placed 14th with 134 points.

== Personal life ==
Lovv has a wife and a son.

== Discography ==
Credits taken from iTunes.

=== Extended plays ===
Title	Details
Fotografisk Minne	Released: 2 June 2023; Label: Stay Fabulous Records; Formats: Digital download, streaming

=== Singles ===
Title	Year	Peak chart positions		Album
Title	Year	NOR	NOR Air.	Album
"Oh Holy Night"	2020	—	—	Non-album singles
"Blind"	2021	—	—	Non-album singles
"Better"	2021	—	—	Non-album singles
"Old News"	2022	—	—	Non-album singles
"Lovely Liar"	2022	—	—	Non-album singles
"Naken"	2022	—	—	Fotografisk Minne
"Så lenge vi lever"	2023	—	—	Fotografisk Minne
"Spesiell"	2023	—	—	Fotografisk Minne
"Tomt dansegulv"	2023	—	—	Fotografisk Minne
"Hundretusen sider i min dagbok"	2023	—	—	Fotografisk Minne
"Mer enn venner"	2023	—	—	Non-album singles
"Godnattsang for nissunger"	2023	—	—	Non-album singles
"Teller du til hundre"	2024	—	—	Non-album singles
"Aldri tilbake"	2024	—	—	Non-album singles
"That's Okey"	2024	—	—	Non-album singles
"Ya Ya Ya"	2026	16	1	To be determined
"If We Die"	2026	—	—	To be determined
"Make a Boy Cry"	2026	—	—	To be determined
"Happy Xmas (War Is Over)"	2026	—	—	To be determined
"—" denotes a recording that did not chart or was not released in that territory.

Awards and achievements
Preceded by Kyle Alessandro with "Lighter"	Norway in the Eurovision Song Contest; 2026	Succeeded by TBA
