= Svevn =

Studio album by Gåte
- Released: 2018
- Recorded: Various
- Genre: Folk rock
- Length: 46:32
- Label: Drabant Music
- Producer: Magnus Børmark & Ronny Janssen

Gåte chronology
Liva (2006)	Svevn (2018)	Nord (2021)

Professional ratings
Review scores
Source	Rating
Verdens gang	2/6 stars
Dagbladet	5/6 stars
Adresseavisen	5/6 stars
Bergens Tidende	3/6 stars

Svevn is the third studio album by the Norwegian band Gåte. The album was released in 2018. It was the band's first studio album since 2004's Iselilja.

== Track listing ==
1. "Kom no disjka" (Alf Hulbækmo, Gåte, Ronny Janssen)
2. "Bannlyst" (Gåte, Knut Buen)
3. "Tonen" (Gåte, Buen)
4. "Åsmund Frægdegjæva" (Gjermund Landrø, Gåte, Kenneth Kapstad)
5. "Isdalskvinnen" (Gåte, Buen)
6. "Fanitullen" (Gåte, Buen)
7. "Horpa" (Gåte, Kristoffer Lo)
8. "Svevn" (Gåte, Buen)
9. "Draumeslagjè" (Gåte, Jonathan Altieri, Buen)
10. "Alvorsleiken" (Gåte, Buen)

== Personnel ==
Gåte

- Gunnhild Sundli - vocals
- Sveinung Sundli - fiddle, keyboard, vocals
- Magnus Børmark - guitar
- Jon Even Schärer - drums
- Mats Paulsen - bass

Technical personnel

- Ronny Janssen - production
- Christer André Cederberg - mixing
- Morten Lund - mastering
- Håvard Løvnes - album art
- Magnus Rakeng - album art design
- Terje Pedersen - A&R

== Charts ==
Chart (2018)	Peak position
Norwegian Albums (VG-lista)	11
