= Attersyn =

EP by Gåte
- Released: 3 November 2017.
- Genre: Folk-rock
- Length: 18:38
- Label: Drabant Music

Gåte chronology
Statt opp (Maggeduliadei) (2003)	Attersyn (2017)	Til Nord (2021)

Professional ratings
Review scores
Source	Rating
Hamar Arbeiderblad	6/6 stars
Verdens gang	3/6 stars

Attersyn is the fourth EP released by the Norwegian band Gåte. The EP was released on 3 November 2017.

== Track listing ==
All tracks are written by Gåte, except where noted.

No.	Title	Length
1.	"Stolt solvår"	3:37
2.	"Rideboll og Gullborg"	4:29
3.	"Draumefanga"	5:40
4.	"Venelite"	4:51
Total length:		18:38
