= Iselin (given name) =

- Gender: Female

Origin
- Origin: Norwegian
- Region of origin: Norway

Other names
- Related names: Iseline, Iselilja

Iselin is a Norwegian feminine given name (2937 as first name, 2404 second).

== Origin ==
It has several possible origins:

- German pet form of Old High German names beginning with Ise[n]- (e.g. Iselinde or Isengard).
- German pet form of Isa
- Norwegian variant form of the Irish name Aisling

== Notable people ==
Notable Norwegians with the given name include;

- Iselin Alme (born 1957), Norwegian singer and stage actress
- Iselin Michelsen (born 1990), Norwegian model and singer
- Iselin Nybø (born 1981), Norwegian politician
- Iselin Solheim (born 1990), Norwegian singer-songwriter
- Iselin Steiro (born 1985), Norwegian model
