= Hedda Mae =

Norwegian singer-songwriter

- Born: Hedda Aalvik Grønhaug; 1998 (age 27–28); Bergen, Norway
- Origin: Bergen , Norway
- Genre: Pop music
- Occupations: Singer; songwriter
- Instrument: Vocals
- Years active: 2020–present

Hedda Aalvik Grønhaug (born 1998), professionally known as Hedda Mae, is a Norwegian singer-songwriter from Bergen.

== Background ==
Grønhaug took part in a choir. During middle school, she took part in a cultural exchange programme where small bands were made, called "Lipstick Music". At 17, she started taking singing lessons with Myrna Braza, who introduced Grønhaug to songwriting.

== Career ==
Grønhaug released her single "Pride Goes Before a Fall" in 2020.

In 2021, she appeared in NRK music series "De Neste". The same year, she released her second EP "The Early Struggles of a Late Millennial". A track on the EP, "Take It Or Leave It", was nominated as an NPS "Single of the Week".

In 2022, Grønhaug released her third EP "This Might Get Loud". In the same year, she was a supporting act for Kakkmaddafakka on their tour across Europe.

Following a two-year absence and the releases of multiple singles, in 2024 Hedda released her debut album "Channel Mae". She stated that she originally envisioned making an introductory album and that there would be a sound that would run through the album as a common thread. A single on the album, titled "La Di Frickin Da", was inspired by negative comments on her music. The following year, her track "Once you pop (you can't stop)" was nominated as a "Song of the Week" on 370.no in 2025. In the same year, she performed at Fadderveka.

In 2026, Grønhaug took part "Melodi Grand Prix" with the track "Snap Back". She placed 8th in the final, with a total of 15 points. Following "Melodi Grand Prix", Grønhaug released her single "Crash", which was also nominated as a "Single of the Week" by 370.no.

Grønhaug has performed at festivals such as Reeperbahn, The Great Escape and the SPOT Festival. She has also performed at Vill Vill Vest, Trondheim Calling, by:Larm and at the Parkteatret.

== Style and influences ==
Grønhaug has cited aesthetics of the 2000s and 1990s as an influence on her music. She has also named Bruno Mars, Anderson. Paak and Britney Spears amongst inspirations of hers.

== Discography ==
=== Singles ===
Title	Year
"Pride Goes Before a Fall"	2020
"Rhythm to Myself"	2022
"Another Stranger"	2022
"La Di Frickin Da"	2024
"Someone Better"	2024
"Blow a Kiss"	2024
"Big Heart"	2024
"Once You Pop (You Never Stop)"	2025
"Snap Back"	2026
"Crash"	2026

=== EP's ===
- "Introducing: Hedda Mae" (2020)
- "The Early Struggles of a Late Millennial" (2021)
- "This Might Get Loud" (2022)

=== Albums ===
- "Channel Mae" (2024)
