= Statt opp (Maggeduliadei) =

EP by Gåte
- Released: 2003
- Recorded: Nidaros Studio, Trondheim
- Genre: Folk-rock
- Length: 17:47
- Label: Warner Music Norway
- Producer: Alex Møklebust

Gåte chronology
Jygri (2002)	Statt opp (Maggeduliadei) (2003)	Attersyn (2017)

Statt opp (Maggeduliadei) is the third EP released by the Norwegian band Gåte.

== Track listing ==
1. "Statt opp (Maggeduliadei)"
2. "Til deg" (vocal version)
3. "Bendik og Årolilja" (live)
4. "Litle fuglen" (demo)

== Charts ==
Chart (2003)	Peak position
Norway (VG-lista)	4
