= Iselilja =

Studio album by Gåte
- Released: 2004
- Recorded: Propeller Music Division, Oslo
- Genres: Folk rock; Norwegian folk; progressive rock
- Length: 49:28
- Label: Warner Music
- Producer: Kåre Christoffer Vestrheim

Gåte chronology
Sjå attende (2004)	Iselilja (2004)	Liva (2006)

Singles from Iselilja
- 1. "Sjå Attende" Released: 2004; 2. "Sjåaren" Released: 2004 (Promo)

Alternative cover
- Cover of the international edition

Professional ratings
Review scores
Source	Rating
Verdens gang	5/6 stars
Adresseavisen	5/6 stars

Iselilja is the second album released by the Norwegian folk music band Gåte. The album was released in 2004.

The name Iselilja occurs in the lyrics of the third track of the album, the Norwegian folksong "Knut Liten og Sylvelin".

== Track listing ==
All lyrics are traditional, unless noted. All music by Sveinung Sundli, unless noted. Traditional songs arranged by Gåte and Kåre Christoffer Vestrheim.

No.	Title	Lyrics	Music	Length
1.	"Fredlysning"	Astrid Krogh Halse		3:00
2.	"Sjå attende"		Traditional	3:48
3.	"Knut liten og sylvelin"			5:50
4.	"Du som er ung"	Halse		3:38
5.	"Jomfruva ingebjør"		Traditional	5:20
6.	"Sjåaren"	Halse		4:24
7.	"Rike rodenigår"		Traditional	3:19
8.	"Ola I"	Instrumental		2:41
9.	"Kjærleik"	Knut Buen	Buen	5:32
10.	"Gjendines bånsull"		Traditional; Gåte	11:22
Total length:				49:28

== Personnel ==
Gåte

- Gunnhild Sundli – vocals
- Magnus Børmark – guitars
- Sveinung Sundli – keyboards, hardanger fiddle, violin
- Gjermund Landrø – bass
- Martin Viktor Langlie – drums, percussion

Additional personnel

- Sturla Eide – hardanger fiddle, violin
- Daniel Sandén – nyckelharpa, hardanger fiddle
- Kåre Christoffer Vestrheim – keyboards, arrangement, programming, production
- Mike Hartung – mixing
- Björn Engelmann – mastering
- Magnus Rakeng – artwork
