= Jygri =

Studio album by Gåte
- Released: 2002
- Recorded: Various
- Genre: Folk rock
- Length: 51:37
- Label: Warner Music
- Producer: Alex Møklebust

Gåte chronology
Gåte EP (2002)	Jygri (2002)	Statt opp (2004)

Professional ratings
Review scores
Source	Rating
Verdens gang	6/6 stars

Jygri is the first album released by the Norwegian band Gåte, and sold 42,000 copies in Norway.

== Track listing ==
1. "Bendik og Årolilja"
2. "Snåle mi jente"
3. "Til deg"
4. "Springleik"
5. "Stengd dør"
6. "Kara tu omna"
7. "Jygri"
8. "Bruremarsj frå Jämtland"
9. "Skrømt"
10. "Inga Litimor"
11. "Margit Hjukse"
12. "Solbønn"

The band won a Spellemann award for Best New Artists thanks to their debut album "Jygri".

== Charts ==
Chart (2006)	Peak position
Norwegian Albums (VG-lista)	1
