= Ya Ya Ya =

2026 song by Jonas Lovv

Single by Jonas Lovv
- Language: English
- Released: 26 January 2026
- Genre: Rock
- Length: 2:50
- Label: Warner Music Norway
- Songwriters: Jonas Lovv Hellesøy; Sondre Skaftun
- Producer: Sondre Skaftun

Music video
- "Ya Ya Ya" on YouTube

Eurovision Song Contest 2026 entry
- Country: Norway
- Artist: Jonas Lovv
- Language: English
- Composer: Sondre Skaftun
- Lyricist: Jonas Lovv Hellesøy

Finals performance
- Semi-final result: 4th
- Semi-final points: 206
- Final result: 14th
- Final points: 134

Entry chronology
- ◄ "Lighter" (2025)

Official performance video
- "Ya Ya Ya" (second semi-final) on YouTube "Ya Ya Ya" (grand final) on YouTube

"Ya Ya Ya" is a song by Norwegian singer-songwriter Jonas Lovv. It was written by himself and produced by Sondre Skaftun. It was released on 26 January 2026, and represented Norway in the Eurovision Song Contest 2026, and finished in fourteenth place. The song has reached number sixteen on the Norwegian Singles Chart.

== Critical reception ==
"Ya Ya Ya" was met with positive to mixed reviews from Norwegian music critics. In a pre-contest review for NRK, Jim Ødegård Pedersen and Sofie Martesdatter Granberg praised the entry's energy and composition. Giving a six out of six rating, Pedersen noted that the track was the strongest in the selection, remarking on its immediate impact and potential to succeed both MGP and at Eurovision. Granberg, rating it a four out of six, drew comparisons between the song's guitar-driven sound and British indie music from the 2000s, describing the work as "rocking" and full of "groove". Post-MGP, Pedersen retained his six out of six rating. He applauded his "vocally outstanding" vocals and praised his live performance, calling it "intense and energetic... that really impresses". He also remarked the song’s driving bass line and drew stylistic comparisons to a blend of the White Stripes and Benson Boone.

Similarly, Ralf Lofstad of Dagbladet gave the song a five out of six pre-contest, praising his vocal delivery, noting that he "sings very strongly and reaches high notes with great confidence". Post-MGP, he rated the track a six out of six, describing it as a "guitar-heavy rock song" that is "driving and catchy", and commended his live vocals, calling it "simply fantastic". Writing for TV 2, Line Haus awarded the track a six out of six, praising Lovv's "charming arrogance" and his natural ability to connect with the camera. She noted that the live performance successfully created a "concert feeling" that appealed to both the live audience and home viewers. Haus further remarked that the rock-influenced energy of the entry was the strongest in the competition, describing Lovv as a standout "star".

In Nettavisen, Maria Ludvigsen and Pål Nisja-Wilhelmsen provided mixed reviews. Ludvigsen gave the track a four out of six, citing Lovv's "raw voice" as a strength. Although she found certain parts of the song awkward, she praised its memorability and catchiness compared to the other MGP entries. Conversely, Wilhelmsen gave the song a rating of three out of six, characterising it as "generic pop-rock" and criticising its lack of momentum and perceived lack of "animal" energy.

== Eurovision Song Contest 2026 ==
=== Melodi Grand Prix 2026 ===
Melodi Grand Prix 2026 was the 64th edition of the Norwegian national final Melodi Grand Prix (MGP), which selected Norway's entry for the Eurovision Song Contest 2026. The show took place on 28 February 2026 at the Håkons Hall in Lillehammer. The competition consisted of two stages. The first stage was a radio selection titled MGP-cupen ("MGP cup"), which took place between 20 and 26 January 2026 during the NRK P1 programme Nitimen. Eight songs competed over three rounds of duels and the winning entry qualified to the second stage, which was the final, on 28 February 2026, joining the eight pre-qualified finalists. The results of MGP-cupen were determined exclusively by public online voting through NRK's official website nrk.no.

On 19 January 2026 during a press conference at NRK's studio 1, it was announced that Lovv would be entering Melodi Grand Prix 2026 with the song "Ya Ya Ya". He won the competition, earning him the right to represent Norway in the Eurovision Song Contest 2026 in Vienna, Austria in May.

=== At Eurovision ===
The Eurovision Song Contest 2026 took place at Wiener Stadthalle in Vienna, Austria, and consisted of two semi-finals held on the respective dates of 12 and 14 May and the final on 16 May 2026. During the allocation draw held on 12 January 2026, Norway was drawn to compete in the second semi-final, performing in the second half of the show. Lovv was later drawn to close the semi-final. The song ranked 14th, with 134 points, including 115 jury and 19 public points.

== Charts ==
Chart performance for "Ya Ya Ya"
Chart (2026)	Peak position
Australia Digital (ARIA)	49
Austria (Ö3 Austria Top 40)	46
Lithuania (AGATA)	42
Norway (VG-lista)	16
Norway Airplay (IFPI Norge)	1
Sweden Heatseeker (Sverigetopplistan)	2
UK Singles Sales (OCC)	36
