= Nord (Gåte album) =

2021 album by Gåte

Nord and Til Nord are two similarly named music projects released by the Norwegian band Gåte in 2021.

== Nord ==
Nord

Studio album by Gåte
- Released: 3 December 2021
- Recorded: Various
- Genre: Folk rock
- Length: 47:01
- Label: Indie Recordings

Gåte chronology
Svevn (2018)	Nord (2021)

Professional ratings
Review scores
Source	Rating
Stavanger Aftenblad	4/6 stars
Klassekampen	5.5/6 stars
Gaffa	4/6 stars
Adresseavisen	5/6 stars

Nord is the fourth studio album by the Norwegian band Gåte. The album was released on 3 December 2021.

=== Track listing ===
All tracks are written by Gåte, except where noted

No.	Title	Length
1.	"Solfager og Ormekongen"	4:54
2.	"Svik"	4:59
3.	"Hemnarsverdet"	7:15
4.	"Horpa"	3:16
5.	"Talande tunger"	2:24
6.	"Rideboll og Gullborg (Acoustic)"	3:56
7.	"Sigurd og Trollbrura"	4:10
8.	"Kjærleik (Acoustic)"	6:23
9.	"Jomfrua Ingebjørg"	4:28
10.	"Sjåaren"	5:17
Total length:		47:01

== Til Nord ==
Til Nord

EP by Gåte
- Released: 21 May 2021
- Genre: Folk-rock
- Length: 24:34
- Label: Indie Recordings

Gåte chronology
Attersyn (2017)	Til Nord (2021)

Professional ratings
Review scores
Source	Rating
Norway Rock Magazine	5.5/6 stars
Adresseavisen	4/6 stars

Til Nord is the fifth EP released by the Norwegian band Gåte. The EP was released on 21 May 2021.

=== Track listing ===
All tracks are written by Gåte, except where noted

No.	Title	Length
1.	"Kjærleik (Acoustic Version)"	6:23
2.	"Hemnarsverdet"	7:14
3.	"Horpa (Acoustic Version)"	3:15
4.	"Rideboll og Gullborg (Acoustic Version)"	3:55
5.	"Til deg (Acoustic Version)"	3:45
Total length:		24:34
