= Gåte EP =

Two self-titled EPs by Gåte

EP by Gåte
- Released: 2000
- Genre: Folk-rock
- Label: Warner Music Norway
- Producer: Thomas Henriksen, Gustav Hylen and Gåte

Gåte chronology
Gåte EP (2000)	Gåte EP (2002)

Gåte EP is the name of two self-titled EPs released by the Norwegian band Gåte.

== Gåte EP (2000) ==
Gåte EP is the first self-titled EP, and was released in the year 2000.

=== Track listing ===
1. "Byssanlull"
2. "Litlefuglen"
3. "Solbønn"
4. "Grusomme skjebne"
5. "Eg veit i himmelrik ein borg"

Gåte EP

EP by Gåte
- Released: 2002
- Genre: Folk-rock
- Label: Warner Music Norway
- Producer: Alex Møklebust

Gåte chronology
Gåte EP (2000)	Gåte EP (2002)	Jygri (2002)

== Gåte EP (2002) ==
Gåte EP is the second self-titled EP, and was released in the year 2002.

=== Track listing ===
1. "Grusomme skjebne"
2. "Følgje"
3. "Liti Kjersti"
4. "Storås"

== Charts ==
Chart (2002)	Peak position
Norway (VG-lista)	2
