= Gåte =

Norwegian folk electronica/metal band

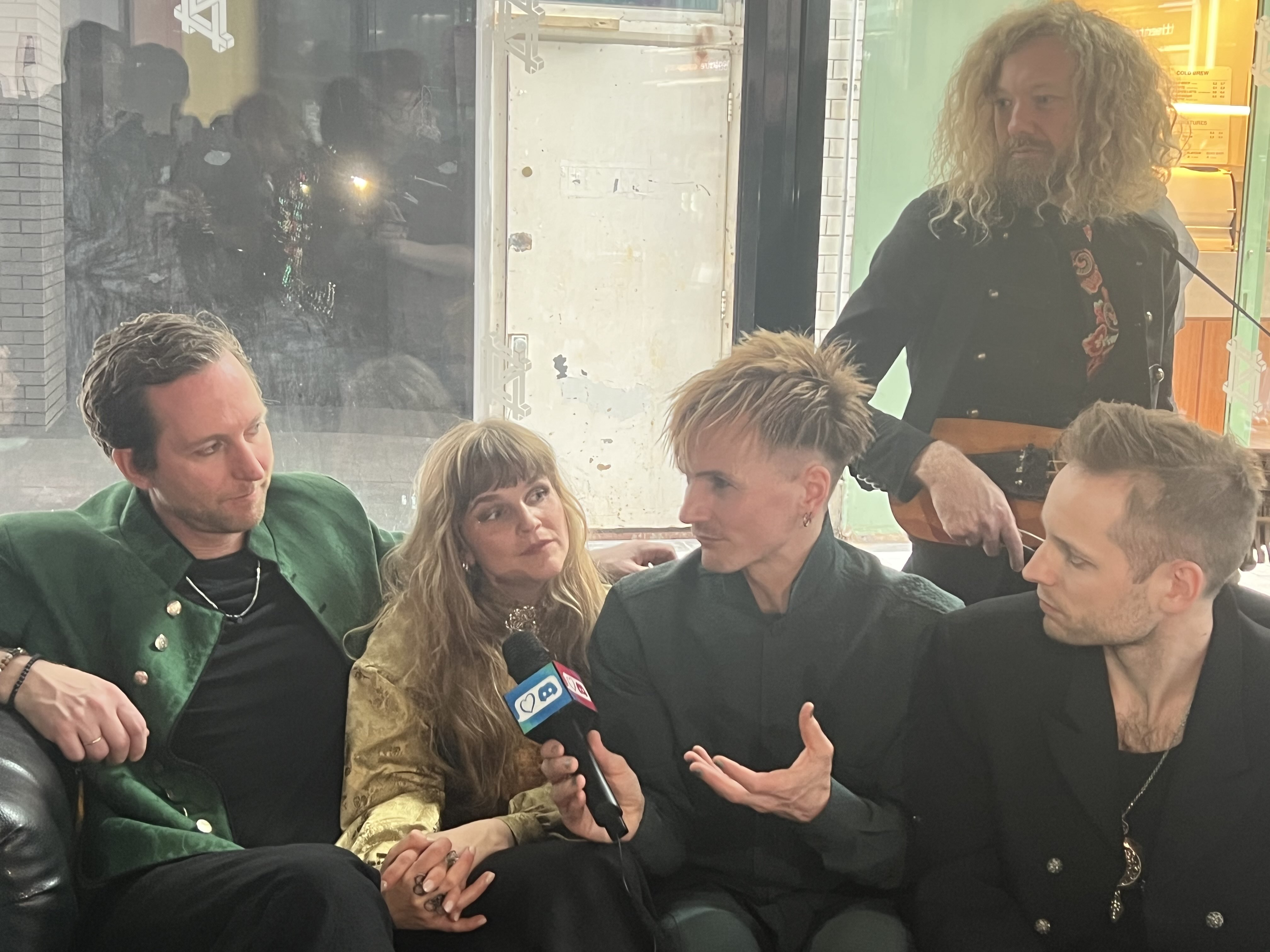
- Gåte in 2024

Background information
- Origin: Trøndelag, Norway
- Genres: Folk rock; progressive rock; Norwegian folk; electronica; folk metal; progressive metal
- Years active: 1999–2005; 2009–2010; 2017–present
- Label: Warner Music Group
- Members: Gunnhild Sundli; Magnus Børmark; Jon Even Schärer; Mats Paulsen; John Stenersen
- Past members: Sveinung Sundli; Ole Jonas Storli; Katrin Frøder; Gjermund Landrø; Kenneth Kapstad; Martin Langlie; Halvor Hoem
- Website: gaateofficial.com

Gåte (pronounced [ˈɡôːtə]; Norwegian for 'riddle') is a band from Trøndelag, Norway playing Norwegian folk music bred with metal and electronica. Their style has been referred to as progressive folk-rock. The band was put together by Sveinung Sundli (violin, keyboards) in 2000 and originally consisted of his younger sister Gunnhild Sundli (vocals), Gjermund Landrø (bass, backing vocals), Martin Langlie (drums) and Magnus Børmark (guitar, keyboards). Langlie was replaced by Kenneth Kapstad in 2004. They represented Norway in the Eurovision Song Contest 2024 with the song "Ulveham".

== History ==
The band released their first EP, Gåte EP in 2000, and rapidly gained popularity. A second EP, also self-titled, was released in 2002. Their first album, Jygri, released the same year, proved to be their commercial breakthrough both in Norway and abroad, particularly in Scandinavia and Germany. They also gained a lot of media attention, particularly the distinctive voice of Gunnhild Sundli caught the interest of music journalists, who immediately started to speculate on her departure in order to establish a solo career. After the release of another EP, Statt opp (Maggeduliadei) in 2003, and their second album, Iselilja in 2004, the band announced that they were taking a break. In their press release, issued September 6, one of the reasons cited was that Gunnhild wanted to devote time to other pursuits. Nevertheless, their record company Warner Music Norway issued a live album, titled Liva, in 2006 which had been recorded at the Rockefeller Music Hall the previous year, and with bonus material from their concert at the Roskilde Festival in 2003. Gåte made a comeback in 2017 with the EP Attersyn, followed by the album Svevn in 2018.

During the first part of their career they toured extensively and played almost every popular music festival in Norway, as well as the major international festival Roskilde Festival in Denmark. The band reunited for one concert in 2009, but then decided to follow this up with a mini-tour of Norway consisting of five concerts in 2010. The fifth concert was held at the roof of the Oslo Opera House, and the band stated that this would be their final farewell. In 2018, they started touring Norway again.

In August 2023, Gåte announced that Sveinung was temporarily leaving the band and would not participate in the upcoming tour.

The band took part in Melodi Grand Prix 2024, the Norwegian selection for the Eurovision Song Contest 2024, with the song "Ulveham". They qualified from their semi-final on 20 January 2024 and ultimately won the final on 3 February 2024.

At Eurovision 2024, Gåte finished 10th in the second semifinal on 9 May, qualifying them for the Grand Final on 11 May, where they finished 25th.

== Song origins ==
Many of Gåte's songs are rearranged versions of traditional Norwegian folk tunes, such as "Sjå Attende" (the title translates to "Look Back"), and "Knut Liten og Sylvelin" ("Little-Knut and Sylvelin"). Another main source of Gåte songs are poems by the Norwegian poet Astrid Krog Halse with added music by Sveinung Sundli, such as "Følgje" ("Company") and "Stengd Dør" ("Closed Door"). Some of their songs were written in Nynorsk/Landsmål and performed in a broad Trøndersk dialect.

On "Svevn", several songs have lyrics by veteran folk musician Knut Buen, who also wrote the lyrics to "Kjærleik" on "Iselilja".

== Members ==
=== Gunnhild Sundli – Lead vocals ===
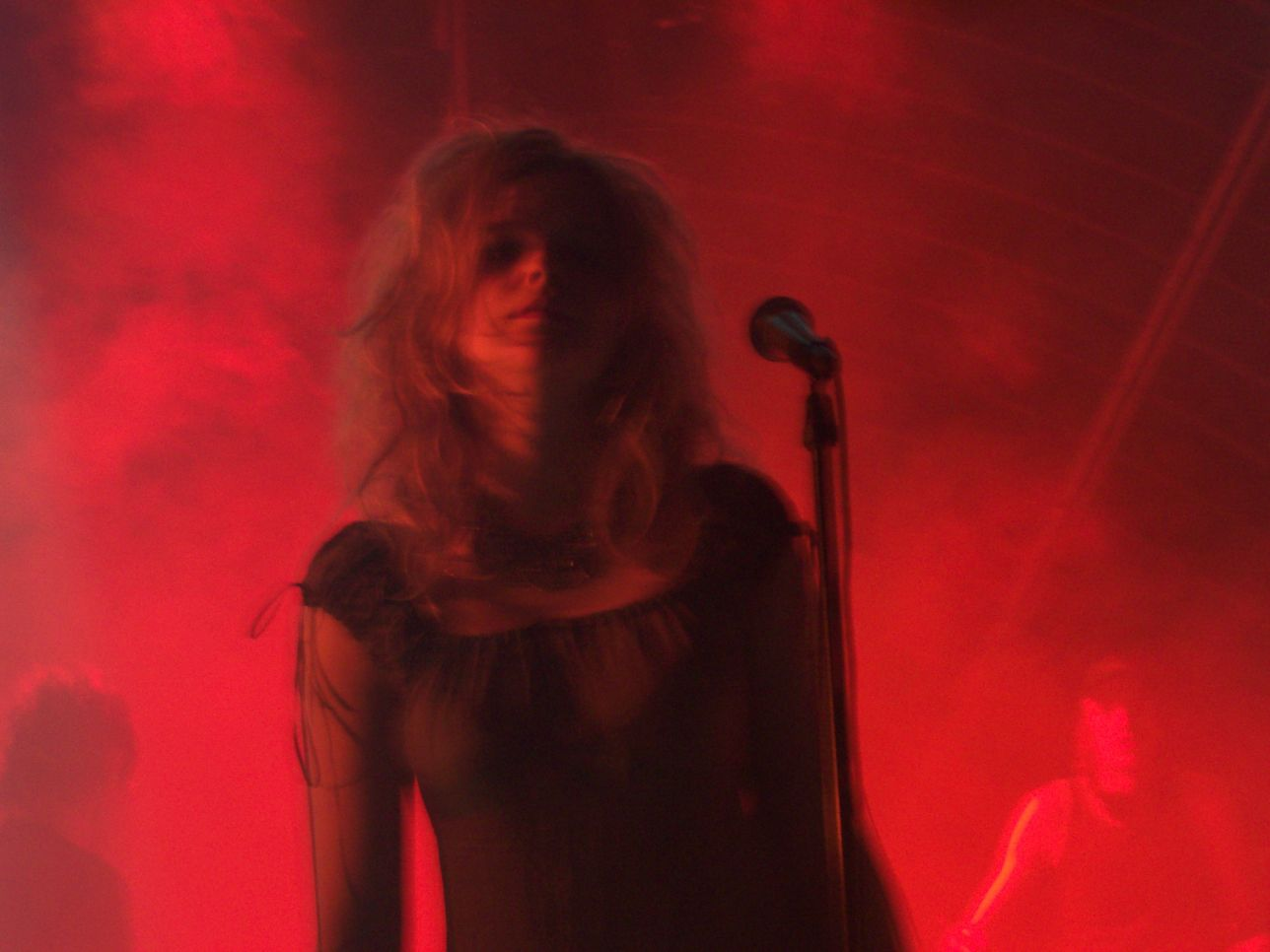
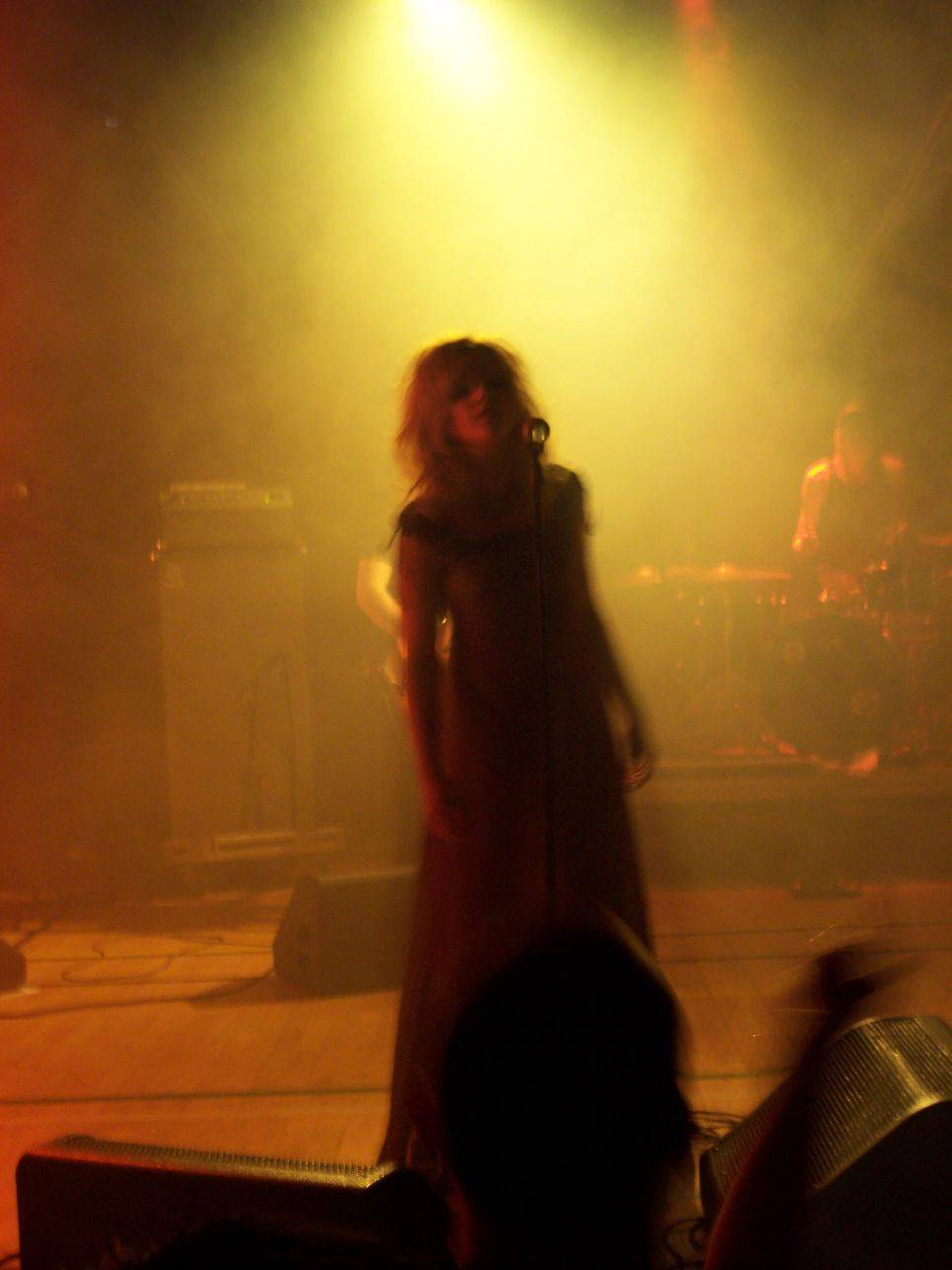
- Two pictures of Gunnhild Sundli at Rock mot rus at Andøya, 2005.

Gunnhild (born 2 July 1985) is the band's lead vocalist and joined the band in 1999. She was born and grew up in Orkdal Municipality, and currently resides in Trondheim Municipality. She began to sing when she was 9 years old, and has since been singing in both classical and jazz music. She studied singing at Heimdal Upper Secondary School.

=== Magnus Børmark – Guitars ===
Børmark (born 21 November 1982) is from Trondheim. He learned to play guitar and piano from his older brother. He has played in popular rock bands, such as Torch, before joining Gåte in December 2000. He plays a Fender Telecaster, Robotcaster and Les Robot, the last two being made by Frank Stavem. He also plays guitar in the band 22.

=== Jon Even Schärer – Drums & Backing vocals ===
Schärer (born 27 September 1990) is from Kvikne. He is the band drummer and collaborates with Norwegian artists as a lyricist to promote folk music. He is also an educational manager in a kindergarten and finished his bachelor's thesis in kindergarten education.

=== Mats Paulsen – Bass & Backing vocals ===
Paulsen (born 1 March 1983) is a bass player from Trondheim. Together with Børmark, they formed the Norwegian band 22. He also became a finalist in the Norwegian version of MasterChef in 2010.

== Session Members ==
=== John Stenersen – Nyckelharpa, Keyboards & Backing vocals (Live) ===
Stenersen is a musician and composer from Risør Municipality. He plays ancient Nordic instruments such as the nyckelharpa, moraharpa, and hurdy-gurdy.

== Discography ==
=== Albums ===
List of studio albums, with selected details
Title	Details	Peak chart positions
Title	Details	NOR
Jygri	Released: 26 September 2002; Label: Warner Music Norway; Formats: Physical, digital download, streaming	1
Iselilja	Released: 18 October 2004; Label: Warner Music Norway AS; Formats: Physical, digital download, streaming	3
Liva	Released: 3 April 2006; Label: Warner Music Norway AS; Formats: Physical, digital download, streaming	15
Svevn	Released: 2 November 2018; Label: Drabant Music; Formats: Physical, digital download, streaming	11
Nord	Released: 3 December 2021; Label: Indie Recordings; Formats: Physical, digital download, streaming	—
Ulveham	Released: 3 May 2024; Label: Indie Recordings; Formats: Physical, digital download, streaming	—
Sigil	Released: 25 September 2026; Label: Season of Mist; Formats: CD, LP, digital download, streaming	— (Note: Sigil did not enter the Norwegian Top 100 Albums chart, but peaked at number four on the Norwegian Physical Albums chart.)
"—" denotes an album that did not chart or was not released in that territory.

=== Extended plays ===
List of extended plays, with selected details
Title	Details	Peak chart positions
Title	Details	NOR
Gåte EP	Released: 2000; Label: Independent; Formats: Physical	—
Gåte EP	Released: 2002; Label: Warner Music Norway; Formats: Physical, digital download, streaming	2
Statt opp (Maggeduliadei)	Released: 2003; Label: Warner Music Norway; Formats: Physical, digital download, streaming	4
Attersyn	Released: 3 November 2017; Label: Drabant Music; Formats: Physical, digital download, streaming	—
Til Nord	Released: 21 May 2021; Formats: Physical, digital download, streaming	—
Vandrar	Released: 12 December 2023; Label: Indie Recordings; Formats: Physical, digital download, streaming	—
"—" denotes an extended play that did not chart or was not released in that territory.

=== Singles ===
Single	Year	Peak chart positions		Album or EP
Single	Year	NOR	LTU	Album or EP
"Sjå attende"	2004	10	—	Iselilja
"Iselilja" (with The Blizzard)	2009	—	—	Non-album single
"Stolt solvår"	2017	—	—	Attersyn
"Rideboll og gullborg"	2017	—	—	Attersyn
"Kom no disjka"	2018	—	—	Svevn
"Bannlyst"	2018	—	—	Svevn
"Tonen"	2018	—	—	Svevn
"Huldra"	2019	—	—	Ulveham
"Svarteboka" (featuring Djerv)	2023	—	—	Vandrar and Ulveham
"Skarvane"	2023	—	—	Vandrar and Ulveham
"Ulveham"	2024	— (Note: "Ulveham" did not enter the official Topplista Top 40 Singles Chart, but peaked at number 23 on the Topplista Top 40 Radio Airplay chart.)	91	Vandrar and Ulveham
"På veg"	2024	—	—	Non-album single
"Sannsiger"	2026	—	—	Sigil
"Oskorsreia"	2026	—	—	Sigil
"Strandvaskar"	2026	—	—	Sigil
"Mi jord"	2026	—	—	Sigil
"—" denotes a recording that did not chart or was not released in that territory.

=== Other charted songs ===
Single	Year	Peak chart positions	Album or EP
Single	Year	NOR	Album or EP
"Førnesbrunen" Radio edit	2023	10	Vandrar

== Notes ==
Awards
Preceded by Sondre Lerche	Recipient of the Newcomer Spellemannprisen; 2002	Succeeded by Julian Berntzen
Preceded by Alessandra with "Queen of Kings"	Norway in the Eurovision Song Contest; 2024	Succeeded by Kyle Alessandro with "Lighter"
