= Ulveham =

2023 song by Gåte

Single by Gåte

from the EP Vandrar
- Language: Norwegian (Note: On the first release, most of the lyrics are based on a mid-19th-century dialect from Vest-Telemark. The current release is closer to High Norwegian or Nynorsk.)
- Released: 12 December 2023
- Genre: Norwegian folk; folk rock; kulokk
- Length: 5:47 (EP); 3:00 (single); 3:02 (rerelease)
- Label: Indie Recordings
- Songwriters: Erlend Skjetne; Gunnhild Sundli; Magnus Børmark; Jon Even Schärer; Marit Jensen Lillebuen; Ronny Graff Janssen; Sveinung Ekloo Sundli
- Lyricist: Traditional
- Producers: Sveinung Sundli; Magnus Børmark; Tobias Østerdal; Marit Jensen Lillebuen

Gåte singles chronology
"Svarteboka" (2023)	"Ulveham" (2023)	"På veg" (2025)

Music video
- "Ulveham" on YouTube

Eurovision Song Contest 2024 entry
- Country: Norway
- Artist: Gåte
- Language: Norwegian
- Composers: Erlend Skjetne; Gunnhild Sundli; Magnus Børmark; Jon Even Schärer; Marit Jensen Lillebuen; Ronny Graff Janssen; Sveinung Ekloo Sundli
- Lyricists: Erlend Skjetne; Gunnhild Sundli; Magnus Børmark; Jon Even Schärer; Marit Jensen Lillebuen; Ronny Graff Janssen; Sveinung Ekloo Sundli

Finals performance
- Semi-final result: 10th
- Semi-final points: 43
- Final result: 25th
- Final points: 16

Entry chronology
- ◄ "Queen of Kings" (2023)
- "Lighter" (2025) ►

Official performance video
- "Ulveham" (Second Semi-Final) on YouTube "Ulveham" (Grand Final) on YouTube

"Ulveham" (pronounced [ˈʉ̂ɫvəˌhɑm]; Norwegian for 'Wolf Pelt') is a song by Norwegian folk rock and metal band Gåte. It was originally released 12 December 2023 on the EP Vandrar as a track. It was later shortened and re-published as a single upon its selection to participate in Melodi Grand Prix 2024. The song ultimately won the selection and thus represented Norway in the Eurovision Song Contest 2024. It is Norway's first Eurovision entry since 2006 to be sung in Norwegian, and finished in 25th place at the final with 16 points.

The opening features a traditional kulokk, a herding call, sourced from an old recording featuring Marit Jensen Lillebuen. The story of the lyrics are based on an almost thousand-year-old Scandinavian medieval ballad.

== Background and composition ==
Gåte made a modern interpretation of a Norwegian medieval ballad known as "Møya i ulveham" ("The Maid in Wolf Pelt"). The initial lyrical content draws from a mid-19th-century manuscript from Telemark, reflecting a distinctive variant of the Vest-Telemark dialect. Several stanzas were identical to those found in the original manuscript. In "Ulveham", the stanzas were restructured and their language simplified, moving closer to the standardised High Norwegian or Nynorsk.

"Møya i ulveham" tells the story of a young maiden, who is transformed into a needle, a knife, and then a sword by her evil stepmother. However, the people continue to appreciate her throughout all of her transformations, angering her stepmother. Therefore, to punish her even further, the stepmother transforms her into a wolf. It ends with the stepmother, pregnant with a child, being pounced on by the wolf. To lift the curse, the wolf drinks her stepmother's blood, which contains the blood of her unborn half-brother.

"Ulveham" opens with a traditional kulokk, a herding call traditionally used to summon livestock, sourced from an early 20th-century recording featuring folk singer Marit Jensen Lillebuen. The musical composition incorporates electronic beats and various instruments, such as nyckelharpa, electric guitars, and drums. It uses metal growling with lyrics as background vocalisation.

There is a prevalence of similar ballads in Danish and Swedish traditions. The Danish rendition, titled "Jomfruen i ulveham" ("The Virgin in Wolf Pelt"), and the Swedish versions, where a young man undergoes transformation into a wolf in "Den förtrollade riddaren" ("The Bewitched Knight"), underscore the cross-cultural resonance of this narrative.

== Eurovision Song Contest ==
=== Melodi Grand Prix 2024 ===
"Ulveham" was selected to participate in Melodi Grand Prix 2024 and was the last performing entry in the event's second semi-final on 20 January 2024. The song was one of three that progressed to the final in Trondheim Spektrum on 3 February. In the weeks leading up to the final, the song advanced with the betting odds, and became the favourite to win by the time of the final. It ultimately won the competition and earned the right to represent Norway in the Eurovision Song Contest 2024.

==== Lyric changes ====
In Melodi Grand Prix and Eurovision Song Contest, the rules require that both text and melody must be original and not previously published. As "Ulveham" contains lyrics taken from an almost thousand-year-old ballad, this would violate the contest's rules. In order to avoid problems with the song's possible participation in the Eurovision Song Contest, the Norwegian broadcaster NRK checked with the European Broadcasting Union (EBU), which organises the event. After an assessment, the EBU concluded that Marit Jensen Lillebuen's kulning recording could be accepted. To be on the safe side, NRK decided that the entire lyrics of "Ulveham" would be replaced with newly-written and original lyrics. MGP manager Stig Karlsen stated that "the song's title and historical theme" would remain.

On 2 February 2024, a revised version of "Ulveham" was released, with reorganised and modified lyrics. It features other small excerpts from the same ballad, with altered wording to avoid resemblance. Three of the band members, Gunnhild Sundli, Magnus Børmark, and Jon Even Schärer, contributed to the writing of the new lyrics.

=== At Eurovision ===
According to Eurovision rules, all nations with the exceptions of the host country and the "Big Five" (France, Germany, Italy, Spain and the United Kingdom) are required to qualify from one of two semi-finals in order to compete in the final; the top ten countries from each semi-final progress to the final. On 30 January 2024, an allocation draw was held to determine which of the two semi-finals, as well as which half of the show, each country will perform in; the EBU split up the competing countries into different pots based on voting patterns from previous contests, with countries with favourable voting histories put into the same pot. Norway was scheduled for the second half of the second semi-final, held on 9 May 2024, where it qualified for the final. The song was performed at the Eurovision 2024 final, finishing last of the 25 competing songs.

== Charts ==
Chart performance for "Ulveham"
Chart (2024)	Peak position
Lithuania (AGATA)	91
Norway Airplay (VG-lista)	23

== Release history ==
Release dates and formats for "Ulveham"
Region	Date	Format(s)	Label	Type
Various	12 December 2023	Digital download; streaming	Indie Recordings	Track from EP
Various	5 January 2024	Digital download; streaming	Indie Recordings	Single (original)
Various	2 February 2024	Digital download; streaming	Indie Recordings	Single (rerelease)

== See also ==
- Vedergällningen (1999) - Song by Swedish folk rock group Garmarna based on the Swedish version "Den förtrollade riddaren" of the same medieval ballad.
