= Liva (album) =

Live album by Gåte
- Released: 2006
- Recorded: December 30, 2005 at Rockefeller, Oslo
- Genre: Folk-rock
- Length: 53:34
- Label: Warner Music Norway

Gåte chronology
Iselilja (2004)	Liva (2006)	Svevn (2018)

Professional ratings
Review scores
Source	Rating
Verdens gang	5/6 stars
Adresseavisen	

Liva is the first live album released by the Norwegian band Gåte, and was recorded on December 30, 2005 at Rockefeller Music Hall, Oslo, Norway.

== Track listing ==
1. "Knut Liten og Sylvelin"
2. "Kjærleik"
3. "Følgje"
4. "Venelite"
5. "Du som er ung"
6. "Stengd dør"
7. "Liti Kjersti"
8. "Fredlysning"
9. "Bendik og Årolilja"
10. "Margit Hjukse"
11. "Sjå attende"

== Charts ==
Chart (2006)	Peak position
Norwegian Albums (VG-lista)	15
