= Lighter (Kyle Alessandro song) =

2025 single by Kyle Alessandro

Single by Kyle Alessandro
- Released: 24 January 2025
- Genre: Pop
- Length: 2:55
- Label: Warner Music
- Songwriters: Kyle Alessandro; Adam Woods
- Producers: Kyle Alessandro; Adam Woods

Kyle Alessandro singles chronology
"Pulse" (2024)	"Lighter" (2025)	"Model" (2025)

Music video
- "Lighter" on YouTube

Alternate music video
- "Lighter" on YouTube

Eurovision Song Contest 2025 entry
- Country: Norway
- Artist: Kyle Alessandro
- Language: English
- Composers: Kyle Alessandro; Adam Woods
- Lyricists: Kyle Alessandro; Adam Woods

Finals performance
- Semi-final result: 8th
- Semi-final points: 82
- Final result: 18th
- Final points: 89

Entry chronology
- ◄ "Ulveham" (2024)
- "Ya Ya Ya" (2026) ►

Official performance video
- "Lighter" (First Semi-Final) on YouTube "Lighter" (Grand Final) on YouTube

"Lighter" is a song by Norwegian singer and songwriter Kyle Alessandro. The song was released on 24 January 2025 through Warner Music Norway and was written and produced by Alessandro and Adam Woods. After winning Melodi Grand Prix 2025, it represented Norway in the Eurovision Song Contest 2025, where it placed 18th with 89 points.

The song was inspired by Alessandro's mother and her battles with cancer, with the song advocating for persistence through hard times and to be one's true self. To promote the song, a music video alongside several variations of the song were released. "Lighter" received mixed reception from critics. Some praised Alessandro's vocal ability and the song's overall message, but criticism was levied towards the lyrical content and perceived generic and dated nature of the song compared to others competing at that year's Eurovision. The song enjoyed commercial success in numerous countries. "Lighter" peaked at number two in Lithuania and number four in Greece. It additionally peaked within the top ten in three more countries, including its native Norway.

== Background and composition ==
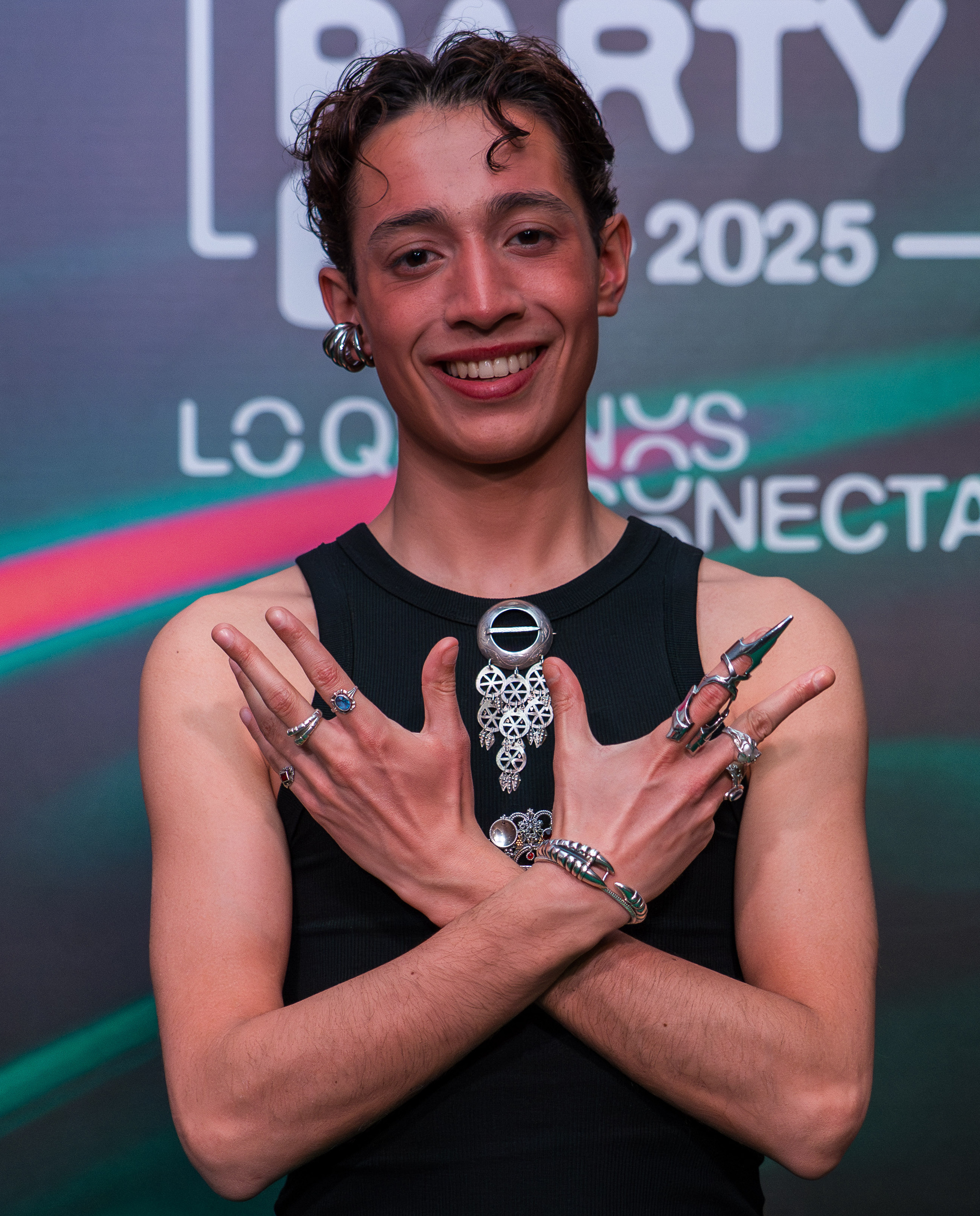
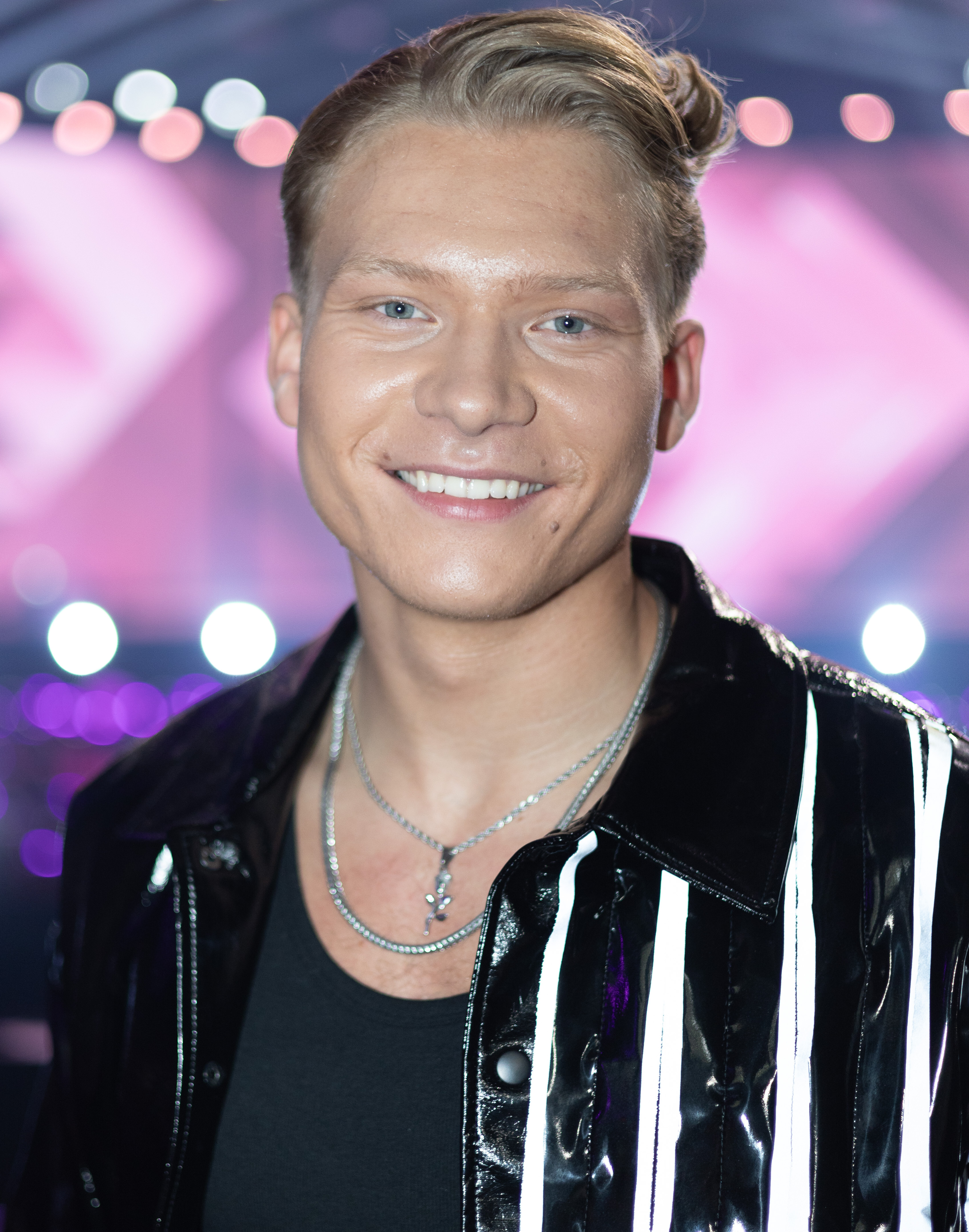
"Lighter" was co-written and co-produced by Kyle Alessandro (left) and Adam Woods (right).

"Lighter" was co-written and co-produced by Kyle Alessandro and Adam Woods. Prior to the release of "Lighter", Alessandro had previously tried to enter Eurovision for Norway in 2023, competing with boy band Unami Tsunami with "Geronimo". The song has been described by various media outlets as a mixture various styles of music, with varying sources noting a mixture of styles including baroque, Norwegian folk, rumba flamenca, and pop music within the song. The song was released on 24 January 2025 along with all other songs competing in Melodi Grand Prix 2025, Norway's national final to select its entrant for the Eurovision Song Contest 2025.

According to Alessandro, the song's theme is inspired by his mother's battle with cancer. In multiple interviews, Alessandro stated that after his mother was given a cancer diagnosis with six months to live, she told him to persist throughout his life and to maintain his own light at all costs. Additionally, Alessandro stated in an interview with Aftenposten that he wanted to address masculine gender norms, over-masculinity, and the increased struggle for men to find romantic relationships, advocating for better respect for women by men. He further addressed the rise in popularity of conservative personalities focusing on masculinity, describing the rise of conservative influencers such as Jordan Peterson and Andrew Tate as an echo chamber. In an analysis from Wiwibloggs' Ruxandra Tudor, they described the song as a story of a person who was deceived in a bad relationship; regardless, the person ends up finding their light by "self-strength and motivation" and not depending on others.

== Music video and promotion ==
Along with the song's release, an accompanying music video was released on 12 March 2025. To promote the song, Alessandro embarked on a promotional tour prior to Eurovision. Alessandro participated at various Eurovision pre-parties during the months of March and April 2025, including the Nordic Eurovision Party on 22 March, Eurovision in Concert on 5 April, the London Eurovision Party on 13 April, and Pre-Party ES on 19 April. Additionally, Alessandro released several versions of "Lighter" before the contest, including an acoustic version and a remix with Norwegian DJ Matoma on 28 March and 9 May, respectively. On 18 April, an alternate music video featuring an orchestral version of the song performed by the Norwegian Radio Orchestra (KORK) was released, which had been recorded earlier on 31 March.

== Critical reception ==
=== Norwegian media and personalities ===
"Lighter" received mixed reviews from critics. Aftenposten's Robert Hoftun Gjestad rated "Lighter" a five out of six, praising Alessandro's vocals and the song's message but admitting that "winning seems unlikely". Dagbladet's Ralf Lofstad rated the song five out of six, praising the song's chorus and Alessandro's vocal abilities. TV 2 Direkte's Christoffer Gunnestad also rated the song a five out of six, praising Alessandro's "empathy and delivery" but also admitted that they felt that the song was "too anonymous" to stand out at Eurovision. Verdens Gang's Tor Martin Bøe rated the song a two out of six, describing "Lighter" as an "ambitious song with clear-cut vocals". He further criticised the song's metaphors of not being able to burn despite the song advocating for being your own "lighter". NRK's Sofie Martesdatter Granberg and Jim Ødegaard Pedersen praised the song's lyrics and musical composition, calling it a contender to win at Melodi Grand Prix 2025. However, they admitted that they felt the song "seems a little too unsure of what it wants to be". Se og Hør's Nikolaj Bonde praised the song for its "slick pop pulses", writing that Alessandro "lights all the right fires". Norwegian talk show host Einar Tørnquist stated on Twitter that the song was "one of the weakest" songs Norway had sent to Eurovision; he later deleted his comments to "avoid 'man in his 40s sulking' news stories" according to a Nettavisen interview.

=== International and Eurovision-related media ===
In a Wiwibloggs review containing several reviews from several critics, the song was rated 6.37 out of 10 points, earning 18th out of the 37 songs competing in that year's Eurovision in the site's annual ranking. ESC Beat's Doron Lahav ranked the song 22nd overall, praising the song's violin elements but criticising the chorus for not having enough energy. Jon O'Brien, a writer for Vulture, ranked the song 25th overall, praising the song's background and lyrical meaning but criticising the musical composition for being "lightweight" and generic, describing it as "a formulaic synth-pop bop performed by a Troye Sivan–esque twink". Rob Picheta, writer for American outlet CNN, ranked it 17th out of the 26 finalists in Eurovision 2025, criticising the lyrics for "read[ing] like they’ve been put through Google Translate 16 times". The Times' Ed Potton ranked it 11th out of the 26 finalists, ranking it three out of five stars and describing it as a "pyromaniac hum-along". Yle's Eva Frantz gave the song a 6 out of 10 rating, writing that the song's result in the contest "stands and falls with its staging", stating that it depended on "if Alessandro manages to activate his Alexander Rybak-esque charm" to stand out at the competition.

The Daily Telegraph's Neil McCormick wrote that the song was "setting a very low bar [in the contest], with a grandiose but tuneless and utterly vapid mid-tempo techno stomp". The Guardian's Martin Belam compared the song to Olly Alexander's "Dizzy", criticising the usage of autotune within the song's studio version. He later added that Alessandro "seems to have listened to Olly Alexander’s Dizzy from last year, saw that it achieved very little in terms of points, and then decided 'We’ll have ourselves a bit of that for 2025' regardless". The Yorkshire Post's Benjamin Jackson stated that the song was "rather dated" and that it was "perhaps more fitting for the boy band era of 20 years ago". Observador's Susana Verde wrote that the song was "good for shaking hips, whether they're baroque or not, but little more than that", describing the theme of the song as "so-so". Harmen van Dijk, Peter van der Lint, and Nienke Schipper from Dutch newspaper Trouw highlighted Latin music elements within the song, writing that it was something "you have to love". De Telegraaf's Richard van de Crommert criticised the song for being too generic and described it as an "Eurovision unit-sausage", stating that while the song overall was good, "'Lighter' does not surprise one bit". Eurovision Stars' Jon Lewak compared the song to "pop music from the late-90’s or early noughts", stating that Alessandro had the "talent and professionality to deliver well". However, he criticised the song's ending for having "a chorus and a half".

== Eurovision Song Contest ==
=== Melodi Grand Prix 2025 ===
Norway's national broadcaster, the Norwegian Broadcasting Corporation (NRK), organised Melodi Grand Prix 2025, the 63rd iteration of the national final to select Norway's representative for the Eurovision Song Contest. The competition featured nine songs in a singular grand final on 15 February 2025, with the winner being decided by a 40/60 split of professional juries and public televoting, respectively.

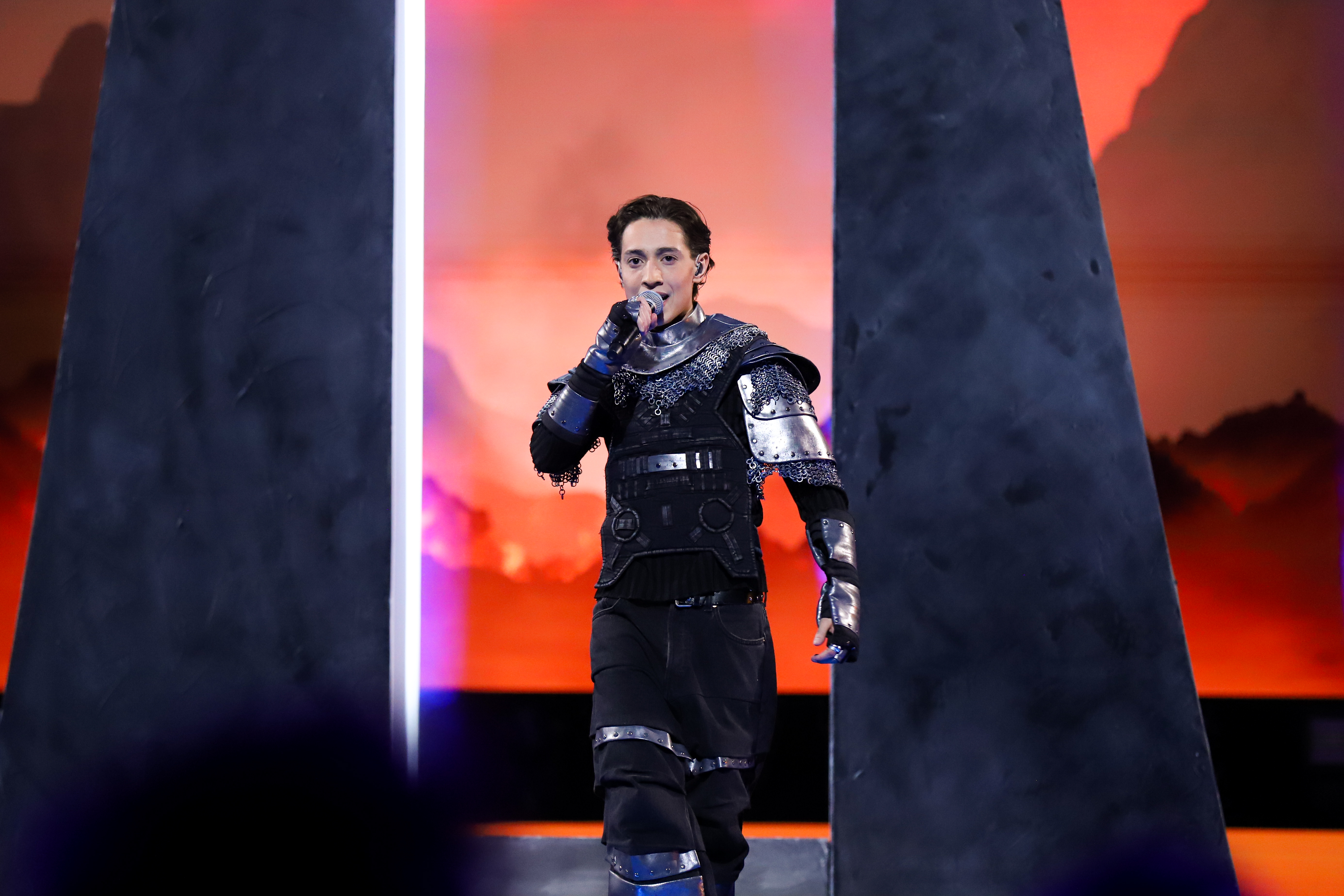
Alessandro performing at Melodi Grand Prix 2025.

Alessandro was officially announced as a participant in Melodi Grand Prix 2025 on 16 January 2025. He was drawn to perform in the sixth position. In the final, he finished in first in both the jury and televote categories, earning 118 and 189 points in their respective categories for a total of 307 points. The total was 117 more than the runner-up song, Nataleen's "The Game". As a result of winning the competition, he earned the right to perform as the Norwegian entrant for the Eurovision Song Contest 2025.

=== At Eurovision ===
The Eurovision Song Contest 2025 took place at the St. Jakobshalle in Basel, Switzerland, and consisted of two semi-finals held on the respective dates of 13 and 15 May and the final on 17 May 2025. During the allocation draw held on 28 January 2025, Norway was drawn to compete in the first semi-final, performing in the second half of the show. Alessandro was later drawn to perform in eighth, after Portugal's Napa and before Belgium's Red Sebastian.

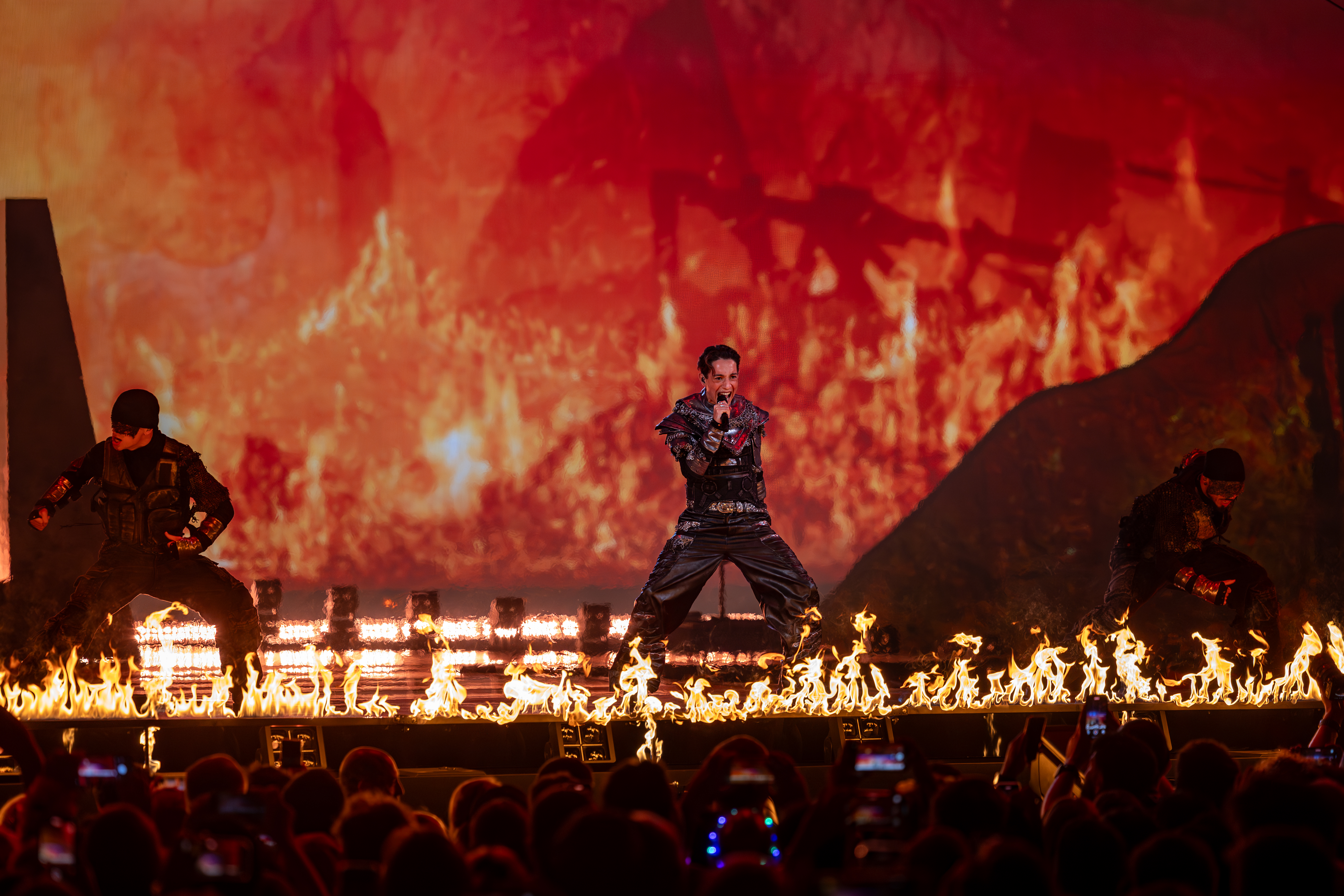
Alessandro performing "Lighter" at a Eurovision dress rehearsal before the grand final.

For its Eurovision performance, Mona Berntsen was appointed as the staging director. The performance featured Alessandro alongside three backing dancers: Reno Andersen, Daniel Grindeland, and Oliver Paulsson. In addition, two backing singers (Sondrey and Frode Vassel) were also featured. The song's Eurovision performance was described by Alessandro as an upgraded version from the song's Melodi Grand Prix performance. Alessandro wore black and silver armour similar to the armour worn at Melodi Grand Prix; the costume was modified after fears of it being similar to fellow competitor Parg's outfit for Eurovision. The background features depictions of a "post-apocalyptic" mountain range and the usage of two large props made to represent Viking runestones. Throughout the performance, Alessandro performs a variety of dance routines. Heavy use of pyrotechnics and flames are used throughout the second half of the performance. Nearing the end, Grindeland performs a dance-break routine for approximately 30 seconds. "Lighter" secured a position in the grand final, finishing in eighth in its semi-final with 82 points.

Reactions to the performance were mixed. The Daily Telegraph's Neil McCormick heavily criticised Alessandro's outfit, describing it as a "blandly handsome appearance of an AI-generated avatar for a computer game confusingly set in a version of medieval Norway where the Vikings have been supplanted by ninjas". Aftenposten's Robert Hoftun Gjestad praised Alessandro's live vocals and the performance's choreography, describing the performance as a "fiery tribute to his former cancer-stricken mum". NRK's Jim Ødegård Pedersen praised the performance for Alessandro's stage presence, stating that Alessandro showed "strength and a warlike attitude" in telling the song's story. The Independent's Mark Beaumont compared Alessandro to "Elliot Page starring in a musical Dune", stating that the performance contributed to a sci-fi theme comparable to other songs in the Eurovision grand final.

Alessandro performed a repeat of his performance on 17 May. The song performed as the opener for the grand final, before Luxembourg's Laura Thorn. After the results were announced, Alessandro finished in 18th with 89 points, with a split score of 22 jury points and 67 televoting points. Alessandro did not receive any sets of 12 points in either category. Regarding the former, the highest amount of points awarded was two sets of six points from Czechia and Iceland. In the televote, the highest amount of points was a set of ten points from Ukraine. In response to his result, Alessandro stated to Aftenposten that "It's better than last place", commending his televote result of 12th. He further added that he felt "lucky to be here at all".

== Track listing ==
Digital download/streaming

1. "Lighter" – 2:55

Digital download/streaming – Acoustic version

1. "Lighter" (acoustic version) – 3:14

Digital download/streaming – Matoma remix

1. "Lighter" (Matoma remix) – 3:14

Digital download/streaming – From NRK-scenen

1. "Lighter" (from NRK scenen) – 2:59

== Credits and personnel ==
Credits adapted from Tidal.

- Kyle Alessandro – vocals, production, songwriter
- Adam Woods – songwriter
- Bjørn Engelmann – master engineering
- Simon Bergseth – mix engineering

== Charts ==
=== Weekly charts ===
Weekly chart performance for "Lighter"
Chart (2025)	Peak position
Austria (Ö3 Austria Top 40)	14
Finland (Suomen virallinen lista)	18
Germany (GfK)	68
Global Excl. US (Billboard)	172
Greece International (IFPI)	4
Iceland (Tónlistinn)	6
Latvia Streaming (LaIPA)	7
Lithuania (AGATA)	2
Netherlands (Single Top 100)	44
Norway (VG-lista)	6
Poland (Polish Streaming Top 100)	21
Sweden (Sverigetopplistan)	19
Switzerland (Schweizer Hitparade)	8
UK Singles Downloads (Official Charts)	77
UK Singles Sales (OCC)	82

=== Year-end charts ===
Year-end chart performance for "Lighter"
Chart (2025)	Peak position
Iceland (Tónlistinn)	67

== Release history ==
Release dates and formats for "Lighter"
Region	Date	Format(s)	Version	Label	Ref.
Various	23 January 2025	Digital download; streaming	Original	Warner	
Various	28 March 2025	Digital download; streaming	Acoustic	Warner	
Various	9 May 2025	Digital download; streaming	Matoma remix	Warner	
Various	13 June 2025	Digital download; streaming	From NRK-scenen	Warner	
