= Sondre Lerche discography =

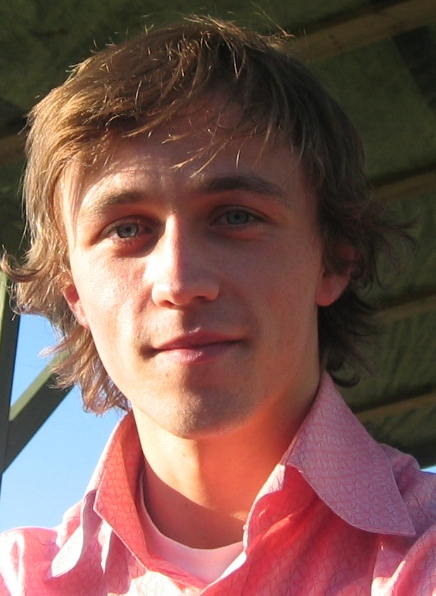
- Studio albums: 11
- EPs: 15
- Soundtrack albums: 3
- Live albums: 1
- Compilation albums: 2
- Singles: 40
- Music videos: 37
- Re-recordings: 1
- Holiday covers: 14

The discography of Norwegian singer-songwriter Sondre Lerche consists of 11 studio albums, one live album, two compilation albums, three soundtrack albums, one re-recorded album, 15 extended plays, 40 singles, 37 music videos, and 14 holiday covers.

Lerche's published music career began in the year 2000 at the age of 17, when he released his debut single, "You Know So Well" in Norway. He had previously started writing songs, including his first song, "Locust Girl", at age 14. The release of Lerche's first full-length album, Faces Down, was delayed to 2001 until he finished schooling; the album debuted at the number two spot on the VG-lista Norwegian charts. His sophomore album, Two Way Monologue, was released in 2004. In 2006, Lerche took a stylistic change into jazz with Duper Sessions, which charted on the American Billboard Jazz charts. This was followed in 2007 by the indie rock album Phantom Punch. In 2009, Lerche released the album Heartbeat Radio, which was followed in 2011 by the self-titled Sondre Lerche.

Lerche started a trilogy of albums with the release of Please in 2014, followed by Pleasure in 2017 and concluding with Patience in 2020. He then released a double album, Avatars of Love, in 2022, the year of his 40th birthday. It was followed in 2026 by the album Acrobats. Lerche's discography has also included several extended plays and a tradition of releasing cover songs as digital singles during the holiday season.

== Albums ==
=== Studio albums ===
Title	Details	Peak chart positions			
Title	Details	NOR	US	US Indie	US Jazz
Faces Down	Released: September 2001; Label: Astralwerks, Virgin; Formats: CD, LP, digital	2	–	–	–
Two Way Monologue	Released: 9 March 2004; Label: Astralwerks, Virgin; Formats: CD, LP, cassette, digital	2	– (Note: Two Way Monologue did not enter the US Billboard 200 but did peak at number 49 on the Heatseekers Albums chart.)	31	–
Duper Sessions (as Sondre Lerche and the Faces Down Quartet)	Released: 27 February 2006; Label: Astralwerks, Virgin; Formats: CD, LP, digital	4	–	–	21
Phantom Punch (as Sondre Lerche and the Faces Down)	Released: 6 February 2007; Label: Astralwerks, EMI; Formats: CD, LP, cassette, digital	5	– (Note: Phantom Punch did not enter the US Billboard 200 but did peak at number 18 on the Heatseekers Albums chart.)	–	–
Heartbeat Radio	Released: 8 September 2009; Label: Rounder; Formats: CD, LP, digital	31	178 (Note: Heartbeat Radio also peaked at number 4 on the Heatseekers Albums chart concurrently.)	–	–
Sondre Lerche	Released: 6 June 2011; Label: Mona, Tellé; Formats: CD, LP, digital	6	183 (Note: Sondre Lerche also peaked at number 8 on the Heatseekers Albums chart concurrently.)	34	–
Please	Released: 23 September 2014; Label: Mona, Yep Roc; Formats: CD, LP, digital	34	– (Note: Please did not enter the US Billboard 200 but did peak at number 32 on the Heatseekers Albums chart.)	–	–
Pleasure	Released: 3 March 2017; Label: PLZ; Formats: CD, LP, digital	–	–	–	–
Patience	Released: 5 June 2020; Label: PLZ; Formats: CD, LP, digital	11	–	–	–
Avatars of Love	Released: 1 April 2022; Label: PLZ, Ingrooves; Formats: CD, LP, digital	4	–	–	–
Acrobats	Released: 21 August 2026; Label: PLZ, Virgin; Formats: CD, LP, digital	–	–	–	–

=== Live album ===
Title	Details
Bootlegs	Released: 4 September 2012; Label: Mona; Formats: CD, LP, digital

=== Compilation albums ===
Title	Details
Avatars of the Night (Note: Avatars of the Night is a compilation album consisting of several remixes, alternate versions, live recordings, demos, and bonus tracks from the studio album Avatars of Love.)	Released: 31 March 2023; Label: PLZ, Ingrooves; Formats: LP, digital
Understudy (Note: Understudy is a compilation album consisting of several tracks from Lerche's annual holiday tradition of covering a pop song from the past year, in conjunction with producer Matias Tellez, since 2013.)	Released: 20 October 2023; Label: PLZ; Formats: LP, digital

=== Soundtrack albums ===
Title	Details	Peak chart positions
Title	Details	US Heat
Dan in Real Life	Released: 2 October 2007; Label: Virgin, Touchstone; Formats: CD, digital	6
The Sleepwalker (with Kato Ådland)	Released: 11 February 2014; Label: Mona, Yep Roc; Formats: LP, digital	–
Er det morgen nå? (with Fantorangen)	Released: 26 September 2018; Label: PLZ; Formats: Digital	–

=== Re-recorded album ===
Title	Details
Solo Pleasure (Note: Solo Pleasure is a re-recorded version of the studio album Pleasure, in a "stripped down" acoustic format. It was first released physically on vinyl in November 2017, before being published to online streaming services in February 2018.)	Released: 24 November 2017 (physical), 14 February 2018 (digital); Label: Analog Spark, PLZ; Formats: LP, digital

== Extended plays ==
Title	Details
You Know So Well	Released: February 2001; Label: Virgin; Formats: CD
No One's Gonna Come EP	Released: June 2001; Label: Virgin; Formats: CD
Sleep on Needles EP	Released: 14 January 2002; Label: Virgin; Formats: CD
Dead Passengers EP	Released: 2002; Label: Source; Formats: CD
Don't Be Shallow	Released: 23 September 2003; Label: Astralwerks; Formats: CD, digital
Two Way Monologue EP	Released: 2004; Label: Virgin; Formats: CD
Polaroid Pool Party EP	Released: August 2008; Label: N/A; Formats: CD
Polaroid Pumpkin Party EP	Released: November 2008; Label: N/A; Formats: CD
Public Hi-Fi Sessions 01	Released: November 2013; Label: Public Hi-Fi; Formats: LP, digital
Covers EP	Released: April 2015; Label: Mona; Formats: Digital
Despite the Night EP	Released: 22 May 2015; Label: Mona; Formats: Digital
Britney	Released: 20 December 2019; Label: PLZ; Formats: Digital
I Shouldn't Have to Spell My Name	Released: 6 December 2024; Label: Flake, PLZ; Formats: CD
Sea of Sighs	Released: 10 January 2025; Label: PLZ; Formats: LP, digital
Turning Up the Heat Again	Released: 7 January 2026; Label: PLZ; Formats: Digital

== Singles ==
List of singles, with selected chart positions, showing year released and album name
Title	Year	Peak chart positions		Album	Ref.
Title	Year	NOR	US Emerging	Album	Ref.
"You Know So Well"	2000	2	–	Faces Down	
"No One's Gonna Come"	2001	6	–	Faces Down	
"Sleep on Needles"	2001	–	–	Faces Down	
"All Luck Ran Out"	2001	–	–	Faces Down	
"Two Way Monologue"	2004	–	–	Two Way Monologue	
"Days That Are Over"	2004	–	–	Two Way Monologue	
"Minor Detail"	2006	–	–	Duper Sessions	
"Phantom Punch"	2006	–	–	Phantom Punch	
"Say It All"	2006	–	–	Phantom Punch	
"The Tape"	2007	–	–	Phantom Punch	
"Heartbeat Radio"	2008	–	–	Heartbeat Radio	
"Domino"	2011	–	–	Sondre Lerche	
"Private Caller"	2011	–	–	Sondre Lerche	
"Øynene lukket" (with Lars Vaular)	2012	–	–	Non-album single	
"It's Never Meant to Be"	2012	–	–	Non-album single	
"The Plague"	2013	–	–	Non-album single	
"Bad Law"	2014	–	19	Please	
"Sentimentalist"	2014	–	–	Please	
"Despite the Night"	2015	–	–	Despite the Night (EP)	
"Soft Feelings"	2017	–	–	Pleasure	
"Violent Game"	2017	–	–	Pleasure	
"I Know Something That's Gonna Break Your Heart"	2017	–	–	Pleasure	
"Serenading in the Trenches"	2017	–	–	Pleasure	
"Slip Into Character"	2019	–	–	Britney (EP)	
"You Are Not Who I Thought I Was"	2020	–	–	Patience	
"Why Would I Let You Go"	2020	–	–	Patience	
"That's All There Is"	2020	–	–	Patience	
"I Could Not Love You Enough"	2020	–	–	Patience (Deluxe Edition)	
"Foreign Heart" (feat. Delicate Steve)	2020	–	–	Patience (Deluxe Edition)	
"King of Letting Go"	2021	–	–	Non-album single	
"Dead of the Night"	2021	–	–	Avatars of Love	
"Cut" / "Turns Out I'm Sentimental After All"	2022	–	–	Avatars of Love	
"Avatars of Love"	2022	–	–	Avatars of Love	
"Summer in Reverse" (feat. CHAI)	2022	–	–	Avatars of Love	
"Den sanne jul"	2024	–	–	Non-album single	
"Showtime 2.1"	2025	–	–	Sea of Sighs (EP)	
"Ler meg ihjel" (with Lars Vaular)	2025	–	–	Non-album single	
"Little Kids"	2026	–	–	Acrobats	
"Follow the River (Single Edit)"	2026	–	–	Acrobats	
"Love Is All"	2026	–	–	Acrobats	

=== Holiday covers ===
Lerche maintains an annual holiday tradition of covering a pop song from the past year, which has been in conjunction with producer Matias Tellez since 2013. They are published as stand-alone digital singles on Bandcamp and released to the music publication Stereogum. Many of these covers were included on the 2015 EP Covers and the 2023 compilation album Understudy. Lerche first began publishing cover songs during the holiday season in 2009, as exclusives for Stereogum, although his partnership with Tellez for an annual tradition did not start until 2013. In 2019, the Britney EP (containing three Britney Spears covers and the original single "Slip Into Character") fulfilled the tradition rather than releasing one single.

List of annual holiday covers, published as digital singles
Title	Year	Original artist	Ref.
"Bluish"	2009	Animal Collective	
"Lewis Takes Off His Shirt"	2010	Owen Pallett	
"Countdown"	2011	Beyoncé	
"Wrecking Ball"	2013	Miley Cyrus	
"Chandelier"	2014	Sia	
"Hotline Bling"	2015	Drake	
"Into You"	2016	Ariana Grande	
"Bad Liar"	2017	Selena Gomez	
"Thank U, Next"	2018	Ariana Grande	
"Rain on Me" / "I Contain Multitudes"	2020	Lady Gaga and Ariana Grande; Bob Dylan	
"Kiss Me More"	2021	Doja Cat (feat. SZA)	
"Anti-Hero"	2022	Taylor Swift	
"Flowers"	2023	Miley Cyrus	
"Good Luck, Babe!"	2024	Chappell Roan	
"Die with a Smile"	2025	Lady Gaga and Bruno Mars	

== Music videos ==
List of music videos, showing year released and director
Title	Year	Director(s)	Ref.
"You Know So Well"	2000	Nathilde Overrein Rapp	
"Sleep on Needles"	2001	Snorre Lærdal; Magnus Martens	
"Two Way Monologue"	2004	Magnus Martens	
"Days That Are Over"	2004	Magnus Martens	
"Minor Detail"	2006	Magnus Martens	
"Phantom Punch"	2006	Kristoffer Borgli	
"Say It All"	2007	Renate Rognan	
"Heartbeat Radio"	2009	Kate Barker-Frøyland	
"If Only"	2010	Celia Rowlson-Hall	
"Private Caller"	2011	Kate Barker-Frøyland	
"Go Right Ahead"	2011	Mona Fastvold	
"Domino"	2011	Mona Fastvold	
"When the River"	2012	Mona Fastvold	
"Øynene lukket" (with Lars Vaular)	2012	Andrew Amorim	
"Bad Law"	2014	Evan Savitt	
"Legends"	2014	Evan Savitt	
"Sentimentalist"	2014	Evan Savitt	
"Lucky Guy"	2015	Marius Hauge	
"I'm Always Watching You"	2016	Johannes Greve Muskat	
"Soft Feelings"	2017	Johannes Greve Muskat	
"Serenading in the Trenches"	2017	Evan Savitt	
"Siamese Twin"	2017	Marius Hauge	
"I Know Something That's Gonna Break Your Heart (Solo)"	2018	Jon Danovic	
"Slip Into Character"	2019	Jon Danovic	
"You Are Not Who I Thought I Was"	2020	Jon Danovic	
"Why Would I Let You Go"	2020	Jon Danovic	
"That's All There Is"	2020	Jon Danovic	
"I Can't See Myself Without You"	2020	Jon Danovic	
"Are We Alone Now"	2021	CJ Wallis	
"King of Letting Go"	2021	Jon Danovic	
"Cut"	2022	Jon Danovic	
"Turns Out I'm Sentimental After All"	2022	Jon Danovic	
"Avatars of Love"	2022	CJ Wallis	
"Summer in Reverse" (feat. CHAI)	2022	Marius Hauge	
"Alone in the Night" (feat. Aurora)	2022	William Glandberger	
"Little Kids"	2026	Lea Meyer	
"Drive Me Away From You"	2026	Lea Meyer	

== Other appearances ==
Year	Album	Song	Notes	Ref.
2010	Dinner for Schmucks	"Dear Laughing Doubters"	Film soundtrack album	
2011	Muppets: The Green Album	"Mr. Bassman"	Compilation album/various artists	
2020	Crescendo i gågata: En hyllest til Lillebjørn Nilsen	"Så nære vi var"	Compilation album/various artists	
2021	Songs for Trans Youth	"High School Is Eternal"	Compilation album/various artists	
2021	Chris Holm	"Maybe"	Featured artist (Chris Holm & Orions Belte)	
2022	Covers of Covers	"Townie"	Compilation album/various artists	
2024	Radiant Green	"Virginia"	Featured artist (Bel Canto)	
