= Maskorama =

Norwegian reality singing competition television show

- Genre: Reality competition
- Based on: King of Mask Singer by MBC Entertainment
- Directed by: Silje Nordnes
- Presented by: Silje Nordnes
- Judges: Jan Thomas; Marion Raven; Nicolay Ramm; Robert Stoltenberg; Tete Lidbom; Tone Damli; Leo Ajkic
- Opening theme: "Who Are You" by The Who
- Country of origin: Norway
- Original language: Norwegian
- No. of seasons: 6
- No. of episodes: 36

Production
- Camera setup: Multiple-camera
- Running time: 90 minutes
- Production companies: Monster Media; NRK

Original release
- Network: NRK1
- Release: 7 November 2020 – present

Maskorama is a Norwegian reality singing competition television series based on the South Korean television series King of Mask Singer. The first season premiered on Saturday, 7 November 2020 and concluded on Saturday, 12 December 2020. The second season premiered on Saturday, 6 November 2021 and concluded on 11 December. The third season premiered on 15 October 2022 and concluded on 19 November. The fourth season premiered on 11 November 2023 and concluded on 16 December. The fifth season premiered on 9 November and concluded on 14 December 2024. The sixth season premiered on 8 November 2025 and concluded on 13 December 2025. The seventh season premiered on 24 Octobber 2026 and concluded on 28 November 2026.

The show features celebrities singing songs while wearing head-to-toe costumes and face masks concealing their identities. It employs panelists who guess the celebrities identities by interpreting clues provided to them throughout the series.

== Host and panelists ==
Presenter Silje Nordnes is the main host of the show in addition to serving as an executive producer and director. The panelists consisted of stylist Jan Thomas, singer Marion Ravn, and comedian Nicolay Ramm. Starting with the fourth season, Robert Stoltenberg and Tete Lidbom replaced Thomas and Ramm, while both Nordnes and Ravn stayed on. Starting with the sixth season, Tone Damli replaced Ravn. Starting with the seventh season, Leo Ajkic replaced Lidbom.

== Series overview ==
Series overview
Series	Celebrities	Episodes	Originally released		Winner	Runner-up	Third place
Series	Celebrities	Episodes	First released	Last released	Winner	Runner-up	Third place
1	8	6	7 November 2020	12 December 2020	Ulrikke Brandstorp as "Trollet"	Markus Bailey as "Elgen"	Herman Dahl as "Vikingen"
2	8	6	6 November 2021	11 December 2021	Didrik Solli-Tangen as "Snømonsteret"	Victor Sotberg as "Dragen"	Ingeborg Walther as "Bamsen"
3	8	6	15 October 2022	19 November 2022	Bilal Saab as "Zombien"	Daniel Kvammen as “Ulven"	Øystein Pettersen as "Rabagasten"
4	8	6	11 November 2023	16 December 2023	Kevin Vågenes as "Kattepusen"	Linnéa Myhre as "Spirrevippen"	Charlotte Frogner as "Spøkelset"
5	7	6	9 November 2024	14 December 2024	Kim Wigaard as "Stein"	Danby Choi as "Moskusen"	Tone Damli as "Gladfisken"
6	7	6	8 November 2025	13 December 2025	PelleK as "Brokkolien"	Christine Dancke as "Hundevalpen"	Emma Gunnarsen as "Marionetten"
7	8	6	24 October 2026	28 November 2026	TBA	TBA	TBA

== Season 1 (2020) ==
=== Contestants ===
Stage name	Celebrity	Occupation	Episodes					
Stage name	Celebrity	Occupation	1	2	3	4	5	6
Troll (Trollet)	Ulrikke Brandstorp	Singer/Actress	SAFE	SAFE	SAFE	SAFE	SAFE	WINNER
Moose (Elgen)	Markus Bailey	Comedian/TV Presenter	SAFE	SAFE	SAFE	SAFE	SAFE	RUNNER-UP
Viking (Vikingen)	Herman Dahl	YouTuber	SAFE	SAFE	SAFE	SAFE	SAFE	THIRD
Raven (Ravnen)	Anne Rimmen	TV Presenter	SAFE	SAFE	SAFE	SAFE	OUT	
Unicorn (Enhjørningen)	Inger Lise Rypdal	Singer/Actress	SAFE	SAFE	SAFE	OUT		
Poodle (Puddelen)	Mia Gundersen	Singer/Actress	SAFE	(Note: Puddelen gained immunity for one week due to contracting COVID which meant she was safe from elimination until the third episode.)	OUT			
Scarecrow (Fugleskremselet)	Trygve Slagsvold Vedum	Politician	SAFE	OUT				
Lynx (Gaupa)	Susann Goksør Bjerkrheim	Handball Player	OUT					

The masked singer was safe from elimination.
The masked singer was eliminated from the competition and unmasked upon their elimination.

=== Episodes ===
==== Week 1 (7 November) ====
Performances on the first episode
#	Stage name	Song	Identity	Result
1	Moose	"Get Up (I Feel Like Being a) Sex Machine" by James Brown	undisclosed	SAFE
2	Scarecrow	"Jovial" by Freddy Kalas	undisclosed	SAFE
3	Unicorn	"7 rings" by Ariana Grande	undisclosed	SAFE
4	Raven	"Sweet Dreams (Are Made of This)" by Eurythmics	undisclosed	SAFE
5	Viking	"All Around the World" by Justin Bieber feat. Ludacris	undisclosed	SAFE
6	Poodle	"Me Too" by Meghan Trainor	undisclosed	SAFE
7	Lynx	"Spice Up Your Life" by Spice Girls	Susann Goksør Bjerkrheim	OUT
8	Troll	"I Believe in a Thing Called Love" by The Darkness	undisclosed	SAFE

==== Week 2 (14 November) ====
Performances on the second episode (Note: There was 6 performances instead of 7, due to the celebrity behind Puddelen having to quarantine due contracting COVID. She was safe and appeared in the next episode due to getting a negative test.)
#	Stage name	Song	Identity	Result
1	Raven	"Can't Get You Out of My Head" by Kylie Minogue	undisclosed	SAFE
2	Moose	"Roses" by Outkast	undisclosed	SAFE
3	Troll	"Don't You Worry 'bout a Thing" by Tori Kelly	undisclosed	SAFE
4	Viking	"You've Got a Friend in Me" by Randy Newman	undisclosed	SAFE
5	Scarecrow	"Langt å gå" by Klovner I Kamp	Trygve Slagsvold Vedum	OUT
6	Unicorn	"California Dreamin'" by The Mamas & the Papas	undisclosed	SAFE

==== Week 3 (21 November) ====
Performances on the third episode
#	Stage name	Song	Identity	Result
1	Unicorn	"River" by Bishop Briggs	undisclosed	SAFE
2	Viking	"Fredag" by Kjartan Lauritzen	undisclosed	SAFE
3	Poodle	"Toxic" by Britney Spears	Mia Gundersen	OUT
4	Raven	"Waka Waka (This Time for Africa)" by Shakira & Freshlyground	undisclosed	SAFE
5	Troll	"Euphoria" by Loreen	undisclosed	SAFE
6	Moose	"Get Ur Freak On" by Missy Elliott	undisclosed	SAFE

==== Week 4 (28 November) ====
Performances on the fourth episode
#	Stage name	Song	Identity	Result
1	Troll	"Uptown Funk" by Mark Ronson feat. Bruno Mars	undisclosed	SAFE
1	Troll	"Never Enough" by Loren Allred	undisclosed	SAFE
2	Raven	"bad guy" by Billie Eilish	undisclosed	SAFE
2	Raven	"Happy" by Pharrell Williams	undisclosed	SAFE
3	Viking	"Vi er perfekt men verden er ikke det" by Cezinando	undisclosed	SAFE
3	Viking	"Can't Stop the Feeling!" by Justin Timberlake	undisclosed	SAFE
4	Moose	"Take Me Out" by Franz Ferdinand	undisclosed	SAFE
4	Moose	"Party Rock Anthem" by LMFAO	undisclosed	SAFE
5	Unicorn	"Girl on Fire" by Alicia Keys	Inger Lise Rypdal	OUT
5	Unicorn	"(Where Do I Begin?) Love Story" by Regine Velasquez	Inger Lise Rypdal	OUT

==== Week 5 (5 December) ====
Performances on the fifth episode
#	Stage name	Song	Identity	Result
1	Troll	"Fångad av en stormvind" by Carola Häggkvist	undisclosed	SAFE
2	Raven	"Faith" by George Michael	Anne Rimmen	OUT
3	Viking	"Tenke sjæl" by Trond-Viggo Torgersen	undisclosed	SAFE
4	Moose	"Location" by Khalid	undisclosed	SAFE
5	Troll & Espen Grjotheim	"The Prayer" by Celine Dion & Andrea Bocelli		
6	Raven & Knut Anders Sørum	"Kids" by Robbie Williams & Kylie Minogue		
7	Moose & Raylee	"Burning Down the House" by Talking Heads		
8	Viking & Ulrikke Brandstorp	"Urettferdig" by Hkeem & Unge Ferrari		

==== Week 6 (12 December) - Finale ====
- Group Performance: "The Greatest Show" from The Greatest Showman

Performances on the final episode
#	Stage name	Song	Identity	Result
Round One
1	Moose	"Gold Digger" by Kanye West feat. Jamie Foxx	undisclosed	SAFE
2	Viking	"Fy Faen" by Hkeem & Temur	Herman Dahl	THIRD
3	Troll	"Higher Love" by Kygo & Whitney Houston	undisclosed	SAFE
Round Two
1	Moose	"I'm Too Sexy" by Right Said Fred	Markus Bailey	RUNNER-UP
2	Troll	"I'll Be There for You" by The Rembrandts	Ulrikke Brandstorp	WINNER

== Season 2 (2021) ==
=== Contestants ===
Stage name	Celebrity	Occupation	Episodes					
Stage name	Celebrity	Occupation	1	2	3	4	5	6
Snow Monster (Snømonsteret)	Didrik Solli-Tangen	Singer	SAFE	SAFE	SAFE	SAFE	SAFE	WINNER
Dragon (Dragen)	Victor Sotberg	Youtuber	SAFE	SAFE	SAFE	SAFE	SAFE	RUNNER-UP
Teddy Bear (Bamsen)	Ingeborg Walther	Singer	SAFE	SAFE	SAFE	SAFE	SAFE	THIRD
Nixie (Nøkken)	Margaret Berger	Singer	SAFE	SAFE	SAFE	SAFE	OUT	
Nisse (Nissen)	Abid Raja	Politician	SAFE	SAFE	SAFE	OUT		
Mermaid (Havfrua)	Haddy Njie	Singer	SAFE	SAFE	OUT			
Lucky Pig (Heldiggrisen)	Christian Ringnes	Businessman	SAFE	OUT				
Frog (Frosken)	Arve Juritzen	Journalist	OUT					

The masked singer was safe from elimination.
The masked singer was eliminated from the competition and unmasked upon their elimination.

=== Episodes ===
==== Week 1 (6 November) ====
Performances on the first episode
#	Stage name	Song	Identity	Result
1	Snow Monster	"Into the Unknown" by Panic! at the Disco	undisclosed	SAFE
2	Frog	"Should I Stay or Should I Go" by The Clash	Arve Juritzen	OUT
3	Nixie	"Human" by Rag'n'Bone Man	undisclosed	SAFE
4	Lucky Pig	"Money, Money, Money" by ABBA	undisclosed	SAFE
5	Dragon	"I Wanna Be Your Slave" by Måneskin	undisclosed	SAFE
6	Mermaid	"Sparkling Diamonds" by Nicole Kidman	undisclosed	SAFE
7	Nisse	"SexyBack" by Justin Timberlake	undisclosed	SAFE
8	Teddy Bear	"Shake It Off" by Taylor Swift	undisclosed	SAFE

==== Week 2 (13 November) ====
Performances on the second episode
#	Stage name	Song	Identity	Result
1	Nixie	"I Have Nothing" by Whitney Houston	undisclosed	SAFE
2	Lucky Pig	"Itsy Bitsy Teenie Weenie Yellow Polkadot Bikini" by Brian Hyland	Christian Ringnes	OUT
3	Snow Monster	"Leave the Door Open" by Silk Sonic	undisclosed	SAFE
4	Mermaid	"How Far I'll Go" by Auliʻi Cravalho	undisclosed	SAFE
5	Dragon	"Look What You Made Me Do" by Taylor Swift	undisclosed	SAFE
6	Nisse	"Hey Ya!" by Outkast	undisclosed	SAFE
7	Teddy Bear	"Roar" by Katy Perry	undisclosed	SAFE

==== Week 3 (20 November) ====
Performances on the third episode
#	Stage name	Song	Identity	Result
1	Mermaid	"Strong Enough" by Cher	Haddy Njie	OUT
2	Nixie	"Creme De La Creme" by Kamelen	undisclosed	SAFE
3	Dragon	"Rise Like a Phoenix" by Conchita Wurst	undisclosed	SAFE
4	Teddy Bear	"Livin' on a Prayer" by Bon Jovi	undisclosed	SAFE
5	Nisse	"I Like to Move It" by will.i.am	undisclosed	SAFE
6	Snow Monster	"Grace Kelly" by Mika	undisclosed	SAFE

==== Week 4 (27 November) ====
Performances on the fourth episode
#	Stage name	Song	Identity	Result
1	Dragon	"I Love Rock 'n' Roll" by Joan Jett & the Blackhearts	undisclosed	SAFE
1	Dragon	"Go the Distance" by Roger Bart	undisclosed	SAFE
2	Teddy Bear	"Jealous" by Labrinth	undisclosed	SAFE
2	Teddy Bear	"This Is Me" by Keala Settle	undisclosed	SAFE
3	Nisse	"Santa Claus Is Comin' to Town" by Bing Crosby	Abid Raja	OUT
3	Nisse	"Ghostbusters" by Ray Parker Jr.	Abid Raja	OUT
4	Snow Monster	"Dancing On My Own" by Robyn	undisclosed	SAFE
4	Snow Monster	"Skyfall" by Adele	undisclosed	SAFE
5	Nixie	"Samurai Swords" by Highasakite	undisclosed	SAFE
5	Nixie	"Everybody's Free (To Feel Good)" by Kylie Minogue	undisclosed	SAFE

==== Week 5 (4 December) ====
Performances on the fifth episode
#	Stage name	Song	Identity	Result
1	Snow Monster	"Sex on Fire" by Kings of Leon	undisclosed	SAFE
2	Dragon	"Born This Way" by Lady Gaga	undisclosed	SAFE
3	Teddy Bear	"All I Want for Christmas Is You" by Mariah Carey	undisclosed	SAFE
4	Nixie	"Never Really Over" by Katy Perry	Margaret Berger	OUT
5	Dragon & Sandra Lyng	"Lay All Your Love on Me" by ABBA		
6	Teddy Bear & Bilal Saab	"Castle on the Hill" by Ed Sheeran		
7	Nixie & Ulrikke Brandstorp	"Säg mig var du står" by Carola Häggkvist & Zara Larsson		
8	Snow Monster & Marion Ravn	"A Whole New World" by Brad Kane & Lea Salonga		

==== Week 6 (11 December) - Finale ====
- Group Performance: "Don't Stop Me Now" by Queen/"Never Gonna Give You Up" by Rick Astley

Performances on the final episode
#	Stage name	Song	Identity	Result
Round One
1	Teddy Bear	"Love On Top" by Beyoncé	Ingeborg Walther	THIRD
2	Dragon	"Unstoppable" by Sia	undisclosed	SAFE
3	Snow Monster	"Caruso" by Andrea Bocelli	undisclosed	SAFE
Round Two
1	Dragon	"The Show Must Go On" by Queen	Victor Sotberg	RUNNER-UP
2	Snow Monster	"I Wanna Dance with Somebody (Who Loves Me)" by Whitney Houston	Didrik Solli-Tangen	WINNER

== Season 3 (2022) ==
=== Contestants ===
Stage name	Celebrity	Occupation	Episodes					
Stage name	Celebrity	Occupation	1	2	3	4	5	6
Zombie (Zombien)	Bilal Saab	Singer	SAFE	SAFE	SAFE	SAFE	SAFE	WINNER
Wolf (Ulven)	Daniel Kvammen	Musician	SAFE	SAFE	SAFE	SAFE	SAFE	RUNNER-UP
Rascal (Rabagasten)	Øystein Pettersen	Former skier	SAFE	SAFE	SAFE	SAFE	SAFE	THIRD
Hulder (Huldra)	Alexandra Joner	Singer	SAFE	SAFE	SAFE	SAFE	OUT	
Dandy	Maud Angelica Behn	Member of the Royal Family	SAFE	SAFE	SAFE	OUT		
Freyja (Frøya)	Ingrid Gjessing Linhave	Presenter	SAFE	SAFE	OUT			
Snow Robot (Snøroboten)	Fantorangen	Puppet	SAFE	OUT				
Cabin (Hytta)	Birgit Skarstein	Paralympic athlete	OUT					

The masked singer was safe from elimination.
The masked singer was eliminated from the competition and unmasked upon their elimination.

=== Episodes ===
==== Week 1 (15 October) ====
Performances on the first episode
#	Stage name	Song	Identity	Result
1	Zombie	"Somebody to Love" by Queen	undisclosed	SAFE
2	Snow Robot	"Can't Stop the Feeling!" by Justin Timberlake	undisclosed	SAFE
3	Dandy	"Minnie the Moocher" by Cab Calloway	undisclosed	SAFE
4	Freyja	"Castle" by Halsey	undisclosed	SAFE
5	Wolf	"Something Just Like This" by Coldplay & The Chainsmokers	undisclosed	SAFE
6	Rascal	"Fireball" by Pitbull	undisclosed	SAFE
7	Cabin	"Come Over" by Dagny	Birgit Skarstein	OUT
8	Hulder	"Queen of the Night" by Whitney Houston	undisclosed	SAFE

==== Week 2 (22 October) ====
Performances on the second episode
#	Stage name	Song	Identity	Result
1	Hulder	"Confident" by Demi Lovato	undisclosed	SAFE
2	Snow Robot	"I Sommer" by Josh Gad	Fantorangen	OUT
3	Dandy	"You Should See Me in a Crown" by Billie Eilish	undisclosed	SAFE
4	Wolf	"Dans På Bordet" by Ballinciaga & David Mokel	undisclosed	SAFE
5	Zombie	"Someone You Loved" by Lewis Capaldi	undisclosed	SAFE
6	Freyja	"Royals" by Lorde	undisclosed	SAFE
7	Rascal	"Freestyler" by Bomfunk MC's	undisclosed	SAFE

==== Week 3 (29 October) ====
Performances on the third episode
#	Stage name	Song	Identity	Result
1	Rascal	"Can't Hold Us" by Macklemore & Ryan Lewis	undisclosed	SAFE
2	Dandy	"Good as Hell" by Lizzo	undisclosed	SAFE
3	Wolf	"As It Was" by Harry Styles	undisclosed	SAFE
4	Hulder	"It's Oh So Quiet" by Betty Hutton	undisclosed	SAFE
5	Zombie	"Viva la Vida" by Coldplay	undisclosed	SAFE
6	Freyja	"Love Me like You Do" by Ellie Goulding	Ingrid Gjessing Linhave	OUT

==== Week 4 (5 November) ====
Performances on the fourth episode
#	Stage name	Song	Identity	Result
1	Zombie	"24K Magic" by Bruno Mars	undisclosed	SAFE
1	Zombie	"Life Is a Highway" by Rascal Flatts	undisclosed	SAFE
2	Hulder	"Wrecking Ball" by Miley Cyrus	undisclosed	SAFE
2	Hulder	"Over the Rainbow" by Judy Garland	undisclosed	SAFE
3	Wolf	"Bad Habits" by Ed Sheeran	undisclosed	SAFE
3	Wolf	"Blue (Da Ba Dee)" by Eiffel 65	undisclosed	SAFE
4	Dandy	"Oops!… I Did It Again" by Britney Spears	Maud Angelica Behn	OUT
4	Dandy	"Young and Beautiful" by Lana Del Rey	Maud Angelica Behn	OUT
5	Rascal	"Lonesome Traveler" by Paperboys	undisclosed	SAFE
5	Rascal	"Shake Ya Tailfeather" by Nelly, P. Diddy & Murphy Lee	undisclosed	SAFE

==== Week 5 (12 November) ====
- Guest panellist: Else Kåss Furuseth

Performances on the fifth episode
#	Stage name	Song	Identity	Result
1	Rascal	"Seven Nation Army" by The White Stripes	undisclosed	SAFE
2	Hulder	"Don't Go Yet" by Camila Cabello	Alexandra Joner	OUT
3	Wolf	"Hjerteknuser" by Kaizers Orchestra	undisclosed	SAFE
4	Zombie	"Somebody" by Dagny	undisclosed	SAFE
5	Hulder & Nicoline	"Shout Out to My Ex" by Little Mix		
6	Wolf & Gaute Ormåsen	"Stay" by The Kid Laroi & Justin Bieber		
7	Zombie & Didrik Solli-Tangen	"Lay Me Down" by Sam Smith		
8	Rascal & Alexandra Rotan	"Empire State of Mind" by Jay-Z & Alicia Keys		

==== Week 6 (19 November) - Finale ====
- Group performance: "All Night Long (All Night)" by Lionel Richie
- Guest panellist: Vegard Harm

Performances on the final episode
#	Stage name	Song	Identity	Result
Round One
1	Wolf	"The Final Countdown" by Europe	undisclosed	SAFE
2	Zombie	"Arcade" by Duncan Laurence	undisclosed	SAFE
3	Rascal	"Let Me Entertain You" by Robbie Williams	Øystein Pettersen	THIRD
Round Two
1	Wolf	"The Look" by Roxette	Daniel Kvammen	RUNNER-UP
2	Zombie	"I Want It That Way" by Backstreet Boys	Bilal Saab	WINNER

== Season 4 (2023) ==
=== Contestants ===
Stage name	Celebrity	Occupation	Episodes					
Stage name	Celebrity	Occupation	1	2	3	4	5	6
Cat (Kattepusen)	Kevin Vågenes	Comedian	SAFE	SAFE	SAFE	SAFE	SAFE	WINNER
Sparrowhawk (Spirrevippen)	Linnéa Myhre	Author	SAFE	SAFE	SAFE	SAFE	SAFE	RUNNER-UP
Ghost (Spøkelset)	Charlotte Frogner	Actress	SAFE	SAFE	SAFE	SAFE	SAFE	THIRD
Alien (Romvesenet)	Annika Momrak	YouTuber	SAFE	SAFE	SAFE	SAFE	OUT	
Turtle (Skilpadda)	Christopher Robin Omdahl	YouTuber	SAFE	SAFE	SAFE	OUT		
Cows (Kuene)	Katrine Moholt	TV personality	SAFE	SAFE	OUT			
Cows (Kuene)	Evelina Moholt	Actress	SAFE	SAFE	OUT			
Rat (Rotta)	Mads Hansen	Former football player	SAFE	OUT				
Magician (Magikeren)	Jørn Lier Horst	Author	OUT					

The masked singer was safe from elimination.
The masked singer was eliminated from the competition and unmasked upon their elimination.

=== Episodes ===
==== Week 1 (11 November) ====
Performances on the first episode
#	Stage name	Song	Identity	Result
1	Turtle	"Cake by the Ocean" by DNCE	undisclosed	SAFE
2	Sparrowhawk	"Wuthering Heights" by Kate Bush	undisclosed	SAFE
3	Rat	"Sweet Caroline" by DJ Ötzi	undisclosed	SAFE
4	Cat	"Personal Jesus" by Depeche Mode	undisclosed	SAFE
5	Cows	"Milkshake" by Kelis/"Moves Like Jagger" by Maroon 5/"Dance the Night" by Dua Lipa	undisclosed	SAFE
6	Alien	"SOS" by Rihanna	undisclosed	SAFE
7	Magician	"Abracadabra" by Steve Miller Band	Jørn Lier Horst	OUT
8	Ghost	"Into the Unknown" by Idina Menzel & Aurora	undisclosed	SAFE

==== Week 2 (18 November) ====
Performances on the second episode
#	Stage name	Song	Identity	Result
1	Cows	"Milkshake" by KuToppen feat. Lisa Børud/"Shake It Off" by Taylor Swift	undisclosed	SAFE
2	Ghost	"Halo" by Beyoncé	undisclosed	SAFE
3	Rat	"Rosa Helikopter" by Peaches	Mads Hansen	OUT
4	Alien	"I Love It" by Icona Pop feat. Charli XCX	undisclosed	SAFE
5	Sparrowhawk	"Take On Me" by A-ha	undisclosed	SAFE
6	Cat	"Creep" by Radiohead	undisclosed	SAFE
7	Turtle	"Badebussen" by DJ MøMø feat. Kjartan Lauritzen	undisclosed	SAFE

==== Week 3 (25 November) ====
Performances on the third episode
#	Stage name	Song	Identity	Result
1	Sparrowhawk	"Yeah!" by Usher feat. Lil Jon & Ludacris	undisclosed	SAFE
2	Ghost	"All by Myself" by Celine Dion	undisclosed	SAFE
3	Cat	"Latch" by Disclosure feat. Sam Smith	undisclosed	SAFE
4	Turtle	"Think About Things" by Daði and Gagnamagnið	undisclosed	SAFE
5	Alien	"Dynamite" by Sigrid	undisclosed	SAFE
6	Cows	"Cotton-Eyed Joe" by Amber Hayes	Katrine Moholt & Evelina Moholt	OUT

==== Week 4 (2 December) ====
Performances on the fourth episode
#	Stage name	Song	Identity	Result
1	Cat	"Can't Feel My Face" by The Weeknd	undisclosed	SAFE
1	Cat	"This Is Me" by Keala Settle & The Greatest Showman Ensemble	undisclosed	SAFE
2	Sparrowhawk	"Vampire" by Olivia Rodrigo	undisclosed	SAFE
2	Sparrowhawk	"Jump" by The Pointer Sisters	undisclosed	SAFE
3	Turtle	"I Don't Feel Like Dancin'" by Scissor Sisters/"Jungle Boogie" by Kool & the Gang	Christopher Robin Omdahl	OUT
3	Turtle	"Pokemon-Sangen" from Pokemon	Christopher Robin Omdahl	OUT
4	Alien	"Rett opp og ned" by Lars Vaular	undisclosed	SAFE
4	Alien	"Holding Out for a Hero" by Bonnie Tyler	undisclosed	SAFE
5	Ghost	"Back in Black" by AC/DC	undisclosed	SAFE
5	Ghost	"GoldenEye" by Tina Turner	undisclosed	SAFE

==== Week 5 (9 December) ====
Performances on the fifth episode
#	Stage name	Song	Identity	Result
1	Sparrowhawk	"The Logical Song" by Supertramp/Scooter	undisclosed	SAFE
2	Cat	"The Joke" by Brandi Carlile	undisclosed	SAFE
3	Alien	"Iris" by The Goo Goo Dolls	Annika Momrak	OUT
4	Ghost	"Monument" by Robyn & Röyksopp	undisclosed	SAFE
5	Alien & Mari Bølla	"Only Girl (In the World)" by Rihanna		
6	Cat & Ylva Olaisen	"Toxic" by Britney Spears		
7	Sparrowhawk & Aleksander With	"I Love You Always Forever" by Donna Lewis		
8	Ghost & Alessandra Mele	"Bang Bang" by Jessie J, Ariana Grande & Nicki Minaj		

==== Week 6 (16 December) - Finale ====
- Group performance: "Don't You Worry 'bout a Thing" by Stevie Wonder

Performances on the final episode
#	Stage name	Song	Identity	Result
Round One
1	Sparrowhawk	"Lose Yourself" by Eminem	undisclosed	SAFE
2	Cat	"The Power of Love" by Celine Dion	undisclosed	SAFE
3	Ghost	"Golden Ticket" by Highasakite	Charlotte Frogner	THIRD
Round Two
1	Sparrowhawk	"Nothing Compares 2 U" by Sinéad O'Connor	Linnéa Myhre	RUNNER-UP
2	Cat	"Kiss" by Prince	Kevin Vågenes	WINNER

== Season 5 (2024) ==
=== Contestants ===
Stage name	Celebrity	Occupation	Episodes					
Stage name	Celebrity	Occupation	1	2	3	4	5	6
Stone (Stein)	Kim Wigaard	Singer	SAFE	SAFE	SAFE	SAFE	SAFE	WINNER
Musk Ox (Moskusen)	Danby Choi	Journalist	SAFE	SAFE	SAFE	KEPT (Note: The panel used the "Gongonen" to save Moskus from elimination, allowing the portrayer to keep their mask on and continue in the competition.)	SAFE	RUNNER-UP
Happy Fish (Gladfisken)	Tone Damli	Singer	SAFE	SAFE	SAFE	SAFE	SAFE	THIRD
Vampire (Vampyren)	Emilie "Voe" Nereng	Blogger	SAFE	SAFE	SAFE	SAFE	OUT	
Food Monster (Matmonsteret)	Live Nelvik	TV Presenter	SAFE	SAFE	OUT			
Professor (Professoren)	Kristian Ødegård	TV Presenter	SAFE	OUT				
Mummy (Mumien)	Abubakar Hussein	Actor	OUT					

=== Episodes ===
==== Week 1 (9 November) ====
Performances on the first episode
#	Stage name	Song	Identity	Result
1	Stone	"I'm Still Standing" by Elton John	undisclosed	SAFE
2	Mummy	"Circle Of Life" by Elton John	Abubakar Hussein	OUT
3	Musk Ox	"Like I Love You" by Justin Timberlake	undisclosed	SAFE
4	Happy Fish	"Feeling Good" by Michael Buble	undisclosed	SAFE
5	Food Monster	"Hæljetur" by DJ MøMø	undisclosed	SAFE
6	Vampire	"Murder on the Dancefloor" by Sophie Ellis-Bextor	undisclosed	SAFE
7	Professor	"Cha Cha Cha" by Käärijä	undisclosed	SAFE

==== Week 2 (16 November) ====
Performances on the second episode
#	Stage name	Song	Identity	Result
1	Professor	"Larger than Life" by Backstreet Boys	Kristian Ødegard	OUT
2	Food Monster	"Please Please Please" by Sabrina Carpenter	undisclosed	SAFE
3	Vampire	"Dragostea Din Tei" by O-Zone	undisclosed	SAFE
4	Stone	"Take Me to Church" by Hozier	undisclosed	SAFE
5	Musk Ox	"Elektrisk" by Marcus & Martinus	undisclosed	SAFE
6	Happy Fish	"Diamonds" by Rihanna	undisclosed	SAFE

==== Week 3 (23 November) ====
Performances on the third episode
#	Stage name	Song	Identity	Result
1	Vampire	"Ella, elle l'a" by Kate Ryan	undisclosed	SAFE
1	Vampire	"Run to You" by Whitney Houston	undisclosed	SAFE
2	Happy Fish	"Italia" by Undergruun	undisclosed	SAFE
2	Happy Fish	"Like a Prayer" by Madonna	undisclosed	SAFE
3	Musk Ox	"Toxic" by Britney Spears	undisclosed	SAFE
3	Musk Ox	"Stay" by The Kid Laroi & Justin Bieber	undisclosed	SAFE
4	Stone	"Stonehenge" by Ylvis	undisclosed	SAFE
4	Stone	"I Want to Know What Love Is" by Foreigner	undisclosed	SAFE
5	Food Monster	"Mon amour" by Slimane	Live Nelvik	OUT
5	Food Monster	"Hjalmar" by Trond-Viggo Torgersen	Live Nelvik	OUT

==== Week 4 (30 November) ====
Performances on the fourth episode
#	Stage name	Song	Identity	Result
1	Stone	"...Baby One More Time" by Britney Spears	undisclosed	SAFE
1	Stone	"You Will Be Found" from Dear Evan Hansen	undisclosed	SAFE
2	Vampire	"Bli hos meg" by Dina	undisclosed	SAFE
2	Vampire	"Färger I En Vind" from Pocahontas	undisclosed	SAFE
3	Happy Fish	"Butterflies" by Tone Damli	undisclosed	SAFE
3	Happy Fish	"How Far I'll Go" from Moana	undisclosed	SAFE
4	Musk Ox	"The Fox (What Does the Fox Say?)" by Ylvis	undisclosed	KEPT
4	Musk Ox	"Born This Way" by Lady Gaga	undisclosed	KEPT

==== Week 5 (7 December) ====
Performances on the fifth episode
#	Stage name	Song	Identity	Result
1	Happy Fish	"Crazy in Love" by Beyoncé feat. Jay-Z	undisclosed	SAFE
2	Stone	"Wicked Game" by Chris Isaak	undisclosed	SAFE
3	Musk Ox	"Fairytale" by Alexander Rybak	undisclosed	SAFE
4	Vampire	"Lady Marmalade" by Christina Aguilera	Emilie "Voe" Nereng	OUT
5	Stone & Ina Svenningdal	"Når Snøen Smelter" by Astrid S		
6	Happy Fish & Margaret Berger	"Händerna mot himlen" by Petra Marklund		
7	Vampire & Ole Børud	"Drivers License" by Olivia Rodrigo		
8	Musk Ox & Markus Bailey	"Beggin" by Madcon		

==== Week 6 (14 December) - Finale ====
- Group performance: "Edge of Seventeen" by Stevie Nicks/"Midnight Sky" by Miley Cyrus

Performances on the final episode
#	Stage name	Song	Identity	Result
Round One
1	Happy Fish	"Remember" by Becky Hill	Tone Damli	THIRD
2	Stone	"My Way" by Frank Sinatra	undisclosed	SAFE
3	Musk Ox	"Gangnam Style" by PSY	undisclosed	SAFE
Round Two
1	Musk Ox	"U Can’t Touch This" by MC Hammer	Danby Choi	RUNNER-UP
2	Stone	"Man in the Mirror" by Michael Jackson	Kim Wigaard	WINNER

== Season 6 (2025) ==
=== Contestants ===
Stage name	Celebrity	Occupation	Episodes					
Stage name	Celebrity	Occupation	1	2	3	4	5	6
Broccoli (Brokkolien)	PelleK	Singer/Actor	SAFE	SAFE	SAFE	SAFE	SAFE	WINNER
Puppy (Hundevalpen)	Christine Dancke	Rapper	SAFE	SAFE	SAFE	SAFE	SAFE	RUNNER-UP
Puppet (Marionetten)	Emma Gunnarsen	Singer	SAFE	SAFE	SAFE	RISK	OUT	
Junkyard (Skrotnissen)	Vidar Magnussen	Actor/Comedian	RISK	KEPT (Note: The panel used the "Gongonen" to save Skrotnissen from elimination, allowing the portrayer to keep their mask on and continue in the competition.)	RISK	OUT		
Bath Duck (Badeanda)	John Hammersmark	Business Leader	RISK	RISK	OUT			
Orc (Orken)	Sophie Elise Isachen	Singer	SAFE	SAFE	WD (Note: Left voluntarily due to the Bronchitis.)			
Dorm Rabbit (Hybelkaninen)	Lubna Jaffery	Politician	OUT					

=== Episodes ===
==== Week 1 (8 November) ====
Performances on the first episode
#	Stage name	Song	Identity	Result
1	Junkyard	"Ballroom Blitz" by Sweet	undisclosed	RISK
2	Puppy	"Without You" by Avicii	undisclosed	SAFE
3	Bath Duck	"Wellerman" by Nathen Evans	undisclosed	RISK
4	Orc	"Gimme! Gimme! Gimme! (A Man After Midnight)" by ABBA	undisclosed	SAFE
5	Dorm Rabbit	"I Want to Break Free" by Queen	Lubna Jaffery	OUT
6	Broccoli	"Eternity" by Alex Warren	undisclosed	SAFE
7	Puppet	"Sax" by Fleur East	undisclosed	SAFE

==== Week 2 (15 November) ====
Performances on the second episode
#	Stage name	Song	Identity	Result
1	Broccoli	"The One and Only" by Chesney Hawkes	undisclosed	SAFE
2	Orc	"Beautiful" by Christina Aguilera	undisclosed	SAFE
3	Bath Duck	"Uprising" by Muse	undisclosed	RISK
4	Puppet	"What's in It for Me" by Amy Diamond	undisclosed	SAFE
5	Junkyard	"Starships" by Nicki Minaj	undisclosed	KEPT
6	Puppy	"Hometown Glory" by Adele	undisclosed	SAFE

==== Week 3 (22 November) ====
Performances on the third episode
#	Stage name	Song	Identity	Result
1	Puppy	"Forgive Me Friend" by Smith & Thell	undisclosed	SAFE
2	Broccoli	"You'll Be In My Heart" by Phil Collins	undisclosed	SAFE
3	Bath Duck	"Livet er for Kjipt" by Lars Kilevold	John Hammersmark	OUT
4	Puppet	"Stay" by Rihanna	undisclosed	SAFE
5	Junkyard	"Pretty Fly (For A White Guy)" by The Offspring	undisclosed	RISK

==== Week 4 (29 November) ====
Performances on the fourth episode
#	Stage name	Song	Identity	Result
1	Junkyard & Puppet	"Faith" by Stevie Wonder & Ariana Grande		
2	Puppy & Broccoli	"Arcade" by Duncan Lawrence		
3	Junkyard	"Grace Kelly" by Mika	Vidar Magnussen	OUT
4	Puppet	"Gunerius" by Karpe	undisclosed	RISK
5	Puppy	"Sympathy Is a Knife" by Charli XCX	undisclosed	SAFE
6	Broccoli	"Gaston" by Jesse Corti & Richard White	undisclosed	SAFE

==== Week 5 (6 December) ====
Performances on the fifth episode
#	Stage name	Song	Identity	Result
1	Broccoli	"Hearts On Fire" by John Cafferty	undisclosed	SAFE
2	Puppy	"Olé" by Adelén	undisclosed	SAFE
3	Puppet	"Superstar" by Jamelia	Emma Gunnarsen	OUT
4	Puppy & Lars Vaular	"Rett Opp og Ned" by Lars Vaular		
5	Broccoli & Nora Jabri	"Golden from KPop Demon Hunters		
6	Puppet & Marcus & Martinus	"Unforgettable" by Marcus & Martinus		

==== Week 6 (13 December) - Finale ====
- Group performance: "Give Me Everything" by Pitbull feat. Ne-Yo, Afrojack and Nayer

Performances on the final episode
#	Stage name	Song	Identity	Result
1	Broccoli	"I See Fire" by Ed Sheeran	PelleK	WINNER
1	Broccoli	"Främling" by Carola (duet with Puppy)	PelleK	WINNER
1	Broccoli	"Beautiful Things" by Benson Boone/"Rubia" by Zhou Shen/"Paw Patrol" from Paw Patrol	PelleK	WINNER
2	Puppy	"A Sky Full of Stars" by Coldplay	Christine Dancke	RUNNER-UP
2	Puppy	"Främling" by Carola (duet with Broccoli)	Christine Dancke	RUNNER-UP
2	Puppy	"Falle og slå seg" by Ari Bajgora/"Vis Deg Frem" by Christine Hals & Lisa Stokke/"Tattoo" by Loreen	Christine Dancke	RUNNER-UP

== Season 7 (2026) ==
=== Contestants ===
Stage name	Celebrity	Occupation	Episodes				
Stage name	Celebrity	Occupation	1	2	3	4	5
Bumblebee (Humla)	TBA		SAFE		SAFE	SAFE	SAFE
Pirate (Piraten)	TBA		SAFE		SAFE	SAFE	SAFE
Squirrel (Ekornet)	TBA			SAFE	SAFE	SAFE	RISK
Hedgehog (Pinnsvinet)	Lars Vaular	Rapper		SAFE	RISK	RISK	OUT
Mr. Poop (Herr Bæsj)	Marlene Stavrum	TV Personality		SAFE	SAFE	OUT	
National Lion (Riksløven)	Mushaga Bakenga	Footballer	SAFE		OUT		
Volcano (Vulkanen)	Harald Rønneberg	TV Personality		OUT			
Penguin (Pingvinen)	Maren Teien Rørvik	TV Host	OUT				

=== Episodes ===
==== Week 1 (24 October) ====
Performances on the first episode
#	Stage name	Song	Identity	Result
1	Pirate	"What's Up?" by People R Ugly	undisclosed	SAFE
2	National Lion	"Shotgun" by George Ezra	undisclosed	SAFE
3	Penguin	"Fever Dream" by Alex Warren	Maren Teien Rørvik	OUT
4	Bumblebee	"Shake It Off" by Taylor Swift	undisclosed	SAFE
5	National Lion & Penguin	"Hips Don't Lie" by Shakira feat. Wyclef Jean		
6	Pirate & Bumblebee	"There's Nothing Holdin' Me Back" by Shawn Mendes		

==== Week 2 (31 October) ====
Performances on the second episode
#	Stage name	Song	Identity	Result
1	Squirrel	"Pretty Ugly" by Zara Larsson	undisclosed	SAFE
2	Hedgehog	"Blinding Lights" by The Weeknd	undisclosed	SAFE
3	Volcano	"Firework" by Katy Perry	Harald Rønneberg	OUT
4	Mr. Poop	"Fabulous" by MEEK	undisclosed	SAFE
5	Hedgehog & Volcano	"Big Girl (You Are Beautiful)" by Mika		
6	Squirrel & Mr. Poop	"Bangaranga" by DARA		

==== Week 3 (7 November) ====
Performances on the third episode
#	Stage name	Song	Identity	Result
1	Pirate	"Runaway Baby" by Bruno Mars	undisclosed	SAFE
2	National Lion	"Stand by Me" by Ben E. King	Mushaga Bakenga	OUT
3	Mr. Poop	"Abracadabra" by Lady Gaga	undisclosed	SAFE
4	Hedgehog	"Old Town Road" by Lil Nas X and Billy Ray Cyrus	undisclosed	RISK
5	Squirrel	"Bad Guy" by Billie Eilish	undisclosed	SAFE
6	Bumblebee	"Runaway" by Aurora	undisclosed	SAFE

==== Week 4 (14 November) ====
- Group performance: "Let's Go Crazy" by Prince and The Revolution

Performances on the fourth episode
#	Stage name	Song	Identity	Result
1	Bumblebee	"Symphony" by Clean Bandit feat. Zara Larsson	undisclosed	SAFE
2	Squirrel	"Manchild" by Sabrina Carpenter	undisclosed	SAFE
3	Hedgehog	"Never Gonna Give You Up" by Rick Astley	undisclosed	RISK
4	Mr. Poop	"Creep" by Radiohead	Marlene Stavrum	OUT
5	Pirate	"You Can't Stop This" by Alex Warren	undisclosed	SAFE

==== Week 5 (21 November) ====
Performances on the fifth episode
#	Stage name	Song	Identity	Result
1	Bumblebee	"Händerna mot himlen" by Petra Marklund	undisclosed	SAFE
2	Hedgehog	"Feel Good Inc." by Gorillaz	Lars Vaular	OUT
3	Pirate	"Glorious" by Andreas Johnson	undisclosed	SAFE
4	Squirrel	"Look Who's Laughing Now" by Benjamin Ingrosso	undisclosed	RISK
5	Bumblebee & Kim Wigaard	"Unethical" by Faouzia		
6	Hedgehog & May	"Galopp" by Stig Brenner, Coucheron, May & Arif		
7	Squirrel & Jonas Lovv	"Ya Ya Ya" by Jonas Lovv		
8	Pirate & Staysman	"Bøgda" by Hagle & Staysman		
