= Don't Be Shallow =

EP by Sondre Lerche
- Released: 23 September 2003
- Recorded: 2000 – 2003
- Genre: Indie pop
- Length: 32:39
- Label: Astralwerks
- Producer: Sondre Lerche, H.P. Gundersen, Jorgen Træen

Sondre Lerche chronology
Sleep on Needles (2002)	Don't Be Shallow (2003)	Two Way Monologue (2004)

Professional ratings
Review scores
Source	Rating
Allmusic	3/5 stars

Don't Be Shallow is an EP by Sondre Lerche, released as a limited edition on 23 September 2003. It comprises two songs left over from the 2000 album Faces Down (tracks 1 and 3), and two home recordings produced in 2001 (tracks 2 and 4), followed by four exclusive live bonus tracks from Lerche's winter/spring 2003 U.S. solo tours. The EP is also available very limitedly in Europe.

== Track listing ==
No.	Title	Length
1.	"Don't Be Shallow" (B side)	4:07
2.	"Living Lounge" (Home recording)	5:20
3.	"I Know, I Know" (B side)	3:02
4.	"Single-Hand Affairs" (Home recording)	3:29
5.	"Dead Passengers" (Live)	4:05
6.	"You Know So Well" (Live)	4:32
7.	"Sleep On Needles" (Live)	4:39
8.	"Night and Day" (Live)	3:25
