= Phantom Punch =

Phantom Punch may refer to:

- The punch that ended Muhammad Ali vs. Sonny Liston II
- Neil Lefner's iconic sports photograph of Ali taunting the stricken Liston to "get up and fight"
- Phantom Punch (film), a 2008 Sonny Liston biopic starring Ving Rhames
- Phantom Punch (album), the fourth album by Sondre Lerche
