= Please (Sondre Lerche album) =

2014 studio album by Sondre Lerche

Studio album by Sondre Lerche
- Released: 23 September 2014
- Studios: Ocean Sound Recordings (Bergen); Studio 5071 (Bergen); Skogen Studio (Bergen); Rare Book Room (Brooklyn); Room 17 (Brooklyn)
- Genre: Indie pop
- Length: 41:46
- Labels: Mona; Yep Roc
- Producers: Kato Ådland; Sondre Lerche; Matias Tellez

Sondre Lerche chronology
Bootlegs (2012)	Please (2014)	Pleasure (2017)

Singles from Please
- 1. "Bad Law" Released: 21 May 2014; 2. "Sentimentalist" Released: 5 September 2014

Please is the seventh studio album by Norwegian singer-songwriter Sondre Lerche, released on 23 September 2014 on Mona Records and distributed by Yep Roc Records. It was produced by Lerche, Kato Ådland and Matias Tellez. An indie pop record, Please was widely described as Lerche's "divorce album"; (Note: Attributed to multiple sources:) it features instances of lyrical dissonance and marks more experimentation in Lerche's musicality and songwriting process, opting for a more raw and rhythmic style.

The album received generally positive reviews, with particular praise given to Lerche's songwriting and earnestness. The release of Please was supported by several music videos, as well as a major tour in the fall of 2014, which included some international debut performances for Lerche. Please marked the first in what Lerche later described as a "trilogy" of albums, followed by Pleasure in 2017 and Patience in 2020.

== Background ==
Prior to the release of Please, Lerche had developed a reputation for a "jazzy brand of indie pop", according to PopMatters, with a wide range of influences and styles, including bossa nova chord progressions and eccentric lyricism. He began writing songs that would eventually appear on Please in early 2012. In the summer of 2013, Lerche and Mona Fastvold, to whom he had been married since 2005, divorced in what Lerche called a fast-moving "disintegration" of their marriage. Although he had already written and made early recordings of some songs on Please prior to the divorce, Lerche said many of his lyrics were then recontextualized as foreshadowing problems in his personal life. Lerche took the opportunity to record Please in the studio as a way to process these events, and it became what he called "such an important part of my dealing with everything".

== Recording ==
According to Lerche, recording sessions for Please were somewhat evenly split between taking place in Bergen, his hometown, and Brooklyn, which was a process Lerche said "represents both where I come from and where I am". Norwegian studios used to record Please included Studio 5071, Ocean Sound Recordings, and Matias Tellez's Skogen Studio, while Rare Book Room and Room 17 were used for the Brooklyn sessions. Tellez, Kato Ådland, and Lerche himself all were credited as producers on the album.

Lerche recorded 17 songs during the sessions for Please, but some felt thematically inappropriate for the final album, something Lerche described as a feeling that these songs "belonged to the future"; though they were cut from Please, they eventually made their way onto his following album, Pleasure, in 2017.

== Music and lyrics ==
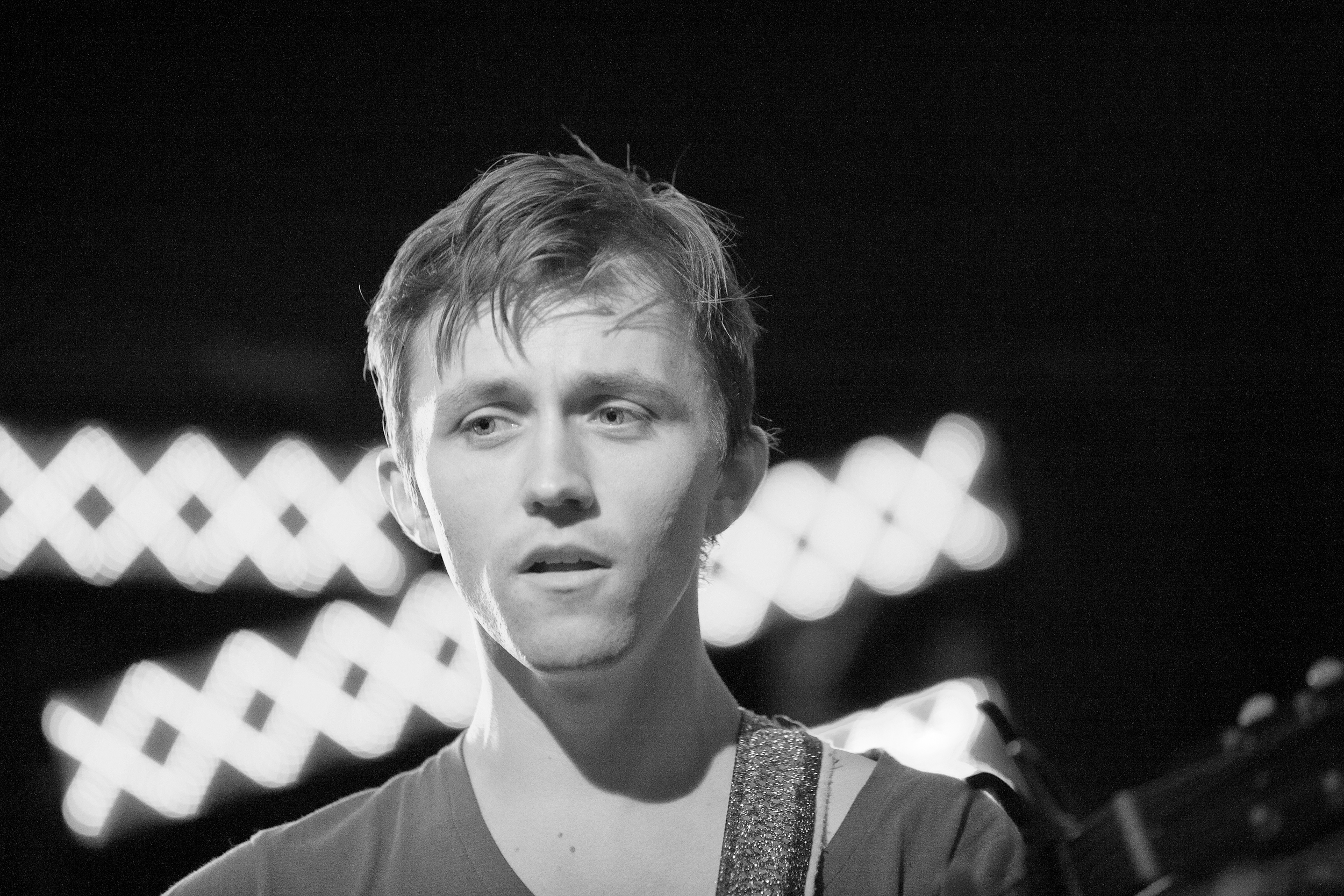
Lerche, pictured in 2012, published a press release promoting Please as the first time he was "presented unraveled" in his career.

Please is an indie pop album, but in contrast to Lerche's more "breezy" previous albums, Alex Bieler of the Erie Reader found that Please provided additional "bite" to Lerche's body of work. Aftenposten described Please as Lerche "taking more risks", giving the album a more raw and experimental sound while still possessing Lerche's pre-existing jazz and pop influences. Please contains "noisy overtones" and additional electronic effects, with songs like "At Times We Live Alone" (the longest on the album) driven by heavy guitar and electric organ instrumentation, in which Aftenposten saw inspiration from The Strokes and Arctic Monkeys. Lerche called the album "more raw and darkly cathartic" than any of his previous works.

Writing for Consequence of Sound, Sasha Geffen described a metatextual irony in the song "Sentimentalist", which contains the line "I'm no sentimentalist", despite Lerche's career containing "charmingly polite love songs" rife with sentimentality; however, Geffen speculated Lerche was "in on the joke" as the song itself is called "Sentimentalist" with "no negative modifier to be found". Geffen characterized the song's blend of "1940s string ensembles and guitar-driven shoegaze" as another example of Lerche's adventurism on Please. Brice Ezell of PopMatters described "Sentimentalist" as containing the contradiction of being "a romanticist, but not a sentimentalist", which then opens "the questions that anyone is bound to ask after the dissolution of a long-term relationship". Lerche's work on Please was compared by The Brooklyn Rail to Dan Bejar, for the similarities of the album's lyricism to Bob Dylan and Dadaism.

"Bad Law", the album's lead single, was written to capture the paranoid feeling of having done something wrong without knowing exactly what it was, inspired by Lerche's experiences at United States customs control when entering the country. However, Ezell also interpreted the song as encompassing a major theme of Please: "that people can hurt others, intentionally or unintentionally, and nonetheless remain good". In an interview with Lerche, Helen Tseng of Mission Mission pointed out the contrast between the danceability of "Bad Law" with its dark lyrics; this dissonance was echoed by Ezell, who additionally applied it to the instrumentation of "Bad Law", noting the moments "when the song's snappy, catchy guitar chords give way to a distorted, chaotic prechorus riff".

Halfway through (the process of making the record), I thought I knew what the album was about. Then, during a really turbulent summer, my life changed completely and, naturally, the album changed with it. Good songs are always hard to write, even the easy ones. They all come out of this invisible herd of hundreds of songs and ideas that I would never want anyone to hear.

— Sondre Lerche

Although Please was widely described as Lerche's "divorce album", Lerche himself acknowledged that Please did not sound like "your sort of typical divorce record", which was a subversion of expectations that John Norris of Refinery29 summarized to Lerche as "you're not mad, and you're not down". Linda Laban of The New York Observer said that Please was "no mournful tome of heartache and bitterness", while Ryan Parker of Pop Theology wrote that although Please contained sad themes surrounding the end of a relationship, "there's a manic joy to the whole affair where one might expect sober reflection". Stephen Thompson of NPR summarized the contrast between Please's energetic musicality and its lyrical themes examining the darker side of love as "the work of a guy who understands that tearing down doesn't do much good if you don't bother building something better".

Please also contains songs with supernatural themes, including "Lucifer" and "After the Exorcism"; PopMatters analyzed these two songs together as representing a desire to be rid of "malevolent inner spirits". "Logging Off", the album's closing track, uses metaphors of a ghost and a mirror in its lyrics, which Ezell interpreted as vehicles to reflect on a breakup.

Retrospectively, Lerche said that Please was the first time in his career he felt that he had succeeded at approaching songwriting in a different direction than in his previous works. Lerche said he was "more conscious and specific" with the narrative of Please and subsequent albums, as he wrote songs that were initially loose and unconnected without one session for an album in mind, then selectively fit these songs together to "connect in the bigger picture". While in most cases Lerche had previously started his songwriting process with chords or melodies, the songs on Please used their rhythms as the starting point instead, which Lerche believed led to the album being "more stylistically and rhythmically concise".

== Promotion and release ==
Please was first announced in May 2014, supported by the release of the album's first single, "Bad Law". "Bad Law" was later accompanied by a music video released that June, directed by Evan Savitt; Lerche also revealed the video's events were inspired by a real-life incident in which he had accidentally ruined a party in an uncharacteristically drunken state, capturing the feeling of no longer being the "life of the party". Additionally, Lerche published 21 stems from "Bad Law" for free, and challenged fans to remix the song as part of a competition.

The second single from Please, "Sentimentalist", was released on September 5, 2014. He later released additional music videos promoting Please, including "Legends" on 15 September 2014, "Sentimentalist" on 13 November 2014, and "Lucky Guy" on 19 February 2015.

Please was released worldwide on 23 September 2014; it was published on Lerche's self-operated Mona Records label imprint and was distributed by Yep Roc Records. Prior to its official rollout, Please was made available for streaming in full via a "first listen" preview on NPR's website on 14 September 2014.

After the album's release, Lerche began a touring schedule to promote Please, beginning in North America from September to October 2014, before shifting to Europe later that October and November. Lerche also debuted his first ever shows in Australia and South Korea in late November 2014. In January 2015, Lerche performed "Bad Law" from Please as the closing act of the Spellemannprisen award ceremony in Stavanger, which the Oslo-based newspaper Dagsavisen called "an exceptionally outrageous performance". That August, Lerche told Aftenposten that, after some time spent touring and performing material from the album, he believed Please "belongs on a stage" due to the energetic nature of its songs, and remarked on its success at festivals.

== Critical reception ==
Professional ratings
Aggregate scores
Source	Rating
Metacritic	74/100
Review scores
Source	Rating
Bergensavisen	5/6 stars
Consequence of Sound	C+
Drowned in Sound	7/10
Exclaim!	7/10
MusicOMH	3.5/5 stars
NRK	4/6 stars
PopMatters	9/10
The Line of Best Fit	7/10

According to the review aggregator Metacritic, Please received "generally favorable reviews" based on a weighted average score of 74 out of 100 from 9 critic scores.

PopMatters author Brice Ezell lauded Please as a "pop masterpiece", commenting on its "dynamic and colorful" nature, and praising Lerche for taking more risks with the album's composition while maintaining his established musical identity. Ezell concluded that the album brought Lerche's already unique style to "a whole new level". Sam Cleeve of Drowned in Sound highlighted the production on Please, finding it sufficiently experimental without "demand[ing] the sacrifice of one iota of catchiness". Paul Pearson of Treble called Please "one of this year's most fulfilled and dynamic singer/songwriter releases".

Kellen McGugan of The Oklahoman positively reviewed Please by writing, "Most songwriters can lament love lost, but no one can do it quite like [Lerche]. Something about Lerche makes it personal. It is a rare gift we are lucky to share with him"; McGugan further commented on Lerche's "clever" lyrics and praised Lerche's honesty in his songwriting. Aftenposten, in Lerche's native Norwegian, also praised the earnestness of Please, calling it "genuine" and "alive" in a review by Eivind A. Westad Stuen. Bergensavisen, a newspaper in Lerche's hometown of Bergen, praised Lerche's growth since his debut with 2002's Faces Down, suggesting that additional life experiences and a bolder direction on Please had made Lerche into "one of Norway's best songwriters".

In a more critical review for The Chimes News of Biola University, Allison Winters opined that Please did not live up to its emotional stakes and speculated that it would be difficult for listeners going through similar breakups to connect with the album. Sasha Geffen of Consequence of Sound rated the album a "C+", saying, "Lerche's playful expressions of heartbreak capture those extremes with competent, if rote, poise, even if a few of his experiments fall flat".

== Track listing ==
All tracks are written by Sondre Lerche.

No.	Title	Length
1.	"Bad Law"	3:33
2.	"Crickets"	3:21
3.	"Legends"	3:04
4.	"At Times We Live Alone"	6:15
5.	"Sentimentalist"	4:08
6.	"Lucifer"	4:44
7.	"After the Exorcism"	3:39
8.	"At a Loss for Words"	4:20
9.	"Lucky Guy"	3:59
10.	"Logging Off"	4:43
Total length:		41:46

== Credits and personnel ==
Credits were adapted from the liner notes.

=== Musicians ===
- David Heilman – drums (1, 4–9), keyboards (6)
- Chris Holm – bass (4–6, 8–10), guitar (5)
- Alexander von Mehren – keyboards (5–6, 10)
- Kato Ådland – various instruments (1–4, 7)
- Matias Tellez – various instruments (5–6, 8–10)
- Tim Fain – strings (9)
- Steve Marion – additional guitar (8)
- Kim Åge Furuhaug – drums (10)
- Sondre Lerche – vocals, guitars (all tracks)

=== Production ===
- Kato Ådland – engineering, production (1–3, 7), mixing (1–4, 7), co-production (4)
- Matias Tellez – engineering, production (5–6, 10), mixing (8–10), additional engineering (8–9)
- Joe Rogers – engineering (9)
- Sondre Lerche – production (4, 8–9)
- Gabe Wax – engineering (4, 8)
- Anthony Molina – mixing (5–6)
- Tim Fain – string arrangements, engineering (9)
- Steve Marion – engineering (8)

== Charts ==
Chart performance for Please
Chart (2014)	Peak position
Norwegian Albums (VG-lista)	34
US Heatseekers Albums (Billboard)	32
