= Per Fredrik Åsly =

- Born: Per Fredrik Åsly; 21 December 1986 (age 39); Sandefjord, Vestfold, Norway
- Other name: PelleK
- Occupations: Singer; songwriter; actor; YouTuber
- Years active: 2010–present
- Partner(s): Stina Bakken (2015–present; engaged)
- Musical career
- Genres: Power metal; heavy metal; hard rock; glam metal
- Instruments: Vocals; guitar; keyboard; bass guitar; drums
- Website: pellekshop.com

YouTube information
- Channels: pellekofficial; pellekofficial2
- Subscribers: 3.87 million (pellekofficial); 54.0 thousand (pellekofficial2)
- Views: 725 million (pellekofficial); 1.12 million (pellekofficial2)
- Last updated: 19 June 2026

Per Fredrik Åsly, better known as PelleK (born Sandefjord, 21 December 1986) is a Norwegian singer, songwriter, actor, and YouTuber.

In April 2016, the British power metal band DragonForce, had embarked on the "Killer Elite World Tour" to support the release of a new double CD of the band's greatest hits. However, in July 2016 DragonForce issued a statement on the health status of their singer Marc Hudson, revealing he had been signed off by doctors and was unable to perform at the Metal Days Festival in Slovenia and the Benatska! Festival in the Czech Republic. PelleK was the stand in vocalist for these two shows.

In 2022, Åsly performed the opening song of the anime Skeleton Knight in Another World titled Ah, My Romantic Road.

== Discography ==
=== Albums ===
==== Original albums ====
Title	Album details
Bag of Tricks	Released: 30 May 2012; Label: Liljegren Records; Formats: CD, digital download
Ocean of Opportunity	Released: 10 May 2013; Label: Self-released; Formats: CD, digital download
Christmas with PelleK	Released: 15 November 2013; Label: Self-released; Formats: CD, digital download
Cloud Dancers	Released: 6 December 2014; Label: Self-released; Formats: CD, digital download
A Marvelous Method of Reclusion	Released: 1 June 2016; Label: Self-released; Formats: CD, digital download
Absolute Steel	Released: 8 July 2018; Label: Self-released; Formats: CD, digital download

==== With Damnation Angels ====
Title	Album details
Bringer of Light	Released: 7 March 2012 (Japan); Label: Radtone Music; Formats: CD
The Valiant Fire	Released: 27 March 2015; Label: Massacre Records; Formats: CD

==== With Timo Tolkki's Avalon ====
- Timo Tolkki's Avalon: The Enigma Birth - 2021

== Filmography ==
=== Film ===
As actor
Year	Title	Role	Director	Notes
2020	Creators: The Past	Alex Huntsman	Piergiuseppe Zaia	
TBA	Infisert (Infected)	Alec Krohn	Robert Rønning	

=== Television ===
As actor
Year	Title	Role	Notes
2015	Skal vi danse?	Himself	10 Episodes
2019	Vikings	Envoy	3 Episodes
2025	Maskorama series 6	Brokkolien	6 Episodes, won 1st place
