= Polaroid Pool Party EP =

EP by Sondre Lerche
- Released: Summer 2008
- Genres: Pop, Rock
- Length: 28:38
- Label: Self-released

Sondre Lerche chronology
Daytrotter Session (207)	Polaroid Pool Party EP (2008)	Polaroid Pumpkin Party (2008)

Polaroid Pool Party is an EP from Norwegian artist Sondre Lerche. The EP was available only on CD-R during Sondre's West Coast 2008 summer tour. In lieu of traditional jewel cases and album art, it came in a plain cd sleeve with the CD-R and a Polaroid photo visible in the window. Most of the photos were from a pool party Sondre hosted in August 2008.

== Track listing ==
1. Weakest Spot – 6:23
2. To Hell – 3:29
3. It's Nothing – 5:16
4. Visions to Decline – 5:27
5. Heartbeat Radio (demo) – 4:07
6. Lullaby Recorded in a Room Where My Sister Was Sleeping – 3:56

== Credits ==
All songs written, performed, produced and recorded by Sondre Lerche in New York City and Bergen, except #1 mixed by Tommy Haltbakk in Bergen, #2 drums, screams, and mix by Kato Ådland. Mastered by Lawrence Manchester.
