= Robert Stoltenberg =

Norwegian actor and comedian (born 1965)

- Born: 17 April 1965 (age 60); Oslo, Norway
- Other names: Piirka Kellivoite
- Years active: 1990–present

Robert Stoltenberg (born 17 April 1965) is a Norwegian actor and comedian known for his various impressions in different comedy series. He had a great success and skyrocketed into stardom with the television series Borettslaget, being both the creator of the series and playing most of the main characters.

== Life and career ==
Stoltenberg grew up in Fetsund, and started in the radio-newspaper for youngsters at the age of 17. From there he became NRK P2's morning radio and in the middle of traffic. After that he took his degree in history at the University of Oslo and then left for Lillehammer to take education as a TV director. He has directed about sixty promotion movies for the Norwegian television company NRK. In 2011, Stoltenberg came out as gay on the TV talk show Skavlan.

He entered television screens in 1990. He was then host for the pop music show Panorama, together with his twin Harald Stoltenberg, on NRK. He has also appeared in a small role as a Polish bear hunter in the film Trollhunter. He had a significant voice role in the Norwegian-language versions of the Madagascar movies. In the Spring of 2013, and again the same time in 2014, he is one of seven members of the Underholdningsavdelingen comedy television show troupe (airing on the national Norwegian channel NRK1).

Stoltenberg joined the panel of Maskorama for its fourth season in 2023.

He is a distant relative of the former prime minister of Norway, Jens Stoltenberg, the surname following the male line down to them both.

== Awards ==
Stoltenberg's Borettslaget received several Gullruten awards in 2002. He won two Amanda awards in 2002 for Borettslaget (Best television drama and Best actor). In 2002 he was also awarded the Se og Hør readers' TV personality of the year award.

== Personal life ==
Stoltenberg is gay. He has been a relationship with Christian Grønvold for the past 30 years.

Awards
Preceded by Frithjof Wilborn	Se og Hør's TV Personality of the Year; 2002	Succeeded by Kristian Valen
