= Polaroid Pumpkin Party EP =

EP by Sondre Lerche
- Released: Fall 2008
- Genres: Pop, rock
- Label: Self-released

Sondre Lerche chronology
Polaroid Pool Party (2008)	Polaroid Pumpkin Party EP (2008)	Heartbeat Radio (2009)

Polaroid Pumpkin Party is an EP from Norwegian artist Sondre Lerche. The EP was available only on Sondre's East Coast tour in 2008, and featured a different track listing than the related Polaroid Pool Party EP earlier that year. In lieu of traditional jewel cases and album art, it came in a plain cd sleeve with the CD-R and a Polaroid photo visible in the window. The photos were from fall events such as Halloween 2008.

== Track listing ==
Five tracks the same as Polaroid Pool Party EP, the sixth different.

1. Weakest Spot – 6:24
2. To Hell – 3:32
3. It's Nothing – 5:16
4. Visions to Decline – 5:28
5. Lullaby Recorded in a Room Where My Sister Was Sleeping – 3:56
6. Like Lazenby (demo) – 3:20
