= Emma Gunnarsen =

Norwegian singer (born 2008)

- Born: Emma Gunnarsen; June 17, 2008 (age 18); Trofors, Grane Municipality, Norway
- Origin: Norway
- Occupation: Singer
- Instrument: Vocals
- Years active: 2016–present
- Label: Sony Music Norway

Emma Gunnarsen (born 17 June 2008), also known monomously as Emma or eMMa, is a Norwegian singer.

== Early life ==
Gunnarsen is from Trofors and is the younger sister of musical duo Marcus & Martinus. She had an interest in music from a young age.

== Career ==
At the age of eight, Gunnarsen released her debut single "Engler I Sne", which is a song about Christmas. In 2018, she released the track "Fått deg på hjerne". At age ten, she opened the Norway Cup. In 2020, Gunnarsen released her single "Million". The following year, she released her first English language track "This & That". In 2023 she released her single "Over Deg".

In 2025, Gunnarsen participated as "The Marionette" in the singing competition "Maskorama". In the same year, she signed with Sony Music Norway. She has a documentary produced about her adolescence. In 2026, Gunnarsen participated in that years edition of Melodi Grand Prix, the Norwegian selection for the Eurovision Song Contest with her entry "Northern Lights". Her brothers had previously represented Sweden at the 2024 contest in Malmö. In the final, she received a total of 99 points and placed third. Following Melodi Grand Prix 2026, she released her single "Diva".

She has performed at Norwegian venues and events including "Piknik i Parken", "VG-Lista Topp 40", "Sentrum Scene", "Kongsberg Jazz Festival" and at the "Parkteatret".

== Discography ==
=== Singles ===
- "Engler i sne" (2016)
- "Fått deg på hjernen" (2018)
- "Million" (2020)
- "This & That" (2021)
- "Over Deg" (2023)
- "Northern Lights" (2026)
- "Diva" (2026)

== Filmography ==
=== TV ===
• "Maskorama" - 2025 - contestant (The Marionette)

• "Melodi Grand Prix" - 2026 - contestant

=== Documentary ===
• "Emma" - 2025 - Documentary Series
