= Linnéa Myhre =

Norwegian author and blogger (born 1990)

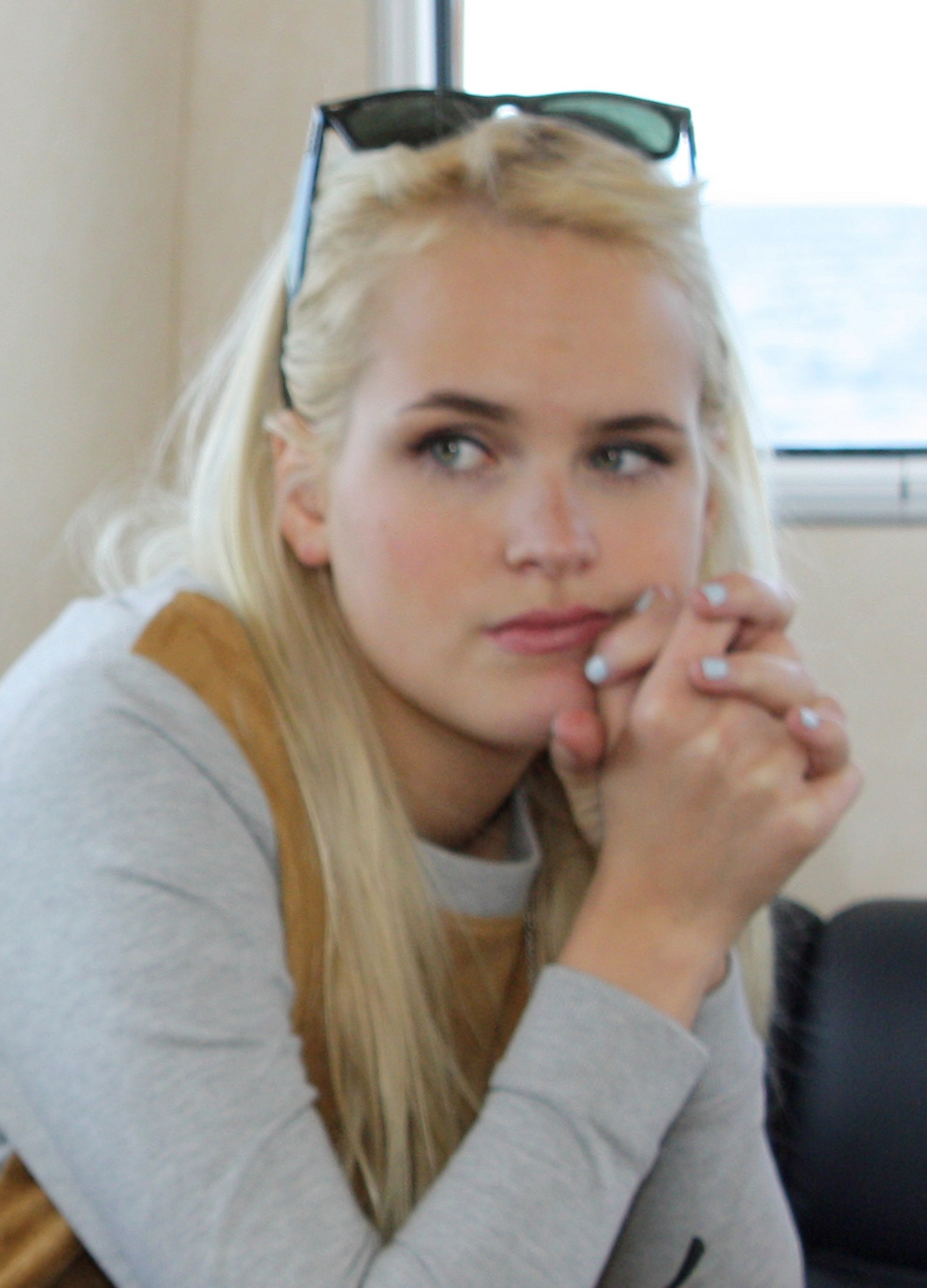
- Born: Linnéa Solli Myhre; 16 April 1990 (age 36); Molde, Norway
- Occupation: Writer
- Partner: Sondre Lerche (2013–2020)
- Awards: Tabuprisen

Linnéa Solli Myhre (born 16 April 1990) is a Norwegian author and blogger.

Her blog was among the country's most read with daily visits by over 30,000 unique readers. In 2011 she was named the best blogger of the year during the Vixen Blog Awards and Costume Awards.

== Early life ==
Myhre was born in Molde, the daughter of journalist Arild Myhre.

As part of the trio Mabelin, Myhre participated in the first edition of Melodi Grand Prix Junior in 2002, with the song "Det var en gang". The group came in tenth (last) place with ten points. "Det var en gang" was included in the Melodi Grand Prix Junior 2002 album, which charted on the VG-lista for ten weeks, reaching number four as the highest position.

== Career ==
On 29 November 2011, the website La Linnéa Leve was started by Linnéa Myhre and Andreas Øverland on the NRK network. The series is about mental disorders and how Myhre has depression despite prolonged psychological treatment.

Myhre released the novel Evig søndag in 2012. The book is defined as a novel, but is close to reality as it follows one year in Linnéa Myhre's life. During the year, she reluctantly began to go to psychiatrists for her depression, and Myhre's problems with eating disorder are central to the book. The first edition of 2,500 books were sold on launch day. For 2012, she received the Tabupris from the Council for Mental Health. Myhre's second novel Kjære was released in October 2014. Her third book Hver gang du forlater meg came in 2016.

In autumn 2014, Myhre was a participant in the entertainment programme Skal vi danse? on TV 2. Anne-Kat. Hærland referred to her as her own "heir" and she has been named Norway's sexiest woman by the magazine Mann.

== Bibliography ==
Year	Title
2012	Evig søndag
2014	Kjære
2016	Hver gang du forlater meg
