= Emilie Marie Nereng =

Internet celebrity

Emilie Voe Nereng
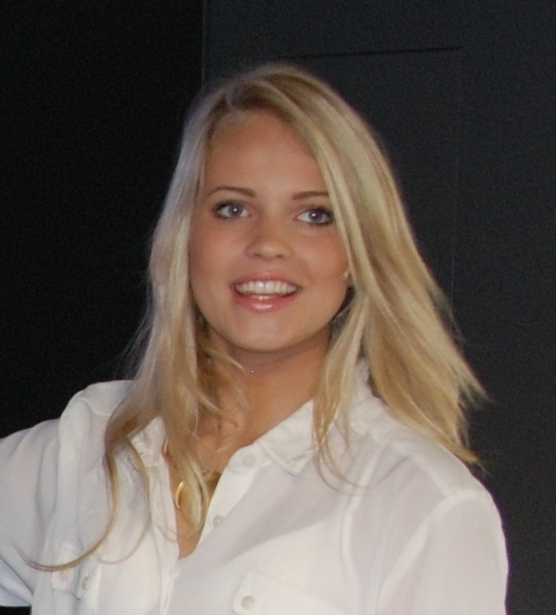
- Born: 3 November 1995 (age 30)
- Occupations: Blogger and musician
- Website: emilievoe.com

Emilie Marie Nereng, also known as "Voe" (born 3 November 1995) is a Norwegian blogger and musician from Hønefoss.

== Career ==
She began blogging in March 2009 and by 2010 was Norway's most read blog. In October 2009 alone she had 3.5 million hits.

In June 2010, she sang in front of 80,000 people at the Rådhusplassen in Oslo. She has also worked as a model and has appeared in the youth magazine "Top" and women's magazine "Julia". Nereng has lectured on social media for Lillehammer College. She was the youngest to ever lecture at the university. In January 2011 she announced that she would stop blogging because she was exhausted. However, in March 2015 she reopened her blog on a new domain, voeblogg.no

In April 2017 she stopped blogging indefinitely. She returned in 2019, after her successful stint on "Skal Vi Danse" (Norway's version of "Dancing with the Stars")

She has managed to gain some popularity in the English speaking world despite her blog being written in Norwegian.

She also released a single in 2010 titled: "Do Not Talk to Me"

In 2019, Emilie rose to 8th place on TC Candler's "100 Most Beautiful Faces of 2019". She has made the Top 100 four times.

In August 2020, Emilie changed her YouTube channel to a food based channel, focusing on healthy cooking and nutrition.
