= Heartbeat Radio =

Studio album by Sondre Lerche
- Released: September 8, 2009 (US)
- Genre: Pop, rock
- Length: 46:18
- Label: Rounder
- Producer: Kato Ådland

Sondre Lerche chronology
Polaroid Pumpkin Party (2008)	Heartbeat Radio (2009)	Sondre Lerche (2011)

Professional ratings
Aggregate scores
Source	Rating
Metacritic	67/100
Review scores
Source	Rating
AllMusic	4.5/5 stars
Associated Press	(positive)
Los Angeles Times	3.5/4 stars
New York Times	(very favorable)
Pitchfork	6.1/10
Spin	8/10
Slant	3/5 stars
The Washington Post	(neutral)

Heartbeat Radio is the fifth studio album by Norwegian singer-songwriter and guitarist Sondre Lerche. The album was released in the U.S. on September 8, 2009, and in Europe on September 14. The album was released on Rounder Records, and is distributed digitally, on CD and on vinyl LP.

The first single and title track, "Heartbeat Radio", was sent to rock radio in July 2009.

== Track listing ==
All songs written by Sondre Lerche.

1. "Good Luck" – 5:13
2. "Heartbeat Radio" – 4:04
3. "I Cannot Let You Go" – 4:45
4. "Like Lazenby" – 3:23
5. "If Only" – 3:54
6. "Pioneer" – 2:08
7. "Easy to Persuade" – 3:43
8. "Words & Music" – 3:29
9. "I Guess It's Gonna Rain Today" – 4:03
10. "Almighty Moon" – 4:33
11. "Don't Look Now" – 3:12
12. "Goodnight" – 3:51
