= Duper Sessions =

Studio album by Sondre Lerche
- Released: 27 February 2006
- Recorded: 2005
- Genres: Jazz, indie pop
- Length: 41:45
- Label: Astralwerks
- Producer: Jorgen Træen

Sondre Lerche chronology
Two Way Monologue (2004)	Duper Sessions (2006)	Phantom Punch (2007)

Professional ratings
Aggregate scores
Source	Rating
Metacritic	70/100
Review scores
Source	Rating
AllMusic	3.5/5 stars
Pitchfork	(6.1/10)
PopMatters	(6/10)

Duper Sessions is the third album by Norwegian singer-songwriter and guitarist Sondre Lerche, released in Norway on 27 February 2006, and in the US on 21 March 2006. The album entered the Billboard Official Top Contemporary Jazz Albums Chart at No. 5. The album was the 4th most added on the CMJ Jazz Chart during the first week of April 2006.

== Track listing ==
All songs by Sondre Lerche unless otherwise noted.

No.	Title	Length
1.	"Everyone's Rooting for You"	2:48
2.	"Minor Detail"	3:34
3.	"Across the Land"	1:17
4.	"The Curse of Being in Love"	3:05
5.	"Dead End Mystery"	3:28
6.	"Night and Day" (Cole Porter)	2:23
7.	"Once in a While"	3:09
8.	"Human Hands" (Elvis Costello)	2:34
9.	"(You Knocked Me) Off My Feet"	4:55
10.	"(I Wanna) Call it Love"	3:16
11.	"Nightingales" (Paddy McAloon)	3:31
12.	"I'm Not From Here"	2:00
13.	"You Sure Look Swell"	4:11
14.	"Lulu-vise" (Knutsen & Ludvigsen (hidden track))	1:34

== Personnel ==
- Sondre Lerche – vocals, guitar, harmonica
- The Faces Down Quartet
  - Eric Halvorsen – piano
  - Morten Skage – upright bass
  - Ole Ludvig Kruger – piano, drums
  - Kato Ådland – guitar, percussion, pedal steel
- Matias J. Monsen – cello
- Mari Boine Persen – violin
- Jesper Riis – string arrangements
- Jørgen Træen – percussion, backing vocals
