= You Know So Well =

EP by Sondre Lerche
- Released: February 2001
- Genre: Rock
- Label: Virgin
- Producer: Jørgen Træen, Sondre Lerche Vaular

You Know So Well is the debut EP of Norwegian artist Sondre Lerche. The EP was only released in Norway.

Lerche released his debut EP You Know So Well in February 2001. His debut single "You Know So Well" was released to the media in Norway in December 2000. In early 2001, the single entered #3 on the National Airplay Chart in Norway, and #2 on the sales chart.

== Track listing ==
| # | Title | Songwriters | Producer(s) | Length | Notes |
|---|---|---|---|---|---|
| 1 | "You Know So Well" | Sondre Lerche Vaular | Jørgen Træen | 4:15 | Album version |
| 2 | "I Know I Know" | Sondre Lerche Vaular | Jørgen Træen | 3:00 | B side |
| 3 | "Don't Be Shallow" | Sondre Lerche Vaular | Jørgen Træen | 4:05 | B side |
| 4 | "Dial Away" | Sondre Lerche Vaular | Sondre Lerche Vaular | 8:44 | Home recording |

== Charts ==
| Chart (2001) | Provider(s) | Peak position |
|---|---|---|
| Norwegian Singles Chart | VG Nett | 2 |
