= Anne Rimmen =

Norwegian television presenter

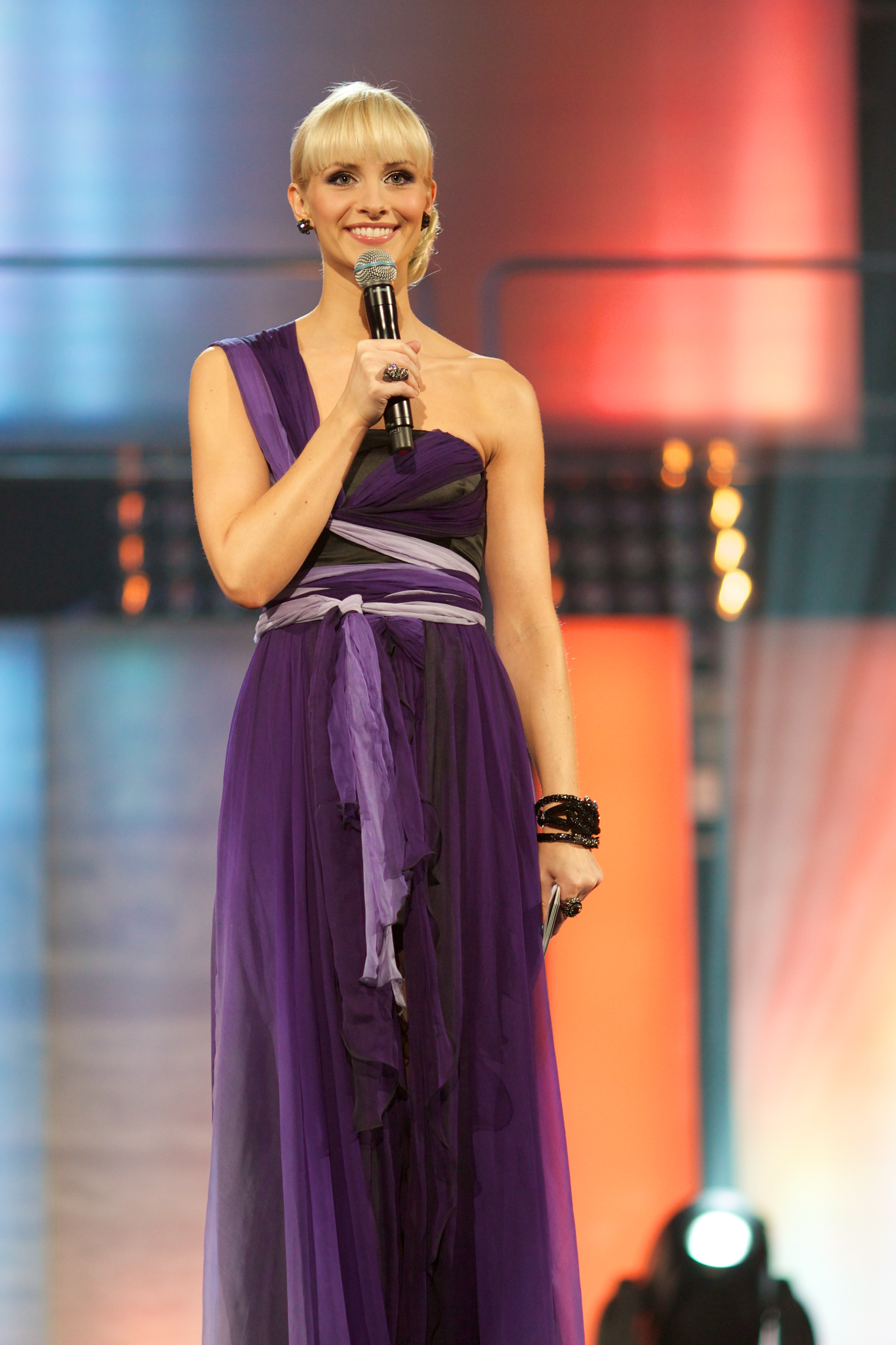
- Anne Rimmen during the Melodi Grand Prix in Skien in 2011.
- Born: Anne Elgård Rimmen; 11 September 1981 (age 44); Denmark
- Occupation: television presenter
- Partner: Ailo Gaup

Anne Elgård Rimmen (born 11 September 1981 in Denmark) is a presenter and former sports anchor for NRK Sport. She was born in Denmark, but moved to Norway as a three-year-old.

Rimmen studied journalism at University of Queensland in Brisbane, Australia. She started her TV career as a video journalist, program manager and editor in Tel Telemark's editorial in Skien. After this, Rimmen worked for the magazine RED and in TVNorge s sports editorial. After joining NRK in September 2007, she was primarily affiliated with NRK Sport, where she was, among other things, the presenter for OL-studio at 2012 Summer Olympics studio from London in addition to being a sports anchor in Dagsrevyen and other news programs on NRK. In the spring of 2011 she was co-hosted the Melodi Grand Prix broadcast together with Per Sundnes.

In 2014 she was the presenter for the NRK program Monsen på villspor.

Anne Rimmen is the sister of TV-personalities Morten Stokstad and Marte Stokstad. She is the domestic partner of Ailo Gaup, and together they have a son and a daughter.
