= Sondre Lerche (album) =

Studio album by Sondre Lerche
- Released: 6 June 2011 (Norway); 7 June 2011 (NA); 5 September 2011 (EU/UK)
- Length: 40:29
- Label: Mona Records
- Producers: Kato Ådland; Nicolas Vernhes

Sondre Lerche chronology
Heartbeat Radio (2009)	Sondre Lerche (2011)	Bootlegs (2012)

Professional ratings
Aggregate scores
Source	Rating
Metacritic	70/100
Review scores
Source	Rating
AllMusic	4/5 stars
Slant Magazine	3.5/5 stars
Rolling Stone	3/5 stars

Sondre Lerche is the sixth album by Norwegian singer-songwriter Sondre Lerche. According to Lerche's official website the new album contains a "raw, spontaneous, instinctive and heartfelt sound" and features collaborations with Midlake drummer McKenzie Smith, longtime producer Kato Ådland, Jupiter One drummer Dave Heilman, and co-producer, mixer and studio owner Nicolas Verhnes (Spoon, Animal Collective).

== Reception ==
In New York's Daily News, Lerche spoke of the city's influence on his writing: "Since it was written in New York, it's more confrontational in the lyrics," he says. "In the past, my records were more reveries, asking the question of who you would want to be. This record is more concerned with trying to figure out what's real, with daring to deal with things as they actually are."

Rolling Stone gave Sondre Lerche 3 out of 5 stars saying, "'To divert my mind/I try to make another love song rhyme,' Sondre Lerche sings on his sixth album. That this couplet (in "Coliseum Town") technically fails to rhyme itself is just one of many wry touches on Sondre Lerche. The Norwegian-born singer-songwriter mixes his usual verbose confessionals with sparser production than on past efforts, sifting in raw, chilly blues ("Tied Up to the Tide") and touches of country ("Go Right Ahead"). As 2009's Heartbeat Radio hinted, and Sondre Lerche cements, the man has grown since his early-2000s days as an indie-pop prodigy: Now a dependably intriguing wordsmith, he still shows no shortage of unusually intelligent quirks."

Entertainment Weekly gave Sondre Lerche a grade of 'A−' writing, "Winsome Norwegian Lerche is fast becoming indie rock's Burt Bacharach with his clever, unobtrusive lyrics and artful melding of jazzy folk with punchy power pop. A− —Joe Lynch"

SPIN rated Sondre Lerche 8 out of 10 stating, "For album six, this notoriously restless Norwegian flouts expectation in the oddest way yet: He repeats himself. Offering a slightly subtler take on the style-shuffling of 2009's Heartbeat Radio, Lerche somehow never loses cohesion. Chalk it up to his honeyed voice and unfailing pop craft, whether he's playing taut Bacharach chamber folk ("Ricochet"), Costello-clever pub rock ("Private Caller"), bluesy Lennon-esque psychedelia ("Tied Up to the Tide"), or frenzied synth strangeness ("Go Right Ahead").

== Track listing ==
1. "Ricochet" – 4:20
2. "Private Caller" – 3:43
3. "Red Flags" – 4:34
4. "Go Right Ahead" – 3:25
5. "Coliseum Town" – 3:12
6. "Never Mind the Typos" – 4:32
7. "Domino" – 3:29
8. "Living Dangerously" – 3:56
9. "Tied Up to the Tide" – 5:20
10. "When the River" – 3:58

Amazon.com bonus track

11. "Guilty" – 2:37

iTunes Store bonus track

11. "Wither Street" – 3:32
