= May (singer) =

South Korean singer

- Born: Bang Yu-jeong; 6 May 1982 (age 43)
- Origin: South Korea
- Genres: K-Pop; J-Pop
- Occupation: Singer
- Instrument: Acoustic guitar
- Years active: 2006-present

Bang Yu-jeong (Korean: 방유정; born 6 May 1982), better known by the stage names May (Korean: 메이; Japanese: メイ) and Yuu (Korean: 유우) is a South Korean singer active in Japan.

== Career ==
=== Wonderland ===
May is a Korean artist who made her debut in 2006, but wasn't able to gain any success on her releases. May started her music career singing "Miracle" as a theme song along with a F.I.R. cover song "Lydia" as an insert song for a popular Seoul Broadcasting System (SBS) weekend drama "Friends" in late 2005. On 7 March 2006, May had a contract with CJ Music releasing her first EP or mini album entitled "Wonderland" that featured seven songs.

=== Smile ===
Three months later, on 2 June 2006, May released her second EP or mini album "Smile" with a different publisher, Doremi Media. "Smile" reached number 27 in the chart. She also covered another song from F.I.R which was, "Fly Away". May released two versions of "Smile": a first press limited version with her "M" symbol, and a regular version without the "M" symbol.

=== A Little Happiness ===
Early in 2005, Avex launched a project called Show Case Live. It featured samples of eight upcoming artists, including May. She signed under the Avex label later that year. On 21 February 2006, May released her first single "Wonderland", which failed to chart on Oricon. Before Mat's "Smile" EP, she released her second single "Kienai Niji" in May 2006 also failing to chart. On 26 July 2006, May released "Surrender (c/w Lydia)", her third single, which gained her little success. May released her fourth single in autumn on 8 November 2006. By 10 January 2007, Sarai no Kaze was released as her fifth single. By end of the month May released her first album "a Little Happiness".

=== Japanese tour ===
MAY started a tour in 2007, after releasing her sixth single "Onna Gokoro" on 4 April 2007.

== Discography ==
=== Studio albums ===
| Title | Album details | Peak chart positions | Sales |
| Title | Album details | JPN | Sales |
Japanese
| A Little Happiness | Released: 31 January 2006; Label: Avex IO | 92 | —N/a |

=== Extended plays ===
| Title | Album details | Peak chart positions | Sales |
| Title | Album details | KOR | Sales |
Korean
| Wonderland | Released: 7 March 2006; Label: CJ E&M Music | — | —N/a |
| Smile | Released: 14 June 2006; Label: Doremi Media | — | —N/a |
"—" denotes album did not chart.

=== Singles ===
| Title | Year | Peak chart positions | | Album |
| Title | Year | JPN | KOR | Album |
Japanese
| 『Wonderland』 | 2006 | — | No data* | A Little Happiness |
| 『消えない虹』 | 2006 | — | No data* | A Little Happiness |
| 『Surrender』 | 2006 | — | No data* | A Little Happiness |
| 『木枯らしの純情』 | 2006 | — | No data* | A Little Happiness |
| 『サライの風』 | 2007 | 132 | No data* | Non-album singles |
| 『オンナゴコロ』 | 2007 | — | No data* | Non-album singles |
| 『Kizuna』 | 2007 | — | No data* | Non-album singles |
Korean
| "Wonderland" | 2006 | — | No data* | Wonderland |
| "Wicked Me" (못된 나) | 2008 | — | No data* | Non-album singles |
| "Winter Wonderland" | 2008 | — | No data* | Non-album singles |
"—" denotes single did not chart or was not released in that region. *No chart data available from South Korean Gaon Chart prior to 2010.
