= Phantom Punch (album) =

Studio album by Sondre Lerche
- Released: February 6, 2007 (US)
- Recorded: April 2006 – May 2006
- Genre: Pop
- Length: 38:42
- Label: Astralwerks
- Producer: Tony Hoffer

Sondre Lerche chronology
Duper Sessions (2006)	Phantom Punch (2007)	Daytrotter Session (2007)

Professional ratings
Aggregate scores
Source	Rating
Metacritic	75/100
Review scores
Source	Rating
AllMusic	4/5 stars
Pitchfork	6.6/10
Rolling Stone	3/5 stars

Phantom Punch is the fourth album by Norwegian singer-songwriter and guitarist Sondre Lerche. The album was released in the U.S. on February 6, 2007, and in Norway, Italy and Canada on February 19 that year.

The first single, "Phantom Punch", was released in August 2006. Norwegian Radio P3 held a contest to decide who would direct the video. Kristoffer Borgli won the contest, and the video he directed was released October 25, 2006. The next single to be released was "Say It All" (November 2006); the video for the single was also released in November. The third single is "The Tape" and was released in the UK in April.

== Track listing ==
All songs written by Sondre Lerche.

No.	Title	Length
1.	"Airport Taxi Reception"	2:28
2.	"The Tape"	2:37
3.	"Say It All"	3:53
4.	"Phantom Punch"	3:00
5.	"Tragic Mirror"	3:58
6.	"Face the Blood"	2:16
7.	"John, Let Me Go"	4:07
8.	"Well Well Well"	3:27
9.	"After All"	3:05
10.	"She's Fantastic"	2:23
11.	"Happy Birthday Girl"	7:28

- The song "John, Let Me Go" is an alternate recording of the same song released on the Two Way Monologue EP (not to be confused with the full-length album of the same name), but the song was then titled "Johnny Johnny, Ooh Ooh".
