= Fantorangen =

Norwegian children's television character

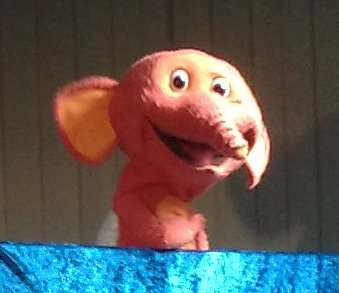
Fantorangen performs live in Fredrikstad, 2009

Fantorangen is a Norwegian television character known from Norwegian Broadcasting Corporation (NRK), where they have their own program on the children's channel NRK Super. The puppet has been operated by Berit Nermoen, Miriam Jacobsen and currently Inger Gundersen.

The physical puppet was created in 2007 by visual artist Tiina Suhonen in collaboration with NRK's costume department. With their slightly mischievous personality, they have become one of NRK's most popular characters for children. As a result of the success, music videos, books and licensed products have been made with Fantorangen, including acts with Berit Nermoen at various festivals and other cultural events.

== History ==
Fantorangen was originally called "Orangufanten", and was a mixture of an orangutan and an elephant. Orangufanten + two other characters (Kuraffen and Elgøyen) was created by Endre Skandfer at Qvisten Animation for a vignette for NRK's BarneTV. Later they were redesigned and renamed Fantorangen for the launch of the TV channel NRK Super. Fantorangen was given their present form in 2007, by Stig Saxegaard at Qvisten Animation, for a new set of animated vignettes. NRK later made a puppet of Fantorangen. The leading puppet maker was visual artist Tiina Suhonen.

In December 2007, Fantorangen debuted with their own program for young children (2–4 years) in conjunction with the launch of the new channel NRK Super. The program ran seven days a week for 30 minutes, and Fantorangen typically made two or three appearances.

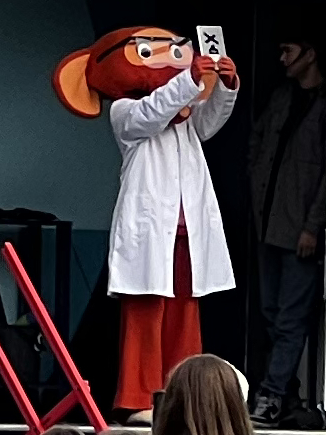
Fantorangen in Vestby, 2022

The character Fantorangen featured in an episode of Lilyhammer in which it was stolen from the prop store at the TV studios and used to entertain children and the twins at their birthday party. In the 2021 James Bond film No Time to Die, Mathilde watches Fantorangen on TV while James Bond makes her breakfast.

== Setting ==
Initially Fantorangen lived in a submarine in the ocean in a universe where he lived with four of his friends one of them being Kuraffen, who has been his friend since 2002. They told stories about growing up in the jungle, and their experiences with friends in the sea. At that time, Fantorangen's favorite food was introduced as sjøbanan ("sea-banana").

The big change came with the new program in 2010 that led to significant changes in setting. Gone was the submarine, and in its place there was a kind of Caribbean pirate atmosphere of jungle and pirate ship. This was, however, limited in duration, and in 2011 was replaced by a simpler set design based on a nest in which Fantorangen lives.

== Critical response ==
The program has been commended for the quality of its pacing and content, scoring a score of 20/20 by the Kids' Slow Media Project.
