= Faces Down =

Studio album by Sondre Lerche
- Released: September 17, 2002
- Length: 53:25 (UK); 59:58 (US)

Sondre Lerche chronology
You Know So Well (2001)	Faces Down (2001)	Two Way Monologue (2004)

Professional ratings
Review scores
Source	Rating
AllMusic	4/5 stars
Blender	3/5 stars
Drowned in Sound	2/10
Pitchfork	7.4/10
Rolling Stone	3/5 stars
Slant	4/5 stars

Faces Down is the first album released by Norwegian singer-songwriter Sondre Lerche, on September 17, 2002. Lerche wrote all the songs on the album.

The track "Modern Nature" featured prominently in the 2007 film Dan in Real Life, starring Steve Carell and Juliette Binoche; Lerche and his band The Faces Down make a cameo appearance in the movie performing the track.

== Track listing ==
No.	Title	Length
1.	"Dead Passengers"
2.	"You Know So Well"
3.	"Sleep on Needles"
4.	"Suffused with Love"
5.	"Side Two"
6.	"Modern Nature" (with Lillian Samdal)
7.	"Virtue and Wine"
8.	"On and Off Again"
9.	"No One's Gonna Come"
10.	"All Luck Ran Out"
11.	"Things You Call Fate"
12.	"Rosebud" (US edition bonus track)

"Don't Be Shallow" (Japanese edition bonus track)
