= Two Way Monologue =

Studio album by Sondre Lerche
- Released: 9 March 2004
- Recorded: August 2002 – January 2003
- Genre: Indie Pop
- Length: 47:34
- Label: Astralwerks
- Producer: Jørgen Træen and HP Gundersen

Sondre Lerche chronology
Faces Down (2001)	Two Way Monologue (2004)	Duper Sessions (2006)

Professional ratings
Aggregate scores
Source	Rating
Metacritic	78/100
Review scores
Source	Rating
AllMusic	4.5/5 stars
The Guardian	3/5 stars
Pitchfork	7.8/10
PopMatters	4.5/5 stars
Rolling Stone	3/5 stars

Two Way Monologue is the second album release by the Norwegian singer-songwriter Sondre Lerche, released in 2004.

== Track listing ==
All songs written by Sondre Lerche.

No.	Title	Length
1.	"Love You"	1:37
2.	"Track You Down"	4:38
3.	"On the Tower"	3:49
4.	"Two Way Monologue"	5:42
5.	"Days That Are Over"	4:09
6.	"Wet Ground"	3:11
7.	"Counter Spark"	4:13
8.	"It's Over"	3:11
9.	"Stupid Memory"	4:10
10.	"It's Too Late"	5:18
11.	"It's Our Job"	2:47
12.	"Maybe You're Gone"	4:49
13.	"Johnny Johnny Ooh Ooh" (Japanese edition bonus track)	23:45

== Personnel ==
- All songs written and composed by Sondre Lerche Vaular.
- Produced by Jørgen Træen and HP Gundersen.
- Arranged by the artist and the producers.
- Logo and Cover design by Dave Kinsey, BLK/MRKT
