= Sondre Lerche =

Norwegian musician

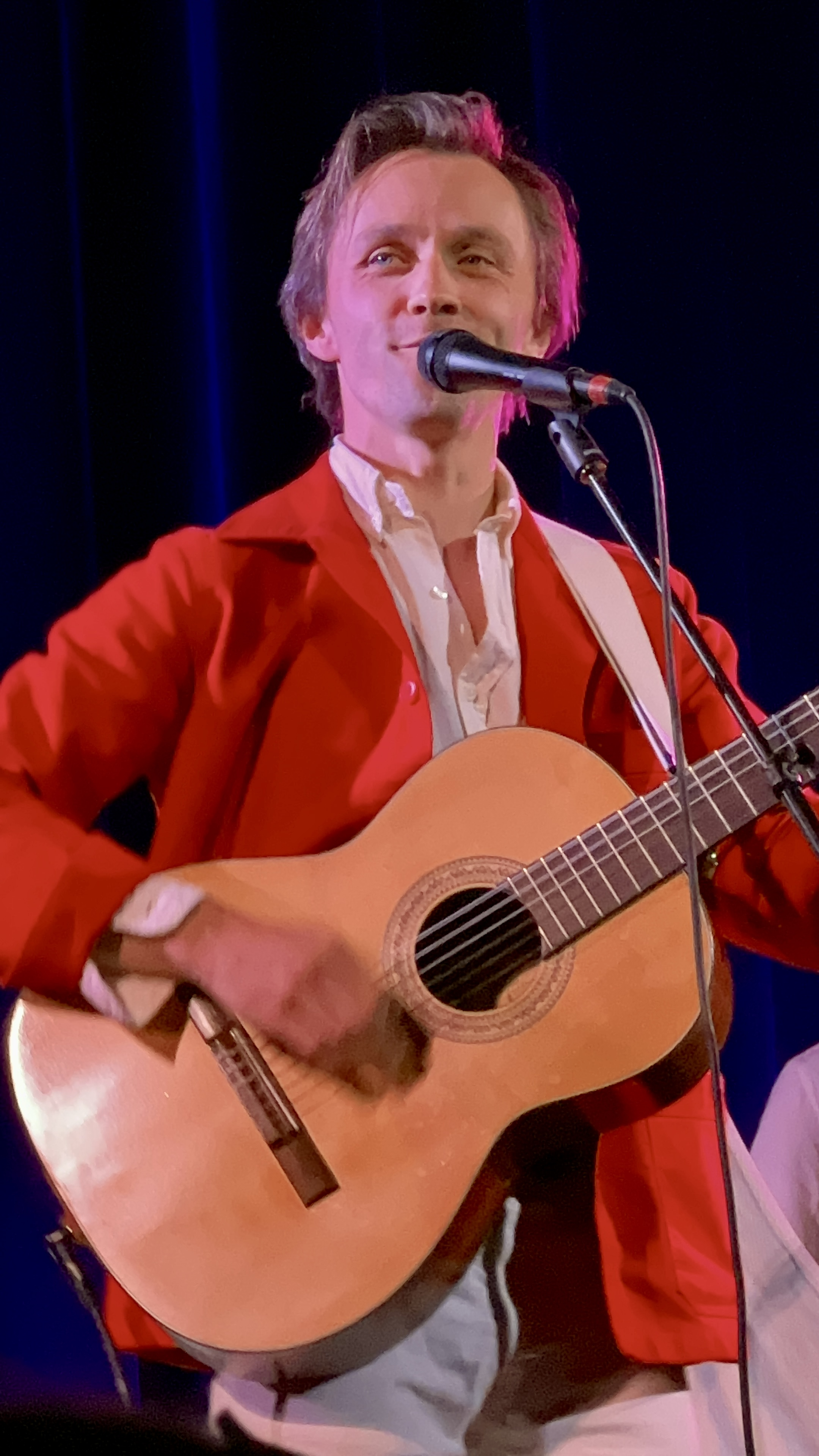
- Lerche performing in 2022
- Born: Sondre Lerche Vaular; 5 September 1982 (age 44); Bergen, Norway
- Occupations: Singer; songwriter
- Years active: 2000–present
- Works: Discography
- Spouse: Mona Fastvold (m. 2005; div. 2013)
- Partner(s): Linnéa Myhre (2013–2020); Hilde Solli (2023–present)
- Musical career
- Genres: Pop; indie rock; jazz
- Instruments: Vocals; guitar; harmonica; bass; glockenspiel; keyboards; piano; percussion; Hammond
- Labels: EMI Norway; Astralwerks; Yep Roc; Mona Records; PLZ

- Website: sondrelerche.com

Sondre Lerche (Norwegian pronunciation: [ˈsɔndrə ˈlærkə]; born 5 September 1982) is a Norwegian singer, songwriter, musician and actor.

== Early life ==
Growing up in a suburb of Bergen, Lerche was heavily influenced by 1980s pop. He was fascinated by bands such as the Beatles, A-ha, the Beach Boys, and Prefab Sprout, and began formal guitar instruction at the age of eight. In addition to classical instruction, Lerche's teacher introduced him to Brazilian music, such as bossa nova, and thus formed the foundation of Lerche's array of complex melodies and chords. By the age of fourteen, he had already written some songs, such as "Locust Girl." He performed in acoustic gigs at the club where his sister worked while he was still under age. Norwegian producer H.P. Gundersen "discovered" Lerche, and began to mentor him, exposing him to diverse music genres, including psychedelia, 1960s pop, and mainstream Brazilian music.

== Career ==
Lerche met with Oslo-based manager Tatiana Penzo, leading up to a deal with Virgin Norway signed in 2000. His popularity in his home country increased steadily, and, in 2000, he recorded his debut album, Faces Down.

Faces Down was released in 2001, after Lerche finished school. In the interim, he was named Best New Act at the Norwegian Grammys (Spellemannprisen) and performed locally in support of major acts such as Beth Orton. Faces Down was officially released in Norway in September 2001 and gradually throughout all of Europe. He toured with various acts, and appeared with his long-time idols, a-ha, in Oslo. Autumn 2002 saw the release of Faces Down in America and Lerche's first major tour of the United States. Faces Down was a hit in Norway and received critical praise in Norway and the United States — Rolling Stone Magazine placed it in their top 50 albums of 2002. He released the live/studio collection Don't Be Shallow EP the following year. In 2003, he toured with another one of his musical heroes, Elvis Costello (they toured together once again in 2005).

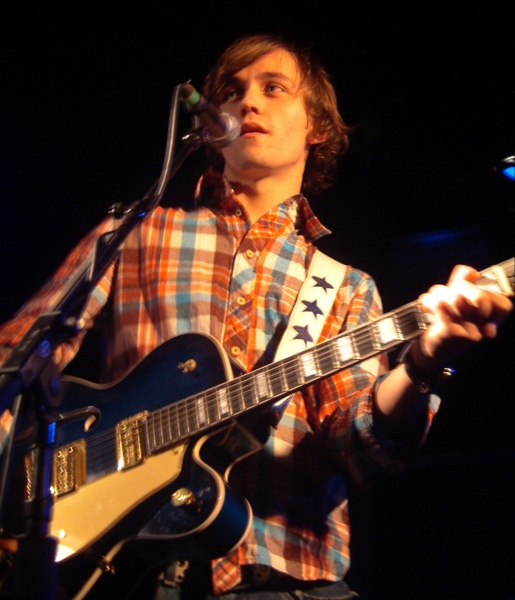
Lerche in 2004

In 2004, his second album was released, Two Way Monologue, also produced by Gundersen. It was very well received, with positive reviews in Rolling Stone and Pitchfork. Devon Powers of Popmatters praised Lerche's "contagious musical sensibilities, exhilarating vigor and downright stupefying songcraft," and noted that "Lerche manages to both push himself and maintain an allegiance to his ways – something artists twice his age have trouble doing."

On 27 February 2006, Duper Sessions was released. The jazz album was recorded in the fall of 2005 with his band the Faces Down and pianist Erik Halvorsen at Duper Studios in Bergen. The album reached No. 21 on the Billboard Jazz Albums chart.

His 2007 release was Phantom Punch. Lerche and the Faces Down recorded and mixed the album in Los Angeles in April and May 2006, with producer Tony Hoffer.

In September 2009, Lerche released Heartbeat Radio, to critical acclaim. In his review, Mikael Wood of the Los Angeles Times wrote, "No matter what genre he's working in – fuzzy garage rock, breezy vocal jazz, acoustic folk-pop – this young Norwegian singer-songwriter crafts catchier choruses than many musicians who’ve been working twice as long as he has." Allmusic Guide's Tim Sendra called Heartbeat Radio Lerche's "best work to date."

In June 2011, Lerche released the self-titled Sondre Lerche, on his own Mona Records. The album was praised by Rolling Stone, The New York Times, Stereogum, Filter, Spin, and Entertainment Weekly among others for its experimentation with contrasting musical sounds. In the studio, Lerche wanted to explore his new creative alliances in Williamsburg, the Brooklyn neighborhood where he'd lived on and off for the previous six years. The album was recorded – live in the studio – and mixed in a short but intense time period of three weeks. The sessions included fellow musicians – Midlake drummer McKenzie Smith, longtime producer/collaborator Kato Ådland, Dave Heilman (drummer for Regina Spektor), and co-producer, mixer, and owner of Rare Book Room Studio, Nicolas Verhnes (Spoon, Animal Collective).

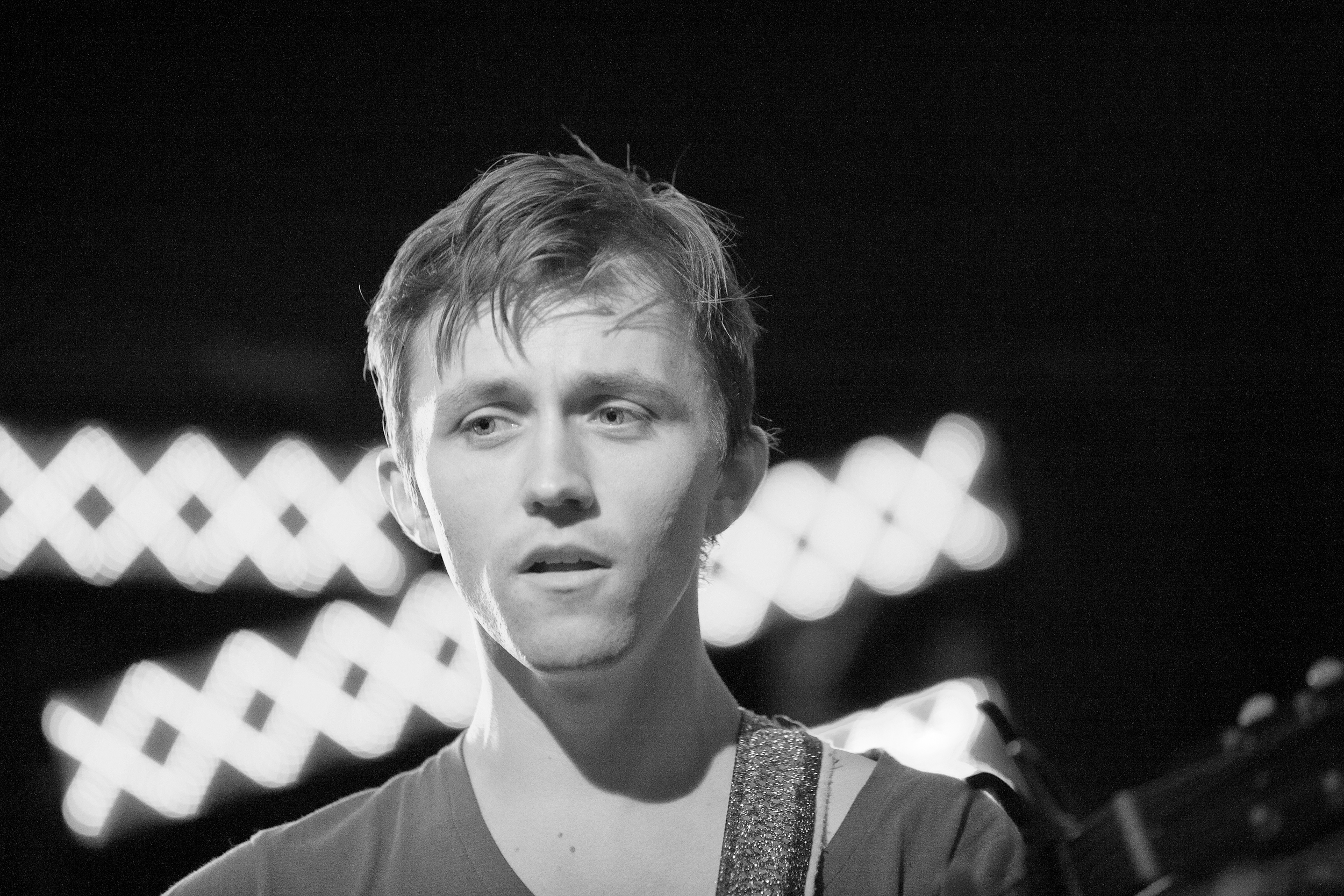
Lerche in 2012

Lerche celebrated his 30th birthday with the release of his first live album, Bootlegs, in 2012.

He released his seventh album, Please, following his divorce from Mona Fastvold. The album was released on 23 September 2014 on Mona Records. "Bad Law" was released as the main single for the album in May 2014, supported by a music video released that June.

On 3 March 2017, Lerche released his eighth studio album, Pleasure, on the PLZ label. On 24 November that year the songs from Pleasure were also released in a stripped down solo version titled Solo Pleasure. Solo Pleasure was released digitally on 14 February 2018.

In April 2022, Lerche released a double album, Avatars of Love. It was followed in 2026 by the album Acrobats.

== Other ventures ==
=== Acting ===
Lerche made his musical theatre debut in the Norwegian stage production of Moulin Rouge! The Musical, in which he played the lead role of Christian; the show premiered at Chateau Neuf in Oslo in August 2023. Karen Frøsland Nystøyl of NRK reviewed his performance and wrote that he appeared to be a better singer than an actor, while commenting that his performance improved when sharing the stage with co-star Heidi Ruud Ellingsen. The production as a whole received a perfect 6/6 review from Aftenposten. Lerche's other acting appearances include voice acting in the animated films Two Buddies and a Badger (Note: Originally released in Norway under the title Knutsen & Ludvigsen og den fæle Rasputin.) (2015) and Askepote (2024). In December 2025, he appeared as a fictionalized version of himself in the Norwegian mockumentary TV series Helt perfekt.

=== Writing ===
As a writer in his native Norwegian, Lerche has published two books containing essays on music, Et slags julekort / Aldri forstumme in 2019, and Alle sanger handler om deg in 2020. The latter was positively reviewed by Gry Elise Jacobsen of NRK, who remarked that the book's 22 essays gave insight into Lerche's inspirations and how he thinks about music. In 2021, Lerche contributed an essay on running to the anthology book Endelig sommer.

Lerche has also published two Norwegian children's books, the Christmas-themed Snømannens jul in 2020, and En flue fløy in 2021. He wrote the text of both books, which were illustrated by Victoria Sandøy.

== Personal life ==
In 2005, Lerche married director and actress Mona Fastvold. They divorced in 2013. Lerche was in a relationship with writer and blogger Linnéa Myhre from 2013 to 2020. His current partner is photographer Hilde Solli, as of 2023.

Lerche returned to Norway in 2020. Prior to that, he lived in Los Angeles and Brooklyn, New York, where he resided from 2005 to 2018.

He is the cousin of Norwegian rapper Lars Vaular. In 2012, they collaborated on the single "Øynene Lukket".

== Discography ==
Studio albums

- Faces Down (2001)
- Two Way Monologue (2004)
- Duper Sessions (2006)
- Phantom Punch (2007)
- Heartbeat Radio (2009)
- Sondre Lerche (2011)
- Please (2014)
- Pleasure (2017)
- Patience (2020)
- Avatars of Love (2022)
- Acrobats (2026)

== Filmography ==
Year	Work	Role	Notes	Ref.
2007	Dan in Real Life	Self (Wedding Singer)	Cameo, also soundtrack composer	
2012–15	The Voice – Norges beste stemme	Self (Coach)	Seasons 1–3	
2013	Big Star: Nothing Can Hurt Me	Self	Documentary	
2015	Two Buddies and a Badger	Pizzatrynet	Voice	
2020	And In My Dreams: Patience Extravaganza	Self	Concert film/livestream	
2024	Askepote	Prinsen	Voice	
2025	Stop Time	Self	Concert film	
2025	Helt perfekt	Self (Fictionalized)	TV series; 1 episode	

== Books written ==
- Et slags julekort / Aldri forstumme (2019)
- Alle sanger handler om deg (2020)
- Snømannens jul (illustrated by Victoria Sandøy, 2020)
- En flue fløy (illustrated by Victoria Sandøy, 2021)

== Awards ==
- Newcomer Spellemannprisen (2001)
- Alternative Pop/Rock Album, Avatars of Love Spellemannprisen (2022)

== Notes ==
Awards
Preceded by Briskeby	Recipient of the Newcomer Spellemannprisen; 2001	Succeeded by Gåte
