= Tons of Rock =

Heavy metal festival in Oslo

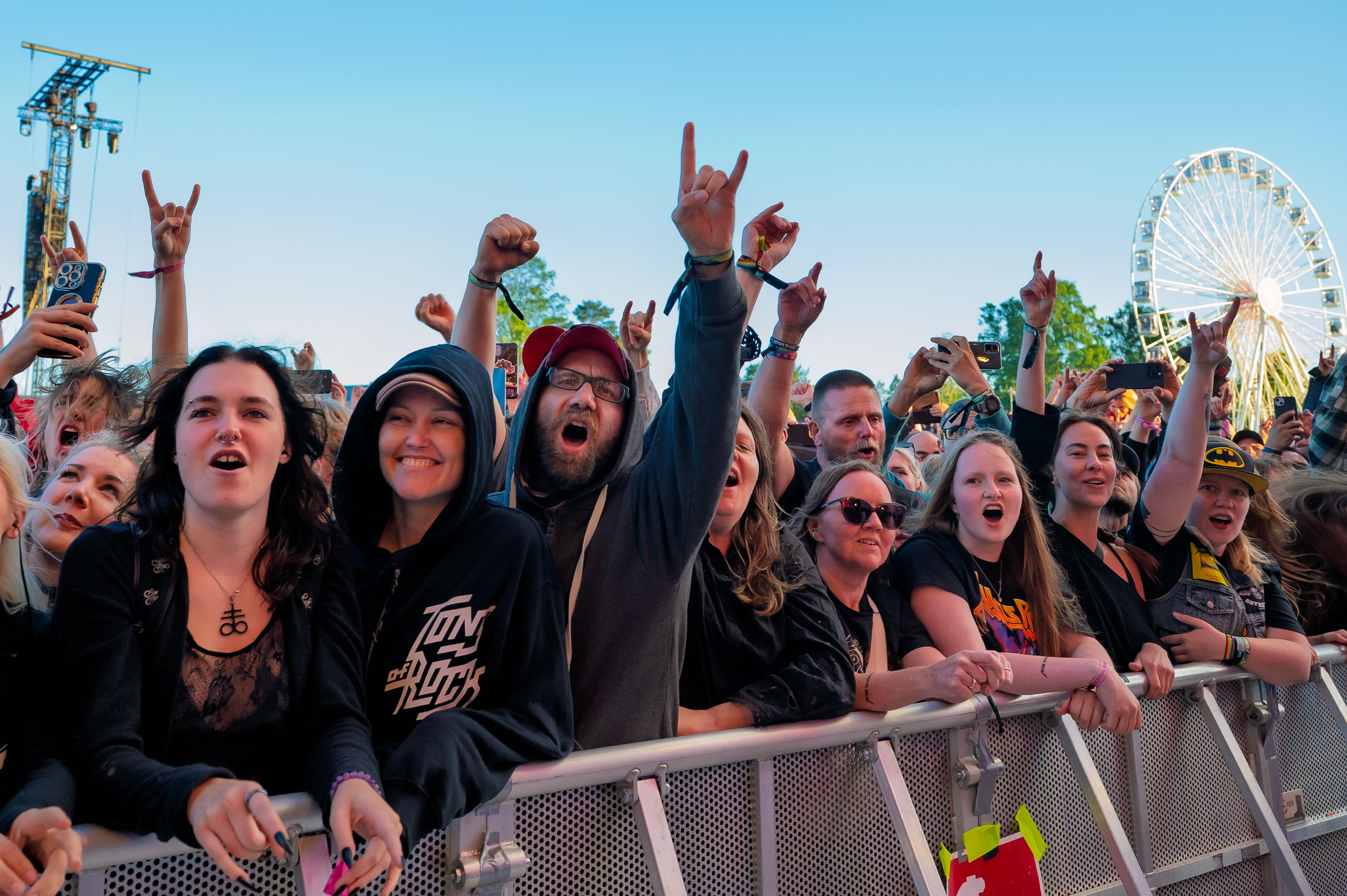
- Audience at Tons of Rock in 2024
- Genre: Heavy metal, hard rock, all genres of metal/rock
- Dates: June
- Locations: Ekebergsletta, Oslo, Norway
- Years active: 2014-present
- Organiser: Live Nation
- Website: tonsofrock.no

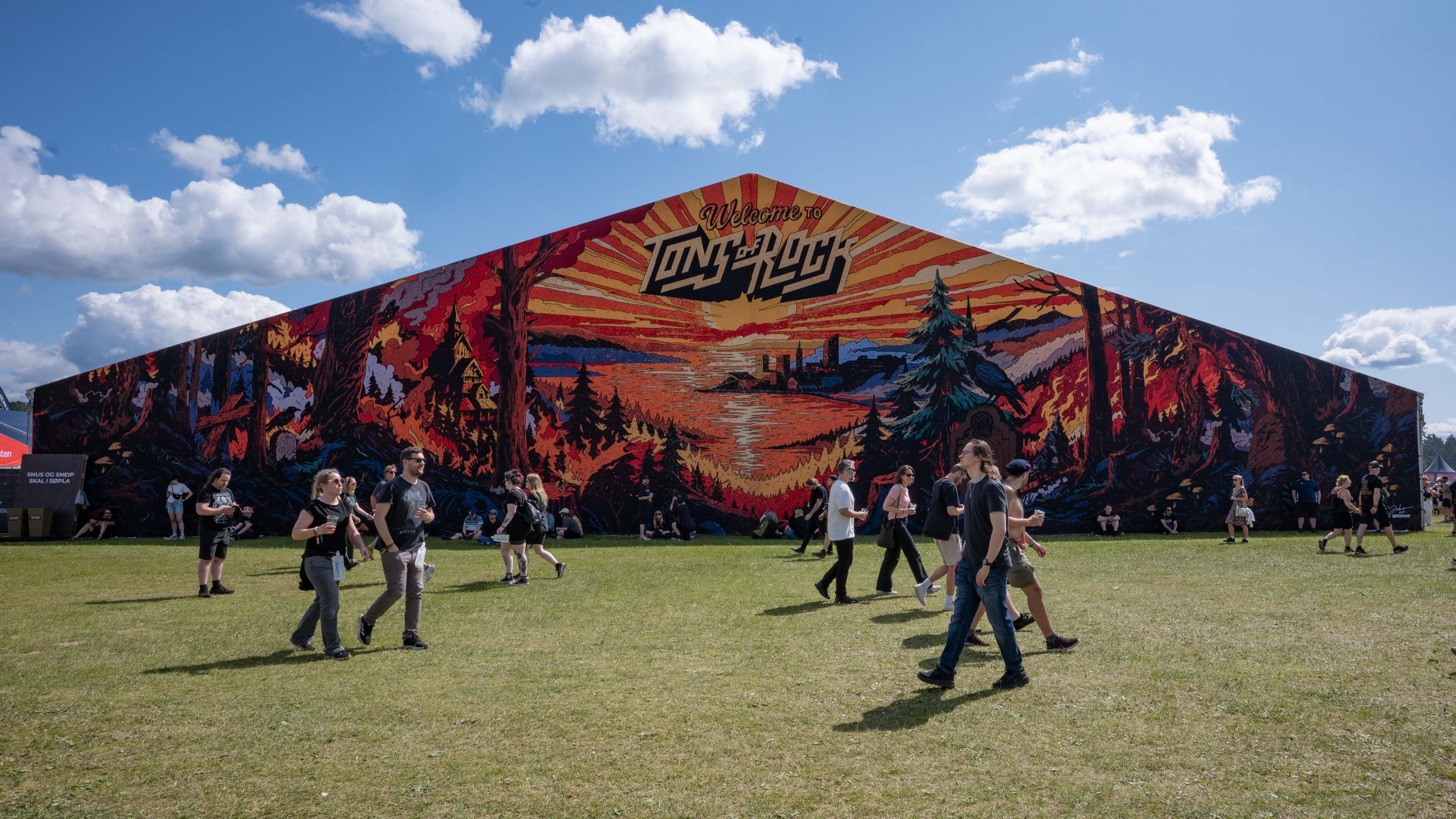
Short end of the Storm stage hangar in 2025

Tons of Rock is an annual hard rock and metal festival hosted at Ekebergsletta in Oslo, Norway. Since its inception in 2014, it has established itself as the leading festival for hard rock and heavy metal in Norway.

In 2022, it was reported that the core audience consists of adult attendees from across Norway, with a wide age range and approximately equal numbers of women and men. In 2025, the festival claimed that it attracts an international audience from more than 80 countries.

After relocating from the small town of Halden to Oslo in 2019, the festival came under majority ownership by Live Nation Norway, which now holds 51% of the shares, while the four founders retain the remainder.

Festival headliners have included Iron Maiden, Metallica, Black Sabbath, Ozzy Osbourne, Megadeth, Alice In Chains, Kiss, W.A.S.P., Faith No More, Pantera, Deep Purple, Bring Me The Horizon, and Muse.

The festival stages are all named after Munch paintings.

== History ==
The first iteration of the festival was held at Fredriksten Fortress in Halden in 2014, featuring hard rock and heavy metal. In 2017, the festival was awarded the title "Festival of the Year" by the Norwegian Concert Organizers Association.

The Norwegian humor rock band Black Debbath, who have participated in every single edition of the festival, released a song dedicated to the festival on their 2018 album "Norsk Barsk Metal".

=== Moving to Oslo, Munch Museum collaboration (2019) ===
After five years of hosting the festival in Halden, the festival was moved to Ekebergsletta, Oslo, in 2019. The same year, Live Nation Norway became the festival’s majority owner with a 51% stake.

The 2019 festival opened early with a special event at the Oslo Opera House, featuring German hard rock band Accept joined by members of the Norwegian Radio Orchestra for a unique crossover concert.

Another collaboration that emerged in connection with the move to Oslo was with the Munch Museum, as two of the festival stages were named after well-known paintings by Edvard Munch.

=== COVID 19-cancellations (2020–2021) ===
Tons of Rock 2020 had to be canceled due to the coronavirus pandemic. The festival received NOK 37 million in compensation from the Arts Council Norway, which distributed a total of NOK 120 million to canceled festivals. Because the festival had low expenses in 2020, the profit – after receiving support from the Arts Council – amounted to NOK 33.8 million, compared to NOK 3.3 million in 2019.

In April 2021, the festival once again had to be canceled due to the coronavirus pandemic.

=== Green profile (2022) ===
In 2022, Tons of Rock was certified as an Eco-Lighthouse (Miljøfyrtårn). Green Nation is festival owner Live Nation’s global sustainability program, an initiative to reduce the environmental impact of concerts and festivals worldwide and to share best practices across countries and events.

=== Steady growth, additional stages (2023–) ===
Since 2023, Tons of Rock has been the largest festival in Norway with 100.000 visitors, which increased to 150.000 in 2024.

In 2025, as a nod to the festival’s roots, "Tons of Rock at the Fortress" was staged as a one-off opening concert at Akershus Fortress, where the Staff Band of the Norwegian Armed Forces performed rock and metal classics with guest soloists from the Norwegian rock scene—an event inspired by the Opera House crossover concert with Accept in 2019.

The 2025 opening speech was delivered by Jens Stoltenberg, former Secretary General of NATO and Norway’s current Minister of Finance. That year, the festival expanded from three to four stages. In addition to Scream Stage, Vampire Stage, and the tented Moonlight Stage, the festival introduced the smaller Storm Stage, inside a hangar. It had interviews led by Tarjei Strøm, plus there were stand-up acts and concerts with up-and-coming artists.

Clips from the 2025 festival went viral after Green Day frontman Billie Joe Armstrong joined Sex Pistols w/Frank Carter for the song "Anarchy in the U.K."

=== Gallery ===
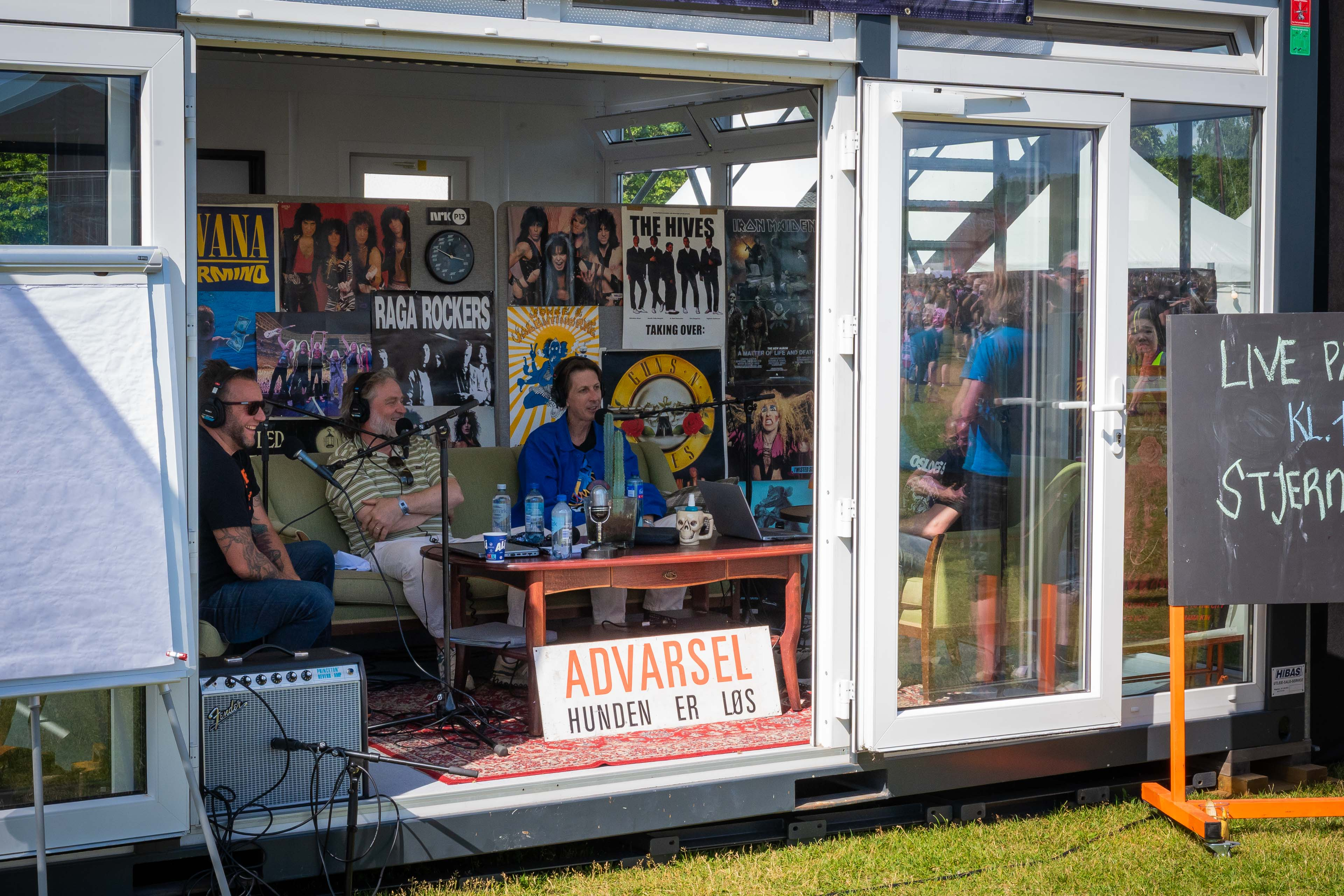
The NRK P13 radio program Stjernepose broadcasts live daily from the festival, featuring interviews with musicians performing there that day.

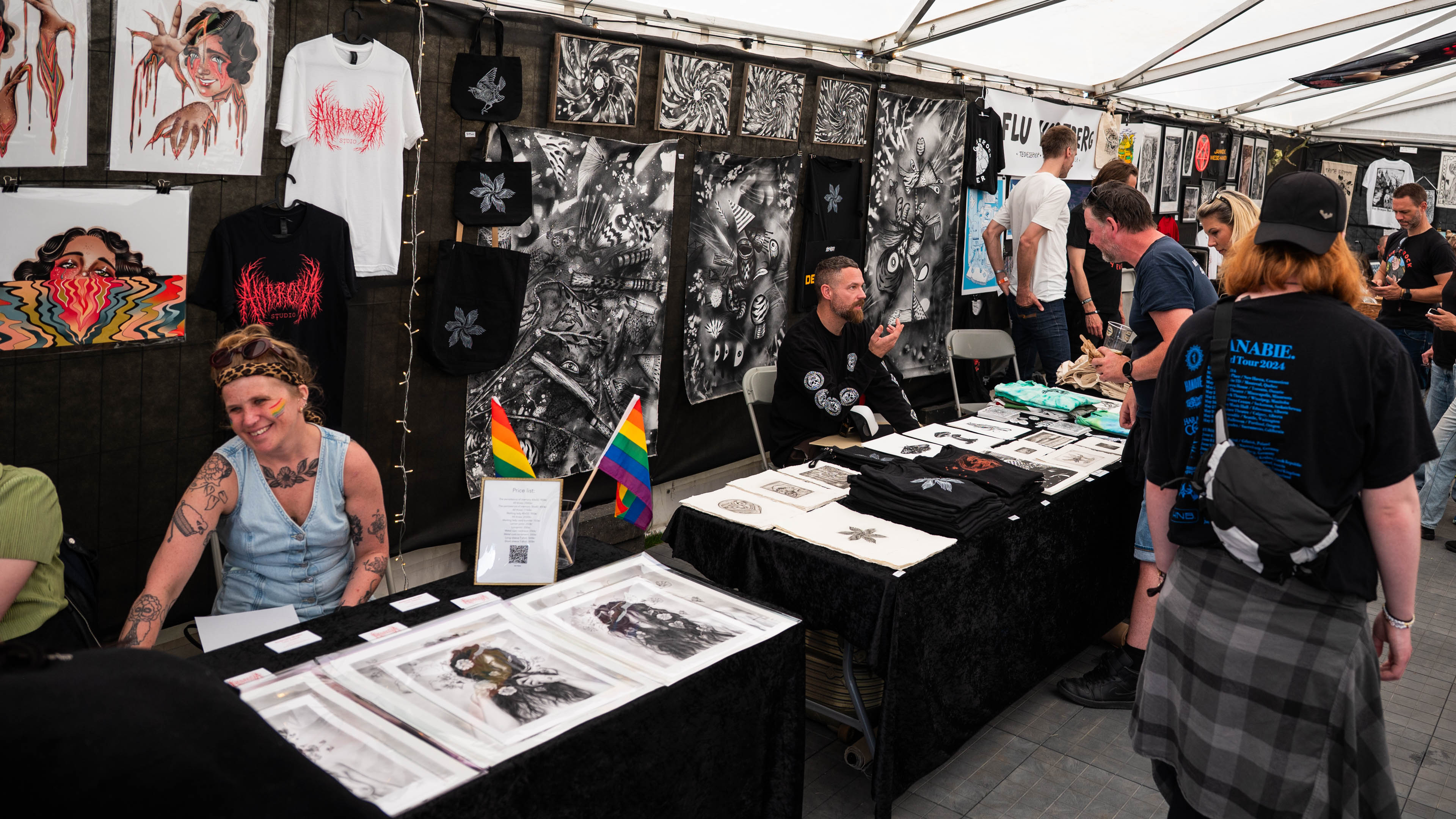
The festival has official festival artists, and other artists may also exhibit and sell their works.

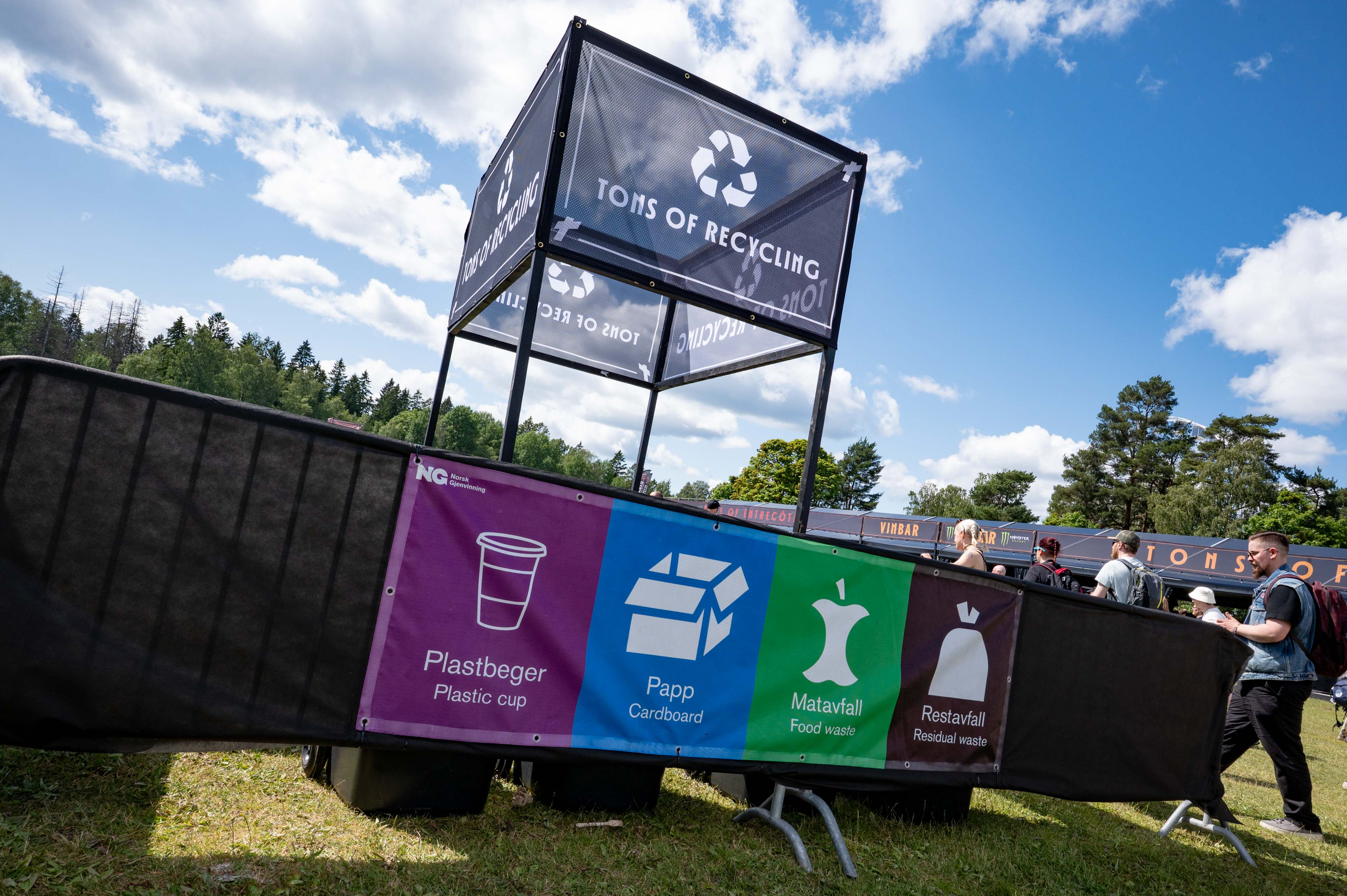
Waste is sorted using several large sorting stations distributed throughout the area, which are frequently emptied and maintained by volunteers.

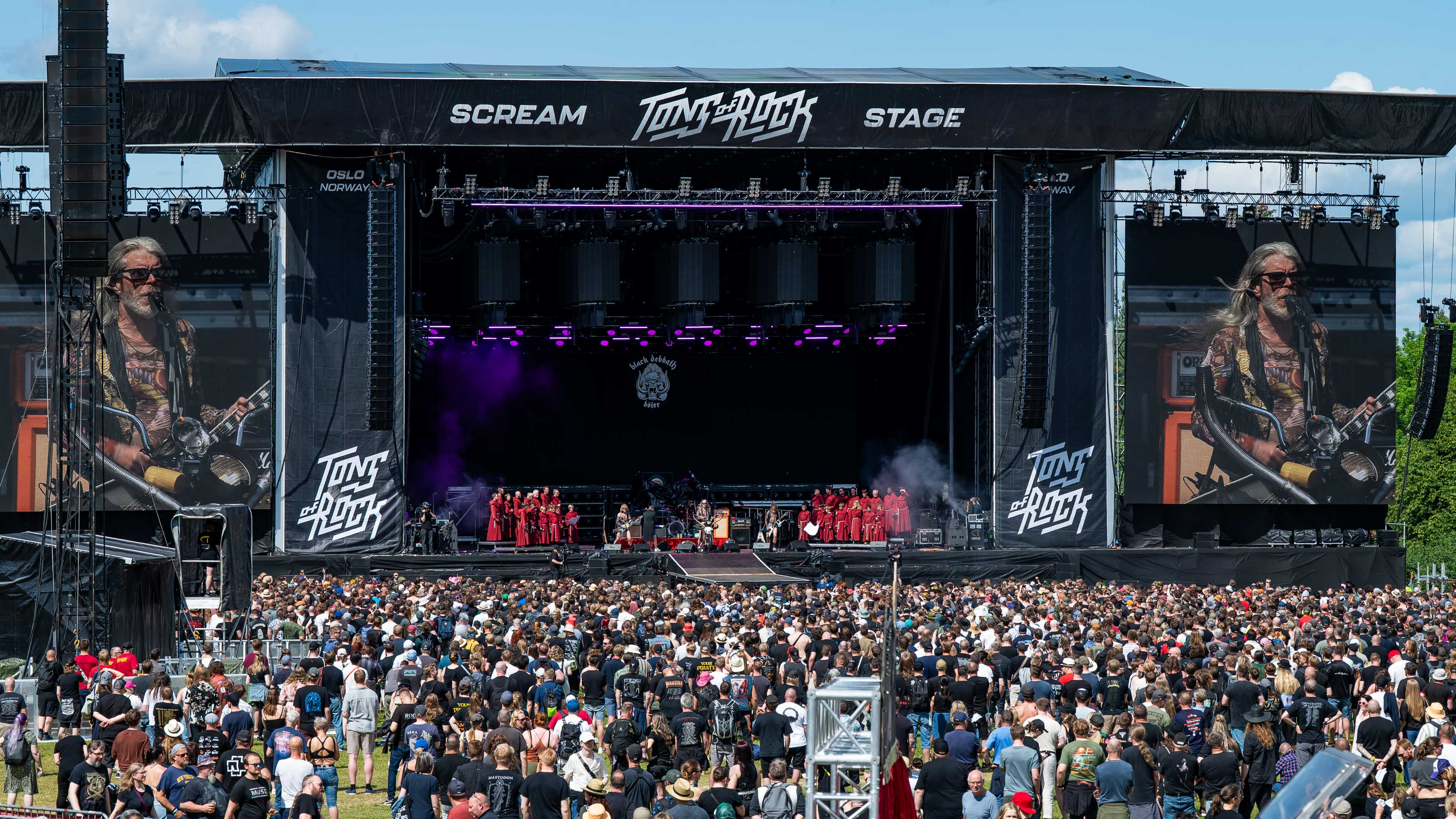
The main stage is “Scream,” and there are also stages named “Vampire,” “Moonlight,” and “Storm.”

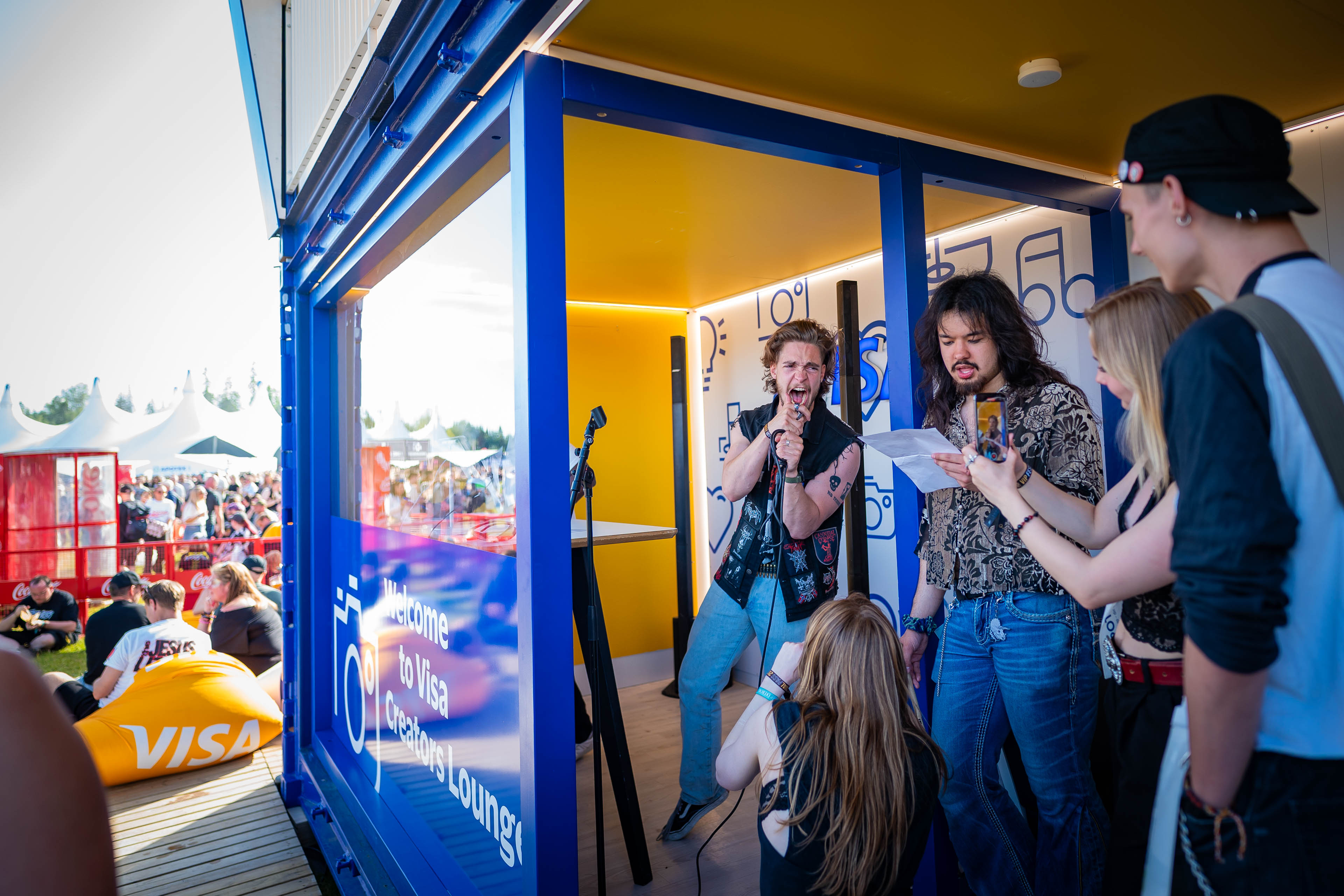
The festival’s partners offer various activities — shown here is the karaoke box of one of them.

== Lineup ==
The following bands have played, or are announced to play, at Tons of Rock:

Year	Band	Source
2014	Volbeat, Slayer, W.A.S.P., Anthrax, Ghost, Sabaton, Kvelertak, Turbonegro, Sepultura, Soilwork, Shining, Oslo Ess, TNT, Valentourettes, Deathcrush, Blaze Bayley, IAmFire, Sahg, Witchhammer, Spirits of the Dead, Black Debbath, Obliteration, Silver, Thulsa Doom, In Solitude, Year of the Goat, One Tail, One Head, Alfahanne, Reptilian, Backstreet Girls, Jorn, Kampfar, Audrey Horne, Avatarium, Purson, Vanderduyst, Reckless Love, Devil, Slegest, Saffire, Bloodlights, Uncle Acid & the Deadbeats, Heatseekers, Warp Riders, Rundown	
2015	In Flames, Twisted Sister, Opeth, Testament, Venom, Seigmen, Backyard Babies, Gojira, Kreator, Parkway Drive, DumDum Boys, Solstafir, Black Debbath, Mayhem, Dunderbeist, Ihsahn, Graveyard, Artch, Eluveite, Alcest, Bömbers, Nifelheim, Aura Noir, Pagan's Mind, Studfaust, Niterain, Supernova Downtown, Enforcer, Fleshgod Apocalypse, Tribulation, The Good the Bad and the Zugly, Triosphere, Planet Mastergod, Rammsund	
2016	Black Sabbath (farewell tour), Alice Cooper, Megadeth, Europe, Ghost, Vreid, Rival Sons, Behemoth, Sixx:A.M., Amon Amarth, Raga Rockers, Converge, Pain, Blues Pills, August Burns Red, Insomnium, Leprous, Black Debbath, Red Harvest, El Caco, Nekromantheon, The Dogs, Mannskoret, MGLA, The Carburetors, Havok, Pil & Bue, Hedvig Mollestad Trio, Heatseekers, Buzzdrivers, The Shrine, Krakow, Mork, Ammunition, Västerbron, Steak Number Eight, Ethereal Sin, Below, Bodies, Eurotrash, Lucky Malice, Vaya Con Satan, Blodstrupmoen, Les Punx, Freedumb, Tormods Orgelkvartett (cancelled)), Dr. Joe & the Fusion Clinic	
2017	Five Finger Death Punch, Slayer, Rob Zombie, Blink-182 (cancelled), Sabaton, Emperor, Turbonegro, TNT, Devin Townsend Project, Phil Campbell and the Bastard Sons, Satyricon, Airbourne, Eluveitie, Marky Ramone, Spidergawd, Enslaved, Black Star Riders, Rotting Christ, Candlemass, Entombed A.D., Diamond Head, Black Debbath, Sodom, Amaranthe, Myrkur, Bölzer, Honningbarna, Anekdoten, Bombus, Avatar, Chain Home, Me and that man, Valentourettes, Swing of Death, Deathhammer, Aiming for Enrike, Black Magic, Ondt Blod, Divided Multitude, Invaders, Taake, Vazelina Bilopphøggers, Delain, Horisont (band), Virus, Beaten to Death, Sibiir (cancelled), Dreamarcher, Føss (cancelled), Wildnite	
2018	Ozzy Osbourne, Alice in Chains, Helloween, Arch Enemy, W.A.S.P., Opeth, Abbath, Wardruna, Kvelertak, Exodus, Alestorm, Gåte, Soulfly, At the Gates, Audrey Horne, Epica, Equinox, Skambankt, Coven (band), Gaahls Wyrd, Witchcraft, Gothminister, Føss, Girlschool, Battle Beast, Whoredom Rife, In Vain, Imperial State Electric, Ragnarok, Carach Angren, Black Debbath, Malignant Eternal, Sibiir, Tusmørke, Skeletonwitch, The Good The Bad and The Zugly, Lüt, Mantar	
2019	Kiss, Volbeat, Def Leppard, Dropkick Murphys, Slayer, In Flames, Behemoth, Satyricon, Wolfmother, Raga Rockers, Dream Theater, Gluecifer, Ulver, Amaranthe, Black Debbath, Djerv, While She Sleeps, Perpurator, Heave Blood and Die, Mayhem, Tesseract, Conception, Possessed, Bury Tomorrow, Vreid, Vltimas, The Hu, Hällas, Testament, Powerwolf, HEX A.D., Oslo Ess, The Dogs, Carcass, Circus Maximus, Kalmah, Inglorious, Obliteration, Black Viper	
2020 (cancelled)	Iron Maiden, Faith No More, Deep Purple, Disturbed, Alter Bridge, Gojira, Bring Me the Horizon, Dimmu Borgir, Airbourne, Within Temptation, Amon Amarth, Mastodon, Baroness, Enslaved, Black Debbath, Hypocrisy, Steel Panther, Seigmen, CC Cowboys, D-A-D, Sepultura, HammerFall, Accept, Ricochets, Wig Wam, Paradise Lost, Ensiferum, Backstreet Girls, Joyous Wolf, The Raven Age, Tempt, British Lion, The Pretty Reckless, Dark Funeral, Jinjer, Bokassa, Spidergawd (with Jørn Lande), Dirty Honey, Raised Fist, 1349, Blues Pills	
2021 (cancelled)	Scorpions, Faith No More, Deep Purple, Mastodon, Europe, Devin Townsend, Sum 41, Bring Me the Horizon, Dimmu Borgir, Steel Panther, Puscifer, Within Temptation, Amon Amarth, Gojira, Opeth, Baroness, Black Debbath, Enslaved, Death to All, Hypocrisy, Joyous Wolf, Raised Fist, Fire from the Gods, Spiritbox, Backstreet Girls, Seigmen, CC Cowboys, Ricochets, D-A-D, Sepultura, The Pretty Reckless, HammerFall, Spidergawd, Dark Funeral, Jinjer, Bokassa, Accept, Wig Wam, Turbonegro, Kampfar, Paradise Lost, Ensiferum, White Reaper, Hjelvik, 1349, Blues Pills	
2022	Iron Maiden, Faith No More (cancelled), Korn, Bring Me the Horizon, Deep Purple, Five Finger Death Punch, Europe, Mastodon, Sum 41, The Darkness, Dimmu Borgir, Steel Panther, Opeth, Turbonegro, Within Temptation, Baroness, Black Debbath, Bullet for My Valentine, Death to All, Enslaved, Fire from the Gods, Hjelvik, Hypocrisy, Raised Fist, Spidergawd, Spiritbox (cancelled), Accept, Backstreet Girls, CC Cowboys, D-A-D, Dark Funeral, Jinjer, Katatonia, Måneskin (cancelled), Seigmen cancelled), Sepultura, Tribulation, Abbath, Blues Pills (cancelled), Bokassa, Ensiferum, Joyous Wolf (cancelled), Kampfar, Nestor, Orbit Culture, Paradise Lost, Ricochets, Vemod, Wig Wam, 1349, Fixation	
2023	Guns N’ Roses, Volbeat, Nightwish (cancelled), Madrugada, Ghost, Pantera, Iggy Pop, Kvelertak, Generation Sex, Skid Row, Airbourne, Behemoth, Clutch, Powerwolf, Architects, Gojira, TNT, Wardruna, In Flames, Puscifer, At the Gates, Black Debbath, Carpenter Brut, Dead Poet Society, Municipal Waste, Sator, Sleep Token (cancelled), Smash Into Pieces, Spiritworld, Asking Alexandria, Avatar, Fever 333, The Good The Bad and The Zugly, Halestorm, Mayhem, Soulfly, Storm, Voivod, Audrey Horne, Brenn., The Bronx, Death By Unga Bunga, Napalm Death, Spiritbox, Vreid, Witch Club Satan, Aura Noir, Bury Tomorrow, Candlemass, The Dogs, HammerFall, Honningbarna, Magna Carta Cartel, Stage Dolls	
2024	Metallica, Tool, Judas Priest, Greta Van Fleet, Parkway Drive, Motorpsycho, Black Debbath, While She Sleeps, Rotting Christ, Better Lovers, Opeth, Oslo Ess, Thy Art Is Murder, Abbath, Orange Goblin, Satyricon, Seigmen, Igorrr, Thundermother, ZZ Top, Saxon, Europe, Extreme, Avantasia, Kreator, Gluecifer, Heart, Mr. Bungle, Turnstile, Uriah Heep, Alien Weaponry, All Them Witches, Asinhell, Batushka,Cavalera Conspiracy, Doro, Einherjer, Empire State Bastard, I Am Morbid, Katatonia, Mammoth WVH, Span, Go-Go Gorilla, SKYND, Health, Nervosa, Night Verses, Palaye Royale, Valentourettes, Tsjuder,Twin Temple, Pil & Bue, Sklitakling	
2025	Muse, Green Day, Kaizers Orchestra, Avenged Sevenfold, Megadeth, Dimmu Borgir, Sex Pistols (with Frank Carter), Dream Theater, Meshuggah, Within Temptation, Machine Head, Weezer, Black Debbath, Turbonegro, Orbit Culture, Poppy, Tarja, Candlemass, Djerv, Deafheaven, Bad Nerves, Dark Angel, Moillrock, Whitechapel, Landmvrks, Bleed from Within, Dead Poet Society, Electric Callboy, Lorna Shore, Alestorm, Emperor, Jinjer, Kim Dracula, Old Man's Child, Powerwolf, The Good The Bad and The Zugly, Arachno, Cocktail Slippers, Drakånis, Eternal Evil, Fixation, Stargazer, The Clumps, Backstreet Girls honour Müller, Nidhög, Jerry Cantrell, Steel Panther, The Damned, Myles Kennedy, Carcass, Ugly Kid Joe, The Sword, Belphegor, Finntroll, Kat von D, Slomosa, Bastardane, Fit for an Autopsy, The Cruel Intentions, Exodus, Hurra Torpedo, Sleggefett	
2026	Bring Me the Horizon, The Offspring, Iron Maiden, Yungblud (cancelled, replaced by Joan Jett and The Blackhearts), Limp Bizkit, Babymetal, DumDum Boys, Blood Fire Death – a tribute to Bathory, Blood Incantation, Cavalera Conspiracy, The Carburetors, Alice Cooper, Anthrax, D-A-D, Apocalyptica, Audrey Horne, Tom Morello (cancelled, replaced by The Hellacopters), Raga Rockers, Mayhem, Elder, Kublai Khan TX, The Pretty Reckless (cancelled, replaced by Avatar), Queensrÿche, Twisted Sister (cancelled), A Perfect Circle, Black Label Society, Death To All, Die Spitz, Gatecreeper, Gaerea, The Hives, Sepultura, Leprous, Dogstar, Black Debbath, Imminence, The Warning, Paleface Swiss, The Baboon Show, Slay Squad, Ego Kill Talent, Trivium, Suicidal Tendencies, DDR, Eivør, Pain, President, Grandson, Storm, Blood Red Throne, Yonaka, The Funeral Portrait, Angell, Baphy, Høst, Jordsjuk, Koko Franco, Possessed, Rival Sons, W.A.S.P. (cancelled, replaced by Accept), Turdus Musicus, You Know Who, Behemoth	
