= Rockheim =

Norwegian music museum

Coordinates: 63°26′19″N 010°24′3″E

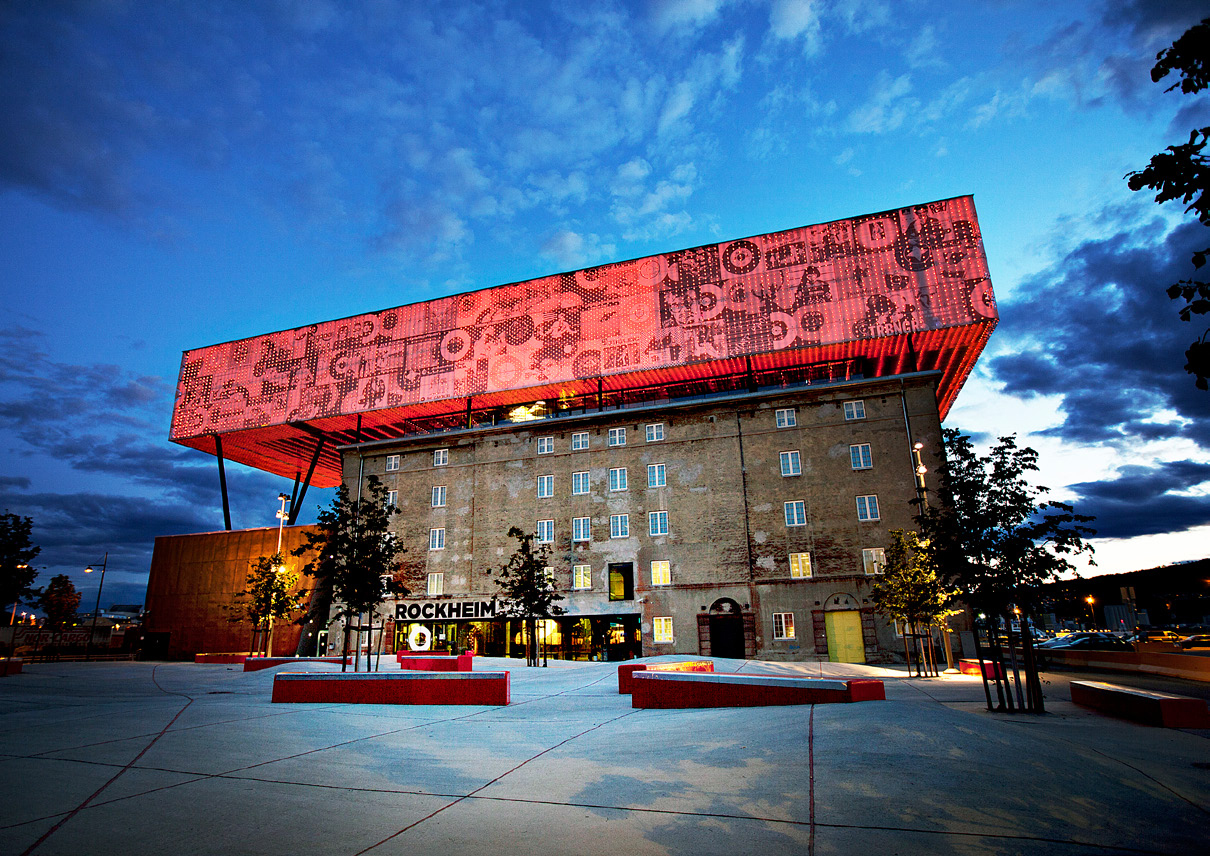
Rockheim, photographed in 2011

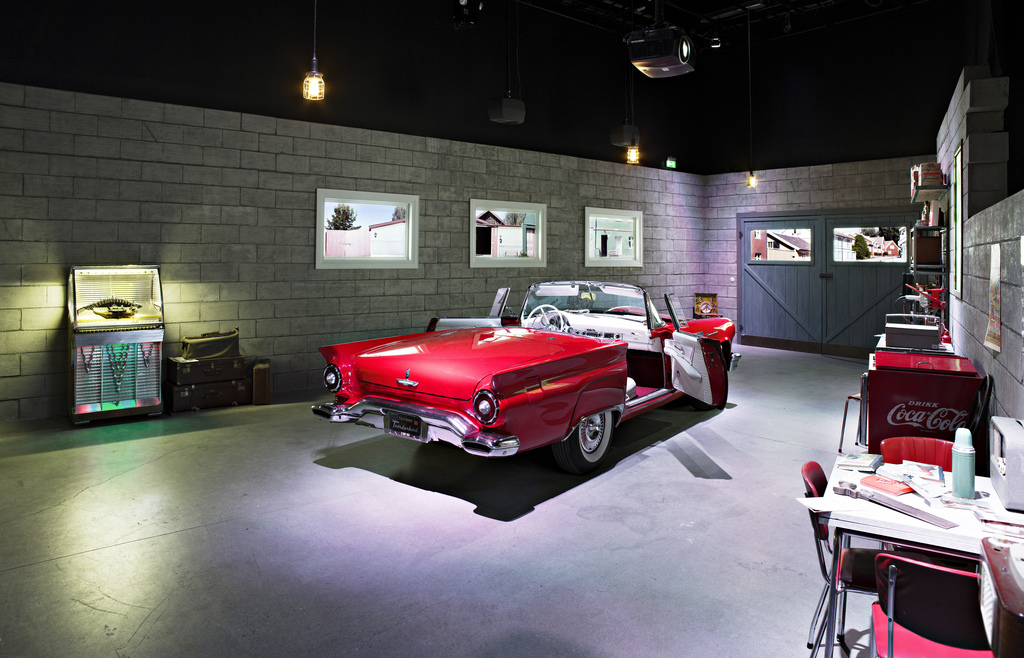
The 1950s room in the permanent exhibit features a Ford Thunderbird.

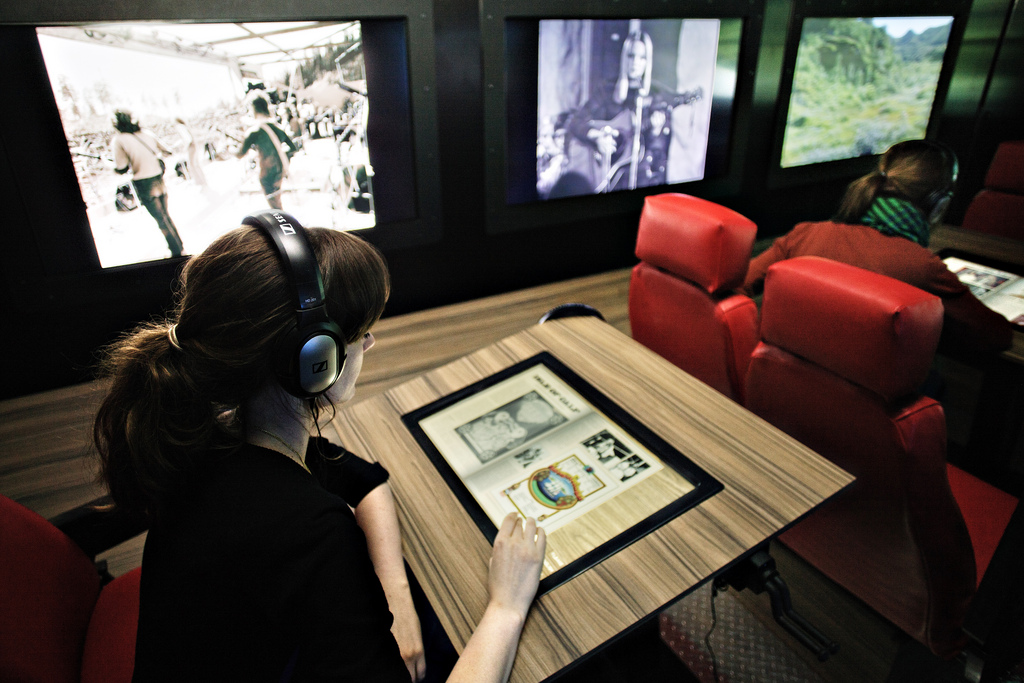
In the 1970s room, a tour bus has magazine readers embedded between the seats.

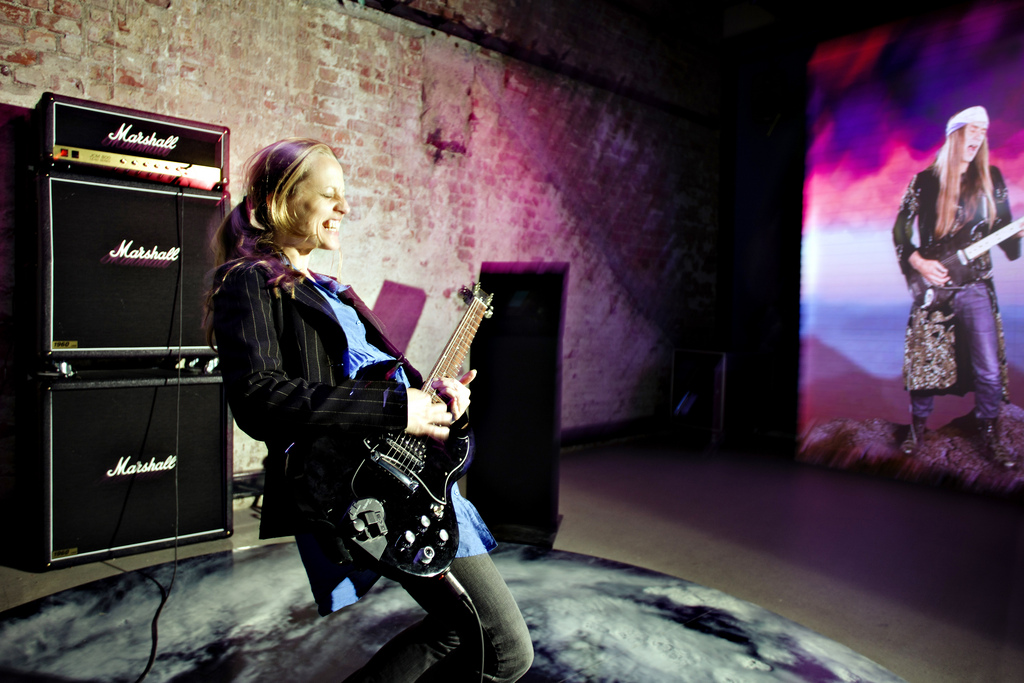
The Ronni Room, where visitors can try playing rock guitar

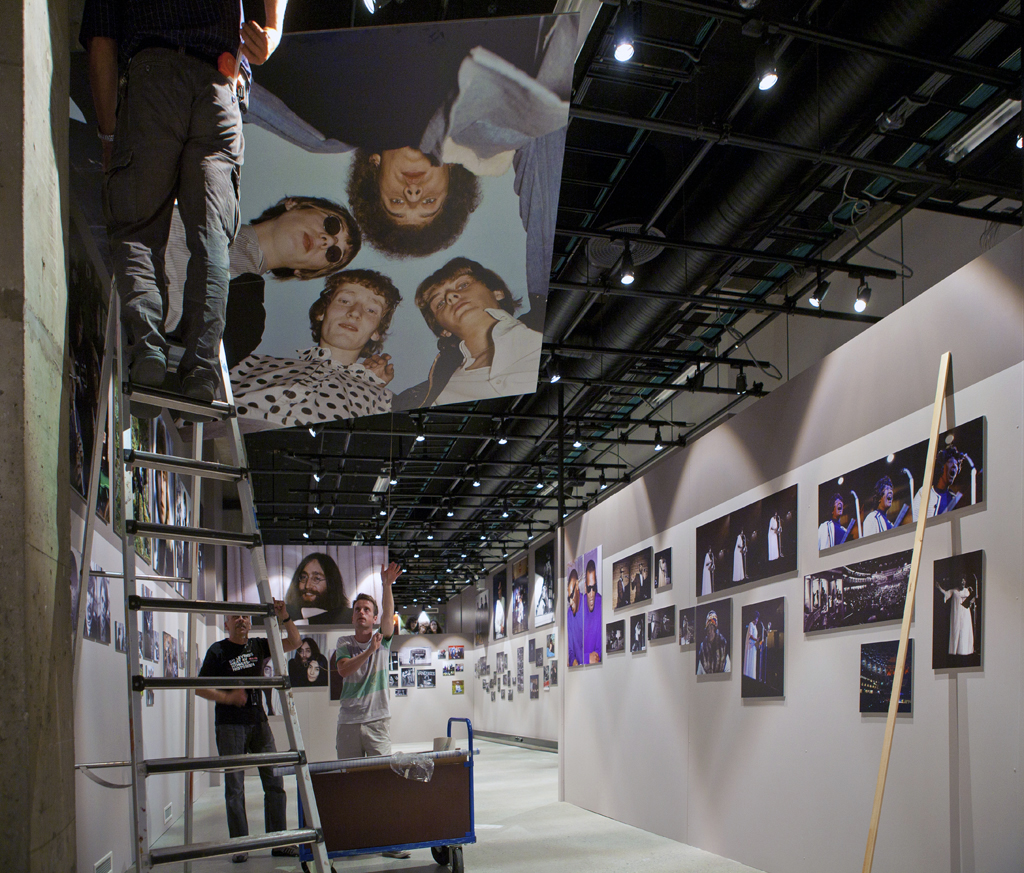
Mounting Robert Meyer's portrait of The Pussycats for the opening exhibition

Rockheim (also called Det nasjonale opplevelsessenteret for pop og rock, The National Discovery Centre for Pop and Rock, and Det nasjonale museet for populærmusikk, The National Museum for Popular Music) is Norway's national museum for popular music from the 1950s to the present. It is a division of Museene i Sør-Trøndelag (Sør-Trøndelag Museums) and is housed in a former grain warehouse in Trondheim. It opened in 2010; since 2013, the director has been Sissel Guttormsen. The museum also has a virtual presence, Virtuelle Rockheim, which launched in 2009, and since 2011 musicians and groups have been chosen for the Rockheim Hall of Fame.

== History and administration ==
The idea for the museum goes back to 1998; the Ministry of Culture began planning eight years later and in 2007 Bratterøkaia AS won the commission to create it. It was to have opened in 2009, but completion of the building was delayed by a contractor bankruptcy and a fire. It officially opened on 5 August 2010.

Rockheim is housed in a 1919 grain warehouse in Trondheim. To roughly double the space available, a new sixth floor was added in the form of a cantilevered 'box', which is clad in glass decorated with reproductions of album covers and with changeable back-lighting provided by 13,000 individually controllable LEDs; the public can affect the colours by using cellphones. A "black box" building for performances was also added; the design envisaged this being covered by climbing plants. The architects for the conversion were Pir II and for the grounds, Agraff AS. The conversion was awarded the City of Trondheim's 2010 building award. The building has 400 square metres (4,300 sq ft) of floor space, of which half is exhibit space. The building and installations cost 300 million kroner.

The museum is a division of Museene i Sør-Trøndelag. It was headed by Arvid Esperø during planning and construction and until 2011, when Petter Myhr became the director; he was succeeded in 2013 by Sissel Guttormsen.

== Permanent and virtual exhibits ==
The primary mission of the museum is to preserve and document Norwegian popular music. The permanent exhibit, for which the lead designer was Canadian Stacey Spiegel, takes the form of a journey through Norwegian music and cultural history from the 1950s to the present. It occupies 320 square metres (3,400 sq ft) in the building's top-floor box, and devotes a room to each decade. The exhibition has many interactive components. Visitors first encounter an interactive map of Norway, can select the videos shown in each room, and there are three discovery rooms: in the Ronni Room they can try playing guitar with guidance from Ronni Le Tekrø, and in the Hiphop Room they can experiment with DJing, graffiti art and breakdancing. In Virtuelle Rockheim, launched on 21 August 2009, they can manipulate an avatar to explore a selection of the exhibits in 3D. Spiegel, who also designed the virtual museum, predicted in 2008 that Rockheim would be "the world's most technically sophisticated virtual museum"; it was Norway's first online museum.

== Temporary exhibitions ==
The museum opened with a temporary exhibition of photographs by Robert Meyer titled Icons of the 60's. Other temporary exhibitions have been Jukeboks! (jukebox), Wenches Verden (on Wenche Myhre), Innenfor/utenfor (inside/outside; photographs by Peter Beste) and Teigens Tivoli (on Jahn Teigen).

== Hall of Fame ==
The Rockheim Hall of Fame honours individuals and groups for their contributions to Norwegian popular music. Inductees must have debuted at least 25 years before and are chosen annually by a jury. a-ha, Åge Aleksandersen, Jokke & Valentinerne, Wenche Myhre and Alf Prøysen were the first to be inducted, on 5 September 2011.

=== Inductees by Year ===
Year	Artist
2011	Åge Aleksandersen
2011	Wenche Myhre
2011	Jokke & Valentinerne
2011	a-ha
2011	Alf Prøysen
2012	DumDum Boys
2012	The Pussycats
2012	Jan Eggum
2012	Jahn Teigen
2012	Terje Rypdal
2013	Lillebjørn Nilsen
2013	Nora Brockstedt
2013	Anne Grete Preus
2014	Knutsen & Ludvigsen
2014	deLillos
2014	Øystein Sunde
2015	Inger Lise Rypdal
2015	Jan Garbarek
2015	Mari Boine
2015	Ole Paus
2016	Svein Finjarn
2016	Karin Krog
2016	Motorpsycho
2017	Raga Rockers
2017	Dizzie Tunes
2017	Popol Ace
2018	Morten Abel
2018	Kari Bremnes
2018	Stage Dolls
2019	Finn Kalvik
2019	Anita Skorgan
2019	TNT
2020	Halvdan Sivertsen
2020	Radka Toneff
2020	Jonas Fjeld
2021	Mayhem
2021	Casino Steel
2021	The Monroes
2023	Backstreet Girls
2023	Hellbillies
2023	Sidsel Endresen
2024	Bjørn Eidsvåg
2024	Bel Canto
2024	Röyksopp
2025	Madrugada
2025	Åse Kleveland
2025	Turbonegro

== See also ==
- List of music museums
