= Crimson Riders =

Studio album by Bokassa
- Released: 21 June 2019
- Genre: Stoner rock; hardcore punk
- Length: 29:35
- Label: MVKA; Nuclear Blast

Bokassa chronology
Divide & Conquer (2017)	Crimson Riders (2019)	Molotov Rocktail (2021)

Singles from Crimson Riders
- 1. "Mouthbreathers Inc." Released: 18 April 2019; 2. "Captain Cold One" Released: 25 May 2019

Crimson Riders is the second studio album by Norwegian rock band Bokassa. The album was released on 21 June 2019 through Kings of Stonerpunk and MVKA.

== Track listing ==
No.	Title	Length
1.	"Brologue"	1:30
2.	"Charmed & Extremely Treacherous"	2:56
3.	"Vultures"	2:45
4.	"Mouthbreathers, Inc."	3:06
5.	"Wrath Is Love"	4:16
6.	"Crimson Riders"	2:02
7.	"Captain Cold One"	3:06
8.	"Blunt Force Karma"	2:45
9.	"Immortal Space Pirate 2: The Last Shredi"	6:59
Total length:		29:35

== Critical reception ==
Professional ratings
Aggregate scores
Source	Rating
Album of the Year	80/100
Review scores
Source	Rating
Already Heard	3.5/5 stars
Distorted Sound	10/10
Kerrang!	4/5 stars
Rock N' Load	9/10
Rock Sins	7/10
Tuonela	Mixed

Crimson Riders was well received by contemporary music critics. On review aggregator website, Album of the Year, Crimson Riders enjoys an average rating of 80 out of 100, indicated very positive reviews. In a positive review, Sam Law of Kerrang! said that on Crimson Riders "eight full tracks unfold flab-free, powered by raw riffs across a backdrop of good times, hard knocks, spent fag-ends, broken bottles and grimy camaraderie". Law ultimately gave Crimson Riders four stars out of five.

Jack Fermor-Worrell, writing for Distorted Sound Magazine gave the album a perfect 10 out of 10 score, praising Crimson Riders as a strong follow-up that shows the ambition of the band going forward, referencing their tour with Metallica. Fermor-Worrell said that the album is "a monumental step-up in quality from an already promising band, putting forward a concise yet entirely enjoyable collection of huge, arena-ready anthems to which BOKASSA can easily nail their colours in the biggest of live environments for the foreseeable future. Not a single moment here feels unnecessary or overly-drawn-out, and considering the relative youth of the band’s career, the level of song-craft and sheer willingness to experiment that’s on display here is genuinely remarkable."

== Charts ==
Chart (2019)	Peak position
Norwegian Albums (VG-lista)	20
