= Oslo Ess =

Norwegian musical group

Oslo Ess is a Norwegian rock/punk band with Åsmund Lande as vocalist/guitarist, Peter Larsson on guitar and Knut-Oscar Nymo on bass. Lande and Larsson used to play in another formation and launched the band. Although Oslo Ess doesn't have a permanent drummer, a number of drummers have played with the band including Håvard Takle Ohr, Steffen Skau Linnert, Tommy Akerholdt, Kim Akerholdt and Mads Golden.

The band released their debut album Uleste bøker og utgåtte sko on Råtass Records on 11 March 2011. The album reached #9 on Norwegian Albums Chart. This was followed up in 2012 with a new album Verden på nakken, venner i ryggen that hit #4 on the Albums chart in its first week of release. Their most successful single has been "Caroline". The band's lyrics are mostly about partying and nightlife, reflecting partly Jokke and Raga Rockers, but in a contemporary style of the 2010s.

Oslo Ess were nominated for "best rock group" category in the 2011 Spellemann awards. They also performed to a sold-out crowd on 21 December 2011 and 6 October in the Rockefeller. In 2013 they contributed to the book "Think like a rockstar" Tenk som en rockestjerne, written by Ståle Økland.

== Discography ==
=== Studio albums ===
| Year | Album | Chart peak |
| Year | Album | NOR |
|---|---|---|
| 2011 | Uleste bøker og utgåtte sko | 9 |
| 2012 | Verden på nakken, venner i ryggen | 1 |
| 2014 | Alle hjerter deler seg | 1 |
| 2016 | Konge uten ei krone | 5 |
| 2018 | Frie radikaler | 29 |
| 2021 | Pønk, rock og harde kår | 8 |
| 2023 | Oslo Ess | 7 |

=== Live albums ===
| Year | Album | Chart peak |
| Year | Album | NOR |
|---|---|---|
| 2013 | #199 Live Akustisk Fra Rockefeller | 6 |
| 2018 | Det blir bra når det kommer folk (Live Akustisk) | — |
