= Rock music in Norway =

Norwegian musical scene

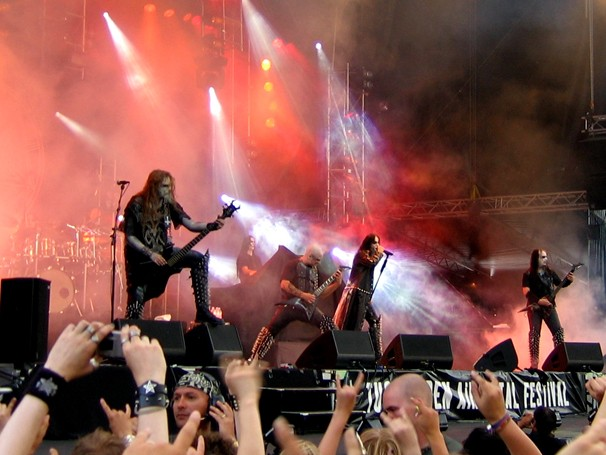
Dimmu Borgir performing at Tuska in 2005.

Rock music arrived in Norway following the rock'n'roll musical revolution in the US and Great Britain in the late 1950s. Norwegian rock quickly fostered capable musicians, but was strongly influenced by the Anglo-American starting point for the musical form. The leading Norwegian rock groups in the 1960s and 1970s largely expressed themselves in English, while Norwegian was long only used in the more traditional hit and pop music. Notable Norwegian rock bands include Titanic, a-ha, and Kaizers Orchestra.

== 1950s and 1960s ==
The most known rock and roll performers in the 1950s were Per Granberg, Per Hartvig (Rocke-Pelle), Jan Rohde and Odd Gisløy (Smiling Tommy). Gisløy even penned his own rock and roll composition: "Dancing with My Rockin' Shoes".

In the early 1960s the so-called Shadow bands (named after the British instrumental group The Shadows) were popular. Among the most notable were The Beatniks and The Vanguards. In the mid-1960s The Pussycats recorded two albums: one in Great Britain and one in West Germany, both produced by Sven-Erik Børja. Most of the songs were composed by group member Trond Graff.

== 1970s and 1980s ==
Titanic reached # 5 on the UK singles chart in 1971. Norway also has a notable progressive rock scene, which began in 1971 with the release of Junipher Greene's Friendship, the country's first double album.

Beginning in the mid-1970s it slowly became more acceptable to sing in Norwegian. One of the foremost pioneers of rock in Norwegian was the "trønder rocker" Åge Aleksandersen. This movement was also combined with experimentation in combining elements from folk and old dance music into rock. More progressive bands like Folque incorporated elements of traditional Norwegian folk music in their recordings. Other bands include Ruphus, Aunt Mary and Høst. This scene was in large part fueled by the success Frank Zappa had in Norway.

On July 20, 1977, the Sex Pistols played a concert at the Penguin Club in Oslo; they also played in Trondheim that month. These shows brought punk to Norway, inspiring a Norwegian punk rock scene. The first Norwegian punk bands make their record debuts during 1979. In the punk scene it is not clear which band released the first Norwegian punk single release; the top candidates are Pink Dirt, Graxelaget, Front Page, Kjøtt, Oslo Børs, and Børres Kork. Trygve Mathiesen concludes that it was Børres Kork whose single had the earliest release date. In 1982 the Blitz-huset in Oslo was established, and that remained a center of the punk scene throughout the 1980s. There was also a punk milieu in Trondheim associated with the Hard Rock Kafé, which produced bands like Wannskrækk and Liliedugg. Punk continues to have an active scene in Norway, centered around the Blitz in Oslo and the UFFA house in Trondheim. Other cities including Bergen, Stavanger, Bodø, and Tromsø have also had smaller but active scenes. Bands such as Raga Rockers, DumDum Boys, Honningbarna, and Kvelertak have clear influences from the punk scene.

In the 80s Norway had A-Ha, Artch, Return, Stage Dolls and TNT, the first Norwegian band to be featured on the American Billboard charts. In the latter years of this decade a new generation of bands started to gain popularity. These were bands who sang in Norwegian. Here Norway got the "4 great ones": DumDum Boys, DeLillos, Raga Rockers and Jokke & Valentinerne. All these bands except Jokke (Joachim "Jokke" Nielsen died in 2000) are still active.

== Since 1990 ==
More recently, the Norwegian rock-scene has been dominated internationally by bands such as Turbonegro, Gluecifer and Madrugada, but several bands (like BigBang, Euroboys and Span) concentrate on the domestic market. The Stavanger hard rock band Kvelertak has been touring around the world with Purified in Blood among others since the release of their self-titled debut album in 2010.

In the mid-1980s & early 1990s, Norway saw the growing of the underground black metal scene, which eventually became the Early Norwegian black metal scene with bands including Mayhem, Immortal, Enslaved, Darkthrone, Burzum, Gorgoroth, Satyricon, Solefald, and Dimmu Borgir. Industrial rock band Zeromancer was formed in 1999. A few members were formerly in the band Seigmen.

Since 2001, Kaizers Orchestra has been among the most important rock bands in Norway. The band employs a variety of unusual instruments including a pump organ and an accordion. They are known for their use of oil barrels, car wheels, and garbage cans as percussion instruments.

== Literature ==
- Trygve Mathisen. Tre grep og sannheten - Norsk punk 1977-1980. Vega forlag 2007. ISBN 9788282115445 (republished 2017).
- Trygve Mathisen. Norsk postpunk 1980-1985 - Fra hardcore til A-ha. Vega forlag 2011. ISBN 9788282112055.
