= Tuonela (disambiguation) =

Tuonela is the underworld and realm of the dead in Finnish mythology

Tuonela may refer to:

- Tuonela Planitia, a cryovolcanic feature on Triton
- Tuonela (album), a music album by the Finnish band Amorphis
- Tuonela Productions, a Finland-based game development and publishing company
- The Swan of Tuonela, a tone poem by Finnish composer Jean Sibelius
