= Backstreet Girls =

Norwegian rock band

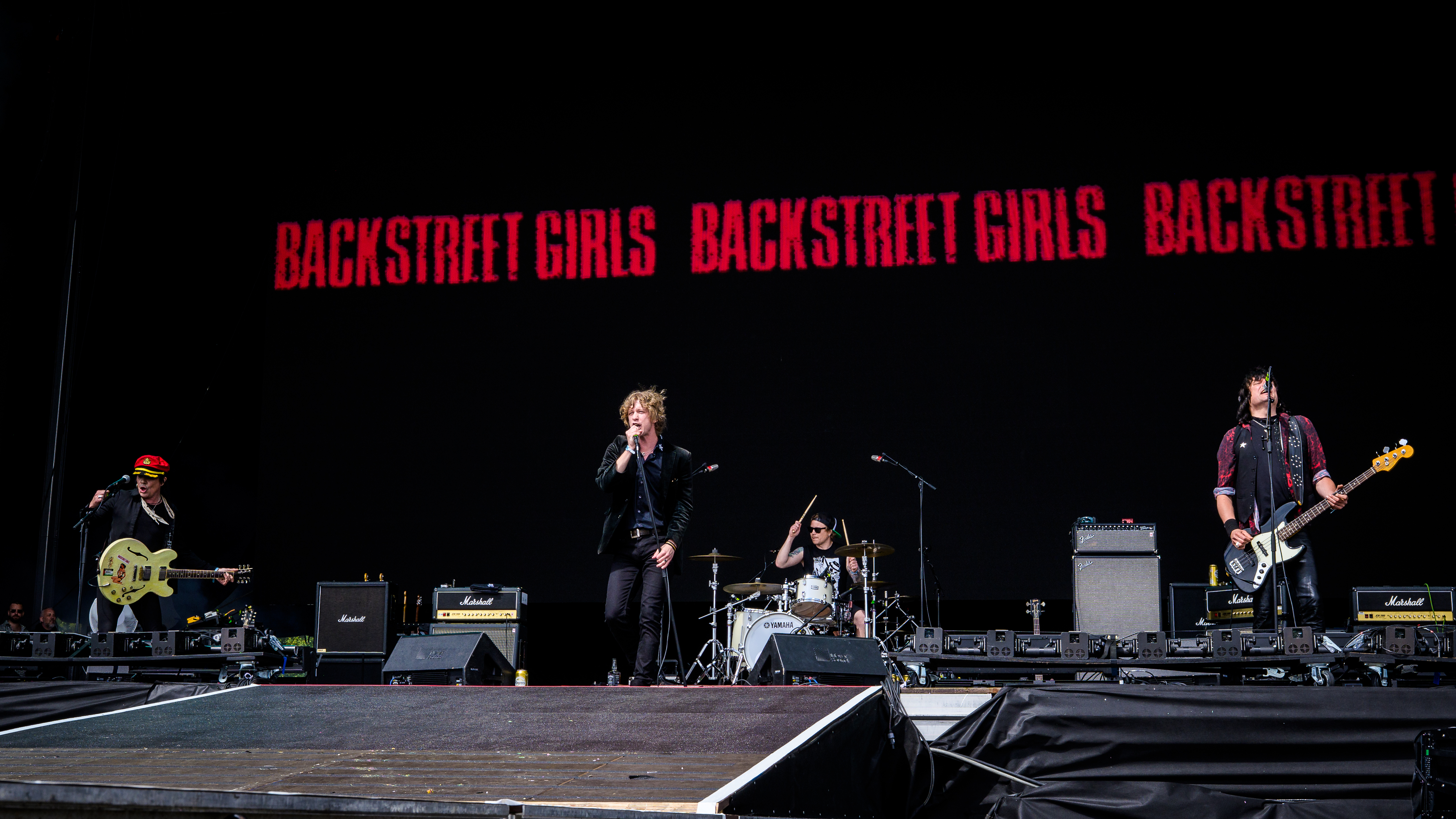
- Backstreet Girls performing at Tons of Rock in 2025.

Background information
- Origin: Oslo, Norway
- Genres: Boogie rock, punk rock, hard rock, rock n' roll
- Years active: 1984–present
- Label: Voices of Wonder · Mercury · Vertigo Records · WEA · FaceFront · Revolution Records
- Members: Roar Leren; Petter Baarli; Gaute Vaag; Jonas Kjærnsrød
- Past members: Full list
- Website: https://backstreetgirls.no/

Backstreet Girls are a Norwegian rock band formed in 1984. The band's current lineup consists of vocalist Roar Leren, guitarist Petter Baarli, bassist Gaute Vaag and drummer Jonas Kjærnsrød. Backstreet Girls have released sixteen studio albums since the band's formation.

== History ==
Backstreet Girls was formed in 1984 by brothers Pål and Tom Kristensen on bass and vocals respectively, guitarist Petter Baarli and drummer Petter Hafstad. Hafstad left the band in September of that year and was replaced by Baarli's brother Bjørn Terje Baarli, while Tom Kristensen left the band in 1985 and was replaced by Arne Aarnes. Later that year, the band started writing and recording their first album, and also contributed to the soundtrack of the Norwegian film X. In 1986, Backstreet Girls released their debut album Mental Shakedown on the small independent label Medicine Records. Later that year, Aarnes left the band, and was replaced by Bjørn Müller. The line-up of Petter Baarli, Pål Kristensen, Bjørn Terje Baarli and Bjørn Müller remained for the subsequent three albums, Boogie Till' You Puke (1988), Party On Elmstreet (1989) and Coming Down Hard (1989).

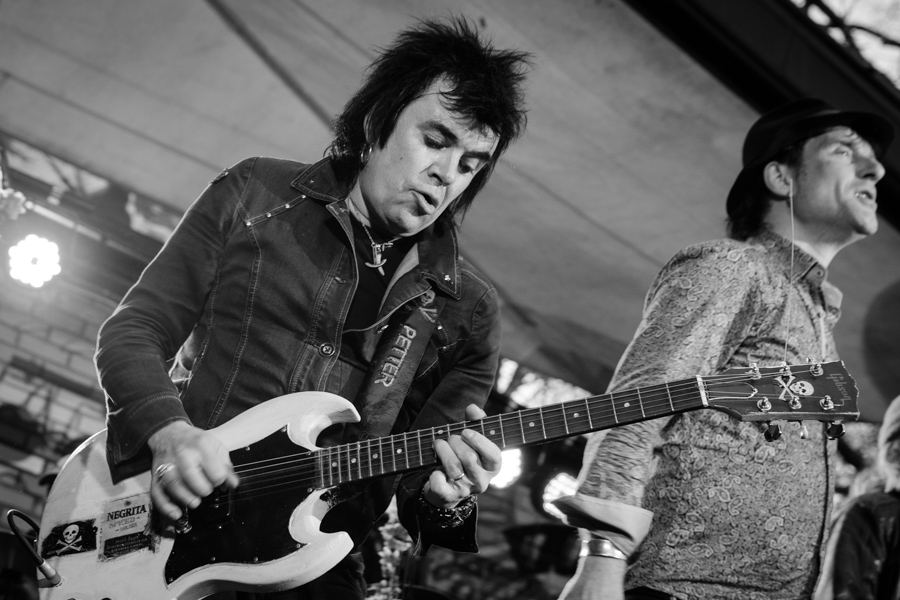
Guitarist Petter Baarli performing in 2018.

In May 1991, Müller left the band, and was replaced by the band's fourth vocalist, Ole Hillborg. The band's next album, Let's Have It, was released in October 1992 on Warner Music. In 1993, the band released their first live album, while Hillborg left the band shortly thereafter. Backstreet Girls traveled to London to audition new singers, eventually recruiting Irishman Pat Diamond, and returned to Norway to record a new album. The album Don't Fake It Too Long was finalized in 1995, but not released until 2008 due to Diamond being deported from Norway. Upon returning to Norway, Diamond was fired and Bjørn Müller rejoined the band as lead vocalist in 1995. Backstreet Girls' next album, Hellway To High, was released in 1999. In October of that year, founding member and bassist Kristensen left the band and was replaced by Morten Lunde. In November 2000, Universal Records released the band's first compilation album, Boogie Till' You Bleed.

In March 2001, the band released their eight studio album, Tuff Tuff Tuff, and went on a summer tour of Europe with long-time influence Rose Tattoo. Live recordings from these concerts along, with new studio songsm were released in September 2002 on the album Black Boogie Death Rock N' Roll. Towards the end of that year, bassist Lunde left the band and was replaced by Dan Thunderbird. In June 2003, the band released the album Sick My Duck. In 2007, drummer Bjørn Terje Baarli left Backstreet Girls after 23 years with the band and was replaced by Swede Martin H-Son. The new lineup of Müller, Baarli, Thunderbird and H-Son would go on to release four studio albums during the next ten years. In 2015, a documentary about the band, Backstreet Girls: Back to Muoatathal, was released. In 2018, H-Son departed the band and was replaced by Frank Albin Tostrup, while Thunderbird left the following year and was replaced by Gaute Vaag. The band's fifteenth album, Normal Is Dangerous, was released in 2019. Drummer Tostrup left the band the following year and was replaced by Jonas Kjærnsrød.

In 2023, the album In Lust We Trust was released. The same year, the band were one of three artists to be inducted into the Rockheim Hall of Fame.

In 2024, Baarli and Müller received the honorary award of the year at the Musikkforleggerprisen (Norwegian Music Publishers Association’s award). In the jury’s statement, it was noted, among other things: “The guitarist’s razor-sharp riffs and the lyricist’s witty, wordplay-rich texts have given us a catalogue of songs that few other Norwegian bands can match — this is quite simply rock’n’roll of world-class standard.” That same year also saw the release of the book Backstreet Girls – 40 år, written by Frank Surdal and Erland Bekkelund.

On 18 November 2024, frontman Bjørn Müller died at the age of 64.

In 2025, the band was awarded the Rolf Gammleng Award (Veteran Prize) by Fond for utøvende kunstnere (The Fund for Performing Artists).

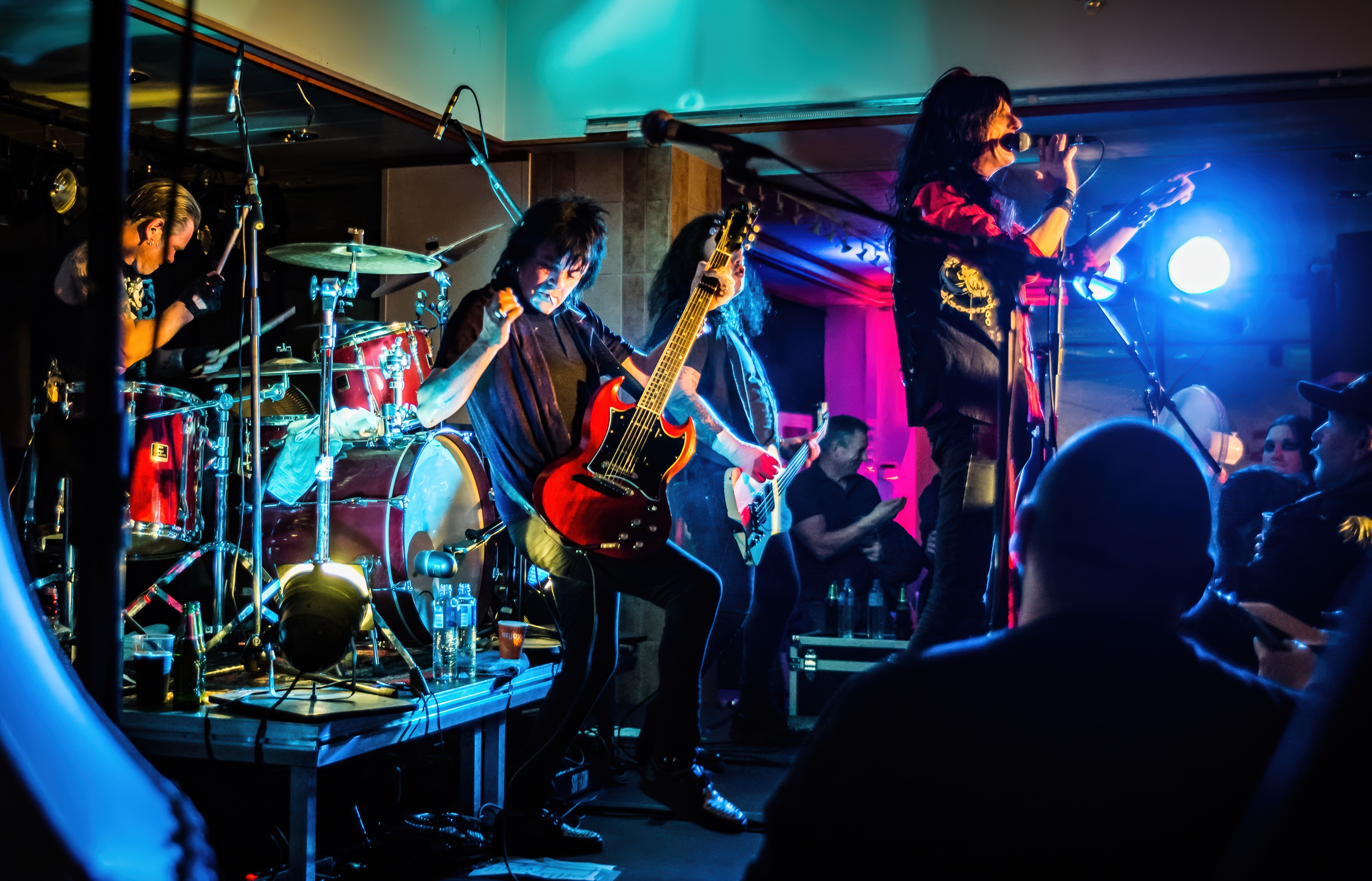
Backstreet Girls performing in 2017

In March 2026, it was announced that Roar Leren was the band’s new vocalist. Leren had been part of the band’s wider circle for several years and had also performed in the Alice Cooper tribute band Dead Babies alongside Müller. He was one of three guest vocalists during the band’s Müller tribute at Tons of Rock 2025. The other two were Tarjei Foshaug and Fredrik Juell.

== Awards and honours ==
- 2025: Rolf Gammleng Award “Veteran Prize (music)”
- 2024: Musikkforleggerprisen “Honorary Award of the Year” to Hans Petter Baarli and Bjørn Müller
- 2023: Inducted into the Rockheim Hall of Fame
- 2019: Normal is Dangerous nominated for the Spellemannprisen 2019 in the rock category
- 1990: Party on Elm Street nominated for the Spellemannprisen 1990 in the rock category
- 1989: Coming Down Hard nominated for the Spellemannprisen 1989 in the rock category

== Members ==
=== Current members ===
- Roar Leren – vocals (2026–present)
- Petter Baarli – guitar (1984–present)
- Gaute Vaag – bass guitar (2019–present)
- Jonas Kjærnsrød – drums (2021–present)

=== Former members ===
- Petter Hafstad – drums (1984)
- Bjørn Terje Baarli – drums (1984–2007)
- Pål Kristensen – bass guitar (1984–1999)
- Tom Kristensen – vocals (1984–1985)
- Stein Ramberg – guitar (1984)
- Jon Berg – guitar (1985)
- Anders Kronberg – vocals (1985)
- Arne Aarnes – vocals (1985–1987)
- Olle Hillborg – vocals (1992–1993)
- Pat Diamond – vocals (1994–1995)
- Morten Lunde – bass guitar (1999–2002)
- Dan Thunderbird (Dan André Raaden Hoque) – bass guitar (2002–2019)
- Martin H-Son (Lars Martin Hansson) – drums (2007–2018)
- Frank Albin Tostrup – drums (2018–2020)
- Bjørn Müller – vocals (1986–1991, 1995–2024; his death)

== Discography ==
=== Studio albums ===
- Mental Shakedown (1986)
- Boogie Till You Puke (1988)
- Party on Elm Street (1989)
- Coming Down Hard (1990)
- Let's Have It (1992)
- Hellway to High (1999)
- Tuff Tuff Tuff (2001)
- Black Boogie Death Rock n' Roll (2002)
- Sick My Duck (2003)
- Shake Your Stimulator (2007)
- Don't Fake It Too Long (2008)
- Just When You Thought Things Couldn't Get Any Worse... Here's the Backstreet Girls (2009)
- Death Before Compromise (2014)
- Don't Mess with My Rock'n'Roll (2017)
- Normal Is Dangerous (2019)
- In Lust We Trust (2023)
- Full Tilt Boogie (2026)

=== Singles ===
- "Gimme Just a Second" (1989)
- "Blame It on Suzie" (1989)
- "Awright, Awright, Awright" (1990)
- "Any Minute Now" (1992)
- "Walking" (1992)
- "Monster in My Cadillac" (1997)
- "Don't Let Me Down (2001)
- "Hey Ho, Let's Quo" (2006)
- "Shine a Line" (2009)

=== Compilations ===
- Boogie Till' You Bleed (2000)

=== Live albums ===
- Live (1993)
- Streaming For Vengecance (2020)
