= Robert Meyer =

Norwegian photographer, professor and historian

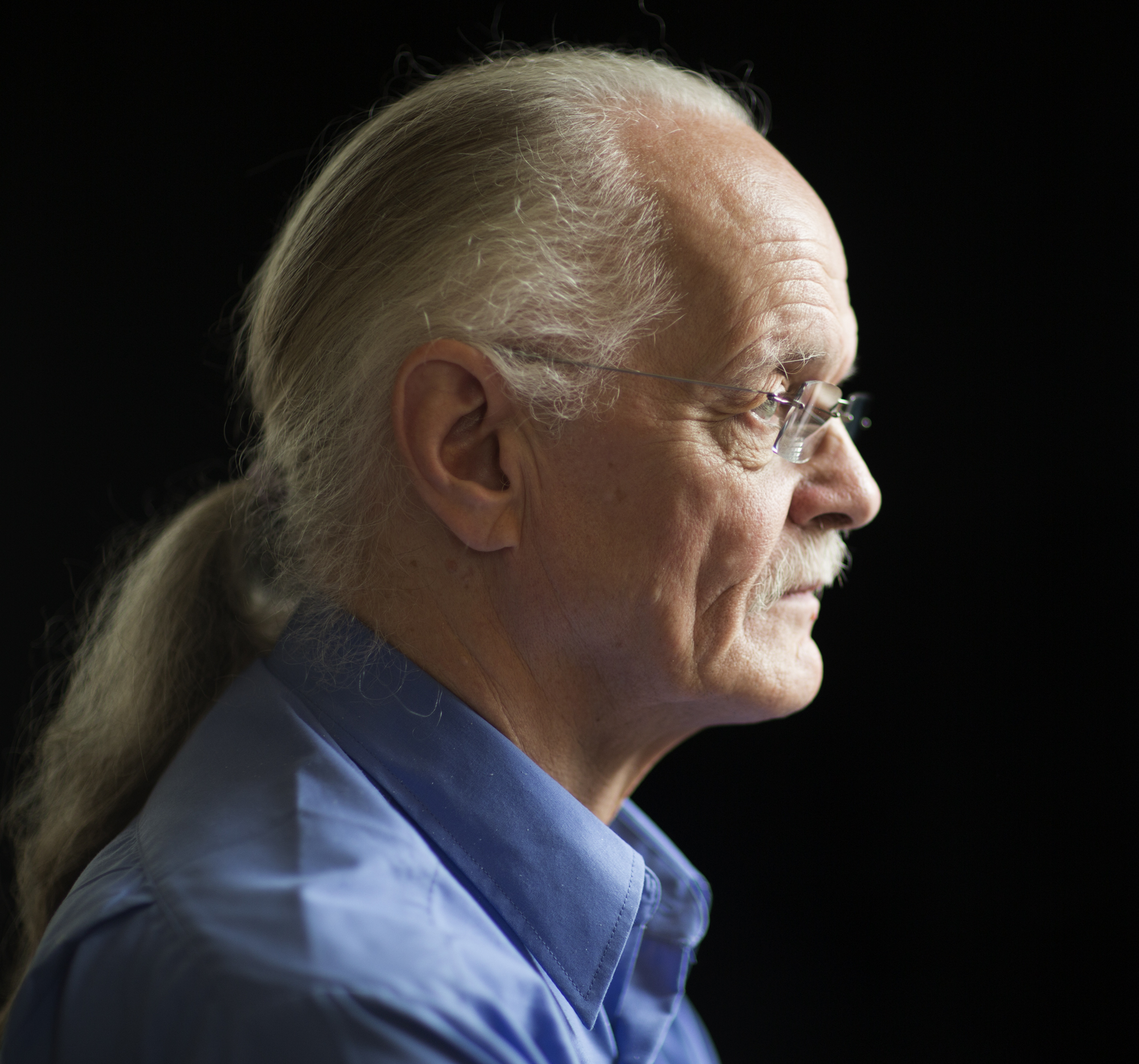
Norwegian photo historian and photographer Robert Meyer

Robert Meyer (born October 2, 1945 in Oslo, Norway) is a Norwegian art photographer, professor, photo historian, collector, writer and publicist. He is the son of journalist Robert Castberg Meyer and homemaker Edel Nielsen; and brother of the industrial designer Terje Meyer.

== Biography ==
In 1963 he became a professional photographer in the Norwegian National Criminal Investigation Service ("Kripos") in Oslo, and as a photojournalist in the newspaper Vårt Land, while freelancing for the weekly press. The year after he moved to Stockholm, where he studied photography under the artist Christer Strömholm at Fotoskolan at the University of Stockholm. Subsequently, he worked five years as a freelancer in Stockholm, Oslo and Buenos Aires. Meyer returned to Oslo in 1967, and from 1971 to 1978 he worked as a photojournalist and editorial member for the Norwegian Broadcasting Corporation's (NRK) magazine. In 1976 he founded the publishing company Ikaros, which produced the Norwegian Photohistorical Journal, a series of books on photography and historically important facsimile editions. The year after he retired his professional photography career to be able to devote his time to research national and international photography history. From 1976 to 1980, he served as a member of Taylor & Francis' consultative council for the history of photography. Later, he worked seven years as an art critic for Norway's leading newspaper, Aftenposten.

Meyer became the first professor of photography in Norway in 1990 at Bergen Academy of Art and Design, where he founded the Institute of Photography. In 1998, he returned to Oslo, starting a private college for photography. He currently resides in Oslo.

=== Professional organizations ===
In 1974, Meyer was the initiator of "Forbundet Frie Fotografer" (The Association of Independent Photographers). Two years later he was also involved in establishing Norsk Fotohistorisk Forening (the Norwegian Photohistorical Society), and in 1979 he became the first chairman of the board of Fotogalleriet (the Norwegian photo gallery Foundation).

=== Exhibitions ===
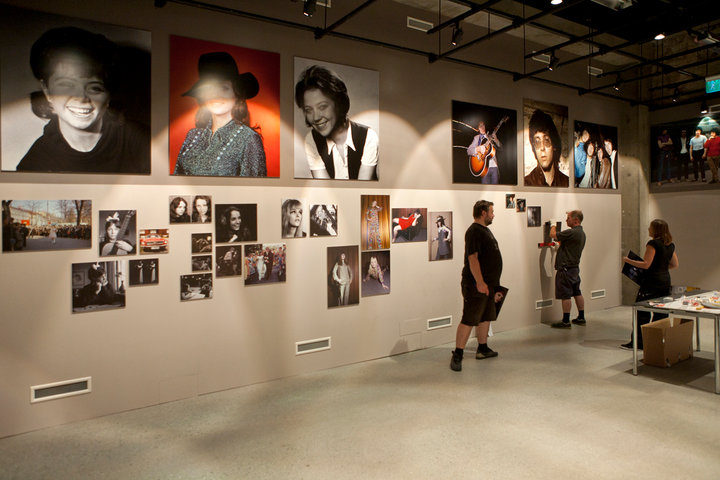
Meyer's exhibition Icons of the 60's being mounted in Rockheim.

His first student exhibition was shown in Stockholm in 1964, although his debut as a photo artist was the exhibition "Lys" ("Light") at Fotogalleriet (the National College of Art and Design) in 1970. Besides numerous solo and group exhibitions in Norway, Meyer also participated in the photography biennale in Gdansk, Poland (1971), and presented a solo exhibition at the Brandts Museum of Photographic Art (Museet for Fotokunst) in Odense, Denmark.

Meyer presented works at two exhibitions in 2002 and 2003 at the Preus Museum (the National Museum of Photography) in Norway.

In the autumn of 2009, Meyer's retrospective exhibition Presence – 50 Years of Photography, which encompassed images taken during 50 years, was shown at the Nesodden Kunstforening (Art Society).

In 2010 Meyer contributed a huge photographic exhibition to the opening of "Rockheim", the new national museum of rock music in Trondheim. His exhibition Icons of the 60's was made up of historical pictures in monumental sizes, mostly portraits of the musicians he had met during the 1960s, including John Lennon, Yoko Ono, The Rolling Stones, Bob Dylan, Rory Gallagher, Roy Orbison, Julie Felix and Norwegian artists like Terje Rypdal and Wenche Myhre.

In addition to his own exhibitions, Meyer has been a curator for a number of galleries and museums.

== As curator ==
- 1987 – Simulo (Oslo Rådhus), a postmodern photo exhibition
- 1989 – Den glemte tradisjonen (Oslo, Bergen, Trondhjem, Tromsø, Stavanger og Haugesund) Photography 150 years celebration.
- 1990 – Christer Strömholm (Bergen Kunstforening)
- 1991 – Splint (Kunstnernes hus, Oslo, Vestlandske Kunstindustrimuseum, Bergen)
- 1991 – Ernst Schwitters (Bergen Billedgalleri)
- 2005 – Edvard Munch, fotografiske selvportretter, (Munch 1863–1944) i Complesso del Vitoriano, Roma, Italia

In 2005, Meyer presented a selection of Edvard Munchs photographs as a part of the large exhibition of Edvard Munchs works: Munch 1863–1944, in Complesso del Vittoriano, Rome, Italy, and in connection with the 150 years celebration of Munch he prepared an exhibition of Munch’s photograph which is touring a selection of 15 local art associations all over Norway 2013 – 2015.

== The Robert Meyer Collection ==
Meyer has received wide recognition for his construction of The Robert Meyer Collection (RMC), the largest private Norwegian photo historic art collection, which he later placed in The National Museum of Art, Architecture and Design in Oslo. It includes about 10,000 images, with emphasis on the Norwegian and Nordic photography and a specialized library. Parts of the collection was presented in the exhibition The Forgotten Tradition (Den glemte tradisjonen) of Oslo Fine Art Society in 1989, and were later presented in several other cities in Norway. The Collection as such was presented as an exhibition “The Robert Meyer Collection”, at The National Museum of Art, Architecture and Design in 2005–2006.
