= Slomosa =

Norwegian rock band

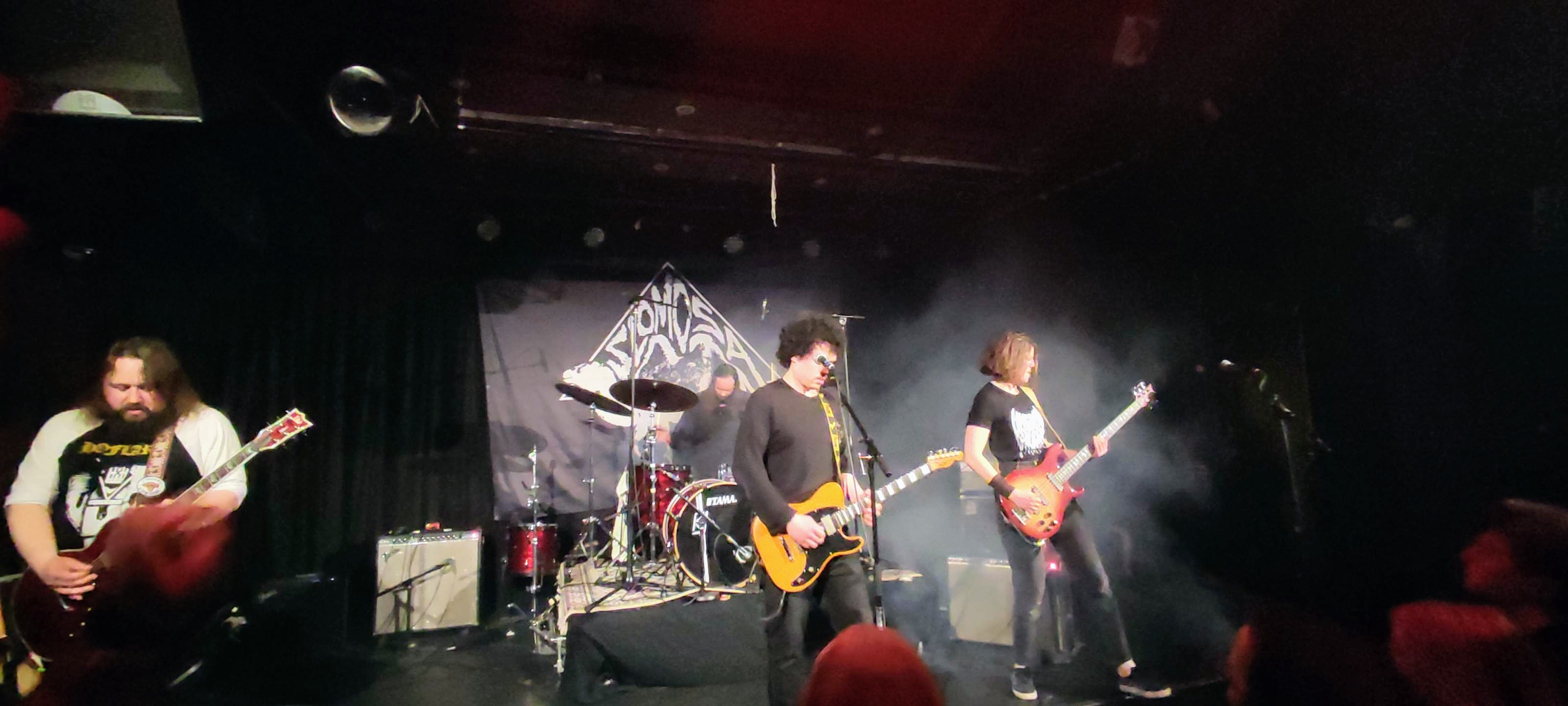
- Slomosa performing on the island of Stord in 2024

Background information
- Origin: Bergen, Norway
- Genres: Alternative rock; stoner rock; desert rock; hard rock; alternative metal
- Years active: 2016–present
- Labels: Apollon records; Hassle records; Stickman Records
- Website: www.slomosamusic.com

Slomosa is a Norwegian rock band from Bergen, Norway, established in 2016. Their sound is inspired by stoner rock and the desert rock scene. Their style has been self-described as "tundra rock", which is also the title of their second album from 2024.

== History ==
Slomosa released their first, self-titled album on Apollon Records in 2020, and their sophomore album titled Tundra Rock in 2024, for which they were awarded the award Best Rock album at Spellemannprisen. They were also awarded the Bendiksen Award in 2025. The same year they also played at the Norwegian metal festival Tons of Rock.

The band has also released a making-of video for their second album.

In 2022 they toured in Europe with the band Stöner, and again in 2024 with Greenleaf and also toured in the U.S. in 2025 with the band Helmet.

== Tundra and Lighting ==
In 2025, they headlined the first "Tundra and Lighting" festival at USF Verftet in Bergen, which has a focus on promoting local, heavy music.

== Members ==
=== Current lineup (as of 2022) ===
- Benjamin Berdous – guitar, vocal (2016–present)
- Tor Erik Bye – guitar (2019–present)
- Jard Hole – drums (2020–present)
- Marie Moe – bass (2020–present)

=== Past members ===
- Anders Rørlien – guitar (2016–2019)
- Kristian Tvedt – bass (2016–2019)
- Severin Sandvik – drums (2016–2020)

== Related bands ==
Marie Moe also played bass in the indie pop band Razika.

== Discography ==
=== Album ===
- 2020: Slomosa (Apollon records)
- 2024: Tundra Rock (Stickman records)
- 2026: Live in Bergen (Apollon records)

=== EPs ===
- 2024: Battling Guns (Stickman records)

=== Singles ===
- "There Is Nothing New Under The Sun", 2020
- "Horses", 2022
- "Cabin Fever", 2023
- "Rice", 2024
