= Bokassa (band) =

Norwegian rock band

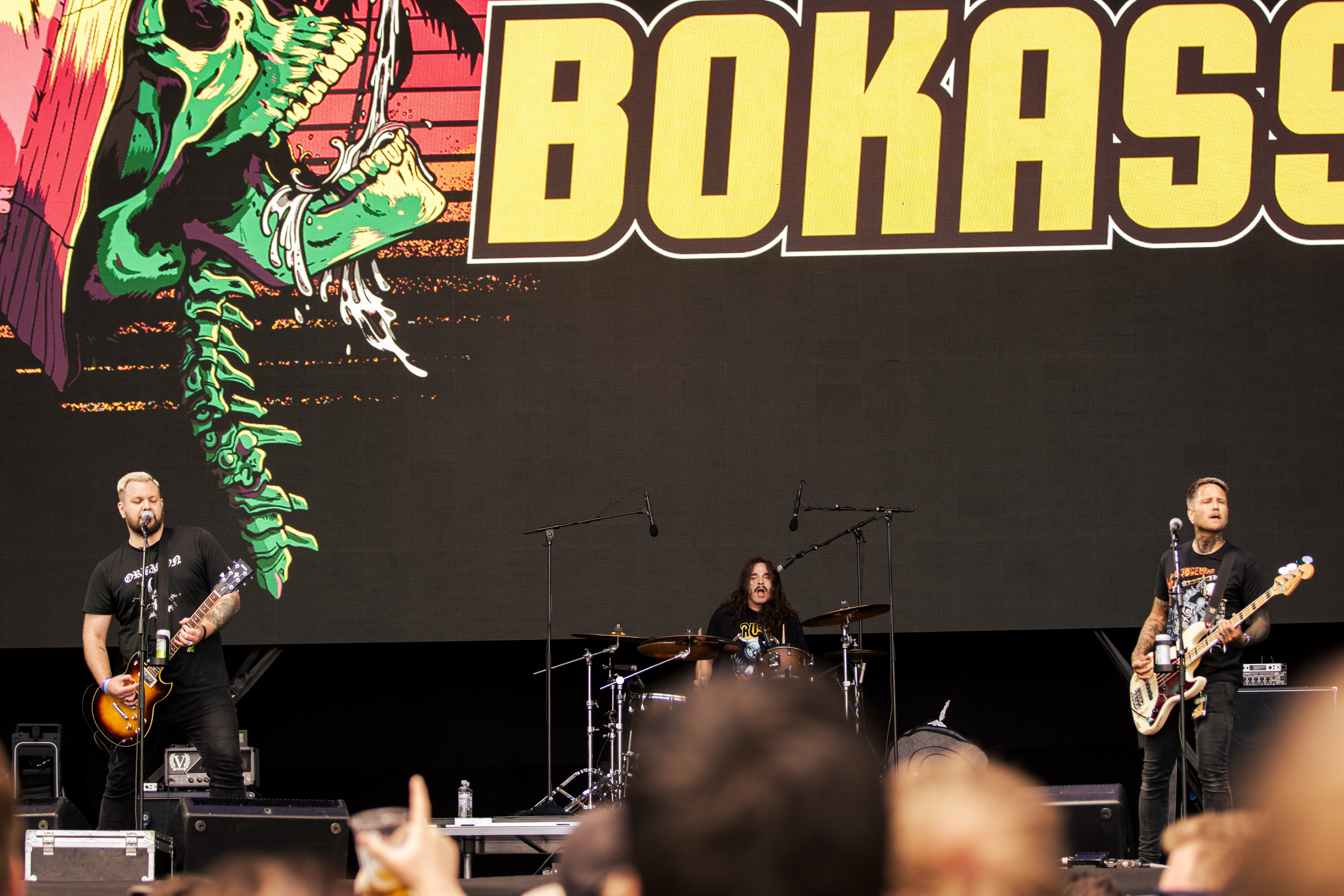
- Bokassa at Tons of Rock 2024

Background information
- Origin: Trondheim, Norway
- Genres: Stoner rock, hardcore punk
- Years active: 2013–present
- Labels: Mvka, Napalm Records, Indie Recordings
- Members: Jørn Kaarstad; Olav Dowkes; Ole Vistnes
- Past members: Lars Erik Andreassen; Eirik Angård; Bård Linga
- Website: bokassaband.com

Bokassa is a Norwegian rock band from Trondheim founded in 2013 by Jørn Kaarstad, Lars Erik Andreassen and Olav Dowkes. Originally, the band consisted of Jørn Kaarstad (guitar, vocals), Olav Dowkes (drums) and Lars Erik Andreassen (bass). In 2015, Eirik Angård replaced Lars Erik Andreassen. In 2016, Bård Linga replaced Angård. In 2024, Linga decided to leave the band on amicable terms. In 2024, bass player Inge Morten Gustafsholm toured with the band but announced the end of their collaboration on 24 September 2024. In October 2024, Ole Vistnes joined the band.

Bokassa has released four studio albums: Divide & Conquer (2017, self released), Crimson Riders (2019) on Mvka Music, Molotov Rocktail (2021) on Napalm Records and All Out of Dreams (2024) on Indie Recordings. The band toured Europe supporting Metallica on the WorldWired Tour in 2019, after Metallica's drummer Lars Ulrich gave the band a glowing endorsement.

The band released its fourth studio album 'All Out of Dreams' with Indie Recordings on 16 February 2024.

== Band members ==
Current members

Jørn Kaarstad (guitar, vocals).

Olav Dowkes (drums, backup vocals).

Ole Vistnes (bass, backup vocals).

Former members

Lars Erik Andreassen (bass, backup vocals).

Eirik Angård (bass, backup vocals).

Bård Linga (bass, backup vocals).

Former live members

Inge Morten Gustafsholm (bass, backup vocals).

== Discography ==
Albums

Divide & Conquer (2017), self released.

Crimson Riders (2019), MVKA.

Molotov Rocktail (2021), Napalm Records.

All Out of Dreams (2024), Indie Recordings.

EPs

War on Everything (2015), self released.

Make Music Great Again (2016), Kings of Stonerpunk Records.

Bokassa Live at the BBC (2020), MVKA.

Singles

"Only Gob can Judge Me" (2018), Loyal Blood Records.

"Hellbilly Handfishin'" (2018), Kings of Stonerpunk Records.

"Lost in the Ozone" (2023), Kings of Stonerpunk Records (Motörhead cover).

== History ==
=== Early years and the name Bokassa (2013–2017) ===
Jørn Kaarstad, Lars Erik Andreassen and Olav Dowkes had their first rehearsal in Trondheim in 2013, in a war bunker turned into a rehearsal place. Kaarstad and Andreassen knew each other from work; and Andreassen and Dowkes had met before at a party at which they played together in a Eurovision cover band.

The band is named after the former dictator of the Central African Republic Jean-Bédel Bokassa. In 2019 Kaarstad said: “we sing about a lot of the atrocities in the world and we felt that Bokassa was a fitting name. In the West you've heard about a lot of dictators, but we tend to forget the other places in the world. That's why we chose Bokassa, because that is an atrocity that happened that not many people know about.” Kaarstad also explained that people sometimes think they are called bokkasse (bookcase in Norwegian), which “sounds like an indie band”. In another interview he shared some of the alternative names that they considered for the band, including Mother Trucker.

Bokassa's first album “Divide and Conquer”, released in 2017, was well received in Norway and earned Bokassa some recognition in their home country. Norwegian rock celebrity Kristopher Schau declared it was the best Norwegian record of the year.

=== Lars Ulrich's endorsement and tour with Metallica (2018–2019) ===
In early 2018 Metallica's drummer Lars Ulrich declared on his Beats 1 radio show "It's Electric!" that Bokassa was his “favorite new band”. "These guys are f***ing insanely cool” he said, “I heard most of the first record and all the songs are f***ing way next level." Speaking about the music video for "No Control," Ulrich continued: "There's a super cool ... black and white video of them sitting in a bar drinking beer. It's like a one-shot, and all their friends come up behind them and help them sing the song and take their beer from them. I know it doesn't sound like much of a concept but it works really well, it's really cool."

A month later, Bokassa received an email from Metallica's management inviting the band to meet with Lars Ulrich in Oslo where Metallica was playing in May 2018. They accepted the invitation and met with Ulrich.

In June 2018, Metallica's management called Jørn Kaarstad to offer Bokassa a supporting spot in Metallica's upcoming 2019 European stadium tour WorldWired. Kaarstad, thinking it was a scam call, declined the call. He then received a long text from Metallica's management, and realized then that the call was legitimate and not a scam. Kaarstad called them back. He then called his bandmates Olav Dowkes and Bård Linga to share the news. The band accepted the offer. The band celebrated the news in Kaarstad's flat but received strict instructions to not share the news with anyone. They kept the news to themselves for three months.

Two days before the official announcement, someone in Spain drove a truck on which the artwork for the tour was displayed, featuring Metallica, Bokassa and the Swedish band Ghost. Some people took pictures of the truck and posted them on social media, tagging Bokassa and asking for confirmation that this was real. In a 2019 interview, Kaarstad expressed his relief that it was not his bandmates or himself who had spilled the beans, and that it had been very hard to keep the news secret.

On 24 September 2018 Metallica announced that Bokassa would be one of their supports for the summer of 2019, together with Ghost.

Between 1 May 2019 (Lisbon) and 25 August 2019 (Mannheim), Bokassa played in 25 venues across Europe opening for Metallica. The tour immensely increased the band's visibility and popularity. Five years later, in a 2024 interview, Jørn Kaarstad admitted: “Lars Ulrich basically made our career.”

On off days, in between the dates with Metallica, Bokassa played their own headline concerts in clubs.

=== Crimson Riders (2019) ===
On 21 June 2019, Bokassa released their second album Crimson Riders, which was very well received. Fermor-Worrell from Distorted Sound rated the record as 10/10 and wrote in his review: “Crimson Riders isn’t merely just Divide & Conquer 2.0 – it’s a monumental step-up in quality from an already promising band, putting forward a concise yet entirely enjoyable collection of huge, arena-ready anthems.” Sam Law from Kerrang! Wrote: “Picking up where 2017 debut Divide & Conquer left off, this riotous second LP feels like the perfect escalation.”

In the fall of that year, they toured the album in Europe and the UK (Riffs, Hooks, Breakdowns and Freedom tour) with 23 dates.

=== Molotov Rocktail (2020–2023) ===
In 2020 Bokassa were set to play at Domination Festival in Mexico, Headbangers Holiday in Croatia, Bukta Open Air Festival, Malakoff Rock Festival, Alta live, Pstereo Festival, Bygdalarm, Månefestival, Norway Rock, as well as in clubs in Norway. However, due to the COVID-19 pandemic, they only played at Eurosonics in Groningen (Netherlands) and at the Odal MicroRock Festival in Norway. They also played several dates in Norway before the March lockdown.

In 2021 Bokassa released Molotov Rocktail. The record immediately went to number 18 on the Norwegian chart, their highest spot to date. It received good reviews, with Jani L. from Tuonela Magazine writing: “The new album is an endearingly old-fashioned, cohesive tightrope act of punk singalongs and highly contagious stoner grooves”. Rich Hobson from Metal Hammer placed the album in his best albums of 2021 list (number 9).

However, the COVID-19 pandemic prevented them from fully touring the album. That year they only played a few restricted shows in Norway. They also went on a UK Headline tour and played in London, Manchester, Southampton, Glasgow, Cardiff and Wolverhampton.

In 2022, they played in Europe and the UK in (co)-headline shows, at festivals such as Paaspop, Download, Tons of Rock, Hellfest, Wacken Open Air, Rockfest, and Full Metal Holiday; and as supports for Judas Priest, Baroness, and Mastodon.

In 2023 they supported Zebrahead and Therapy?, played at several German and Norwegian festivals, at the Rockwave festival in Greece, and at the Full Metal Cruise.

=== All Out of Dreams (2024–present) ===
In 2024 they released their fourth album All Out of Dreams with Indie Recordings. The album was recorded, mixed and mastered by Tue Madsen in Antfarm Studio in Denmark in June 2022. For the first time, Bokassa have guest artists on the album: Lou Koller from Sick of it All and Aaron Beam from Red Fang.

All Out of Dreams was critically acclaimed as “fantastic” (Kerrang!). In his review for Distorted Sound, Tim Bolitho-Jones wrote: “even in the grimmer moments, All Out Of Dreams is a delight.”

In the spring of 2024, just after the release of All Out of Dreams they toured Norway, playing 15 concerts.

That year they played at several festivals, including Greenfield Festival in Switzerland, Resurrection Fest in Spain, Tons of Rock and Soroyrocken in Norway, Wacken, Elbriot, Reload and Summer Breeze in Germany, and Full Metal Holiday in Mallorca.

They also played as supports of Red Fang (Berlin), Life of Agony (Kiel and Düsseldorf) and Ignite (Hannover).

In the Fall of 2024, they toured Germany, Switzerland and the Netherlands, with 11 dates altogether.

Finally in November 2024, they played in the Norwegian towns of Sogndal and Florø.

In 2025 they continued touring the album, starting with a performance at Nida Rock Festival in Norway in February, followed by three dates in Norway in March (Trondheim, Notodden, and Mandal).

After playing at the Full Metal Mayrhofen Festival in Austria in April, they announced they would be supporting Clutch's Europe tour in the Fall of 2025, with 19 dates across Europe and the UK.

Still in April, they went on a UK tour with 8 dates. That tour was their first Headline Tour in the UK since 2021.

At the end of April they returned to Germany to play at the Mosh N' May Metal Festival in Schapen.

== Musical style, influences and live performances ==
Bokassa plays punk rock/hardcore with stoner riffs and metal, a style they self-labeled as stonerpunk. On social media and on merchandising Bokassa describe themselves as the Kings of Stonerpunk. The phrase also appears in the track Molotov Rocktail (on the album Molotov Rocktail), which opens with those words: “I’m the leader, I’m renowned. The King of Stonerpunk, but where is my crown?”. Jørn Kaarstad writes most of Bokassa's music and lyrics and has cited Fu Manchu, Entombed, Slayer, Bad Religion and especially NOFX as his favourite bands and main influences.

Bokassa's tracks often feature puns (e.g. Walker Texas Danger, Captain Cold One, Blunt Force Karma, Immortal Space Pirate 3 -Too Old for this Sith), which set a lighter tone despite the dark lyrics. The lyrics often contain funny parts and puns in otherwise serious tracks. For example, Hereticules (on the album Molotov Rocktail) contains the following words: “I joined a Mormon church to fix up my life. I went bankrupt and got nine ex-wives.” Careless’ lyrics (on the album Molotov Rocktail) include: “‘Check out this blackened Balkan jazz’. ‘No, I f***ing won’t’. ‘I think you will enjoy it’. ‘No, I didgeridon’t!’”.

Some tracks also contain what Kaarstad has described as Easter eggs, meaning references to songs by other bands. One example can be found in the track Molotov Rocktail that references Chinese Democracy, Guns N’ Roses’ 2008 studio album. Another example is Muse’s Origins of Symmetry being mentioned in Captain Cold One (on the album Crimson Riders). That same track also names Trivium, Nickelback and P!nk.

Bokassa’s music frequently combines aggressive riffs with singalong choruses. In a review of Mototov Rocktail, editor Jannik Kleemann wrote: “In ‘Burn It All (PTSDEAD)’ Bokassa sing about how the dream is dead. The fascinating thing about it is that the way it is sung here makes me imagine smiling people arm in arm at a live concert, shouting ‘The dream is dead’ together”.

Bokassa’s live performances further reflect this ambivalence. On stage, they mix serious, dark and heavy music with self-deprecating banter and jokes. Speaking about a Bokassa show in Manchester in 2021, journalist Lamestream Lydia noted: “Their songs are incredibly strong but it’s the band’s stage presence that makes them stand tall, even while the band had had a few, they still played their songs perfectly and established an almost instant connection to the crowd which included various members photobombing pictures taken in the crowd”.

== Accolades and awards ==
=== 2017 ===
Divide and Conquer, Metal Hammer's list of the best debut albums of 2017.

=== 2019 ===
Divide and Conquer, Best Norwegian album of the decade (number 26), Gaffa Norway.

=== 2020 ===
50 best songs of 2019, number 23 Mouthbreathers, Rockman.

Nominated for a Spellemann-Award (Norwegian Grammy) as Breakthrough of the Year.

=== 2021 ===
Winner of the Norwegian Bendiksprisen. The jury of this prestigious award, comprising fellow Norwegian musicians, stated: “It is on stage that the music really comes into its own. The winner has a stage presence that not only asks for the audience's attention, but outright demands it”.

== Equipment ==
Jørn Kaarstad is endorsed by Victory. Olav Dowkes is endorsed by Tama Drums and Wincent. Ole Vistnes is endorsed by Tribe.
