= Sibiir =

Norwegian hard metal rock band

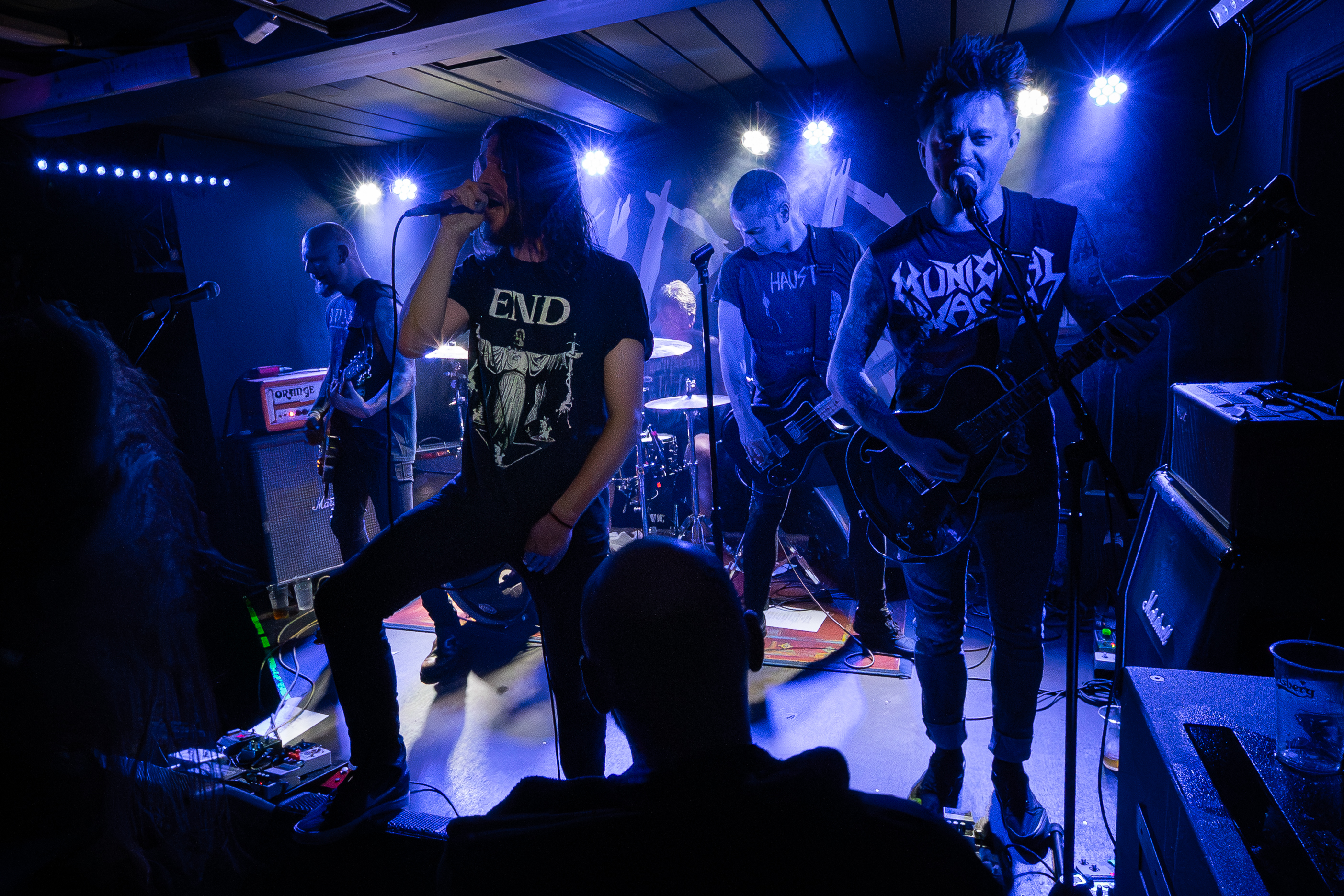
- Sibiir on stage in 2024

Background information
- Origin: Oslo, Norway
- Genres: Blackened Hardcore
- Years active: 2014-present
- Labels: Fysisk Format
- Members: Jimmy Nymoen; Tobias Gausemel Backe; Steffen Grønneberg; Kent Nordli; Eivind Kjølstad
- Website: https://www.sibiir.com

SIBIIR is a Norwegian blackened hardcore band from Oslo.

The band was formed in 2014, and released their first single in 2015. Since then, SIBIIR has released three critically acclaimed albums on the label Fysisk Format.

== History ==
The band consists of Jimmy Nymoen (vocals), Tobias Gausemel Backe (guitar), Steffen Grønneberg (guitar), Kent Nordli (bass) and Eivind Kjølstad (drums), and was formed in Oslo in 2014.

Their first single Swallow and Trap Them! was premiered exclusively on MetalSucks, who wrote: "This is one of those songs you pretty much have to be a crazy person not to dig".

Their self titled debut album SIBIIR was released in 2016, and got great reviews from several music magazines. Of their second album, Ropes, Metal Injection wrote: "If nasty vocals, blackened guitars, and fiercely punk drumming is your jam, then you owe it to yourself to check out SIBIIR".

Both Ropes and their 2024-release Undergang were nominated for Spellemannprisen under the (Hardrock and) Metal section.

SIBIIR has toured around in Europe, and played at festivals like Roskilde Festival, Øyafestivalen, and Inferno Metal Festival. They have been on tour with bands like Kvelertak and Enslaved (band).

== Releases ==
=== Albums ===
- SIBIIR, Fysisk Format, 2016
- Ropes, Fysisk Format, 2019
- Undergang, Fysisk Format, 2024

=== Singles ===
- Swallow and Trap Them!/ These Rats We Deny, Disiplin Media, 2015
