= Eco-Lighthouse =

Norwegian environmental management certification scheme

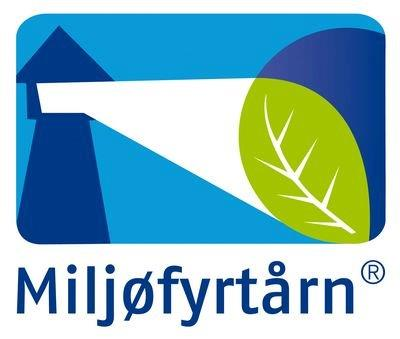
Eco Lighthouse certification logo

Eco-Lighthouse is a Norwegian environmental management certification scheme, operated by the Eco-Lighthouse Foundation in Kristiansand. About 7700 Norwegian private and public organisations are certified, mostly SMEs. The objective is to achieve and document continuous improvement using the Plan-Do-Check-Act-cycle. Since 2017, the Eco-Lighthouse scheme is recognized by the EU to be equivalent to EMAS and ISO 14001 in public procurement.

== History ==
In 1996, Kristiansand Municipality started a project together with local enterprises in order to operate more environmentally friendly. The project inspired several other municipalities in Norway to start similar projects. A key factor for success was extensive collaboration with important national actors.

From 2000 Eco-Lighthouse (in Norwegian "Miljøfyrtårn") was driven as a 3-year national project with financial support of the Ministry of Climate and Environment. Evaluations of this project were positive. In 2003 the non-profit Eco-Lighthouse Foundation was established by the following parties:

- Enterprise Federation of Norway
- Confederation of Norwegian Enterprise
- Norwegian Confederation of Trade Unions
- Norwegian Association of Small & Medium Enterprises
- Norwegian Association of Local and Regional Authorities
- Innovation Norway
- Buskerud and Nordland counties
- The municipalities of Bergen, Drammen, Haram, Kristiansand, Larvik, Oslo, Ringsaker, Stavanger, Tromsø, Trondheim, and Ålesund.

Due to membership in the European Economic Area, a new law for public procurement had to come into effect in Norway in 2017. This meant that Directive 2014/24/EU article 62.2 on environmental management systems was to be incorporated in Norwegian law. In principle, only environmental certification according to the Eco-Management and Audit Scheme (EMAS) or ISO 14001 would qualify in public procurement. National systems like the Eco-Lighthouse would only be allowed when approved according to Article 45 of Regulation (EC) No 1221/2009, i.e. when recognized to comply with EMAS requirements.

Without such approval, the about 5000 Eco-Lighthouse certified organizations would not be allowed to participate in public bids in Norway. In 2015 the Eco-Lighthouse foundation therefore started the process to achieve EMAS recognition. The Directorate-General for the Environment in Brussels led the process on behalf of the EU.

The application process took two-and-a-half years and was performed in good cooperation with the Directorate. Collaboration with the Norwegian Ministry of Climate and Environment and the Confederation of Norwegian Enterprise ensured that Eco-Lighthouse remained a valid certification scheme in 2017 while the application process was still proceeding. Recognition was obtained on the 6th of December 2017.

Afterwards, the number of new Eco-Lighthouse certifications has increased every year. The scheme is updated and extended regularly with emphasis on industries with large indirect environmental impact like designers and banks.

== Description of the scheme ==
In order to certify as an Eco-Lighthouse, an organisation has to comply with one or more sets of governance and environmental criteria. All organisations have to comply with the general industry criteria and to relevant sets of industry-specific criteria.

The Eco-Lighthouse Foundation is the organiser of the scheme. Most municipalities in Norway are paying members and act as certifying bodies. The actual certification is performed by certifiers trained and approved by the Eco-Lighthouse Foundation. The language of the scheme is Norwegian and it is adapted to Norwegian law.

=== Organisation ===
The Eco-Lighthouse certification is managed by the Eco-Lighthouse Foundation. However, the certifying body is the municipality where the organisation applying for certification is resident. Most Norwegian municipalities are paying members of the scheme. As certifying body, they control which certifiers are allowed to operate in the municipality. However, the Eco-Lighthouse Foundation trains and approves all certifiers and subjects all certifications to a quality control before issuing the diploma.

Organisations are obliged to hire a certified Eco-Lighthouse consultant for the first-time certification process. They are free to choose which consultant to use and the extent of the support by this consultant. Eco-Lighthouse certifiers are often also approved as consultants, but cannot perform both roles for the same organisation.

A more detailed description of the roles:

=== Eco-Lighthouse Foundation ===
- Develops criteria for certification. Regular updates and new industry criteria are issued to keep the scheme relevant
- Manages the web portal
- Trains and approves Eco-Lighthouse consultants and certifiers
- Maintains contact with the Eco-Lighthouse responsible appointed by municipalities
- Performs a final verification before approving the certification after recommendation of certifiers
- Generates the certificate for the organisation and sends the diploma to the municipality in which the organisation is resident

=== Municipalities ===
- Sign up for to the Eco-Lighthouse scheme membership
- Appoint an internal Eco-Lighthouse responsible whose duties are to keep contact with the Eco-Lighthouse Foundation and certifiers, and to promote the scheme within the municipality
- Appoint certifiers who can perform certifications within the municipality. These can be municipal employees or privately employed.
- Deliver diplomas to newly certified organisations. In smaller municipalities, the diploma is normally delivered to the organisation by the mayor. In larger municipalities, like Oslo, special arrangements are organized to celebrate new Eco-Lighthouses
- Optional: get their own organisations like municipal administration, kindergartens and nursery homes certified

=== Certifier ===
- Receives training from and follows guidelines set by the Eco-Lighthouse Foundation. Attends a yearly refresher course
- Certifies and re-certifies organisations, usually on-site
- Conducts annual review with headquarters of larger organisations

=== Consultant ===
Soirce

- Receives training from and follows guidelines set by the Eco-Lighthouse Foundation. Attends a yearly refresher course
- Introduces organisations to the Eco-Lighthouse web portal
- Guides organisations through the certification process

Roles within organisations certified as Eco-Lighthouse (in small organisations, the environmental manager is often part of top management):

=== Top management ===
- Ensures compliance to all relevant HSE and environmental regulations
- Supports the certification process
- Shows willingness to change operational procedures in order to achieve a more eco-friendly operation
- Conducts an annual review of the HSE and Eco-Lighthouse system, including approving new KPIs and measures

=== Environmental manager ===
- Is responsible for the environmental statement prior to certification
- Is the organisation’s main representative in the audit with the certifier
- Is responsible for preparing the annual environmental reports, getting them approved by management and sending them to the Eco-Lighthouse Foundation before the 1st of April the following year
- Has to start and follow up the recertification process after 3 years
- Is responsible for setting up a framework for continuous environmental improvement, for example by regular meetings with top management and staff responsible for environmental measures
- Promotes the Eco-Lighthouse scheme towards all stakeholders of the organisation

=== Process towards certification ===
The following steps are required for organizations in order to become and stay certified as Eco-Lighthouse:

- Sign a contract with a certified consultant
- Fill out the environmental statement and annual report for the previous year in the Eco-Lighthouse web portal. Where necessary, implement measures to comply with the criteria.
- Become certified by a Eco-Lighthouse certifier
- Work for continuous improvements using the Plan-Do-Check-Act cycle, documented in annual reports
- Get re-certified after 3 years on basis of a new environmental statement and submitted annual reports

Municipalities and corporations located at four locations or more use a variation of this model, where the headquarter can fulfil certain criteria on behalf of the whole organisation.

=== Eco-Lighthouse web portal ===
The work towards certification is to be documented in the Eco-Lighthouse web portal. All involved parties have access to the organisation’s data in the web portal.

The web portal includes (all in Norwegian):

- Basic information about the organisation
- The environmental statement(s) with all relevant criteria for the organisation
- Guidance to the criteria, when appropriate with templates
- Yearly Climate and Environmental reports
- Graphs visualising data from the Climate and Environmental reports
- CO_{2}-account according to the Greenhouse Gas Protocol

=== Environmental statement ===
The environmental statement consists of pre-defined industry-specific criteria tailored for Norwegian enterprises.

All organisations must comply with the General Industry criteria.

In addition, there are about 80 sets of industry-specific criteria, for instance for construction, manufacturing, hairdressing, architecture and education. Organisations must comply with the appropriate sets with criteria. Some organisations have several sets of industry-specific criteria to comply with. Others, mainly service-providers, have none.

Some industries, like fish farming or power generation do not have suitable sets of criteria. Thus, organisations working within these sectors cannot be certified as Eco-Lighthouse.

Topics covered in the criteria sets (industry-specific criteria do not necessarily include all topics):

- System criteria (covering governance)
- Work environment
- Procurement
- Transport
- Energy
- Waste
- Emission
- Aesthetics
- Additional environmental aspects – a review whether there are additional significant environmental aspects not covered in the environmental statement yet

=== Annual Climate and Environmental report ===
An Annual Climate and Environmental report covering the previous calendar year must be delivered in the web portal prior to first time certification. Afterwards, a report has to be submitted before the 1st of April every year. A summary of the report shall be made accessible to the general public

The Annual Climate and Environmental report consists of 4 parts:

1. KPIs of the previous year
2. Measures taken in the previous year to improve environmental performance
3. Target KPIs for the coming year
4. Planned measures for improvement in the coming year in order to meet the target KPIs

The annual reports will be taken into account during recertification.

When the Annual report is declared final, the greenhouse gas emissions are calculated according to the GHG-protocol. The organisation can also compare its environmental performance against other organisations in the same industry.

=== Costs ===
In general, the largest cost factor for Eco-Lighthouse implementation are the working hours own employees spend implementing and documenting the various criteria.

Other costs during implementation are

- Start fee for access to the Eco-Lighthouse web portal, which is dependent on the number of employees.
- Consultant fees, in average about 20 working hours
- Certifier fees, in average about 10 working hours

Afterwards, a lower yearly service fee is to be paid for use of the web portal. Organisations are not obliged to hire a consultant for re-certification after 3 years, but the cost for the certifier are the same as for first-time certification.

== Certified organisations ==
About 7700 public and private organisations in Norway are certified as Eco-Lighthouse. Their size and type is very diverse. Surveys show that a large majority is satisfied with the scheme.

Several municipalities like Oslo certified their own operational units, like schools and senior resident centres.

In the private sector, Eco-Lighthouse certified companies vary from larger corporations to very small companies.

Although the number of certifications is significant and increasing, it is still small compared to the total number of organisations in Norway.

Barriers towards certification are found to be:

- No environmental certification is required by clients, neither in the public nor private sector
- Organisations are overestimating the cost and amount of work necessary to get an Eco-Lighthouse certification
- The benefits of the certification process (other than diploma) are underestimated, like cost reduction due to proper waste management and increased environmental consciousness amongst employees
