= The Good The Bad and The Zugly =

Norwegian punk rock band

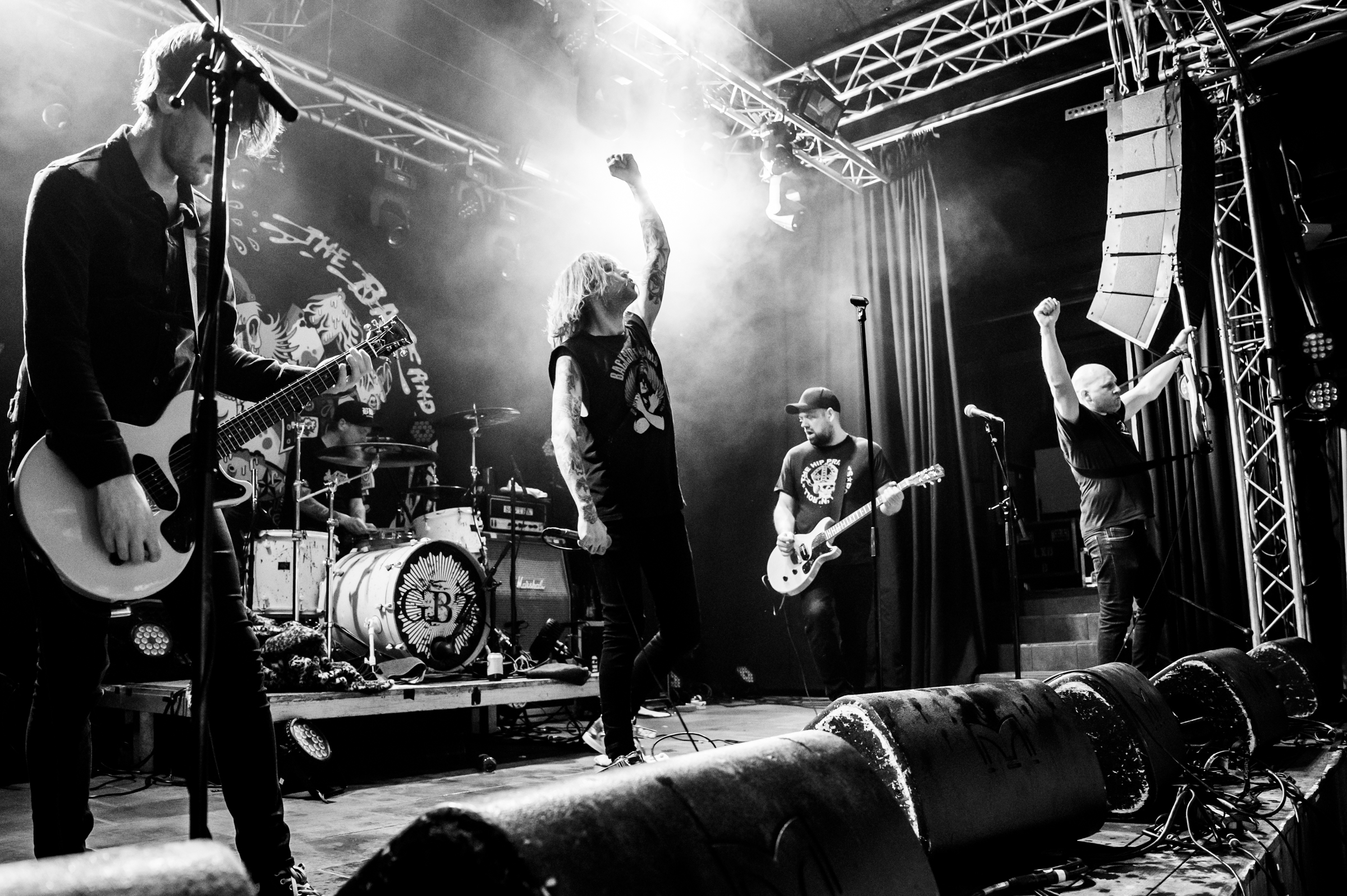

Background information
- Origin: Hadeland, Norway
- Genres: Punk rock
- Years active: 2011–present
- Members: Eirik Melstrøm; Kim Skaug; Magne Vannebo; Lars Gulbrandsen; Ivar Nikolaisen

The Good The Bad and The Zugly is a Norwegian punk rock band from Hadeland formed in 2011. It consists of members Eirik Melstrøm (guitar), Kim Skaug (guitar), Magne Vannebo (drums), Lars Gulbrandsen (bass) and Ivar Nikolaisen (vocals), who is also the lead vocalist for Kvelertak.

The band won the Spellemannprisen in 2018 in the rock category with their album Misanthropical House. They have were also nominated for the same award in 2015 for Hadeland Hardcore, in 2020 for Algorithm & Blues and in 2022 for Research and Destroy.

== Discography ==
=== Albums ===
- Anti World Music (2013)
- Hadeland Hardcore (2015)
- The Worst Four Years (Komp.) (2017)
- Misanthropical House (2018)
- Algorithm & Blues (2020)
- Research and Destroy (2022)
- Decade of Regression (2024)
- November Boys (2025)
