= Tuonela Productions =

- Industry: Board games Digital games
- Founded: 2006
- Headquarters: Oulu, Finland
- Products: Oil Field; Modern Society; Soul Hunters; Inquisitio; The Club; Golems

Tuonela Productions Ltd. is a game development and publishing company from Oulu, Northern Finland. Tuonela was founded in 2006. Tuonela produces both board games and digital games. They also distribute some other publishers' board games.

Tuonela was the first Finnish company to get their board game (The Club, 2008) distributed outside Europe. Tuonela's games "The Club" (published in 2008) and "Modern Society" (2009) are distributed by Fred Distribution in the US, UK and Asia. In 2008 "The Club" received noticeable attention in Finnish media since it was the most widely distributed Finnish board game at the time.

The Company's CEO Jussi Autio is also their main game designer. He has designed both ”The Club” and ”Modern Society”. He is also a candidate in the Finnish Parliament Election 2011.

== Games by Tuonela ==
=== Board Games ===
Game	Published
Oil Field	2007
The Club	2008
Modern Society	2009
Soul Hunters	2009
Inquisitio	2009
The Club DJ-Set	2010

=== Online Games ===
Game	Published
Oil Field	2007
Modern Society	2009

=== iPhone Games ===
Game	Published
The Club	2009
Golems	2011
