= Joachim Nielsen =

Norwegian rock musician and poet

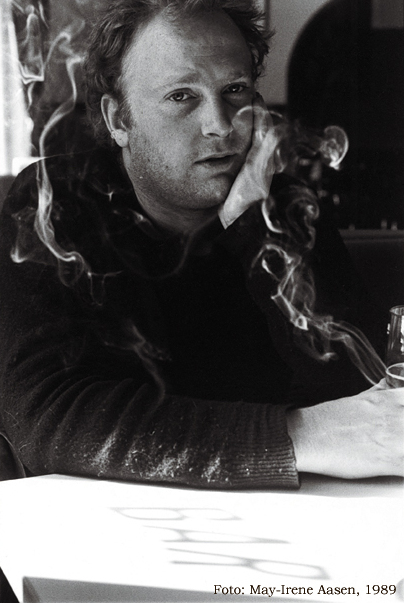
- Born: 8 September 1964; Oslo, Norway
- Died: 17 October 2000 (aged 36); Oslo, Norway
- Other name: Jokke
- Occupations: Rock musician and poet
- Family: Christopher Nielsen (brother)

Joachim Nielsen (8 September 1964 – 17 October 2000), better known as Jokke, was a Norwegian rock musician and poet. He was the frontman of Norwegian rock band Jokke & Valentinerne, the brother of cartoonist Christopher Nielsen, and son of the artist John David Nielsen. He is considered to be one of the greatest songwriters in Norway.

By the mid-1990s, Jokke had developed a heroin addiction, and had several stays at rehabilitation clinics. By the turn of the millennium, many of his close friends believed that he had conquered his addiction. However, he died suddenly of a heroin overdose in October 2000, aged 36.

In 2005, a double tribute album entitled Det beste til meg og mine venner (The best for me and my friends) was released, which featured cover versions of Jokke's best known work from Norwegian artists. Later that year (around Christmas time) a single was released featuring three previously unreleased songs, called Tomgang.

In November 2005, a proposal came up in the "old town" of Oslo that Nielsen should get a street in the new part of Oslo (Bjørvika) named after him. In December this proposal was declined. The committee agreed instead that he could get a street in Grønland, Oslo. This street is now called "Joachim Nielsens gang" ("Joachim Nielsen's aisle") and the sign for it came up in September 2006. The closest neighbor is a bar and a theater. They also suggested to put up a statue of him, but his family did not approve of this.

== Jokke and Valentinerne ==
Jokke & Valentinerne
- Origin: Oslo, Norway
- Genres: Rock
- Years active: 1982–1994
- Label: Sonet Norsk Grammofon AS
- Members: Joachim Nielsen; Petter Pogo; May Irene Aasen

Jokke & Valentinerne (Jokke and the Valentines) were formed in 1982, consisting of Nielsen on guitar and vocals, his longtime partner May-Irene Aasen on drums and Håkon Torgersen on bass. The band went on to become one of the most popular bands in Oslo's underground rock scene. Their first album Alt kan repareres (Everything can be repaired) was released in 1986. The band is regarded as one of the "Great Four" Norwegian-language rock bands of the 1980s, along with deLillos, DumDum Boys and Raga Rockers. The band drew their influences mainly from punk and American Southern rock.

Much of the band's lyrics were about alcohol, and Jokke had a reputation of frequently getting drunk on stage. In 1992, he created a scandal when he received Spellemannprisen (the Norwegian equivalent of the Grammy awards) visibly drunk and/or under the influence of drugs. Still, one must not dismiss his lyrics as being shallow drinking songs. All his lyrics, including the much-played and catchy Øl ("Beer"), have a deeper tone describing a harsh lifestyle with drugs, alcohol and general anxiety towards the society and the people close to him. Nielsen's lyricism is closely related to the American writer Charles Bukowski, in describing societal underdogs, misfits and so-called anti-heroes. Nielsen's lyrics show strong sympathy for people who are somewhat scarred by life, and in addition, are deeply working class-conscious. The Norwegian poet Rudolf Nilsen and musician Alf Prøysen are two other influences, in both a literal and a musical sense.

== JEPS ==
JEPS is short for "Jokke's Eget PlateSelskap" ("Jokke's Own RecordCompany"). Joachim Nielsen used this abbreviation on some of the CDs he released.

=== Last line-up ===
- Joachim Nielsen – vocals and guitar (1982–1994)
- Petter Pogo – guitar, bass (1990–1994)
- May-Irene Aasen – drums and percussion, vocals (1982–1994)

=== Former members ===
- Håkon Torgersen – bass (1984–1990)
- Lars Lothe – guitar, vocals (1982–1983)
- Waldemar Hepstein – piano (1985)
- Trygve Johansen – piano (1982–1983)
- Christian Ellingsgård – bass (1982–1983)

== Discography ==
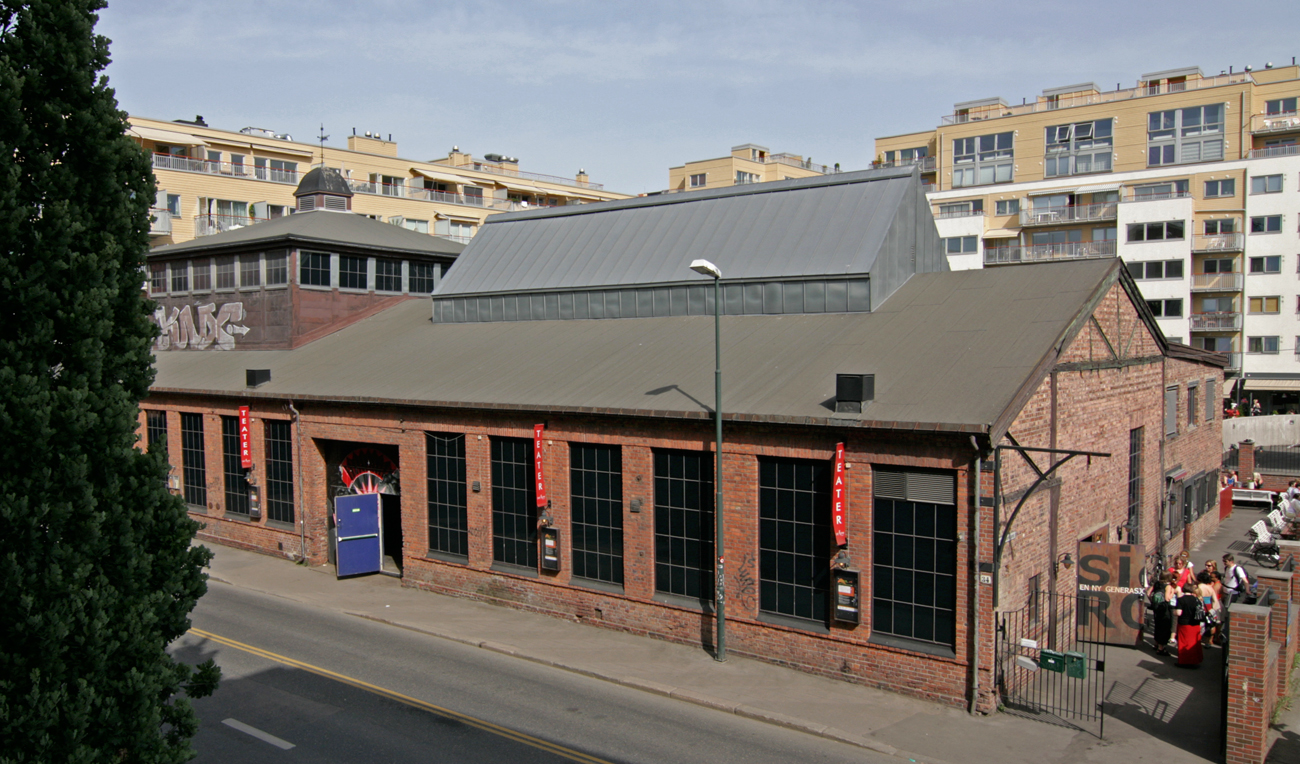
Joachim Nielsens gang ("Joachim Nielsen's aisle") is the short alley between the brick fence and the wall.

=== Jokke and Valentinerne ===
==== Albums ====
- Alt kan repareres (1986)
- Et hundeliv (1987)
- III (1990)
- Frelst (1991)
- Alt kan repeteres (1994)

==== Singles ====
- To fulle menn (1987)
- Gnukk (1991)
- Ta meg med (1994)

==== Compilations ====
- Spenn! (1995)
- Prisen for popen (2002)
- Levende (Så Lenge Det Varer) (2009)

=== Soloalbum ===
- Nykter (1996)

=== Jokke med Tourettes ===
- Trygge Oslo (1997)
- Billig Lykke (1999)
- Tomgang (2005)
