= Raga Rockers =

Norwegian rock band

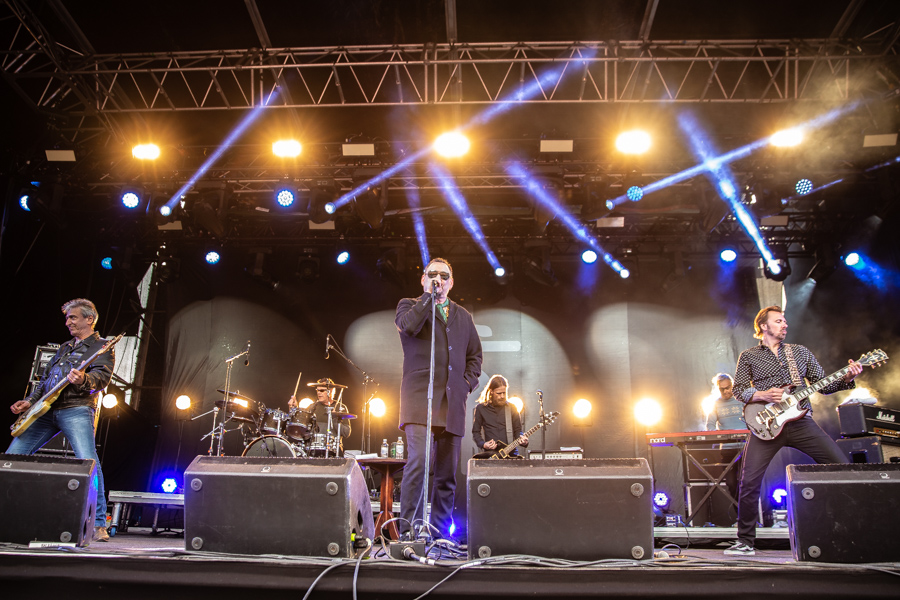
- Raga Rockers performing live in Oslo in 2018.

Background information
- Origin: Oslo, Norway
- Genres: Rock and roll, new wave, rock, raga rock, post-punk
- Years active: 1982–present
- Labels: Intence Music; Sonet; Black Pop; S2 Records; EMI; Sony; Universal; Drabant Music
- Members: Michael Krohn; Eivind Staxrud; Henning Sandsdalen; Livio Aiello; Arne Sæther; Jan Arne Kristiansen
- Past members: Bruno Hovden; Tore Berg; Nils Aune; Hugo Alvarstein
- Website: http://www.ragarockers.no

Raga Rockers is a Norwegian rock band. The band was formed in 1982 in Oslo by former vocalist Michael Krohn (now a guitarist since he retired from singing March 17, 2025 due to COPD and asthma with Ivar Eidem replacing him in vocals), bassist Livio Aiello, guitarist Bruno Hovden and drummer Jan Arne Kristiansen. Raga Rocker's musical style has evolved throughout the years and is often characterized as melodic rock with dark and satirical lyrics. The band's current lineup comprises founding members Krohn, Aiello and Kristiansen, guitarists Eivind Staxsrud and Henning Sandsdalen, and keyboardist Arne Sæther.

Raga Rockers is considered one of the "big four" Norwegian bands who popularized modern rock with Norwegian lyrics in the 1980s alongside Jokke & Valentinerne, DeLillos and DumDum Boys. The band has released twelve studio albums, four live albums and two compilation albums.

== Band members ==
Current members

- Michael Krohn – vocals (1982–2025), guitar (2025-present)
- Eivind Staxsrud – guitars (2009–present)
- Henning Sandsdalen – guitars (2018–present)
- Livio Aiello – bass (1982–present)
- Arne Sæther – keyboards (2007–present)
- Jan Arne Kristiansen – drums, percussion (1982–present)

Former members

- Bruno Hovden – guitars (1982–1985; died 1985)
- Tore Berg – guitars, keyboards (1984–2005)
- Nils Aune – guitars (1988–2009)
- Hugo Alvarstein – guitar, keyboards (1995–2010)

== Discography ==
Studio albums

- The Return of the Raga Rockers (1983)
- Maskiner i Nirvana (1985)
- Varme dager (1986)
- Forbudte følelser (1988)
- Blaff (1989)
- Rock'n'Roll Party (1990)
- Perler for svin (1995)
- Til helvete med Raga Rockers (1997)
- Raga Rockers (2000)
- Übermensch (2007)
- Shit Happens (2010)
- Faktor X (2013)

Live albums

- Raga Live (1990)
- Alive again (1996)
- Fritt liv (2012)
- Rockefeller 20.06.14 (2016)

Compilation albums

- The Beginning of The Raga Rockers (1992)
- Ragas beste 1983–2000/live roskilde 1999 (2005)
