= Bukta Tromsø Open Air Festival =

Music festival in Tromsø, Norway

Coordinates: 69°37′53″N 18°54′35″E

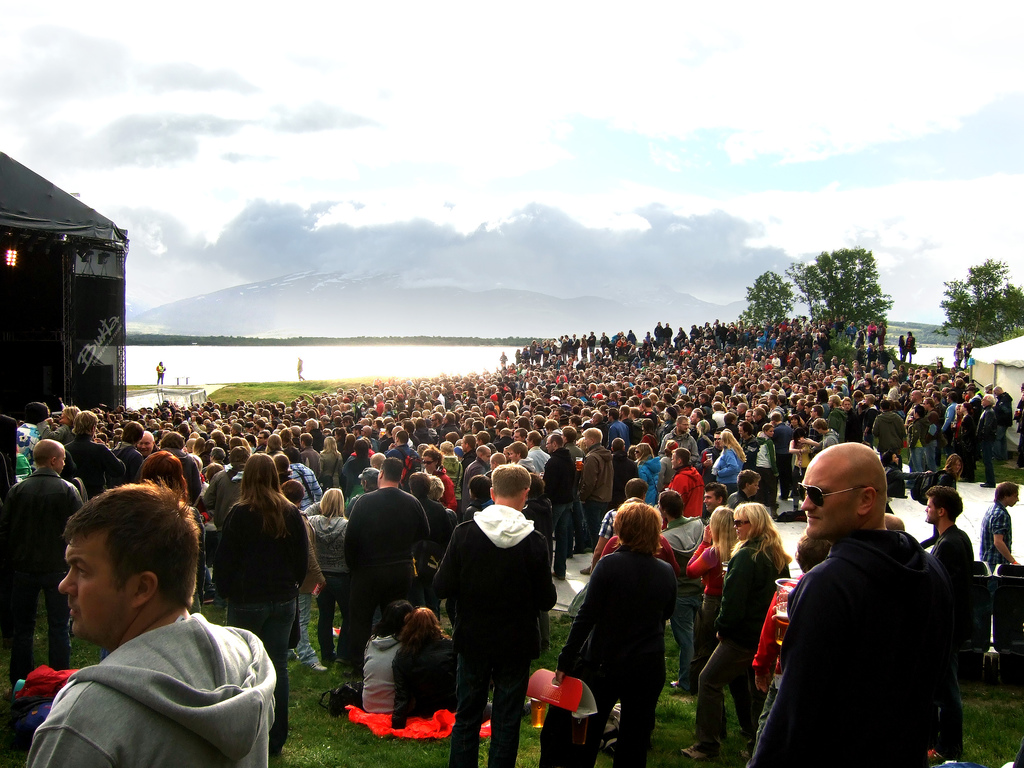
- Genre: Rock music
- Dates: for 2019: 18–20 July
- Locations: Tromsø, Norway
- Years active: 2004 – present
- Founders: Robert Strømmen Dyrnes, Maria Grazia Di Meo (nee Fredheim)
- Website: www.bukta.no

Bukta Tromsø Open Air Festival, commonly abbreviated The Bukta Festival, is an open-air music festival taking place every July in Telegrafbukta, Tromsø, Norway. The festival was first staged in 2004.

== History ==
The festival was first staged in 2004, but its history can be traced back a further two years. In 2002 and 2003 the North of Nowhere festival was arranged in a field near Åsgård, Tromsø. This festival was staffed completely by volunteers, grounded in an ideal of a non-alcoholic, gratis and free for all ages arrangement. In November 2003 North of Nowhere was given the "Rock Festival of the Year" award after a contest held by polling from other Norwegian festivals (festivals belonging to the umbrella organization Norwegian Rock Association). The very same day the idea of a larger festival first saw the light of day, and prior to the Christmas 2003, North of Nowhere was history and Bukta Tromsø Open Air Festival was founded.

At the very first Bukta Festival in 2004 roughly 5,000 attendees got to see Norwegian acts such as Sondre Lerche, Madrugada, Span and BigBang at what was considered the greatest festival success in Tromsø in more than a decade.

2005 dawned with a higher level of ambition, with international acts such as Phoenix (FR), Supersuckers (US) and The Soundtrack of Our Lives (SE) grazing the festival stage. Along with higher profile artists, attendance soared to 11,000 visitors. The very same year, Bukta Tromsø Open Air Festival picked up the gauntlet from North of Nowhere, and was awarded the "Festival of the Year" award.

2006 saw further progression, and the festival was completely sold out a fortnight before the first concert. Some 13,000 attendees got to see among others Motörhead (UK), Danko Jones (CAN), Håkan Hellstrøm (SE), Mew (DK), Kaizers Orchestra, DumDum Boys and Seigmen.

For 2007, the festival was expanded from two to three days, something which enabled the festival directors to book even more acts and further expand the artistic palette of the festival. Some of the attendees will probably remember 2007 as the year Iggy & The Stooges visited Tromsø.

In 2008 the festival added an additional stage, and a total of 28 bands played for a record crowd. With The festival being sold out all three days, more than 20,000 people got to see amongst others Patti Smith (US), Wovenhand (US), Leningrad Cowboys (FI), Kent (SE) and Raga Rockers.

The festival area has a daily capacity of 6000 people, and consists of three stages.

== The Festival Organization ==
Bukta – Tromsø Open Air Festival is a non-profit foundation, with the annual general meeting as the highest authority. The annual general meeting elects the festival board, consisting of a chairperson and four board members. The board is working within the guidelines set by the annual general meeting. The daily administration of the festival consists of three employees – with the festival manager and the producer/marketing director being employed full-time, and a PR officer employed part-time.

The Festival manager at the Bukta Festival is Lasse Lauritz Pettersen.

== Producing the festival ==
Carrying out the Bukta Festival would be impossible without volunteer workers. During the festival in 2008 more than 400 volunteer workers were involved in the festival.

In 2005 The Bukta Festival launched a cooperation with Kafé X of Tromsø. The Kafé X is an organization run by people with former drug problems, offering a variety of cultural and other activities. This cooperation has increased gradually over the last few years, and during the Bukta Festivalen of 2008 more than 50 volunteers from the café made an invaluable contribution.

In addition to the main event of the festival, there has been arranged a free concert with no age limit every Saturday morning. This concert is non-alcoholic and has a "family friendly profile".

Since its inception in 2004 Superfamily, Magnet, Turboneger, Madrugada and HGH have played at the morning concert, in addition to local acts such as Fingerprince, Desert Highway, Vishnu and Turdus Musicus.

== Artists that have performed at Bukta ==
=== Artists 2004 ===
Friday

- (Norway) Hangface
- (Norway) The Kulta Beats
- (Norway) Sondre Lerche
- (Norway) Ricochets
- (Norway) Madrugada
- (Norway) Dread Men Walking

Saturday

- (Norway) The Lites
- (Norway) HGH
- (Norway) The Brimstone Solar Radiation Band
- (Norway) The James Deans
- (Norway) Milestone Refinery
- (Norway) El Caco
- (Norway) Emmerhoff & the Melancholy Babies
- (Norway) SPAN
- (Norway) Sivert Høyem and the Opposition
- (Norway) BigBang

=== Artists 2005 ===
Friday

- (Norway) Cato Salsa Experience
- (Norway) Hopalong Knut
- (Norway) The Beautiful People
- (Norway) Tuco's Lounge
- (Japan) The 5.6.7.8's
- (Finland) 22-Pistepirkko
- (Sweden) The Soundtrack of Our Lives

Saturday

- (Norway) Madrugada
- (Norway) Johanne Ballovarre
- (Norway) Turdus Musicus
- (Norway) Minor Majority
- (Norway) WE
- (Norway) Anneli Drecker
- (United States) Supersuckers
- (Norway) Ralph Myerz & The Jack Herren Band
- (France) Phoenix

=== Artists 2006 ===
Friday

- (Norway) Ricochets
- (United Kingdom) Art Brut
- (Denmark) Baby Woodrose
- (Sweden) Håkan Hellström
- (United Kingdom) Motörhead
- (Norway) Seigmen

Saturday

- (Norway) Turboneger
- (Norway) Vishnu
- (Norway) Kaizers Orchestra
- (United States) Brant Bjork and the Bros
- (Norway) Washington
- (Canada) Danko Jones
- (Denmark) Mew
- (Norway) DumDum Boys

=== Artists 2007 ===
Thursday

- (Norway) Ska Patrol
- (Sweden) The Hives
- (United States) The Thermals
- (United States) Calexico
- (Norway) Turboneger

Friday

- (Norway) Taliban Airways
- (United States) New Bomb Turks
- (United States) Midlake
- (Scotland) (Republic of Ireland) The Waterboys
- (Norway) Bigbang
- (England) Supergrass

Saturday

- (Norway) Magnet
- (Sweden) Johnossi
- (Norway) Desert Highway
- (Norway) Sivert Høyem & The Volunteers
- (Norway) Brut Boogaloo
- (Republic of Ireland) Ash
- (United States) Iggy Pop & The Stooges

=== Artists 2008 ===
Thursday

- (Finland) Leningrad Cowboys
- (United States) Wovenhand
- (United States) Patti Smith
- (Norway) DumDum Boys
- (Italy) The Mojomatics
- (Norway) The Box of Mothers
- (Norway) The Disciplines

Friday

- (Norway) Raga Rockers
- (Norway) The Grand
- (United States) Two Gallants
- (Canada) Danko Jones
- (Norway) Madrugada
- (United States) Tim Scott
- (Netherlands) Sixtyniners
- (United Kingdom) The Vibrators
- (Norway) Los Plantronics

Saturday

- (Norway) Superfamily
- (Norway) Fingerprince
- (Norway) The Jessica Fletchers
- (Norway) Destined
- (Norway) Dozza & The Dragonslayers
- (Norway) Åge Aleksandersen og Sambandet
- (United States) The Fuckemos
- (United States) Legendary Shack Shakers
- (Sweden) Kent
- (Sweden) Hellsongs
- (Norway) Bigton Gulch Town Orchestra
- (Norway) Cyaneed

=== Artists 2009 ===
Thursday

- (Sweden) bob hund
- (Canada) The Sadies
- (Norway) Motorpsycho
- (United Kingdom) Kaiser Chiefs
- (Norway) The Considerate Lovers
- (Norway) El Cuero
- (Netherlands) Peter Pan Speedrock

Friday

- (Norway) deLillos
- (United States) Mark Olson & Gary Louris
- (United Kingdom) The Wombats
- (United States) Roky Erickson
- (Norway) The Revolt
- (United States) Muck & the Mires
- (United Kingdom) Sham 69
- (Norway) Tommy Tokyo & Starving for My Gravy

Saturday

- (Norway) Bare Egil Band
- (Norway) Real Ones
- (Norway) Jackie Moonshine
- (Norway) Same Lime
- (Sweden) Moneybrother
- (United States) Eagles of Death Metal
- (United Kingdom) Ray Davies
- (Norway) Dull Boy Jack
- (United States) Joe Pug
- (Norway) Major Parkinson

=== Artists 2010 ===
Thursday

- (Norway) BigBang
- (Norway) Disciplines
- (United States) The Sonics
- (Denmark) Mew
- (Norway) Kråkesølv
- (Norway) Navigators
- (United States) Hayseed Dixie

Friday

- (Canada) Danko Jones
- (Norway) John Olav Nilsen & Gjengen
- (United Kingdom) Jim Jones Revue
- (Norway) Datarock
- (United States) Dinosaur Jr.
- (Norway) The Hex
- (United Kingdom) Let's Wrestle
- (Norway) Tellusalie
- (United States) Mondo Generator

Saturday

- (Norway) The BlackSheeps
- (Norway) Moddi
- (Norway) Hurra Torpedo
- (Norway) Mining in Yukon
- (Norway) Jabba the But
- (Norway) Bits 'n Pieces
- (Norway) Hellbillies
- (United States) Clutch
- (United States) Juliette Lewis
- (Norway) Sivert Høyem
- (Norway) Bad County
- (Sweden) Ingenting
- (Norway) Turdus Musicus

=== Artists 2011 ===
Thursday

- (Norway) Ida Maria
- (Norway) Kitchie Kitchie Ki Me O
- (United States) Monster Magnet
- (Australia) Grinderman
- (Norway) Death by Unga Bunga
- (Norway) Cold Mailman
- (Japan) Guitar Wolf
- (Norway) Magne Neby Olsen
- (Norway) Petter Carlsen

Friday

- (Norway) Doctor Midnight & The Mercy Cult
- (United Kingdom) Two Door Cinema Club
- (United States) The Black Lips
- (United States) Mudhoney
- (United States) The Dandy Warhols
- (Norway) Badger
- (Norway) Neograss
- (Norway) Surfers Lingo
- (United Kingdom) UK Subs
- (Norway) Kvelertak
- (Norway) Ingeborg Oktober

Saturday

- (Norway) Steinar Albrigtsen
- (Norway) Kråkesølv
- (Norway) Olgas Amazon
- (Norway) The Wolves
- (Sweden) Melissa Horn
- (United Kingdom) Gallows
- (United States) Kyuss Lives!
- (United Kingdom) Biffy Clyro
- (Norway) The Pussycats
- (Denmark) Nekromantix
- (Norway) Honningbarna
- (Norway) Vishnu
- (Norway) Lisa Skoglund
- (Norway) The Northern Lies
- (Norway) Eline Thorp

=== Artists 2012 ===
Thursday

- (Sweden) Lars Winnerbäck
- (Sweden) Daniel Norgren
- (Norway) Æ
- (Sweden) Graveyard
- (United States) The Real McKenzies
- (United States) She Keeps Bees
- (Sweden) The Cardigans

Friday

- (Republic of Ireland) Thin Lizzy
- (Mexico) Los Explosivos
- (Norway) The Considerate Lovers
- (United States) The Jayhawks
- (Norway) The South
- (Norway) Vidar Vang
- (United States) Lissie
- (Norway) Thee Mono Sapiens
- (Norway) Mara & The Inner Strangeness
- (United States) Rival Sons
- (Sweden) The Nomads
- (United States) Dirt Daubers
- (Norway) Sivert Høyem

Saturday

- (Norway) Violet Road
- (Norway) Jack Stillwater
- (Norway) Moddi
- (Norway) Stein Torleif Bjella
- (United States) Legendary Shack Shakers
- (Canada) The Burning Hell
- (Australia) Wolfmother
- (Norway) Erter, Kjøtt og Flesk
- (Norway) Peter Estdahl
- (Norway) Åge Aleksandersen & Sambandet

=== Artists 2013 ===
Thursday

- (Sweden) Ulf Lundell
- (Sweden) The Tallest Man on Earth
- (Norway) BigBang
- (Norway) Oslo Ess
- (Germany) Kadavar
- (United States) Terry Lee Hale
- (Norway) Jadudah
- (Norway) Red Headed Sluts
- (Norway) Honningbarna

Friday

- (Norway) CC Cowboys
- (United States) The Dream Syndicate
- (Norway) Kvelertak
- (Sweden) The Hives
- (Norway) Nikkeby Lufthavn
- (England) The Pretty Things
- (Sweden) Witchcraft
- (Norway) H!DE
- (Norway) The Bonbons
- (United States) (Denmark) (Germany) Reverend Shine Snake Oil Company
- (Norway) Hjerterå
- (Norway) Kråkesølv

Saturday

- (Norway) Pristine
- (Norway) Ida Jenshus
- (Norway) Adjentist
- (Norway) Monolith House
- (Norway) Håkon Johnsen Trio

Saturday evening

- (Norway) Hekla Stålstrenga
- (United States) Calexico
- (Sweden) Shining
- (Norway) Kaizers Orchestra
- (Norway) Atlanter
- (Norway) Christer Wulff
- (England) Uncle Acid & the Deadbeats
- (Norway) Blòt
- (Norway) Pistol & Bart
- (Norway) The Mobsmen
- (Norway) THe Launderettes
- (Norway) The Good The Bad and The Zugly

NOFI-stage

- (Norway) Mara & The Inner Strangeness

=== Artists 2014 ===
Thursday

- (Sweden) Opeth
- (Norway) Skambankt
- (United States) Patti Smith
- (Norway) Billie Van
- (Norway) The Dogs
- (Norway) Approaching Pluto
- (Norway) Kindred Fever
- (Norway) Ondt Blod
- (England) Gallows

Friday

- (Norway) Mari Boine
- (United States) The Bronx
- (United States) The Jon Spencer Blues Explosion
- (United States) Dropkick Murphys
- (Norway) Spidergawd
- (United States) Pentagram
- (Norway) Biru Baby Biru Baby formerly known as Cyaneed
- (Norway) Reptile Master
- (Norway) Barren Womb
- (Norway) Løkbrød
- (Norway) Phone Joan
- (United States) Brave Black Sea

Saturday

- (Norway) Jadudah
- (Norway) Lillebjørn Nilsen & Seresta
- (Norway) Carolina & Louisa
- (Norway) Resirkulert
- (Norway) 10th Harmonic
- (Norway) Disco Fiasco

Saturday evening

- (United States) The War on Drugs
- (Norway) Kåre & The Cavemen
- (Sweden) Imperial State Electric
- (United States) Mastodon
- (Norway) Monica Heldal
- (Norway) The Cheaters
- (Sweden) Skogen Brinner
- (Norway) Février
- (Norway) Pil & Bue
- (Norway) The Late Great
- (Norway) Roadburn
- (Sweden) Horisont

=== Artists 2015 ===
Thursday

- (Canada) Danko Jones
- (Norway) (Sweden) Brutus
- (Norway) Heave Blood & Die
- (Norway) Onkel P & De Fjerne Slektningene
- (Sweden) Hurula
- (England) The Graveltones
- (United States) Dream Theater

Friday

- (Sweden) Daniel Norgren
- (Denmark) Baby in Vain
- (Germany) Wedge
- (United States) The Growlers
- (Norway) Fru Pedersen
- (United States) Dienamic
- (England) Temples avlyst
- (Norway) The Late Great
- (Sweden) Hypnos
- (Norway) Vederkast
- (United States) Rival Sons

Saturday

- (Norway) Lüt
- (Norway) As Life Fades Away
- (Norway) Ska Patrol
- (Norway) Screenshot This
- (Norway) How To Kiss A Frog
- (Norway) Razika

Saturday evening

- (United States) Jonathan Wilson
- (Norway) Torgeir Waldemar
- (Norway) The Northern Belle
- (United States) Chuck Prophet & The Mission Express
- (Denmark) Hjortene
- (Sweden) Vidunder
- (Sweden) Refused
- (Norway) The Devil & The Almighty Blues
- (Norway) Changeling
- (England) The Wombats

=== Artists 2016 ===
Thursday

- (United States) Gogol Bordello
- (Norway) Bendik
- (Norway) Hubro
- (Norway) Kvelertak
- (Australia) Cosmic Psychos
- (Norway) Ohmwork
- (United States) Iggy Pop

Friday

- (Norway) Sondre Justad
- (Sweden) Greenleaf
- (Norway) Sunshine Reverberation
- (France) Gojira
- (Norway) Sugarfoot
- (Norway) Robaat
- (Sweden) Graveyard
- (Norway) Karlsøy Prestegaard
- (Norway) Kumle og Raspeball
- (United States) Zappa plays Zappa

Saturday

- (Norway) Auto Pilots
- (Norway) The Late Band
- (Norway) The Northern Lies
- (Norway) Mama Said No
- (Norway) Martine B & The Classy Llamas
- (Norway) Black Debbath

Saturday evening

- (Norway) Valentourettes
- (Norway) Jacco Gardner
- (Norway) Gebhardt
- (Norway) Senjahopen
- (Sweden) Monolord
- (Norway) Ondt Blod
- (Norway) Raga Rockers
- (Canada) Cancer Bats
- (Italy) There Will Be Blood
- (Norway) DumDum Boys

=== Artists 2017 ===
- 10th Harmonic
- Alice Cooper
- Ane Brun
- Anneli Drecker
- Bitches Brew
- Child
- Converge
- De Press
- Ebbot Lundberg & The Indigo Children
- Elder
- Frank Carter & The Rattlesnakes
- Green Lake
- Hedvig Mollestad Trio
- Highasakite
- Honningbarna
- Jabba
- King Buffalo
- Kryp
- Lüt
- Midnight Choir
- Motorpsycho
- PsychoSaints
- Quarter Wolf
- Resirkulert
- Ron Gallo
- Seigmen
- Stein Torleif Bjella
- Sunshine Reverberation
- The Bonnevilles
- The Fat Rats
- The Late Great
- The Modern Times
- The Mystery Lights
- Turboneger
- Union Carbide Productions
- Unknown Composer

=== Artists 2018 ===
- A Million Pineapples
- Backstreet Girls
- Barren Womb
- Bel Canto
- Castro
- Dwarves
- Franska Trion
- Gluecifer
- Gypsy Chicken
- Heave Blood and Die
- Hollow Hearts
- Jabba
- Jadudah
- Kevin Morby
- Koritsa
- Kosmik Boogie Tribe
- Kryp
- Lisa Skoglund
- Metz
- Moddi
- Nick Oliveri`s Death Electric
- Norsk Råkk
- Regnvær
- Rust
- Samsara Blues Experiment
- Shame
- Sivert Høyem
- Skambankt
- Slowdive
- Sondre Justad
- Sunshine Reverberation
- Television
- The Cameltoes
- Thee Mono Sapiens
- The Hellacopters
- The Modern Times
- Thåström
- Turdus Musicus
- Årabrot
