= Hove Festival =

Norwegian music festival

- Genre: Indie, pop, metal, hip hop, electronic music
- Dates: 2 – 5 July (2013)
- Locations: Tromøya, Arendal, Norway
- Coordinates: 58°26′33″N 8°50′50″E
- Years active: 2007 – 2014
- Founders: Toffen Gunnufsen (2007 – 2008) Melvin Benn 2009 –
- Website: www.hovefestival.com

The Hove Festival (Norwegian: Hovefestivalen) was a music festival held on the island Tromøya outside of Arendal in southern Norway. It was held for the first time from 26 to 30 June 2007. Running for eight years and at one time the largest music festival in Norway, Hove Festival was discontinued after its 2014 show due to running a loss. Hove Festival was acquired by Festival Republic in 2008 after going bankrupt. As with other Festival Republic events, there were no age restrictions, and children under the age of 12 were admitted free of charge.

Hove strove to be an environmentally neutral festival, both buying carbon offset quotes for all power and transportation used during and prior to the festival, and sorting and recycling all trash produced by the event. Preparation for the festival relied heavily on volunteer work. In 2010 there were a total of 2,500 people volunteering for security, stage hand, drivers, kitchen duty and post-festival cleanup.

Hove consisted of several different areas such as the camp area, festival area and "zero" area. The camp held up to 10,000 campers and was open throughout the festival. The festival area, including the shopping street, was open to everyone who had a day bracelet or festival bracelet. The zero area, which has several fast-food shops, was open to everyone with or without bracelet.

The festival had three main performance stages: Hovescenen, Amfiscenen and Teltscenen (tent stage), with Hovescenen being the largest. One of the more prominent acts at Hovescenen was Muse in 2010.

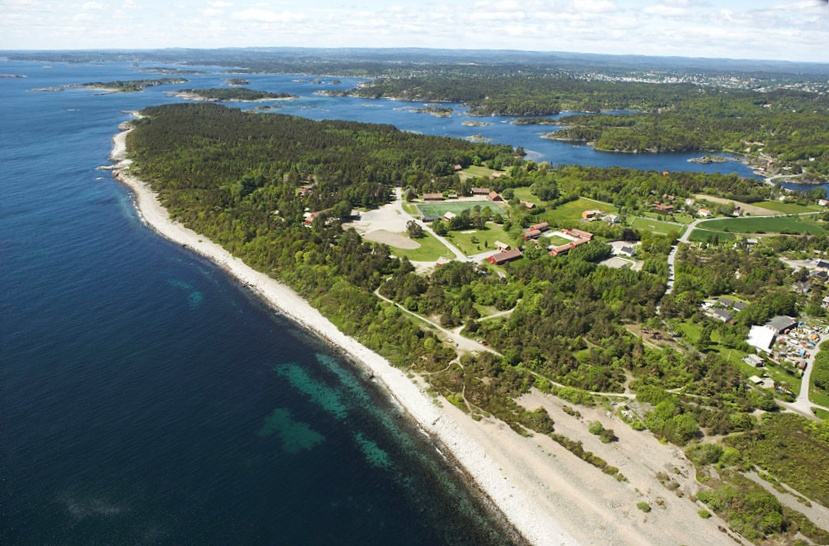
Hove area

Main stage

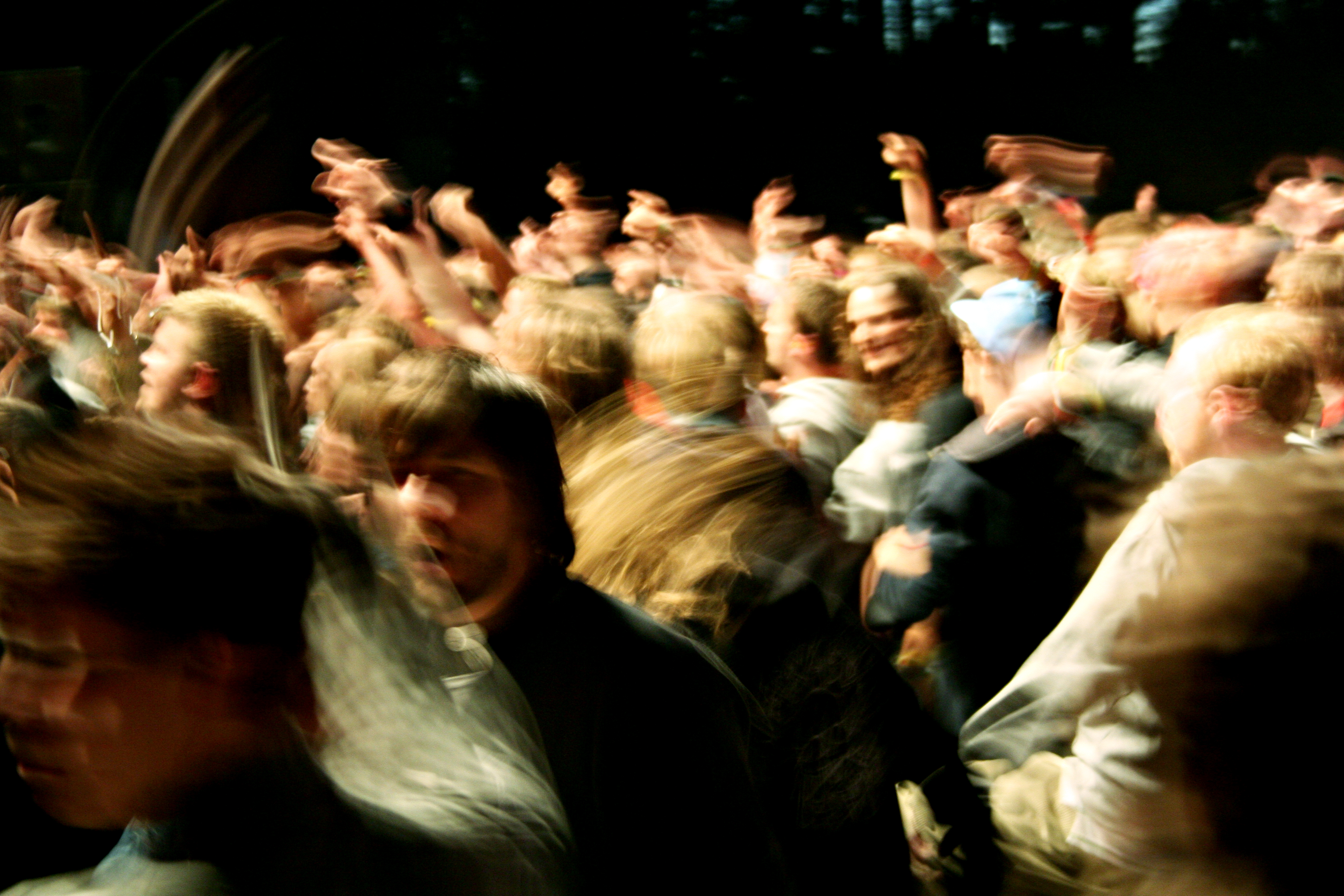
Hatebreed circlepit 2007

== 2007 ==
In 2007 there were 72,000 visitors and 53,000 sold tickets, which included 7,700 week passes, making this Norway's largest music festival of the year.

Program 2007

Tuesday 26 June

- Hovescenen:
  - Queens of the Stone Age / Incubus / CSS / My Midnight Creeps / Hangface
- Amfiscenen:
  - Amy Winehouse / Clipse / Stephen Marley / Darkside of the Force
- Amfiscenen, klubb:
  - Kaiser Chiefs / King Midas
- Teltscenen:
  - Klaxons / The Twang / 65daysofstatic / Junior Boys / Sunkissed

Wednesday 27 June

"In southern Norway the sun only sets for two hours," noted Brandon Flowers of The Killers. "We headlined and we came off just as it was getting dark. We dried off and I sent to see Bright Eyes at 1am, just as it was getting light. That was incredibly moving."

- Hovescenen:
  - The Killers / Arcade Fire / The Hold Steady / Me First and the Gimme Gimmes / X-Queen of the Astronauts
- Amfiscenen:
  - Lamb of God / Chimaira / Unearth / Gojira / Dimension F3H
- Amfiscenen, klubb:
  - Bright Eyes / Susanne Sundfør
- Teltscenen:
  - The View / The Noisettes / The New Violators / Bite / Sunkissed

Thursday 28 June

- Hovescenen:
  - Dipset (with Jim Jones and Juelz Santana) / Chamillionaire / Ludacris / Papoose / Akala / Venom
- Amfiscenen:
  - Interpol / TV on the Radio / 120 Days / Tokyo Police Club
- Amfiscenen, klubb:
  - Neurosis / Hatebreed / She Said Destroy
- Teltscenen:
  - Oh No Ono / The Presets / The Lionheart Brothers / Brightblack Morning Light / Sunkissed

Friday 29 June

- Hovescenen:
  - Slayer / Cynic / Keep of Kalessin
- Amfiscenen:
  - Damien Rice / Nellie McKay / Pleasure / Ingrid Olava / Mastodon
- Amfiscenen, klubb:
  - Omar / Remy Ma
- Teltscenen:
  - The Long Blondes / 1990s / Moving Oos / Violent Years / Sunkissed

Saturday 30 June

- Hovescenen:
  - My Chemical Romance / Billy Talent / Flying Crap / Pale Kids
- Amfiscenen:
  - Sivert Høyem & The Volunteers / Modest Mouse / William Hut / Heroes & Zeroes
- Amfiscenen, klubb:
  - Gossip / The Horrors
- Teltscenen:
  - Devastations / Patrick Wolf / Rockettothesky / Kate Hanevik / Sunkissed

== 2008 ==
23 – 27 June 2008, lineup:

- Animal Collective
- Avenged Sevenfold
- Bad Religion
- Band of Horses
- Baroness
- Beck
- Black Kids
- Black Lips
- Black Tide
- The Brian Jonestown Massacre
- Coheed and Cambria
- Converge
- The Cool Kids
- Deerhunter
- Dengue Fever
- Flogging Molly
- Ghostland Observatory
- Hercules and Love Affair
- Howlin' Rain
- Jaguar Love
- Jay-Z
- Job For A Cowboy
- The Raconteurs
- Rival Schools
- Saigon
- ~~Santogold~~ cancelled
- Killswitch Engage
- Panic! at the Disco
- Pase Rock
- Lupe Fiasco
- Les Savy Fav
- MGMT
- Shape of Broad Minds
- St. Vincent
- The Used
- Vampire Weekend
- White Rabbits
- Yeasayer
- The Pigeon Detectives
- Scaramanga Six
- ~~Simian Mobile Disco~~ cancelled
- The Ting Tings*
- Wild Beasts
- The Wombats
- Blood Red Shoes
- Goldfrapp
- Chrome Hoof
- The Count & Sinden
- Bullet for My Valentine
- ~~Babyshambles~~ cancelled
- Duffy
- Foals
- Joe Lean And The Jing Jang Jong
- The Kooks
- ~~M.I.A~~ cancelled
- Neon Neon
- ~~Crystal Castles~~ cancelled
- Black Mountain
- MSTRKRFT
- Stars
- ~~Opeth~~ cancelled
- In Flames
- Hellacopters
- Slagsmålsklubben
- Familjen
- Cavalera Conspiracy
- Mixhell
- Surkin
- The Teenagers
- Boys Noize
- Midnight Juggernauts
- Primordial
- Det Er Jag Som Är Döden
- Dimmu Borgir
- Don Juan Dracula
- Animal Alpha
- Audrey Horne
- Charlotte & The Co-Stars
- Name
- The National Bank
- Necessary Intergalactic Cooperation
- Sigh & Explode
- Silje Nes
- Skatebård
- Taliban Airways
- Thom Hell
- Tommy Tokyo & Starving For My Gravy
- The Generous Days
- Ida Maria (replacement for M.I.A)
- Ingrid Olava
- Lukestar
- Magne F
- Matias Tellez
- Pirate Love
- Purified in Blood
- Satyricon (replacement for Opeth)
- ~~Kim Hiorthøy~~ cancelled
- Truls and the Trees
- Turdus Musicus
- Ungdomskulen
- We
- Zerozonic
- Ladyhawke
- Behemoth
- Bloody Beetroots
- * Ended prematurely due to safety reasons. The venue was overloaded, leaving the floor severely damaged.

== 2009 ==
22 – 25 June 2008, lineup:

- Parkway Drive
- Montée
- Fjorden Baby!
- I Was A King
- Casiokids
- The New Wine
- Benea Reach
- Crookers
- M83
- Yuksek
- The Prodigy
- Bring Me the Horizon
- Esser
- Metronomy
- Fujiya & Miyagi
- Franz Ferdinand (headliner)
- White Lies
- The Ting Tings
- Our Fold
- Black Dahlia Murder
- Hockey
- Q-Tip
- Slipknot (headliner)
- Disturbed
- The Killers (headliner)
- The Gaslight Anthem
- All That Remains
- Fleet Foxes
- Eagles of Death Metal
- Faith No More (headliner)

== 2010 ==
29 June – 2 July lineup

- Empire of the Sun
- Pendulum
- Muse (headliner)
- Gallows
- Massive Attack (headliner)
- Ellie Goulding
- Dizzee Rascal
- Florence and the Machine
- Kvelertak
- Kråkesølv
- Serena Maneesh
- Anne Marie Almedal
- Navigators
- Fuck Buttons
- Moddi
- Social Suicide
- Shot At Dawn
- JJ
- Brodinski
- Biffy Clyro
- Heaven Shall Burn
- Arcade Fire (headliner)
- Japandroids
- Alexisonfire
- Them Crooked Vultures (headliner)
- The Antlers
- The Drums
- Paramore
- As I Lay Dying
- Every Time I Die
- Atreyu
- A Day to Remember
- Kendrick Lamar
- Snoop Dogg
- Skrillex
- Knife party
- Vampire Weekend
- Nas & Damian Marley
- Our Fold
- Two Door Cinema Club
- Julian Casablancas

== 2011 ==
28 June – 1 July lineup

- The Strokes - (headliner)
- deadmau5
- Linkin Park - (headliner)
- Thirty Seconds to Mars
- Robyn - (headliner)
- The Vaccines
- Carte Blanche
- Kasabian
- Big Boi
- Honningbarna
- The Mars Volta
- Gold Panda
- Jesse Jones
- Kylesa
- Anna Calvi
- All Time Low
- Turns
- Tinie Tempah
- John Olav Nilsen & Gjengen
- Bright Eyes
- Jimmy Eat World
- Young Dreams
- Razika
- Jenny & Johnny
- Classixx
- Toro Y Moi
- Salvador Sánchez
- Tame Impala
- Brandon Flowers
- Kaizers Orchestra - (headliner)
