= Göta Lejon =

Theatre and cinema building in Stockholm, Sweden

Coordinates: 59°18′49″N 18°04′24″E

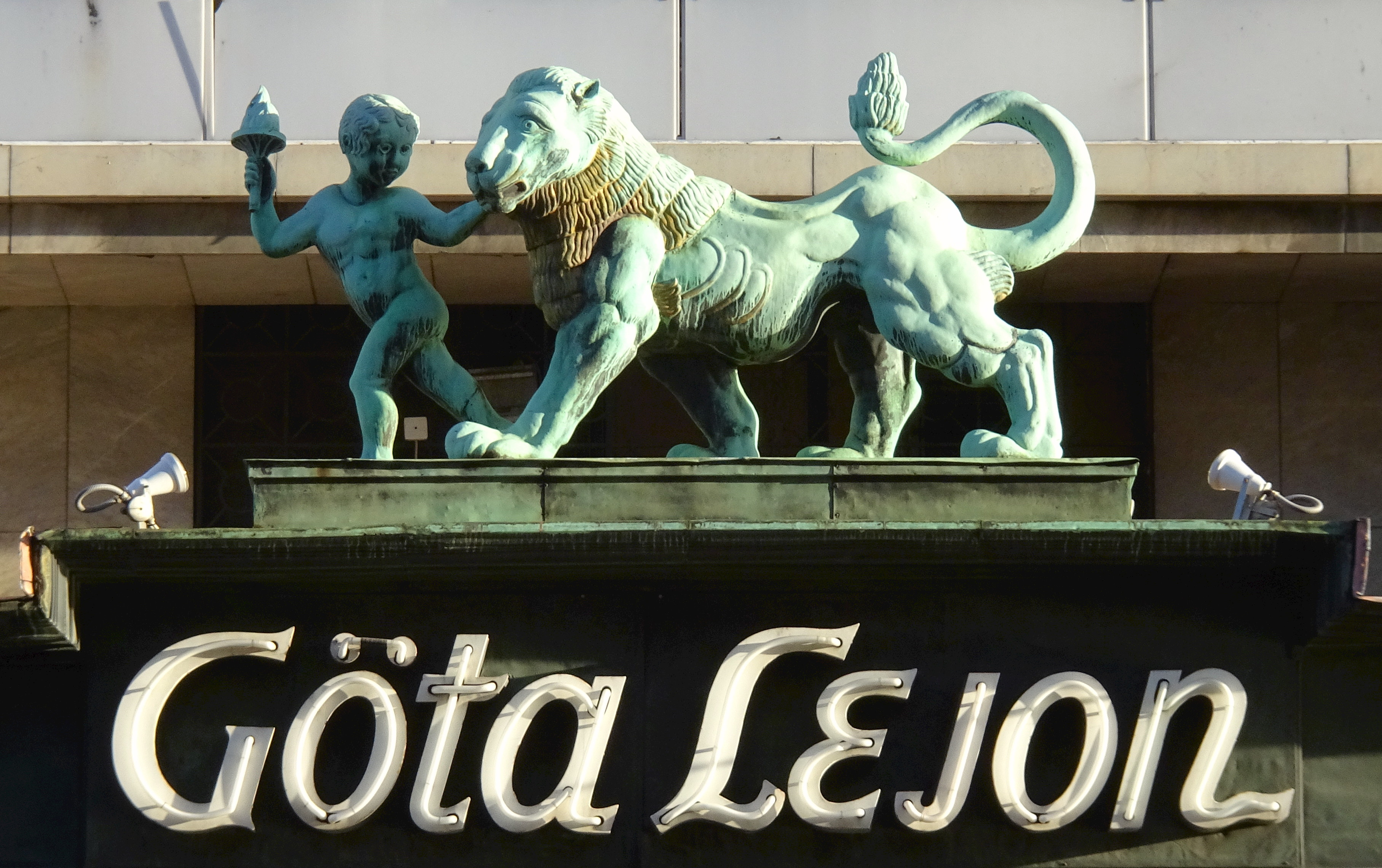
Copper lion above the entrance

Göta Lejon is a theatre located at 55 Götgatan in the district of Södermalm in Stockholm, Sweden.

== History ==
Göta Lejon (Gothic Lion) was built in the years 1926–1928 according to drawings by architect Birger Borgström. (1890–1964). Architecturally, the house has a block-long plaster facade with modernism on the basis of neoclassicalism. The entrance has a canopy covered with copper plate crowned with a copper lion by Einar Forseth (1892–1988) who also decorated the salon. The building was decorated with stucco work by Nils Enberg (1893–1959) and Carl Elmberg (1889–1955).

It opened as a cinema in 1928, with the last movie at the venue in the 1980s. Since the 1990s, it has been a theatre, especially known for musical productions. Among the productions at Göta Lejon, the Swedish versions of High School Musical, Buddy: The Buddy Holly Musical, The Sound of Music, Jesus Christ Superstar and Priscilla, Queen of the Desert have been successfully played.

Up until 2008 it was owned by the Swedish musical production company Proscenia AB, now merged with 3 Sagas which is also the current owner of the Maximteatern theatre in Stockholm.

== Artists who have performed at Göta Lejon ==
- 1977: UFO (26.4.1977), Rush (8.6.1977), Ultravox (20.10.1977), The Runaways (22.11.1977)
- 1978: The Sweet (15.2.1978), Bo Diddley (8.3.1978), Talking Heads (14.6.1978), Elvis Costello & The Attractions (10.7.1978), The Boomtown Rats (10.8.1978), AC/DC (11.10.1978), Rory Gallagher (30.10.1978), Ian Dury & The Blockheads (14.11.1978), Peter Tosh (28.11.1978)
- 1979: City Boy (18.1.1979), Suzi Quatro (8.2.1979), Cheap Trick (28.2.1979), Southside Johnny & The Asbury Jukes (19.10.1979), John Hiatt (19.10.1979), UFO (5.12.1979), U.K. (6.12.1979)
- 1980: Ulf Lundell (21.1.1980), Ellen Foley (19.2.1980), Uriah Heep (28.3.1980), Stiff Little Fingers (18.4.1980), Madness (5.6.1980), Pretenders (10.6.1980), The J. Geils Band (18.6.1980), Ramones (28.8.1980), Scorpions (10.9.1980), Def Leppard (10.9.1980), Nina Hagen (11.9.1980), The Undertones (14.9.1980), Yellow Magic Orchestra (24.10.1980), Madness (3.11.1980), Steve Hackett (12.11.1980), AC/DC (20.11.1980), Whitesnake (20.11.1980), The Jam (25 & 26.11.1980), Ulf Lundell (22.12.1980)
- 1981: Whitesnake (7 .5.1981), Ian Hunter (10.8.1981), B.B. King (15.9.1981), Iron Maiden (8.9.1981), Grace Jones (29.9.1981), Ramones (27.10.1981), ZZ Top (2.10.1981), UB40 (28.10.1981)
- 1983: Lustans Lakejer (30.1.1983), Culture Club (7.4.1983), Orchestral Manoeuvres in the Dark (8.4.1983)
- 1984: Europe (5.4.1984), Uli Jon Roth (5.10.1984), Level 42 (18.10.1984), Big Country (14. & 15.11.1984), Marillion (19.11.1984), The Firm (29.11.1984), Tank (12.12.1984), Metallica (12.12.1984)
- 1985: Indochine (17. & 18.4.1985), Echo & the Bunnymen (29.4.1985), Uriah Heep (6.5.1985), Bon Jovi (15 .5.1985), Yngwie Malmsteen (24.5.1985), Imperiet (19. & 20.12.1985)
- 1986: Imperiet (7. & 8.1.1986), Johnny Winter (15.1.1986), Eldkvarn (4.4.1980), Matt Bianco (8.4.1986), The Cramps (10.4.1986), King Diamond (16.5.1986)
- 1987: Manowar (29 .5.1987), Stryper (2.6.1987)
- 1988: Chaka Khan (11.11.1988), Roxette (21.–24.1988), Michelle Shocked (5.12.1988), Billy Bragg (5.12.1988)
- 1989: Nitzer Ebb (10.2.1989, Mike + the Mechanics (2.3.1989), IQ (2.3.1989), Manowar (4.4.1989), Drifter (4.4.1989), Motörhead (9.4.1989), Noiseworks (18.5.1989), R.E.M. (6.6.1989)
- 1999: Henry Rollins (16.11.1999)
- 2001: Henry Rollins (15.5.2001), Suzanne Vega (3.7.2001)
- 2002: Stefan Sundström (11.2.2002), Conway Savage (2.9.2002), 16 Horsepower (2.9.2002), Last Days of April (7.9.2002)
- 2004: Steve Vai (16.6.2004), Joe Satriani (16.6.2004), Robert Fripp (16.6.2004), Anna Ternheim (29.11., 30.11., 6.12. & 7.12.2004)
- 2008: Tomas Andersson Wij (5.3.2008), Jennie Abrahamson (5.3.2008), Ane Brun (9.4.2008), Blackmore's Night (3.6.2008)
- 2013: Mando Diao (7.2.2013)
- 2014: Cat Power (3.11.2014), Daniel Norgren (12.11.2014), Bill Wyman's Rhythm Kings (2.12.2014)
- 2015: Joshua Radin (30.4.2015), Cary Brothers (30.4.2015), The Tarantula Waltz (28. & 29.6.2015), The Tallest Man on Earth (28. & 29.6.2015), Mina Tindle (13.9.2015), Sufjan Stevens (13.9.2015), Daniel Norgren (28.10.2015), Steve Earle & The Dukes (3.11.2015), Ulf Lundell (24.11., 25.11. & 31.12.2015)
- 2016: Henry Rollins (31.1.2016), Manfred Mann's Earth Band (1.2.2016)
- 2017: Conor Oberst (24.1.2017), Elvis Costello (22.2.2017), Daniel Norgren (10.4.2017), Petter (25.4.2017), Parliament-Funkadelic (8.5.2017), Patti Austin (12.11.2017), Diego el Cigala (15.11.2017)
- 2018: Magnus Carlson (15.2.2018), The Blind Boys of Alabama (9.4.2018), Eva Dahlgren (6.5.2018), Imogen Heap (8.9.2018), Frou Frou (8.9.2018), Passenger (22.9.2018), Magnus Uggla (10.11.2018)
- 2019: Magnus Uggla (1.2.2019), Yann Tiersen (24.2.2019), Magnus Uggla (1.3.2019), Manfred Mann's Earth Band (5.3.2019), Bill Callahan (12.10.2019), Le Mystère des voix bulgares (19.10.2019), Lisa Gerrard (19.10.2019), Michael Kiwanuka (30.11.2019)
- 2020: City and Colour (19.2.2020), Magnus Uggla (22.2.2020)

== Gallery ==
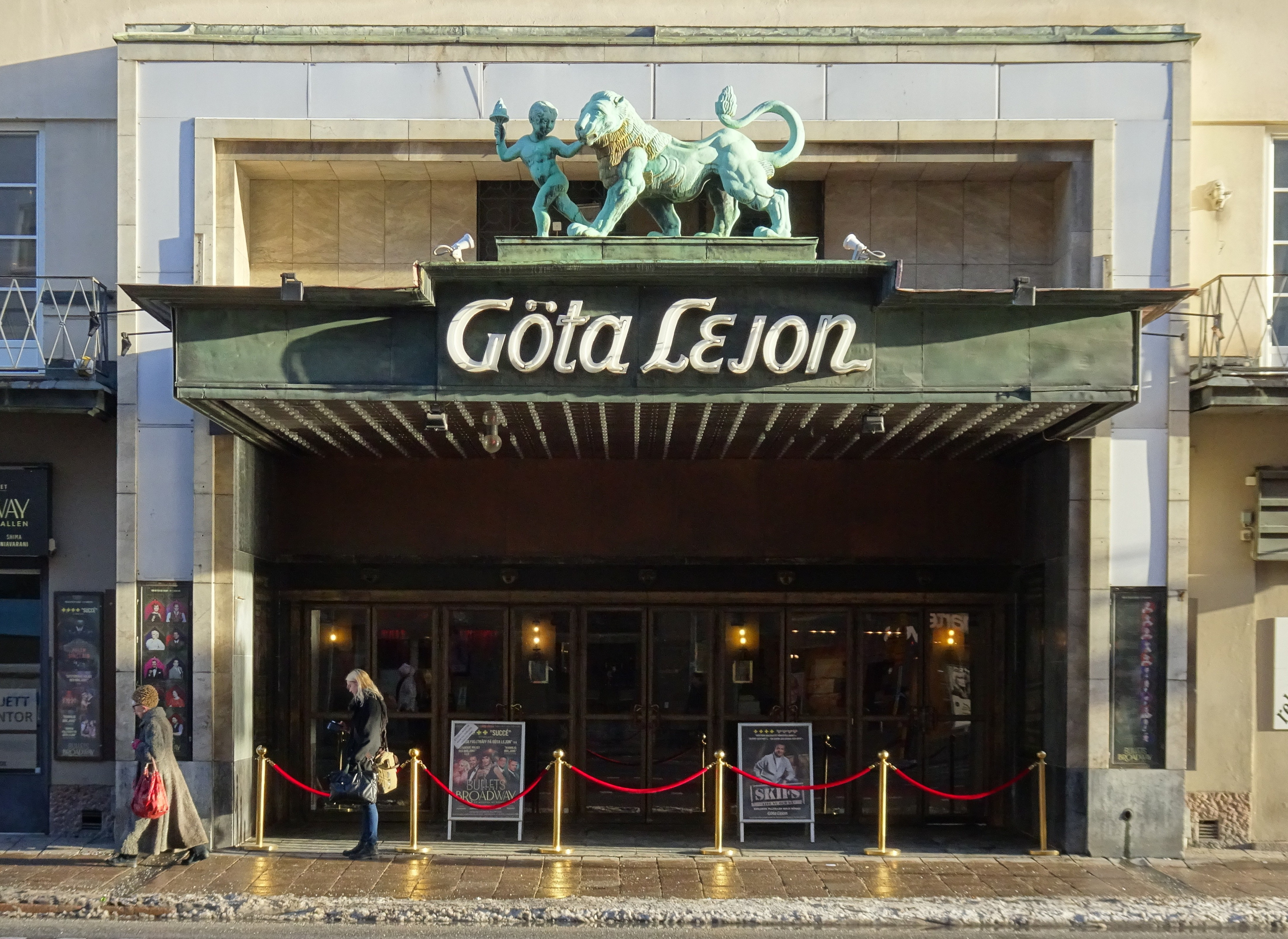

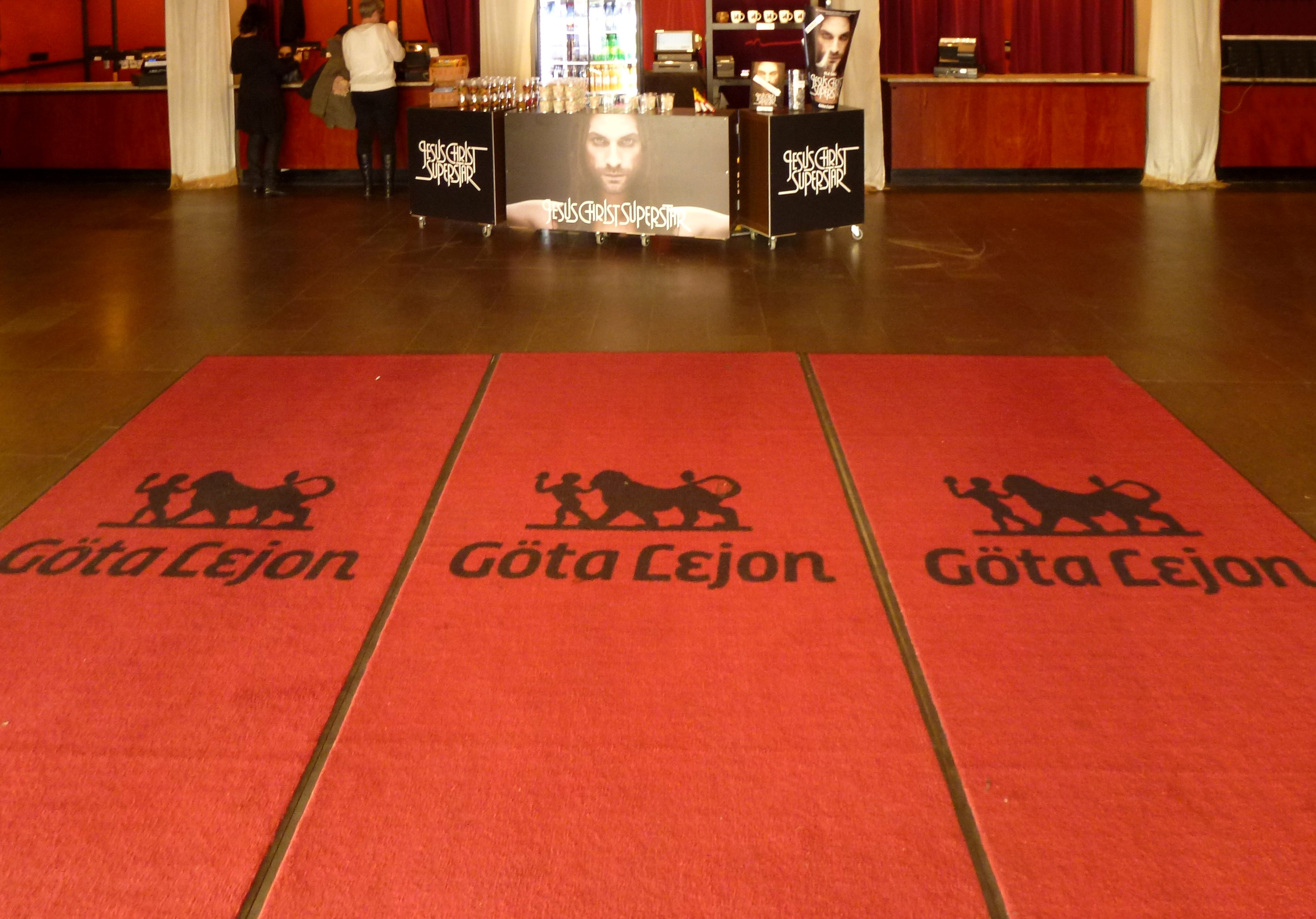

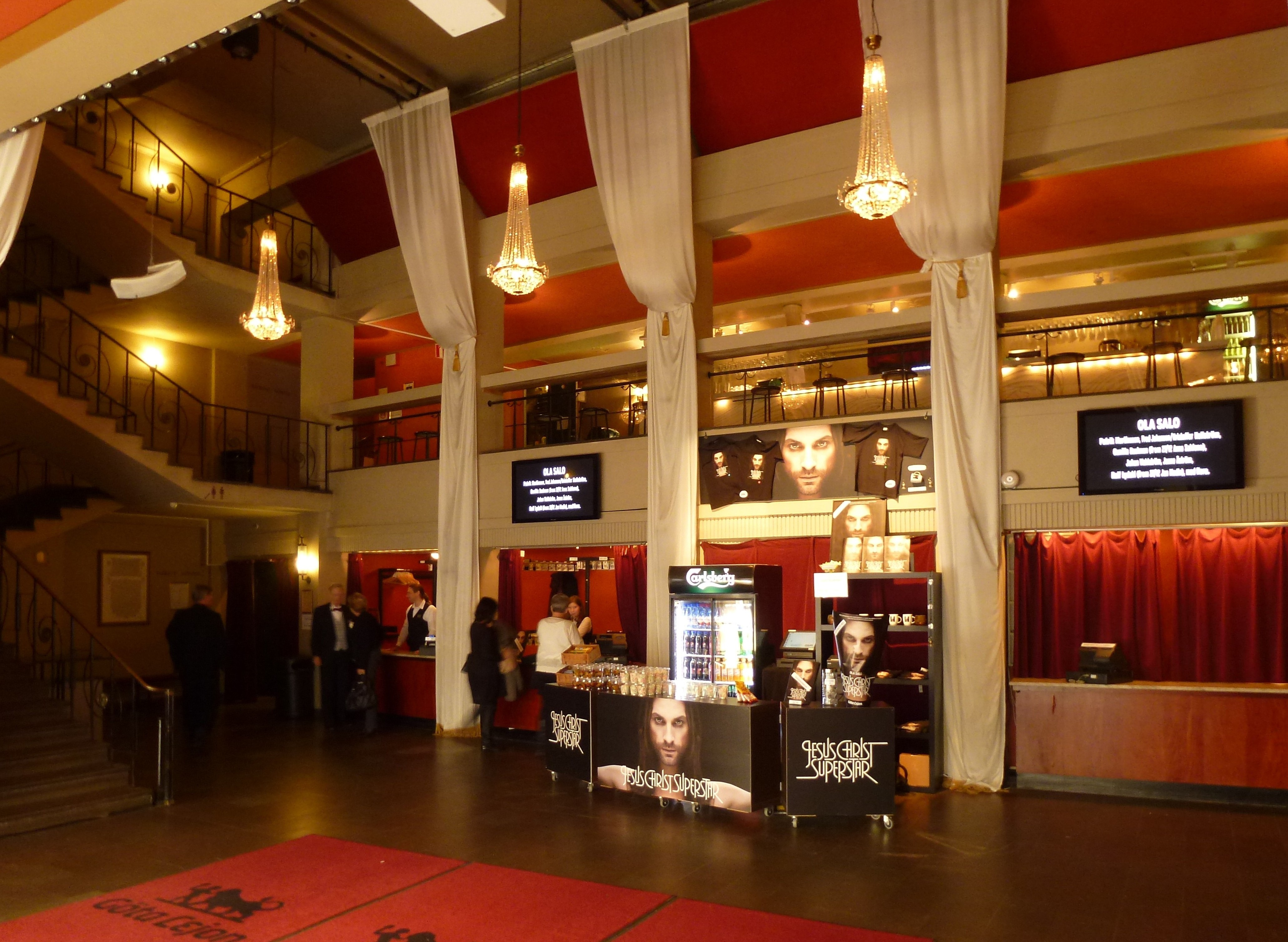
