= Disaster In The Universe =

Norwegian band

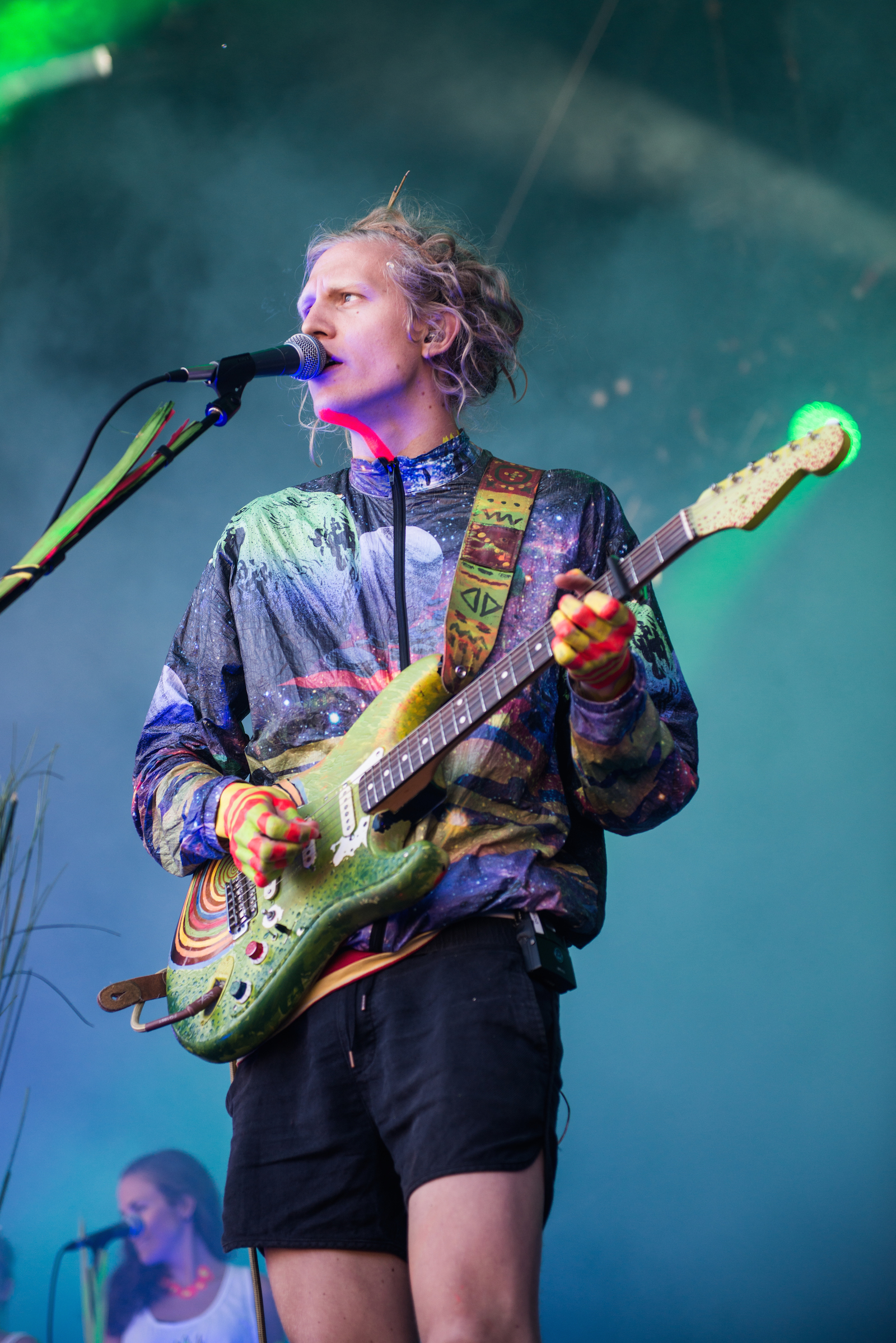
- Dosser Brandt of Disaster In The Universe, Hove Festival 2014

Background information
- Origin: Bergen, Oslo, Fredrikstad, Norway
- Genres: Electronica, rock, psychedelia, pop, dub, calypso
- Years active: 2012–present
- Label: New Times
- Members: Dosser Brandt; Jonas Jacques Rohde Moe
- Website: disasterintheuniverse.com

Disaster In The Universe is a Norwegian psychedelic (psychedelia), rock-pop-dub-band from Oslo, Norway. The band worked with Empire of the Sun producer Peter Mayes on their debut album Coconut Message, which was released in Norway in the spring of 2014. The album received critical acclaim from the Norwegian music press, amongst those a rating of 5/6 from national newspaper Dagbladet. The band has played at many large festivals in Norway such as the Hove Festival, the Øya Festival, Slottsfjellfestivalen and By:Larm, and has also played support for Crystal Fighters. Ross Allen from Island Records (UK) and Flora Wong from Dazed Digital rated Disaster In The Universe as the best concert they saw at the entire Øya Festival in 2012. In the summer of 2014, the band announced a tour of Germany, the Netherlands and other European countries during the autumn of 2014 and the spring of 2015.

== History ==
Disaster In The Universe released their first single "Natural" on 22 January 2012. The song was picked up and recommended by NRK URØRT and played regularly at national radio station NRK P3. "DITU" won the band competition Hoveslaget in March 2012, and was selected for the Hove Festival and Månefestivalen in the summer of 2012.

The single "Beach House" was released on 7 May 2012, and the band was the same day named "UKENS URØRT" by NRK P3. Live from the Grieg Hall in Bergen, the band opened the national TV-show Gullruten on TV2 with "Beach House". The song became a national summer-hit in 2012 after being listed at over 12 radio channels (including the A-List of NRK P3), and through a series of concerts during the summer (including Hove Festival, Palmesusfestivalen, Slottsfjellfestivalen, Månefestivalen, Øya Festival, Blest 2012, Oslo Culture Night and Amnesty TV-Aksjonen, in addition to the Krokstrand festival, Uddevalla kalaset and the Snuss-Stock festival in Sweden). During the year the band also played loads of concerts in Norway including Chateau Neuf (Oslo), Blå (Oslo), Fugazi (Oslo), Parkteateret (Oslo), Rockefeller (Oslo), Dattera til Hagen (Oslo), Kvarteret (Bergen), Total (Tønsberg) and Samfundet (Trondheim). While working on their debut album, Coconut Message, the band toured in Norway, Germany and Russia during 2014.

The band's third single, "Curiosity" was released in November 2012, and was recommended by the Norwegian streaming service WIMP as "Probably one of the best Norwegian songs this year".

Fourth single "Recovering" was released in April 2013, while the song "Yugen (Telling Me All)" was released on 15 November 2013, and was listed on Norwegian radio station NRK P3 soon after.

Their debut album Coconut Message was released in Norway on 14 March 2014, and received critical acclaim in the Norwegian music press including from Dagbladet, "VG", "Musikknyheter" and The Young Folks.

== Members ==
- Dosser Brandt (vocals and guitar)
- Jonas Jacques Rohde-Moe (vocals, guitar, synth and marimba)

=== Live ===
- Dosser Brandt (vocals, guitar)
- Jonas Jacques Rohde-Moe (guitar, synth, marimba and vocals)
- Andreas Kase (vocals, synth, guitar)
- Magnus Falkenberg (bass)
- Mads Johansen (drums and percussion)
- Jørgen Bagheera Apeness (percussion)

== Discography ==
=== Albums ===
- 2014: Coconut Message

=== Singles ===
- 2012: "Natural"
- 2012: "Beach House"
- 2012: "Curiosity"
- 2013: "Recovering"
- 2013: "Yugen (Telling Me All)"
- 2014: "Sunlight"
