= Death by Unga Bunga =

Norwegian garage rock band

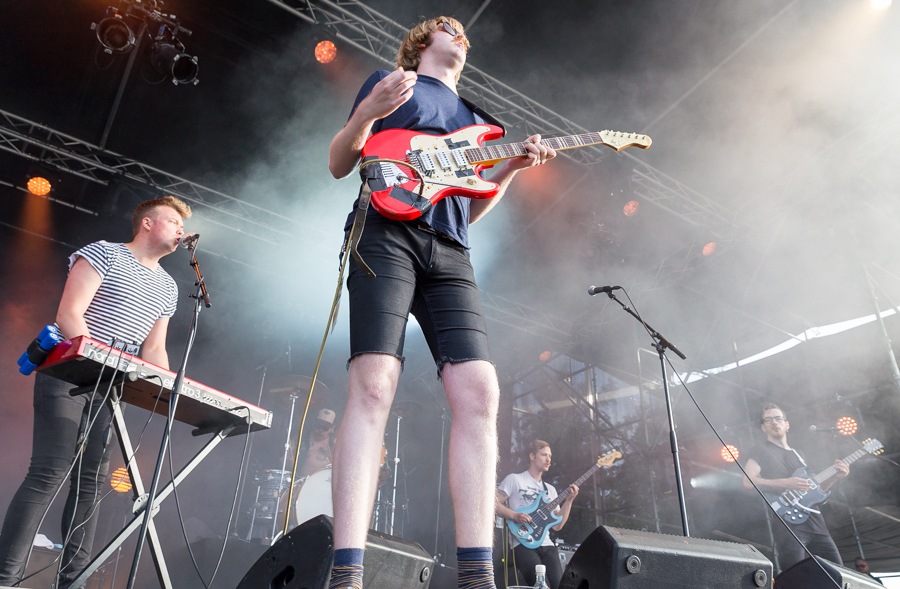
- Death by Unga Bunga at Stavernfestivalen

Background information
- Origin: Moss, Norway
- Genres: Garage rock
- Years active: 2010–present
- Members: Sebastian Ulstad Olsen; Preben S. Andersen; Stian S. Gulbrandsen; Even Rolland Pettersen; Ole S. Nesset
- Website: www.deathbyungabunga.no

Death by Unga Bunga is a Norwegian garage rock band from Moss, Norway.

== History ==
Death by Unga Bunga released their debut studio album in 2010 titled Juvenile Jungle. In 2012, the band released their second full-length album titled The Kids Are Up To No Good. In 2013, Death by Unga Bunga released their third full-length album titled You're An Animal. In 2016, Death by Unga Bunga released their fourth full-length album titled Pineapple Pizza. In September 2016, the band released an EP titled Fight!.

== Band members ==
- Sebastian Ulstad Olsen (lead vocals, guitar)
- Preben S. Andersen (guitar, keyboards)
- Stian S. Gulbrandsen (guitar)
- Even Rolland Pettersen (bass)
- Ole S. Nesset (drums)

== Discography ==
Studio albums

- Juvenile Jungle (Spoon Train Audio, 2010)
- The Kids Are Up to No Good (Jansen Records, 2012)
- You're an Animal (Jansen Records, 2013)
- Pineapple Pizza (Jansen Records, 2016)
- So Far So Good So Cool (Jansen Records, 2018)
- Heavy Male Insecurity (Jansen Records, 2021)
- Raw Muscular Power (Jansen Records, 2025)
