= Torch (band) =

Norwegian metalcore band

- Origin: Trondheim, Norway
- Genre: Metalcore
- Years active: 1999–present
- Labels: Kong Tiki Records (2005-present); MBN (2010-present)
- Members: Marius Forbord; Jørgen Berg; Tommy Kviseth; Thomas Farstad; Ola Pettersen
- Website: Official website

Torch is a Norwegian metalcore band from Trondheim, Norway.

== History ==
Torch was formed in Trondheim, Norway in 1999. Their style back then was a combination of hardcore and nu metal. The sound of their early demos bears a strong resemblance to the style of bands like Korn, Deftones and especially Snot.

In 2003, with new key members added to the line-up, they released the Visions Of... EP. It was released independently through Hardstar Records. The EP led to a successful national tour with the bands Miksha and Turdus Musicus in early 2004. They toured England the same year, gaining praise from small, but enthusiastic crowds.

In 2005, the band would sign to the Norwegian indie label Kong Tiki Records. Their video, "The Experiment" debuted on the national TV charts Urørt Svisj and ZTV. It helped them keep the fire hot while they started recording their debut album. The recording process would eventually take 7 months to complete. The documentary, titled How to Start a Fire was added as a limited edition bonus DVD on their debut album. "The Experiment" remains the band's most well-known song.

On March 27, 2006 Death to Perfection was released. It debuted at No. 23 on the Norwegian Billboard Chart, supported by a video for the song "K-Bomb" that would air weekly on ZTV. The album debuted at No. 1 on the charts on Trøndertoppen (The Trønder Top). The band would end up playing the biggest festivals in the country like Quart Festivalen and Stavernfestivalen, sharing stages with bands like Tool, Placebo, Opeth and Wolfmother.

In 2008, the band released a self-titled EP on cassette to the surprise of some. Torch are in the midst of recording their second album, which was planned for a late 2009/early 2010 release. Although the recording session didn't end until the end of 2010 when they sent the album into the final mixing and mastering. The album Pt.IV: A New Beginning was recorded and engineered by Jørgen (guitar) and the band in their own studio. Except the drums, which was recorded at Skarp Studio with Jon-Tore Dombu (ex-guitarist in Torch, the Hate Colony). It was mixed by Steve Evetts in late 2010, and mastered by Alan Douches at West West Side Music. Pt.IV: A New Beginning was released in 2011.

In November 2011 some of the members from Torch (Ola, Jørgen) produced the EP "Man is a Wolf to Man" for the sludge/prog metal band Terodon.

== Band members ==
=== Current members ===
- Marius Forbord - vocals (1999–present)
- Jørgen Berg - guitar, vocals (2002–present)
- Tommy Kviseth - bass (2004–present)
- Thomas Farstad - drums, vocals (2002–present)
- Ola Pettersen - guitar, vocals (2009–present)

=== Former members ===
- Jon Tore Dombu - guitar (2007–2008)
- Torbjørn Ringstad - guitar, vocals (2004–2007)
- Erlend Nibe - guitar (1999–2004)
- Mats Paulsen - drums (switched to guitar in 2002) (1999–2003)
- Endre Forbord - bass (1999–2002)

== Discography ==
=== Albums ===
- Death to Perfection (2006)
- Pt. IV: A New Beginning (2011)

=== EPs ===
- Visions Of... (2003)
- Torch (2008)

=== Singles ===
- "Wake Me When It's Over" (2011)

=== Music videos ===
- "The Experiment" (2005) [Ignore Entertainment]
- "K-Bomb" (2006) [Ignore Entertainment]
- "Previously Cured" (2007) [Ignore Entertainment]
- "Hathem" (2010) [Ignore Entertainment]
- "Wake Me When It's Over" (2011) [Ignore Entertainment]

=== DVDs ===
- How to Start a Fire (2006) (bonus DVD on Death to Perfection)

=== Compilations ===
- 2112 , appearing on Sellout Vol. 2 (2000)
- K-Bomb, appearing on Hellfest Vol. 2 (2007)
- K-Bomb, appearing on European Metal Assault (2007)

=== Promo releases ===
- Promo '03 (2003) The Slip-Case version of "Visions Of..." with an extra song Far From Alone. Meant for labels.
- Promo '04v1 (2004) Contains the songs I'm All About Something New, Welcome and Insecure
- Promo '04v2 (2004) Features The Experiment; the song which would put Torch in the spotlight of labels and eventually get them signed.
- Promo '05 (2005) Contains the songs The Experiment and Insecure. Used to promote Torch in the USA.
- Promo '08 (2008) Self-released demo. Contains unmastered versions of Breathing, We Bury Our Dead Alive and Repeat Until Sane.
- Friday The 13th Special Promo (2008) Self-released split promo with Miksha. Contains the songs Breathing and Murderer's Alley from their self-titled Cassette EP.
