= Stavernfestivalen =

Norwegian music festival

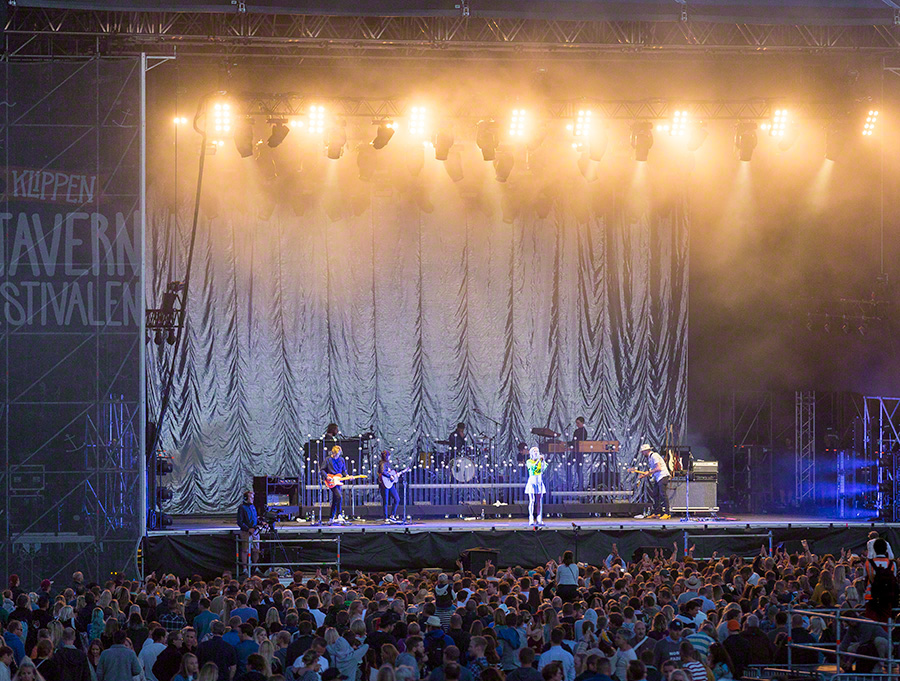
- Veronica Maggio in concert at the main stage in 2016
- Status: Active
- Genre: Music Festival
- Date: Early July
- Begins: 11 July 2019
- Ends: 13 July 2019
- Frequency: Annually
- Location: Stavern
- Country: Norway
- Years active: 2001 – present
- Website: www.stavernfestivalen.no

Stavernfestivalen is an annual music festival held in the month of July, in Stavern, Norway, at the Larvik Golf Arena. The festival is operated by Sky Agency, an independent music company based in Oslo.

The first-ever Stavernfestivalen festival took place in 2001, with 175 attendees, The festival was founded by Roger Albin. The following year, the festival was organised over two days, and in 2011, for three days. By 2019, approximately 75,000 people attended the celebration of music.

== Relocation to the Larvik Golf Arena ==
Up until 2014, the festival was arranged at Skråvika near Minnehallen in Stavern. In 2015, it relocated to the Larvik Golf Arena – a much larger, more spacious area where the organisers could focus on further developing and improving the overall experience.

Camping and food services have greatly improved since this move. For example, in 2019, the campgrounds were able to support roughly 8000 attendees and 26 food distributors in the festival arena.

== International Artists ==
Initially, artists at the festival were almost exclusively Norwegian, but gradually, more prominent international artists began to appear. These include a range of artists, such as Travis Scott, Bob Dylan, Ed Sheeran, Elton John, Alan Walker, Neil Young, KYGO, Post Malone, David Guetta, Wiz Khalifa, Dua Lipa, Sigrid and Swedish House Mafia.

== Martin Garrix and A$AP Rocky booked for Stavernfestivalen 2020 ==
In 2020, A$AP Rocky, Martin Garrix, The 1975, Kamelen, and Isah & Dutty Dior were all booked for the festival, which was due to take place from 9 to 11 July but was cancelled due to the COVID-19 pandemic. The festival did not take place in 2021 either, returning in 2022 after a two-year absence.

== Bands and artists ==
Year	Artists and bands
2001	Bare Egil Band, Lars Lillo-Stenberg, Midnight Choir, Corbin
2002	Björn Rosenström (S), Big Bang, Surferosa, Klappa Pappas Bamse, Briskeby, Ugress
2003	Weeds, Gåte, Folk & Røvere, Bertine Zetlitz, Ephemera, Briskeby, Thomas Dybdahl, Delaware, Ralph Myerz and the Jack Herren Band, CC Cowboys, Askil Holm
2004	Mannskoret, Turboneger, Side Brok, Magnet, Spetakkel, Morten Abel, Madrugada, Datarock, Ravi og DJ Løv, Minor Majority, Fountainheads, Gåte, Corbin, Evil Tordivel
2005	JR Ewing, Christer Knutsen, Karpe Diem, Annie, Madrugada, Johndoe, Sofian, Bertine Zetlitz, Secret Rivals of Lama, Intourium, Animal Alpha, WE, Paperboys, Sondre Lerche, Ralph Myerz and the Jack Herren Band, Briskeby, Ane Brun, Jim Stärk, X-Makeena (FR)
2006	Vamp, Dumdum Boys, Heroes & Zeros, Torch, Superfamily, Marit Larsen, The Pioneers, The Low Frequenze in Stereo, Thom Hell, Pogo Pops, Karpe Diem, Marthe Wulff, Vidar Wang, Bellman, Maria Mena, Iskra, Kaizers Orchestra, Clawfinger (S)
2007	Tom McRae (UK), Magnet, The School, Christel Alsos, Moving Oos, Turboneger, Åge Alexandersen og Sambandet, King Midas, Al DeLoner, CC Cowboys, Sondre Lerche, Susanne Sundfør, Grand Island, Magnus Tingsek, Lukas Kasha, Lillebjørn Nilsen, Satyricon, Kristin Asbjørnsen
2008	Det Är Jag Som Är Döden, Datarock, Animal Alpha, Chris Lee, Lama, Big Bang, Bertine Zetlitz, Kim Larsen og Kjukken (DK), Raga Rockers, Hellbillies, Kurt Nilsen, Anne Grete Preus, The Disciplines, Ralph Myerz and the Jack Herren Band, Vidar Johnsen & Peter Nordberg (S), Finn Kalvik, Katzenjammer, Larvik Storband, The Royalties, Manatee Rakcet
2009	Kaizers Orchestra, Karpe Diem, Timbuktu (S), Marit Larsen, Maria Mena, Eva & the Heartmaker, Bellman, Åge Alexandersen og Sambandet, Donkeyboy, Tommy Tokyo and Starving for my Gravy, Karin Park (S), The Blacksheeps, Gjørmebryterne, Lind, Nilsen, Fuentes, Holm
2010	Simple Minds (UK), Dum Dum Boys, Hellbillies, Lars Vaular, John Olav Nilsen og gjengen, Åge Alexandersen og Sambandet, Thom Hell, Marthe Wulff, Nico D og Admiral P, Sirius, Tre Små Kinesere, The Shitsez, Abalone Dots (S), Smoke Mohawk, Tellusalie
2011	Roxette (S), Roger Hodgson (UK), BigBang, Bernhoft, Jahn Teigen, Admiral P, Kurt Nilsen, Henning Kvitnes, Ida Jenshus, Susanne Sundfør, Montee, Oslo Ess, Lukestar, Rumble in Rhodos, The Captain and Me, Djerv, Proviant
2012	Laleh (S), Kent (S), The Soundtrack of Our Lives (S), Veronica Maggio (S), Kaizers Orchestra, Dum Dum Boys, SIvert Høyem, Bjørn Eidsvåg, CC Cowboys, LidoLido, Bernhoft, Den Svenska Björnstammen (S), Vinni, Eggum & Sivertsen, Karpe Diem, Monica Heldal, Andrè Holstad.
2013	Diskorama, Oslo Ess, Alina Devecerski, Lissie, Lindstrøm, Bigbang, Envy, Will.i.am, Rulefinn, Ole Paus, Mikhael Paskalev, Jah Ark Manifest, Hellbillies, Don Martin, DJ Nuhhh (Kids Love Wax), Anne Grete Preus, Tarjej Strøm, Sting, Stavern Massiv, Kurt Nilsen, Kimichi, Stein Torleif Bjella, Morten Abel, Juicy - Patski Love & Chris Stallion, Phil T. Rich, DJ Herkules, Maria Mena, Ralph Myerz, Hayseed Dixie, Håkan Hellstrøm, Olle Abstract, Briskeby.
2014	Lily Allen, Morten Harket, Admiral P, The Royal Concept, Kim Cesario, Bob Dylan, Bo Kaspers Orkester, Violet Road, Odd Nordstoga, Dirty Loops, Jonas Alaska, Proviant Audio, Ed Sheeran, Lars Winnerbäck, Magnus Grønneberg og Damene, Kvelertak, Ylvis, Angel Haze, Lemaitre, DJ Tarjei Strøm.
2015	Linda Pira, Sabina Ddumba, Daniel Kvammen, Labyrint, XOV, The Lionheads, Sondre Justad, Gavin James, Ralph Myerz & the Jack Herren Band, Highasakite, Gabrielle, Jaa9 & OnklP, deLillos, Echosmith, Kwabs, Pharrell Williams, Big Sean, Elton John, A$AP Rocky.
2016	Alan Walker, Angel Haze, Arif, Astrid S, Bjørn Eidsvåg, Bryson Tiller, Charlie Wilson, Death By Unga Bunga, Ellie Goulding, Jeremy Loops, Julie Bergan, Kehlani, Lukas Graham, Little Jinder, Morten Abel, MØ, Maria Mena, Neil Young + Promise of the Real, Philip Emilio, Phlake, Odd Nordstoga, S!vas, Sivert Høyem, Smith and Thell, Tellef Raabe, Unge Ferrari, Veronica Maggio, Violet Road, Zara Larsson, Åge Aleksandersen og sambandet.
2017	KYGO (NO), Axwell Ingrosso (SE), Karpe (NO), Tinie Tempah (UK), Tory Lanez (CA), Kvelertak (NO), SEEB (NO), Highasakite (NO), Tomine Harket & Unge Ferrari (NO), Broiler (NO), Madden (NO), Oslo Ess (NO), Ezzari (NO), Sonny Alven (NO), Cezinando (NO), Sondre Justad (NO), CC Cowboys (NO), Klovner i Kamp (NO), Store P (NO), Matilda (NO), Conz (NO), Hkeem & Temur (NO), Vamp (NO), Postgirobygget (NO).
2018	Post Malone (US), David Guetta (FR), Wiz Khalifa (US), Dua Lipa (UK), Kaskade (US), Cheat Codes (US), Young Thug (US), Lars Vaular (NO), Broiler (NO), Astrid S (NO), Aurora (NO), Sigrid (NO), Postgirobygget (NO), DeLillos (NO), SG Lewis (UK), Bokassa (NO), Honningbarna (NO), Tove Styrke (SE), Shy Martin (SE).
2019
2020	Festival cancelled due to the COVID-19 pandemic
2021	Festival cancelled due to the COVID-19 pandemic
2022	A-ha, Cardi B, Major Lazer, The Kid Laroi, Acraze, Ashnikko, Astrid S, Clairo, girl in red, Isah & Dutty Dior, James Arthur, Kamelen, Kjartan Lauritzen, Lars Winnerbäck, Madeon, Peach Tree Rascals, Postgirobygget, Rae Sremmurd, Roc Boyz, Sebastian Zalo, Sondre Justad
2023	Karpe, Kygo, Niall Horan, Tiësto, Tyga, Ballinciaga, Broiler, Chris Holsten, Dagny, Ice Spice, Justin Jesso, Postgirobygget, The Stickmen Project, Tinie Tempah, Undergrunn, Adaam, Cherie Mwangi, Dylan, Emma Steinbakken, Hiwa, Julie Bergan, Ka2, Lille Caesar, Moncrieff
2024	Burna Boy, Ed Sheeran, Sam Smith, Broiler, DJ Snake, Undergrunn, Emilie Nicolas, Sigrid, Calum Scott, R3HAB, Veronica Maggio, Flo, Trippie Redd, Kamelen, Roc Boyz, Tinashe, Makosir, Sophie Ellis-Bextor, Tom Grennan, Molly Sandén, Postgirobygget, Victoria Nadine, Bausa, Erik og Kriss, Kjartan Lauritzen, SKAAR, Amara, Ramón, Sam Tompkins
2025	Arif & Stig, Axwell, Gabrielle, G-Eazy, Roc Boyz, Steve Aoki, Swae Lee, Kjartan Lauritzen, Klovner i Kamp, Marstein, Postgirobygget, Salvatore Ganacci, Åge & Sambandet, Don Diablo, Levi, Morten, Otto Knows, Abbo & Amara, Delara, Erik & Kriss, Gjenfødt Kultur, Golfklubb, Honningbarna, Jonas Benyoub, Rabo, Soppgirobygget, Tigergutt101, Tolou, Tyr, Coucheron, Toomanylefthands
