= Postgirobygget (band) =

Norwegian band

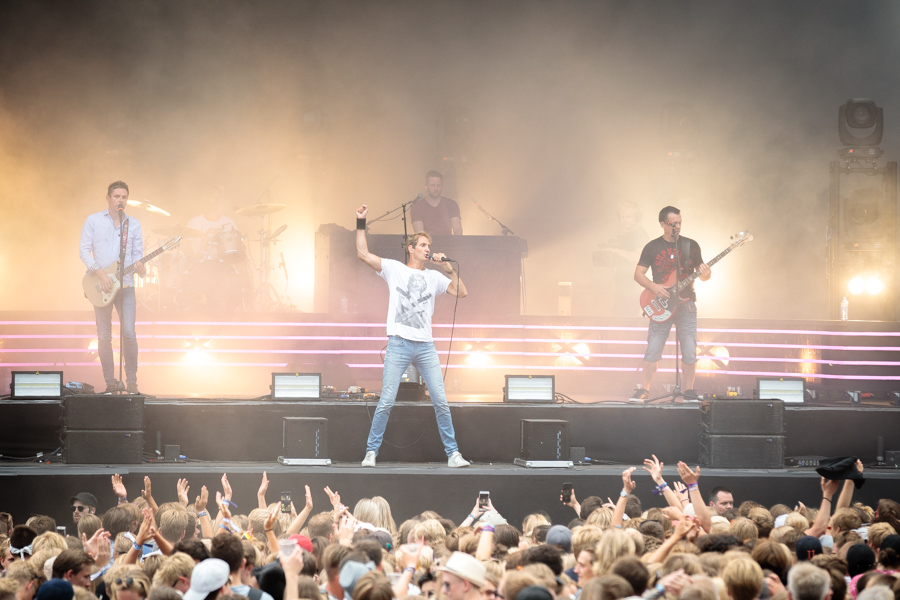
- In a concert at Stavernfestivalen 2018.

Background information
- Origin: Trondheim, Norway
- Genres: Rock; folk rock
- Years active: 1996–present
- Members: Arne Hurlén; Nicolai Hauan; Nils Petter Time; Per Sarin Madsen
- Past members: Gunnar Westgaard; Øyvind Kolset
- Website: www.postgirobygget.no

Postgirobygget is a Norwegian rock band from Trondheim. Singer and songwriter Arne Hurlén, bass player and backing vocals Nicolai Hauan (new member in 2009), guitarist and backing vocals Nils Petter Time, keyboardist and harmonica player Øyvind Kolset, Øyvind Kolset does not play in the band anymore, and drums, percussion and backing vocals Per Sarin Madsen.

== Background ==
The band formed as the cover band The Pissed Off Boys for a student party in late 1994. They never really intended to play as a "proper" band with their own songs, but their live playings created such a passionate fan base that they kept going. As they eventually needed more material to play, the band started playing songs featured on vocalist Arne Hurlén's demo CDs. Realising they had become the "real" band they never intended, the band soon renamed themselves Postgirobygget.

They recorded their first album in 1996 with the title Melis.

== Line-up ==
- Arne Hurlén - guitarist and vocals (1996-)
- Nicolai Hauan - bass and chorus (2009-)
- Nils Petter Time - guitarist and chorus (1996-)
- Øyvind Kolset - keyboards and harmonica (1996-)
- Per Sarin Madsen - Drums, percussion and chorus (1999-)
- Gunnar Westgaard - bass and chorus (1996–2008)

== Discography ==
=== Albums ===
Year	Album	Peak position
Year	Album	NO
1996	Melis	2
1997	Essensuell	1
1999	Supertanker	10
2001	4-4-2	19
2003	Best av alt (compilation)	1
2007	Tidløs	1
2009	Øyeblikk	6
2013	Sommer i Norge	5
2016	Musikk fra Sloko (EP)	
