= Visions Of... =

EP by the hardcore band Torch

Visions of...

EP by Torch
- Released: November 23, 2003
- Recorded: 2003
- Genre: Hardcore metal
- Length: 15:11
- Label: Hardstar Records
- Producer: Torch

Torch chronology
| Visions of... (2003) | Death to Perfection (2006) |

Professional ratings
Review scores
| Source | Rating |
|---|---|
| Adressavisen | |

Visions of... is a Torch studio EP, released independently on November 23, 2003 through Hardstar Records.

The band recorded a pre-production before the recording of their EP, although only 1 song would end up on the EP. B-sides includes the songs Far From Alone and Get Myself a Beer.

The album garnered good reviews, and would shortly after see them co-headlining the Taste New Norway Tour in Norway with friends Miksha and Turdus Musicus supporting the EP.

== Track listing ==
1. "Blindfold" – 2:31
2. "Creation" – 3:19
3. "Torn" – 3:50
4. "Nu (A Love Song)" – 5:31

== Personnel ==
- Torch - Producer
- Jørgen Berg and Erlend Nibe - Artwork
- Marius Forbord - Vocals
- Jørgen Berg - bass guitar
- Erlend Nibe - guitar
- Mats Paulsen - guitar
- Thomas Farstad - drums
