= Death to Perfection =

Death To Perfection

Studio album by Torch
- Released: March 27, 2006
- Recorded: 2005/2006; Dsign Studios; Trondheim, Norway
- Genres: Metalcore, nu metal
- Label: Kong Tiki Records
- Producers: Edgar A. Lien & Torch

Torch chronology
Visions Of... (2003)	Death To Perfection (2006)	Torch (EP) (2008)

Professional ratings
Review scores
Source	Rating
VG (in Norwegian)	(not rated)
Dagbladet (in Norwegian)	(not rated)
Panorama (in Norwegian)	5/6 stars

"Death To Perfection" is the debut album by Torch. The album was released on March 27, 2006, and was recorded at Dsign Studio in Trondheim. It was produced and engineered by the band themselves and Edgar Lien.

== Track listing ==
All tracks by Torch

1. "K-Bomb" – 3:37
2. "I'm All About Something New" – 2:37
3. "Endeavour" – 2:59
4. "The Experiment" – 3:27
5. "Everything Consists (Of What You Might Believe)" – 3:53
6. "Previously Cured" – 6:20
7. "A.I.H.O.G." – 3:47
8. "So We've Come To This" – 4:22
9. "A Few Moments Of Clarity" – 5:19
10. "Mary" – 5:11

== Personnel ==
- Marius Forbord - Vocals
- Jørgen Berg - Guitar
- Torbjørn Ringstad - Guitar
- Tommy Kviseth - Bass
- Thomas Farstad - Drums

=== Additional personnel ===
- Jan Arild Johansen - piano on Track 6 (interlude)
- Gunnhild Sundli (Gåte) - guest vocals on "Everything Consists (Of What You Might Believe)"
