= Horisont (band) =

Swedish hard rock band

Horisont was a Swedish hard rock band that released six albums from 2009 to 2021. Three appeared on Rise Above Records and two on Century Media Records. Horisont were active from 2006 until their disbandment in 2021.

== History ==
Horisont was formed in 2006 in Gothenburg by Axel Söderborg (vocals), Charles van Loo (guitar), Pontus Jordan (drums), and Magnus Delborg (bass). Kristofer Möller was part of the original lineup as a second guitarist and left the band later. The band’s name is Swedish for “horizon”.

In 2009, their debut album Två sidor av horisonten was released through Crusher Records. Their second album, Second Assault, followed in 2012 on Rise Above Records. The label also issued their third and fourth albums, Time Warriors (2014) and Odyssey (2015). For Odyssey, former Church of Misery guitarist Tom Sutton replaced founding member Kristofer Möller. The band later signed with the German label Century Media. Sutton left the band and was replaced by David Kälin.

In 2017, Horisont released their fourth album About Time, which marked their first appearance in both the German and Swedish album charts. Their fifth album, Sudden Death (2020), also entered the German charts.

On 17 September 2021, Horisont announced their dissolution on Facebook.

== Discography ==
- Två sidor av horisonten (2009)
- Second Assault (2012)
- Time Warriors (2013)
- Odyssey (2015)
- About Time (2017)
- Sudden Death (2020)

== External link ==
- Discogs

=== Further reading ===
- Review of Time Warriors by Stormbringer.at (in German)
- Review of Time Warriors by Rocknytt (in Swedish)
- Review of About Time by Stormbringer.at (in German)
- Review of Odyssey by Stormbringer.at (in German)
- Review of Sudden Death by Stormbringer.at (in German)
- Review of Sudden Death by Rocknytt (in Swedish)
