= Violet Road =

Norwegian folk and rock band

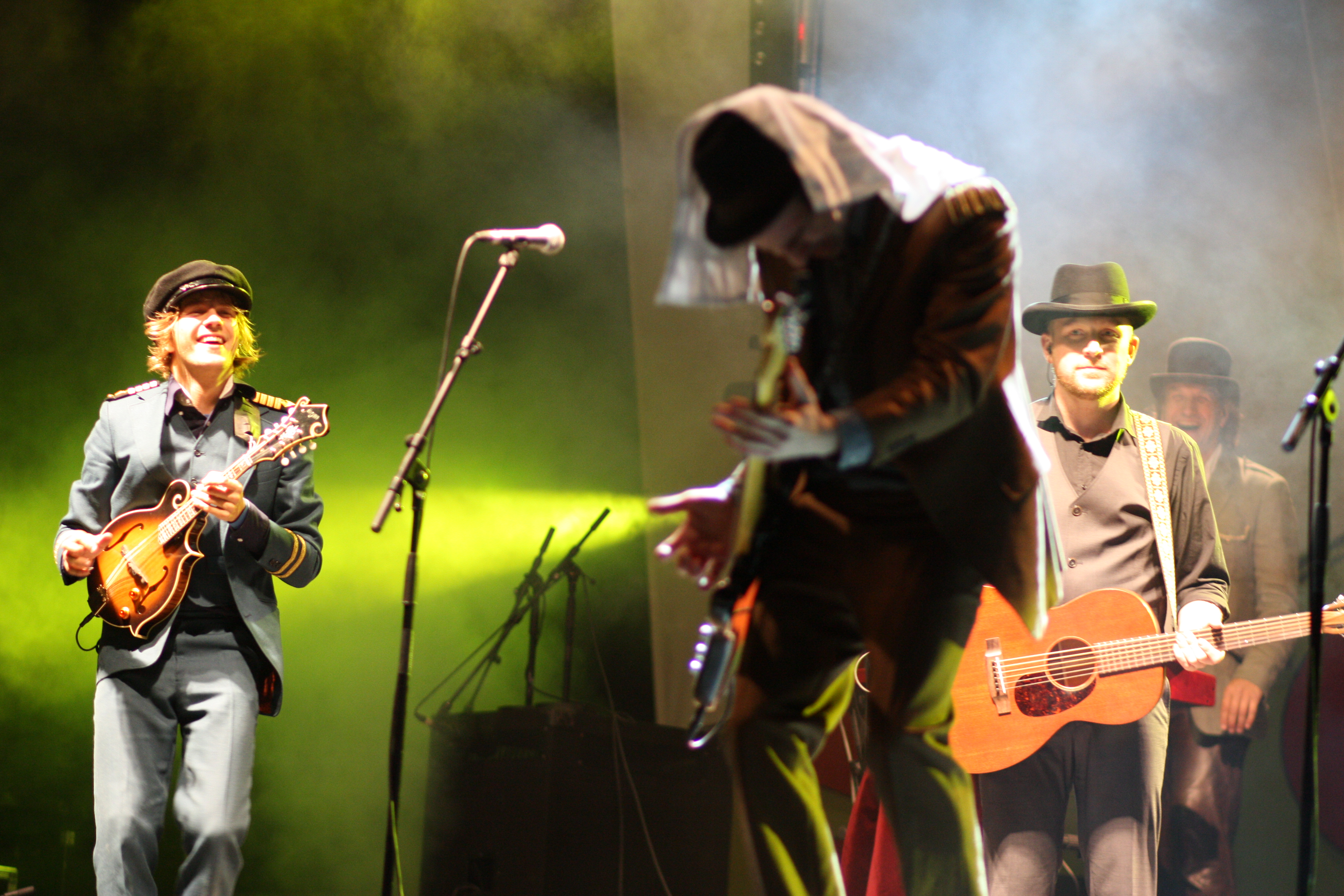

Background information
- Origin: Tromsø, Norway
- Genres: Pop rock/Folk rock
- Years active: 2007–present
- Label: Violet Road
- Members: Håkon Rundberg; Hogne Rundberg; Halvard Rundberg; Kjetil Holmstad-Solberg; Espen Høgmo. Earlier : Herman Rundberg
- Website: www.violetroad.no

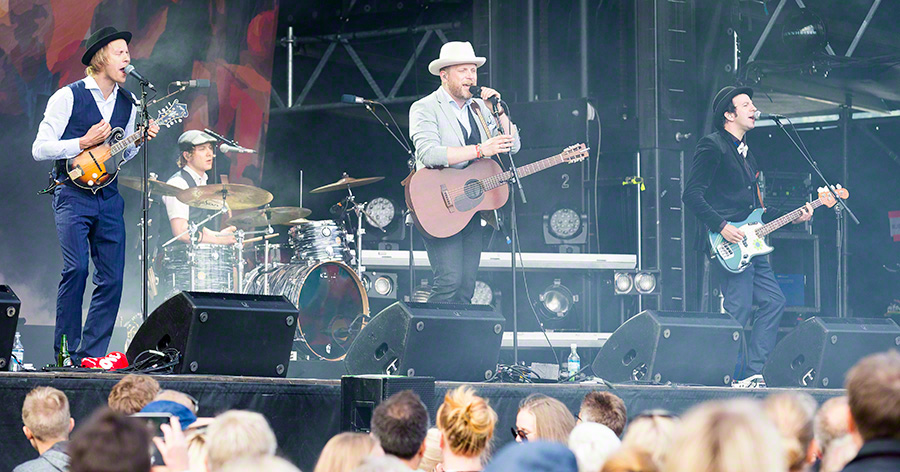
Violet Road at stage at a concert at Stavernfestivalen in 2016

Violet Road is a Norwegian folk and rock band from Tromsø who sing mainly in English. The band is made up of five members, the three brothers Håkon, Hogne and Halvard Rundberg together with Kjetil Holmstad-Solberg and Espen Høgmo.

Earlier also another brother, Herman Rundberg.

== Discography ==
=== Albums ===
Year	Album	Peak position NOR	Certification
2008	Letters	–	
2011	Violet Road	9	
2013	Peter Every and His Marching Band	5	
2014	Back to the Roadshow	2	
2016	In Town to Get You	24	
2018	Lines Across Light	-	
2021	A New Day Begins	-	

=== Singles ===
- 2010: "Crazy as Can Be"
- 2011: "Can You Hear the Morning Singing"
- 2012: "Burning Up"
- 2013: "Last Days In India"
- 2014: "Face Of The Moon"
- 2014: "People Of The Sun"
- 2015: "We Are The Love"
- 2015: "Out Of Words"
- 2018: "Monument"
- 2018: "Keep On Running"
- 2018: "Falling Stars"
- 2018: "Always"
- 2019: "backseat babies"

== Band members ==
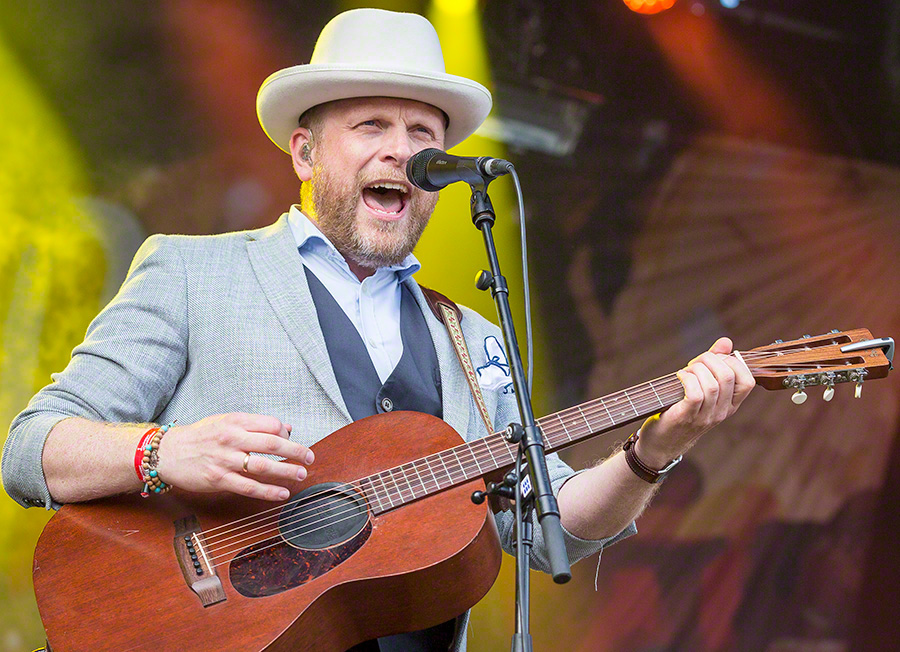

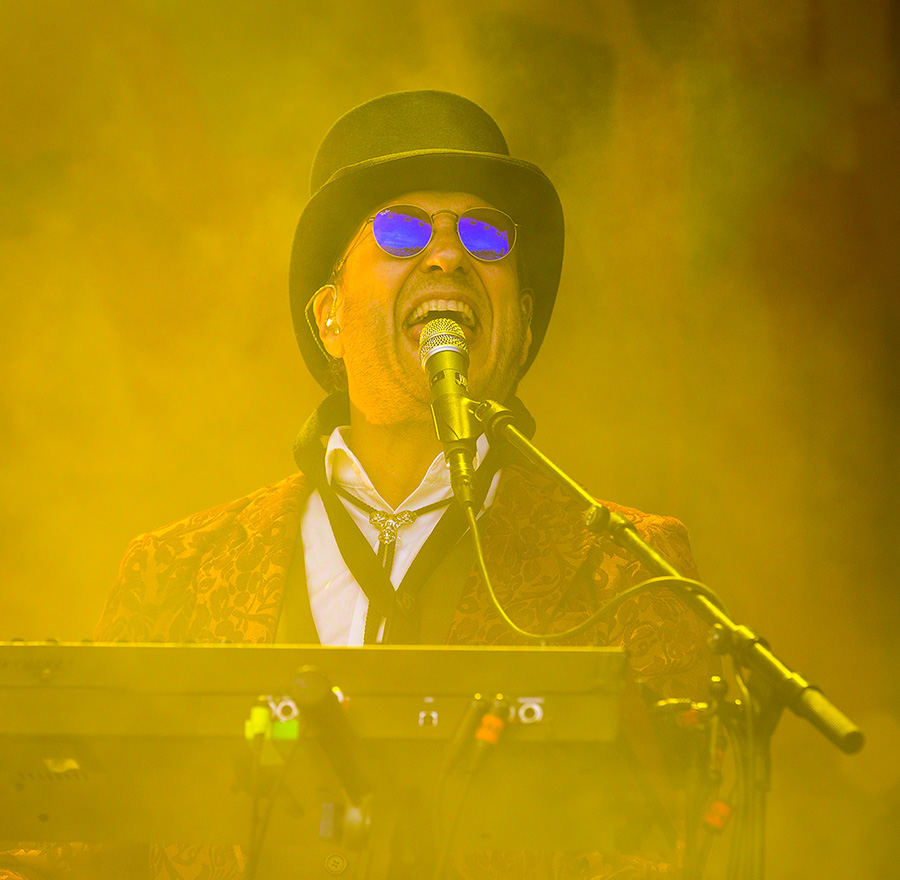

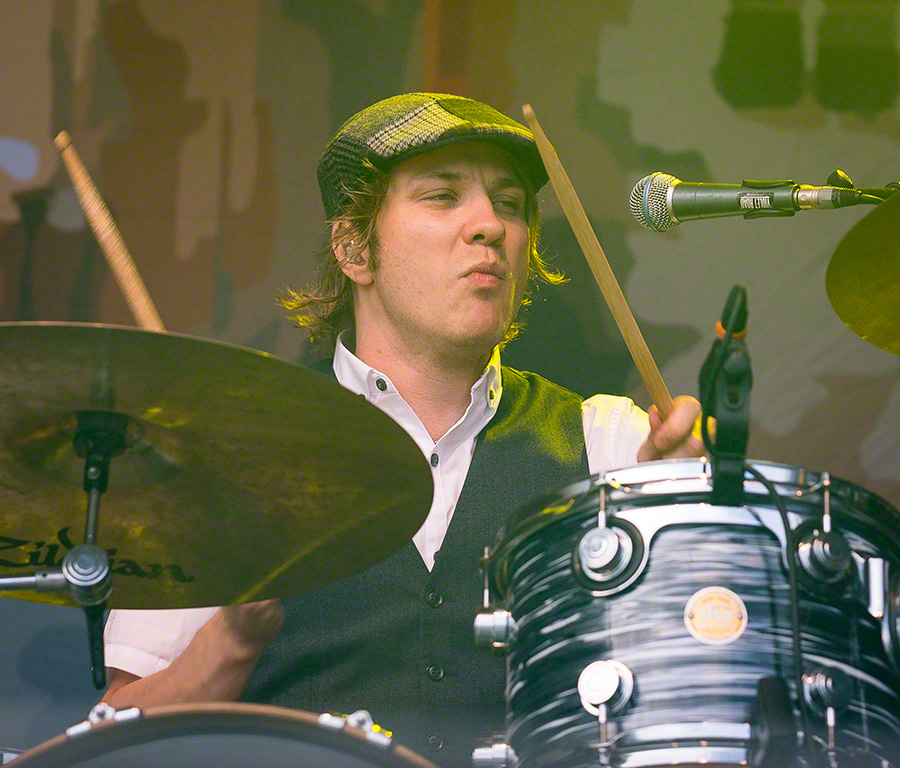

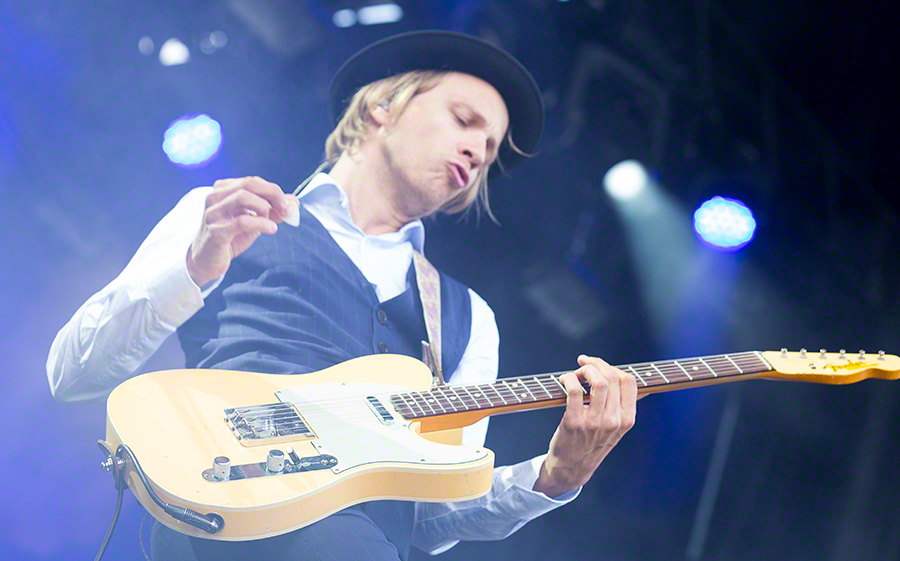

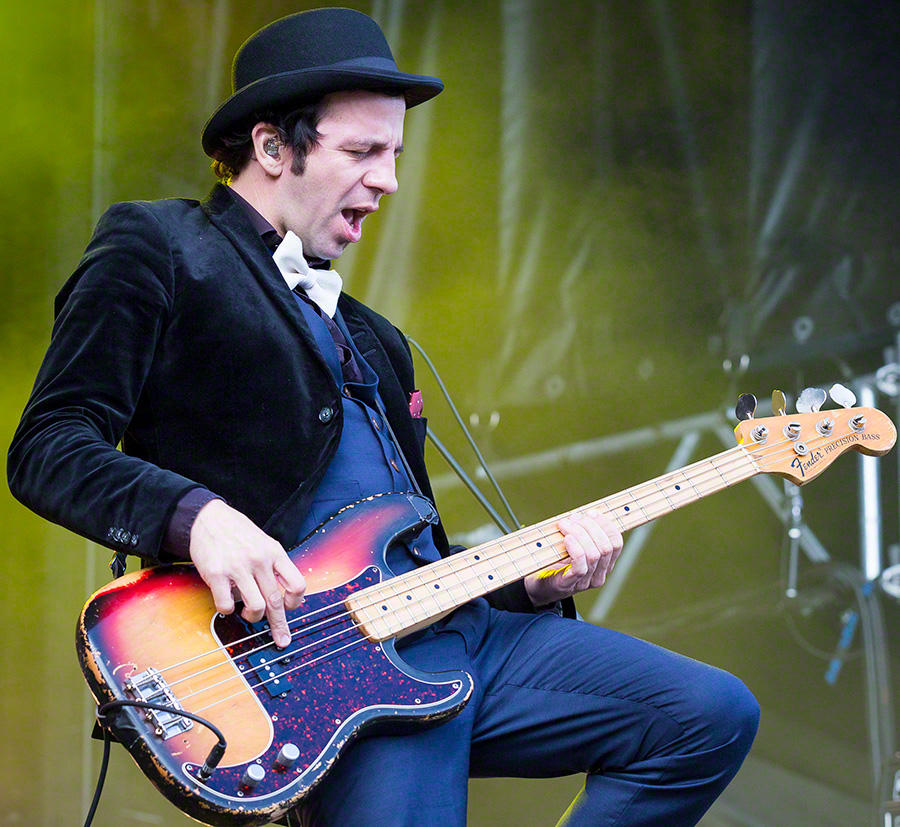
