= Purified in Blood =

Norwegian band

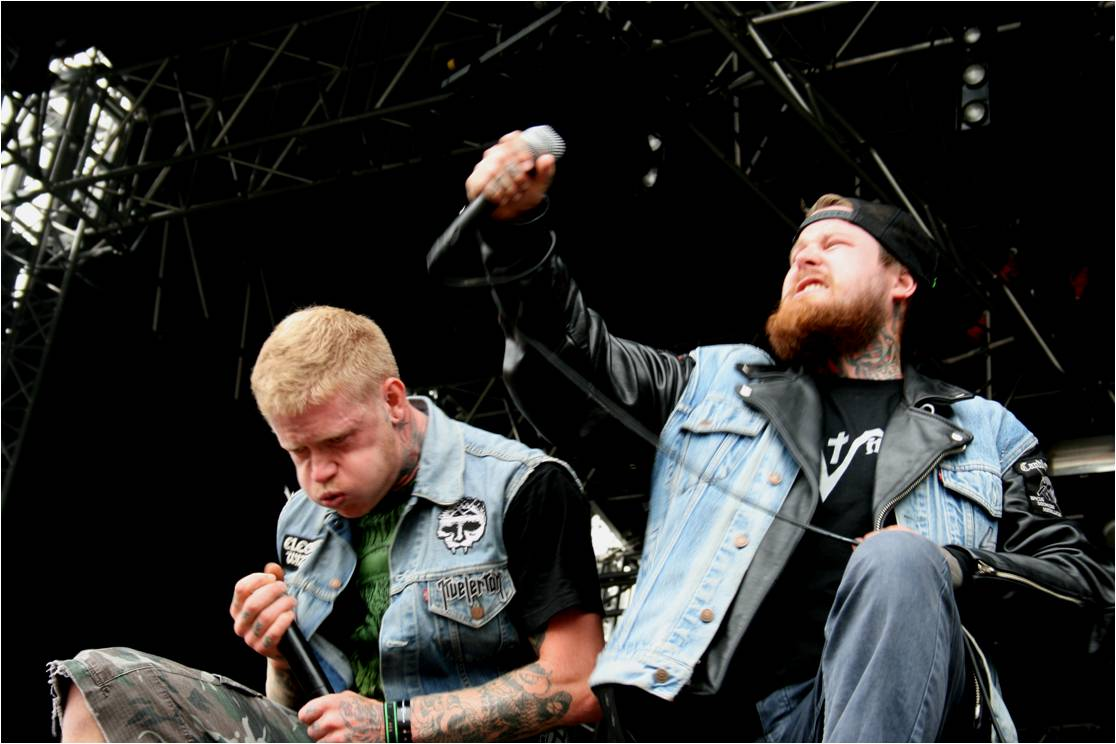
- Purified In Blood at Norway Rock Festival 2010

Background information
- Origin: Hommersåk, Norway
- Genres: Metalcore
- Years active: 2003–2007, 2008–present
- Labels: Alveran Records (Europe), Abacus Recordings (USA)
- Members: Glenn Cato Rasmussen; Hallgeir Skretting Enoksen; Anders Mosness; Tommy Svela; Sander Loen; Stig Skog Andersen
- Past members: Lars Sindre Ånneland
- Website: myspace.com/purifiedinblood

Purified in Blood (PiB) is a Norwegian metal band from Hommersåk, near Sandnes. They started up in the winter of 2003, and dissolved in January 2007 though on April 25, 2008 they announced that they now are back. They play Nu metal with roots in hardcore.

== History ==
In the summer of 2004 they released the EP Last Leaves of a Poisoned Tree on the American underground-label New Eden Records. Later that year they won the Zoom-awards together with Rumble in Rhodos and Vishnu. As a result of this the band got to play during by:Larm and Øya Festival in 2005, and also tour around the country. They also toured several times in United States and Europe with bands like Undying, Heaven Shall Burn and God Forbid.

In the spring of 2005 the signed for the German recordlabel Alveran Records, who released their full length Reaper of Souls, in 2006. The album also got released on Abacus Records in the US.

January 21, 2006 the band won the Alarm Award 2006 for Best Live Band, competing with huge Norwegian bands such as Madrugada, Kaizers Orchestra and Turbonegro.

The band dissolved in January 2007. There was reportedly many reasons for the breakup, but one of them, and maybe the most significant one, is that several of the members had decided no longer to follow the Straight Edge lifestyle, which had been an important theme in the band's material. The band announced the break-up with this blog on their MySpace-site:

We want to thank each and everyone of you who supported us and helped us along the way.
-Glenn, Hallgeir, Sander, Tommy, Stig & Anders
"Good things never last"

April 25, 2008 the Purified in Blood-members announced that they were gathered again to play together, this time stronger, harder and better than ever.

The same way that the dissolvation was advertised, they gave notice of their reunion on MySpace:

Purified in Blood Reunion
To all our friends out there; we are back and we are stronger than ever!
This summer we will appear at the Norwegian Hove festival and at a show with the mighty Madball in Oslo. Stay tuned for news throughout the summer.
HORNS!
- Glenn, Hallgeir, Sander, Tommy, Stig & Anders
PURIFIED IN BLOOD

In 2010, they released an album entitled "Under Black Skies" on Universal Recordings and have played many shows, supporting bands such as Slayer, Enslaved, Darkest Hour, Protest the Hero and Born of Osiris

In 2011 the second singer Glenn Reaper left the band.

In 2012 Purified in Blood signed with the Norwegian metal label Indie Recordings and released their highly acclaimed 3rd album "Flight Of A Dying Sun"

== Sideprojects ==
Anders Mosness used to play guitar in Kvelertak, now he is playing in the drone/doom/experimental band "Solens Barn". Glenn Reaper now plays in the doom/stoner band Helldiver.

== Band members ==
- Glenn Reaper (vocals) 2003-2011
- Hallgeir Skretting Enoksen (vocals)
- Sander Sagblad Loen (lead guitar)
- Tommy Svela (rhythm guitar)
- Stig Skog Andersen (bass)
- Anders Mosness (drums)

== Discography ==
=== Albums ===
- 2006: Reaper Of Souls
- 2010: Under Black Skies
- 2012: Flight Of A Dying Sun
- 2025: Primal Pulse Thunder

=== EP's ===
- 2004: Last Leaves Of A Poisoned Tree
- 2025: Key And Stone
