= Darkside of the Force =

Norwegian hip hop group

- Origin: Norway
- Genres: Hip hop
- Years active: 1998–present
- Members: Oscar Sepulveda; Salvador Sanchez; DJ Breakneck

Darkside Of The Force is a Norwegian hip hop band made up of the half-brothers Oscar Sepulveda and Salvador Sanchez. They currently reside in Kristiansand, Norway (2007). In 1998 they released their debut album Darkside Of The Force. On May 8, 2006, they released the follow-up El Dia De Los Puercos. This album gained them Spellemannprisen 2006 in the hip-hop category. Their single "Indigenous flow" was nominated for the 2009 NME Awards.
