= The Jessica Fletchers =

Norwegian band

- Origin: Norway
- Genres: Rock
- Years active: 1997–present
- Label: Rainbow Quartz Records
- Members: Thomas Innstø; Andreas Mastrup; Rune Somdal; Jan Henning Sørensen; Mats Asvald Innstø
- Past members: Ivar Chr. Johansen; Bjørn Rune Lie; Vegard Syrstad
- Website: thejessicafletchers.com

The Jessica Fletchers are a Norwegian indie-pop band, formed in Drammen (near Oslo) in 1997. The band is named after the Murder, She Wrote character Jessica Fletcher.

== Discography ==
=== Albums ===
- I Can Shoot You From Here (1997)
- What Happened To The? (2003)
- Less Sophistication (2005)
- You Spider (2007)

=== EPs ===
- Sorry About The Noise (2000)
- (Come On) It's Only Nine (2002)

=== Singles ===
- "Bloody Seventies Love" (2004)
- "Summer Holiday & Me" (2005)

== Members ==
=== Current members ===
- Thomas Innstø - lead vocals, guitar (founding member)
- Rune Somdal - lead guitar, backing vocals, percussion (founding member)
- Mats Asvald Innstø - keyboards, backing vocals, percussion (joined in 2003)
- Andreas Mastrup - bass, backing vocals (founding member)
- Jan Henning Sørensen - drums (joined in 2000)

=== Past members ===
- Vegard Syrstad - keyboards, percussion, backing vocals (1997–2002)
- Bjørn Rune Lie - drums, backing vocals (1997–2000)
- Ivar Chr. Johansen (also known as Ravi) - organ, piano, trumpet, percussion, backing vocals (2002–2003)
