= Vishnu (band) =

Norwegian rock band

- Origin: Tromsø, Norway
- Genres: Rock
- Years active: 2004–2013
- Members: Tor Thomassen; Tom Hansen; Eigil Moe Johansen; Olav Solvang; Stian Grønbech
- Website: vishnu.no

Vishnu was a Norwegian rock band from Tromsø.

== History ==
Vishnu was established in August 2002. In autumn 2004, the band won a competition for new bands in the Norwegian national broadcasting corporation NRK, together with Rumble in Rhodos and Purified in Blood. The prize was a national tour in Norway in the spring of 2005.

In 2006, the band released an EP, Lost Soul's Church, on the label Feedback Underground, distributed by Tuba Records.

In 2010 their debut album, Outskirts of Love, was released on the label Big Dipper Records. On 13 January 2013, the band's second album, Nightbeat Love was released, to great critical acclaim.

Vishnu officially disbanded on 14 November 2013, posting a picture and statement on their Facebook page.

== Band members ==
- Tor Thomassen – vocals
- Tom Hansen – guitar
- Eigil Moe Johansen – percussion
- Olav Solvang – bass guitar
- Stian Grønbech – keyboards

== Discography ==
=== Studio albums ===
Title	Album details
Outskirts of Love	Released: 1 November 2010; Label: Big Dipper; Format: CD, digital download
Nightbeat Love	Released: 13 January 2013; Format: CD, digital download

=== Extended plays ===
Title	Album details
Lost Soul's Church	Released: 2006; Label: Feedback Underground/Tuba; Format: CD

=== Singles ===
Title	Year	Album
"Run River Run" (with Dagny)	2011	Non-album single
"Hurricane Heart"	2012	Nightbeat Love
