= Baby in Vain =

Danish rock trio

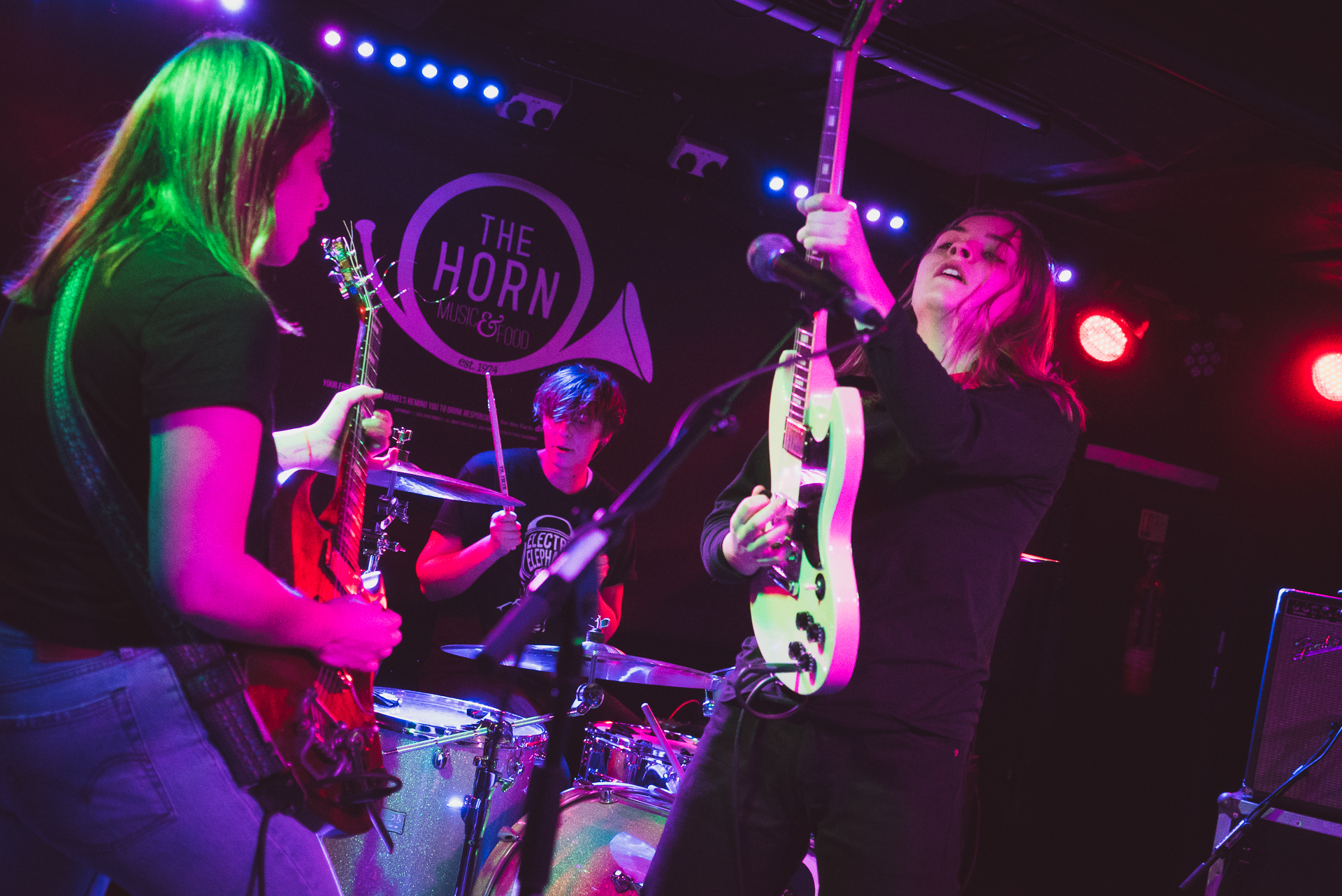
Baby in Vain performing in 2017.

Baby in Vain is an all-girl rock trio from Denmark consisting of Lola Hammerich, Benedicte Pierleoni and Andrea Thuesen. The band was formed in 2010 and their music can be described as grunge, blues and indie-inspired guitar-based noise rock.

Baby in Vain toured as warm-up act for The Floor Is Made Of Lava in the fall of 2012 and performed at the Pavilion Junior Stage at the 2013 Roskilde Festival.

Baby In Vain played a 2014 version of 90s stoner rock and grunge, with heavy guitar riffs and screeching vocals, but still draws in references from sludge and heavy metal.

In 2017 they released their debut album More Nothing.

They received mentions from Mojo Magazine’s Kieron Tyler, Vice and Intro Magazine. They've supported Ty Segall and guitar icon Thurston Moore's band Chelsea Light Moving, and have toured Europe extensively.

== Discography ==
=== Studio albums ===
- More Nothing (Partisan, 2017)
- See Through (Escho, 2020)
- Afterlife (Escho, 2024)

=== EPs ===
- Sweetheart Dreams (promotional demo, 2012)
- For the Kids (Partisan, 2016)

=== Singles ===
- Machine Gun Girl / The Catcher (2012)
- Corny #1 / The Thrill (2013)
- Taught By Hand / Cowboys (2013)
- Seize The End / Alien Arms (2013)
- Transcendent (2017)
- Low Life (2017)
- For Whom the Bell Tolls (2018)
- Everything (2019)
- Wherever I Go (2020)
- Coming Back to You (From "Oxen") (2023)
- Squeeze My Hand (2024)
