= Samsara Blues Experiment =

German rock band

- Origin: Berlin, Germany
- Genres: Hard rock, stoner rock, psychedelic rock, doom metal, stoner metal, post rock
- Years active: 2007–2020
- Members: Christian Peters; Hans Eiselt; Thomas Vedder
- Past members: Richard Behrens

Samsara Blues Experiment is a German band founded in summer 2007 by guitarist Christian Peters after leaving the German psychedelic groove rock band, Terraplane.

The line-up since autumn 2008 includes Hans Eiselt on second guitar, Richard Behrens on bass and Thomas Vedder on drums. All members had been active in different underground bands before. Samsara Blues Experiment plays a mixture between Stoner Rock, Psychedelic Rock and folkloristic influences, especially from raga.

After releasing the first demo the band performed on various occasions in Germany, USA west coast, Italy, Austria, Netherlands and Belgium.

In November 2020, the band announced on their Facebook page that they are going into an indefinite hiatus. In 2024 the band announced a final break up while all members keep being active in new musical projects.

== Discography ==
- 2008: s/t Demo / 2009 Release US-Demo / 2011 US-Demo (Electric Magic Records)
- 2010: Long Distance Trip (World In Sound/Rough Trade)
- 2011: Revelation & Mystery (World In Sound/Rough Trade)
- 2012: Center of the Sun / Midnight Boogie - 12" EP (World In Sound/Rough Trade)
- 2013: Live at Rockpalast (Electric Magic Records)
- 2013: Waiting for the Flood (Electric Magic Records)
- 2017: One with the Universe (Electric Magic Records)
- 2021: End of Forever (Electric Magic Records)
- 2023: Rock Hard In Concert (Electric Magic Records)
