= Navigators (Norwegian band) =

Navigators is a Norwegian pop band with lead singer Trond Andreassen (formerly of the Ricochets). The band released its debut single "Wall of Stone" in 2009 and its debut album The Straight and the Narrow in 2010. The band is signed to Sony Music.

== Discography ==
=== Albums ===
Album	Year	Peak chart positions	Certifications
Album	Year	NOR	Certifications
The Straight and Narrow	2010	2	
Second Nature	2011	18	

=== Singles ===
Single	Year	Peak chart positions	Certifications	Album
Single	Year	NOR	Certifications	Album
"Wall of Stone"	2009	7		
