= Daniel Norgren =

Musical artist

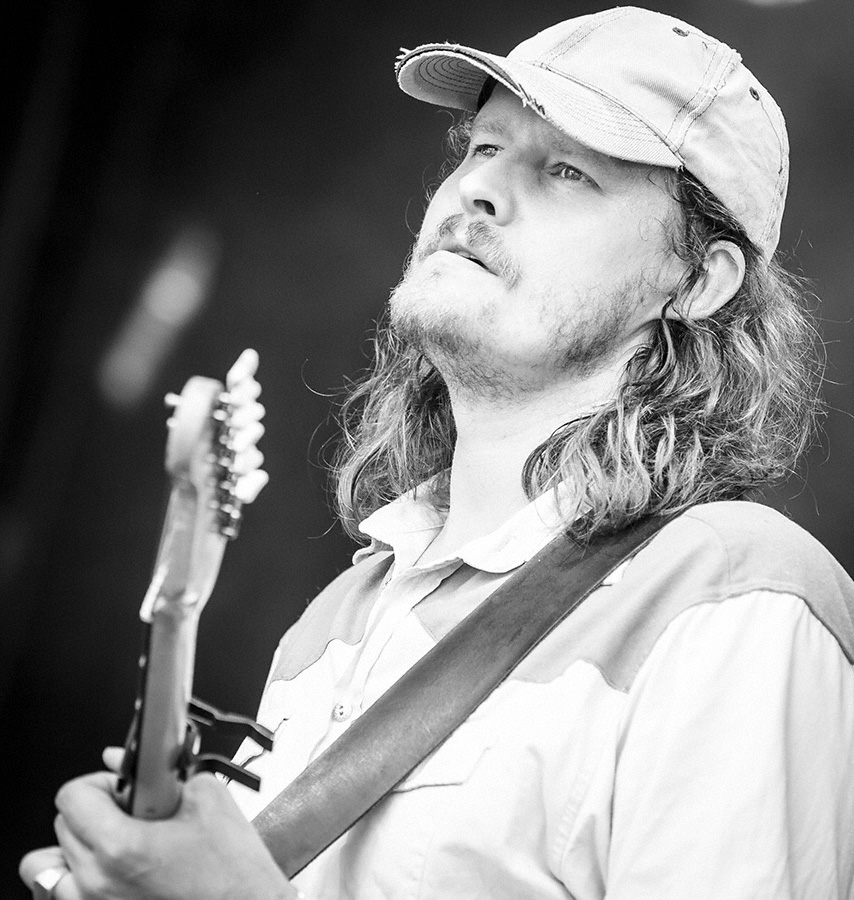

Background information
- Born: Lennarth Daniel Norgren; 18 July 1983 (age 42)
- Origin: Borås, Västergötland, Sweden
- Genres: Folk, rock, blues
- Years active: 2007–present
- Label: Superpuma

Lennarth Daniel Norgren (born 18 July 1983) is a Swedish singer-songwriter. He has been working through a small indie label called Superpuma Records since 2006.

Norgren's debut album Kerosene Dreams was mainly recorded on homemade instruments and was followed up by Outskirt in 2008. This album attracted a steady crowd of blues fans and also opened the doors for touring Europe. In 2010, Horrifying Deatheating Bloodspider was released and opened the doors even wider. It was also nominated for singer-songwriter album of the year at the Swedish manifest gala. Horrifying Deatheating Bloodspider was followed up by the six-track EP Black Vultures in late 2011, including "Going Home Finally" that was originally tracked for and aired in the BBC Radio show called God's Jukebox.

On stage, Norgren plays the piano and guitar, with Anders Grahn on upright bass, while Andreas Filipsson sometimes accompanies the duo on a homemade organ. Norgren has played festivals and venues in Europe such as Way Out West in 2010, Roskilde Festival in 2011, and End of the Road in 2023.

In early 2013, the album Buck was released, followed up by a European tour. Most of the songs on Buck were recorded in Norgren's home on a 4-channel cassette porta-studio. It contains studio recordings like "Whatever Turns You On". This song was tracked and filmed in the Algorythm Sound studio and quickly became a hit when it came out on YouTube. The album contains a live version of "Moonshine Got Me" that was originally released on the Black Vultures EP, but was re-recorded during a tour in Scandinavia.

In 2015, Norgren's album Alabursy was released, followed by another European tour. Again, most of the songs were recorded at home on his 4-channel cassette porta studio.

In 2022, many songs from Alabursy, along with others by Norgren, were used in an almost-exclusive soundtrack to the film The Eight Mountains.

== Discography ==
- Kerosene Dreams (2007)
- Outskirt (2008)
- Horrifying Deatheating Bloodspider (2010)
- Black Vultures (2011)
- Buck (2013)
- Alabursy (2015)
- The Green Stone (2015)
- Wooh Dang (2019)
- Live (2021)
