= Honningbarna =

Norwegian punk rock band

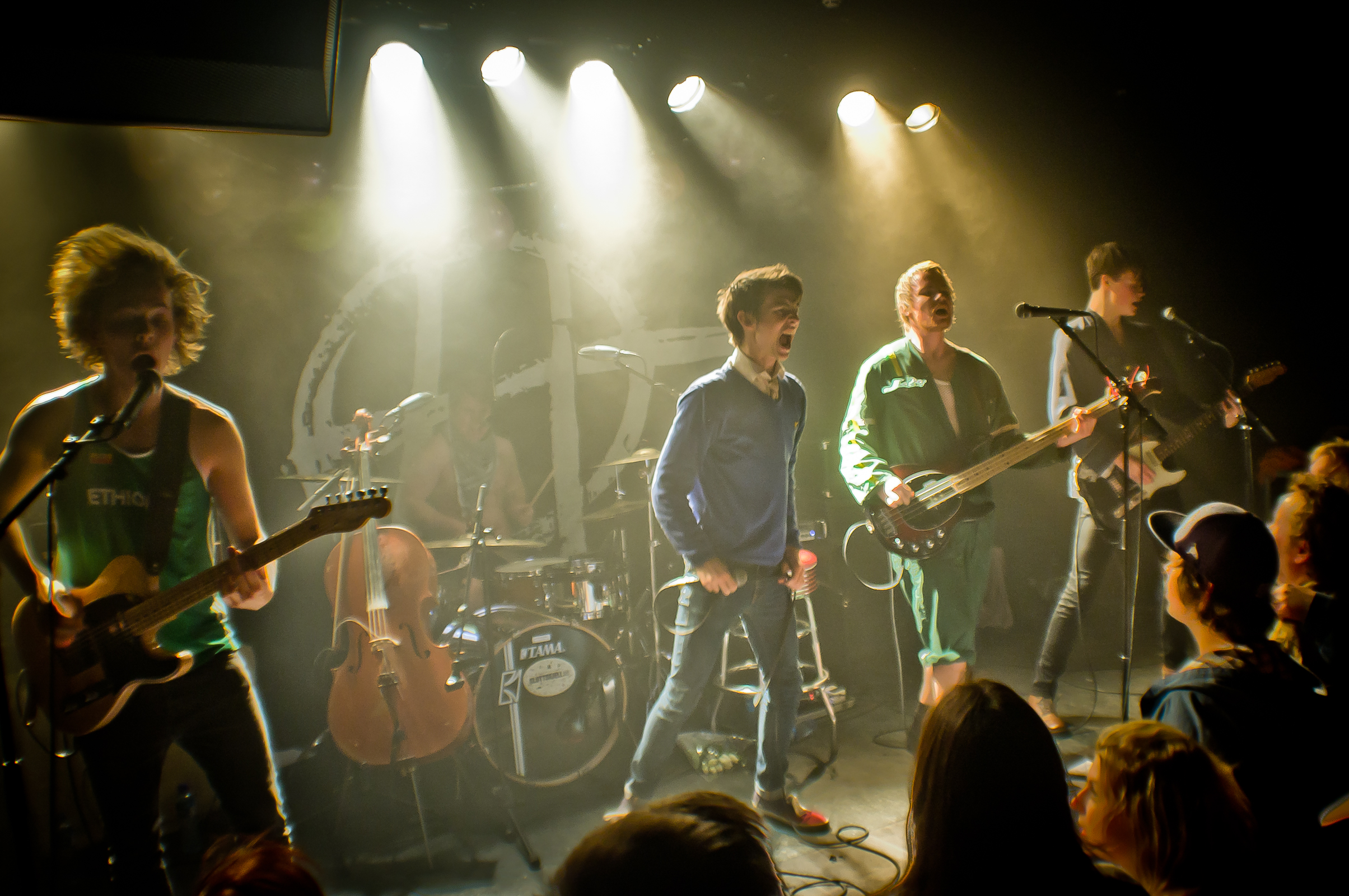
- Honningbarna in 2011

Background information
- Origin: Kristiansand, Norway
- Genres: Punk rock, Post-hardcore, Hardcore punk
- Years active: 2010–present
- Members: Edvard Valberg; Christoffer Trædal; Nils Nilsen; Johan Hansson Liljeberg; Tomas Berglund
- Past members: Mathias Johansson; Anders Eikås; Lars Emmelthun; Fredrik Justnes; Simen Følstad Nilsen
- Website: honningbarna.no

Honningbarna (English: "The Honey Children") is a punk rock band from Kristiansand, Norway, known for performing lyrics in the local Kristiansand dialect.

== Career ==
The band débuted in 2010 with the EP Honningbarna. In January 2011, they were named as the winners in a competition for fresh music, Årets Urørt organized by the radio station NRK P3. The winning song named Borgerskapets utakknemlige sønner ("Ungrateful sons of the bourgeoisie"). At 25th of march, in the same year, they released their debut album La alarmane gå (Sound the alarms). The debut album won in the category of rock during Spellemannprisen 2011. They were also nominated in the category Newcomer. In 2011 they played at a festival Øyafestivalen and live on NRK TV campaign of 2011.

Drummer Anders Eikås died in a car accident on 31 January 2012.

== Members ==
Current

- Edvard Valberg – vocals, cello
- Christoffer Trædal – guitars
- Johan Hansson Liljeberg – guitars
- Tomas Berglund – bass guitar
- Nils Nilsen – drums

Former

- Mathias Johansson – organ
- Anders Eikås – drums (deceased)
- Fredrik Justnes – guitars
- Lars Emmelthun – bass
- Simen Følstad Nilsen – guitars

== Honors ==
- 2011: Spellemannprisen in the category Rock music, for the album La Alarmane Gå

== Discography ==
=== Studio albums ===
- La Alarmane Gå (2011)
- Verden Er Enkel (2013)
- Opp De Nye Blanke (2015)
- Goldenboy (2016)
- Voldelig Lyd (2017)
- Animorphs (2022)
- Soft Spot (2025)

=== EPs ===
- Honningbarna (2010)

=== Singles ===
- "Våkn opp" (2010)
- "Noen å hate" (2010)
- "Til ungdommen" (2010)
- "Den eldre garde" (2011)
- "Protokoll" (2011)
- "God jul Jesus – Bootleg Series" (2011)
- "Offerdans" (2012)
- "Fuck Kunst (Dans Dans)" (2013)
- "Police on My Back" (2013)
- "Prinser av Sarajevo" (2015)
- "Drep meg" (2016)
- "Hold an ann" (2017)
- "Sant" (2017)
- "Penthouse Perfekt" (2017)
- "Heute ist mein tag" (2024)
- "Rød bic" (2024)
- "MP5" (2025)

In 2013 they also contributed to the book Think Like a Rockstar, written by Ståle Økland.

Awards
Preceded by Kvelertak	Recipient of the Rock Spellemannprisen; 2011	Succeeded by Tommy Tokyo
