= Ingrid Olava =

Norwegian singer and musician (born 1981)

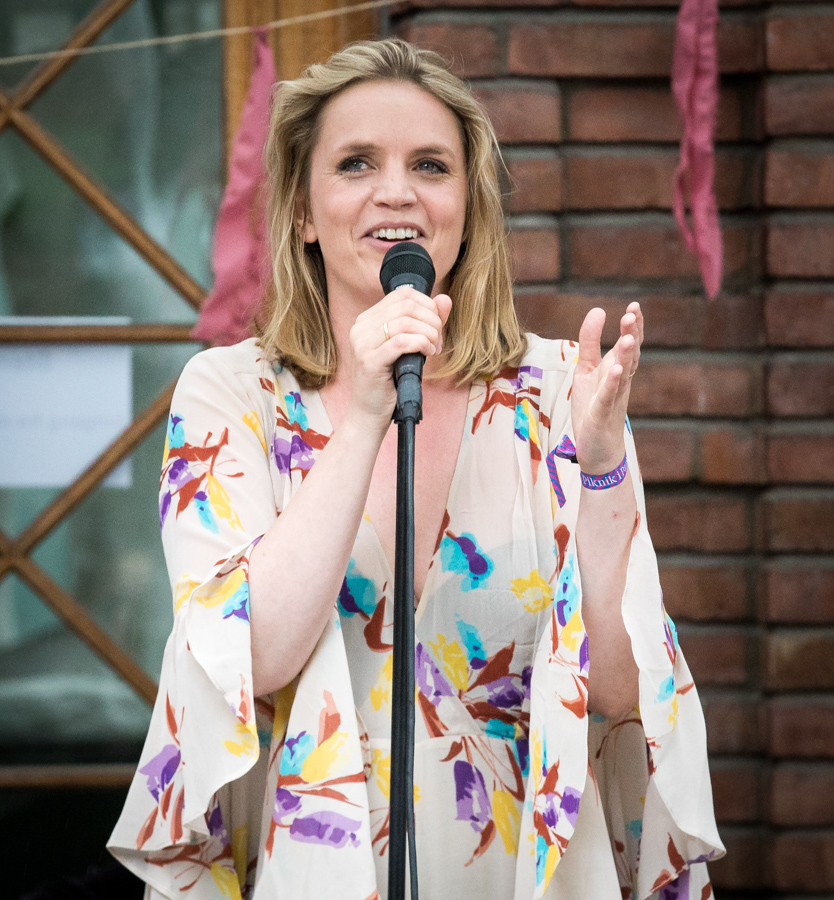
- Ingrid Olava performing in 2017

Background information
- Born: Ingrid Olava Brænd Eriksen; 18 March 1981 (age 45)
- Genres: Pop, Indie
- Occupations: Musician, singer-songwriter, actress
- Instruments: Vocals, piano

Ingrid Olava Brænd Eriksen (known as Ingrid Olava, born 18 March 1981) is a Norwegian singer, musician and actress, best known for her debut single "Only Just Begun" from 2007 and as a backup singer for Madrugada. After hearing her live performance, EMI Music Norway invited her to play in a studio, and later signed her.

== Early life ==
Ingrid Olava Brænd Eriksen grew up in Lillehammer, where she began to play on a piano in the neighbor's basement, eventually teaching herself the song "Do-Re-Mi" from The Sound of Music. She names Trond-Viggo Torgersen and Billy Joel as some of her first musical influences. She went on to play with the local Ten Sing, and became a regular performer at the Felix rock cafe in Lillehammer, where she was exposed to alternative rock and punk. At 21, she landed a major role in the NRK television drama series Det Tredje Tegnet.

== Music career ==
Ingrid Olava Brænd Eriksen was 20 years old before she began singing seriously. Her first gig was at Utøya, at a youth camp, but the first breakthrough was at a concert at the John Dee Live Club & Pub, in November 2004, where she warmed up for Vidar Vang. "I'm pretty shy, have never asked to be booked, always invited. Vidar asked me if I could play some tunes, but I did not have many. "How many do you want me to play?" "Five or six pieces," was the reply. It was about what I had, so I went home and wrote the sixth just before the concert", Brænd Eriksen said.

In the summer of 2006 Ingrid Olava played on several festivals, including the Quart Festival, the Slottsfjell Festival, Træna and KlubbØya, and was praised for several of her concerts. In the fall of 2006 Sivert Høyem and Frode Jacobsen attended one of her concerts in Oslo, the result of which was that she joined a two-month tour as supporting artist for Sivert Høyem.

Ingrid Olava Brænd Eriksen was also a member of the Lillehammer-based band Shit City, but left them in the 2007. In the summer of 2008, she played on the Hove Festival, Træna, and Øyafestivalen where she surprised with her interpretation of Leonard Cohen's classic "Take This Waltz". She has also accompanied several other Norwegian artists, such as El Cuero.

She appeared in the final minute of the season one finale of the Netflix original series Lilyhammer (2011) playing piano and singing "Back To Love" as Steve Van Zandt sat with her at the piano.

On 9 September 2012, she announced on her Facebook page that recording sessions for her third album were to begin the following day.

=== Record contract ===
After the record company EMI Music Norway heard her at a concert, they invited her to a studio with a giant grand piano, and told her to play. "At first, I played several of my own [songs]. Then I asked if they wanted to hear more. Which they did, so I continued with both my own and others' [songs]." The session resulted in a record contract and the debut album Juliet's Wishes, produced among others by Frode Jacobsen of Madrugada. Brænd Eriksen received two Spellemannprisen-nominations for the album, Newcomer of the Year and Best Pop Composition, for the song "Back to Love". The single "Only Just Begun" was first played at by:Larm in 2007, and received acclaim from both audiences and critics. According to herself, the song is inspired by "The Ballad of Bonnie and Clyde".

In 2008, she recorded a version of "Her kommer vinteren" ("Here Comes the Winter"), originally written by Joachim Nielsen and performed by Jokke & Valentinerne. The song was an unexpected success, and was put into heavy rotation on NRK P3. Brænd Eriksen subsequently made an agreement with Christopher Nielsen that all proceeds from the sales of the song would go to the Rainforest Foundation Fund.

Ingrid Olava Brænd Eriksen's second album, The Guest, produced by Frode Jacobsen and Alexander Kloster-Jensen, was released in February 2010.

Producer David Kosten produced Brænd Eriksen's third album, Summer House.

=== Releases on independent record label ===
In December 2014 Ingrid Olava Brænd Eriksen released the single "Mens jeg sover", her first independent release on her own label Daring Viola. The single was part of the soundtrack for the Norwegian documentary film Glade jul, which was shown on the Norwegian broadcaster NRK1 in December 2014.

In October 2016 Ingrid Olava Brænd Eriksen released the EP HEKT, which consists of three songs. The EP was released on Brænd Eriksen's own, independent label. In November 2017 Brænd Eriksen released the album HEKT, available in digital music stores. In 2018 Ingrid Olava and pianist Andreas Ulvo will release the album Innlandet on 16 March 2018.

== Discography ==
=== Albums ===
- Juliet's Wishes – 31 March 2008
- The Guest – 15 February 2010
- Summer House – 6 September 2013
- HEKT – 10 November 2017

=== Extended plays ===
- HEKT – 1 October 2016

=== Singles ===
- "Only Just Begun" – 2007, on sale from 4 February 2008
- "Back to Love" – 2008, on sale from 11 April 2008
- "Warrior Song" – 2009, on sale from 5 October 2009
- "Black Box" – 2013, on sale from 1 March 2013
- "Jackie Kennedy" – 2013, on sale from 26 April 2013
- "Mens jeg sover" – 2014, on sale from 19 December 2014
- "From Up Here" – 2017, on sale from 17 February 2017
- "Jupiter" – 2017, on sale from 10 March 2017

=== Other ===
Ingrid Olava has collaborated with other artists in these albums:

- Stand Up Straight- Vidar Vang & The Northern Men, 2004 (vocals, choirs)
- In Glorious Mono- Various Artists – 2006 (also wrote the texts in which)
- Exiles- Sivert Høyem 2006 (chorus)
- Animated People's Republic- Lukas Kasha 2007 (vocals)
- El Cuero- El Cuero 2007 (vocals)
- Madrugada- Madrugada 2007 (chorus)
- El Cuero- A Glimmer of Hope 2008 (vocals)
- The White Birch – The Weight of Spring 2015 (vocals)

Awards
Preceded by Noora Noor	Recipient of the best Female Pop Solo Artist Spellemannprisen; 2010	Succeeded by Ane Brun
