= Erland Dahlen =

Norwegian drummer and percussionist

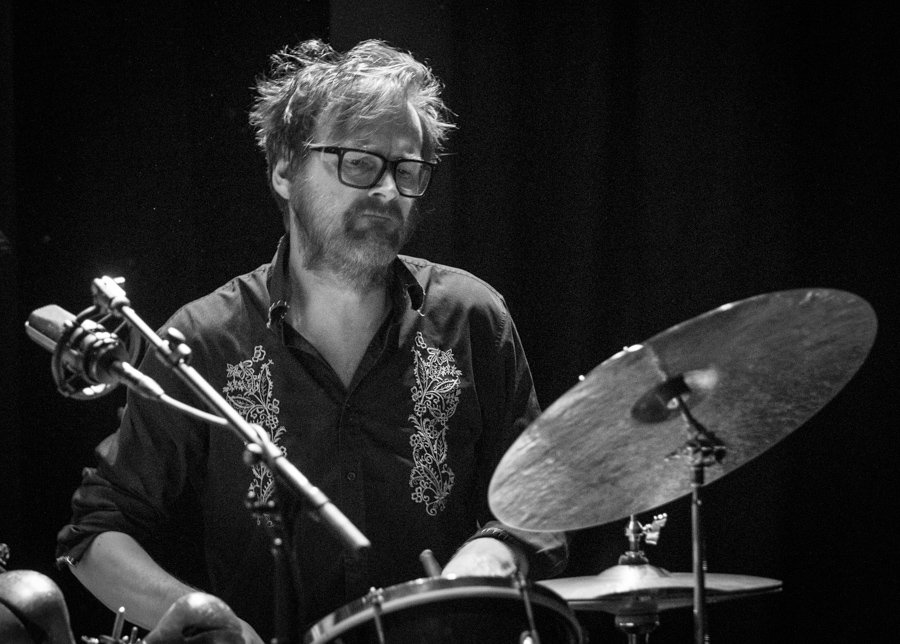
- At the 2017 Oslo Jazzfestival

Background information
- Born: 15 May 1971 (age 55); Ulefoss, Telemark
- Origin: Norway
- Genres: Jazz
- Occupations: Musician and composer
- Instruments: Drums, percussion

Erland Dahlen (born 15 May 1971 in Ulefoss, Norway) is a Norwegian drummer and percussionist. He is a member of several bands in the elektronika/jazz/experimental music genre, like "HET", "Boschamaz", "Kiruna", "Morris" and "Piston Ltd."

== Career ==
Dahlen is a widely used studio and live musician in Norway. From 2005 to 2008 he was a semi-permanent drummer for Madrugada and contributed in the albums The Deep End, Live at Tralfamadore and Madrugada as well as live shows. In addition, he has contributed on albums with, among others, Kaada MECD (2004) and Music For Moviebikers (2006), Odd Nordstoga Heim te Mor (2006) and Pilegrim (2008), Hanne Hukkelberg Little Things fra 2004), Rykestrasse 68 (2006) and Blood From A Stone (2009), Marit Larsen Under the Surface (2006), Xploding Plastix Treated Timber Resists Rot (2008) and Bjørn Eidsvåg Pust (2008). In 2012 he released his first solo album Rolling Bomber.

== Honors ==
- 2010: Gammleng-prisen in the class Studio musician

== Discography ==
=== Solo albums ===
- 2012: Rolling Bomber (Hubro Music)
- 2015: Blossom Bells (Hubro Music)
- 2017: Clocks (Hubro Music)
- 2020: Bones (Hubro Music)
- 2023 Racoons

=== Collaborative works ===
With Kaada

- 2004: MECD (Warner Music)
- 2006: Music For Moviebikers (Warner Music)

With Hanne Hukkelberg

- 2004: Little Things (Propeller Recordings)
- 2007: Rykestrasse 68 (Propeller Recordings)
- 2009: Blood From A Stone (Propeller Recordings)

With Ragnar Sør Olsen

- 2004: Dagane (Nyrenning)

With Madrugada

- 2005: The Deep End (EMI Music, Norway)
- 2005: Live at Tralfamadore (EMI Music, Virgin Records)
- 2008: Madrugada (EMI Music)

With Odd Nordstoga

- 2006: Heim te Mor (Universal Music, Norway)
- 2008: Pilegrim (Sonet Music)

With Charlotte & The Co-Stars

- 2009: Win Love Win (Propeller Recordings)

With Marit Larsen

- 2006: Under the Surface (Virgin Records, EMI Music, Norway)

With Xploding Plastix

- 2008: Treated Timber Resists Rot (Beatservice Records)

With Bjørn Eidsvåg

- 2008: Pust (Petroleum Records)

With Eivind Aarset & The Sonic Codex Orchestra

- 2010: Live Extracts (Jazzland Recordings)

With Batagraf

- 2012: Say And Play (ECM Records)

With Stian Westerhus & Pale Horses

- 2014: Maelstrom (Rune Grammofon)

With Nils Petter Molvær

- 2014: Switch (OKeh Records)
- 2016: Buoyancy (OKeh Records)

With Anneli Drecker

- 2015: Rocks And Straws (Rune Grammofon)
- 2017: Revelation For Personal Use (Rune Grammofon)

Preceded by Kåre Christoffer Vestrheim & Dorthe Dreier	Recipient of the Gammleng-prisen Studio award 2010	Succeeded by Yngve Sætre & Frank Brodahl
