= Du betyr meg =

Studio album by Lars Vaular
- Released: 31 October 2011
- Genre: Hip hop
- Length: 44:04
- Language: Norwegian

Lars Vaular chronology
Helt om natten, helt om dagen (2010)	Du betyr meg (2011)

Singles from Du betyr meg
- 1. "Som i en siste dans" Released: 23 October 2011

Professional ratings
Review scores
Source	Rating
Aftenposten	5/6 stars
Dagbladet	5/6 stars
Verdens Gang	5/6 stars

Du betyr meg is an album by Norwegian rapper Lars Vaular. It was released on 31 October 2011. The first single from the album, "Som i en siste dans", was released on 23 October 2011.

== Track listing ==
No.	Title	Length
1.	"Aldri for pen for pønk"	3:01
2.	"Nedi byen"	3:55
3.	"Supernaiv" (featuring Thea Hjelmeland)	3:06
4.	"Hundre sanger" (featuring Wang from Fjorden Baby!)	4:02
5.	"Tåken"	2:21
6.	"I disse dager"	5:12
7.	"Når eg kommer hem" (featuring Stone P and Vågard from A-Laget)	4:41
8.	"Ninja"	3:37
9.	"I min leilighet" (featuring Onkl P, Vågard from A-Laget, and Flex from Muren)	5:45
10.	"Som i en siste dans" (featuring John Olav Nilsen)	3:09
11.	"Frykten" (featuring L.O.C.)	5:20

== Charts ==
Chart	Peak position
Norwegian Albums (VG-lista)	5
