= Vidar Vang =

Norwegian songwriter and musician (born 1976)

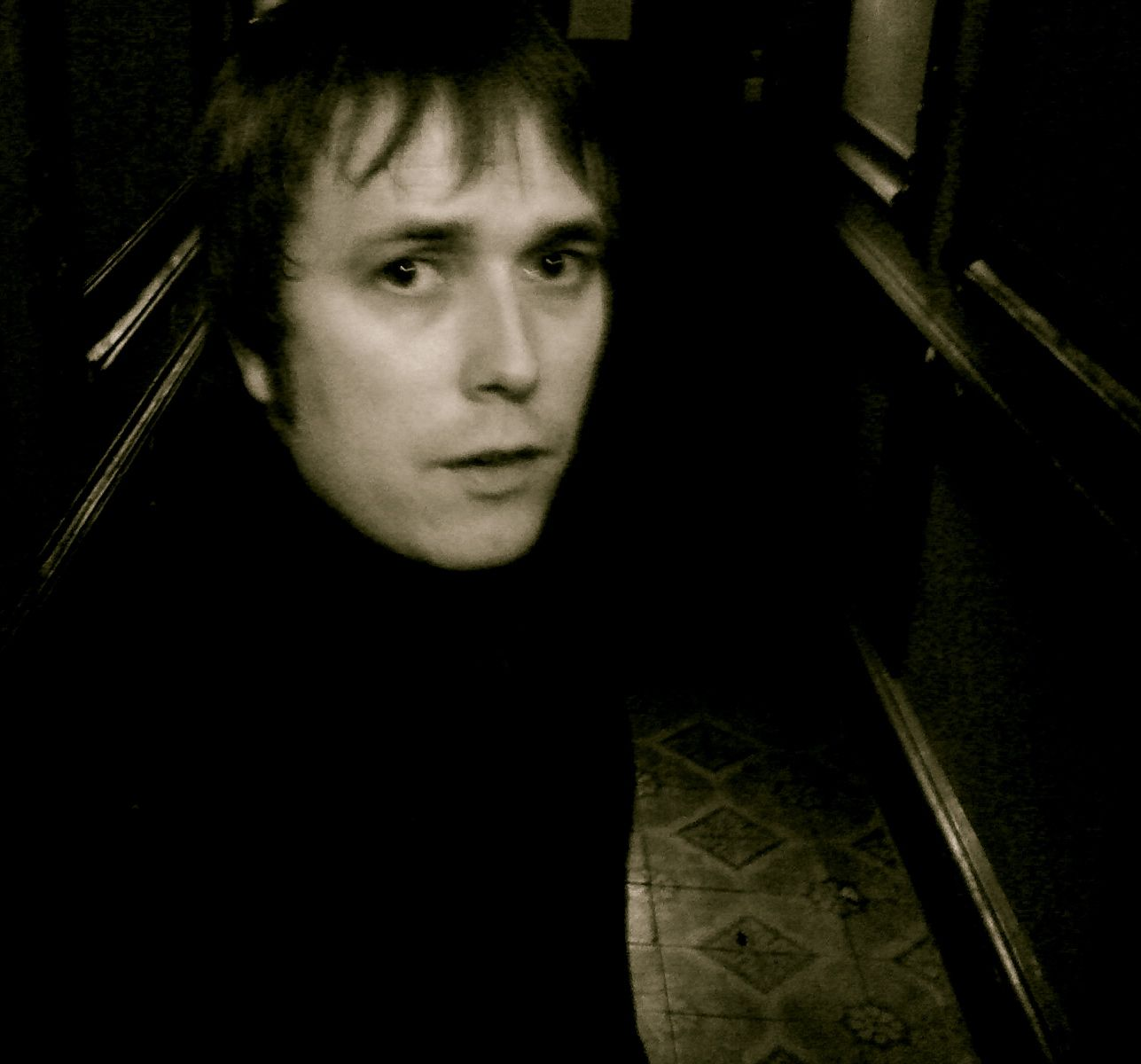

Background information
- Born: Vidar Andre Vang; 22 September 1976 (age 49); Bjerkvik, Norway
- Genres: Rock, folk, acoustic
- Occupation(s): Musician, singer-songwriter
- Instrument(s): Guitar, harmonica, vocals
- Years active: 1998–present
- Website: vidarvang.com

Vidar Jusnes Vang (born 22 September 1976) is a Norwegian songwriter and musician. He has recorded more than a dozen albums.

== Early life ==
Vidar Vang grew up in Bjerkvik, in Northern Norway. He started to write songs in his teens.

== Musical career ==
In 1998, Vidar Vang released his unofficial debut album Blue, recorded in his hometown Bjerkvik. The album was sold at concerts throughout northern Norway.

In late 1999, Vang recorded his first demo with a band, at Hønsehuset Studio in Bodø. This demo gave him and his band the opportunity to play by:Larm in Bergen in 2000, and the Norwegian Wood festival in Oslo the following summer. In August 2000, Vang moved to Oslo. In 2001, after playing by:Larm in Tromsø, the Quart Festival and the main stage at Norwegian Wood, he got signed to EMI. Vidar Vang and his band went on their first Norwegian tour in late 2001, before they entered Juke Joint Studio at Notodden, together with producers Seasick Steve and Cato “Salsa” Thomassen to record his official debut album. In September 2002, Vang made his official recording debut releasing the album Rodeo. Rodeo received a Norwegian Grammy nomination the year after. The single "Under Six Strings" has become one of Vang’s signature songs.

In 2004, Vang released the follow-up to Rodeo, Stand Up Straight. Vang's band, childhood friends from Bjerkvik and Bodø, now had become The Northern Men. "Here It Is" was released as a single and received extensive radio play in the fall of 2004. The album songs "Happy", and the duet with Ingrid Olava "Highways of My Mind", were also released as singles. On the eponymous Vidar Vang (2006), Vang recorded his songs with a more acoustic sound than on previous albums. Vidar and The Northern Men went separate ways in 2005 and Vang subsequently recorded with other musicians. The single "Stand Up" is one of Vang’s most known and played songs. Before and after the release of Vidar Vang, Vang toured Norway and Sweden, and also supported The Waterboys and Madrugada on their European tours.

In 2010, Vang released his fifth album, Sleepless Songs, produced by Frode Jacobsen and Alexander Kloster-Jensen. Album singles were "10 Below" and the duet "Love, Love, Love" with Tift Merritt.

On Sidewalk Silhouettes (2012), Vang recorded 18 songs alone with his guitar, before him and his producer, Cato “Salsa” Thomassen, overdubbed them lightly with old, analog synthesizers, sparse drum machines and electric guitars. Starting with the 2015 album Vårres egen lille krig, he dropped English as the primary language and switched to his native Norwegian.

== Discography ==
Albums

- Blue (1998)
- Rodeo (2002) (also on limited edition vinyl plus CD with five bonus tracks)
- Stand Up Straight (2004)
- Vidar Vang (2006)
- Sleepless Songs (2010)
- Sidewalk Silhouettes (2012)
- Vårres egen lille krig (2015)
- 8530 Bjerkvik (2018)
- 9 Viser (2018)
- Mann fra Nord (2019)
- Sidewalk Silhouettes Vol. 2: "The Hønsehuset Tapes (1999-2000)" (2020)
- Sidewalk Silhouettes Vol. 3: "Demos & Outtakes (1998-2005)" (2020)
- Sidewalk Silhouettes Vol. 4: "Cementen, Stavanger, 05.05.2006" (2020) (Live album)
- Vidar Vang & Bandet (2022)

EPs

- Vidar Vang & friemann (2001)
- Under Six Strings (2002)
