= El Cuero (album) =

Studio album by El Cuero
- Released: 15 August 2007
- Recorded: 2007 at Caliban Studios, Oslo
- Genre: Roots rock
- Length: 56:34
- Label: Indie Distribution
- Producer: El Cuero & Ole Petter Andreassen

El Cuero chronology
El Cuero (2007)	A Glimmer of Hope (2008)

El Cuero is the debut studio album by Norwegian rock group El Cuero, released on 15 August 2007.

== Track listing ==
All music and lyrics by Brynjar Takle Ohr unless stated otherwise.

1. Is This Over - 6:58 (Brynjar & Håvard Takle Ohr)
2. I Hate Myself (For Loving You) - 3:50 (Øyvind Blomstrøm & Brynjar Takle Ohr)
3. My Roving Eye - 3:58
4. When I Slip Away - 5:05
5. Did I Know You - 12:22
6. Did You See Them - 4:16
7. Hate Will Get Us Nowhere - 3:34
8. If You'll Follow - 5:07
9. Ain't It Hard - 4:20
10. Little Bird - 7:25

== Personnel ==
=== El Cuero ===
- Brynjar Takle Ohr - lead vocals, guitars, piano on "When The Lights Go Out"
- Tommy Reite - bass guitar
- Håvard Takle Ohr - drums, backing vocals
- Øyvind Blomstrøm - lead guitars, pedal steel, piano and backing vocals

=== Additional musicians ===
- Ingrid Olava - vocals on "I Hate Myself (For Loving You)"
- Inge Svegge - hammond organ
