= Fjorden Baby =

Norwegian Band

Fjorden Baby!
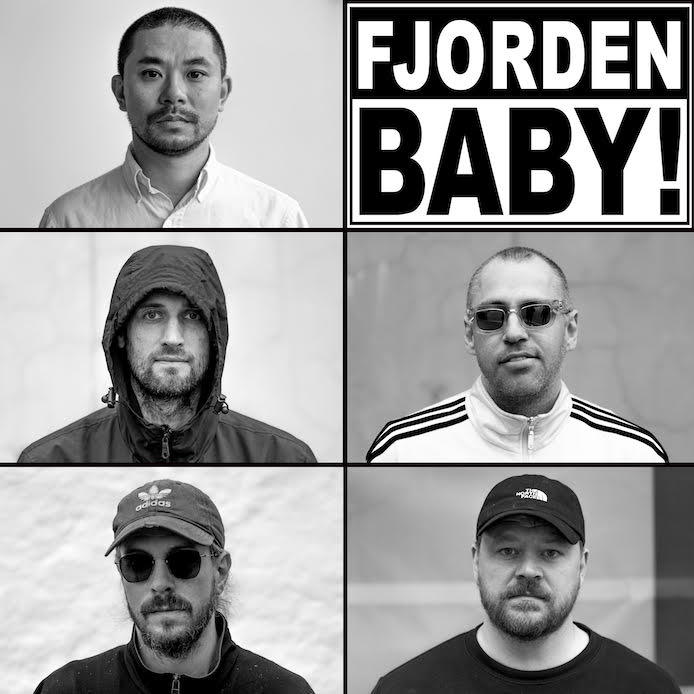
- Fjorden Baby! circa 2021; from left to right: Nam Phuong Nguyen, Jan Henning Buen, Sturle Kvilekval, Jan Eivind Bertelsen, Kjetil Grimsby Haar

Background information
- Origin: Bergen, Norway
- Genres: experimental rock; post-punk; new wave
- Years active: 2005–present
- Labels: Opplett; Sony Music Norway; Fjorden Bizznizz
- Members: Jan Eivind Bertelsen; Jan Henning Buen; Kjetil Grimsby Haarr; Nam Phuong Nguyen; Sturle Kvilekval
- Past members: Tony Alexander Storm

Fjorden Baby, stylised as Fjorden Baby!, is a Norwegian rock band formed in Loddefjord, Bergen in 2005 by drummer Jan Eivind Bertelsen, bassist Tony Alexander Storm (formerly Syversen), guitarist Jan Henning "Flemmet" Buen, keyboardist Nam Phoung Nguyen and vocalist Sturle Kvilekval.

The band plays experimental rock in Norwegian. While many of their influences stem from music with English lyrics, their goal has been stated to make Norwegian lyrics sound as cool as English lyrics and to represent the urban culture of their home. Likewise, they intend to treat music as an international language that can be understood and enjoyed regardless of the languages of the listener. They incorporate Norwegian verse with the influence of their native Loddefjord rap, punk and the early Bergen new wave.

In the autumn of 2009, Storm chose to leave the band as a songwriter and bassist. He was replaced by Kjetil Grimsby Haarr as bassist.

== History ==
=== The first album ===
On February 2 in 2009, the band released their debut album Fjorden Baby! on Mikal Tellé's label Opplett. It was distributed by VME. The album contains two songs recorded in Duper Studio with Yngve Sætre as the producer. The album was recorded live and several of the songs were created in the span between 2005 and 2007.

Fjorden Baby! came in second in the 2009 Urørt final.The winner was Pony the Pirate.

In August 2009, Tony Alexander Storm left the band, and he was replaced by Kjetil Grimsby Haarr. Storm's last concert took place at the main stage on Øyafestivalen-09.

=== Se deg rundt i rommet ===
The second album Se deg rundt i rommet was released on the band's own record company, Fjorden Biznizz, in March 2011. The album contains the singles “Rendezvous” and “Himmelen”, both songs were recorded on New Year's Day 2009, and included the hit “Karoline” from the band's first album. The last song on the album was created during 2007–2008.

The Album rose to 3rd place on the VG-lista.

When the football team SK Brann played in the final of the 2011 Norwegian Football Cup, Fjorden Baby! Recorded the song “Republikken” with a rap verse from the football player Rodolph Austin. The song is inspired by New Order's song “World in Motion...” which became a football classic in England.

=== Fjordkloden ===
The album Fjordkloden was released in 2013 with “Tingene” as the lead single. It was well received. Additionally, the Bergen rapper Lars Vaular appears with a guest verse on the song “11 estasje”. VG named the album Årets Norske Album in November of the same year. The song on the album consisted of old and new songs between the years 2005 to 2014.

=== Oh Yeah! ===
The album Oh Yeah!, was released in 2015 and, likewise, received critical praise. The single “Igjen og igjen” featured guest from the Loddefjord musician John Olav Nilsen.

=== Rockebyen ===
Their fourth album, Rockebyen, was released 9 years later in 2024. The artwork was made by Nam Nguyen and Jon Mannsåker.

== Band members ==
=== Current members ===
- Sturle Kvilekval – Vocals (2005–present)
- Jan Eivind Bertelsen – Drummer (2005–present)
- Kjetil Grimsby Haarr – Bass (2009–present)
- Jan Henning Buen – Guitar (2005–Present)
- Nam Phuong Nguyen – Synth (2005–present)

=== Former members ===
- Tony Alexander Storm – Bass (2005–2009)

== Discography ==
=== Studio albums ===
- Fjorden Baby! (2009)
- Se deg rundt i rommet (2011)
- Fjordkloden (2013)
- Oh Yeah! (2015)
- Rockebyen (2024)

=== Singles & EPs ===
- Republikken (2011)
- Deigen (2011)
- Himmelen (2011)
- Rasputin (2013)
- Tingene (2013)
- Kagjørdundodåeh (Version) (2013)
- Igjen og igjen (2015)
- Har en drøm (2015)
- Flashback (2015)
- NTCH (2019)
- NTCH (Remixes) (2019)
- Ikkje bland deg inn (2021)
- Back in a Maybach (2024)
- Spinner Wild (2024)
- Discodancer (2024)
- i-landsproblemer (2026)
