= Lioness (Sivert Høyem album) =

- Lioness album cover

Studio album by Sivert Høyem
- Released: January 29th, 2016
- Genre: Rock
- Length: 41:08
- Label: HK Grammofon
- Producer: Sivert Høyem, Christer Knutsen, Bjarne Stensli

Professional ratings
Review scores
Source	Rating
AllMusic	4.5/5 stars

Lioness is the sixth studio album by Norwegian rock musician Sivert Høyem, released in 2016.

== Track listing ==
No.	Title	Length
1.	"Sleepwalking Man"	4:02
2.	"Fool to Your Crown"	4:28
3.	"Lioness"	4:35
4.	"It Belongs to Me"	3:56
5.	"My Thieving Heart" (featuring Marie Monroe)	4:11
6.	"V - O - I - D"	3:28
7.	"The Boss Bossa Nova"	5:12
8.	"Oh, Spider!"	3:40
9.	"The Riviera of Hades"	4:08
10.	"Silences"	3:28
Total length:		41:08

== Personnel ==
- Sivert Høyem – vocals, guitar (acoustic), composition, arrangement, production
- Øystein Frantzvåg – bass guitar, double bass, guitar (baritone)
- Christer Knutsen – guitar (electric), hi string guitar (acoustic), marxophone, organ, piano, celeste, vocals (backing), composition, arrangement, production, engineering
- Børge Fjordheim – drums, percussion

Guest musicians

- Marie Monroe - Vocals (track 5)
- Cato Salsa - Guitar (electric)
- Inga Byrkjeland - Cello
- Tove Margrethe Falkenberg Erikstad - Cello
- Audun Sandvik - Cello
- Jon Wien Sønstebø - Viola
- Nora Taksdal - Viola
- Bjarne Magnus Jensen - Violin
- Andre Orvik - Violin
- Morten Barrikmo Engebretsen - Clarinet (bass)

Production

- Jan Martin Smørdal - Conductor, string arrangements
- Bjarne Stensli - Engineering, production
- Tchad Blake - Mixing
- Greg Calbi - Mastering
- Bjørn Opsahl - Photography
- Desiree Mattsson Margaret - Sleeve photo

== Charts ==
Chart	Peak position
Belgian Albums Chart (Ultratop)	123
Dutch Albums Chart (MegaCharts)	75
Norwegian Albums Chart (VG-lista)	1
Swiss Albums Chart (Swiss Hitparade)	42
