= Helt om natten, helt om dagen =

Studio album by Lars Vaular
- Released: 2010
- Genre: Hip hop
- Length: 53:54
- Language: Norwegian
- Producer: Girson Felix Dos Santos Dias, Lars Vaular, Leo Ajkic

Lars Vaular chronology
D'e Glede (2009)	Helt om natten, helt om dagen (2010)	Du betyr meg (2011)

Professional ratings
Review scores
Source	Rating
Dagbladet	5/6 stars
Dagsavisen	5/6 stars
Lydverket	5/6 stars
Natt og Dag	6/6 stars
Oslopuls	5/6 stars
VG Nett	4/6 stars

Helt om natten, helt om dagen is an album by Norwegian rapper Lars Vaular. It was released in 2010. The album entered the VG-lista on 3 May at #27, peaking the next week at #3, and staying in the Top 50 until the beginning of September. The album won the Spellemannprisen in 2010 in the hip hop category.

== Track listing ==
No.	Title	Length
1.	"Alt eg har å si"	1:39
2.	"Neeei"	3:37
3.	"Lille rapper"	4:50
4.	"En eneste"	3:35
5.	"På tide"	1:51
6.	"Kem skjøt Siv Jensen"	3:26
7.	"Utenfor Oslo, utenfor overalt" (featuring Nephew)	4:23
8.	"Rett opp og ned"	3:18
9.	"Supermaria"	1:40
10.	"En av oss to" (featuring Thea Hjelmeland)	3:47
11.	"Klokken fem om natten" (featuring G-Side)	3:55
12.	"Synger på siste verset" (featuring Pete'n and Verk)	4:37
13.	"Leah" (featuring Verk and Bjørn Eidsvåg)	4:30
14.	"Helt om natten, helt om dagen" (featuring Jesse Jones)	3:54
15.	"Julaften"	4:47

Bonus tracks
No.	Title	Length
16.	"Solbriller på"	2:12
17.	"Gi meg no bass"	4:14

== Charting ==
Chart	Peak position
Norwegian Albums (VG-lista)	3
