= Drevland =

Drevland is a surname of Norwegian origin. Notable people with the surname include:

- Jørun Drevland (born 1944), Norwegian politician
- Tobias Drevland Lund (born 1996), Norwegian politician
- Trude Drevland (born 1947), Norwegian politician
