= Only Just Begun =

Only Just Begun may refer to:

- "Only Just Begun", a 2007 song by Ingrid Olava
- "Only Just Begun", a 2014 song by Samantha Mumba
