= Industrial Silence =

Studio album by Madrugada
- Released: 30 August 1999; 5 July 2010 (reissue)
- Recorded: 1998, 1999
- Studio: Athletic Sound Studio, Halden; Disclab, Oslo; Watermusic, Hoboken
- Genre: Alternative rock
- Length: 63:43
- Label: Virgin
- Producer: Kai Andersen; Madrugada

Madrugada chronology
Industrial Silence (1999)	The Nightly Disease (2001)

Professional ratings
Review scores
Source	Rating
Allmusic	3/5 stars
Panorama.no	5/6 stars

Industrial Silence is the debut album by Norwegian alternative rock band Madrugada, released on 30 August 1999. Produced by Kai Andersen and the band, the album contains the singles "Electric", "Higher" and "Beautyproof", in addition to the live staple "Vocal". A limited edition featuring a second disc containing three songs was initially released alongside the album. The band won the Norwegian Spellemann Award in the Rock category for the album in 2000, in addition to being nominated in the Newcomer of the Year category.

A fully remastered deluxe edition of the album was released on 5 July 2010, with an additional disc that included all tracks from the band's early EP's, B-sides and four previously unheard demo recordings. The remaster was carried out by Greg Calbi at Sterling Sound in New York.

As of 2002, the album has sold 250,000 copies according to Billboard.

== Track listing ==
All lyrics are written by Sivert Høyem; all music is composed by Madrugada.

No.	Title	Length
1.	"Vocal"	6:28
2.	"Beautyproof"	3:57
3.	"Shine"	4:14
4.	"Higher"	4:47
5.	"Sirens"	6:16
6.	"Strange Colour Blue"	5:06
7.	"This Old House"	5:07
8.	"Electric"	4:55
9.	"Salt"	4:53
10.	"Belladonna"	4:21
11.	"Norwegian Hammerworks Corp."	5:28
12.	"Quite Emotional"	4:18
13.	"Terraplane"	4:05
Total length:		63:43

Limited edition (Disc 2)
No.	Title	Length
1.	"Wheelchair"	4:32
2.	"Move"	4:12
3.	"Sweet Simone" (live demo version)	4:13

Deluxe edition (Disc 2)
No.	Title	Length
1.	"Wheelchair"	4:32
2.	"Move"	4:12
3.	"Sweet Simone" (live demo)	4:13
4.	"Strange Colour Blue" (alternative version)	4:31
5.	"Highway 2.000.000"	4:10
6.	"Oceanliner"	4:47
7.	"The Riverbed"	4:45
8.	"Tonight I Have No Words For You"	4:57
9.	"1990"	3:15
10.	"I'm Life's Wonderful Way Of Letting You Down"	4:12
11.	"Bill Skins Fifth"	3:27
12.	"Mother of Earth"	4:22
13.	"Legends and Bones" (from The Shit City Sessions)	3:12
14.	"Step Into My Mirror"	3:01
15.	"Hush Sleep Tonight" (1996 demo)	3:41
16.	"Shine" (1996 demo)	4:05
17.	"I'm In Love With You"	4:31
18.	"This Must Be The Song That Will Pay My Bills" (demo)	5:09

== Personnel ==
Madrugada

- Robert S. Burås – guitars, harmonica, production, cover design, photography
- Sivert Høyem – vocals, production, cover design
- Frode Jacobsen – bass guitar, production, engineer (track 13), cover design, photography
- Jon Lauvland Pettersen – drums, percussion, production, cover design, photography

Additional personnel

- Jon Terje Rovedal – electric piano (track 2), electric organ (track 7, 8, 9, 11)
- Ole Henrik Moe – violin (track 3), saw (track 11)
- Bob Egan – lap steel guitar (track 3), pedal steel guitar (track 4, 5, 7, 8, 10)
- Kai Andersen – production, engineering
- Hans Olav Grøttheim – engineering
- John Agnello – mixing
- Chris Mazer – engineering, mixing assistant
- Dan – mixing assistant
- Wild Wes – mixing assistant
- Greg Calbi – mastering
- Alen – cover design
- Jacob Normann Jacobsen – photography
- Raymond Mosken – photography

== Certifications ==
Region	Certification	Certified units/sales
Norway (IFPI Norway)	Platinum	50,000^{*}
Summaries
France & Germany	—	50,000
Worldwide	—	250,000
^{*} Sales figures based on certification alone.
