= Robert Burås =

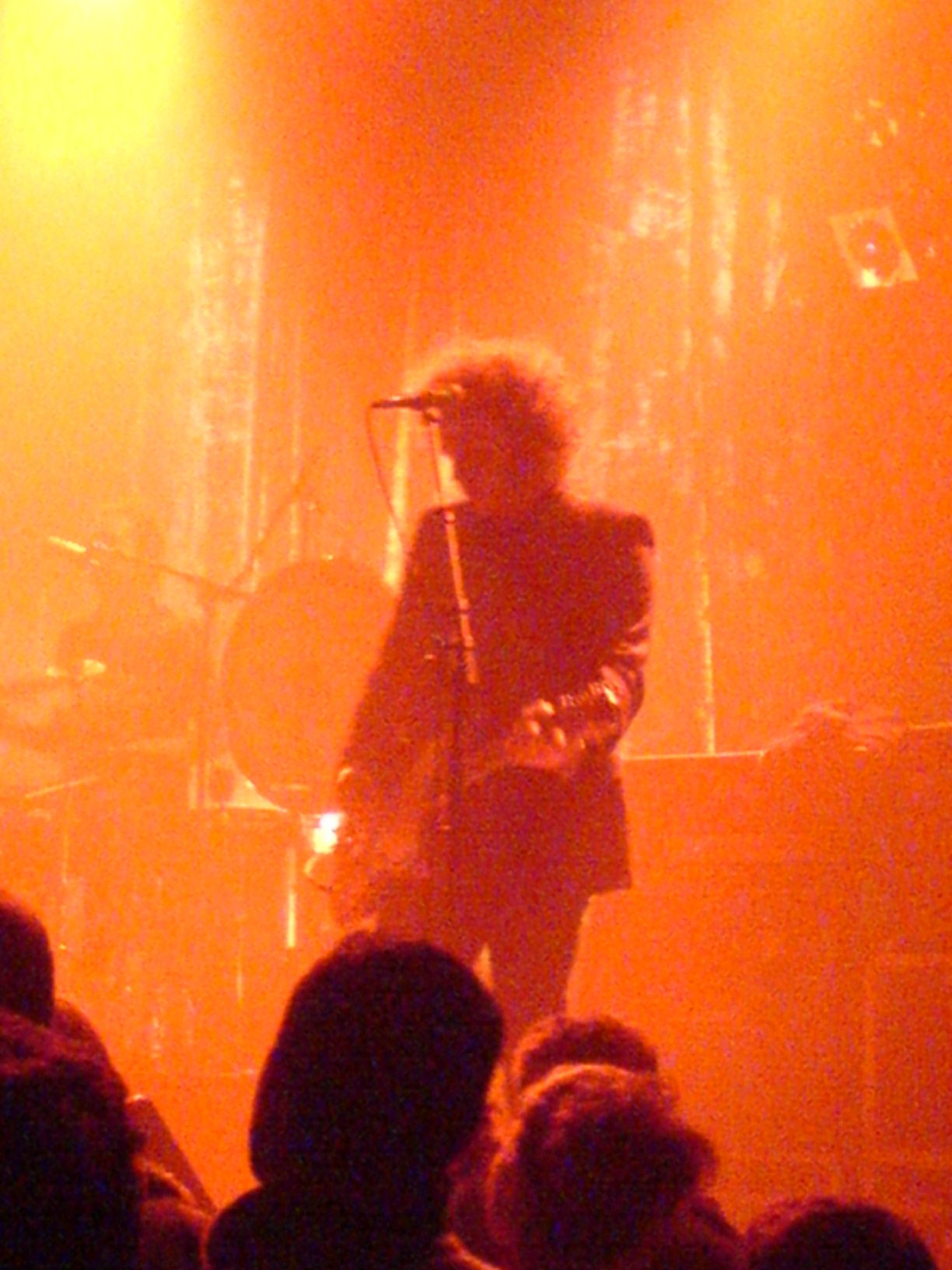
- Burås during a concert in 2005.

Background information
- Born: Robert Solli Burås; 12 August 1975; Narvik, Norway
- Died: 12 July 2007 (aged 31) Oslo, Norway
- Genres: Alternative rock
- Occupations: Musician, singer-songwriter
- Instruments: Guitar, vocals
- Years active: 1995–2007
- Label: EMI
- Formerly of: Madrugada; My Midnight Creeps

Robert Solli Burås (12 August 1975 – 12 July 2007) was a Norwegian musician and songwriter, best known as the guitarist for the rock band Madrugada. He was also the frontman and guitarist for the rock band My Midnight Creeps. Burås appeared on five studio albums with Madrugada and two releases with My Midnight Creeps. He is the winner of six Norwegian Spellemann Awards, five with Madrugada and one with My Midnight Creeps.

Burås died on 12 July 2007 and was found in his apartment by a friend. After a ceremony in Sofienberg Church in Oslo, he was cremated. His ashes lie at Bjerkvik Cemetery in Nordland, Norway. In the summer of 2008, a memorial bench to commemorate Burås was unveiled in the Birkelunden park in Oslo.

== Early life ==
Burås' first contact with rock music came at age twelve when he received a mix tape which included Led Zeppelin's "Rock and Roll" as the first track. In later years, he mentioned the song as a favourite of his.

== Madrugada ==
After playing in local bands with friends and schoolmates in his adolescent years, he formed Abby's Adoption with drummer John Lauvland Pettersen and bass player Frode Jacobsen. The three teamed up with singer Sivert Høyem, changed their name to Madrugada and relocated to Oslo shortly after that. Madrugada's debut EP was released in 1998.

== My Midnight Creeps ==
Robert Burås founded My Midnight Creeps in 2005 in which he performed as lead singer/guitarist as well as fronting the band and writing the majority of the material. They released two albums: the eponymous My Midnight Creeps (2005) and Histamin (2007).

== Instruments ==
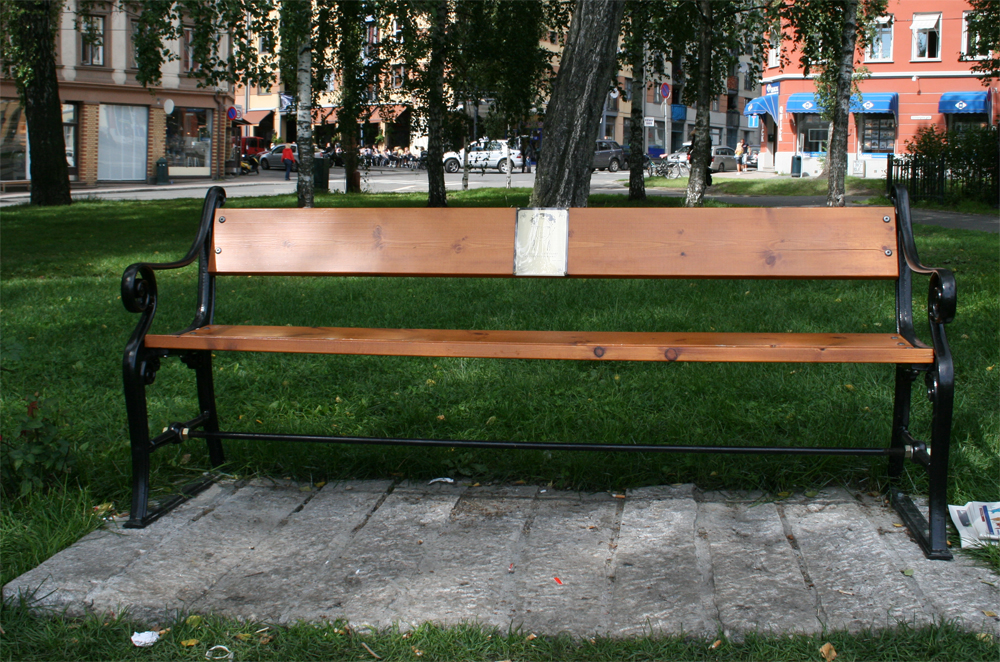
Burås' memorial bench in the Birkelunden park in Oslo

Burås' instrument of choice throughout his career with Madrugada was a 1966 vintage, Candy Apple Red, Fender Jazzmaster. The guitar was placed on top of the coffin during his funeral service. Burås also used a sunburst Fender Stratocaster and a black Gibson Les Paul Custom extensively, and performed mostly with a brown Gibson ES-345 during later years with My Midnight Creeps. In addition to guitar, he also played the harmonica, electric mandolin and occasionally piano.

== Discography ==
=== With Madrugada ===
==== Studio albums ====
- Industrial Silence (1999)
- The Nightly Disease (2001)
- Grit (2002)
- The Deep End (2005)
- Madrugada (2008)

=== With My Midnight Creeps ===
==== Studio albums ====
- My Midnight Creeps (2005)
- Histamin (2007)
