= Madrugada (Madrugada album) =

Studio album by Madrugada
- Released: 21 January 2008
- Studio: Water Music, New Jersey; Svenska Grammofonstudion, Gothenburg; Magic Shop, New York City
- Genre: Alternative rock, symphonic rock
- Length: 48:19
- Label: Malabar Recording Company, EMI, Virgin
- Producer: Madrugada

Madrugada chronology
Live at Tralfamadore (2005)	Madrugada (2008)	Chimes At Midnight (2022)

Madrugada is the fifth studio album by the Norwegian band Madrugada, released on 21 January 2008. Produced by the band, the album is the final to feature guitarist Robert Burås, who died suddenly on 12 July 2007 during the recording process, and their last before splitting up at the end of 2008. The album is dedicated to Burås and Høyem's father, Asbjørn, who also died in 2007.

Following Burås' death, vocalist Sivert Høyem and bassist Frode Jacobsen soon decided to continue with the completion of the release. The majority of Burås' guitar parts had been recorded when he died, and the rest of Madrugada stated that finishing the album was like therapy for them. Madrugada was largely recorded during May 2007 at Water Music Studios in Hoboken, New Jersey, with additional recordings at the Magic Shop in New York City and Svenska Grammofon Studio in Gothenburg. The album sold 82,400 copies in Norway during its first year of release.

After the release of the album, the band announced that they would embark on a final tour before splitting up and performed their last concert on 15 November 2008 at Oslo Spektrum. In June 2018, it was announced that Høyem, Jacobsen and original drummer Jon Lauvland Pettersen had reformed the band for a series of shows in 2019. The band released their sixth studio album, Chimes at Midnight, in 2022.

== Track listing ==
All lyrics are written by Sivert Høyem, except track 9 by Robert Burås; all music is composed by Madrugada, except track 9 by Burås

No.	Title	Length
1.	"Whatever Happened To You?"	5:40
2.	"The Hour of the Wolf"	4:29
3.	"Look Away Lucifer"	5:13
4.	"Honey Bee"	5:35
5.	"New Woman/New Man"	4:22
6.	"What's on Your Mind?"	4:03
7.	"Highway of Light"	6:38
8.	"Valley of Deception"	5:09
9.	"Our Time Won't Live That Long"	5:55
Total length:		48:19
