= The Nightly Disease =

Studio album by Madrugada
- Released: 20 December 2001
- Recorded: 25 August – 11 October 2000
- Studio: Water Music Recorders, New Jersey
- Genre: Alternative rock
- Length: 64:55
- Label: Virgin
- Producer: John Agnello; Madrugada

Madrugada chronology
Industrial Silence (1999)	The Nightly Disease (2001)	Grit (2002)

Professional ratings
Review scores
Source	Rating
Allmusic	link
Panorama.no	link

The Nightly Disease is the second album by the Norwegian alternative rock band Madrugada, released on 20 December 2001. Produced by John Agnello and the band, the album is regarded as a darker record than their debut Industrial Silence and has been described as 'depression caught on tape'. In 2011, the album was remastered by Greg Calbi and re-issued with a bonus disc featuring much unreleased and unheard material.

== Track listing ==
All lyrics are written by Sivert Høyem, except track 2 by Høyem and Robert Burås; all music is composed by Madrugada.

No.	Title	Length
1.	"Black Mambo"	5:56
2.	"Step into This Room and Dance for Me"	5:13
3.	"Nightly Disease, Pt. II"	3:29
4.	"Lucy One"	4:49
5.	"Hands Up – I Love You"	5:36
6.	"A Deadend Mind"	4:52
7.	"The Frontman"	4:43
8.	"We Are Go"	4:47
9.	"Into Heartbeats"	4:32
10.	"Sister"	9:01
11.	"Two Black Bones"	5:31
12.	"Only When You're Gone"	6:31
Total length:		64:55

Limited edition (disc 2) - The Nightly Disease Vol. II
No.	Title	Length
1.	"Nightly Disease, Part I"	6:41
2.	"Big Sleep"	3:49
3.	"I'm Sorry"	4:39

All lyrics are written by Sivert Høyem, except where noted; all music is composed by Madrugada, except where noted.

Deluxe edition 2011 (Disc 2)
No.	Title	Lyrics	Music	Length
1.	"City Blues"			3:33
2.	"Lost Gospel"			3:54
3.	"California (Athletic Sound Demo)"			2:44
4.	"Ice-9"			2:57
5.	"Ready to Carry You"			3:03
6.	"View from a Hilltop (Copenhagen Demo)"			3:01
7.	"Fast Blues for Little V."			3:26
8.	"4-Track Country Songs Part I"			3:06
9.	"4-Track Country Songs Part II"	Frode Jacobsen		5:10
10.	"I'm Sorry"	Robert Burås		4:41
11.	"Thrasher"	Neil Young	Young	8:52
12.	"Come on Home to Me" (Featuring Neil McNasty)	Lee Hazlewood	Hazlewood	5:23
13.	"Local Norma Jean (Stockholm Demo)"			3:30
14.	"Stop the Beats (Stockholm Demo)"			3:37
15.	"Nightclub (Hands Up - I Love You) (Stockholm Demo)"			5:53
16.	"If I Only Had My Guitar"			4:18
17.	"Lord, Why Have You Left Me?"			5:03
18.	"Departure #6"			4:00
19.	"Lift Me (Demo)"	Jacobsen		3:12

== Personnel ==
Madrugada

- Robert S. Burås – guitars, production, artwork, photography
- Sivert Høyem – vocals, production, artwork, illustrations, photography
- Frode Jacobsen – bass guitar, production, artwork, photography
- Jon Lauvland Pettersen – drums, production, artwork, illustrations, photography

== Certifications ==
Region	Certification	Certified units/sales
Norway (IFPI Norway)	Gold	25,000^{*}
^{*} Sales figures based on certification alone.
