= Lukas Kasha =

Norwegian rock band

- Origin: Oslo, Norway
- Genres: Alternative rock, dance-punk, electropop, indie rock, new romantics, new wave, Synthpop
- Years active: 2000—present
- Labels: Division Records
- Members: Andreas Prestmo; Kristian Singstad Pålshaugen; Eyvind Brox; Eivind Henjum; Jon Karlsen; Sven Andréen
- Past members: Christian Enger; Fredrik Lid; Roger Williamsen; Thomas Kaldhol; Kim Soppaland
- Website: lukaskasha.com

Lukas Kasha is a Norwegian rock band, based in Oslo. They released their debut album, Animated People's Republic, on January 29, 2007. The first single off the album was Love Abuse', which was played on heavy rotation on Norwegian radio from the fall of 2006 to early 2007, and was later included in the soundtrack for the video game by EA Sports, FIFA 08. Over the last few years, Lukas Kasha has played at the Popkomm festival in Berlin, the Eurosonic Festival in Groningen, the Reeperbahn festival in Hamburg, Liverpool Music Week and the IUSY festival in Alicante, besides touring Norway, including Øyafestivalen in Oslo and by:Larm. They have supported or shared stage with, amongst others, Juliette & the Licks, Shout Out Louds, Infadels, The Dears, The Raveonettes, Dungen, Johnossi, Telex and Brakes.

Lukas Kasha was formed in 2000, but after several changes in their line-up, only two founding members are still in the band: Andreas Prestmo (lead vocals/guitar) and Sven Andréen (drums/backing vocals). Kristian Singstad Pålshaugen (guitar), Eyvind Brox (keyboards) and Jon Karlsen (bass) joined the band collectively in 2004, while Eivind Henjum (keyboards) joined on a permanent basis in 2005, after first appearing as a stand-in when bass player Jon had an operation on his shoulder earlier the same year; Henjum originally being a bass player.

As of January 2009 Lukas Kasha are in the process of making their yet untitled second album, expected to be released in the spring. The recordings took place in a studio belonging to Norwegian band The Margarets, on the island Giske on the west coast of Norway, during October–November 2008. The album will be mixed by Pelle Gunnerfeldt of Swedish band Fireside, also known as a producer for bands like The Hives, Moneybrother and Sahara Hotnights.

On December 30, 2008, live video footage of two new songs was made available on YouTube, from a concert in Gjøvik. The two songs are called "Girl Named Ricky" and "Feel It", and are assumedly part of the material the band has recorded for their new album.

== Name ==
The band took their name from the main character in the adventure novel The First Two Lives of Lukas-Kasha (1978) by American author Lloyd Alexander.

== Band members ==
=== Current members ===
- Andreas Prestmo (2000–) - vocals, guitar
- Kristian Singstad Pålshaugen (2004–) - lead guitar
- Eyvind Brox (2004–) - keyboards, synths, percussion, backing vocals
- Eivind Henjum (2005–) - keyboards, synths, effects, backing vocals
- Jon Karlsen (2004–) - bass
- Sven Andréen (2000–) - drums, loops, effects, backing vocals

=== Former members ===
- Christian Enger (2000–2004) - guitar
- Fredrik Lid (2000–2001) - bass
- Roger Williamsen (2001–2004) - bass
- Thomas Kaldhol (2002–2004) - guitar
- Kim Soppaland (2002–2004) - keyboards

== Trivia ==
Keyboard players Eyvind Brox and Eivind Henjum are second cousins. Henjum actually added the family name Brox to his name in 2006.

== Discography ==
- You Are My Drug (2003, EP, self-released)
- Love Abuse (2006, radio single)
- Animated People's Republic (2007, CD, Division Records)
- Neon Meltdown (2007, radio single)

== Notes ==
=== Further reading ===
- https://web.archive.org/web/20150721193826/http://www.rockblogg.no/2010/02/lukas-kasha-tok-et-verdig-farvel/
- https://www.puls.no/14536.html
- https://www.oa.no/nye-filmer/lukas-kasha-animated-people-s-republic/r/1-81-2544036
- https://www.musikknyheter.no/record/1871
- https://www.vg.no/rampelys/i/e2Xlg/lukas-kasha-animated-people-s-republic
