= Thea Hjelmeland =

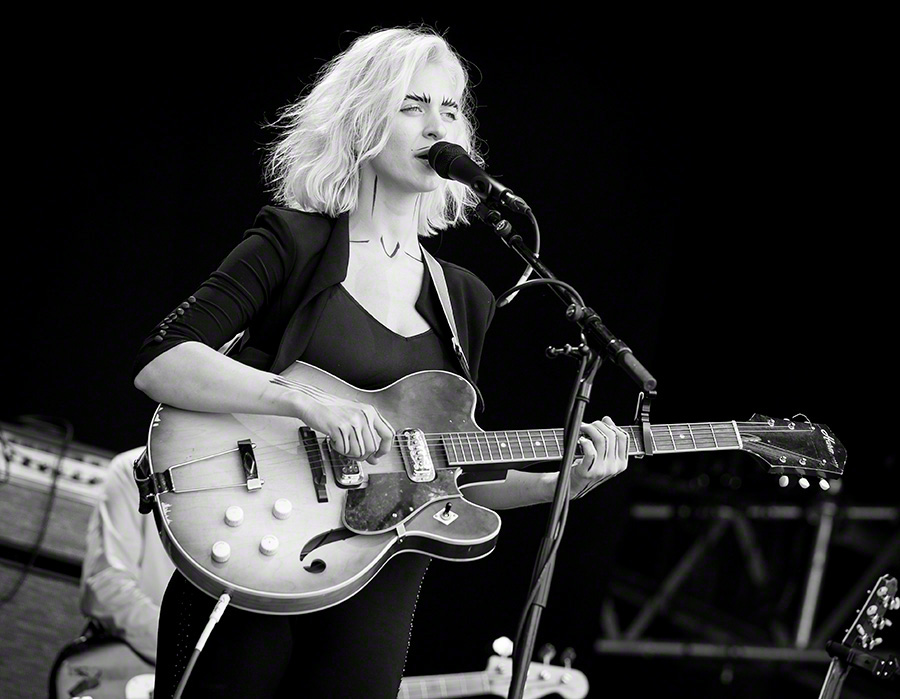
- Thea Hjelmeland at Piknik i Parken in 2016

Background information
- Born: 1987 (age 37–38); Førde, Sunnfjord, Sogn og Fjordane
- Origin: Norway
- Genres: Indie pop, folk music
- Occupations: Singer, songwriter
- Instruments: Vocals, guitar
- Labels: Øra Fonogram; TheaH Music

Thea Hjelmeland (born 1987) is a Norwegian musician, singer and songwriter. She was born in Førde Municipality in Sogn og Fjordane county, to an artist mother and a musician father.

== Career ==
Her first album Oh, the third.. was released in 2012.

Her second album Solar Plexus was released in 2014. The music is a mixture of pop, electronica and world music. The album received good to excellent reviews. The song "Feathery" was released as a single.

Hjelmeland has featured on several of Lars Vaular's songs. In 2014, she made the music for Frode Grytten's play Sånne som oss at Den Nationale Scene. The play was based on the songs of John Olav Nilsen & Gjengen.

She lives in Bergen and has also lived in Førde, Cuba and Paris.

== Honors ==
- 2014: Spellemannprisen awarded in the class Indie pop
- 2015: Vossajazzprisen

== Discography ==
- 2012: Oh, The Third.. (Øra Fonogram)
- 2014: Solar Plexus (TheaH Music)

Awards
Preceded by Young Dreams	Recipient of the Indie Spellemannprisen; 2014	Succeeded by -
Preceded by Sigbjørn Apeland	Recipient of the Vossajazzprisen; 2015	Succeeded by -
