= Lukestar =

Norwegian indie rock band

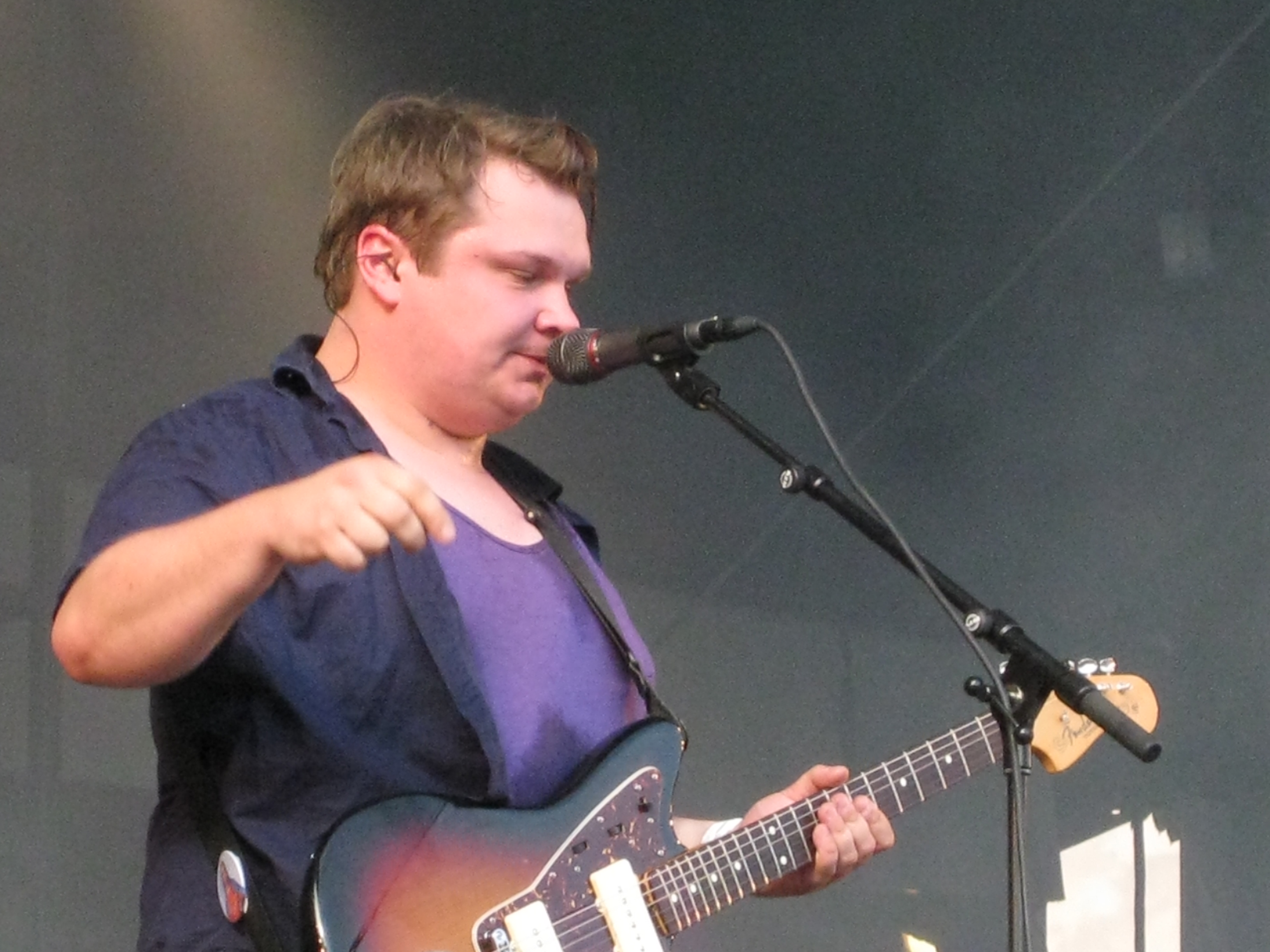
- Front man Truls Heggero

Background information
- Origin: Oslo, Norway
- Genres: Indie rock, Post-hardcore, Powerpop
- Years active: 1995 – 2012
- Labels: Tuba, Underhill, ChewinPine, Phone Me
- Members: Truls Heggero; Yngve Hilmo; Jørgen Larsen; Marius Ergo
- Past members: Even Djønne; Ola Schmidt; Eirik L. Bærulfsen; Torbjørn Hafnor
- Website: www.lukestar.com

Lukestar was an indie rock band based in Oslo, Norway. As of June 2008, the band was signed to the label 'Tuba Records', among others. They are known for their musical fusion of hardcore punk and indie rock.

== Biography ==
The band was formed in 1995 under the name Luke Warm, but the name was later changed to Lukestar. In 2002, they released their first EP entitled Code: Distance, and two years later, in 2004, they released their debut full-length album Alpine Unit. In January 2008, the band's second album Lake Toba was released. Also in 2008, band members Even Djønne, and Eirik L. Bærulfsen, were replaced by Jørgen Larsen, and Torbjørn Hafnor, from hardcore punk band "The Spectacle".

Lukestar received the 2008 Spellemann Award (The Norwegian Grammy Award 2008, Spellemannprisen), in the category Best Rock Band for the album Lake Toba. In February 2011, Lukestar released their third album Taiga. The first single from this album "Flying Canoes," was A-listed on NRK P3. The band broke up in 2012, and played farewell concert at Parkteatret in Oslo on 31 August.

Vocalist Truls Heggero had great success as solo artist and released the album TRVLS (pronounced travels) in 2013, which had two giant hits: "Out Of Yourself," and "The Next".

== Honors ==
- 2008: Spellemannprisen in the category Rock music, for the album Lake Toba

== Discography ==
- 2002: Code: Distance [EP] (Machine Machine / Phone MeHandmade / Rec 90)
- 2004: Alpine Unit (ChewinPine)
- 2007: White Shade 7" (Phone Me)
- 2008: Lake Toba (Phone Me / Tuba Records/Flameshovel)
- 2011: Taiga
- 2011: Great Bear [EP]

Awards
Preceded by My Midnight Creeps	Recipient of the Rock Spellemannprisen; 2008	Succeeded by John Olav Nilsen & Gjengen
