= A Glimmer of Hope =

Studio album by El Cuero
- Released: 8 October 2008
- Recorded: February 2008
- Studio: Parachute Studio, Oslo
- Genre: Roots rock
- Length: 47:18
- Label: Gravel Road Music
- Producer: El Cuero & Lars Håvard Haugen

El Cuero chronology
| El Cuero (2007) | A Glimmer of Hope (2008) | From Mountains to Sand (2011) |

A Glimmer of Hope is the second studio album by Norwegian roots rock group El Cuero, released in October 2008.

== Recording and release ==
Following a ten-month tour in support of their first album, El Cuero returned to the studio in Winter 2008. Recording of the album took place in February at Parachute Studious in Oslo, Norway, and the album was mixed in the following months, by veteran record producer and musician Lars Håvard Haugen, best known for his involvement with Hellbillies.

Mixing finished in the summer of 2008, and the album was released on 8 October 2008 to rave reviews and near universal acclaim from the Norwegian music press.

== Track listing ==
All music and lyrics by Brynjar Takle Ohr.

1. The Road Goes On - 6:14
2. A Glimmer of Hope - 3:52
3. Dreary Sundays - 4:54
4. When The Lights Go Out - 6:08
5. To Build A Home - 4:49
6. This Town - 3:33
7. Are You Listening? - 3:55
8. These Times - 3:41
9. Lights Up the River - 10:22

== Personnel ==
=== El Cuero ===
- Brynjar Takle Ohr - lead vocals, guitars, piano on "When The Lights Go Out"
- Tommy Reite - bass guitar
- Håvard Takle Ohr - drums, backing vocals
- Øyvind Blomstrøm - lead guitars, pedal steel, piano and backing vocals

=== Additional musicians ===
- Ingrid Olava - vocals on "To Build A Home"
- Lars Christian Narum - hammond organ
- Andre Orvik, Vegard Johnsen, Dorthe Dreier, Anne Britt Sævig Årdal - strings

Mxed by Mike Hartung, engineered by Roar Nilsen.
