= Øyafestivalen =

Annual music festival in Oslo, Norway

- Status: Active
- Genre: Music Festival
- Date: Mid August
- Begins: August 06
- Ends: August 10
- Frequency: Annually
- Location: Oslo
- Country: Norway
- Years active: 1999 – present
- Website: oyafestivalen.com

Øyafestivalen is an annual Norwegian music festival held in the Tøyen Park, Oslo. It has grown quickly since its modest start in 1999 and has become one of Norway's biggest and most important music festivals.

The festival has previously featured musicians like Kanye West, Sonic Youth, Iggy and The Stooges, Arctic Monkeys, Babyshambles, Morrissey, and Beck.

The festival lasts for four days in the main park area, and is preceded by a club night where the festival holds concerts in more or less all of Oslo's central clubs.

== History ==
For the first two years, the festival was held in Kalvøya, near Sandvika just outside Oslo. Contrary to popular belief, it is not the same festival as the old Kalvøyafestivalen, which was also held at Kalvøya.

After its first two years at Kalvøya, the festival was in 2001 moved to Middelalderparken in downtown Oslo, making it more of a central festival. More than 80 bands played in the park in 2009.

Then, in 2014, as construction works made it impossible to hold the festival in Middelalderparken, it was moved to the Tøyen Park. The festival was not arranged for the years 2020 and 2021 due to restrictions and the global pandemic.

== History/bookings ==
Year	Visitors	Artists and bands
1999	1.200	Big Bang (NO), Bronco Busters (NO), Cato Salsa Experience (NO), Gluecifer (NO), Jaga Jazzist (NO), Madrugada (NO), Midnight Choir (NO), P.I.K.E (NO), Palace of Pleasure (NO), Ricochets (NO), We (NO)
2000	4.000	The Soundtrack Of Our Lives (SE), Kings Of Convenience (NO), Number Seven Deli (NO), Emily Lang (NO), Gluecifer, Cloroform (NO), Briskeby (NO), Asian Dub Foundation (UK), Amulet (NO), Planet Derrick
2001	7.500	Blonde Redhead (US), Danko Jones (CA), The Hives (SE), Cato Salsa Experience, Warlocks (NO), Backyard Babies (SE), Silver (NO), Team Spirit (NO), Faze Action Live (NO), Frank Znort Quartet (NO), Thulsa Doom (NO)
2002	16.000	Motorpsycho (NO), The New Pornographers (CA), Nancy Sinatra (US), Will Oldham aka Bonnie Prince Billy (US), St. Etienne (UK) Kaizers Orchestra (NO), Supervixen (NO), Ralph Myers and the Jack Herren Band (NO), Spiritualized (UK), Gatas Parlament (NO)
2003	24.000	Calexico (US), Mogwai (UK), Yeah Yeah Yeahs (US), The International Tussler Society, Cinnamoon, Mando Diao (SE), Röyksopp (NO), Sister Rain (NO), Thomas Dybdahl (NO), Turbonegro (NO), The Mormones (No), Union Carbide Productions (SE)
2004	38.000	Air (FR), The Streets (UK), Your Enemies Friends (US), Lemonheads (US), Velvet Revolver (US), Mark Lanegan Band (US), Underbyen (DK), The Unicorns (CAN), Kim Hiortøy, The National Bank, Pleasure, Amulet, Animal Alpha
2005	45.000	Wolf Parade (CA) Sonic Youth (US), Dinosaur Jr (US), Madrugada, Franz Ferdinand (UK), Fischerspooner (US), Hot Hot Heat (CAN), Death From Above 1979 (CAN) Babyshambles (UK), DeLillos, Datarock, Paperboys, Shining, El Caco
2006	50.000	Brut boogaloo (NO) Yoko Ono (US), Beck (US), Morrissey (UK) Kieran Hebden aka Four Tet m/ Steve Reid (UK/US), Hot Chip (UK), Les Savy Fav (US), Black Mountain (CA), dEUS (BE), Heroes and Zeros, 120 Days, The Whitest Boy Alive, Motorpsycho, The Fall (UK), The Cramps (US), Enslaved
2007	73.000	...And You Will Know Us By The Trail Of Dead (US), The Jesus and Mary Chain (UK), Devendra Banhart (US), Primal Scream (UK), Tool (US), Familjen (SE), Justice (FR), Rockettothesky, Thomas Dybdahl m/KORK, Bare Egil Band, Roky Erickson (US), Anja Garbarek, Woven Hand (US), Tinariwen (ML), Susanne Sundfør, Melvins (US), Ida Maria, Boredoms (JP)
2008	77.500	Sigur Rós (IS), José Gonzáles (SE), Mogwai (UK), Iron & Wine (US), N*E*R*D (US), Fleet Foxes (US), Booka Shade (DE), Sonic Youth (US), The National (US), Cut Copy (AU), Yeasayer (US), Lykke Li (SE), Okkerville River (US), My Bloody Valentine (IE), Casiokids, Turbonegro, Tommy Tokyo & Starving For My Gravy, Janelle Monáe (US)
2009	85.000	Arctic Monkeys (UK), Rise Against (US), Lily Allen (UK), Wilco (US), Doves (UK), Vampire Weekend (US), Röyksopp, Band of Horses (US), Crystal Castles (CA), Florence and The Machine (UK), Grizzly Bear (US), Mew (DK), Beach House (US), Jay Reatard (US), bob hund (SE) Bon Iver (US), Thåström (SE), Datarock, Ulver, Beirut (US), Madness (UK), Fever Ray (SE), Junior Boys (CA), Jaga Jazzist, Ladyhawke (NZ), Glasvegas (UK), Kråkesølv, The Bronx (US), Satyricon, John Olav Nilsen & Gjengen
2010	85.000	Air (FR), The Flaming Lips (US), LCD Soundsystem (US), Motorpsycho, M.I.A (UK), Pavement (US), The National (US), La Roux (UK), Iggy & The Stooges (US), Robyn (SE), Four Tet (UK), The XX (UK), The Specials (UK), Caribou (CA), Yeasayer (US), Converge (US), Miike Snow, Broken Bells (US), The Whip (UK), The Gaslight Anthem (US), Against Me! (US), Paul Weller (UK), Panda Bear (US), Big Boi (US), Surfer Blood (US), Jónsi (IS), Kitchie Kitchie Ki Me O, Moddi, Shining, Serena Maneesh, Karpe Diem
2011	N/A	Kanye West (US), Fleet Foxes (US), Aphex Twin (UK), Pulp (UK), Lykke Li (SE), Håkan Hellström (SE), Kaizers Orchestra (NO), Wiz Khalifa (US), Eye Emma Jedi (NO)
2012	N/A	Florence and the Machine (UK), Björk (IS), The Stone Roses (UK), Refused (SE), Bon Iver (US), Ane Brun, Feist (CA), ASAP Rocky (US)
2013	N/A	Blur (UK), Kendrick Lamar (US), Kraftwerk (DE), The Knife (SE), Tame Impala (AU), Godspeed You! Black Emperor (CA), Rodriguez (US), Cat Power (US), Solange (US), Local Natives (US), James Blake (UK), Beach House (US), Disclosure (UK), Slayer (US)
2014	N/A	Todd Terje (NO), OutKast (US), Queens of the Stone Age (US), Röyksopp & Robyn (NO/SE), The National (US), Janelle Monáe (US), Slowdive (UK), Thomas Dybdahl, Stein Torleif Bjella, Neutral Milk Hotel (US), Deafheaven (US), Darkside (US), Blood Orange (UK), Omar Souleyman (SY), Joey Badass (US), Bombino (NG), The Julie Ruin (US), Jonathan Wilson (US), King Midas, Highasakite
2015	N/A	Wednesday: Chic feat. Nile Rodgers (US), In Flames (SE), The War on Drugs (US), Belle & Sebastian (UK), Sondre Lerche (NO); Thursday: Florence and the Machine (UK), Flying Lotus (US), Ride (UK), Father John Misty (US), Bad Religion (US); Friday: Beck (US), Alt-J (UK), Lars Vaular (NO), Ida Jenshus (NO), Jaga Jazzist (NO); Saturday: Susanne Sundfør (NO), Thåström (SE), Emilie Nicolas (NO), deLillos (NO)
2016	N/A	Massive Attack (UK), The Last Shadow Puppets (UK), PJ Harvey (UK), Jamie xx (UK), Eagles of Death Metal (US), Highasakite (NO), New Order (UK), Haim (US), Foals (UK)
2017	18.500	Lana Del Rey (US), Hurray for the Riff Raff (US), Colter Wall (US), Migos (US)
2018	N/A	Arctic Monkeys (UK), The Comet is Coming (UK), Brockhampton (US), Grizzly Bear (US), Goldie (UK), Arcade Fire (CAN), Jenny Lewis (US), The Lemon Twigs (US), Phoebe Bridgers (US), King Gizzard & the Lizard Wizard (AUS), Wolf Alice (UK), Moses Sumney (US), Sleaford Mods (UK), Yaeji (US), 6lack (US), Fever Ray (SE), High on Fire (US), Kendrick Lamar (US), Behemoth (POL), Lykke Li (SE), Tangerine Dream (GER), St. Vincent (US), Charlotte Gainsbourg (F), Cezinando (NOR), Patti Smith (US)
2019	N/A	Karpe, The Cure, Robyn, Motorpsycho, Silvana Imam, Tame Impala, Christine & the Queens, Erykah Badu, Sigrid, Ricochets, James Blake, Blood Orange, Earl Sweatshirt, Rex Orange County, Hot Snakes, Jonathan Wilson, IDLES, Razika, Cult of Luna, Big Thief, Girl in Red, Protoje, Turnstile, Pom Poko, slowthai, Sushi x Kobe, Hellbillies, Pen Gutt, Golden Core
2022	20.000	Aurora, Gorillaz, Nick Cave and the Bad Seeds, Florence + The Machine, Emilie Nicolas, Michael Kiwanuka, girl in red, Kvelertak, Dagny, Arif, H.E.R., First Aid Kit, Sondre Lerche
2023		Sigrid, Håkan Hellström, Veps, boygenius, Snail Mail, Caroline Polachek, Shygirl, Lorde
2024		Gabrielle, Pulp, The National, PJ Harvey, Janelle Monaé, Arca, Raye, Jorja Smith
2025		Girl In Red, Charli xcx, Chappell Roan, Queens of The Stone Age, Yung Lean & Bladee, Lola Young, Beth Gibbons, Fontaines D.C, Honningbarna, Geordie Greep, Mk.gee

-
