= My Midnight Creeps =

Norwegian rock band (2003-2007)

- Origin: Norway
- Genres: Rock; Progressive rock Alternative rock
- Years active: 2003 — 2007
- Past members: Robert Burås† (guitar/vocals); Behzad Farazollahi (drums); Simen Vangen (drums); Anders Møller (percussion); Alex Kloster-Jensen (guitar); Raymond Jensen (bass); Mikael Lindqvist (piano & keyboards)

My Midnight Creeps (initiated 2003 in Oslo, Norway) was a Norwegian rock band fronted by Madrugada-guitarist Robert Burås and Ricochets-guitarist Alex Kloster-Jensen.

== Biography ==
Other members included Dag Stiberg on tenor saxophone, Behzad Farazollahi on drums, Anders Møller on percussion and Raymond Jensen on bass. Keyboardist Mikael Lindqvist also appeared on their first album, My Midnight Creeps. The band's music carried inspiration from The Stooges, as well as The Rolling Stones and The Animals. Their critically acclaimed second album Histamin received six out of six points in a review in Norwegian newspaper Verdens Gang.

Following the death of Burås on July 12, 2007, My Midnight Creeps was quickly dissolved, however, in 2011 the remaining members of the band (with the exception of bassist Jensen, who was replaced by ex-Madrugada bassist Frode Jacobsen) started a new project named Kitchie Kitchie Ki Me O. They released their self-titled debut in June 2011 with a follow-up entitled Are You Land Or Water? released in January 2016. The band is named after a My Midnight Creeps song from the album Histamin, and is musically very different from its predecessor, making heavy use of intricate rhythms and female backing vocals with their second album heading in a more dark and ambient musical direction.

== Honors ==
- 2007: Spellemannprisen in the category Rock music, for the album Histamin

== Discography ==
- 2005: My Midnight Creeps (MMC Records)
- 2007: Histamin (EMI Music)

Awards
Preceded by 120 Days	Recipient of the Rock Spellemannprisen; 2007	Succeeded by Lukestar
