= Sivert Høyem =

Norwegian musician (born 1976)

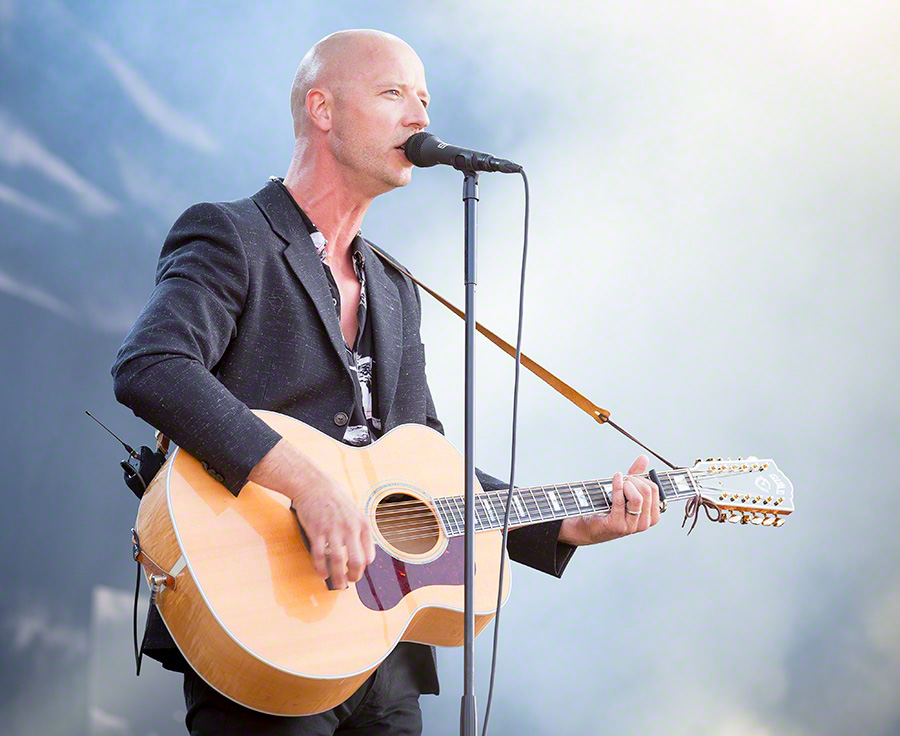
- Høyem in 2016

Background information
- Born: January 22, 1976 (age 50); Sortland, Norway
- Genres: Rock, alternative rock
- Instruments: Vocals; guitar; bass
- Years active: 1992–present
- Labels: EMI, Virgin
- Website: siverthoyem.com

Sivert Høyem (born 22 January 1976) is a Norwegian musician, best known as the vocalist of the rock band Madrugada. After the band broke up following the death of Robert Burås in 2007, he has enjoyed success as a solo artist and is also a member of The Volunteers with whom he released the album Exiles in 2006.

== Early and personal life ==
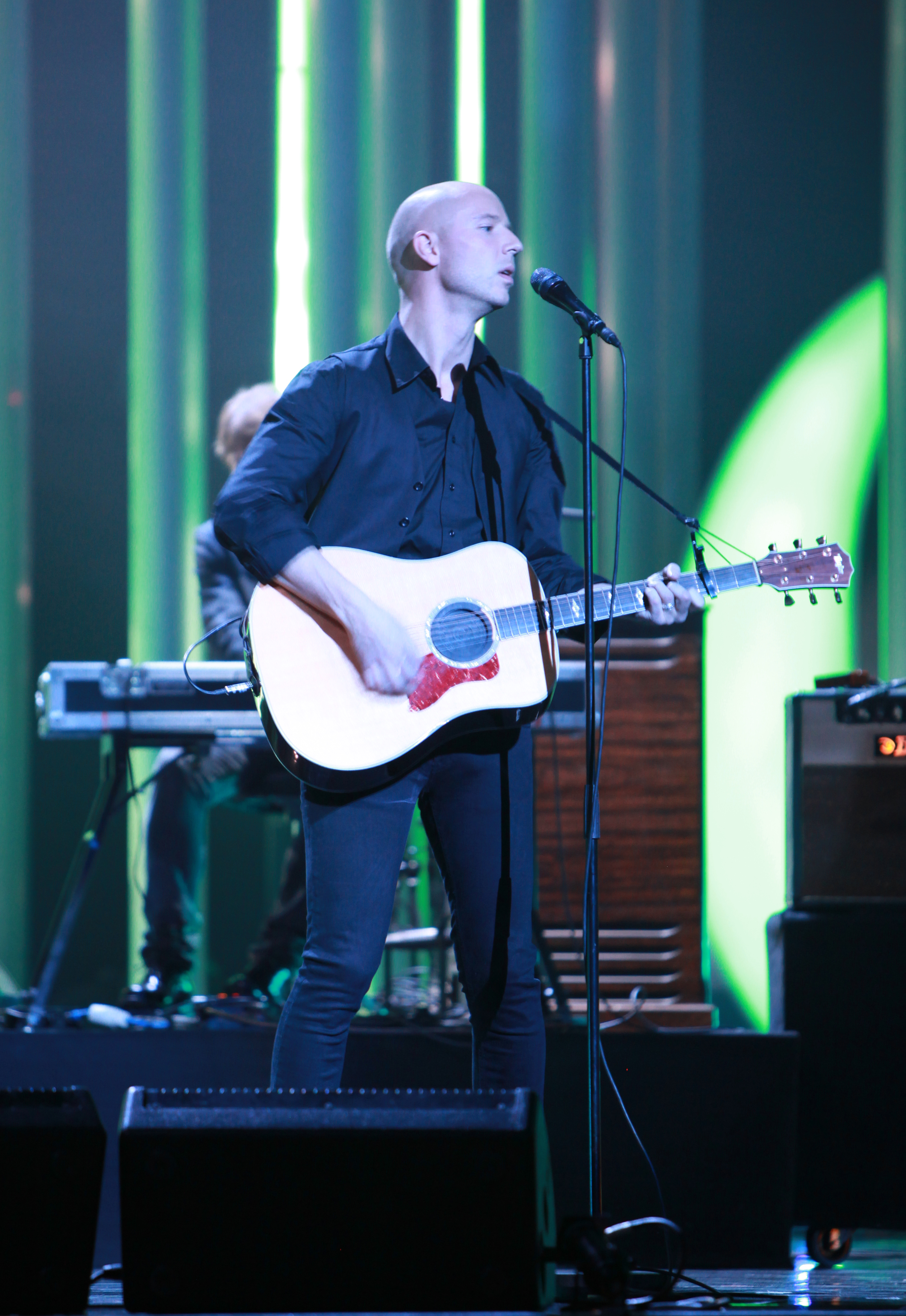
Høyem at the Nobel Peace Prize Concert in Oslo 2010.

Høyem is a son of forestry teacher Asbjørn Høyem and politician Jørun Drevland. He hails from Kleiva in Sortland Municipality, and attended Sortland Upper Secondary School before moving to Oslo in 1995. Whilst pursuing a music career he minored in history at the University of Oslo.

== Music career ==
=== Madrugada ===
Høyem rose to fame in the late 1990s when Madrugada made their Norwegian breakthrough with debut album Industrial Silence. The band members included Sivert Høyem (vocals), Frode Jacobsen (bass), and Robert Burås (guitar). After the death of Burås on 12 July 2007, Høyem and Jacobsen decided to finish recording their latest album. The album, entitled Madrugada, was released on 21 January 2008. After the release of the album the band announced they would split after one last tour. They performed their last ever concert on 15 November 2008 at Oslo Spektrum.

=== Solo ===
He has the last few years had success as a solo artist, releasing the albums Ladies and Gentlemen of the Opposition (2004), Moon Landing (2009) and Long Slow Distance (2011), Endless Love (2014) and Lioness (2016).

He formed his band the Volunteers made up of:

- Sivert Høyem: Vocals/Guitar/Songwriter
- Cato Salsa: Guitars/Keyboards
- Børge Fjordheim: Drums/Shaker/Tambourine
- Rudi Nikolaisen: Bass (Live)
- Kalle Gustafson Jerneholm: Bass (On Record)
- Christer Knutsen: Guitars/Keyboards

He released the album Exiles in 2006, credited to Sivert Høyem & the Volunteers. He toured with his band in May 2007 playing at festivals across Norway. In December 2009 he concluded another tour with his new band. In April 2012 in a radio interview at the "Rock Show" radio program in Greece, he clearly stated that there won't be any other album with the Volunteers.

In September 2010 Sivert Høyem launched the song "Prisoner of the road" in order to raise awareness for NRC, which is this year's recipient of the Norwegian National Telethon.

In 2015, "Black & Gold" was chosen to be the opening song of the Norwegian TV series Okkupert ("Occupied").

== Discography ==
=== Albums ===
With the band Madrugada

- 1999: Industrial Silence
- 2001: The Nightly Disease
  - CD: The Nightly Disease Vol. II
- 2002: Grit
- 2005: The Deep End
- 2005: Live at Tralfamadore
- 2008: Madrugada
- 2022: Chimes at Midnight

Solo

Year	Album	Peak positions		Certification
Year	Album	NOR	GRE	Certification
2004	Ladies and Gentlemen of the Opposition	3	—	
2009	Moon Landing	1	3	
2011	Long Slow Distance	1	—	NOR: 2× Platinum (60,000+)
2014	Endless Love	1	—	
2016	Lioness	1	—	
2017	Live at Acropolis – Herod Atticus Odeon, Athens	9	—	
2024	On an Island	2	—	
2025	Dancing Headlights	7	20	
2026	The Rest Of	13	—	

As Sivert Høyem & the Volunteers

Year	Album	Peak positions
Year	Album	NOR
2006	Exiles	1

As guest vocalist

- 2013: Vocals on the song "Phoenix" on Satyricon's 2013 self-titled studio album.
- 2020: Vocals on the song "Coming Home" on Me and that Man's "New Man, New Songs, Same Shit, Vol. 1" album

=== Singles ===
Year	Single	Credited as	Peak positions	Certification	Album
Year	Single	Credited as	NOR	Certification	Album
2009	"Moon Landing"	Sivert Høyem	2		Moon Landing
2010	"Prisoner of the Road"	Sivert Høyem	1		
2016	"Sleepwalking Man"	Sivert Høyem			Lioness

As Sivert Høyem & the Volunteers

Year	Single	Peak positions	Certification	Album
Year	Single	NOR	Certification	Album
2006	"Into the Sea"	4		
2007	"Don't Pass Me By"	16		
