= El Cuero =

Norwegian rock band

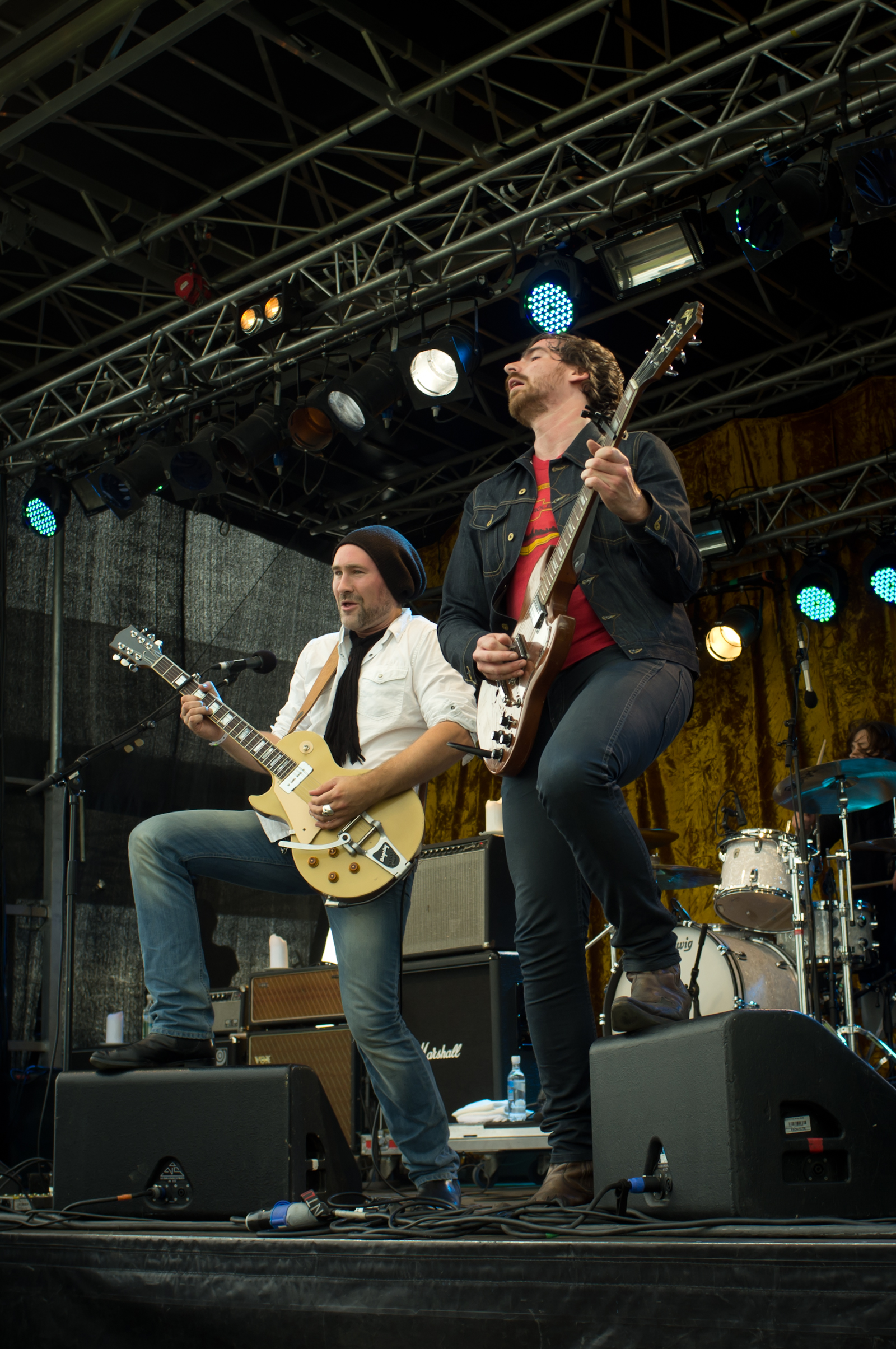
- Brynjar Takle Ohr (left) and Øyvind Blomstrøm on stage at Slottsfjell 2012

Background information
- Origin: Kristiansund, Norway
- Genres: Rock, country rock, roots rock
- Years active: 2005 - present
- Labels: EMI; Gravel Road Music
- Members: Håvard Takle Ohr; Brynjar Takle Ohr; Tommy Reite
- Past members: Øyvind Blomstrøm; Vegard Strand Holthe
- Website: el-cuero.com

El Cuero is a Norwegian rock group formed in Kristiansund by brothers Håvard and Brynjar Takle Ohr in 2005. They have released seven studio albums, one live album and an EP, with their eighth studio album scheduled for release in 2027.

== History ==
The band was formed by brothers Håvard (drums) and Brynjar Takle Ohr (guitars, vocals) during Christmas 2005, before they were joined by friends and fellow musicians Øyvind Blomstrøm (guitars) and Tommy Reite (bass) to complete the line-up a few weeks later. The two brothers had previously played in several groups together, but had a falling out that left them estranged for several years, by their own admission as they "grew tired of each other" after constantly working and living together for nearly two decades. On one occasion prior, the brothers angrily chased each other around in a crowded restaurant, one of them holding a steak knife, an incident they later referred to as "typical sibling rivalry". After spending two years writing material which was tested on stage, the band entered Caliban Studios in Oslo to record their eponymous debut album in early 2007. Released to positive reviews by the Norwegian media, the album sold fairly well but failed to give the band mainstream attention. Nevertheless, the group commenced touring in support of the record, while continuing to create new music.

Less than a year later, the band returned to the studio to record their follow-up album. Released in 2008, A Glimmer of Hope was met with universal praise from both media and fans, making the band a mainstream feature for the first time. The band soon embarked on an extensive tour to support the album. They also attracted attention from other artists, among them Jackson Browne, who singled them out for praise while on tour in Norway. The tour was continously extended, eventually spanning nearly two years, taking advantage of the publicity that followed their successful album.

After their prolonged tour and a subsequent break, they returned to the studio in late 2010 to begin work on their third studio album. On March 8, 2011, the band announced that the album would be titled From Mountains to Sand, with the lead single from the album, "Footprints", released ten days later alongside the music video. Released on May 27, 2011, the album entered both the Norwegian iTunes album chart and national album charts at number one.

In September 2012, the band revealed that twelve songs had been prepared for an upcoming fourth album, written and recorded in complete secrecy in what the members described as "a three-week jam session". To avoid distractions and interruptions, the band had rented an old, abandoned school building, where they stayed during the entire three-week period with only a handful of people knowing and having access. On November 28, the album's first single, "My Dark America" was released as the lead single along with confirmation that the album be titled Victor's Justiceand released on February 8, 2013. The album was eventually released on March 8, 2013, due to delays with the artwork, once again to overwhelmingly positive reviews. During the subsequent four-month tour, the band recorded and produced their first live album, El Cuero's Justice - Live!, which was released on October 11, 2013.

In January 2014, it was announced that El Cuero had been selected by NRK as one of the entries for the third semi-final of the 2014 Melodi Grand Prix, the Norwegian qualifier for the Eurovision Song Contest. Their entry, "Ain't No Love (In This City No More)", eventually reached the final, where it was beaten by advance favorite "Silent Storm". It is to date the only song recorded by the band exclusively as a single, without appearing on an album or EP. Following their participation, the band spent the rest of the year working on separate projects and ventures, including a prolonged period as touring musicians for Egil Hegerberg and his Bare Egil Band.

On September 2, 2015, after a prolonged break from touring, the band released "Too Late To Go Back", their first new track in eighteen months and the lead single for their upcoming fifth album, Souls Under Red Light, that was released on October 20. Following the release, the band embarked on a supporting tour of the album, with guitarist Øyvind Blomstrøm taking a leave of absence, being temporarily replaced by Vegard Strand Holthe. After the tour ended in February 2016, it was announced the Blomstrøm had departed the band to pursue new projects, with Holthe becoming his full-time replacement. The three-track EP The Truth, the Passion, and the Blues, released in August 2016, featured Blomstrøms final recordings with the group. In 2017, the band released their sixth album, For All Remaining Days, their first with Holthe as a full-time member and also the first album to not be supported by a tour. Ten months later the band announced the long-awaited re-release of their debut album, featuring remastered sound and unreleased bonus tracks. The release, commemorating the ten year anniversary of the album, was accompanied by a twelve-date tour ending with an anniversary concert in their home town of Kristiansund on December 29, after which the group took an extended break. Following the end of their anniversary activities the group went on an extended break, during which the members dedicated their time to other projects; Håvard Takle Ohr as the drummer for metal band Kvelertak, Brynjar Takle Ohr as the guitarist and singer for the prog rock group Spidergawd, while Reite played bass for the garage rock band The Dogs.

On 23 November 2023, almost six years after their previous performance, the group unexpectedly released the new single "Dream It Up Again", with their seventh album ...are we done yet? being announced soon after for a March 2024 release. The album had been recorded in secret, beginning in 2021, and featured the last recordings with guitarist Vegard Strand Holthe, who left the group after the recording sessions finished in 2022. The album was followed by their first tour since 2017 and their first as a three-piece, with the group electing to not recruit a new fourth member.

Their eighth as-of-yet-untitled album is scheduled for a 2027 release, with the lead single "See The World Through Electric Eyes" released on 13 November 2026. The new album will be followed by a tour, The Waves and Canyons Tour, marking the 20th anniversary of their debut album.

== Band members ==
=== Current ===
- Brynjar Takle Ohr (2005–present) - lead vocals, guitars
- Håvard Takle Ohr (2005–present) - drums, percussion, backing vocals
- Tommy Reite (2005–present) - bass, backing vocals

=== Former ===
- Øyvind Blomstrøm (2005–16) - guitars, backing vocals
- Vegard Strand Holthe (2015–22) - guitars, backing vocals (touring 2015-16, full-time 2016-22)

== Discography ==
As of 2026, the band has released five studio albums, one live album and one EP. All albums are available in CD and LP formats, as well as digital.

=== Albums ===
Title and details	Chart positions
Title and details	NOR
El Cuero: Released: August 15, 2007 (CD), March 19, 2011 (digital), October 13, 2017 (deluxe edition, vinyl); Label: Gravel Road Music	–
A Glimmer of Hope: Released: October 8, 2008 (CD and vinyl), March 19, 2011 (digital); Label: Gravel Road Music	–
From Mountains to Sand: Released: May 27, 2011; Format: CD, vinyl LP and digital	3
Victor's Justice: Released: March 8, 2013; Format: CD, vinyl LP and digital	16
Souls Under Red Light: Released: October 20, 2015; Format: CD, vinyl LP and digital	16
For All Remaining Days: Released: January 27, 2017; Format: CD, vinyl LP and digital	–
...Are We Done Yet?: Released: March 8, 2024; Format: CD, vinyl LP and digital	–

=== Singles and EPs ===
- "Footprints" (single) - March 18, 2011
- "My Dark America" - November 28, 2012
- "Ain't No Love (In The City No More)" - January 2014
- "Too Late To Go Back" - September 2, 2015 (Tidal-only), September 4, 2015 (worldwide)
- "The Truth, The Passion & The Blues" (EP) - August 11, 2016

=== Live ===
- "El Cuero's Justice - Live!" - October 11, 2013
