= Jørun Drevland =

Norwegian politician

Jørun Adeleid Drevland (born 15 March 1944) is a Norwegian politician for the Socialist Left Party.

She served as a deputy representative to the Parliament of Norway from Nordland during the term 1993–1997. She met during 7 days of parliamentary session.

She hails from Sortland Municipality, and in 2012 she worked with artist Bjørn Elvenes on an initiative to paint the town of Sortland blue as an art project. She is the mother of musician Sivert Høyem.
