= The Deep End (Madrugada album) =

Studio album by Madrugada
- Released: 28 February 2005
- Studio: Sound City Studios, Van Nuys; Urban Studios, Oslo
- Genre: Rock
- Length: 53:54
- Label: EMI/Virgin Records
- Producer: George Drakoulias

Madrugada chronology
Grit (2002)	The Deep End (2005)	Live at Tralfamadore (2005)

Professional ratings
Review scores
Source	Rating
Allmusic	link

The Deep End is the fourth album by Norwegian rock band Madrugada, released on 28 February 2005. Produced by George Drakoulias and recorded at Sound City studios in Los Angeles, the album features some of the band's most accessible songs and would go on to sell 90,000 copies in Norway.

== Track listing ==
All lyrics are written by Sivert Høyem, except track 10 and 12 by Høyem and Robert Burås; all music is composed by Madrugada.

No.	Title	Length
1.	"The Kids Are on High Street"	4:57
2.	"On Your Side"	3:53
3.	"Hold on to You"	6:34
4.	"Stories from the Streets"	5:19
5.	"Running Out of Time"	6:08
6.	"The Lost Gospel"	3:53
7.	"Elektro Vakuum"	4:50
8.	"Subterranean Sunlight"	3:59
9.	"Hard to Come Back"	4:04
10.	"Ramona"	3:55
11.	"Slow Builder"	6:14
12.	"Sail Away"	6:09

Bonus tracks
No.	Title	Length
13.	"Life in the City"	2:58
14.	"I'm in Love"	4:27
