= Grit (Madrugada album) =

Studio album by Madrugada
- Released: 20 October 2002
- Recorded: Spring 2002 at Tritonus Tonstudio GmbH, Berlin; Germany
- Genre: Alternative rock
- Length: 47:46
- Label: Virgin
- Producer: Frode Jacobsen, Howard "Head" Bullivant

Madrugada chronology
The Nightly Disease (2001)	Grit (2002)	The Deep End (2005)

Professional ratings
Review scores
Source	Rating
Allmusic	3.5/5 stars

Grit is the third album by Norwegian alternative rock band Madrugada, released on 20 October 2002. The album saw the band once again taking a vastly different approach to their previous release featuring a much rawer and at times more experimental sound with Krautrock and garage rock influences taking precedence. The album also featured one of the band's most well-known songs in the softly atmospheric ballad "Majesty".

== Track listing ==
No.	Title	Length
1.	"Blood Shot Adult Commitment"	4:56
2.	"Ready"	2:51
3.	"I Don't Fit"	4:21
4.	"Madrugada"	5:15
5.	"Seven Seconds"	3:36
6.	"Proxy"	5:20
7.	"Come Back Billy Pilgrim"	3:56
8.	"Get Back In Line"	4:13
9.	"Majesty"	4:23
10.	"Try"	3:24
11.	"Got You - Love's Institution" (hidden track)	10:54
Total length:		47:46
