= Cato Salsa Experience =

Norwegian indie rock band

- Origin: Oslo, Norway
- Genres: Indie rock Garage Rock
- Years active: 2000–2007

Cato Salsa Experience was an indie rock band from Oslo, Norway. The group formed around jam sessions at lead singer Cato Thomassen's house. The group began playing locally and released a vinyl EP before Emperor Norton Records, an American label, signed them and released their 2002 full-length, A Good Tip for a Good Time. Later in the 2000s, the group began recording albums with The Thing.

Following the beginning of Cato Thomassen's full-time musical partnership with ex Madrugada singer Sivert Höyem in 2009, the band is seemingly now defunct.

== Members ==
- Cato (Salsa) Thomassen - vocals, guitar
- Christian Engfelt - bass
- Jon Magne Riise - drums
- Nina Bjorndalen - keyboards

== Discography ==
- Saso Calsa (Garralda Records, 2000)
- A Good Tip for a Good Time (Emperor Norton, 2002)
- Sounds Like a Sandwich, with The Thing and Joe McPhee (Smalltown Supersound, 2005)
- Fruit Is Still Fresh (Sony Japan, 2006)
- No. 3 (Rogue Australia, 2006)
- Two Bands and a Legend, with The Thing and Joe McPhee (Smalltown Supersound, 2007)
- Two Bands and a Legend: I See You Baby, (EP) with The Thing and Joe McPhee (Smalltown Supersound, 2007)
