= Live at Tralfamadore =

Live album by Madrugada
- Released: 14 December 2005
- Genre: Rock
- Length: 1:07:00 (Disc 1); 00:25:44 (Disc 2)
- Label: EMI/Virgin Records

Madrugada chronology
The Deep End (2005)	Live at Tralfamadore (2005)	Madrugada (2008)

Live at Tralfamadore is the fifth album and the first live album by the Norwegian band Madrugada. It was released on EMI records on 14 December 2005 and went on to become the highest selling release in Norway for that year, with the band's previous release The Deep End as the runner up. The songs were recorded at various locations during 2003 and 2005 as noted in the track listing. The album features the song "You Better Leave", which is still unavailable elsewhere as a recorded studio version.

The name Tralfamadore is a reference to the fictional home planet of aliens from several novels by the American science fiction author Kurt Vonnegut.

The album has sold 88,500 copies in Norway.

== Track listing (Disc 1) ==
1. "Hard to Come Back" – 04:30 - Live at Oslo Spektrum, Oslo December 2, 2005
2. "Majesty" - 06:43 - Live at Øyafestivalen, Oslo August 13, 2005
3. "You Better Leave" - 04:35 - Live at Oslo Spektrum, Oslo December 2, 2005
4. "Strange Colour Blue" - 07:19 - Live at Ancienne Belgique, Brussels March 23, 2003
5. "On Your Side" - 04:07 - Live at Oslo Spektrum, Oslo December 2, 2005
6. "The Kids Are on High Street" - 04:46 - Live at Bodø Spektrum, Bodø August 10, 2005
7. "Seven Seconds" - 03:23 - Live at Ancienne Belgique, Brussels March 23, 2003
8. "Mother of Earth" - 04:56 - Live at Oslo Spektrum, Oslo December 2, 2005
9. "Running Out of Time" - 05:52 - Live at Oslo Spektrum, Oslo December 2, 2005
10. "Black Mambo" - 07:20 - Live at Bodø Spektrum, Bodø August 10, 2005
11. "Sometimes I Feel Like a Motherless Child" - 02:28 - Live at Bodø Spektrum, Bodø August 10, 2005
12. "Sail Away" - 10:58 - Live at Øyafestivalen, Oslo August 13, 2005

== Track listing (Disc 2) ==
1. "Blood Shot Adult Commitment" - 06:24 - Live at Oslo Spektrum, Oslo December 2, 2005
2. "Black Mambo (Terror Mix)" - 07:16 - Live at Bodø Spektrum, Bodø August 10, 2005
3. "Only When You're Gone" - 07:57 - Live at Bodø Spektrum, Bodø August 10, 2005
4. "Lift Me" (single version) - 04:05
