= Lars Vaular =

Norwegian rapper and singer

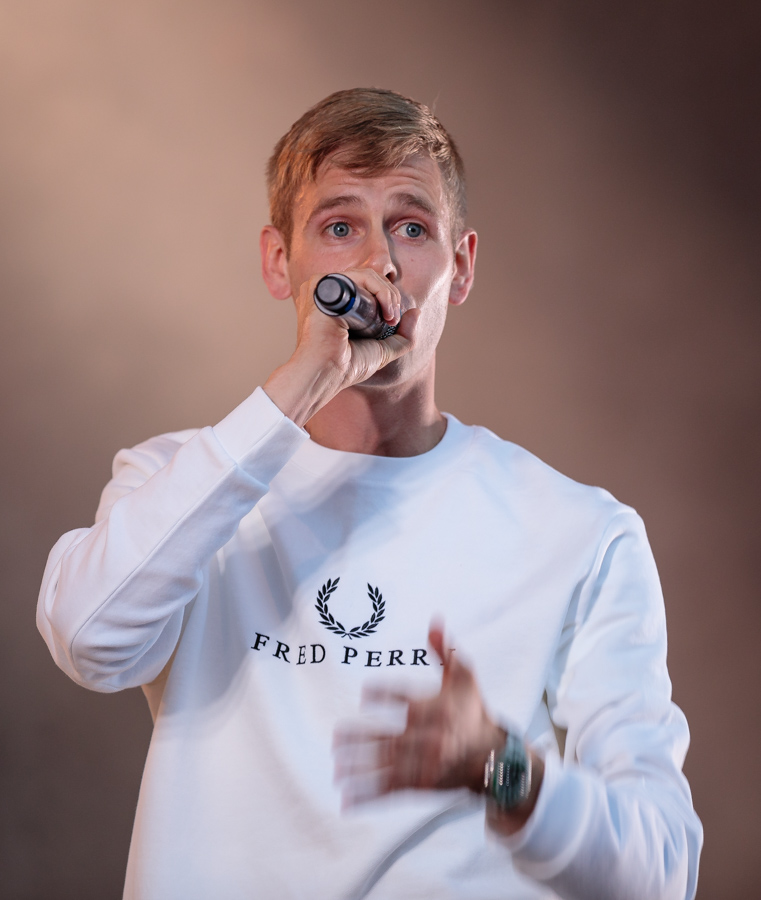
- Lars Vaular performing in 2018

Background information
- Born: Lars Nesheim Vaular; 20 September 1984 (age 42); Bergen, Norway
- Genre: Hip hop
- Occupations: Rapper, singer, songwriter
- Years active: 2003–present
- Formerly of: Tier'n og Lars
- Website: www.larsvaular.no

Lars Nesheim Vaular (born 20 September 1984) is a Norwegian rapper, singer and songwriter from Åsane, Bergen. He started rapping in 2003. He initially released songs under the duo Tier'n og Lars before going solo.

== Tier'n & Lars ==
Vaular had his beginnings as a hip hop duo formation with Fernando Manuel called Tier'n & Lars or alternatively Tier'n og Lars. The two hip hop artists with Manuel known as Tier'n cooperated with the Norwegian hip hop crew Freakshow with some tracks in a mixtape called We Are the Champions in 2004, followed the same year with Freakshow Presents Tier'n og Lars – Frykt og Avsky i Bergen. The limited edition was a promotional mixtape by the label Freakshow Mixtapes in Norway. The mixtape had cooperation from many artists including Tungtvann, Side Brok, Kleen Cut and F'EM.

In 2005, Tier'n og Lars released a street album Tilbake til stripa: Forberedelsen, available for free download with guest tracks by Even Brenna, Anand, Leeroy, DJ Leven, I. Forgot, Harry West and Nja'al, firmly establishing them as popular hip hop acts culminating in an album Kulturclash released on 23 October 2006.

== Solo career ==
Vaular debuted as a solo artist in 2007 with the album La Hat - Et nytt dagslys... followed by D'e glede in 2009 and Helt om natten, helt om dagen in 2010 as a major national release that reached top 3 on VG-lista, the official Norwegian Albums chart. He was nominated in 2009 for a Spellemannprisen (the Norwegian equivalent of the Grammys) in the hip hop category for his album D'e glede. His album Du betyr meg in 2011 reached Top 5. His new release is Flere steder alltid.

Vaular has worked with various artists like Tungtvann, Side Brok, Jan Eggum, Myra, Fjorden Baby!, Röyksopp and John Olav Nilsen & Gjengen.

== Personal life ==
Lars Vaular was criticized for the controversial track "Kem skjøt Siv Jensen" ("Who Shot Siv Jensen") about the Norwegian politician Siv Jensen, leader of the populist Progress Party. This "violence" label has followed him in many comments in social media, although he claims the song was about how people were easily fooled by the headlines they read.

Lars Vaular is the cousin of Sondre Lerche.

== Discography ==
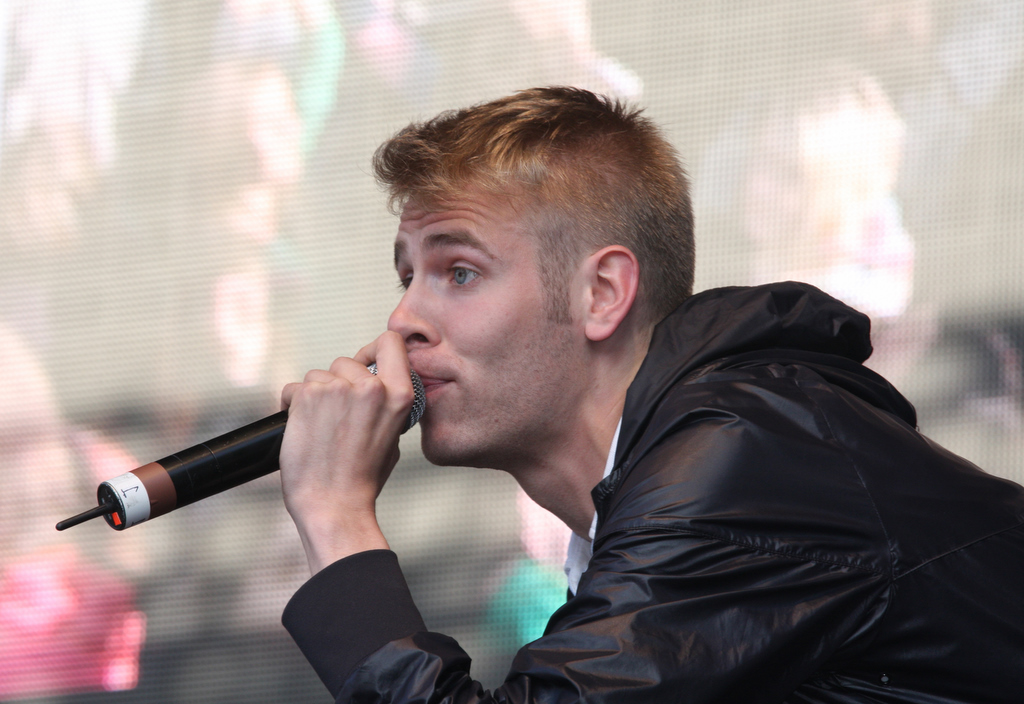
Lars Vaular in Stavanger, 2010

=== Collaborations with Freakshow ===
- 2003: Come on b/w Hva skjer (12" vinyl)
- 2004: We are the champions Mixtape

=== As Tier'n & Lars ===
- 2004: Freakshow Presents Tier'n Og Lars – Frykt og avsky i Bergen Mixtape (mixtape)
- 2005: Tilbake til stripa: Forberedelsen (street album)
- 2006: Kulturclash (album)

=== Solo albums ===
Year	Album	Peak positions	Certification
Year	Album	NOR	Certification
2007	La Hat - Et nytt dagslys...	—	
2009	D'e glede	18	
2010	Helt om natten, helt om dagen	3	
2011	Du betyr meg	5	
2013	1001 Hjem	9	
2015	666 Alt	28	
2015	666 Gir	—	
2015	666 Mening	—	
2019	Flere steder alltid	5	
2023	Vintage Velour	6	

=== Solo EPs ===
Year	Album
2010	Helt ute på EP

=== Singles ===
Year	Single	Peak positions	Certification	Album
Year	Single	NOR	Certification	Album
2010	"Rett opp & ned"	8		
2011	"Fett"	14		
2017	"Boys" (with Astrid S)	39		
2019	"Kroppsspråk"	21		
2019	"To minutter" (with Röyksopp)	31		
