= John Olav Nilsen & Gjengen =

Norwegian musical group

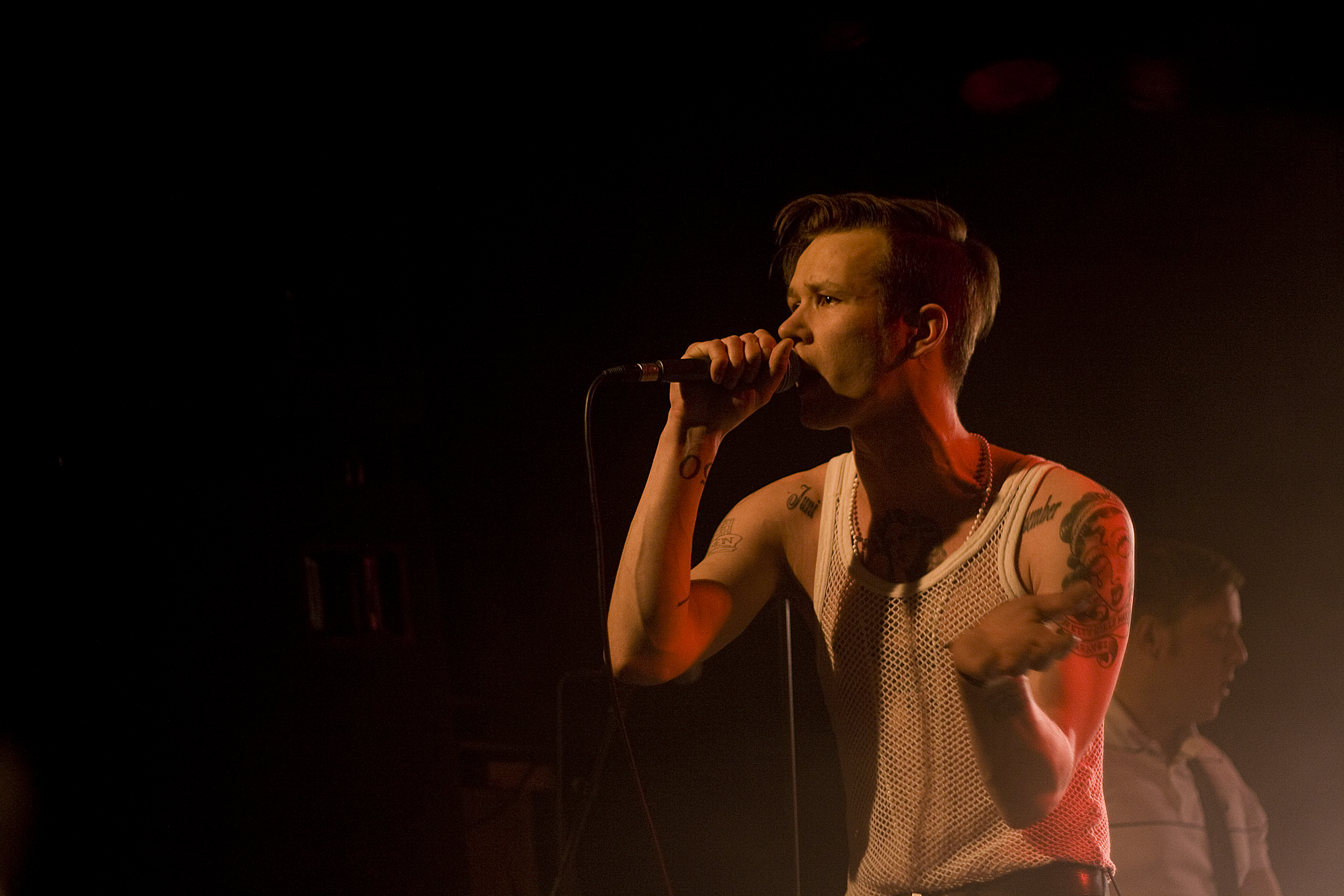
- John Olav Nilsen & Gjengen performing live in 2010

Background information
- Origin: Bergen, Norway
- Genres: Pop, rock, indie
- Years active: 2006–2013
- Labels: Opplett; Voices of Wonder; Virgin; G-huset
- Spinoffs: John Olav Nilsen & Nordsjøen
- Past members: John Olav Nilsen; Einar Vaagenes; Lars Eriksen; Andrew Amorim; Daniel Maranon; Tim Bjerke; Alastair Guilfoyle

John Olav Nilsen & Gjengen (Norwegian: John Olav Nilsen & the Gang) was a Norwegian rock-pop band formed in 2006 in Loddefjord, Bergen. It was fronted by singer-songwriter and main vocalist John Olav Nilsen, and released three studio albums before breaking up in 2013. The band's lyrics are entirely in Norwegian.

== History ==
The band was formed in 2006 and took their namesake from songwriter and frontman John Olav Nilsen (born 20 December 1982). The band played several concerts in Bergen and Western Norway during 2007 and 2008. Their song "Diamanter & Kirsebær" was released on a compilation album titled Opplett 2008 produced by the label Opplett, founded by Erlend Øye of Kings of Convenience, and featuring music from Bergen-based acts, including Fjorden Baby!, Kommode, The New Wine, Razika, Di Kjipe and Lars Vaular. Additionally, the band opened for Fjorden Baby! at a major concert on 18 December 2008.

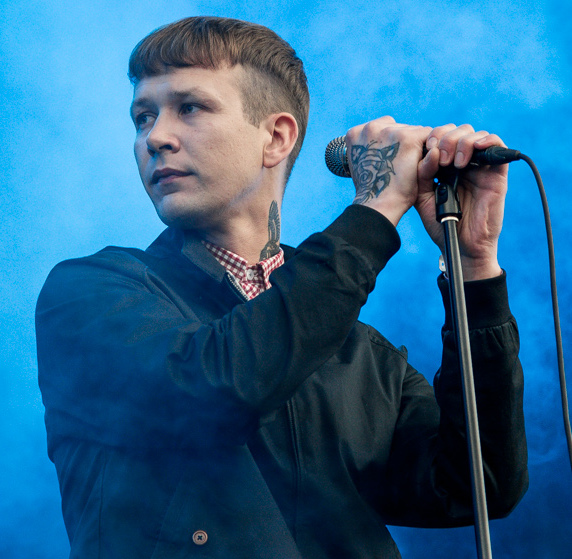
Frontman John Olav Nilsen with the band in 2013

The band was featured on a Urørt broadcast on NRK P3 in 2008 and were one of the finalists in their annual contest for unsigned band, finishing in third place. In February 2009, they performed at the by:Larm music festival in Oslo. Later that month, they were signed to Norwegian record label Voices of Wonder.

The band's debut album, For Sant Til Å Være Godt, was released on 14 September 2009 and was well-received by critics, selling over 15,000 copies. In 2010, the band won the Norwegian Grammy award Spellemannprisen in the Rock category for their debut album, in addition to being nominated for Best Newcomer.

On 7 February 2011, the band released their second album Det nærmeste du kommer followed by the single "Vinterkarusellen" with Nils Bech in February 2012. In September of that year, the band's third album, Den Eneste Veien Ut, was released. In September 2013, Nilsen declared that the band had broken up. On 13 February 2015, the band's former frontman Nilsen was convicted of violence, theft and possession of amphetamine and sentenced in Bergen District Court to 60 days of prison. The drug charges were later dropped.

In 2016, Nilsen formed John Olav Nilsen & Nordsjøen (Norwegian: John Olav Nilsen & the North Sea) with former Gjengen-bandmates Einar Vaagenes and Lars Eriksen. The band released their debut album, Nordsjøen, in 2017, followed by their second studio album, Det store i det små, in 2020.

== Discography ==
=== Albums ===
- For Sant Til Å Være Godt (Too True To Be Good) (2009)
- Det Nærmeste Du Kommer (The Closest You Get) (2011)
- Den Eneste Veien Ut (The Only Way Out) (2012)

=== Singles ===
- 2009: "Ti Ganger Tusen"
- 2009: "Valiumsvalsen"
- 2009: "Hull I Himmelen"
- 2011: "Skrekkfilm"
- 2011: "Hundeår"
- 2011: "Klokkene"
- 2012: "Vinterkarusellen"
- 2012: "Eurosport"
- 2012: "Nesten Som Eg Lever"
- 2013: "Bensinbarn"

== Awards ==
- 2009: Spellemannprisen in the category Rock, for the album For Sant Til Å Være Godt

Awards
Preceded by Lukestar	Recipient of the Rock Spellemannprisen; 2009	Succeeded by Kvelertak
