= Madrugada (band) =

Norwegian rock band

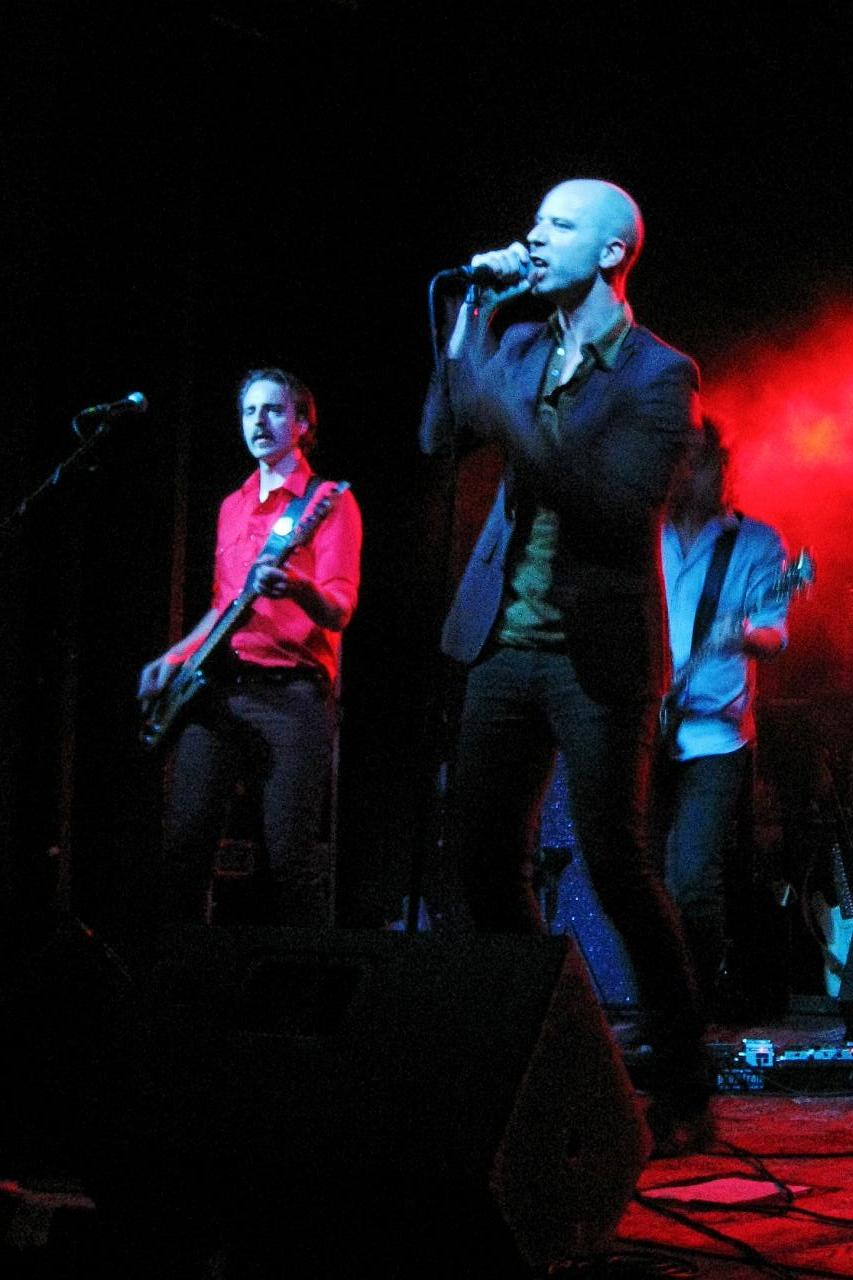
- Frode Jacobsen (L) and Sivert Høyem in 2008

Background information
- Also known as: Abbey's Adoption
- Origin: Stokmarknes, Norway
- Genres: Alternative rock; dark country; folk
- Years active: 1993–2008, 2018–present
- Labels: EMI/Virgin
- Members: Sivert Høyem; Frode Jacobsen; Jon Lauvland Pettersen
- Past members: Robert Burås; Erland Dahlen; Simen Vangen; Marius Johansen; Mikael Lindqvist
- Website: madrugada.no

Madrugada is a Norwegian alternative rock band formed in Stokmarknes in 1993, with a core lineup of Sivert Høyem (vocals), Robert Burås (guitar), and Frode Jacobsen (bass). Following Burås' death on 12 July 2007, Høyem and Jacobsen decided to finish recording what was to be their final album in the original lineup. On 21 January 2008, the band released Madrugada and announced that they would split after one last tour. They performed their final concert on 15 November 2008.

In June 2018, it was announced that Høyem, Jacobsen, and Lauvland Pettersen had reformed the band for a series of shows in 2019.

Madrugada's musical style is noted for "its bareboned blues-inspired alt-rock". The band's name means "dawn" in Spanish and Portuguese.

== History ==
The group of musicians that would go on to become Madrugada formed in the town of Stokmarknes in 1993 under the name Abbey's Adoption. The band members at this time included Jon Lauvland Pettersen (drums), Frode Jacobsen (bass), Sivert Høyem (vocals), and Marius 'Wah Wah' Johansen (guitar). In 1995, they were joined by guitarist Robert Burås and made the decision to move to Oslo, after which Johansen departed. By 1998, the band had been signed to a six-album deal by Virgin Music Norway, and after a chance meeting with Norwegian author and poet Øystein Wingaard Wolf in a bar, changed their name to Madrugada.

Their debut album, Industrial Silence, was released on 30 August 1999 to critical acclaim and was followed by The Nightly Disease, in 2001.

After personal relations became fraught, Pettersen left the band in early 2002 and was replaced by Simen Vangen. Soon afterwards, work began on a third album, Grit.

Madrugada finished working on their fourth album, The Deep End, in late 2004. Recorded at Sound City in Los Angeles with producer George Drakoulias, it was released on 28 February 2005 in Norway, on 31 March in the rest of Europe, and finally in the US on 11 April. The lead single, "The Kids Are on High Street", was released for domestic radio play on 14 January, and a music video was filmed in London. Vangen announced his departure in early 2005, stating that he wished to focus on various jazz-related projects, leaving the band without a permanent drummer.

On 14 December 2005, Madrugada released the album Live at Tralfamadore, (named after the fictional home planet of aliens from several novels by American author Kurt Vonnegut). By the end of 2005 and less than a month after its release, it became the highest-selling album in Norway for that year, with The Deep End as the runner-up. The year was capped off with Madrugada winning three awards at the annual Spellemannprisen—the Norwegian equivalent of the Grammys. They won in the Best Rock Album, Best Song, and Spellemann of the Year categories.

Following this successful period, the band members focused on various side projects. Høyem released his second solo album, Exiles, in 2006, while Burås and his band My Midnight Creeps released their second album, Histamin, in March 2007.

The band reconvened in the spring of 2007 with Industrial Silence, Nightly Disease, and Histamin producer John Agnello to begin work on their fifth album, but on 12 July 2007, Robert Burås was found dead in his Oslo apartment; he was 31 years old.

Following the release of the new single "Look Away Lucifer", on 10 December 2007, the band's final, self-titled album was eventually published on 21 January 2008. The majority of guitar tracks had been recorded before Burås' death.

In the spring of 2008, joined by My Midnight Creeps guitarist Alex Kloster-Jensen and friend of the band Cato Thomassen, Madrugada embarked on a tour throughout Europe.

In 2010, a career-spanning double album was released, entitled The Best of Madrugada. It included one new track, "All This Wanting to Be Free".

On 15 June 2018, it was announced via the band's Facebook page that Madrugada had reunited with original drummer Jon Lauvland Pettersen, and a 2019 European tour was planned.

== Band members ==
Current

- Sivert Høyem – vocals (1993–2008, 2018–present)
- Frode Jacobsen – bass (1993–2008, 2018–present)
- Jon Lauvland Pettersen – drums (1993–2002, 2018–present)

Past

- Robert Burås – guitar (1993–2007, died in 2007)
- Erland Dahlen – drums (2005–2008)
- Simen Vangen – drums (2002–2005)
- Marius "Wah Wah" Johansen – guitar (1993–1995)

Live

- Erland Dahlen – percussion (2019)
- Mikael Lindqvist – piano, keyboards
- Fredrik Viklund – guitar, keyboards (2005–2006)
- Alexander Kloster-Jensen – guitar, keyboards (2008)
- Cato Thomassen – guitar, keyboards (2008, 2019)
- Christer Knutsen - guitar, keyboards (2019)

== Awards ==
- 1999: Spellemannprisen in the category Best Rock Band, for Industrial Silence
- 1999: Spellemannprisen in the category Newcomer of the Year, for Industrial Silence
- 2002: Spellemannprisen in the category Best Rock Band, for Grit
- 2005: Spellemannprisen in the category Best Rock Band, for The Deep End
- 2005: Spellemannprisen in the category Hit of the Year, together with Ane Brun, for "Lift me"
- 2005: Spellemannprisen in the category Spellemann of the Year
- 2006: Spellemannprisen in the category Best Rock Band, for Live at Tralfamadore
- 2008: Spellemannprisen in the category Music Video of the Year, for "Look Away Lucifer"
- 2022: Spellemannprisen in the category Best Rock Band, for Madrugada 2022

== Discography ==
=== Studio albums ===
- Industrial Silence (1999)
- The Nightly Disease (2001)
- Grit (2002)
- The Deep End (2005)
- Madrugada (2008)
- Chimes at Midnight (2022)

=== EPs ===
- Madrugada EP (1998)
- New Depression EP (1999)
- Electric (2000)
- Higher EP (2000)
- Hands Up – I Love You (2001)
- A Deadend Mind (2001)
- Ready (2002)

=== Live albums ===
- Live at Tralfamadore (2005)
- The Industrial Silence Tour 2019 (Live at Rockaplast) (2023)

=== Compilations ===
- B-sides and Rarities from Industrial Silence (1999)
- B-sides and Rarities from The Nightly Disease (2001)
- The Best of Madrugada (2010)

=== Singles ===
- "Beautyproof" (2000)
- "Majesty" (2003)
- "The Kids Are on High Street" (2005)
- "Hold on to You" (2005)
- "Stories from the Streets" (2005)
- "Lift Me" (featuring Ane Brun) (2005)
- "Look Away Lucifer" (2008)
- "What's on Your Mind?" (2008)
- "Half-Light" (2019)
- "Nobody Loves You Like I Do" (2021)
- "Dreams at Midnight" (2021)
- "The World Could Be Falling Down" (2021)
- "Ecstasy" (2021)
- "If I Was the Captain of This Ship" (2022)

Awards
Preceded by Midnight Choir	Recipient of the Rock Spellemannprisen; 1999	Succeeded by Motorpsycho
Preceded by Kaizers Orchestra	Recipient of the Rock Spellemannprisen; 2002	Succeeded by Turboneger
Preceded by WE	Recipient of the Rock Spellemannprisen; 2005	Succeeded by 120 Days
Preceded by Odd Nordstoga	Recipient of the Spellemannprisen as This year's Spellemann; 2005	Succeeded by Vamp
