= Frode Jacobsen =

- Birth name: Frode Jacobsen
- Born: May 11, 1974 Stokmarknes, Norway
- Occupation(s): Musician, bass guitarist, songwriter and record producer
- Formerly of: Madrugada

Frode Jacobsen (born 11 June 1974) is a musician, bass guitarist, songwriter and record producer from Stokmarknes in Norway.

He is the founding member of the band Madrugada, one of the most successful acts in Norwegian musical history. Jacobsen is credited as songwriter on all the songs of Madrugada. He produced/co-produced several of the band's albums in addition to producing albums by Savoy, Howl, Ingrid Olava, Phaedra, Kitchie Kitchie Ki Me O.

Following the death of friend and bandmate Robert Buras in 2007 and the demise of Madrugada in 2008, Jacobsen joined the remains of Buràs' band My Midnight Creeps to form a new band, Kitchie Kitchie Ki Me O. They released their self-titled debut album in June 2011, co-produced by Jacobsen with a follow-up expected sometime in 2014.
