= Bendik Brænne =

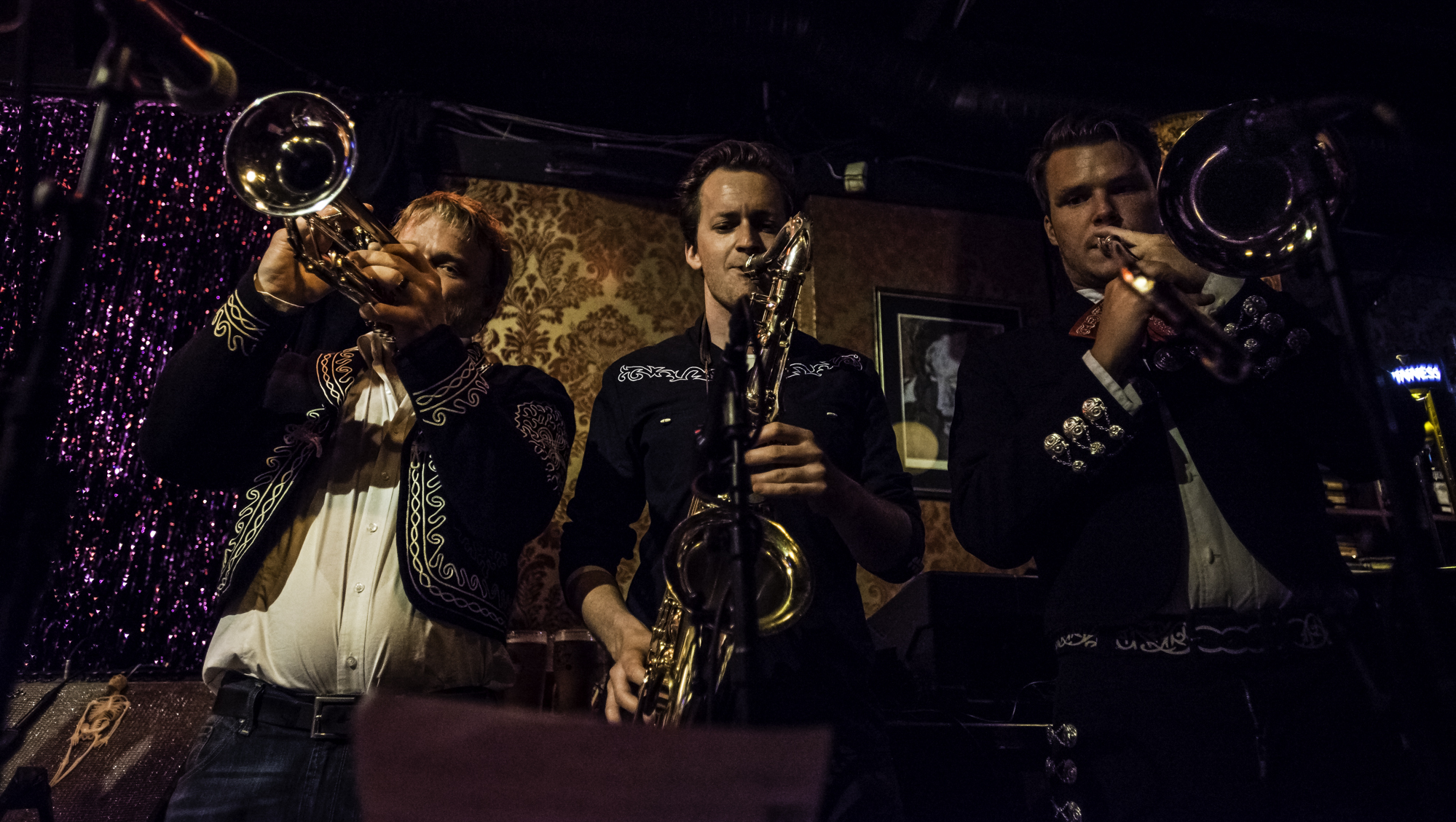
- Bendik Brænne (centre) playing with Los Plantronics

Background information
- Born: 17 August 1987 (age 39); Bærum, Akershus, Norway
- Genres: Americana, rock
- Occupations: Vocals, saxophone, piano, guitar
- Years active: 2001–present
- Labels: Bendix Records, Snaxville Recordings

Bendik Brænne (born 17 August 1987) is a Norwegian singer-songwriter, multi-instrumentalist, record producer and arranger. He is the son of the late actor, playwright and author Trond Brænne. Growing up in a family with a strong connection to the arts, Brænne began writing songs with his older brother, Mattis Brænne Wigestrand, in the basement of their childhood home. At the time, both played in separate ska and punk bands and initially wrote material for their respective groups. Their collaboration continued beyond those early projects and has remained an important part of Brænne's musical career.

Alongside his solo work, Brænne has established himself as a record producer, arranger and session musician. He has worked across a wide range of musical styles, producing and arranging recordings for Norwegian artists while also contributing as a saxophonist, guitarist and keyboard player. As a backing musician and studio performer, he has appeared on releases by artists including Kurt Nilsen, Backstreet Girls, DumDum Boys and Jonas Alaska, among many others.

In 2010, Brænne was nominated for the Brage Prize in the children's literature category together with his father, Trond Brænne, and his sister, Kaia Brænne.

Brænne released his debut solo album, How to Fake It in America, in March 2013. The album won the Spellemansprisen for Best Country Album. Later that year he released the EP Aloha from Torshov.

His second album, Do You Know Who I Think I Am, was released in October 2014 and received a Spellemansprisen nomination. His third album, The Last Great Country Swindle, followed on 1 September 2017. Featuring Canadian singer-songwriter Daniel Romano and members of Los Plantronics, the album won Brænne his second Spellemansprisen for Best Country Album.

In 2018, Brænne released Benedictionary, an album for which he wrote, arranged, recorded, produced and performed all the music, as well as designing the artwork. He followed it with Personal Best? (2020), Birds Are Real (2023) and Banos (2026).

In addition to his solo career, Brænne has been involved in numerous collaborative projects as a producer, arranger and performer. His work spans rock, pop, country, Americana and children's music, and he has contributed to recordings, live performances and theatre productions for a broad range of Norwegian artists and ensembles.

Brænne is also a member of the pop-punk band The Needs, alongside musicians known for their work with Kvelertak, Oslo Ess and Honningbarna.

== Discography ==
Solo Discography

- 2026: Banos (Bendix)
- 2025: Honkin Holidays (Bendix)
- 2023: Birds are Real (Bendix)
- 2020: Personal Best? (Bendix)
- 2018: Benedictionary (Bendix)
- 2017: The last great country swindle (Bendix)
- 2014: Do you know who I think I am (Snaxville)
- 2013: Aloha from Torshov EP (Snaxville)
- 2013: How to Fake It in America (Snaxville)

With The Needs

- 2021: You Need the Needs (Jansen)
- 2019: You Need the Needs (Jansen)

With Los Plantronics

- 2017: The worst is yet to come (Jansen)
- 2015: Surfing Times (Jansen)
- 2011: Organic Voodoo Soup (Jansen)

With Amund Maarud

- 2015: Volt (Snaxville)
- 2012: Dirt (Snaxville)
- 2011: Electric (Snaxville)

With No Torso

- 2008: Ready Already
- 2006: Several Brains
- 2004: Fatal Fraud

Other projects

- 2026: Full Tilt Boogie, with Backstreet Girls
- 2025: Back from the sea, with The Laundrettes
- 2025: 14 år, with Odd Erik Lothe
- 2025: Enda mer Stjerner og fyrverkeri, with SaraLy
- 2025: Å Leve i en By, with Anders Eidsvold
- 2025: Sunset Solace, with Marius Lien
- 2025: Jakta på jula, with Daniel Kvammen
- 2025: Siste sjanse, with Kristian Kaupang
- 2024: Spiller Lillebjørn, with Thea and the wild
- 2024: Poetically True, with Even Martinsen
- 2024: 5 O'clock man, with Lady Friend
- 2024: En fot ut døra, with Yngvild
- 2024: STIL, with Blomst
- 2024: Off Leash, with Embla and the Karidotters
- 2024: Ta meg hjem igjen, with Humle
- 2024: Mer Stjerner og fyrverkeri, with SaraLy
- 2024: Jadda, with Staut
- 2024: Belladonna, with Petter Baarli
- 2024: Fashion Victims, with Fashion Victims
- 2024: Can I get some adult supervision, with Feber
- 2023: Sanger og fyrverkeri, with SaraLy
- 2023: We the Thee, with Thee K-Otics
- 2023: Feelantropico, with Akersborg
- 2023: Oslo Ess, with Oslo Ess
- 2023: Blomsterspråk, with Roger Græsberg
- 2023: She, with Endre Nordvik
- 2023: Summetonar, with Stedje, Lothe, Tokvam
- 2022: Takomaha, with Takomaha
- 2022: Early arbo ashtar...., with Kosmik Boogie Tribe
- 2022: Raus, with Amund Maarud & Jace Everett
- 2022: Raging River, with Benedicte Brænden
- 2022: Phases, with Unnveig aas
- 2022: Fountain of St. Kathrina, with Leifson
- 2022: Bonnie and the Jets, with Bonnie and the Jets
- 2022: Sommerregn, with Roger Græsberg
- 2022: Sanger ingen skjønner, with Kigo
- 2022: Jaguar, with Odd Erik Lothe & Mighty Magnolias
- 2022: Sorry, Tom, with Kristian Kaupang
- 2021: Paradis Kitty, with Dinosaurtegning
- 2021: La det fine skine, with Odd Erik Lothe
- 2021: Leaving, longing, loving, with Robert Moses
- 2021: Blå Song, with Hellbillies
- 2021: Better Angles, with Adam Douglas
- 2021: Pønk, rock og harde kår, with Oslo Ess
- 2020: Snøfnugg, with Inge Bremnes
- 2020: Rock Omelette, with Mats Wawa
- 2020: Magnolianesque, with Mighty Magnolias
- 2020: Six string holiday, with Perry Dear and the Deerstalkers
- 2020: Travels, with Endre Nordvik
- 2020: The Backbouncebillity of humans, with Harald Thune
- 2020: I morra kjører jeg forbi, with Kristian Kaupang
- 2020: Rock Omelette, with Mats Wawa
- 2020: Eksil på Sundrehall, with Hellbillies
- 2020: After the bees, with Øyvind Holm
- 2020: Don't Remember - Can't Forget, with Alxsander Pettersen
- 2019: Love, with Torgeir Waldemar
- 2019: Young Heart, with Unnveig Aas
- 2019: MamaLove, with Queendome
- 2019: Norwegicana, with Jack Stillwater
- 2018: Good times ar bad times for somebody, with Numa Edema
- 2018: The Letter, with Alexander Pettersen
- 2018: Unknown skyline, with Mighty Magnolias
- 2018: Drømmen drømmerne drømmer, with Hubbabubbaklubb
- 2018: Kløyvd, with Odd Nordstoga
- 2018: References pt.2, with Malin Pettersen
- 2018: All city, with Label
- 2018: Heines sommerfavoritter Vol.2, with Heine Totland
- 2018: Gold, with Endre Nordvik
- 2018: Unbridled & Ablaze, with Zialand
- 2017: Oslo - Harlem , with BAYA
- 2017: World wide frequency, with Wild Man Riddim
- 2017: Mykje lyd , with Odd Nordstoga
- 2017: A Keen Eye for the Obvious, with Thulsa Doom
- 2017: Don't Mess with My Rock'n Roll, with Backstreet Girls
- 2017: Fear Is a Deamon, with Jonas Alaska
- 2017: Pop Noir, with Øystein Greni
- 2017: Amazing, with Kurt Nilsen
- 2017: Life of A Rudeboy, with Fyah George
- 2016: Predikant, with Predikant
- 2016: Divided, with Tommy Kristiansen
- 2016: Hopp Karoline, with Krom
- 2016: Mosaics, with Hard Luck Street
- 2016: Medicine, with Simen Aanerud
- 2016: Superkrefter, with Dizzet ft. Admiral P
- 2015: The Better End, with Caddy
- 2015: Durg natt, with Anders Bjørnvold
- 2015: Wild Man Riddim, with Wild Man Riddim
- 2014: Jump, with Queendom
- 2014: Manjolia mountains, with Manjolia mountains
- 2014: Bli her til eg dør, with Iselin Andreasen
- 2014: Bless Us All - Songs of Mickey Newbury, with Paal Flaata
- 2014: Will ni åka mer, with Senjahopen
- 2014: Green Means Walk Red Means Run, with Shaun Bartlett
- 2014: Alt, with West Bank Robbers
- 2014: Frode Johansen, with Frode Johansen
- 2014: Kall det hva du vil, with Herreløse
- 2014: Porterville, with Porterville
- 2014: Bli her til eg dør, with Iselin Andresen
- 2014: ...The Further Out You Get, with The South
- 2013: Glimpse of What We Had, with The South
- 2013: Violent Hippies, with Popgun
- 2013: Della Loved Steve, with Grand Island
- 2013: If Only As a Ghost, with Jonas Alaska
- 2013: Inertia, with Gina Aspenes
- 2013: Selections, Images under constructions, with Dandylion
- 2013: Ikkje vekk mæ før æ våkna, with Julie Willumsen
- 2013: My Sun, with Mona & Maria
- 2012: Sing Like Me, with Stina Stenerud & Her Soul Replacement
- 2012: Dead Man's Shoes, with The Lucky Bullets
- 2012: Images Under Construction, with Dandylion
- 2012: Ti liv, with Dumdum Boys
- 2011: Prairie Sun, with Orbo & Longshots
- 2011: Melodi Grand Prix 2011, with Melodi Grand Prix
- 2011: Joy Visible, with Foyn Trio
- 2011: Jobber overtid, with Admiral P
- 2010: Go and Tell, with SUM
- 2010: Den unge Fleksnes, with Den unge Fleksnes
- 2010: Live 10, with Orbo & Longshots
- 2010: Live fr Operaen, dugnad for Haiti, with Forente artister
- 2010: Elevator Sessions, with Paul Tonning
- 2010: Dugnad for Haiti - Live fra Operaen, with various artists
- 2009: Public Treason, with Fence
- 2009: Hooga Island, with Hooga Troopers
- 2009: Masquerade, with Orbo & the Longshots
- 2009: Soul Deep, with Noora Noor
- 2009: Appelsinpiken, with various artists
- 2009: Abracadabra, with Bazooka Boppers
- 2008: Røde Hunder, with Trond Brænne
- 2008: Himmelblå, with "various artists"
- 2008: Absolute music 20, with various artists
- 2008: Worry No, with "Chris lee"
- 2008: Welcome to Annoying Town, with Domi
- 2008: Shrink the City to a Light, with Shaun Bartlett
- 2008: Put a Little Grease on my Axe, with Grand Cafe
- 2007: Troll, with Trond Brænne

== Awards ==
- 2018 – Won the Spellemannprisen for The last great country swindle
- 2015 – Nominated to Spellemannprisen for Do you know who I think I am
- 2014 – Won the Spellemannprisen for How to fake it in America
- 2014 – Nominated to the Bendiksen Award
- 2013 – Nominated to Kulturdepartementets priser for barne- og ungdomslitteratur for the book series Dyra på gåren
- 2010 – Nominated to the Brage Prize in "Billedbøker for barn og/eller voksne" for Uvenner
