= 1982 in Norwegian music =

The following is a list of notable events and releases of the year 1982 in Norwegian music.

== Events ==
=== April ===
- 2 – The 9th Vossajazz started in Vossavangen, Norway (April 2 – 4).

=== May ===
- 26 – 10th Nattjazz started in Bergen, Norway (May 26 – June 9).

=== June ===
- 27 – The 13th Kalvøyafestivalen started at Kalvøya near by Oslo.

== Albums released ==
=== Unknown date ===
A

Arild Andersen

- Lifelines (ECM Records)

G

Jan Garbarek

- Paths, Prints (ECM Records), with Bill Frisell, Eberhard Weber, and Jon Christensen
- Trip to Prillarguri (Soul Note Records), with George Russell Sextet

Haakon Graf

- Hideaway (Strawberry Records) with Jon Christensen and Sveinung Hovensjø

K

Karin Krog

- Two Of A Kind (Four Leaf Records) with Bengt Hallberg

Bjørn Kruse / Olav Berg / Nils Henrik Asheim / Kjell Samkopf

- Contemporary Music From Norway (Four Leaf Records) with The Norwegian Contemporary Music Ensemble

N

Lillebjørn Nilsen

- Original Nilsen (Studio B Records)

R

Inger Lise Rypdal

- Kontakt (Talent Records)

T

Radka Toneff

- Fairytales (Odin Records) with Steve Dobrogosz

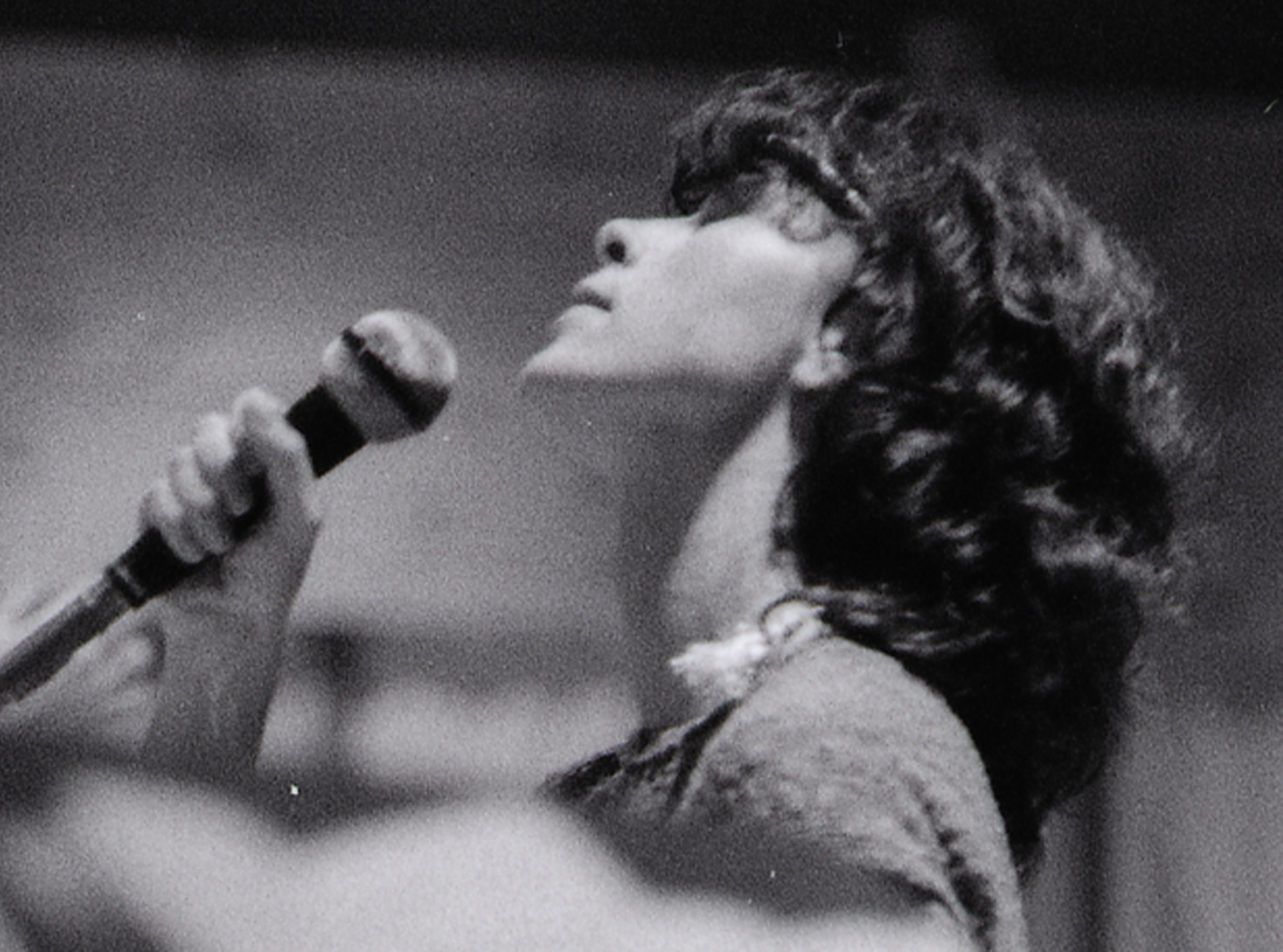
Radka Toneff 1982 in Bergen, Norway.

== Deaths ==
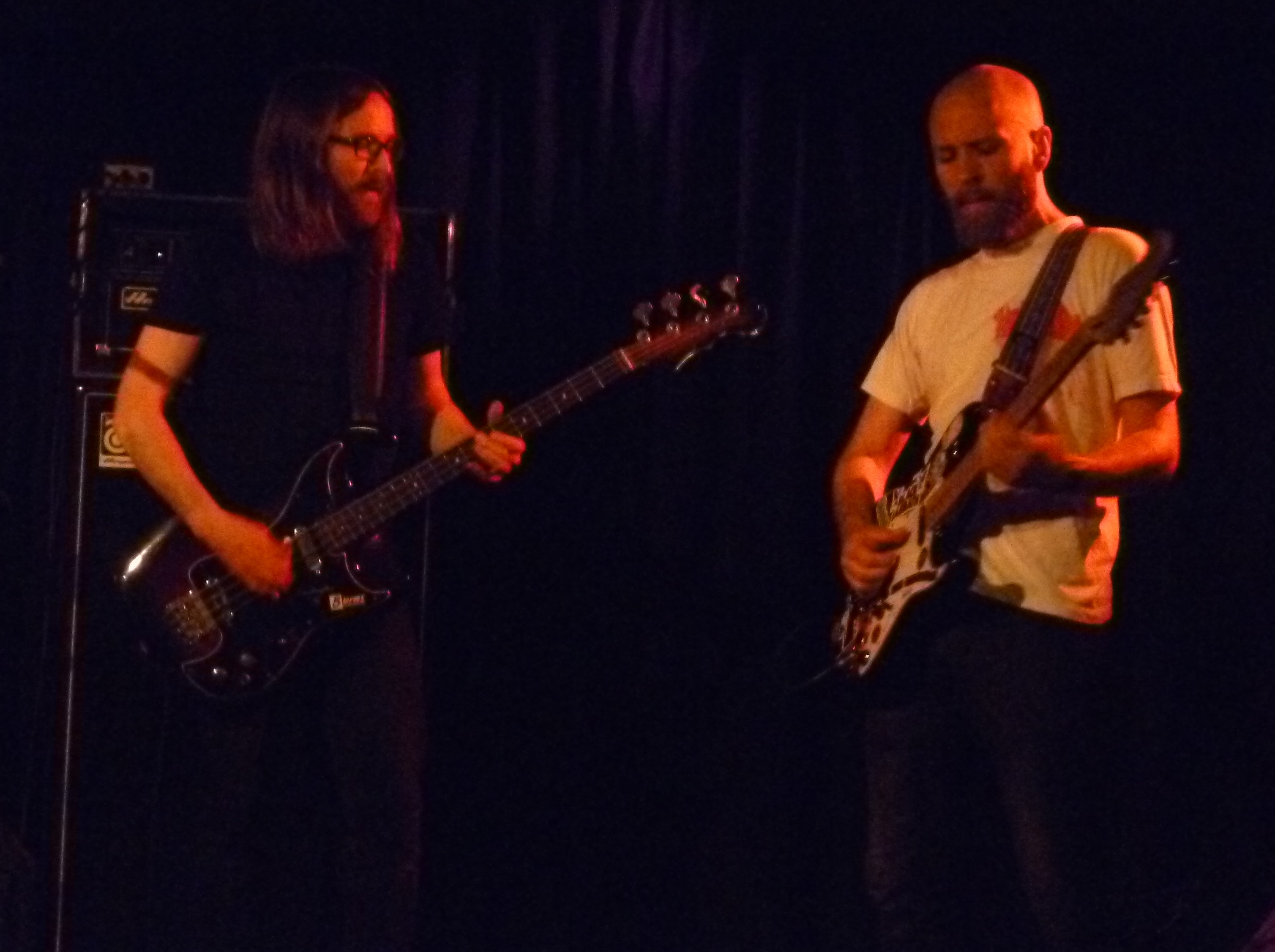
Even Helte Hermansen and Trond Frønes with Red Kite at the 2016 Nattjazz.

October

- 21 – Radka Toneff, jazz singer (born 1952).

November

- 27 – Jonas Brunvoll, Jr., operatic singer and actor (born 1920).

== Births ==
January

- 1 – Andreas Lønmo Knudsrød, jazz drummer.
- 19 – Maria Solheim, singer and songwriter.

February

- 4 – Hedvig Mollestad Thomassen, jazz guitarist, vocalist, and composer.
- 12 – Øyvind Hegg-Lunde, jazz drummer and percussionist.
- 13 – Even Helte Hermansen, jazz guitarist

March

- 8 – Isak Strand, drummer and electronica artist, Me At Sea.
- 9 – Gunnar Greve, talent manager, A&R, producer, songwriter, record executive and vocalist.
- 27 – Admiral P, singer, songwriter, and reggae artist.

April

- 2 – Daniel Herskedal, jazz tubist and composer.
- 9 – Øyvind Skarbø, drummer and composer.
- 21 – Ørjan Hartveit, classical baritone singer.

June

- 14 – Anders Jektvik, singer, songwriter and guitarist.
- 28 – Simen Aanerud, musician and inventor.

July

- 6 – Petter Vågan, guitarist, singer, and composer.
- 27 – Kristin Minde, pop singer and pianist.

August

- 7 – Anders Hana, jazz guitarist and composer.

September

- 5 – Sondre Lerche, singer, songwriter and multi-instrumentalist.

November

- 24 – Therese Birkelund Ulvo, contemporary composer and music producer.
- 29 – Marthe Valle, singer and songwriter.

December

- 17 – Stephan Meidell, guitarist and composer.

Unknown date

- Håvard Lothe, vocalist and guitarist.

== See also ==
- 1982 in Norway
- Music of Norway
- Norway in the Eurovision Song Contest 1982
