= 1952 in Norwegian music =

The following is a list of notable events and releases of the year 1952 in Norwegian music.

== Deaths ==
April

- 21 – Alfred Andersen-Wingar, composer and orchestra conductor (born 1869).

December

- 14 – Fartein Valen, composer and musical theorist (born 1887).

== Births ==
February

- 20 – Halvor Haug, composer.
- 22 – Soon-Mi Chung, violinist, viola player, and musical director.

April

- 9 – Magnar Åm, composer
- 25 – Ketil Bjørnstad, pianist, composer and author

May

- 3 – Henning Sommerro, pianist, composer, and professor at NTNU.

June

- 6 – Kjell Samkopf, drummer and composer.
- 12 – Bent Patey, guitarist, composer and writer.
- 14 – Trond-Viggo Torgersen, physician, broadcaster, television host, comedian, singer, and songwriter.
- 19 – Sidsel Endresen, jazz vocalist, composer and actor.
- 25 – Radka Toneff, jazz singer (died 1982).

August

- 11 – Finn Sletten, jazz drummer

September

- 9 – Per Jørgensen, jazz trumpeter

October

- 3 – Øyvind Rauset, artist, musician and composer.

November

- 8 – Carl Haakon Waadeland, musicologist and drummer
- 28 – Ole Thomsen, jazz guitarist

December

- 16 – Jon Laukvik, organist

== See also ==
- 1952 in Norway
- Music of Norway
