= How to Fake It in America =

Studio album by Bendik Brænne
- Released: 2013
- Genre: Americana, country
- Length: 33:03
- Label: Snaxville Recordings
- Producer: Bendik Brænne; Erick Jaskowiak (co-producer)

Professional ratings
Review scores
| Source | Rating |
|---|---|
| Aftenbladet | 5/6 stars |
| Adresseavisen | 5/6 stars |
| Hamar Arbeiderblad | 4/6 stars |
| Firdaposten | 5/6 stars |

How to Fake It in America is an album by Bendik Brænne. The album won the Spellemannsprisen (Norwegian Grammy Awards) in 2013 for best country album.

== Track listing ==
1. "Still Too Small"
2. "Curtis Came to Stay"
3. "Northern Sky"
4. "Hey Gillian!"
5. "Never Seen a Brighter Shade"
6. "Big White House"
7. "Orange St."
8. "Chuck Wagon Rag"
9. "Turn My Way" (Featuring Bobby Keys)

== Personnel ==
- Andy Hall - dobro
- Bobby Keys - saxophone
- Bryan Owings - drums
- Fats Kaplin - lap Steel, mandolin, fiddle
- Rob McNelley - guitar
- Steven Sheehan - acoustic guitar
- Tim Marks - electric and upright bass
- Amund Maarud - guitar, engineer
- Bendik Brænne - vocals, piano, saxophone, engineer
- Eivind Solheim - trumpet
- Hans F. Friis - trombone, backup vocals
- Jakob Jones - backup vocals
- Lars Oskarsen - backup vocals
- Lars Erik Larsen - backup vocals, bass
- Lasse Hafreager - organ
- Magnus Tveten - backup vocals
- Morten Krogh Hagen - double bass
- Tuva Andersen - vocals
- Øystein Frantzvåg - backup vocals, mixer
- Eivind H. Natvig - photographer
- Stefan C. Wold - cover design
- Erick Jaskowiak - engineer
- Brett Lind - assistant engineer
- Vegard K. Sleipnes - engineer
- Johnny Skalleberg - mixer
- Henrik Maarud - mixer
- Bryan Lucey - mastering
