= The Last Great Country Swindle =

Album by Bendik Brænne

The last great country swindle

Studio album by Bendik Brænne
- Released: 2017
- Genre: Americana, country
- Length: 31:18
- Label: Bendix Records
- Producer: Bendik Brænne; Daniel Romano, Lars Erik Larsen (co-producer)

Professional ratings
Review scores
Source	Rating
Aftenbladet	5/6 stars
Dagbladet	5/6 stars
itromsø	5/6 stars
Klassekampen	5/6 stars

The last great country swindle is the third solo album from Bendik Brænne. The album won Spellemannsprisen in 2017, for best Country album.

== Track listing ==
1. "Runaway"
2. "Ain't nobody like be"
3. "Summerfiled"
4. "I'll be gone tomorrow!"
5. "Worries me"
6. "Quick loving hearts"
7. "I got (every thing but you)"
8. "Close to the ground"
9. "Sunshower"
10. "Runaway" (outro)

== Personnel ==
- Daniel Romano – Guitar, back voc, synth, drums, co – producer
- Lars Erik Larsen – Bass, back voc, co – producer
- Kjetil Johan Jakobsen – drums, back voc
- Martin Windstad – Percussion
- David Wallumrød – Hammond Organ A-100, Piano
- Amund Maarud – guitar
- Bendik Brænne – vocals, piano, flute, engineer, producer, piano
- Eivind Solheim – trumpet
- Sindre Blostrupmoen – trumpet
- Mari Persen – strings
- Dan Weston – mix
- Greg Calbi – mastering
