= Simen Aanerud =

Norwegian pianist

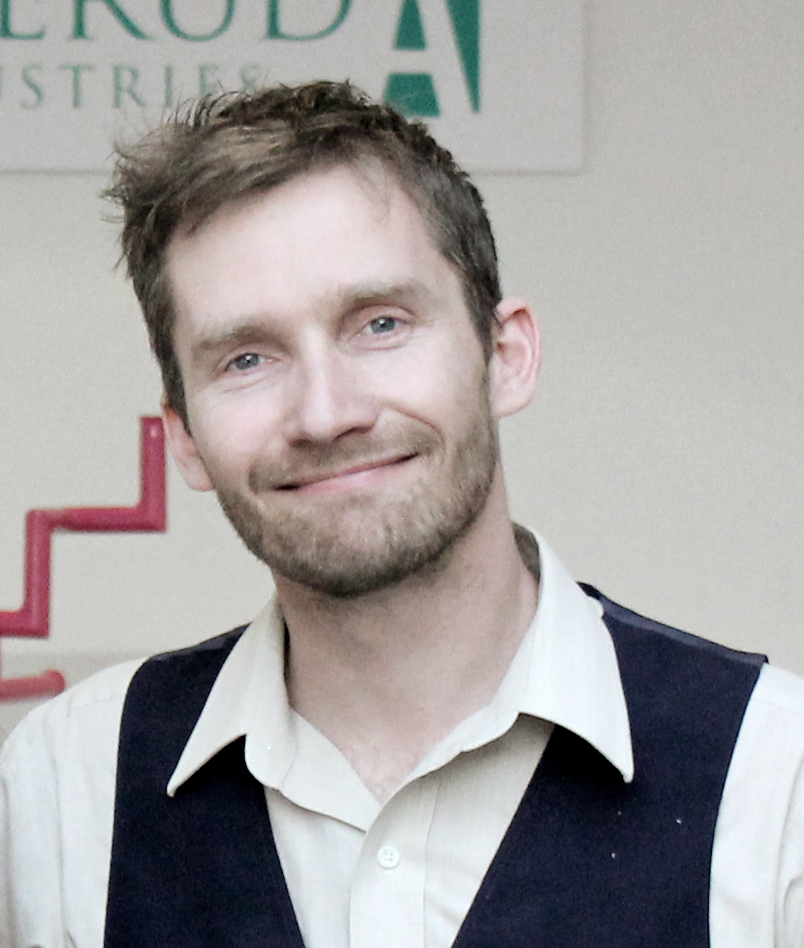
- Simen Aanerud, Norwegian musician

Background information
- Born: Simen Aanerud; 28 June 1981 (age 44); Nes, Akershus, Norway
- Origin: Norway
- Genres: Blues
- Occupation: Musician
- Instrument: Piano
- Years active: 1993–present

Simen Aanerud (born 28 June 1981) is a Norwegian musician from Nes in Akershus. He is best known as a pianist.

Aanerud is known as a blues pianist, both in Norway and New Zealand. He has played with artists such as Tim Finn, Gin Wigmore, Amund Maarud, Stellar* and Darcy Perry.

== Life and career ==
Aanerud's career as a musician started as a 12-year-old, with Amund Maarud and Henrik Maarud in the band MaarudKara. This band came second in the national TV-show Talentiaden on NRK in 1997, and released the album First Blues on Tylden & Co. In 2001 he moved to Auckland, New Zealand, where he furthered his career as a pianist. He joined blues guitarist Darcy Perry in 2002, and shortly after released the album Blues4Dad. In 2003 and 2005 they also released the albums Don't Hold Back and Heavy Rain. While working with several artists in New Zealand, Aanerud also created his own bands, Handsome Giants and Blue Devils. Handsome Giants released their live DVD Live on Bow Street in 2005. In this same time span, he also contributed on the New Zealand Idol-winner Rosita Vai's solo album Golden.

In 2006, Aanerud joined the band of former Split Enz and Crowded House front man Tim Finn. This band also consisted of Brett Adams (guitar), Matt Eccles (drums) and Mareea Patterson (bass). Together with Tim Finn he toured New Zealand, Australia, Europe and the US, before returning to Norway in 2009. In New Zealand Aanerud is also known under the artist name Simen Taylor.

Back in Norway, Aanerud rejoined Amund Maarud in his solo project, and recorded his album Electric in 2001. This album won Spellemannsprisen in the Blues category. The following year saw the release of Amund's album Dirt, which was nominated for Spellemannsprisen in the Blues category.

In 2012 Aanerud officially founded his own company, Aanerud Industries. This is a company which makes interiors, lamps, toys, machines and other design items. The company has a workshop in Skogbygda. In December 2013 he was asked to do a talk at a Pecha Kucha-event in Oslo, about his creative process.

Simen released his first solo album Medicine in September 2014.

== Discography ==
=== MaarudKara ===
- First Blues (Tylden, 1999)

=== Darcy Perry ===
- blues4dad (RMA, 2002)
- Don't Hold Back (RMA, 2003)
- Heavy Rain (RMA, 2005)
- Phoenix (RMA, 2008)

=== Handsome Giants ===
- Live on Bow Street (Live DVD, 2002)

=== Various Artists ===
- Harmonica Masters of New Zealand (RMA, 2007)

=== Amund Maarud ===
- Electric (Snaxville Recordings, 2011)
- Dirt (Snaxville Recordings, 2012)

=== Simen Aanerud ===
- Medicine (Snaxville Recordings, 2014)
