= 1920 in Norwegian music =

The following is a list of notable events and releases of the year 1920 in Norwegian music.

== Births ==
January

- 11 – Ole Henrik Moe, pianist, art historian, and critic (died 2013).

February

- 15 – Rolf Andersen, trumpeter, orchestra conductor, and bandleader (died 2016).
- 16 — Karsten Andersen, orchestra conductor (died 1997).

August

- 3 – Jonas Brunvoll, Jr., operatic singer and actor (died 1982).
- 28 – Rowland Greenberg, trumpeter, vocalist, and bandleader (died 1994).

== See also ==
- 1920 in Norway
- Music of Norway
