= The Grand (band) =

Norwegian alternative rock band

- Origin: Oslo, Norway
- Genres: Alternative rock
- Years active: 2006–present
- Labels: The Grand Recordings; Sonet Records
- Members: Amund Maarud; Henrik Maarud; Per Tobro; Eirik Tovsrud Knutsen
- Website: http://www.thegrand.no/

The Grand is a Norwegian alternative rock band, formed in Oslo, Norway in 2006. The group consists of former blues guitar wunderkind and lead singer Amund Maarud, his younger brother Henrik Maarud on drums, bassist Per Tobro and keyboardist/percussionist Eirik Tovsrud Knutsen. The Grand gave their first performance in April 2007, before releasing their debut EP (The Grand Recordings/Sonet Records) the same month. Lead singer Amund Maarud is also starring in the forthcoming movie «Norwegian Ninja» (Kommandør Treholt og Ninjatroppen), due August 2010.

== History ==
=== Formation ===
By 2006, lead singer and guitarist Amund Maarud had already made a strong name for himself on the Norwegian blues scene, with the release of two albums (Ripped, Stripped and Southern Fried (2003) and Commotion (2004)) the first of which was nominated for the 2004 Norwegian Grammy Awards (Spellemannprisen). After a brief period where bassist Per Tobro and keyboardist Eirik Knutsen joined the Maarud-brothers as a traditional blues band, the group evolved into an alternative rock band, influenced by the early punk sounds of MC5 as well as the psychedelic sound of Cream and 13th Floor Elevators.

=== Debut EP ===
The Grand recorded their four-song debut EP during the first months of 2007, which was released on the group's own independent label, The Grand Recordings/Sonet Records, in April 2007. The EP was recorded and mixed in Athletic Sound Studio in Halden, Norway, engineered by Sven Olsen (Motorpsycho, Madgrugada etc.) and Kai Andersen. The song «Traveling Bound» from the EP was picked up and played extensively by Oslo's independent radio stations.

=== Self-titled album ===
The Grand's first full-length studio album was recorded in the Maarud-brothers own studio, Snaxville during the summer of 2007, and released on the Grand Recordings/Sonet Records label in October 2007. The self-titled album was produced by the group as a collective effort, and mixed and co-produced by Sven Olsen, who also engineered their debut EP. The album was met with excellent reviews by the Norwegian music press. The single «Lust to Win» was A-listed by nationwide pop music radio station NRK P3 for seven weeks, and B-listed for five weeks, and thus given extensive airplay. The Grand played several major Norwegian and European festivals during 2007, including the Øya-festival (Øyafestivalen) in Oslo and PopKomm in Berlin, as well as debarking on an extensive tour of the major Norwegian venues to promote the album. During 2008, The Grand also performed at Norway's Storåsfestivalen and Trænafestivalen, Denmark's Roskilde Festival and Holland's Eurosonic/Noorderslag, among others. In November and December 2008, The Grand's performance at the Crossroads Festival in Bonn, Germany was broadcast by the legendary TV-show Rockpalast on German TV-station WDR. The group was also scheduled to play the 2008 Quart Festival, another one of Norway's major music festivals, but the festival was cancelled due to bankruptcy the same year.

=== Second studio album ===
The Grand is currently working on their second studio album, due 2010.

== Discography ==
| Release date | Title | Label |
|---|---|---|
| April 2007 | EP | The Grand Recordings / Sonet Records |
| September 2007 | The Grand | The Grand Recordings / Sonet Records |
