= 1887 in Norwegian music =

The following is a list of notable events and releases of the year 1887 in Norwegian music.

== Deaths ==
May

- 7 – Alette Due, pianist and composer (born 1812).
- 23 – Ludvig Mathias Lindeman, composer and organist (born 1812).

== Births ==
April

- 3 – Edvard Bræin, organist, composer, and orchestra conductor (died 1957).

August

- 25 – Fartein Valen, composer (died 1952).

== See also ==
- 1887 in Norway
- Music of Norway
