= Panamah =

Danish electronic group

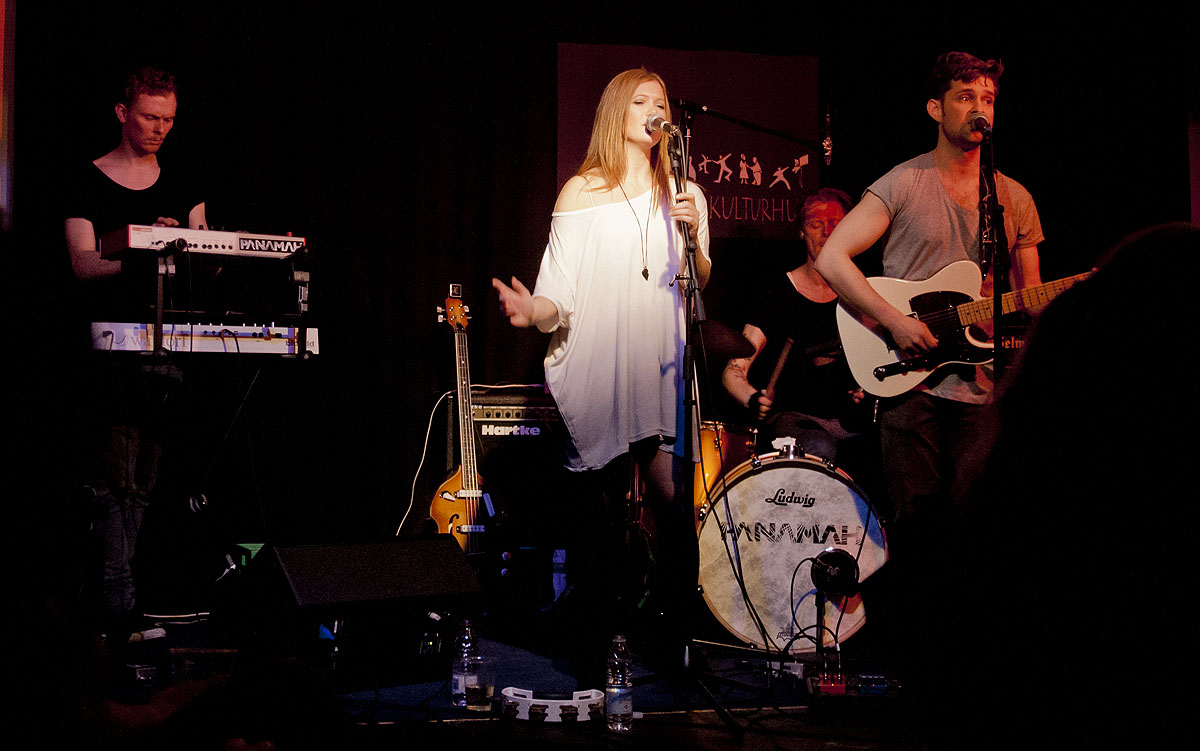

Background information
- Origin: Copenhagen, Denmark
- Genres: Electronica
- Years active: 2009-present
- Labels: Universal Music Group
- Members: Anders Christensen; Peter Lützen; Amalie Stender

Panamah is a Danish electronic group from Copenhagen made up of DJ producer Anders Christensen, guitarist Peter Lützen and lead singer Amalie Stender. The group's minimalist pop approach to electronic music has attracted attention particularly with their 2010 debut single "Ikke for sent", also remixed by Boom Clap Bachelors in April 2010. Influences include Junior Boys, Booka Shade, Bat For Lashes as well as Everything but the Girl, Kate Bush and Simon & Garfunkel. The band also released a successful single "DJ Blues"

== Discography ==
=== Albums ===
Year	Album	Peak Position	Certification
Year	Album	DAN	Certification
2011	Ud af stilhed	17	
2013	En varm nats kølige luft	4	

=== Singles ===
Year	Single	Peak Position	Certification	Album
Year	Single	DAN	Certification	Album
2010	"Ikke for sent"	10		Ud af stilhed
2012	"DJ Blues"	3		En varm nats kølige luft
2013	"Børn af natten"	1		En varm nats kølige luft
2013	"Små stød"	15		En varm nats kølige luft
2015	"Tag hvad du kan få"			
