= Shaka Ponk =

French electro rock band

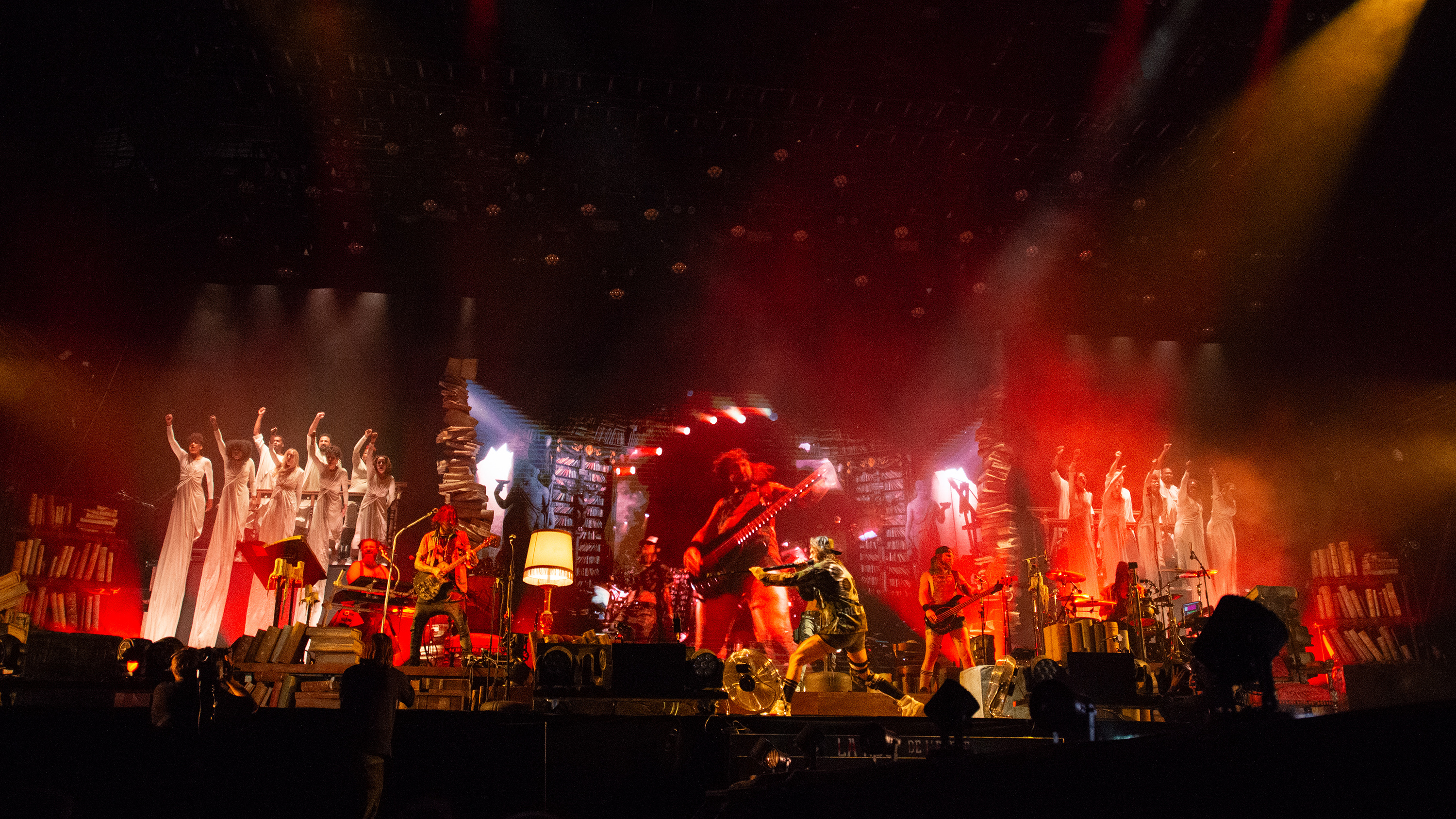
- Shaka Ponk performing in 2023

Background information
- Also known as: SHK PNK
- Origin: Paris, France
- Genres: Electronic rock; funk rock; hip-hop
- Years active: 2002–2024
- Label: Edel
- Members: François Charon; Cyril Roger; Steve Desgarceaux; Mandris Da Cruz; Yohan "Ion" Meunier; Samaha Sam
- Past members: Gaël Mesny; Matthias Pothier; Jean-Philippe Dumont
- Website: shakaponk.com

Shaka Ponk (sometimes abbreviated as SHKPNK) was a French musical band formed in Paris in 2002. They mix different forms of popular music into their songs in addition to world music, although predominantly with an electronic and experimental rock sound. Their lyrics are mostly in English, although they sometimes sing in French and Spanish.

In early 2022, Shaka Ponk announced that they would disband in 2024, after a final album and farewell tour, in order to focus on other musical projects.

== History ==
Shaka Ponk is a Paris-based band formed in 2002 that blends rock, electronic, punk rock, funk rock, and hip hop. They released their debut album, Loco Con Da Frenchy Talkin', in 2006, and followed up in 2009 with Bad Porn Movie Trax, spawning the singles "How We Kill Stars" and "Do".

In 2011, the band added a female vocalist, Samaha Sam, and released their third album, The Geeks and the Jerkin' Socks, in June.

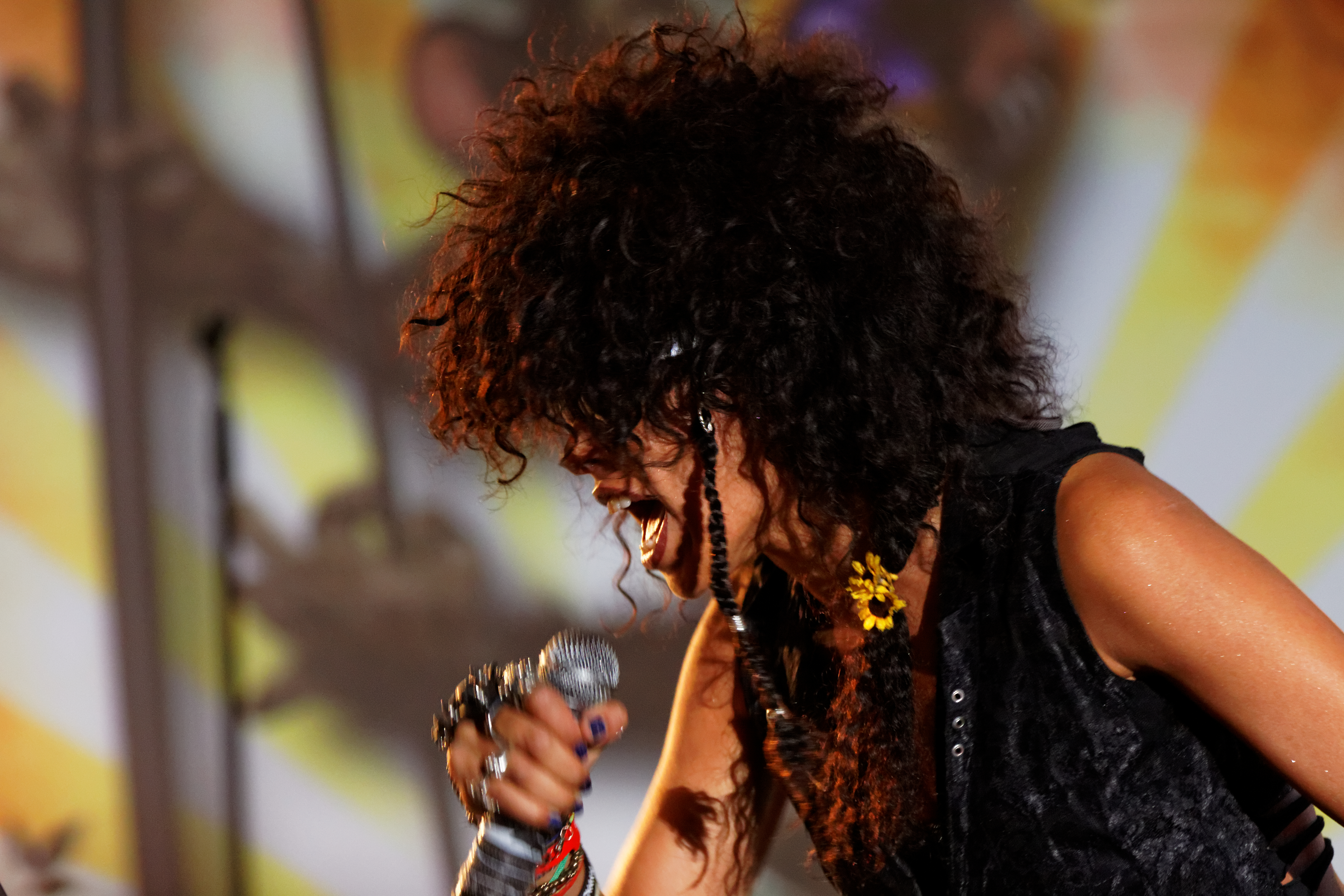
Shaka Ponk vocalist Samaha Sam at the Fête de l'Humanité in 2012

The band released two albums simultaneously in 2014, titled The White Pixel Ape (Smoking Isolate to Keep in Shape) and The Black Pixel Ape (Drinking Cigarettes to Take a Break). They issued The Evol' in 2017. Apelogies followed in 2020.

In early 2022, the band announced their upcoming disbandment due to Frah and Sam wanting to focus on the Freaks, a musical project dedicated to protecting the environment, which they formed in 2018. They released a final, self-titled album in 2023, and launched a farewell tour, the Final F#*cked Up Tour, which concluded in 2024.

== Band members ==
Past

- François "Frah" Charon – lead vocals (2002–2024)
- Cyril "C. C." Roger – guitars (2002–2024)
- Steve Desgarceaux – keyboards, samples (2007–2024)
- Mandris Da Cruz – bass (2007–2024)
- Yohan "Ion" Meunier – drums (2007–2024)
- Samaha Sam – lead vocals (2011–2024)
- Gaël "Mesn-X" Mesny – guitar (2002–2004)
- Matthias "Thias" Pothier – bass (2002–2007)
- Jean-Philippe "Bobee O.D" Dumont – drums (2002–2007)

== Discography ==
=== Studio albums ===
Year	Album	Charts		
Year	Album	FR	BEL (Wa)	SWI
2006	Loco Con Da Frenchy Talkin'	—	—	—
2009	Bad Porn Movie Trax	101	194	—
2011	The Geeks and the Jerkin' Socks	14	18	69
2014	The White Pixel Ape (Smoking Isolate to Keep in Shape)	2	10	16
2014	The Black Pixel Ape (Drinking Cigarettes to Take a Break)	4	39	54
2017	The Evol	6	31	25
2020	Apelogies	22	27	—
2023	Shaka Ponk	2	25	99

=== EPs ===
Year	Album	Charts
Year	Album	FR
2005	Hyppie Monkey EP	—
2017	ApeTizer EP	145

=== Reissues ===
Year	Album
2009	Loco Con Da Frenchy Talkin' (Recycled 2009)
2010	Bad Porn Movie Trax – 3rd edition (additional titles "Stop the Bot" and "French Touch Puta Madre (Live)")
2011	Sex, Plugs & Vidiot'Ape (included DVD: 70 minutes of Monkey TV mini-reportage about the band and music videos)
2012	The Geeks and the Jerkin' Socks – Deluxe Edition (with a DVD of Monkey TV mini-reportage about the band and music videos)

=== Live albums ===
Year	Album	Charts			Certification
Year	Album	FR	BEL (Wa)	SWI	Certification
2012	NRJ Sessions Shaka Ponk	144	—	—	
2013	Geeks on Stage	12	109	—	

=== Singles ===
Year	Single	Charts			Certification	Album
Year	Single	FR	BEL (Wa) (Ultratop)	BEL (Wa) (Ultratip*)	Certification	Album
2012	"My Name Is Stain"	7	11	–	Gold (Italy)	
2012	"Let's Bang"	55	–	16		
2012	"I'm Picky"	28	–	29		
2014	"Wanna Get Free"	45	–	18		
2014	"Scarify"	81	–	–		
2014	"Altered Native Soul"	98	–	–		
2014	"Story O' My LF"	132	–	–		
2017	"Wrong Side"	136	–	–		The Evol'

*Did not appear in the official Belgian Ultratop 50 charts, but rather in the bubbling-under Ultratip charts.
