= Trond Brænne =

Norwegian actor and writer, lyricist (1953–2013)

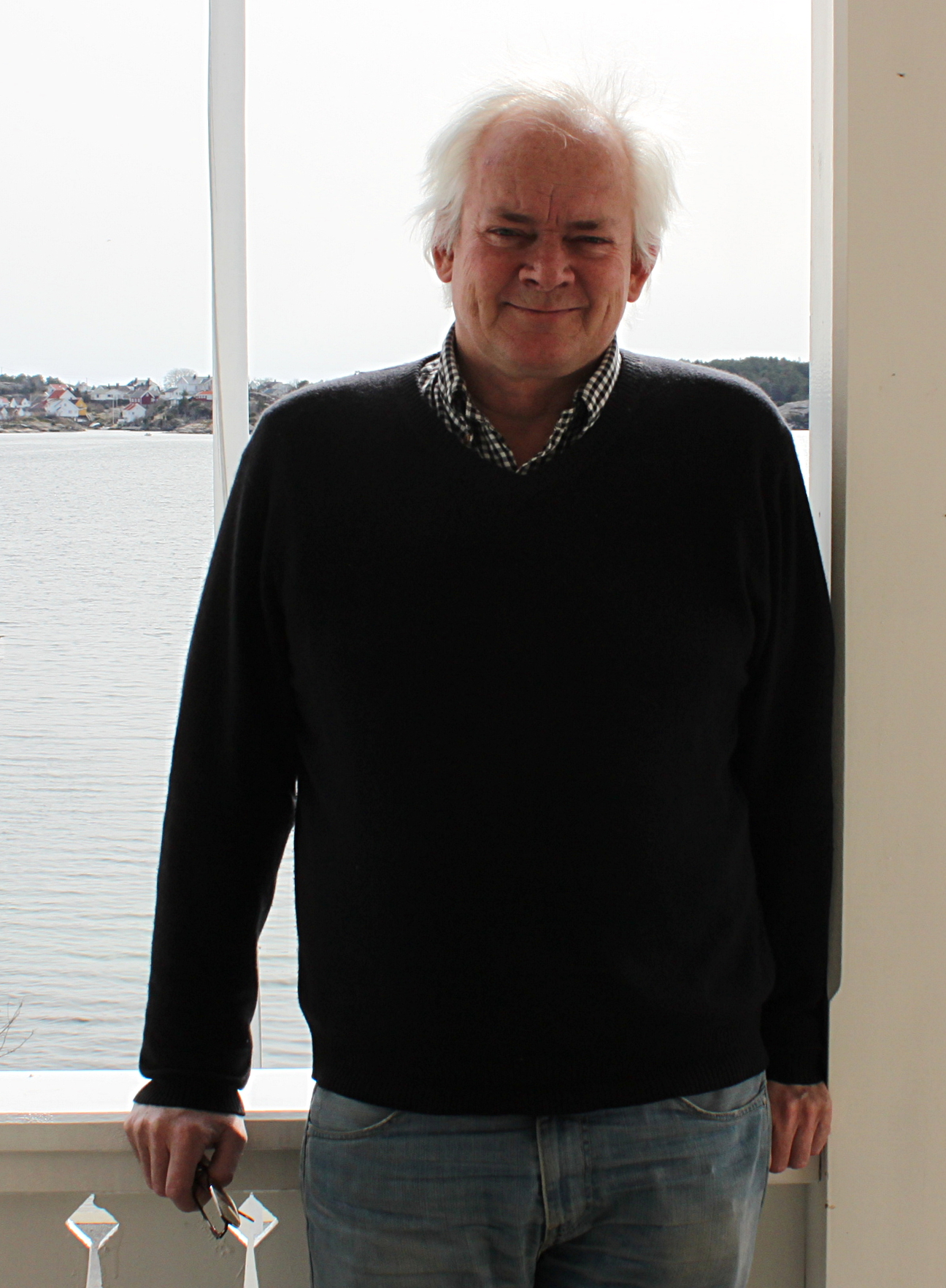
- Trond Brænne in Aust-Agder 2011. Credit: Grethe Tvede (AAbk)
- Born: 31 July 1953; Oslo, Norway
- Died: 16 March 2013 (aged 59); Oslo, Norway
- Occupations: Actor, author, radio and television personality

Trond Brænne (31 July 1953 – 16 March 2013) was a Norwegian actor, author and radio personality, best known for his many theater and television roles. He was also a decorated writer of children's songs and literature.

== Personal life ==
Brænne lived with fellow author Iben Sandemose. His son, Bendik Brænne, is a musician and author, and was, together with his father and with his sister, Kaia Brænne, nominated for the 2010 Brage Prize in the category children's literature.

In 1999, Brænne suffered a series of heart attacks, which required him to have a heart transplant, an event that affected him deeply. He nonetheless remained highly active, and returned to his normal work schedule soon.

On 15 March 2013 Brænne collapsed at work, having suffered a massive stroke caused by a rupture of the aorta. After almost 24 hours in critical condition, Brænne died the following day, three and a half months short of his 60th birthday. He is survived by partner Iben Sandemose and his three children.

== Selected works ==
- Bestefar er en rev
- Burgerkrim
- Dundøden
- Fru Andersen har hump i halen
- Revedrepere
- Rottene kommer
- Vi bare gjør det
- Vi gir oss ikke
- Vidundermiksturen
- Uvenner
- Mareritt i Casa Bianca
