= Henrik Maarud =

Norwegian drummer (born 1983)

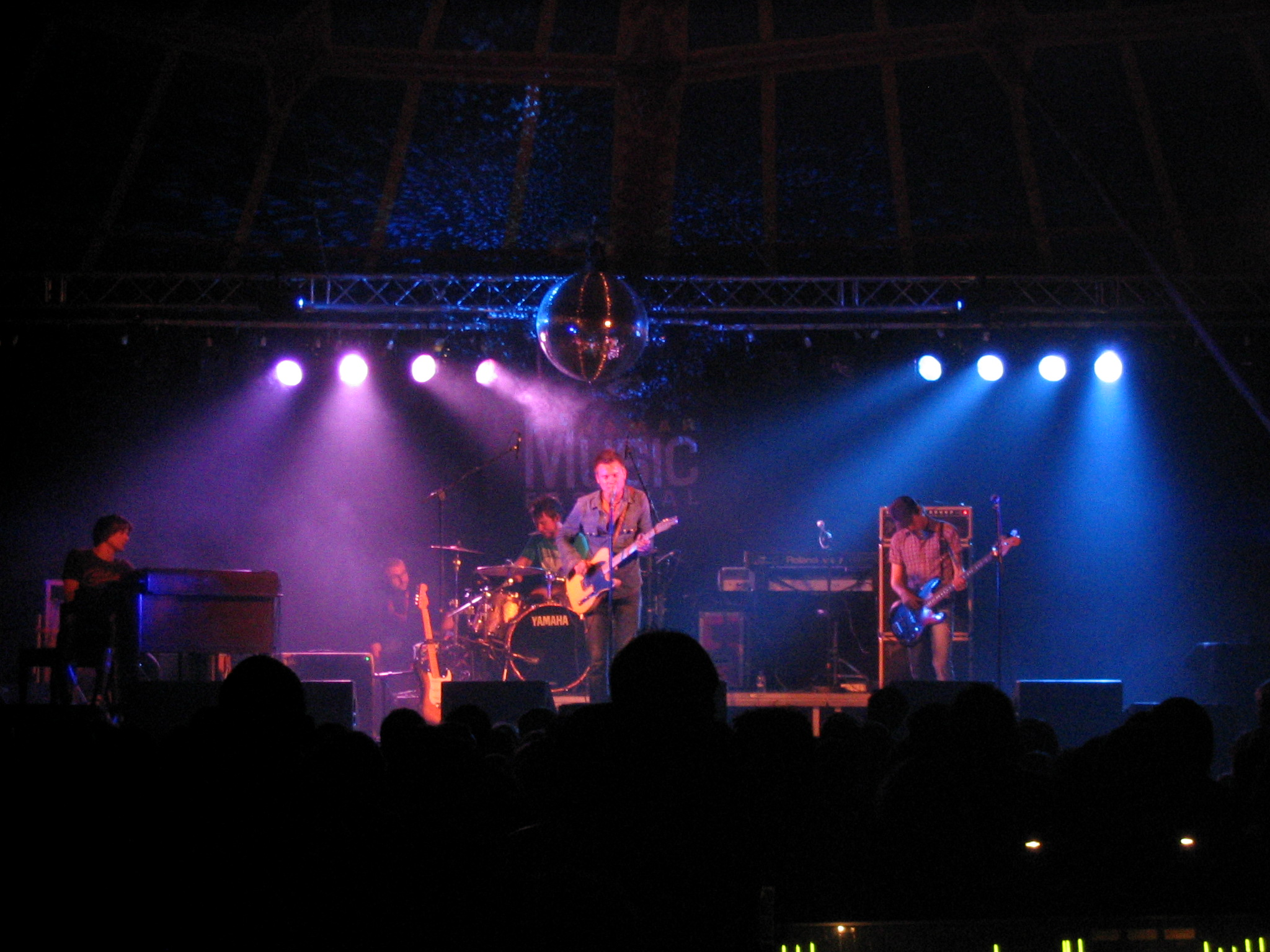
- Henrik Maarud (central in the back) with Amund Maarud Band during the "Hamar Musikkfestival". (Photo: Thomas Andersen, 2004)

Background information
- Born: 4 April 1983 (age 43); Nes, Akershus, Norway
- Origin: Norway
- Genres: Rock music
- Occupations: Musician, sound engineering, music producer, composer
- Instruments: Drums, vocals
- Labels: Tylden & Co
- Website: Henrik Maarud on Myspace

Henrik Maarud (born 4 April 1983 in Nes, Norway) is a Norwegian drummer. He plays in the blues rock band The Grand together with his older brother, the guitarist and vocalist Amund Maarud.

== Career ==
Together with his brother Amund, he started the 'MaarudKara' as a four-year-old, where their father was backing on bass in addition to the Simen Aanerud (known as Simon Taylor) on piano. Initially the repertoire consisted of pop music, but eventually they converted to blues music. The band was second in "Talentiaden" at NRK in 1997, and released the album First Blues (1999). In 2000 Amund focused on solo career with Henry as the drummer within the 'Amund Maarud Band'. They released the album Ripped, Stripped and Southern Fried (2003), and was nominated for Spellemannprisen 2003, in the category Blues.

During this period, 'Amund Maarud Band' regular house orchestra at the blues club Muddy Waters in Oslo and backed Norwegian and international artists like R.C Finnegan, Vidar Busk, Paal Flaata, Barbara Blue, Larry Burton, Earl Poolbal, Hal Ketchum, Brian Setzer, Mason Ruffner, Linda Gail Lewis, Claudia Scott and Glenn D. Hardin hundreds of concerts and jam nights.

In 2004 the 'Amund Maarud Band' released the album Commotion, and signaled a change of style in the band. Per Tobro replaced Bill Troiani on the bass, and Eirik Tovsrud Knutsen joined at the organ during this tour. In 2006 the brothers together with the rest of the band started The Grand playing more rock music. The Grand released an EP and an album by the same name The Grand (2006), and attended the Roskilde Festival in Denmark and live on the TV program Rockpalazt in Germany (2008).

He is also music producer and sound engineer at Snaxville Studio, which he owns with his brother, and has participated as a technician on recordings with, among others, The Respatexans (Shine On who won the Spellemannprisen in 2005), Kid Andersen (Greaseland in 2006), Ottar "Big Hand" Johansen (Drømmeland in 2006), Jens Andreas Kleiven (Moments in 2008) and Bill Troiani (Love Sickness in 2009).

Together with the bassist Per Tobro from 'The Grand' among others, he also played in the rock band MF-35 during the period 2005–09. When 'The Grand' took a break in 2010, he has been busy duo Morudes which also includes his brother on guitar.

== Discography ==
Within "MaarudKara»

- 1999: First Blues (Tylden & Co)

With Amund Maarud Band

- 2003: Ripped, Stripped & Southernfried (Blue Mood/BMG)
- 2004: Commotion (BMG)

Within "The Respatexans»

- 2005: Shine On (Bare Bra Musikk)

With Mona Grytøyr

- 2006: From Here to Paradise (Asap Media)

With Ottar "Big Hand" Johansen

- 2006: Drømmeland (New Cut Music)

With Gaute Ormåsen

- 2006: G For Gaute (Tylden & Co)

Within The Grand

- 2007: The Grand (The Grand Recordings/Sonet)

With Julie Willumsen

- 2010: Waltz for Valentines (MamaSaySing)

With Dave Herrero

* 2012: Corazón (Hero Music Group)

With Amund Maarud

- 2011: Electric (Snaxville Recordings)
- 2012: Dirt (Snaxville Recordings)
