= Halvor Haug =

Norwegian composer (1952–2025)

Halvor Haug (20 February 1952 – 3 June 2025) was a Norwegian composer whose music has been performed internationally and widely recorded. He composed large scale orchestral works - including five symphonies - and chamber music.

== Life and career ==
Born in Trondheim, Haug studied with Kolbjørn Ofstad at the Oslo Conservatory, and from 1973 spent a year at the Sibelius Academy in Helsinki, where he studied with Einar Englund and Erik Bergman. While in London he took lessons from Robert Simpson. He was the first Norwegian festival composer chosen for the Stavanger Chamber Music Festival in 1996.

He first made a mark as a composer with orchestral works scored with "an almost Romantic fullness, and with clear form and polyphonic lines...colourful and rhythmically varied within a moderate modern musical language". These include the early Symphonic Picture (1976, still his best known work), the Symphonic Contours (1977), Silence for Strings (1997) and the first two Symphonies (1982, 1984). Haug described himself as a "modern romantic".

The later Symphony No. 3 (1994) is tightly organized around a simple cell of four notes, and includes at the end the song of a Nightingale played on tape. Later works, including Insignia for chamber orchestra (commissioned from the Lillehammer Olympics in 1994), the Piano Trio (1995) and the String Quartet No. 1 (1996) are more dissonant and experimental.

Haug lived at Harestua. He died on 3 June 2025, at the age of 73.

== Selected works ==
- Violin Sonata (1973)
- Tre "Utfall" for guitar (1973/74)
- Symphonic Picture (1976)
- Silence for strings (1977)
- Symphonic Contours (1977)
- Impression for Piano Solo (1980)
- Poema Sonoro (1980)
- Poema Patetico (1980)
- Symphony No. 1 (1981/82)
- Cordiale (1982), symphonic band
- Symphony No. 2 (1984)
- Human Dignity and Peace (1985), symphonic epics
- Exit for band (1985)
- String Quartet No. 1 (1985)
- Never Forget Her (1985), song cycle for mezzo-soprano and orchestra
- Essay for alto trombone and string quartet (1986)
- Furunes sang (Song of the Pines, 1987)
- Insignia (1993)
- Symphony No. 3 The Inscrutable Life (1994)
- Piano Trio (1995)
- String Quartet No. 2 (1996)
- Il Preludio dell' Ignoto (2000)
- Symphony No. 4 (2001)
- Symphony No. 5 (2002)
