= Grand Island (band) =

Norwegian band

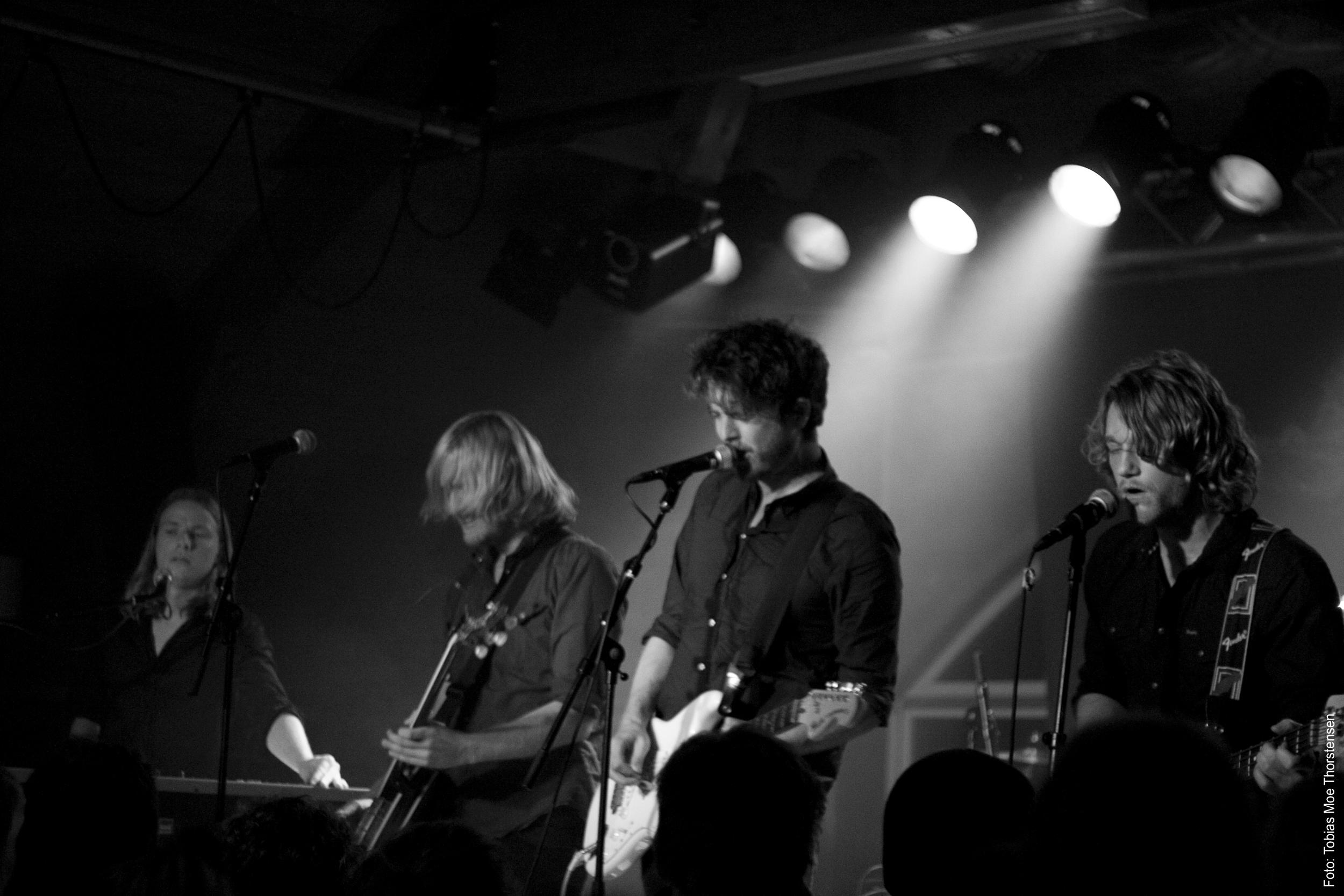

Background information
- Origin: Oslo, Norway
- Genres: Rock; Alternative rock Soul
- Years active: 2006-present
- Label: Racing Junior
- Members: Eirik Iversen; Nils Brodersen; Jon Iver Helgaker; Espen Gustavsen; Pål Gustavsen
- Past members: Inge Kristian Brodersen

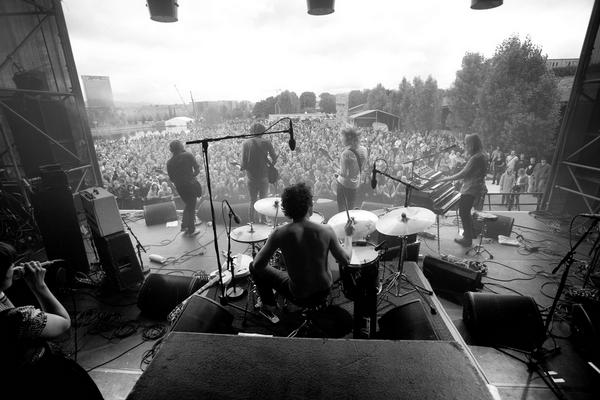
Grand Island live at Øyafestivalen

Grand Island is a Norwegian band. The band was formed in Oslo in 2004, with members from Moss, Sørumsand, and Oslo. They released their first album Say No To Sin in 2006. The band themselves refer to their music as 'southern indie'.

Say No To Sin was well received in Norway and appeared on many lists of the best albums in 2006. It had a broader European release in 2007, receiving many favourable reviews. The song "Us Annexed" was awarded best song of 2006 by Musikknyheter.

Grand Island released their second album Boys and Brutes in Spring 2008. The album was nominated for a Spellemann award for best rock-album.

Songs From Östra Knoll 1:22 was released in 2010 and contained the songs "Angelila" and "Suffer (Lid, min kjære)", the latter with Janove Ottesen from Kaizers Orchestra on guest vocals.

In 2013 came the album Della Loved Steve, which contains the band's most streamed song, "Oh, You Know Me Well".

The band was nominated for both the Spellemann Award 2006 and the Alarmprisen 2007 in the category best music video for "Us Annexed", directed by Axel Hennie.

The music video for "Love in Decay" won the Music Video Award at the Short Film Festival in Grimstad.

The band has played at both SXSW and Eurosonic.

Vocalist and guitarist Espen Gustavsen also plays in the band "Johnny Cane Band" with Terje Krumins of fellow Norwegian band Superfamily.

== Members ==
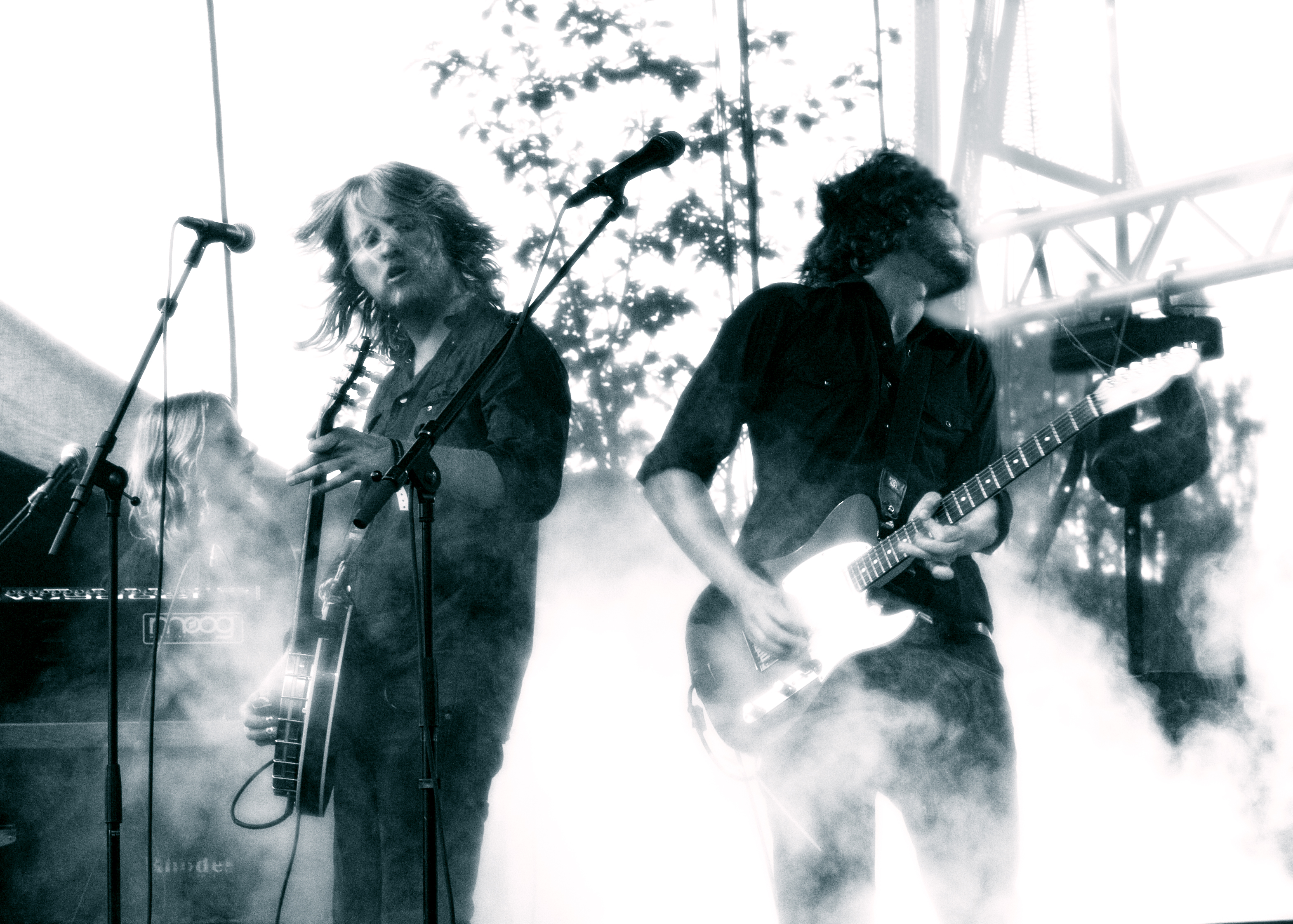
Live at Kartfestivalen

- Eirik Iversen - Bass
- Inge Brodersen - Bass (2004–2008)
- Nils Brodersen - Drums / Perc
- Jon Iver Helgaker - Keys / Vocals
- Espen Gustavsen- Vocals / Guitar
- Pål Gustavsen - Banjo / Guitar / Vocals

== Discography ==
Say No To Sin

This is the band's debut album, released by Grand Island in August 2006. The album contains the song "Us Annexed", which received a Spellemann Award for best music video, directed by Aksel Hennie. Grand Island recorded the album in Athletic Studios in Halden, Norway, and the album was mixed in Los Angeles by Steven McDonald and Ken Sluiter.

Boys & Brutes

This is the band's second album, released in Spring 2008.

Songs From Östra Knoll 1.22

This is the band's third album, released in 2010. The album contains the hit-single Suffer (Lid, Min Kjære) with Janove Ottesen from Kaizers Orchestra on guest vocals.

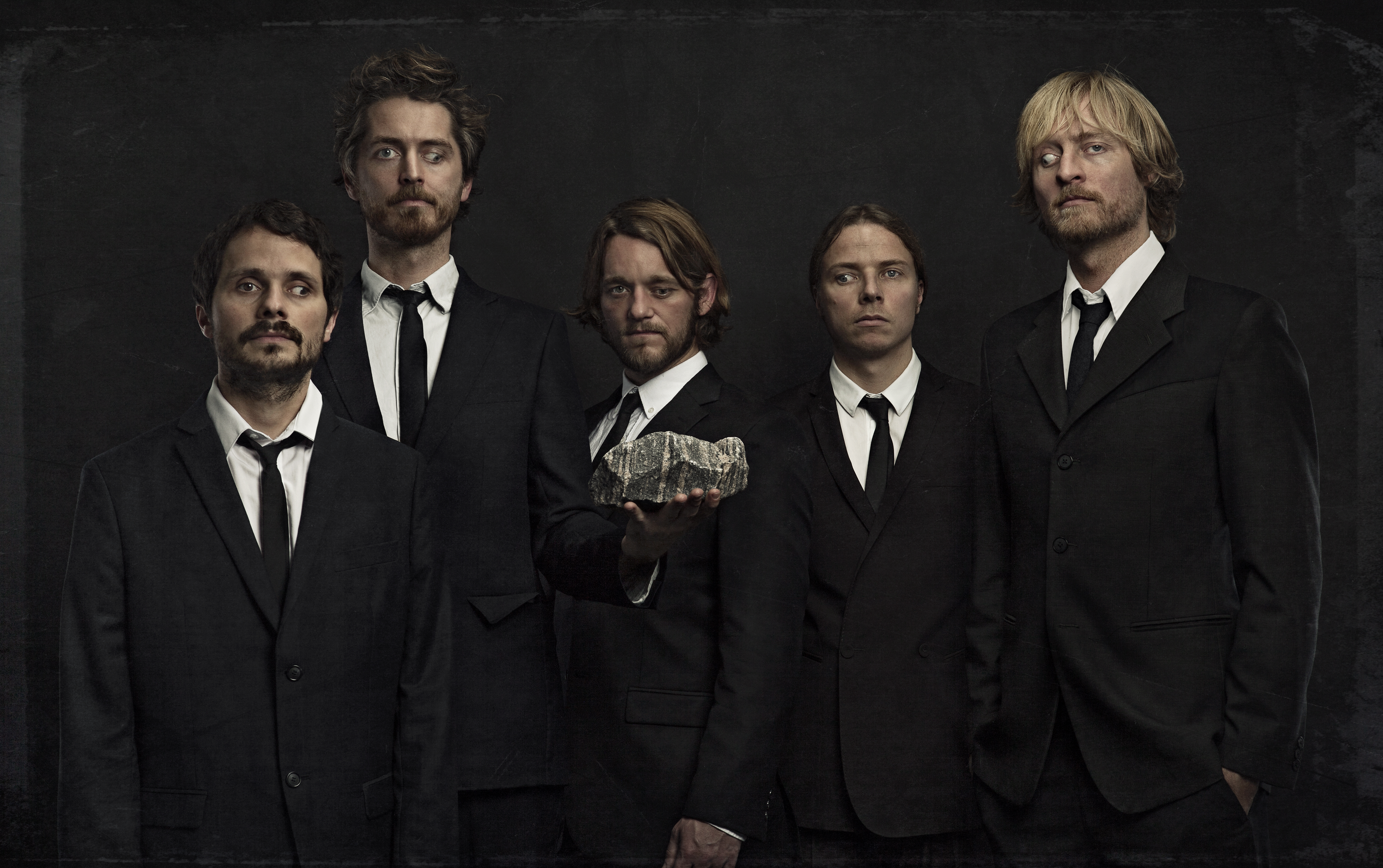

Della Loved Steve

This is the band's fourth album, released on March 15, 2013.

Original Score For The Film An Arctic Space Odyssey

Released January 2014

Young Hawk & I

Released in 2019
