= Admiral P =

Norwegian reggae singer

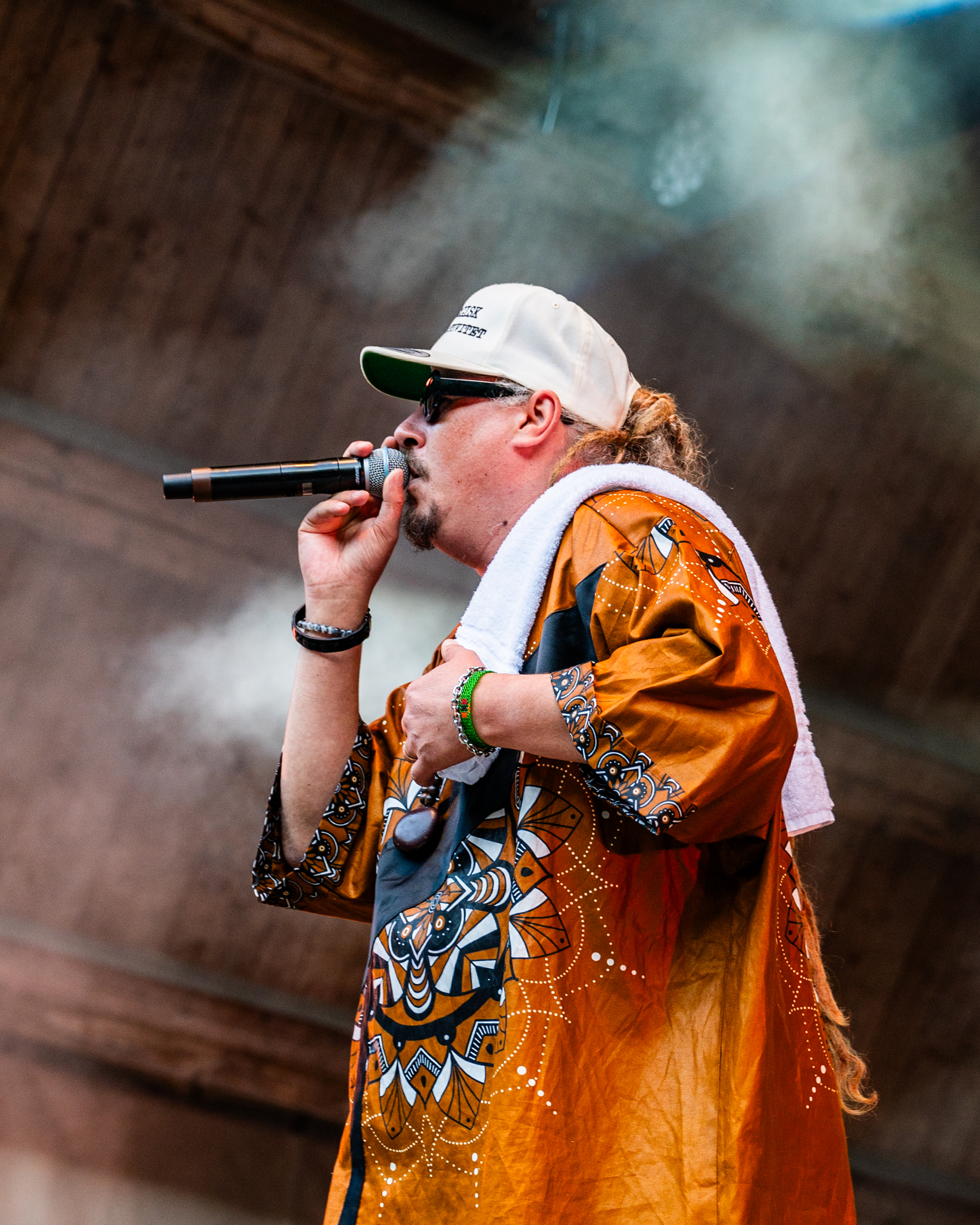

Background information
- Born: Philip Boardman; 27 March 1982 (age 44); Zambia
- Origin: Norwegian-Zambian
- Genres: Reggae, alternative hip hop
- Occupations: Singer, songwriter
- Years active: 2008 – present
- Formerly of: Jah Ark Manifest (JAM)
- Website: Admiral P

Philip Boardman (born 27 March 1982), known by his stage name Admiral P, is a Norwegian reggae artist. He is best known for his commercial breakthrough single "Snakke litt" (2011), which reached No. 4 on the VG-lista singles chart. His 2012 single "Kallenavn" reached No. 2 in Norway and also received airplay in Sweden, which is unusual for Norwegian language records.

== Early life and career ==
Boardman was born in Lusaka, Zambia to a Zambian mother and his Norwegian father Tom Boardman, and grew up with the street culture and music of the less privileged neighbourhoods. He regards Nyanja as his first language, Norwegian and English as second languages.

At the age of 10 he attended a Shabba Ranks concert, which he has cited as a large influence in the decision to become a reggae artist.

In 1995, when he was 13, his family moved to Oslo, Norway because his father was terminally ill and they reasoned that he would receive better healthcare in Norway. However, shortly after the move, his father died. In an episode of the TV 2 musical reality show "Cover Me" he admitted that adapting to Norwegian culture and society was challenging."

However, as he grew older he hooked up with fellow reggae enthusiasts such as Selecta "Lion" Daniel and long-standing partner Nico D, and in 1999 they formed the Reggae/Dance Hall collective Jah Ark Manifest (JAM). JAM played numerous gigs in Oslo in the early 2000s, and also supported several internationally recognized reggae acts such as The Wailers, Steel Pulse and Wayne Wonder at their Oslo shows.

== Breakthrough ==
In 2008 the mixtape "Muzical Bullit – The Admiral Story" was released and distributed on concerts, and in some independent music stores. It was co-produced with Nico D and featured more established artists such as rappers KaSimba (Alias Ras Steven, previous member of the Norwegian rap group Paperboys), OnklP (of the now defunct Lillehammer-based rap collective Dirty Oppland), El Axel, and pop/soul singer Mira Craig.

The next release, "To the World" (2009) was a collaboration between Nico D and Admiral P, and was JAMs first album release. The single "Spinnvill" (which translates to "wild" or "crazy") sung by Admiral P became a major YouTube hit and brought him to the attention of commercial media, thus securing him nationwide gigs.

2011 saw Admiral P's first solo release, the "Jobber overtid" ("Working overtime") EP. "Snakke litt" ("Talk a little") was released as the first single, and became his commercial breakthrough, climbing to No. 4 on the VG-Lista topp 20 single chart and securing him a nomination for best hit song at the 2011 Spellemannsprisen national music awards. "Gjør så godt du kan" ("Do as best you can") also received airplay.

2012 saw the release of one single, "Kallenavn" ("Nicknames"), his most successful single to date, reaching No. 2 on VG-lista topp 20 and also receiving significant airplay on Swedish radio, which is uncommon for a Norwegian language song. "Kallenavn" later appeared on his 2014 album Selvtillit & tro.

Admiral P currently lives in the town of Askim, Østfold with his wife and children.

== Musical style and lyrics ==
Admiral P's music is characterized by reggae beats and Norwegian lyrics. In response to the question of why he chooses to make reggae songs in Norwegian, he has stated that it is something that Norwegians need, and that he wanted to prove that it was possible – hoping to inspire others to do the same thing.

The lyrics often carry a positive message, often being expressions of love (e.g. "Spinnvill" and "Kallenavn"), or encouraging the listener ("Gjør så godt du kan"). The beats are created electronically and he is not seen playing instruments. In concert he is usually accompanied by a DJ and a few female backing vocalists.

In the 10 November 2012 episode of the musical reality TV show "Cover Me" he was tasked with creating a new version of the 1980 Norwegian hit "Livet er for kjipt" ("Life is too bad") by Lars Kilevold. The song originally combines a reggae beat with depressive lyrics. Admiral P chose to write new, positive lyrics for it, and renamed it "Livet er så sweet" ("Life is so sweet").

== Discography ==
=== Albums ===
- 2008: Muzikal Bullit – The Admiral Story (Mixtape)
- 2009: To The World (with Nico D)
- 2014: Selvtillit & tro

=== EPs ===
- 2011: Jobber overtid

=== Singles ===
| Year | Single | Peak position | Certifications | Album |
| Year | Single | NOR | Certifications | Album |
|---|---|---|---|---|
| 2011 | "Snakke litt" | 4 | | "Jobbe Overtid" (EP) |
| 2012 | "Kallenavn" | 2 | | |
| 2014 | "Engel" | 1 | | |
