= Amund Maarud =

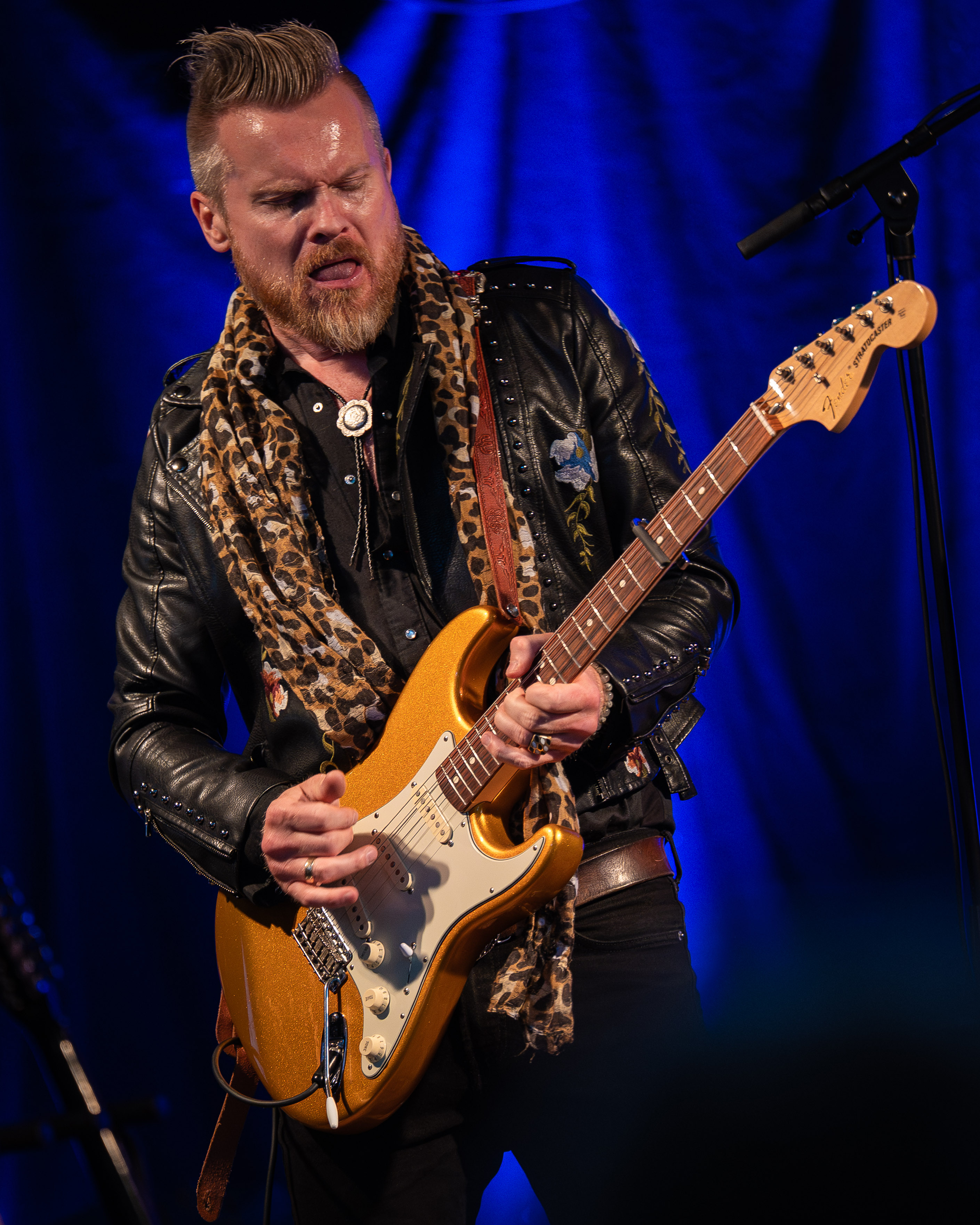
- Maarud at the 2023 Kongsberg Jazzfestival.

Background information
- Born: 7 April 1981 (age 45); Nes, Akershus, Norway
- Origin: Norway
- Genres: Blues, rock music
- Occupations: Musician, composer
- Instruments: Guitar, vocals
- Labels: Blue Mood; The Grand recordings Snaxville Recordings
- Website: www.amundmaarud.no

Amund Maarud (born 7 April 1981 in Nes, Akershus, Norway) is a Norwegian blues/rock musician (guitar, vocals) and composer.

Maarud is known both as a solo artist and as the frontman of the rock band The Grand (2005–2010), as well as several other projects, including the duo Morudes (2010–), which he formed with his brother, drummer Henrik Maarud. He is also the co-owner of Snaxville Studio, a recording facility.

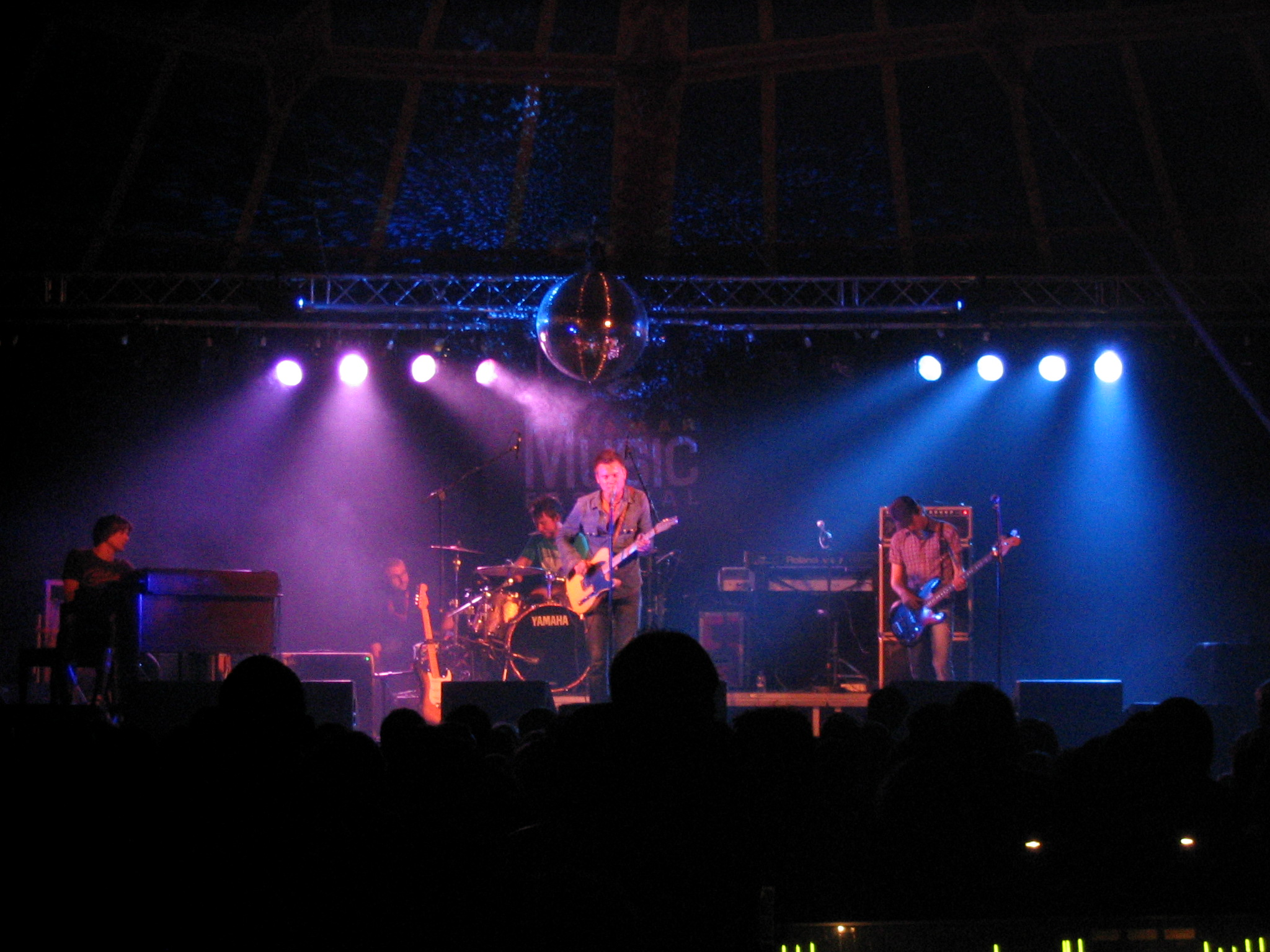
Amund Maarud (central) with his own Amund Maarud Band during the «Hamar Musikkfestival» 2004. (Photo: Thomas Andersen)

== Career ==
Maarud is widely regarded as one of Norway’s leading blues guitarists. He has toured both nationally and internationally with various bands, earning acclaim from audiences and the press alike. His live performances are frequently described as powerful shows that blend elements of blues, rock, and psychedelia.

Together with his brother Henrik Maarud (drums), he formed the band MaarudKara at the age of six. The group placed second in Talentiaden (1997) on NRK and released the album First Blues the following year. In 2000, he began his solo career, performing with his backing group A. M. Band, which also featured his brother on drums and maintained a blues-oriented repertoire. The band released two albums, Ripped, Stripped & Southern Fried (2003) and Commotion (2004), and received a Spellemannprisen nomination in 2003 in the Blues/Country category for their debut album.

In 2006, he founded The Grand, featuring the same lineup as A. M. Band but with a more rock-oriented and psychedelic sound. The band released their self-titled album The Grand in 2007. Since 2010, the group is on hiatus for an indefinite period.

Together with his drummer brother, he formed the duo Morudes in 2010.

Around the turn of 2010/2011, he launched a new solo project under his own name, featuring a musical style more closely rooted in traditional guitar blues. His live band included his brother on drums, Simen Aanerud on piano, and Bendik Brænne on baritone saxophone. While both bands shared similar origins, they differed in their musical expression. For his first solo album, Electric, he received Spellemannprisen 2011 in the Blues category. It was followed by two additional albums, Dirt (2012) and Volt (2015), forming a trilogy of rock influenced releases.

Alongside Lars Horntveth and Gard Nilssen, he founded the jazz/blues/rock fusion trio Amgala Temple. They released an album, Invisible Airships, in 2018. The same year, he started an Americana influenced collaboration with Malin Pettersen's band Lucky Lips, which has resulted in two albums; Perfect Strangers (2018) and Wolves (2022).

=== Maarud as an actor ===
Maarud debuted as an actor in the film Kommandør Treholt og Ninjatroppen that premiered in August 2010.

== Awards and nominations ==
- 2003: Spellemannprisen nomination in the blues/country category for Ripped, Stripped & Southern Fried
- 2011: Spellemannprisen win in the blues category for the solo album Electric
- 2012: Spellemannprisen nomination in the blues category for the solo album Dirt
- 2015: Spellemannprisen nomination in the rock category for the solo album Volt
- 2016: Tono's Edvard-prisen in the popular music category
- 2016: Bluesprisen, Notodden Blues Festival
- 2018: His own star at the Blues Walk of Fame, Notodden
- 2018: Spellemannprisen nomination in the open category for Invisible Airships with Amgala Temple

== Discography ==
=== Solo albums ===
- 2011: Electric (Snaxville Recordings/Musikkoperatørene)
- 2012: Dirt (Snaxville Recordings/Musikkoperatørene)
- 2015: Volt (Snaxville Recordings/Musikkoperatørene)

=== Collaborative works ===
==== Within MaarudKara ====
- 1999: First Blues (Tylden)

==== With Amund Maarud Band ====
- 2003: Ripped, Stripped & Southernfried (Blue Mood/BMG)
- 2004: Commotion (BMG)

==== Within The Grand ====
- 2007: The Grand (The Grand Recordings/Sonet)

==== Within Amgala Temple ====
- 2018: Invisible Airships (Pekula Records)
- 2018: «Avenue Amgala» – single (Pekula Records)

==== With Lucky Lips ====
- 2018: Perfect Strangers (Snaxville Recordings)
- 2022: Wolves (Snaxville Recordings)

== Lineups in bands or backing bands ==
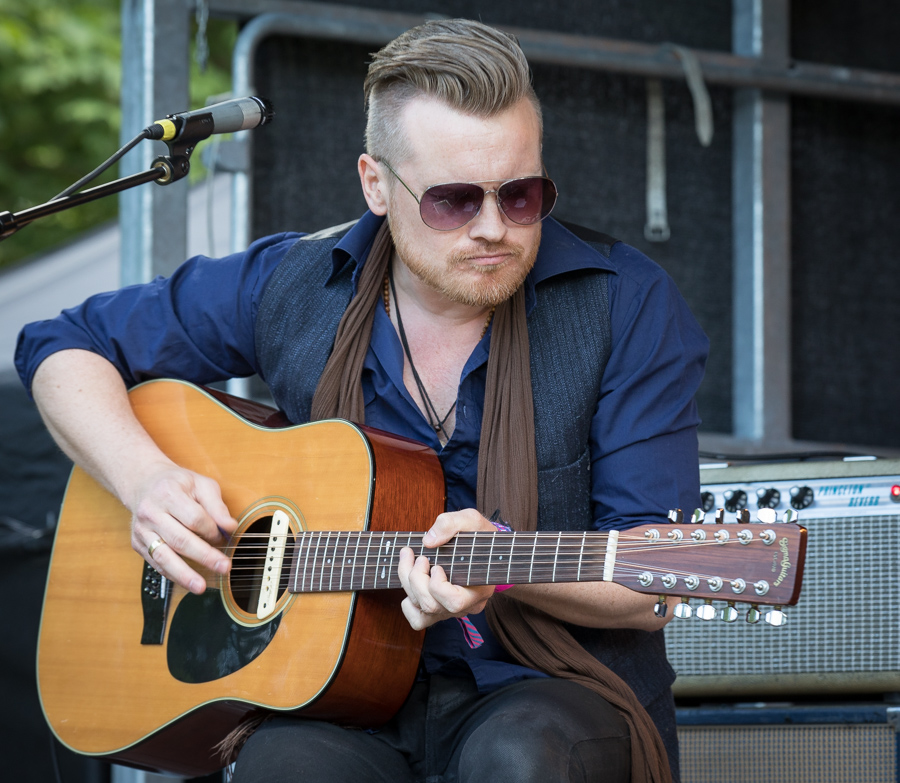
Amund Maarud performing in 2017

=== Members of Amund Maarud Band (2000–2005) ===
- Amund Maarud – guitar & vocals
- Henrik Maarud – drums
- Jan Eirik Hallingskog – bass (2000–2002)
- Arne F. Rasmussen – harmonica (2000–2002)
- Bill Troiani – bass guitar (−2003)
- Håkon Høye – guitar (2003–2004)
- Per Tobro – bass (2004–)
- Eirik Tovsrud Knutsen – keyboards (2004–)

=== Members of The Grand (2005–2010) ===
- Amund Maarud – guitar & vocals
- Henrik Maarud – drums
- Per Tobro – bass
- Eirik Tovsrud Knudsen – Hammond B3 organ

=== Members of Morudes (2010–) ===
- Amund Maarud – guitar & vocals
- Henrik Maarud – drums & vocals

=== Backingband Amund Maarud (2010–) ===
- Amund Maarud – guitar & vocals
- Henrik Maarud – drums & vocals
- Egil Stemkens – bass
- Simen Aanerud – piano
- Bendik Brænne – baryton saxophone

=== Members of Amund Maarud trio (2023–) ===
- Amund Maarud – guitar & vocals
- Vegard Staum – drums
- Kim André Tønnesen – bass

| Preceded by Billy T Band | Recipient of the Blues Spellemannprisen; 2011 | Succeeded by Billy T Band |
| Preceded by Jarle Bernhoft | Recipient of the popular music Edvardprisen; 2016 | Succeeded by Marit Larsen |
