= Kaizers Orchestra discography =

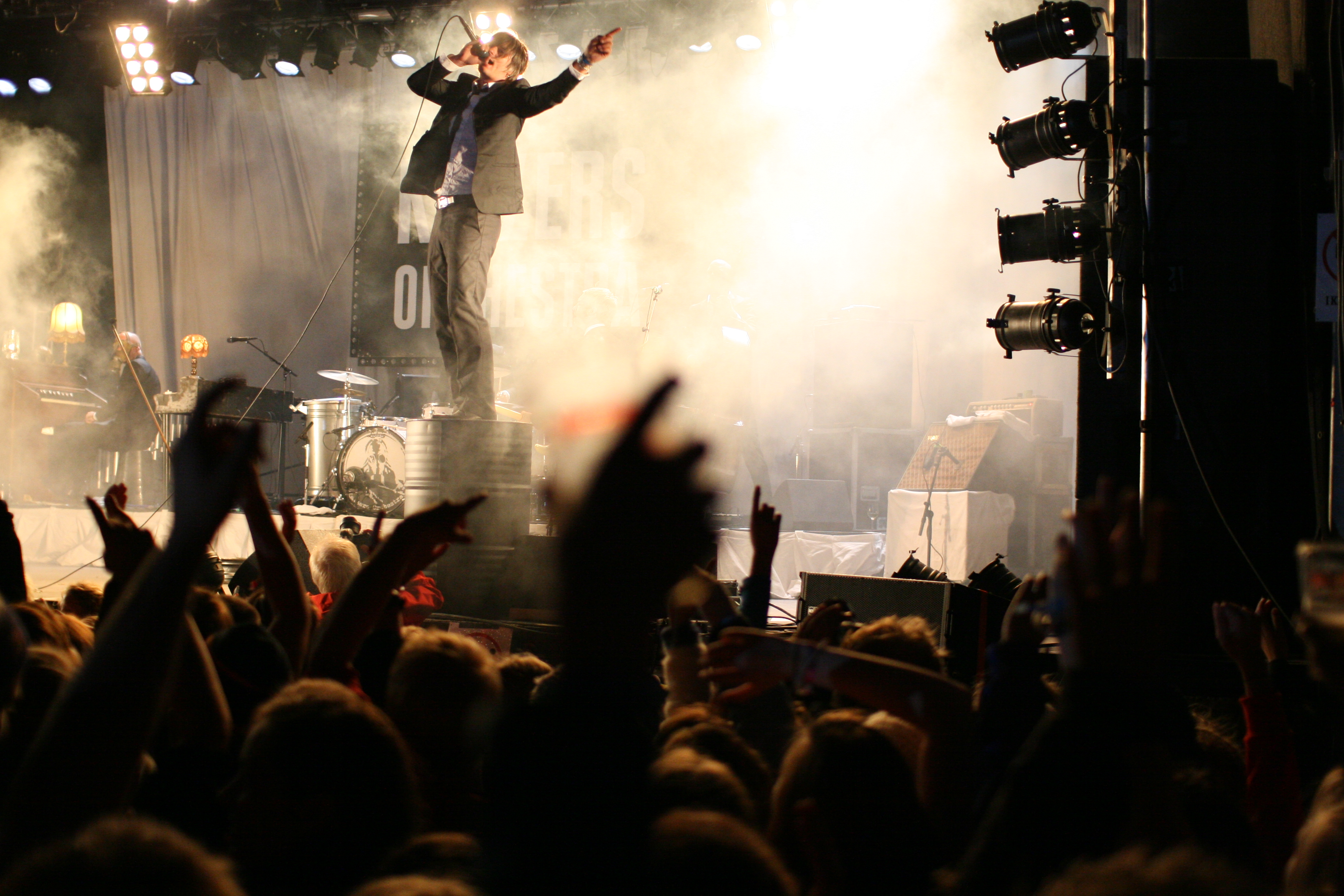
- Kaizers Orchestra performing in 2008
- Studio albums: 8
- EPs: 6
- Live albums: 3
- Compilation albums: 1
- Video albums: 4
- Music videos: 11
- Singles: 18

The discography of the Norwegian alternative rock band Kaizers Orchestra consists of eighth studio albums, one compilation album, three live albums, six EPs and eighteen singles.

== Albums ==
=== Studio albums ===
| Title | Album details | Peak chart positions | | | Sales |
| Title | Album details | DEN | NOR | SWE | Sales |
|---|---|---|---|---|---|
| Ompa til du dør | Released: 1 September 2001; Label: Broiler Farm; Format: CD | 22 | 1 | — | Worldwide: 100,000 |
| Evig pint | Released: 3 February 2003; Label: BroilerFarm; Format: CD | 30 | 1 | — | |
| Maestro | Released: 15 August 2005; Label: Kaizerecords, Universal; Format: CD | 3 | 1 | — | |
| Maskineri | Released: 18 February 2008; Label: Petroleum Records, Sony BMG; Format: CD | 9 | 1 | — | |
| Våre demoner | Released: 27 April 2009; Label: Sony Music Entertainment; Format: CD | — | 1 | — | |
| Violeta Violeta Vol. I | Released: 31 January 2011; Label: Petroleum Records; Format: CD | 20 | 1 | 45 | |
| Violeta Violeta Vol. II | Released: 11 November 2011; Label: Petroleum Records; Format: CD | 21 | 1 | — | |
| Violeta Violeta Vol. III | Released: 2 November 2012; Label: Petroleum Records; Format: CD | — | 1 | — | |

=== Compilation albums ===
| Title | Album details | Peak chart positions | Sales | Certifications |
| Title | Album details | NOR | Sales | Certifications |
|---|---|---|---|---|
| Greatest Hits | Released: 25 November 2022; Label: Petroleum Records; Format: LP | 1 | Worldwide: | NOR: |

=== Live albums ===
| Title | Album details | Peak chart positions | Sales | Certifications |
| Title | Album details | NOR | Sales | Certifications |
|---|---|---|---|---|
| Live at Vega | Released: 6 March 2006; Label: Kaizerecords, Virgin; Format: CD | 8 | Worldwide: | NOR: |
| 250 prosent | Released: 7 October 2008; Label: Sony BMG; Format: LP, digital download | — | Worldwide: | NOR: |
| Live i Oslo Spektrum | Released: 11 November 2011; Label: Kaizerecords; Format: CD, DVD | — | Worldwide: | NOR: |

== Extended plays ==
=== EPs ===
| Title | Details |
|---|---|
| Kaizers Orchestra EP aka Gul EP | Released: 2000, digitally re-released 2022; Label: Tom Rasmussen Produksjoner; Format: CD |
| Mann mot mann | Released: 2002; Label: Broiler Farm; Format: CD, digital download |
| Død manns tango | Released: 2002; Label: Broiler Farm; Format: CD, digital download |
| The Gypsy Finale | Released: 2004; Label: Format: CD, digital download |
| Maestro EP | Released: 7 April 2005; Label: Kaizerecords, Universal; Format: CD, digital download |
| En for orgelet, en for meg EP | Released: 14 June 2011; Label: Petroleum Records; Format: Digital download |

== Singles ==
| Year | Single | Peak chart positions | Certifications | Album |
| Year | Single | NOR | Certifications | Album |
|---|---|---|---|---|
| 2002 | "Kontroll på kontinentet" | — | | Ompa til du dør |
| 2003 | "Di grind" | — | | Evig pint |
| 2005 | "Maestro" | 5 | | Maestro |
| 2005 | "Knekker deg til sist" | — | | Maestro |
| 2007 | "Enden av november" | 18 | | Maskineri |
| 2008 | "9 mm" | — | | Maskineri |
| 2008 | "Apokalyps meg" | — | | Maskineri |
| 2009 | "Die Polizei" | — | | Våre demoner |
| 2009 | "Prosessen" | — | | Våre demoner |
| 2010 | "Philemon Arthur & the Dung" | 7 | | Violeta Violeta Volume I |
| 2010 | "Hjerteknuser" | 2 | | Violeta Violeta Volume I |
| 2011 | "Tusen dråper regn" | — | | Violeta Violeta Volume II |
| 2011 | "Drøm videre, Violeta" | 20 | | Violeta Violeta Volume II |
| 2012 | "Siste dans" | — | | Violeta Violeta Volume III |
| 2013 | "Stjerner i posisjon" | — | | non-album single |
| 2023 | "Dine gamle dager er nå" | — | | non-album single |
| 2023 | "Kaleidoskophimmel" | — | | non-album single |
| 2024 | "This Is The Kaizer Family" | — | | non-album single |

== Other charted songs ==
| Year | Song | Peak chart positions | Album |
| Year | Song | NOR | Album |
|---|---|---|---|
| 2009 | "Under månen" | 20 | Våre demoner |

== Videography ==
=== Video albums ===
| Title | Details | Certifications |
|---|---|---|
| Viva la Vega | Released: 24 April 2006; Label: Kaizerecords, Universal Music Group; Format: DVD | |
| Live i Oslo Spektrum | Released: 11 November 2011; Label: Petroleum Records; Format: DVD, CD | |
| En Aften i Operaen | Released: 2013; Label: Petroleum Records; Format: DVD | |
| Siste Dans | Released: 2014; Label: Petroleum Records; Format: DVD | |

=== Music videos ===
| Year | Title | Director(s) |
|---|---|---|
| 2002 | "Kontroll på kontinentet" | Eivind Tolås, Flimmer Film |
| 2002 | "Mann Mot Mann" | Tryllefilm |
| 2003 | "Evig pint" | Magnus Martens |
| 2005 | "Maestro" | Uwe Flade |
| 2005 | "Knekker Deg Til Sist" | Magnus Martens |
| 2008 | "Enden av November" | Inge Schreuder-Lindløv |
| 2009 | "Prosessen" | Jørgen Traasdahl |
| 2010 | "Hjerteknuser" | Thomas Aske Berg |
| 2011 | "Drøm videre, Violeta" | Igor Devold |
| 2012 | "Aldri Vodka, Violeta" | Alan Lucien |
| 2012 | "Begravelsespolka" | Eivind Tolås, Flimmer Film |
