= 250 prosent =

Live album by Kaizers Orchestra
- Released: 7 October 2008
- Genre: Alternative rock
- Label: Sony BMG
- Producer: Propeller Studio

Kaizers Orchestra chronology
Maskineri (2008)	250 prosent (2008)	Våre demoner (2009)

Professional ratings
Review scores
Source	Rating
World of Music	4.5/5 stars

250 prosent (250 percent) is a live album by Norwegian alternative rock band Kaizers Orchestra. Released exclusively on vinyl and as a digital download in October 2008, the release features recordings of ten songs (with one bonus track on digital versions purchased in the iTunes Store), recorded at various concerts held during the tour for the band's fourth album, Maskineri, which lasted from February to May 2008.

The name of the album is a reference to the introduction of their organist, Helge Risa (who is seen on the cover).

== Background ==
To tie in with Kaizers Orchestra's upcoming tour of Europe in October and November 2008, the band wanted to release a new recording. At the start of the Maskineri tour, the band purchased a machine that records straight from the audio mixing console and the band recorded every concert they held. The band announced 250 prosent, a collection of twelve recordings from various concerts. Their original plan was to include recordings of the band's three favorite songs from each of their four albums, Ompa til du dør, Evig pint, Maestro and Maskineri. When the track list was released it was clear they had changed those plans.

The decision to release it as a vinyl was made by the band's frontman Janove Ottesen, who had recently grown fond of the aged medium. The band had also released the tracks "Apokalyps meg" and "Du og meg Lou" as a vinyl single earlier that year.

== Track listing ==
Lyrics and music by Janove Ottesen, unless otherwise noted.

No.	Title	English translation	Length
1.	"KGB"		4:05
2.	"Apokalyps meg"	Apocalypse Me	4:11
3.	"Container" (Geir Zahl)	Dumpster	2:31
4.	"Maestro"		5:30
5.	"Dieter Meyers Inst."	Dieter Meyer's Institution	6:40
6.	"Maskineri"	Machinery	5:02
7.	"Volvo i Mexico" (Zahl)	Volvo in Mexico	3:44
8.	"Enden av november"	The End of November	4:13
9.	"Sigøynerblod" (Ottesen/Zahl)	Gypsy Blood	3:03
10.	"170"		5:24
11.	"Ompa til du dør" (iTunes Bonus Track)	Ompa 'till you Die	5:19

== Personnel ==
- Janove Ottesen – vocals
- Geir Zahl – guitar
- Terje Winterstø Røthing – guitar
- Øyvind Storesund – double bass
- Helge Risa – keys, marimba
- Rune Solheim – drums
