= Våre demoner =

Studio album by Kaizers Orchestra
- Released: 27 April 2009
- Recorded: January 2009
- Studios: Bekkstudio (Jæren, Norway)
- Genre: Alternative rock
- Length: 49:38
- Producers: Yngve Sætre, Janove Ottesen

Kaizers Orchestra chronology
| 250 prosent (2008) | Våre demoner (2009) | Violeta Violeta (2011) |

Singles from Våre demoner
- 1. "Die Polizei"; 2. "Prosessen"

Professional ratings
Review scores
| Source | Rating |
|---|---|
| Aftenposten | 5/6 stars |
| Dagbladet | 5/6 stars |

Våre demoner (Norwegian for Our Demons) is the fifth studio album by Norwegian alternative rock band Kaizers Orchestra. Recorded during early 2009, it was released in limited quantities on 27 April 2009. Unlike their four previous albums, the material on Våre demoner consists of re-recorded versions of old material that was never released officially for various reasons. The album's liner notes contain information about how the lyrics relate to one another within the "universe" of the band's songs as well as lyrics.

A week after its release, Våre demoner assumed the number one spot in the official Norwegian album charts.

== Background ==
After the release of Maskineri in 2008, the band toured throughout Europe during fall of that year, playing songs that they had either dropped from their usual set lists a long time prior or had never been played much at all. During this period, rumours began circulating that the band were going to record some of their unrecorded material.

The rumours intensified when, at the beginning of 2009, the band had been spotted in a recording studio in Jæren, Stavanger, Norway. After speculation on the part of the band's fans, information about the album was released on February 14, with a complete track list being released.

== Overview ==
Janove Ottesen has stated that the songs are diverse in origin, with differing styles depending on which era they were from. Three of the songs originated during the writing sessions for Ompa til du dør ("Gruvene på 16", "Prosessen", "Stormfull vals"), four during the Evig pint period ("Kavalér", "Señor Torpedo", "Sonny", "Die Polizei"), three from Maestro ("Medisin og psykiatri", "Våre demoner", "Fanden hakk i hel"), and two from Maskineri ("Den sjette sansen", "Under månen").

The band stressed that although all of the songs were recorded on demos, this would not be a collection of B-sides, but rather new recordings of old material. Several songs from the album had already been heard by fans, such as "Die Polizei", "Medisin og psykiatri" and "Den sjette sansen", which they have played live on several occasions, as well as "Våre demoner" and "Stormfull vals", of which some early demos were leaked. The remainder of the album's tracks were never heard by the public. They recorded the album in more or less one take, recording it as a band and then editing in orchestrated strings, banjo, brass and guest musicians afterwards.

== Promotion ==
Shortly after information about the album came to light, the first single, "Die Polizei", was announced. The single was released on 25 March 2009. On 2 April it was revealed that the various releases of the album would be limited. On 8 April the band released a half-hour documentary chronicling the history and recording sessions of "Die Polizei", directed by Geir Zahl, one of the band's guitarists and founders.

== Track listing ==
Lyrics and music by Janove Ottesen, unless otherwise noted.

Våre demoner track listing
| No. | Title | Music | Length |
|---|---|---|---|
| 1. | "Medisin & psykiatri" (Medicine and Psychiatry) | Janove Ottesen | 4:25 |
| 2. | "Våre demoner" (Our Demons) | Geir Zahl | 2:40 |
| 3. | "Die Polizei" (The Police) | Ottesen | 4:56 |
| 4. | "Fanden hakk i hel" (The Devil on Our Tails) | Ottesen | 3:55 |
| 5. | "Kavalér" (Dance Partner) | Ottesen | 3:42 |
| 6. | "Gruvene på 16" (The Mines on 16) | Ottesen | 4:40 |
| 7. | "Señor Torpedo" | Ottesen | 3:02 |
| 8. | "Den sjette sansen" (The Sixth Sense) | Ottesen | 3:43 |
| 9. | "Sonny" | Ottesen | 4:12 |
| 10. | "Prosessen" (The Process) | Ottesen | 4:10 |
| 11. | "Stormfull vals" (Stormy Waltz) | Zahl | 4:42 |

iTunes Store bonus tracks
| No. | Title | Music | Length |
|---|---|---|---|
| 12. | "Under månen" (Beneath the Moon) | Ottesen | 5:35 |

== Personnel ==
=== Kaizers Orchestra ===
- Janove Ottesen - vocals
- Geir Zahl - guitars
- Terje Winterstø Røthing – guitars
- Øyvind Storesund - double bass
- Helge Risa - keys
- Rune Solheim - drums

=== Additional musicians ===
- Gjertrud Økland – violin & viola
- Bodil Vossgård Mathisrud – cello
- Øyvind Grong – tuba & trombone
- Steven James – French horn
- Jan Kåre Hystad – clarinet
- Ivar Atle Fjordheim – pauker
- Jørgen Sandvik – banjo & nominasjonsukulele on “Prosessen”
- Jan Olav Olsson – banjo on “Stormfull Vals”

=== Technical ===
- Yngve Sætre - producer, mixing
- Janove Ottesen – producer
- Morten Lund – mastering

== Charts ==
=== Weekly charts ===
Weekly chart performance for Våre demoner
| Chart (2009) | Peak position |
|---|---|
| Norwegian Albums (VG-lista) | 1 |
