= Skambankt (album) =

Studio album by Skambankt
- Released: 10 November 2004
- Recorded: Mansion Studio, Norway
- Genre: Hard rock
- Length: 44:12
- Label: DogJob/Tuba Records
- Producer: Skambankt

Skambankt chronology
| Skambankt (2004) | Skamania (EP) (2005) |

Professional ratings
Review scores
| Source | Rating |
|---|---|
| VG | 4/6 stars |
| Panorama | 5/6 stars |

Skambankt is the self-titled first album by Norwegian hard rock band Skambankt. Several of the songs from the band's 1994 demo were recorded for the album, as well as the songs they recorded while being an Urørt band. All the track names have an exclamation mark after them, complementing the band's aggressive style.

All lyrics are in the Norwegian language.

== Track listing ==
All music/lyrics by Ted Winters/Don Fist unless otherwise stated.

1. Skambankt! (Beaten up!)
2. Me sa nei! (We said no!)
3. Desertør! (Deserter!) (Winters/Hans Panzer)
4. Revolusjonens aggregat! (The Fuel of the Revolution!)
5. Panzersjokk! (Panzershock!)
6. Alarm! (Alert!)
7. KKK! (Winters/Geir Zahl)
8. Våre fiender! (Our enemies!) (Zahl)
9. Kapitalens spel! (The Capital Game!)
10. Systemets makt! (Power of the system!)
11. Politistat! (Police state!)

== Trivia ==
- The lyrics for Politistat! are missing from the booklet. It is unknown whether this is a mistake or intentional.
- The track Skambankt! has been featured in the soundtracks for the Norwegian movies Tommys Inferno and Uro.
- The track KKK! was co-written by Ted Winters and Geir Zahl (from Kaizers Orchestra), and Våre Fiender was written entirely by Zahl.
- The track KKK! (which stands for Kristelig KulturKaos (Christian CultureChaos)), features a guest appearance by Prepple Houmb from Norwegian rock band DumDum Boys.
