= Hardt Regn =

Studio album by Skambankt
- Released: January 26, 2009
- Recorded: September 2008
- Studio: Bekk Studio, Nærland, Norway
- Genre: Hard rock
- Length: 40:31
- Label: Dog Job / Tuba Records
- Producer: Terje Winterstø Røthing / Tollak Friestad

Skambankt chronology
Eliksir (2007)	Hardt Regn (2009)	Søvnløs (2010)

Hardt Regn (Hard Rain) is the third studio album by Norwegian hard rock group Skambankt. It was released on January 26, 2009.

The first single from the album, "Malin" was released on the band's MySpace account and several digital music stores in October 2008.

== Background ==
After the release of their 2007 album Eliksir, which scored pretty good reviews and reached No. 8 on the Norwegian album charts, Skambankt toured for most of the year. At the end of the year, the band's frontman Ted Winters joined up with the other band he is a member of, Kaizers Orchestra, to record their new album Maskineri. Skambankt announced that the band would take a break and the members would pursue separate projects until the fall of 2008.

== Recording ==
Reports of a new album in the works first surfaced sometime in mid-2008, on their now defunct website. No further information surfaced before September that year, when the band stated on their MySpace that they were indeed going back to the studio to record their third album in Bekk Studio, Nærland, Norway. The recording sessions started on September 9 and finished on September 27. Some recording also took place inside a church in the area near the studio, due to its "interesting acoustic qualities."

== Release ==
Shortly after the end of the recording sessions, the first single, "Malin", was released on their MySpace account and as a digital single in several digital audio webstores. The song was originally supposed to be featured on Eliksir, but it was ultimately cut. Some other track titles like "Løgnprofitør" and "Vår Bør" were announced somewhere around the same time. In December 2008, the band released a video preview of the album on YouTube.

In January 2009, the band got together to shoot a video for the track "O Dessverre". The video was directed by Stian Kristiansen, the director of the popular Norwegian film The Man Who Loved Yngve.

Later the same month, the band released the entire album on MySpace for previewing purposes. On January 26, the album was released on iTunes as well as Norwegian music retailers, both on regular CD and vinyl.

== Track listing ==
Lyrics for all songs are in the Norwegian language.

1. Vår Bør (Our Burden) - 3:40
2. Kom Hell (Come Luck) - 3:45
3. Løgnprofitør (Profiteer of Lies) - 3:23
4. Det Tar Tid (It Takes Time) - 3:50
5. O Dessverre (Oh Sadly) - 3:51
6. Feil (Wrong) - 3:52
7. Trygge Rammer (Safe Boundaries) - 3:39
8. Slukk Meg (For E.g. Brenner) (Put Me Out [Because I Am Burning]) - 2:37
9. Malin (Malin) - 3:32
10. Når Du Ber Din Nød (When You Beg For Your Life) - 4:04
11. Tanker Som Mareritt (Thoughts Like Nightmares) - 4:18

== Chart ==
Chart (2009)	Peak position
Norwegian Albums (VG-lista)	5
