= Britt-Synnøve Johansen =

Norwegian female singer (born 1970)

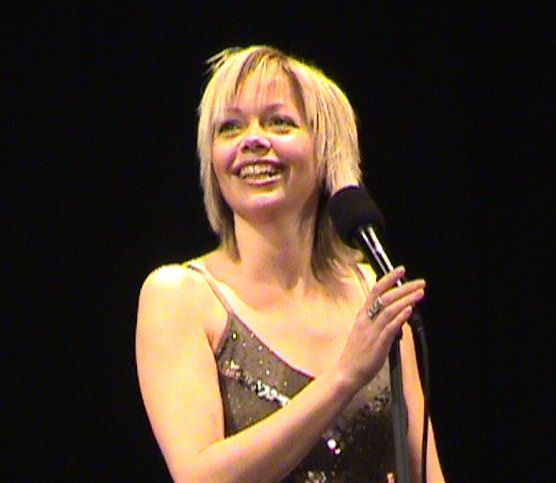
- Britt-Synnøve Johansen

Background information
- Born: 23 June 1970 (age 55)
- Origin: Haugesund, Rogaland, Norway
- Occupation: Singer

Britt-Synnøve Johansen (born 23 June 1970) is a Norwegian female singer. She represented Norway in Eurovision Song Contest 1989, where she finished 17th.

== Biography ==
She was born in Haugesund, Rogaland, and started her musical career by singing in a choir for 7 years. She participated in a talent contest for new singers and got to the final. In 1989, she won the Melodi Grand Prix performing the song "Venners nærhet". Despite finishing 17th in the Eurovision Song Contest, she didn't finish her musical career. She participated in several shows like that in the Rogaland theater. She also performed in theatrical shows like Schrooge – en julefortelling.

In 2001, Synnøve recorded versions of Edith Piaf's songs in Paris and appeared in many shows of Piaf's cabaret, which had 15,000 spectators. Between 2003 and 2004 she appeared as Eponine in the musical Les Misérables, in Bømlo in Hordaland.

She is married to Jan Zahl, brother of Geir Zahl from Kaizers Orchestra.

In 2010 she released an album of Norwegian tangos, titled "Skyt meg med tre roser", produced by Janove Ottesen from Kaizers Orchestra.

== Discography ==
- God morgen – 1990
- Mot himmlen i Paris – Piaf på norsk- 2002 (she sings Édith Piaf´s songs in Norwegian)
- Skyt meg med tre roser – 2010
- På reis, på reis – 2017

Awards and achievements
Preceded by Karoline Krüger with "For vår jord"	Norway in the Eurovision Song Contest; 1989	Succeeded by Ketil Stokkan with "Brandenburger Tor"
