= Skambankt =

Norwegian hard rock band

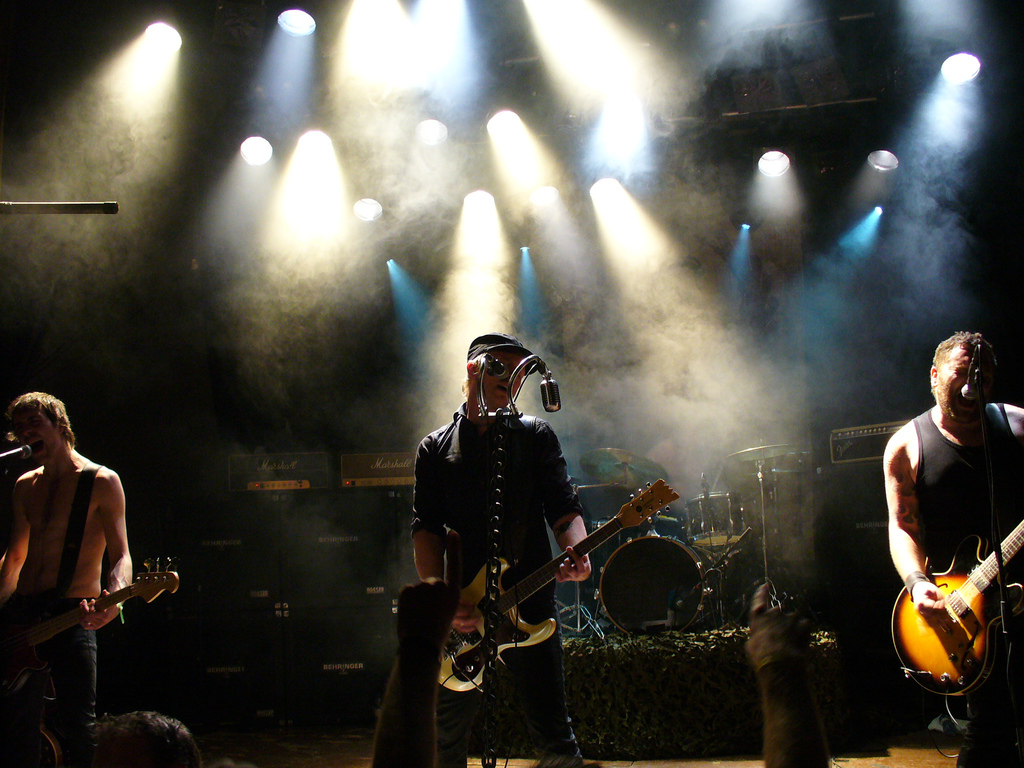

Background information
- Origin: Norway
- Genres: Rock, Hard rock
- Years active: 1994–1995; 2004–present
- Labels: DogJob, Tuba Records, Sony, Columbia
- Members: Terje Winterstø Røthing; Tollak Friestad; Hans Egil Løe; Børge Henriksen; Jonny Engelsvoll
- Past members: Tom Skalle
- Website: Skambankt.com

Skambankt (Beaten to a pulp or beaten up) was a Norwegian hard rock band from Klepp Municipality, just south of Stavanger, formed in 1994. They played their last concert on November 4, 2022, at the DNB Arena in Stavanger.

They played a mixture of classic rock'n'roll, punk and hardrock in the tradition of bands like Motörhead, AC/DC, Sex Pistols, Ramones and The Stooges, with lyrics against the state, the system, religious fanaticism, hatred, capitalism, and betrayal among other things. All song lyrics are in Norwegian (Nynorsk).

== History ==
=== Formation ===
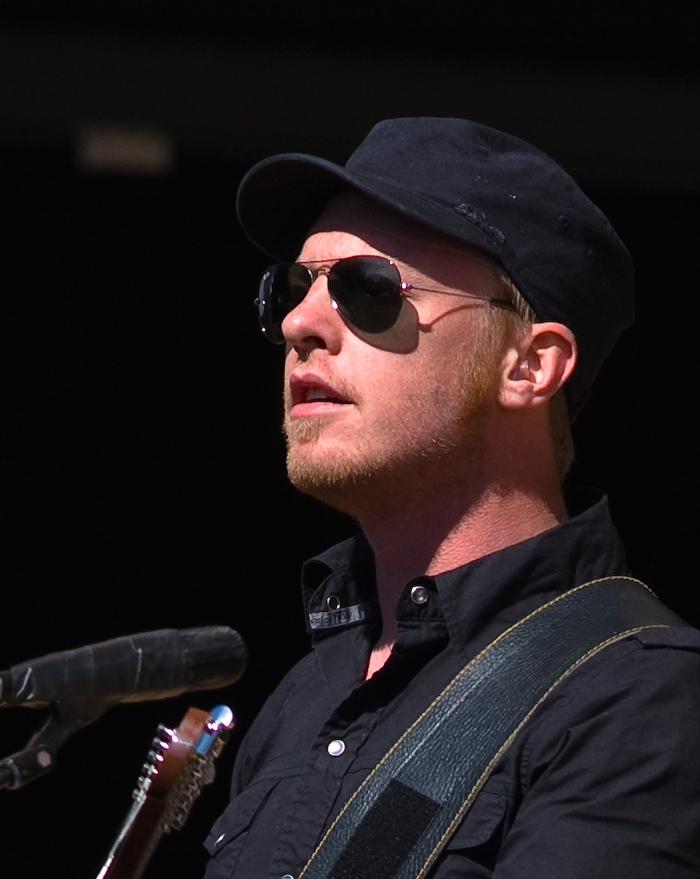
Terje Winterstø Røthing

Skambankt was formed in 1994 at Klepp Rockeklubb in Kleppe when a band scheduled to play couldn't make it. Ted Winters (Terje Winterstø, guitar and vocals), Don Fist (Tollak Friestad, bass), and Hans Panzer (Hans Egil Løe, drums) wrote 9 songs in the period of about 3 hours and played that night in place of the other band. They continued to play in live-gigs and made demo recordings from fall 1994 to spring of 1995, disbanding thereafter.

The original line-up met again at a bachelor party in 2003 and decided to reform. Pursuing record deals, Hans Panzer shifted from drums to rhythm guitar and backing vocals and recruited Tom Skalle (Tom-Erik Løe) to act as drummer. The band signed for Norwegian record company DogJob and started work on their self-titled album Skambankt, released in November 2004. Skambankt was developed with help from Geir Zahl (songwriting, Kaizers Orchestra) and Prepple Houmb (guest vocals, DumDum Boys) for tracks like "Kristelig KulturKaos".

=== Skamania EP, Roskilde festival, and Wolsman joins ===
Skambankt released the EP Skamania on June 15 of 2005, just two weeks before playing at Roskilde Festival in Denmark. Skamania consisted of six new tracks and produced two music videos which bolstered their setlist at Roskilde. This was the largest venue the band had played at, with an estimated audience of 20,000 members.

That year, Bones Wolsman (Børge Henriksen) joined the band, replacing Tom Skalle on drums.

=== Eliksir and Hardt Regn ===
In 2007, they released their second full-length album, Eliksir (Elixir), with the album title inspired by Harry Potter. The first single from the album, The first single from the album, "Tyster" was b-listed on Norwegian radio with "Dynasi" also receiving significant radio time on NRK P3. Eliksir received positive reviews and entered the Norwegian album charts at 8th place. This kicked off extensive touring in Norway and Denmark for the rest of 2007.

In fall 2008, Skambankt entered the studio for a third time, this time to record their third album, Hardt Regn (Hard Rain). The first single from the album, "Malin" was released on their MySpace in October. The album was released on January 27, and received good reviews as well as a respectable chart placement during the first week of its release. "Malin", "O dessverre", "Vår bør", and "Slukk meg" proved popular with fans and became regulars in concert setlists. Hardt Regn was nominated for the 2009 Spellemannprisen for best rock album.

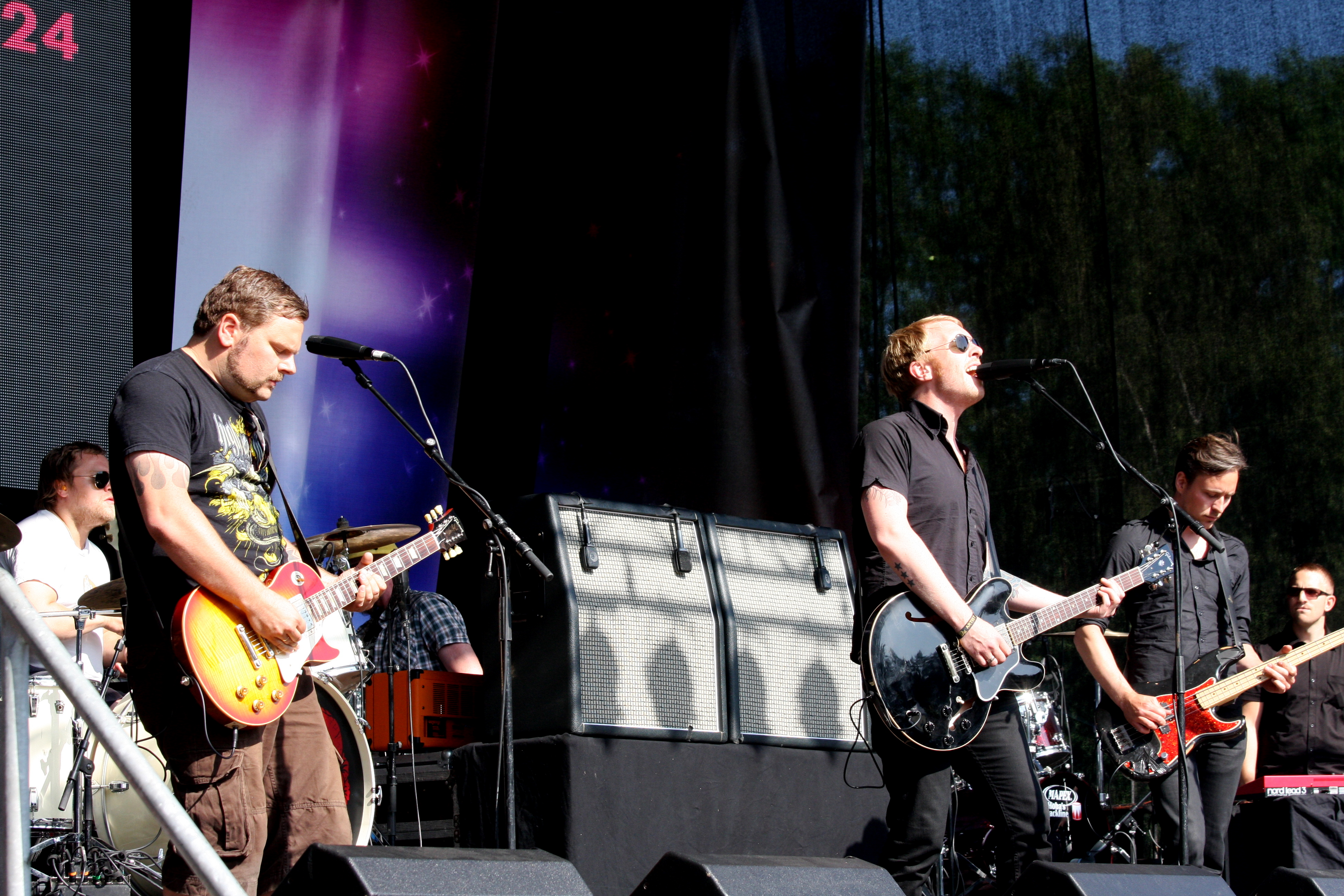
Skambankt lineup prior to the release of Søvnløs

Skambankt supported the Danish rockband D-A-D on their Monster Philosophy Tour in Denmark in 2009 and AC/DC at their Valle Hovin, Oslo concert on June 15, 2009. They continued touring at Pstereo in August.

=== Moving to Columbia Records: Søvnløs and Voodoo ===
Following the release of Hardt Regn, Skambankt signed with Columbia Records. They released their fourth full-length effort entitled Søvnløs (Sleepless) on September 6, 2010. The album's first single "Mantra" was released on the 17th of May, the Norwegian national day.

The fifth album Sirene (Siren) was released on January 27, 2014. It was well-received and peaked at number 1 on the Norwegian charts, charting for 5 weeks. The first single of the album, "Voodoo", was released in November 2013 with a marketing stunt where fans could hand in old plastic guitars which would then be melted in and transformed into vinyl records. This earned them the award of Spotify Innovator of the Year in January 2014, presented at the Spillmannprisen 2013 ceremony in Stavanger. The single was accompanied by its own brand of beer, brewed at Kinn Bryggeri in Florø, and called "Voodoo" as well.

Skambankt did extensive touring in 2014, playing songs from Sirene at Steinkjer festival, Roskilde festival, and Pstereo festival in Trondheim.

=== Indie Recordings ===
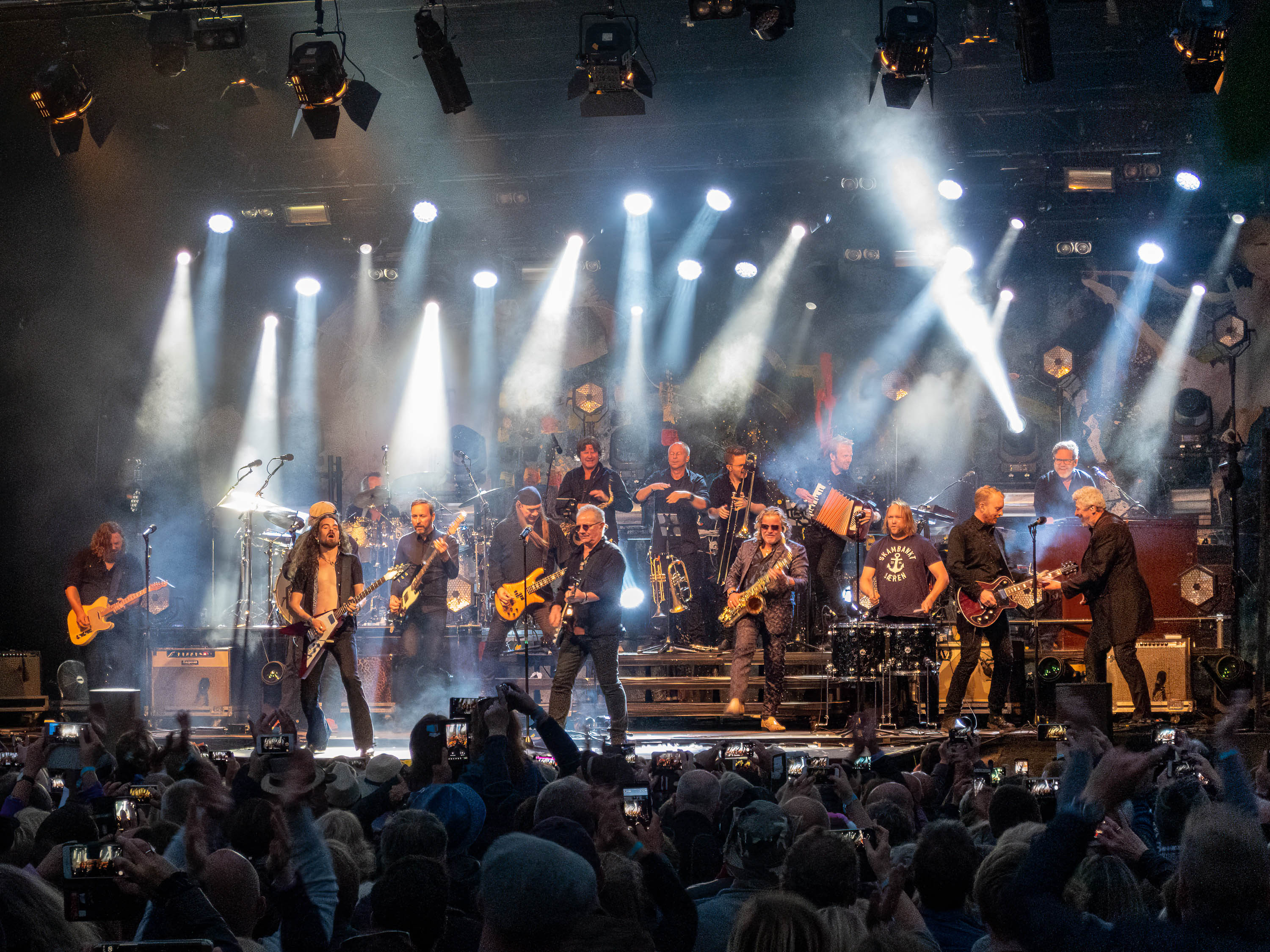
Skambankt at Rootsfestivalen in Brønnøysund, on stage with Åge Aleksandersen og Sambandet and Bjørn Eidsvåg

Skambankt signed with record company Indie Recordings prior to work on their sixth album, produced by Janove Ottesen. A single from the album, Fremmed I En Fremmed Verden (Stranger in a Strange World), released in 2017 prior to the full release of Horisonten brenner (The horizon is burning) on February 9, 2018. Speaking with NPS Music, Skambankt detailed that they had worked hard to build a studio for the new album out of an old pig shed which took longer than anticipated. The album was a success and peaked at No. 6 in the Norwegian charts (VG-lista), with the Stavanger Aftenblad calling it "heavy and solid". Horisonten brenner marked a change in tone for the band, with songs like "Horisonten Brenner" and "Levende Legende (Living legend)" (as well as "Balladen Om Deg" on the 2017 single) incorporating pianos and keyboards for a rock ballad feel. During this time, Jonny Engelsvoll was recruited to cover keyboard parts (having previously played pianos and organs for Hardt Regn and Søvnløs). The band went on a long tour in Norway which concluded at the Rockefeller Music Hall in Oslo. The live performance from the Rockefeller was recorded as Rockefeller 09.03.18.

Marking Skambankt's 25 years as a band, 1994 released in 2019. Stylized as a MTV Unplugged album, the group unveiled "Når eg sover (When I sleep)" as the title track and rerecorded 11 songs from prior albums. They opened for Bon Jovi (along with The Golden Circles) at Sr-Bank Arena in Stavanger for the This House Is Not for Sale Tour on June 8, 2019.

Due to the COVID-19 pandemic, recording for the next album Jærtegn (Milestone), was delayed. In 2020, they had planned an unplugged tour in the spring, but had to delay it until the fall. Jærtegn released on January 29, 2021, with the band travelling from February to April (Oslo to Trondheim) to promote the album. The album was planned to be somewhere between an unplugged album and their more conventional rock sound, functioning as a more "pandemic friendly sound".

The band's final album, Ti (Ten), released in September 2021. Including their Rockefeller 09.03.18 live album, Ti marked their 10th studio album. Following the release of Ti, the band embarked on a final tour with the "Grand Finale" in 2022.

Throughout much of Skambankt's life, Ted Winters was also the guitarist for Kaizer's Orchestra, which took a major hiatus beginning in 2013. In a 2022 interview with NRK, Ted Winters said that for many years he did not want to play in Kaizers Orchestra again, but now was feeling very ambitious and had big plans.

== Line-up ==
Final line-up:

- Ted Winters (Terje Winterstø Røthing) – guitar, vocals
- Hanz Panzer (Hans Egil Løe) – guitar, backing vocals
- Don Fist (Tollak Friestad) – bass, backing vocals
- Bones Wolsman (Børge Henriksen) – drums
- Jonny Engelsvoll – keys

Former members:

- Tom-Skalle (Tom-Erik Løe) – drums, backing vocals (2003-2006)

== Discography ==
=== Studio albums ===
- Skambankt (2004)
- Eliksir (2007)
- Hardt Regn (2009)
- Søvnløs (2010)
- Sirene (2014)
- Horisonten brenner (2018)
- 1994 (2019)
- Jærtegn (2021)
- Ti (2022)

=== Live Albums ===
- Rockefeller 09.03.18 (2018)

=== EPs/Singles/Others ===
- Skamania (EP)|Skamania (2005)
- Mantra (2010)
- Fremmed I En Fremmed Verden/Balladen Om Deg (2017)
- For En Evighet/Om Nettene (2019)
- Skumring / Liden (2019)
