= Horisonten brenner =

Studio album by Skambankt
- Released: 9 February 2018
- Recorded: 2017
- Studio: Bore Gardsrockeri, Norway
- Genre: Rock, hard rock
- Label: Indie Recordings
- Producer: Janove Ottesen, Skambankt

Skambankt chronology
Sirene (2014)	Horisonten brenner (2018)	1994 (2019)

Horisonten brenner is the sixth studio album by Norwegian hard rock band Skambankt. It was recorded over the course of several years at Bore Gardsrockeri. Janove Ottesen from Kaizers Orchestra was involved as producer.

The first single Fremmed i en fremmed verden was released on November 17, 2017. This single also contained a b-side, Balladen om deg, that is not included on the album.

== Track listing ==
1. "I dette huset" ("In This House")
2. "Når imperiet faller" ("When the Empire Falls")
3. "Protest dommer" ("Objection Your Honor")
4. "Fremmed i en fremmed verden" ("Stranger in a Strange World")
5. "Horisonten brenner" ("The Horizon Is Burning")
6. "Kommer snart hjem" ("Coming Home Soon")
7. "Levende legende" ("Living legend")
8. "Stein for stein" ("Stone by Stone")
9. "Gribben" ("The Vulture")

== Charts ==
Chart (2018)	Peak position
Norwegian Albums (VG-lista)	6
