= Sirene (album) =

Studio album by Skambankt
- Released: 27 January 2014
- Recorded: 2013
- Studio: Propeller Studios, Norway
- Genre: Hard rock
- Length: 39:16
- Label: Columbia Records
- Producer: Kåre Vestrheim

Skambankt chronology
Søvnløs (2010)	Sirene (2014)	Horisonten brenner (2018)

Sirene (Norwegian for 'siren' but referencing the voodoo "Mami Wata") is the fifth studio album by Norwegian Hard rock band Skambankt. It was recorded at Propeller Studios with Kåre Vestrheim as producer. The album is described as "mature, dark, and heavy, and at the same time more catchy and ambitious than before". The album reached number one on the Norwegian album charts in the first week after release.

The demo for the album was recorded at Bore Gardsrockeri, an old potato cellar in Klepp in Jæren/Norway, throughout the years 2012 and 2013. The lyrics were mostly written by Terje Winterstø Røthing. The Norwegian singer/songwriter Tønes contributes to the record, singing on the song Sånne som deg.

The first single Voodoo was released on November 11, 2013, and was accompanied by a marketing stunt where fans could hand in an old plastic guitar in exchange for a vinyl single.

== Track listing ==
1. Anonyme hatere (Anonymous haters)
2. Som en sirene (Like a siren)
3. Voodoo
4. Sort blod (Black blood)
5. Gamle spøkelser (Old ghosts)
6. Våre folk (Our people)
7. Sånne som deg (People like you)
8. Ulv, ulv (Wolf, wolf)
9. Nemesis
10. Kald, kald natt (Cold, cold night)

== Chart ==
Chart (2014)	Peak position
Norwegian Albums (VG-lista)	1
