= Søvnløs =

Søvnløs (the Norwegian and Danish word for sleepless) may refer to:

- Søvnløs (album), fourth studio album by Norwegian hard rock band Skambankt
- "Søvnløs" (KESI song), song by Norwegian rapper KESI from his 2014 album Barn af byen
- "Søvnløs" (Burhan G song), song by Burhan G from his 2010 self-titled album
- "Søvnløs", 2014 song by Danish L.I.G.A
