= Uncle Deadly (band) =

Norwegian band

Uncle Deadly is a Norwegian band from Stavanger. They were formed in 2009 as the second solo project of Kaizers Orchestra guitarist Geir Zahl. Morten Abel (known from The September When, Peltz, Mods, and his solo work), Christer Knutsen (previous played on Zahl's solo albums), and Børge Fjordheim (from Cloroform) later joined the band and they became a full group. Several artists like Thomas Dybdahl, Thom Hell, and Janove Ottesen made guest appearances on their debut album.

The name "Uncle Deadly" is a reference to a Muppet with the same name (also known as "Phantom of The Muppet Show"). This was mainly because Zahl wasn't really comfortable with naming a band after himself, as he had with his other project. He gave his new band more of a theatrical theme, where he played a character partially based on himself, not unlike the aliases in Kaizers Orchestra.

== Members ==
- Geir Zahl – Vocals, guitar
- Morten Abel – Bass, guitar
- Børge Fjordheim – Drums, percussion
- Christer Knutsen – Guitar, Hammond, piano

== Discography ==
- Monkey do (2010)
