= Uncle Deadly =

Uncle Deadly may refer to:

- Uncle Deadly (Muppet), a character from the Muppets
- Uncle Deadly (band), a Norwegian band
