= Eliksir =

Studio album by Skambankt
- Released: 29 January 2007
- Recorded: 2007
- Studio: Propeller Music Division, Norway
- Genre: Rock; Hard rock
- Length: 44:12
- Label: DogJob/Tuba Records
- Producer: Winters/Fist

Skambankt chronology
Skamania (EP) (2005)	Eliksir (2007)	Hardt Regn (2009)

Professional ratings
Review scores
Source	Rating
Aftenposten	5/6 stars
Dagbladet	5/6 stars
Gaffa	4/6 stars
Side 2	5/6 stars
Stavanger Aftenblad	5/6 stars
VG	2/6 stars

Eliksir (Elixir) is the second studio album by Norwegian hard rock band Skambankt. The first single "Tyster" received a decent amount of radio airplay, and it entered the Norwegian album charts on 8th place the week after its release. A video was made to promote the record's second single "Dynasti". The "Intro", which is the main riff of "Nok et Offer" played on church bells, was played on the bells of the clocktower of Oslo Rådhus in Oslo and recorded. "Nok et Offer" originally appeared on the Skamania EP, but was re-recorded for this album. The track "Siste Stikk" was recorded in the independent studio Suksesslaboratoriet rather than the Propeller Music Division Studio.

== Track listing ==
All music/lyrics by Ted Winters/Don Fist unless otherwise noted. All lyrics are in the Norwegian language.

1. "Intro"
2. "Nok et Offer" (Another Victim)
3. "Dynasti" (Dynasty)
4. "Stormkast #1" (Gust #1)
5. "Tyster" (Snitch)
6. "Ordets Gud" (God of Words)
7. "Min Eliksir" (My Elixir)
8. "Siste Stikk" (Last Laugh) (Winters)
9. "Fritt Fall" (Free Fall) (Winters)
10. "Angst"
11. "Idyllillusjonen" (The Utopia Illusion)
12. "Bak Låste Dører" (Behind Locked Doors)

== Chart ==
Chart (2007)	Peak position
Norwegian Albums (VG-lista)	8
