= Violeta Violeta =

Series of albums by Kaizers Orchestra

Studio album by Kaizers Orchestra
- Released: 2011 & 2012
- Recorded: February 2010 – May 2012
- Studios: Duper Studio, (Bergen, Norway)
- Genre: Alternative rock
- Length: 39:12 (Vol. I), 38:31 (Vol. II), 61:36 (Vol. III); 139:19 (total)
- Producers: Jørgen Træen, Yngve Sætre, Janove Ottesen

Kaizers Orchestra chronology
| Våre demoner (2009) | Violeta Violeta (2011) |

Violeta Violeta is a series of studio albums by Norwegian alternative rock band Kaizers Orchestra, comprising their sixth, seventh, and eighth studio albums. The album trilogy was released throughout 2011 and 2012.

Vol. I was released on 31 January 2011, going straight to #1 in VG-lista, the official Norwegian Albums Chart in its first week of release. Vol. II was released on 11 November 2011, and Vol. III on 2 November 2012.

== Background ==
In 2007, Kaizers Orchestra's co-founder and primary songwriter Janove Ottesen hit a major creative boon, and composed two to three songs every day for ten days. Using this extensive backlog of material as a basis, Ottesen conceptualized a trilogy of albums based around the same theme. Retreating to the studio in the basement of his home with an oil barrel, Ottesen recorded a "bare-bones" demo of songs intended for the trilogy. Basic information was provided regarding Kaizers Orchestra next studio album in 2009, citing a 2011 release. Later, the band announced the Studio Tour, a four-concert tour of Norway whose proceeds would finance the new album. Concert attendees were given a mail-in letter for a limited edition of the first album in the series. The albums' title and format, owing to Ottesen's extensive songwriting sessions in 2009, was revealed on 10 February 2010, the day of the first show of the Studio Tour. During an interview with NRK, it was stated that each album would have 10 songs, breaking the standard they had set of 12 per album. When asked if there would be more songs on the limited edition of the albums, they denied it, sticking with 10 per album for the trilogy.

== Recording ==
Recording sessions for the first of three albums began on 28 February 2010 in Duper Studios in Bergen. Jørgen Træen, Yngve Sætre, and Ottesen acted as producers. On 11 March Ottesen revealed that 12 songs had been recorded in 12 days, completing the first album in the trilogy. The recording of additional instruments such as strings and orchestra was scheduled for a later date. On 7 June 2010 their official site confirmed the completion of Vol. I, as well as the release of the first single in August, and the second single in early January 2011 (though this was changed to October 2010). According to an interview with VG following the release of their first single, they explained that the first two albums of the trilogy had already been recorded, as the first album only took a fortnight. Participating guest musicians include the Stavanger Symphony Orchestra and a 14-year-old girl (Lykke Sofie Myrås, the sister of Janove's wife). In an interview with Aftenbladet it was revealed that they would be recording the third installment of the trilogy in December 2011, before the tour supporting Volume II. They only recorded the first half of Vol. III in December; they finished recording in May 2012, once they finished touring for Vol II. They brought back the Stavanger Symphony Orchestra, utilizing them as an integral part of the final album of the trilogy.

== Vol. I ==
Violeta Violeta Volume I

Studio album by Kaizers Orchestra
- Released: 31 January 2011
- Recorded: February–March 2010
- Studios: Duper Studio, (Bergen, Norway)
- Genre: Alternative rock
- Length: 39:12
- Producers: Jørgen Træen, Yngve Sætre, Janove Ottesen

Kaizers Orchestra chronology
| Våre demoner (2009) | Violeta Violeta Volume I (2011) | Violeta Violeta Vol. II (2011) |

Singles from Violeta Violeta Volume I
- 1. "Philemon Arthur & the Dung"; 2. "Hjerteknuser"; 3. "En for orgelet, en for meg"

=== Promotion ===
The first single from the first volume of the trilogy, "Philemon Arthur & the Dung", was released digitally on 24 August 2010. In October the single was moved to the "A-list" of Norwegian radio station NRK P3, the highest priority playlist on the station, providing the song with more frequent airplay and exposure. To promote the release of the second single, "Hjerteknuser", Kaizers Orchestra released the official notes and lyrics to the song for free download, allowing unsigned musicians to record their own version of the song. The winner, Moi, was announced on Norwegian radio on 27 October 2010, who is scheduled to have her cover of "Hjerteknuser" released on Kaizers Orchestra's proprietary record label, and the opportunity to tour with them in 2011; during the same broadcast, Kaizers Orchestra's own version of the song received its world premiere. The second- and third-place winners of the competition were also given permission to release their separate versions. The music video for Kaizers Orchestra's "Hjerteknuser" stars Norwegian actress Ane Dahl Torp portraying Beatrice, one of the characters from the lyrical "universe" of Violeta Violeta.

For their third single, "En for orgelet, en for meg", they collaborated with guest rappers from Germany (Prinz Pi), Sweden (Timbuktu), and The Netherlands (Blaxtar) to create versions of the song to be released in those countries. The album version of the song is made available for digital download upon pre-ordering the first album. To further promote the album, Ottesen and Øyvind Storesund, the group's bassist, embarked on a tour of small venues in Europe, performing as an acoustic double act. In the ten remaining days leading up to the album's release, the band uploaded videos starring Helge Risa, the pump organist, recorded during the preproduction period for the supporting tour. Guitarist Geir Zahl also uploaded a documentary about the making of the album to YouTube.

=== Track listing ===
Lyrics and music by Janove Ottesen.

| No. | Title | Length |
|---|---|---|
| 1. | "Philemon Arthur & the Dung" | 3:22 |
| 2. | "Diamant til kull" (Diamond to Coal) | 3:43 |
| 3. | "Femtakt filosofi" (Philosophy in 5/4 Time) | 4:13 |
| 4. | "Din kjole lukter bensin, mor" (Your Dress Smells of Gasoline, Mother) | 3:16 |
| 5. | "En for orgelet, en for meg" (One for the Organ, One for Me) | 3:05 |
| 6. | "Tumor i ditt hjerte" (Tumor in Your Heart) | 4:24 |
| 7. | "Hjerteknuser" (Heartbreaker) | 3:20 |
| 8. | "Psycho under min hatt" (Psycho under My Hat) | 3:03 |
| 9. | "Svarte katter & flosshatter" (Black Cats & Top Hats) | 5:12 |
| 10. | "Sju bøtter tårer er nok, Beatrice" (Seven Buckets of Tears are Enough, Beatrice) | 5:11 |

== Vol. II ==
Violeta Violeta Volume II

Studio album by Kaizers Orchestra
- Released: 11 November 2011
- Recorded: 2010
- Studios: Duper Studio, (Bergen, Norway)
- Genre: Alternative rock
- Length: 38:31
- Producers: Jørgen Træen, Yngve Sætre, Janove Ottesen

Kaizers Orchestra chronology
| Violeta Violeta Vol. I (2011) | Violeta Violeta Volume II (2011) | Live i Oslo Spektrum (2011) |

Singles from Violeta Violeta Volume II
- 1. "Tusen dråper regn" 2. "Drøm videre, Violeta"

=== Promotion ===
On 1 March, before the start of the European tour in support of Vol. I, the band announced that Vol. II would be performed, in its entirety, for the first time at the Øya Festival on 11 August 2011. The event was streamed online the day following the event. The first single from Vol. II, "Tusen dråper regn", was premiered on 31 May 2011 on the radio show P3Morgen. It was confirmed in radio interviews conducted around the release of the single that Geir Zahl would be performing lead vocals on two self-composed songs on the album. The second single of the album, "Drøm videre Violeta", was released on 23 September 2011, and within a week of the release was a-listed on P1 and P3.

Beginning on 1 November 2011, the band asked their fans to get involved with the 11-day countdown to the release of the album, Live i Oslo Spektrum, and "Sonny," their stage musical. They encouraged their fans to upload pictures to their Facebook page that showed the number of days until the release, and each day the band chose a different, fan-uploaded picture as their profile picture. They've also held a contest for fans to come up with a poster design to be sold at their merchandise booth during the tour for Vol. II. The album was initially release in Norway on 11 November 2011, and internationally on 20 January 2012. Their tour in support of the album consisted primarily of Norwegian concert venues, only playing a few European shows at the beginning of the tour. In the midst of their promotional tour they went back into the studio in May to finish the recording of Vol. III, then commenced with summer festivals, which they stated would be a continued support for Vol. II.

=== Track listing ===
All songs written by Janove Ottesen unless otherwise noted.

| No. | Title | Music | Length |
|---|---|---|---|
| 1. | "I ett med verden" (At One with the World) | Janove Ottesen, Geir Zahl | 5:44 |
| 2. | "Støv og sand" (Dust and Sand) | Ottesen | 3:49 |
| 3. | "Tusen dråper regn" (A Thousand Drops of Rain) | Ottesen | 3:47 |
| 4. | "Drøm videre, Violeta" (Dream On, Violeta) | Ottesen | 3:27 |
| 5. | "Far til datter" (Father to Daughter) | Ottesen | 3:30 |
| 6. | "Faen i båten" (Devil in the Boat) | Ottesen | 2:02 |
| 7. | "Gresk komedie" (Greek Comedy) | Zahl | 3:34 |
| 8. | "Silver" | Ottesen | 4:12 |
| 9. | "Domino" | Zahl | 3:15 |
| 10. | "Den romantiske tragedien" (The Romantic Tragedy) | Ottesen | 5:11 |

== Vol. III ==
Violeta Violeta Volume III

Studio album by Kaizers Orchestra
- Released: 2 November 2012
- Recorded: December 2011 – May 2012
- Studios: Duper Studio, (Bergen, Norway)
- Genres: symphonic rock, alternative
- Length: 61:36
- Producers: Jørgen Træen, Yngve Sætre, Janove Ottesen

Kaizers Orchestra chronology
| Live i Oslo Spektrum (2011) | Violeta Violeta Volume III (2012) |

Singles from Violeta Violeta Volume III
- 1. "Siste dans"

=== Promotion ===
Prior to September, little promotion had been done. Janove engaged in an interview with a fan site about the future of the band, where he revealed a few details of the album, such as the name of the first single. He also took this time to explain that after the release of Vol. III, and the subsequent tour, the band would take an undetermined period of time to pursue other projects. He made it clear that this was not the end, only a long break.

On 7 September 2012 a mysterious video of Omen and a little girl (Violeta) in a forest appeared on YouTube (later revealed to be from the "Aldri vodka, Violeta" video). The only text that accompanied the video read "We're here to spread the Kaizervirus. You will get infected and there is no cure." The following day, a "Kaizervirus" website was found. Soon after the virus took shape; the band asked their fans to submit why they would be best suited to spread the Kaizervirus, and a week later they selected a person and the Kaizervirus smartphone app was released. The app spread various "viruses" by proximity to other "infected" individuals. Once one virus was spread around enough, they would release the next one, relying heavily on the fans to promote the new album. The viruses, in order, are: "Aldri Vodka, Violeta" (song), "Siste Dans Intro" (song), "Siste Dans" (song), "Aldri Vodka, Violeta" (music video), "Behind the Scenes at Budapest" (documentary video), "Forloveren" (song), "Det polaroide liv" (song), and "Perfekt i en drøm" (song).

=== Track listing ===
All songs written by Janove Ottesen unless noted.

| No. | Title | Music | Length |
|---|---|---|---|
| 1. | "Begravelsespolka" (Funeral Polka) | Janove Ottesen | 7:06 |
| 2. | "Forloveren" (The Maid of Honor) | Ottesen | 7:24 |
| 3. | "Aldri vodka, Violeta" (Never Vodka, Violeta) | Ottesen | 6:53 |
| 4. | "Tvilling" (Twin) | Ottesen | 7:38 |
| 5. | "Det polaroide liv" (The Polaroid Life) | Ottesen, Zahl | 3:50 |
| 6. | "Siste dans" (Last Dance) | Ottesen | 3:44 |
| 7. | "Markedet bestemmer" (The Market Decides) | Ottesen, Zahl | 6:30 |
| 8. | "Satan i halsen" (Satan in Your Throat) | Ottesen, Zahl | 4:30 |
| 9. | "Perfekt i en drøm" (Perfect in a Dream) | Ottesen | 7:44 |
| 10. | "Sekskløver" (Six-leaf Clover) | Ottesen | 6:17 |

== Guest musicians ==
- Haldi Rønning: Violin (vol. I; 1, 2, 3, 7, 10), (vol. II; 4)
- Mari Persen: Violin (vol. I; 1, 2, 3, 7, 10), (vol. II; 4)
- Karoline Vik Hegge: Viola (vol. I; 1, 2, 3, 7, 10), (vol. II; 4)
- Matias J. Monsen: Cello (vol. I; 1, 2, 3, 7, 10), (vol. II; 4)
- Lykke Sofie Myrås: Vocal (vol. I; 5, 9)
- Anand Chetty: Cowbell (vol. I; 4), Choir (vol. I; 1)
- Øyvind Grung: Tuba (vol. I; 3,9), Trombone (vol. I; 3)
- Kjetil Møster: Sax (vol. I; 8, 9), (vol. II; 2), (vol. III; 1)
- Iver Sandøy: Choir (vol. I; 1), Marimba (vol. I; 7), Percussion (vol. II; 5, 8), (vol. III; 8), Snare Drum (vol. III; 10)
- Jørgen Træen: MS20 (vol. I; 7), Beerflute (vol. I; 5), (vol. II;2), Clapping (vol. II; 5), Synth (vol. III; 6)
- Yngve Leidulv Sætre: Piano “plingplong” (vol. I; 7), Backing vocals (vol. I; 6), Synth (vol. III; 6), Clapping (vol. III; 6)
- Teresia Sætre Aarskog, Rebekka Sætre Aarskog, Jarle Solheim, Maria K. Solheim: Choir & Clapping (vol. I; 1)
- Ove André Boland, Truls Sveri Lier, Joachim Pedersen, Tommy Ones Thorstensen: Snare Drum (vol. II; 3)
- Kids from Bryne Ungdomsskule: Choir (vol. II; 5)
- Stian Jacobsen: Claps (vol. III; 6)
- Jørgen Sandvik: Sitar (vol. III; 7)
- Stavanger Symphony Orchestra:
  - Directed by Trond Korsgaard (vol. I; 6, 9), (vol. II; 10)
  - Directed by Nick Davies (vol. III; 1, 4, 5, 7, 8, 9, 10)
  - Directed by Erlend Skomsvoll (vol. III; 2, 3)
- Orchestra Soloists:
  - Roy Holtan: Piccolo trumpet (vol. III; 3)
  - Vidar Austvik: Flute (vol. III; 7)
  - Zuzana Pestukova: Harp (vol. III; 4)
