= Gnom =

Norwegian folk music band

gnom
- Origin: Bryne, Norway
- Genre: Folk
- Years active: 1995–2000
- Label: Shimmer Recordings
- Past members: Janove Ottesen; Geir Zahl; Helge Risa; Rune Solheim; Rolf Prestø

gnom (gnome) was a Norwegian folk music band, the third band started by Janove Ottesen and Geir Zahl. Despite being relatively obsolete on the Norwegian musical scene, it is an important part of the creation of Kaizers Orchestra.

== History ==
After Ottesen and Zahl's previous band, Blod Snått & Juling, dissolved, Janove joined the army, where he wrote some songs that were recorded on a demo (known to fans as Janoves Soloprosjekt). Some of these songs wound up being recorded on the acoustic demo for the new band Janove and Geir started when they were together again, namely, gnom. Janove and Geir were soon joined by Helge Risa on pump organ, and Rune Solheim on drums (the two would later continue on as members of Kaizers Orchestra) and Rolf Prestø, known as "Bestefar", (grandpa) on bass. gnom's first, and only, release was Mys (1997), of which there were made 1000 copies, less than half of which were sold in the first year of its release.

The band had to struggle to obtain any performance spots, and if one was available, the spectators were about 20, average. However, after the release of Mys, Janove wrote a song called "Bastard", which had a very Tom Waits-esque sound to it, and for which the band utilized oil barrels as percussion. However, the band quickly began to dissolve due to lack of gigs and success. However, Ottesen decided to write songs in the same vein as "Bastard", and as a result, he and Geir created a new band, known as Kaizers Orchestra.

Today, an original copy of Mys is a rare collector's item coveted by fans of Kaizers Orchestra.

== Discography ==
=== Albums ===
- Mys (1998)
- Mys (Remastered) (2003)
