= Live at Vega =

Live album by Kaizers Orchestra
- Released: 6 March 2006
- Recorded: 6 October 2005
- Venue: Vega, Copenhagen, Denmark.
- Genre: Rock
- Length: 1:48:20 (or 108 minutes)
- Label: Kaizerecords, Virgin
- Producer: Janove Ottesen

Kaizers Orchestra chronology
Maestro (2005)	Live at Vega (2006)	Maskineri (2008)

Live at Vega is a two-disc live album released by Norwegian alternative rock band Kaizers Orchestra, on 6 March 2006. It features their recorded concert performance at Vega, a concert hall in Copenhagen, Denmark, on 6 October 2005. It was originally meant to be released alongside the DVD recording of the same concert, Viva La Vega, but the release of the DVD was delayed until later that year.

== Track listing ==
Lyrics and music by Janove Ottesen, unless otherwise noted.

=== Disc one ===
1. "KGB"
2. "Delikatessen" (Delicatessen)
3. "Knekker deg til sist" (Break You in the End)
4. "Hevnervals" (Avenger's waltz)
5. "Container" (Dumpster) (Geir Zahl)
6. "Señor Flamingos adieu" (Instrumental)
7. "Blitzregn baby" (Blitz rain baby)
8. "Bøn fra helvete" (Prayer from Hell) (Ottesen/Zahl)
9. "Mann mot mann" (Man against Man)
10. "Kontroll på kontinentet" (Control over the Continent)
11. "Christiania" (Christiania)
12. "På ditt skift" (On Your Shift)
13. "Dr. Mowinckel" (Zahl)
14. "Di Grind" (Your Gate)
15. "Dieter Meyers Inst." (Dieter Meyer's Institution)

=== Disc two ===
1. "Evig pint" (Eternally Tormented)
2. "Ompa til du dør" (Dance 'till you Die)
3. "Maestro"
4. "Mr. Kaizer, hans Constanze og meg" (Mr. Kaizer, his Constanze and I)
5. "Sigøynerblod" (Gypsy Blood) (Ottesen/Zahl)
6. "Bak et halleluja" (Behind a Hallelujah)
7. "Resistansen" (The Resistance)
8. "170"
9. "Die Polizei" (The Police)

== Charts ==
=== Weekly charts ===
Chart (2006)	Peak position
Norwegian Albums (VG-lista)	8
