= Søvnløs (album) =

Studio album by Skambankt
- Released: 6 September 2010
- Recorded: 2010
- Studio: Athletic Sound, Halden, Norway
- Genre: Rock, hard rock
- Length: 36:45
- Label: Columbia Records
- Producer: Terje Winterstø Røthing, Tollak Friestad

Skambankt chronology
Hardt Regn (2009)	Søvnløs (2010)	Sirene (2014)

Søvnløs is the fourth studio album by Norwegian hard rock band Skambankt. It was recorded in February 2010 at Athletic Sound in Halden, and mixed by Jørgen Træen in Bergen. The working title "Åndelig terror" ("Spiritual Terror") stemmed from a quote by a senior citizen when she was presented with a sample of Skambankt's music. The final title "Søvnløs" ("Sleepless"), however, was chosen because the album was recorded mostly late at night because this is the time when new ideas develop.

The first single Mantra was released on May 17, 2010.

== Track listing ==
1. Kaos, så inferno (Chaos, then inferno)
2. Jesus av vår tid (Jesus of our times)
3. Mantra
4. Amnesti (Amnesty)
5. En lang strek (A long line)
6. Nattergal (Nightingale)
7. Født på ny (Born again)
8. Berlin
9. Kvelertak! (Stranglehold!)
10. Retrett (Retreat)

== Chart ==
Chart (2010)	Peak position
Norwegian Albums (VG-lista)	2
