= Live i Oslo Spektrum =

Live album by Kaizers Orchestra
- Released: 11 November 2011
- Recorded: Oslo Spektrum, Oslo, Norway, 9 April 2011
- Genre: Rock
- Label: Kaizerecords
- Producer: Janove Ottesen

Kaizers Orchestra chronology
| Violeta Violeta Vol. II (2011) | Live i Oslo Spektrum (2011) | Violeta Violeta Vol. III (2012) |

Live i Oslo Spektrum is a live album released on CD, DVD and Blu-ray featuring Norwegian alternative rock band Kaizers Orchestra. It features their concert at Oslo Spektrum in Oslo, Norway on 9 April 2011, the official celebration of Kaizers Orchestra's tenth anniversary. The album was released on 11 November 2011 (coinciding with the release date of their eighth studio album, Violeta Violeta Vol. II, and the stage premiere of their musical, Sonny). The live CD of the same concert, bundled with both releases, omits a certain number of songs due to capacity constraints.

== Track listing ==
Lyrics for all songs are in the Norwegian language. All songs written by Janove Ottesen, except where noted.

=== DVD/Blu-ray ===
1. Begravelsespolka
2. Delikatessen
3. Djevelens orkester
4. Señor Torpedo
5. Veterans klage
6. Sigøynerblod
7. Resistansen
8. Philemon Arthur & The Dung
9. Femtakt Filosofi
10. Din kjole lukter bensin, mor
11. En for orgelet, en for meg
12. Diamant til kull
13. Psycho under min hatt
14. Svarte katter & flosshatter
15. Hjerteknuser
16. Sju bøtter tårer er nok, Beatrice
17. Ompa til du dør
18. Bøn fra helvete (Ottesen/Geir Zahl)
19. Kontroll på kontinentet
20. Maestro
21. KGB
22. Dieter Meyers Inst.
23. Die Polizei

=== CD ===
1. Djevelens orkester
2. Señor Torpedo
3. Veterans klage
4. Philemon Arthur & The Dung
5. Femtakt filosofi
6. Din kjole lukter bensin, mor
7. En for orgelet, en for meg
8. Diamant til kull
9. Psycho under min hatt
10. Svarte katter & flosshatter
11. Hjerteknuser
12. Sju bøtter tårer er nok, Beatrice
13. Ompa til du dør
14. Maestro
15. KGB
16. Dieter Meyers Inst.
17. Die Polizei
