= Maestro (EP) =

2005 EP by Kaizers Orchestra

EP by Kaizers Orchestra
- Released: 1 August 2005
- Label: Kaizerecords

Maestro is a single/extended play (EP) by the Norwegian rock band Kaizers Orchestra. It was released on 1 August 2005 by Kaizerecords.

AllMusic rated it four and a half stars and noted, "English-speaking audiences don't need to understand a lick of Norwegian to identify with Maestro, as it sets a mood so universal in its volatility that even the most xenophobic listener will have no choice but to hit repeat over and over."

== Track listing ==
1. "Maestro"
2. "På ditt skift"
3. "D-Dagen"
4. "Sorti"
