= Ompa til du dør =

Studio album by Kaizers Orchestra
- Released: 1 September 2001
- Studio: Duper Studio (Bergen)
- Genre: Alternative rock; cabaret; gypsy punk; folk
- Length: 43:49
- Label: Broiler Farm
- Producer: Jørgen Træen, Stian Carstensen, Janove Ottesen, Geir Zahl

Kaizers Orchestra chronology
Kaizers Orchestra EP (2000)	Ompa til du dør (2001)	Evig pint (2003)

Singles from Ompa til du dør
- 1. "Kontroll på kontinentet"

Professional ratings
Review scores
Source	Rating
Allmusic	4.5/5 stars
Sputnikmusic	4/5 stars

Ompa til du dør (Dance 'till you die) is the debut album by Norwegian alternative rock band Kaizers Orchestra. It was released on 1 September 2001. In early 2002, Ompa til du dør won the "Best Album Award" at Spellemannprisen. In 2003, the album had sold around 100,000 copies worldwide.

== Track listing ==
Lyrics and music by Janove Ottesen, unless otherwise noted.

Ompa til du dør track listing
No.	Title	Music	Length
1.	"Kontroll på kontinentet" (Control over the Continent)	Janove Ottesen	4:03
2.	"Ompa til du dør" (Dance 'till you Die)	Ottesen	5:06
3.	"Bøn fra helvete" (Prayer from Hell)	Ottesen, Zahl	4:02
4.	"170"	Ottesen	4:15
5.	"Rullett" (Roulette)	Zahl	2:50
6.	"Dr. Mowinckel" (Dr. Mowinckel)	Zahl	3:13
7.	"Fra sjåfør til passasjer" (From Driver to Passenger)	Ottesen	5:02
8.	"Resistansen" (The Resistance)	Ottesen	3:02
9.	"Dekk bord" (Set the Table)	Ottesen, Zahl	3:38
10.	"Bak et halleluja" (Behind a Hallelujah)	Ottesen	1:59
11.	"Bris" (Breeze)	Ottesen	3:37
12.	"Mr. Kaizer, hans Constanze og meg" (Mr. Kaizer, his Constanze and I)	Ottesen	3:29

== Personnel ==
=== Kaizers Orchestra ===
- Janove Ottesen – vocals, back-up choir, guitar, piano, marimba
- Geir Zahl – guitar, vocals, back-up choir
- Terje Winterstø Røthing – guitar, back-up choir, mandolin, tambourin
- Rune Solheim – drums, percussion
- Helge Risa – pump organ, piano
- Jon Sjøen – double bass, electric bass

=== Additional musicians ===
- Stian Carstensen – banjo, kaval
- Jan Kåre Hystad – Saxophone

=== Technical ===
- Jørgen Træen – producer, mixing, recording
- Stian Carstensen – producer
- Janove Ottesen – producer
- Geir Zahl – producer
- Audun Strype – mastering

== Charts ==
=== Weekly charts ===
Weekly chart performance for Ompa til du dør
Chart (2001–2002)	Peak position
Danish Albums (Hitlisten)	22
Norwegian Albums (VG-lista)	1
