= Viva la Vega =

Viva La Vega

Video by Kaizers Orchestra
- Released: 24 April 2006 (EU); 27 May 2006 (NO)
- Recorded: Vega, Copenhagen, Denmark, 6 October 2005
- Genre: Rock
- Length: 240 minutes
- Label: Kaizerecords, Universal Music Group
- Director: Inge von Schreuder and Vegard Berget
- Producer: Amazon film

Viva La Vega is a Live DVD featuring the Norwegian alternative rock band Kaizers Orchestra produced by the Norwegian company Amazon Film. It features their concert at Vega in Copenhagen, Denmark on 6 October 2005, as well as documentaries, music videos, a biography, and stills. The DVD features all the songs Kaizers recorded in 2005, whether as part of the concert itself or as background music for the extras.

== DVD Material ==
=== Live at Vega ===
(by Chapter)

1. KGB
2. Delikatessen
3. Knekker deg til sist
4. Hevnervals
5. Container
6. Señor Flamingos adieu
7. Blitzregn baby
8. Bøn fra helvete
9. Mann mot mann
10. Kontroll på kontinentet
11. Christiania
12. På ditt skift
13. Dr. Mowinckel
14. Di grind
15. Dieter Meyers Inst.
16. Evig pint
17. Ompa til du dør
18. Maestro
19. Mr. Kaizer, hans Constanze og meg
20. Sigøynerblod
21. Bak et halleluja
22. Resistansen
23. 170
24. Die Polizei

=== Extras ===
- Maestro: Making of the Album
- Tour Tull: Socks, Suits, & Rock ’n’ Roll
- Prekestolen/Pulpit Rock: February 2005, Behind the Scenes
- Biography
- Stills and slides

=== Music Videos ===
- Maestro
- Knekker deg til sist
- Evig pint
- Kontroll på kontinentet

== Navigation ==
The main menu of the DVD is set up with symbols along the objects around the pump organ Mr. Omen Kaizer is playing.

The !—helmet; The concert at Vega
The Treble Clef—music sheets; Chapter selection
The Star—movie projector; Music videos
Heart symbol—candles/gun; Something very random; click for yourself...
Crowbars—side of the pump organ; Extras section
Three circles—dials on the pump organ; Subtitles selection for the Making of Maestro and Prekestolen documentaries (Norwegian, English, German)
Music Notes—along the keys of the pump organ; Sound selection (Dolby Digital 2.0 and 5.1)
