= Maestro (Kaizers Orchestra album) =

2005 studio album by Kaizers Orchestra

Studio album by Kaizers Orchestra
- Released: 15 August 2005
- Recorded: February–March 2005
- Studio: Duper Studio (Bergen)
- Genre: Alternative rock
- Length: 45:20
- Label: Kaizerecords; Universal
- Producer: Jørgen Træen; Janove Ottesen

Kaizers Orchestra chronology
| Evig pint (2003) | Maestro (2005) | Live at Vega (2006) |

Singles from Maestro
- 1. "Maestro"; 2. "Knekker deg til sist"

Professional ratings
Review scores
| Source | Rating |
|---|---|
| Panorama | 5/6 stars |
| VG | 5/6 stars |

Maestro is the third studio album by Norwegian alternative rock band Kaizers Orchestra. It was released on 15 August 2005 by Kaizerecords and Universal Music Group. It was later released as a 2-CD limited edition with bonus tracks and videos.

Like the two previous albums, the lyrics of the compositions are stories that all relate to the theme of the album, this time in a post-war mental hospital owned by a man called Dieter Meyer.

The first single, "Maestro", was released on 4 June 2005. A video for "Maestro" was also recorded (in Germany).

== Background ==
The first song that was written for the then-untitled third album, "Dieter Meyers Inst.", frontman Janove Ottesen wrote on the pump organ in Café Mono, Oslo. The song is about a man who willingly commits himself to a mental asylum, which set the tone for the overall theme of the album. In January 2004, a 30-track demo was recorded, which the band pitched to various record labels. They eventually landed a contract with Universal Germany.

On 27 February 2004, during a concert at the Rockefeller Music Hall in Oslo, a new song called "Medisin og psykiatri" was played. Also, the song "Tokyo Ice til Clementine" was played once at an acoustic session for the Dutch Pinkpop Festival. Later in 2005, two more new songs, "Delikatessen" and "Maestro", were played at a German musical event called Eine Nacht in Bochum. The event was broadcast on the German radio station 1LIVE. "Medisin og psykiatri" was eventually scrapped from both set lists and the album.

== Track listing ==
Lyrics and music by Janove Ottesen, unless otherwise noted.

Maestro track listing
| No. | Title | Music | Length |
|---|---|---|---|
| 1. | "KGB" | Janove Ottesen | 4:13 |
| 2. | "Maestro" | Ottesen | 4:40 |
| 3. | "Knekker deg til sist" (Break You in the End) | Ottesen | 3:39 |
| 4. | "Señor Flamingos Adieu" | Ottesen | 0:45 |
| 5. | "Blitzregn baby" (Blitz Rain baby) | Ottesen | 3:01 |
| 6. | "Dieter Meyers Inst." (Dieter Meyer's Institution) | Ottesen | 5:35 |
| 7. | "Christiania" | Ottesen | 3:45 |
| 8. | "Delikatessen" (The Delicatesse) | Ottesen | 3:07 |
| 9. | "Jævel av en tango" (Hell of a tango) | Ottesen | 4:01 |
| 10. | "Papa har lov" (Papa Has Permission) | Geir Zahl | 3:38 |
| 11. | "Auksjon (i Dieter Meyers hall)" (Auction (In Dieter Meyer's Hall)) | Zahl | 4:19 |
| 12. | "På ditt skift" (On Your Shift) | Ottesen | 4:36 |

Limited edition – disc 2
| No. | Title | Music | Length |
|---|---|---|---|
| 1. | "Action" | Joachim Nielsen | 4:09 |
| 2. | "Kalifornia" | Zahl | 3:07 |
| 3. | "Tokyo Ice til Clementine" (Tokyo Ice for Clementine) | Ottesen | 2:42 |

Also on the second disc of the limited edition are the music videos for "Maestro" and "Knekker Deg til Sist", along with the "Kaizers Orchestra Player", a custom-built music player with downloadable content available.

== Personnel ==
=== Kaizers Orchestra ===
- Janove Ottesen – vocals
- Geir Zahl – guitar
- Terje Winterstø Røthing – guitar
- Øyvind Storesund – double bass
- Rune Solheim – drums
- Helge Risa – pump organ

=== Additional musicians ===
- Trifon Trifonov – Saxophone (1, 2)
- Filip Ankov Simeonov – Clarinet (2, 6, 8), Trumpet (2, 6, 8)
- Øyvind Husebø – Trumpet (2, 10)
- Stian Carstensen – Accordion (6, 9), Banjo (9)
- Rebecca Cherry – Violin (6)
- Chiori Suzuki – Violin (6)
- Berend Mulder – Viola (6)
- Siri Hilmen – Cello (6)
- Martin Holmes – Backing vocals (9)
- Tor Erik Hellesen – Trombone (10)
- Gunnar Hågbo – Saxophone (10)

=== Technical ===
- Jørgen Træen – producer, mixing
- Janove Ottesen – producer
- Bjørn Engelman – mastering

== Charts ==
=== Weekly charts ===
Weekly chart performance for Maestro
| Chart (2005) | Peak position |
|---|---|
| Danish Albums (Hitlisten) | 3 |
| Norwegian Albums (VG-lista) | 1 |
