= Evig pint =

Studio album by Kaizers Orchestra
- Released: 3 February 2003
- Recorded: November–December 2002
- Studio: Duper Studio (Bergen)
- Genre: Alternative rock
- Length: 44:35
- Label: BroilerFarm
- Producer: Jørgen Træen, Janove Ottesen

Kaizers Orchestra chronology
Ompa til du dør (2001)	Evig pint (2003)	Maestro (2005)

Professional ratings
Review scores
Source	Rating
Allmusic	4/5 stars

Evig pint (English: Eternally Tormented) is the second studio album by Norwegian alternative rock band Kaizers Orchestra, released on 3 February 2003.

== Background ==
After the release of the best-selling Ompa til du dør, and the EPs Død manns tango and Mann mot mann, the band started writing new material. In February 2002, the band debuted the song "Salt og pepper" and continued to play it throughout 2002. Nothing new surfaced until the band played "Djevelens orkester" once in fall 2002. Shortly after, in November, the recording sessions for the new album started. Nearing the end of 2002, Kaizers Orchestra spoke about the new album. It was to be called Evig pint, and was due for release on 3 February 2003.

The album art features the band's organist Helge Risa in his trademark gas mask before a dark brown background.

== Promotion ==
In early 2003, the band released "Di grind" as a free download, exclusively on their website. They premiered the song "Evig pint" at the Spellemannsprisen award show (Norwegian Grammy Award).

== Style and lyrical themes ==
Evig pint has a generally darker atmosphere than its predecessor, both musically and lyrically. A majority of the songs are about torment of the soul, heaven, hell, death and loneliness.

The lyrics also relate to each other to a lesser extent than Ompa til du dør. The band has said that the songs are more individual than their older compositions.

== Track listing ==
Lyrics and music by Janove Ottesen, unless otherwise noted.

Evig pint track listing
No.	Title	Music	Length
1.	"Di grind" (Your Gate)	Janove Ottesen	4:09
2.	"Hevnervals" (Avenger's Waltz)	Ottesen	2:50
3.	"Evig pint" (Eternally Tormented)	Ottesen	3:54
4.	"De involverte" ((Those Involved))	Ottesen	4:18
5.	"Djevelens orkester" (The Devil’s Orchestra)	Ottesen	3:50
6.	"Container" (Dumpster)	Geir Zahl	2:20
7.	"Naade" (Mercy)	Zahl	1:32
8.	"Min kvite russer" (White Russian)	Ottesen	4:34
9.	"Veterans klage" (Veteran's Lament)	Ottesen	1:27
10.	"Til depotet" (To the Depot)	Ottesen	2:43
11.	"Salt & pepper" (Salt and Pepper)	Ottesen	4:43
12.	"Drøm hardt (Requiem part I)" (Dream Hard)	Zahl	8:25

== Charts ==
=== Weekly charts ===
Weekly chart performance for Evig pint
Chart (2003)	Peak position
Danish Albums (Hitlisten)	30
Norwegian Albums (VG-lista)	1
