= Maskineri =

Studio album by Kaizers Orchestra
- Released: 18 February 2008
- Recorded: November–December 2007
- Studio: Planet Roc (Berlin, Germany)
- Genre: Alternative rock
- Length: 43:15
- Label: Petroleum Records, Sony BMG
- Producer: Mark Howard, Janove Ottesen

Kaizers Orchestra chronology
Live at Vega (2006)	Maskineri (2008)	250 prosent (2008)

Singles from Maskineri
- 1. "Enden av november" 2. "9 mm" 3. "Apokalyps meg"

Professional ratings
Review scores
Source	Rating
Aftenposten	5/6 stars
Dagbladet	5/6 stars

Maskineri (Machinery) is the fourth studio album by Norwegian alternative rock band Kaizers Orchestra, released on 18 February 2008. Recorded and mixed during November and December 2007, the album was released on the independent label Petroleum Records in Norway on 18 February 2008 and on Sony BMG in international territories on a later date.

On 17 December 2007 the first single, "Enden av november", was released on radio, their MySpace and iTunes. The same day, the first in a series of videos documenting the making of Maskineri was uploaded to YouTube.

== Background ==
Early on, the band stated that with Maskineri they wanted to go in a new direction, not only with the songs, but also with how the album was to be made and whom to make it with. The band had recorded their three previous studio albums at Duper Studios in Bergen with the help of producer Jørgen Træen, whom they stated was the "best producer in the world." However, when they were approached by sound engineer and producer Mark Howard through MySpace, they came to an agreement, and Howard was hired as the producer for the new album. Howard had earlier mixed the audio for R.E.M. and Tom Waits.

== Critical reception ==
The album was received well by the three biggest newspapers in Norway, Aftenposten, VG and Dagbladet, which all gave the album a 5/6 score. Most music magazines and websites also followed up with good scores. However, Danish music magazine Gaffa gave the album 3/6, saying that the band "has lost their interest and belief in their own abilities".

== Commercial performance ==
Since it was released on a Monday, Maskineri didn't enter the Norwegian Topp 40 Album charts until next week. The album made its debut on the charts in the coveted number-one spot.

On 20 June 2008, the album was confirmed to have reached the platinum mark, 30,000 sales. The band received a commemorative framed platinum disc at the Topp 20 Supershow in Oslo on the very same day.

== Track listing ==
Lyrics and music by Janove Ottesen, unless otherwise noted.

Maskineri track listing
No.	Title	Music	Length
1.	"Moment" (Momentum)	Janove Ottesen	2:53
2.	"Apokalyps meg" (Apocalypse Me)	Ottesen	4:26
3.	"Den andre er meg" (The Other One is Me)	Ottesen	4:13
4.	"Bastard sønn" (Bastard Son)	Ottesen	3:56
5.	"Maskineri" (Machinery)	Ottesen	4:07
6.	"Toxic blod" (Toxic Blood)	Geir Zahl	2:57
7.	"9 mm"	Ottesen	3:07
8.	"Volvo i Mexico" (Volvo in Mexico)	Zahl	3:15
9.	"Enden av november" (The End of November)	Ottesen	4:20
10.	"Med en gong eg når bånn" (Once I Reach the Bottom)	Ottesen	4:07
11.	"Kaizers 115. drøm" (Kaizer's 115th dream)	Ottesen, Zahl	3:14
12.	"Ond sirkel" (Vicious Cycle)	Zahl	2:24

Bonus track on vinyl edition
No.	Title	Music	Length
13.	"Romantisk salme i F-dur" (Romantic Psalm in F Major)	Ottesen	5:38

iTunes Store bonus tracks
No.	Title	Music	Length
13.	"Du og meg Lou" (You and Me, Lou)	Ottesen	3:29

== Personnel ==
=== Kaizers Orchestra ===
- Janove Ottesen - vocals
- Geir Zahl - guitars
- Terje Winterstø Røthing – guitars
- Øyvind Storesund - double bass
- Helge Risa - keys, marimba
- Rune Solheim - drums

=== Additional musicians ===
- Ragnhild Winterstø Røthing - vocals on track 3
- Gal Bar-Adon - Trombone
- Mathieu Pé - Trumpet, flugelhorn
- Florent Mannant - Tenor, Baritone saxophone
- Andreas Pfaff - Strings

=== Technical ===
- Mark Howard - producer, recording, mixing
- Janove Ottesen – producer
- Matt Serrechio – mixing assistant
- Gavin Lurssen – mastering

=== Artwork ===
- Bjørn-Harald Myhre - art director & photography

== Charts ==
=== Weekly charts ===
Weekly chart performance for Maskineri
Chart (2008)	Peak position
Danish Albums (Hitlisten)	9
Norwegian Albums (VG-lista)	1
