= Janove Ottesen =

Norwegian musician (born 1975)

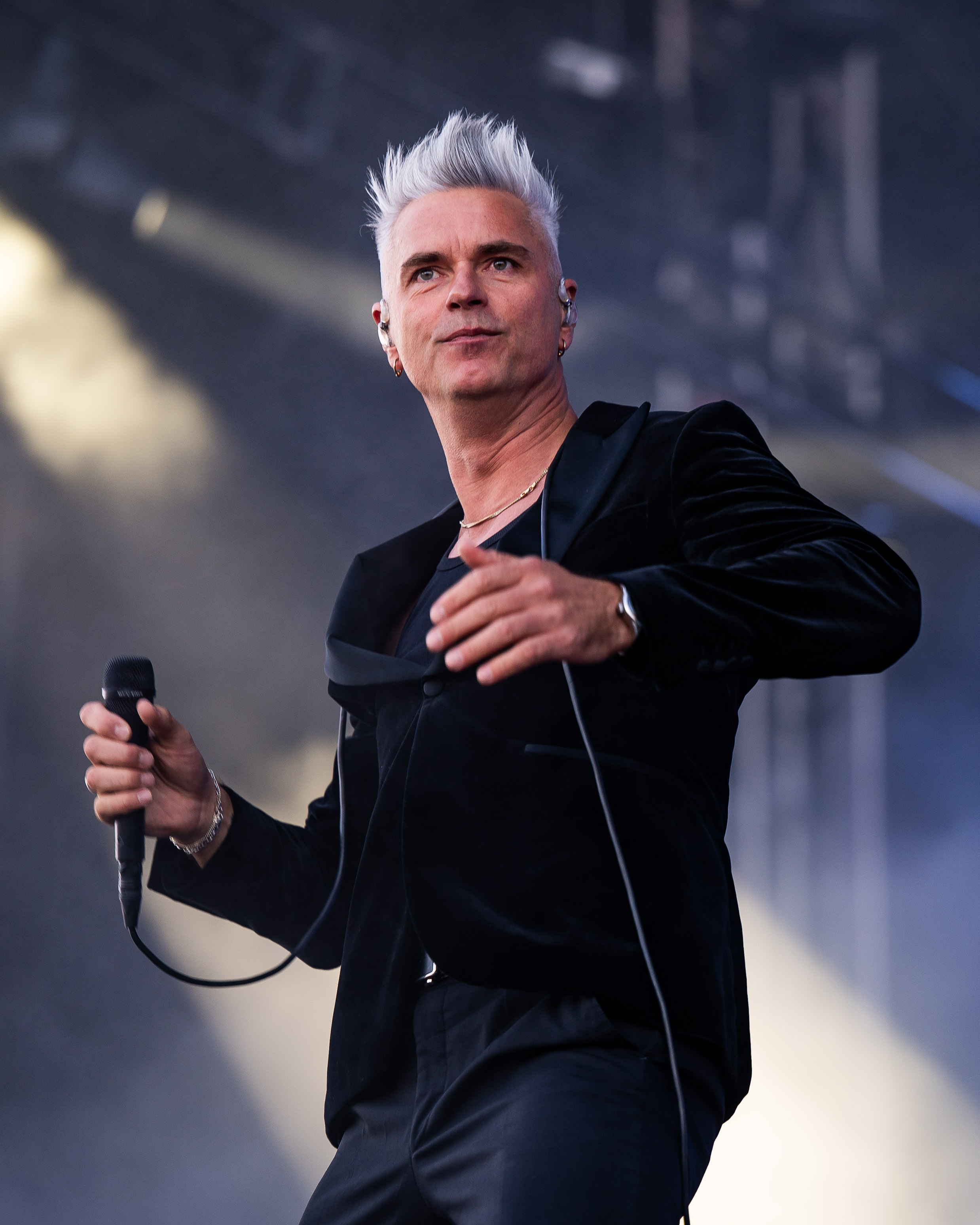
- Janove Ottesen performing at Tons of Rock with Kaizers Orchestra in 2025

Background information
- Also known as: Janove "The Jackal" Kaizer
- Born: 27 August 1975 (age 51); Stord Municipality, Norway
- Genres: Rock, Pop, Folk music
- Instruments: Vocals, Guitar, Oil barrel, Drums, Piano, Hammond, Glockenspiel, Percussion, Accordion, Horn

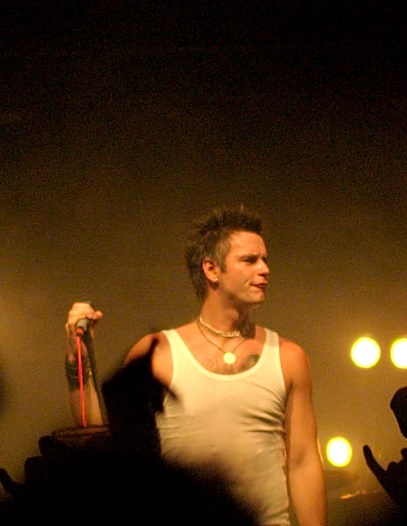
Performing with Kaizers Orchestra in Bremen in 2005

Janove Ottesen (born Jan Ove Ottesen, 27 August 1975) is a Norwegian musician, born in Stord Municipality, Hordaland county, Norway. He specializes in vocals, guitar and barrels, and is a leading member of the Norwegian band Kaizers Orchestra.

== History ==
=== Youth and first contact with music ===
Bryne, where Ottesen grew up, had few activities available at the time other than football, so he was given a guitar by his grandmother when he was a child. Ottesen and his friend Geir Zahl began writing music in his cellar, recording their music on a cheap tape recorder.

The partnership between Ottesen and Zahl eventually evolved into the band Blod, Snått og Juling. In 1994 they produced their first studio album En glad tunnel, which only sold 50 copies. They made a more serious attempt with better studio equipment for their second album, but this still only managed to sell around 100 copies.

=== gnom and Kaizers Orchestra ===
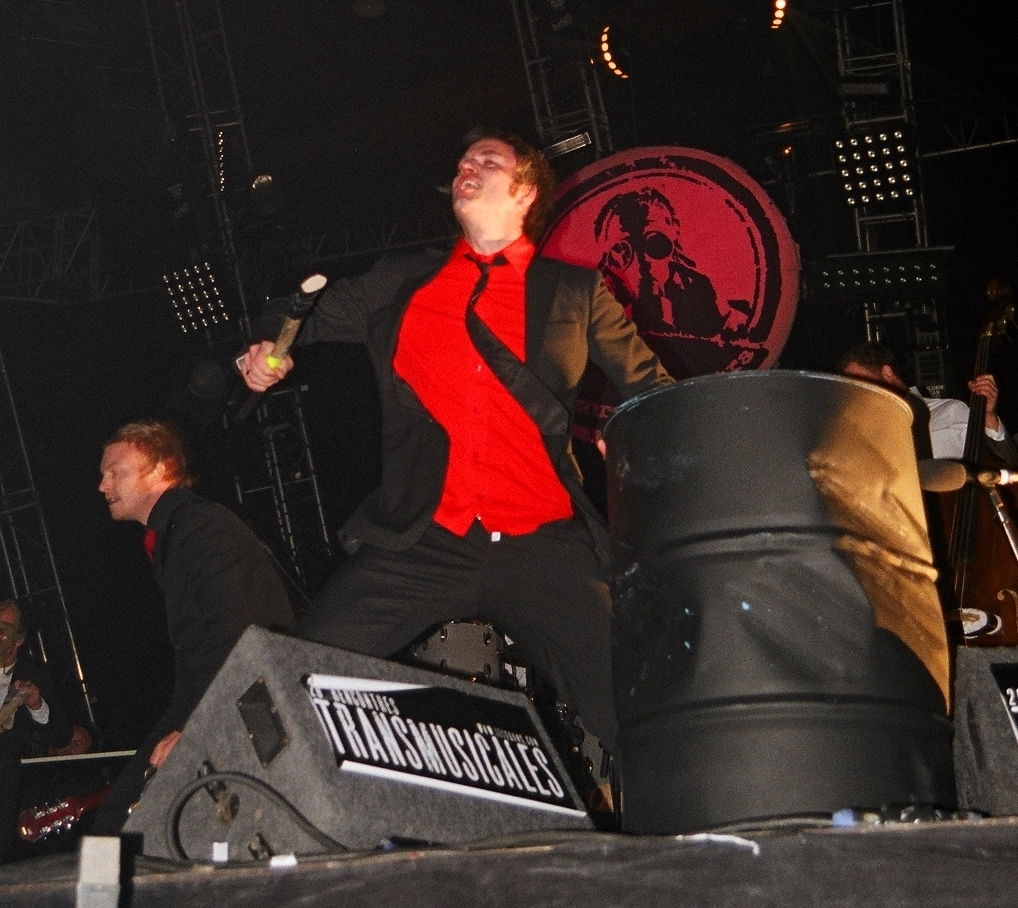
Janove Ottesen, Kaizers Orchestra at Trans Musicales 2004 in Rennes

Ottesen moved to Bergen in 1995 to study. In 1996 he joined the army, but soon after moved back to Bergen and became a music teacher. Upon his return Ottesen and Geir formed a new band gnom. They released the album Mys in 1998, but it sold poorly. After gnom's dissolution, the pair finally found critical success in forming the band Kaizers Orchestra.

=== Solo career ===
After two albums had been released by Kaizers Orchestra, Janove decided to launch a parallel solo career while working on a third album Maestro (released in 2005). His 2004 solo album, Francis' Lonely Nights, is entirely in English and contains 12 songs, two of which had their music videos filmed in Scandinavia.

In September 2015 Ottesen announced he was returning to the mainstream music industry under the artist name Janove. His first single, "Regnbuen Treffer Oss Ikkje Lenger" ("The Rainbow Doesn't Hit Us Anymore"), premiered on Spellemannprisen on 30 January 2016 as he performed it live for the first time. He says his music has influences of R'n'B, hip hop and rap music. The lyrics are also more modern than the fans might have gotten used to with Kaizers Orchestra. The first album of his new solo career, Artisten og Marlene, came out in 2017, followed closely by his 2018 release Hengtmann, which utilized songs left over, or developed after writing the former album.

After touring with his solo band Janove did a stripped-down tour consisting of just himself, with emphasis on unique set and lighting design. This was paired with the release of an EP, Spindelvevriff, in late 2018. He continued with this concept of a stripped-down tour in 2020, when he released another EP he had written while in lockdown during the COVID-19 pandemic, Barrikadeballader.

In September 2019 he released his single "Det Sorte Karneval", the title track for an album of the same name, originally slated for release in the fall of 2020. A second single was released before the 2020 pandemic, but once larger music venues stopped hosting concerts the decision was made to delay the album release by one year to allow for a large tour. On December 24, 2020 Janove released two more singles for the upcoming album.

=== Career as a producer and other music ===
In 2007, Kaizers decided to take a break for the majority of the year, only writing up demos for their fourth album and playing three concerts (including opening the German art expo Documenta festival). Janove took this opportunity to write music for Det Tusende Hjertet, a family musical which opened in November 2007. In August 2007 he revealed that his next side project will not be a solo album, and that he has assembled another band (like fellow Kaizer bandmate Terje Winterstø Røthing and his band Skambankt). Nothing is known about the status of this project.

Aside from his work with Kaizers and as an independent artist, he has also acted as producer for multiple albums, working with various artists with various styles, including Micke From Sweden (folk), Britt-Synnøve Johansen (tango), and The Brigade (Americana). He also participated in Geir "Uncle Deadly" Zahl's album Monkey Do, released on 1 February 2010. In 2022, Janove produced Morten Abel's album, Engelig Seier.

== Personal life ==
Ottesen is married and has two children. They live in Tananger.

== Discography ==
=== Blod, Snått & Juling ===
- Ein Glad Tunnel (released in 50 copies in 1994, only on cassette)
- Sympatiske Fisk (released in 100 copies in 1995, only on cassette)
- Unreleased cassette (1996)

=== gnom ===
- Mys (1998)
- Unreleased album (1999)

=== Kaizers Orchestra ===
==== Albums ====
- Ompa til du dør (2001)
- Evig pint (2003)
- Maestro (2005)
- Maskineri (2008)
- Våre demoner (2009)
- Violeta Violeta (2011/2012)
  - Violeta Violeta Vol. I (Jan. 2011)
  - Violeta Violeta Vol. II (Nov. 2011)
  - Violeta Violeta Vol. III (Nov. 2012)

==== EPs, live recordings, and singles ====
- Gul EP (2000)
- Død manns tango EP (2001)
- Mann mot mann EP (2002)
- The Gypsy Finale (2004)
- Maestro EP (2005)
- Live at Vega (2006)
- 250 prosent (2008)
- Live i Oslo Spektrum (2011)
- Stjerner i posisjon (2013)
- Dine gamle dager er nå (2023)
- Kaleidoskophimmel (2023)
- This is the Kaizer Family! (2024)

=== Solo ===
==== Albums ====
- Francis' Lonely Nights (2004)
- Artisten og Marlene (2017)
- Hengtmann (2018)
- Det sorte karneval (2021)
- Fullmånehymner (2022)

==== EPs ====
- Spindelvevriff (2018)
- Barrikadeballader (2020)

==== Singles ====
- Regnbuen treffer oss ikkje lenger (2016)
- Verden går til helvete, tralala (2016)
- Aldri la de tru de er bedre enn deg (2016)
- Marlene (2016)
- Hengtmann (2017)
- Våpen (feat. Ane Brun) (2017)
- Bak en sky heim (2018)
- En større dag (2018)
- Det sorte karneval (2019)
- Verdens lengste farvel (2020)
- Opp Av Ruiner (2020)
- En rik brønn som lyger (2020)
- Synd at synd går i arv (2020)
- Blomster frå ei grav (2021)
- Lev Seint, Lev Sant (2022)
- Carnaby Jul (2022)
- Du mangler (2025)
- Min melodi blå (2026)

=== Musical theatre & orchestral ===
- Det Tusende Hjertet (2007)
- Pirater! (with Geir Zahl, Unreleased, 2011)
- Sonny (Unreleased, 2011)
- Do You Love Me (Collaboration with Stavanger Symphony Orchestra, 2012)
- Peter Pan (Unreleased, 2016)
- The Mute (collaboration with Stavanger Symphony Orchestra, performed 2018, recording released 2019)
- Violeta Violeta (Musical theatre adaptation of Kaizers' trilogy, with Geir Zahl, in development)
