= Kaizers Orchestra =

Norwegian alternative rock band

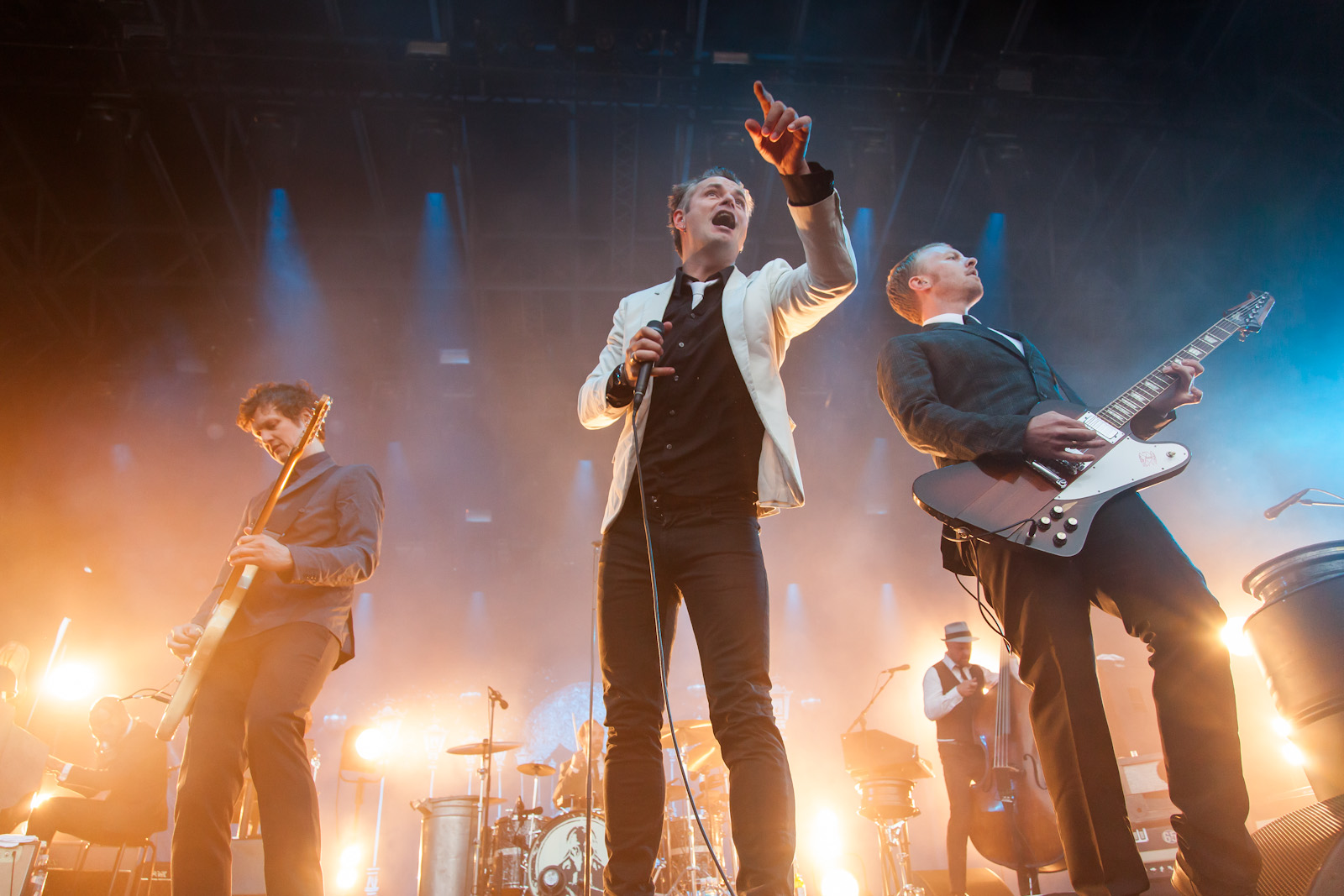
- Kaizers Orchestra performing at the Odderøya Live Festival, 2012

Background information
- Origin: Bryne, Norway
- Genres: Alternative rock; dark cabaret
- Years active: 2000–2013; 2022–present
- Labels: BroilerFarm; Sony BMG; Universal Germany; Kaizerecords; Petroleum Records
- Members: Janove Ottesen; Geir Zahl; Terje Winterstø Røthing; Rune Solheim; Helge Risa; Øyvind Storesund
- Past members: Jon Sjøen (2000–2003)
- Website: www.kaizers.no

Kaizers Orchestra is a Norwegian alternative rock band formed in Bergen on 1 January 2000. They are notable for being among the first non-black-metal Norwegian artists singing in their native language to become popular beyond Scandinavia.

In 2012, the group announced that following a 2013 "Farewell Tour", they would take a long break. Their final concert was held on 14 September 2013 at DNB Arena in Stavanger, and was also streamed live online. In November 2022, following weeks of teasers and speculation, the band confirmed a reunion and comeback tour scheduled for 2023.

== History ==
=== Formation and early years (1995–2004) ===
In 1998, childhood friends Janove Ottesen and Geir Zahl released their only album by their band gnom called Mys. Of its 1000 copies, only 500 or so were sold the first year. However, they were known well in the area around Stavanger in Norway, having played as the local band Blod, snått & juling, and one of the songs they wrote after Mys called "Bastard" got good crowd response. A line from "Bastard" ("A certain Mr. Kaizer took me in/He is the proud owner of the world's heaviest siamese cat") and the song's overall crowd response became a source of inspiration for Ottesen, and after gnom dissolved after disappointing record sales, he formed Kaizers Orchestra.

In 2000, Kaizers Orchestra recorded the Kaizers Orchestra EP, containing four songs: "Bastard", "Bøn fra helvete", "Katastrofen" and "Dekk bord". During by:Larm, a Norwegian festival focusing on up-and-coming artists, the band's songs were played frequently on the radio. Kaizers Orchestra's sound and creative use of instruments was noticed by the small, Scandinavian label Broilerfarm. Their first album, Ompa til du dør, was released on this label in September 2001. It was critically acclaimed and became a success, first in Norway, later in Denmark and the Netherlands. The album won a Spellemannpris (Norwegian Grammy) for "Best Rock", as well as two Alarm-awards (underground version of Spellemannprisen). Ompa til du dør also made Kaizers Orchestra the highest-selling rock debut to be released in the Norwegian language. The second album, Evig pint, was released in February 2003.

=== Maestro, Vega, and a book (2005–2007) ===
The third album, Maestro, was released on 15 August 2005 in Norway and Europe. In connection with the release of Maestro, Kaizers Orchestra signed an international record deal with Universal Germany, taking them from one of the smallest labels to one of the biggest.

Their 5 and 6 October 2005 performances at Vega, in Copenhagen, Denmark, were recorded for a live DVD, titled Viva La Vega, and double CD, Live at Vega. A book by Geir Zahl's older brother Jan, called Kontroll på kontinentet was released 18 October 2006. It is close to 300 pages and include almost 150 pictures documenting the 2005 Maestro tour. In 2007, the members of Kaizers Orchestra took a break from playing live. All members (bar Helge) are involved in some sort of side project, and they concentrated on these in their break time. They only played three shows in 2007: one in Hungary, at the Sziget Festival, one in Norway, at Cementen, and finally at the German art expo Documenta.

=== Maskineri, 250 Prosent, and Våre Demoner (2007–2011) ===
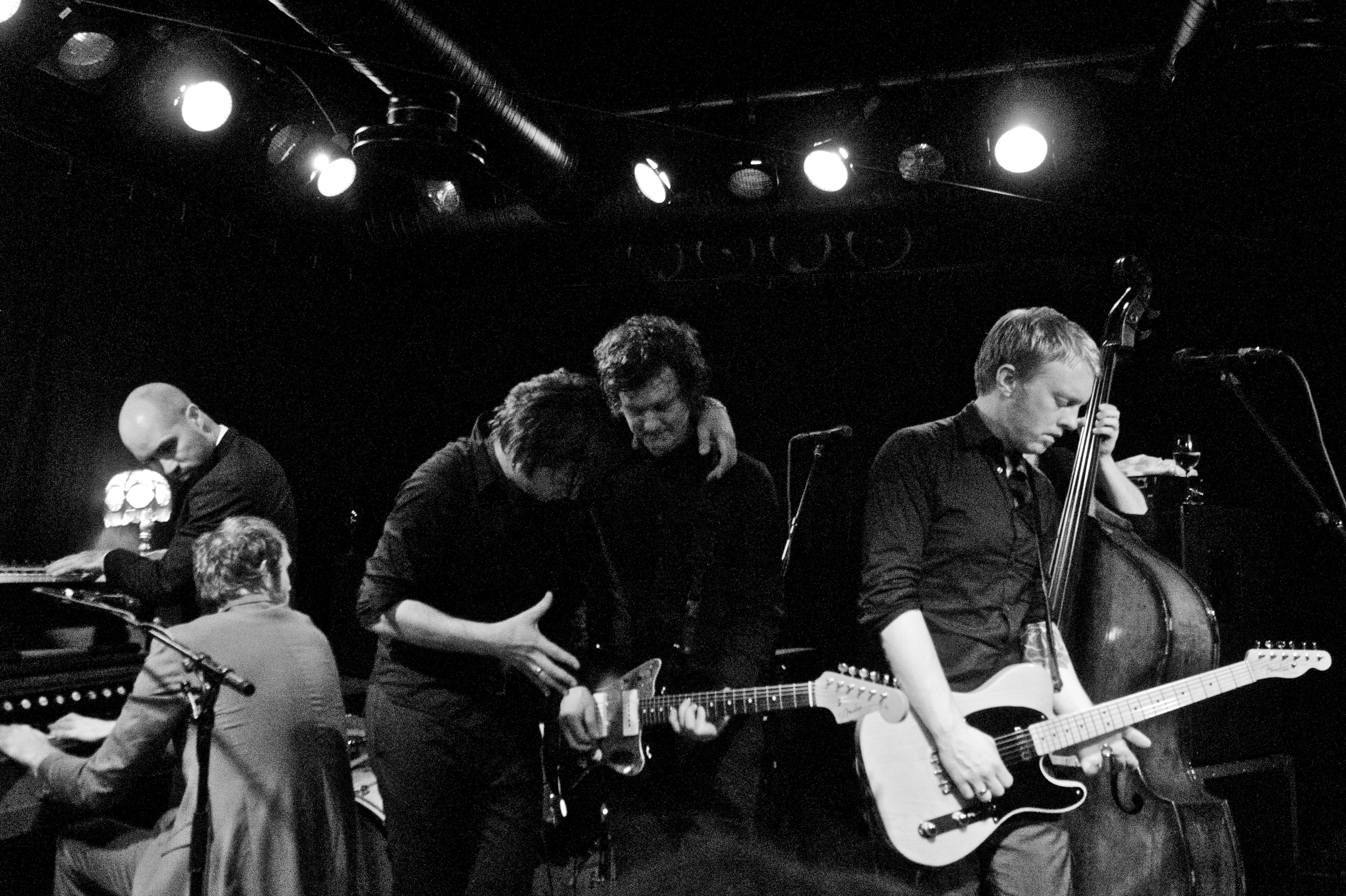
Kaizers Orchestra in May 2009

On September 6, 2006, the band released information about their upcoming fourth album. The album was recorded in Berlin, Germany, assisted by producer-engineer Mark Howard (producer). The audio mixing for the album was done in Los Angeles, California. The album title was revealed to be Maskineri in December 2007, and around the same time, the first single, "Enden av november", was released. The album was released on February 19, 2008, on Sony BMG. They claimed to have chosen the smaller label instead of working with Universal for more freedom.

On 12 December 2007, Kaizers Orchestra received "Bragdprisen" (Achievement Award) from the county of Rogaland, due to their efforts to promote their native Bryne dialect. Helge Risa was the only one available to show up at the award ceremony, as the rest of the band were busy doing the album mixing.

In February 2008, the band released their fourth album, and toured to support it, recording the audio of all the concerts. Not long after that, in fall 2008, they released a live album called 250 prosent. The live album consisted of what they thought were the best songs recorded while they were in Germany, Austria and Switzerland. The album was released primarily on vinyl, but it was made also available as a digital download through the iTunes Store. They supported the release of that album by a "rarities" tour, playing songs they rarely played live.

After that it was believed they were taking a break, for the members to work on their other projects and work on writing songs for the next album, but on 14 February 2009, they revealed that in January they had recorded several songs for a compilation album scheduled for release on April 20, which was then pushed back to April 27 for marketing reasons. The album, Våre demoner, consists of surplus material from each of their previous studio albums. On 18 December 2009, "Ompa til du dør" was voted as the best Norwegian song of the decade in a public poll on the website of NRK P3, one of the biggest radio stations in Norway. "Kontroll på kontinentet" and "Maestro" got third and fourth place in the same list. The band performed all three songs live on the radio after being announced as the winners.

At a press conference in August 2009, the band announced that they were working on a stage musical together with Tore Renberg (who wrote the stage play). It is named Sonny ("Maestro" abroad), and is based on the text universe and characters from the band's first three albums. Several of the songs Kaizers Orchestra recorded in 2010 were used in the piece. The musical premiered at the Rogaland Theatre November 11, 2011.

=== Violeta Violeta and hiatus (2009–2013) ===
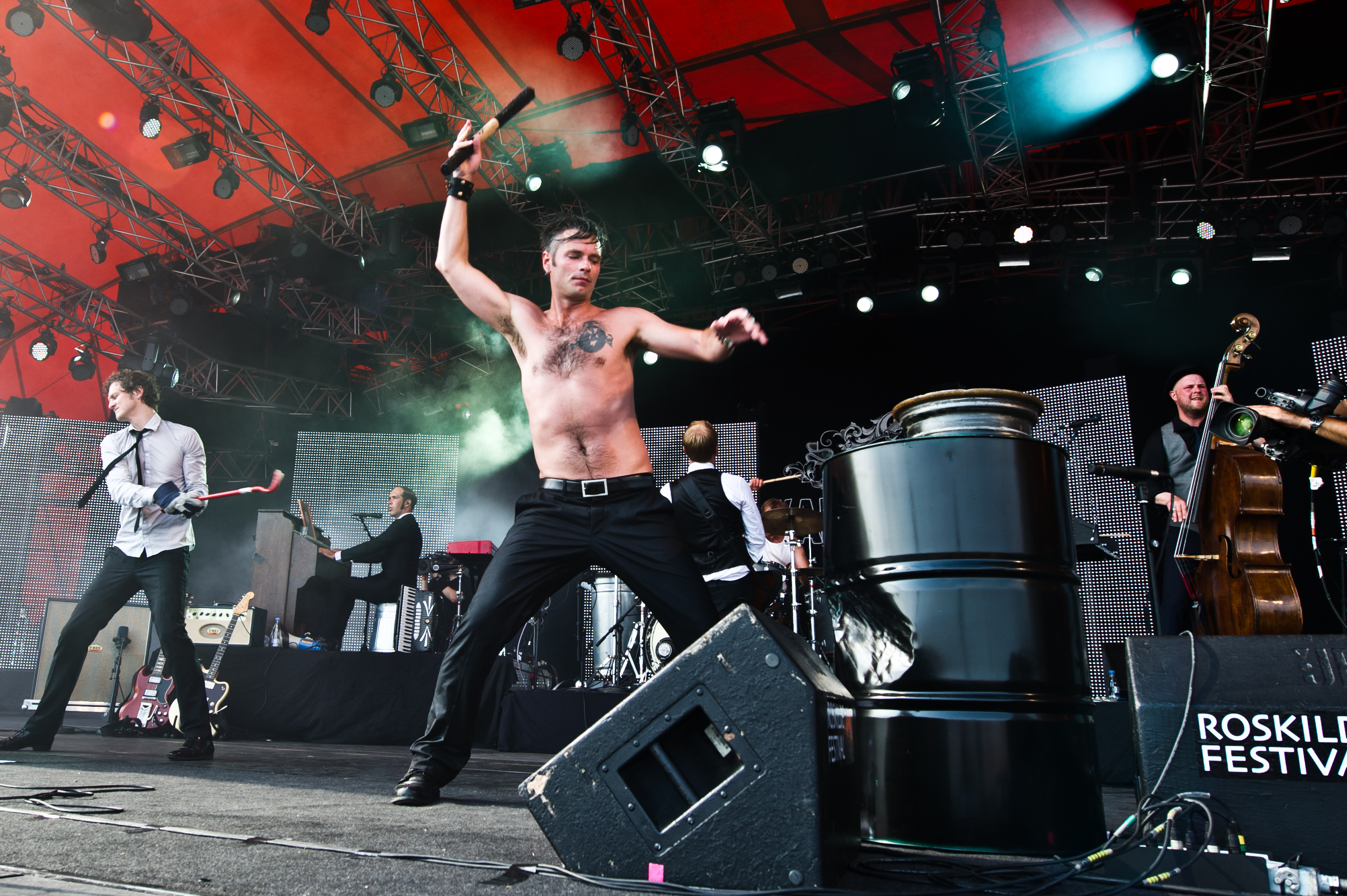
Kaizers Orchestra performing at Roskilde Festival on Orange Stage. July 2011.

In January 2010, the band performed new material as part of Eurosonic in the Netherlands. In February, they announced the title of their next album, which will be a trilogy of albums. The album's title is Violeta Violeta and its recording sessions will be financed by the income produced by their tour in February 2010. People attending the tour are to be given special edition versions of the album. They released their first single from the trilogy, "Philemon Arthur & the Dung", in August, 2010. They released the sheet music for their second single, "Hjerteknuser", in October; in the same month, the single and its accompanying music video were released. The first volume of the trilogy was released on January 31, 2011. Stian Kristiansen has been said to be directing a music video for a song from the album; however, currently the only video, "Hjerteknuser", has been directed by Thomas Berg. Their tenth-anniversary concert, which coincides with the final performance of the supporting tour, was held at Oslo Spektrum on 9 April 2011. The performance was recorded and was released as the live DVD/CD Live i Oslo Spektrum on 11 November 2011.

In 2012, the band was awarded Årets Spellemann (Spellemann of the Year) in a ceremony in their "hometown" of Stavanger. During their acceptance speech they announced that following their 2013 tour, they would retire after thirteen years together. In 2013 they also contributed to the book Think like a rockstar ("Tenk som en rockestjerne"), written by Ståle Økland. Their 2013 Siste Dans Tour (Last Dance Tour) ended in Stavanger on 14 September 2013. The concert, which was their last, was streamed online to fans and published on DVD and Blu-ray exactly one year later.

=== Dine Gamle Dager Er Nå (2022-present) ===
On October 26, 2022, the band announced that they had discovered boxes of old merchandise, namely T-shirts, and would be donating them to the charitable clothing store Fretex to sell (incidentally the same store where they had bought their stage outfits in 2001). In the following days, fans who had bought the shirts noticed QR codes printed inside, which led to the website dinegamledagererna.no. Those who accessed the website through a QR code received a one-time message telling them they were "one of the 107", while for other visitors the site displayed a music box playing an unknown melody, and allowed people to enter their contact information for further updates. Some fans that registered on the site later received a physical version of that music box delivered to them, along with a QR code. A complementary Instagram account was also discovered, posting teaser images and stories. After two weeks of cryptic teasers, the website and Instagram published a promo video with the music box theme and full orchestration, ending with cut-out letters showing "7.11.1907, 19:07".

These events led to mass speculation that a reunion was imminent, with fans also noting several coincidences: the company behind the website and Instagram (Sesong 1) had previously been responsible for the Kaizervirus marketing for Violeta Violeta vol. III, both Geir Zahl and Janove Ottesen had just finished major solo releases, Terje Winterstø Røthings' band Skambankt had recently completed their farewell tour, and some fans even discovered that the kindergarten where Helge Risa taught had a job listing for his position.

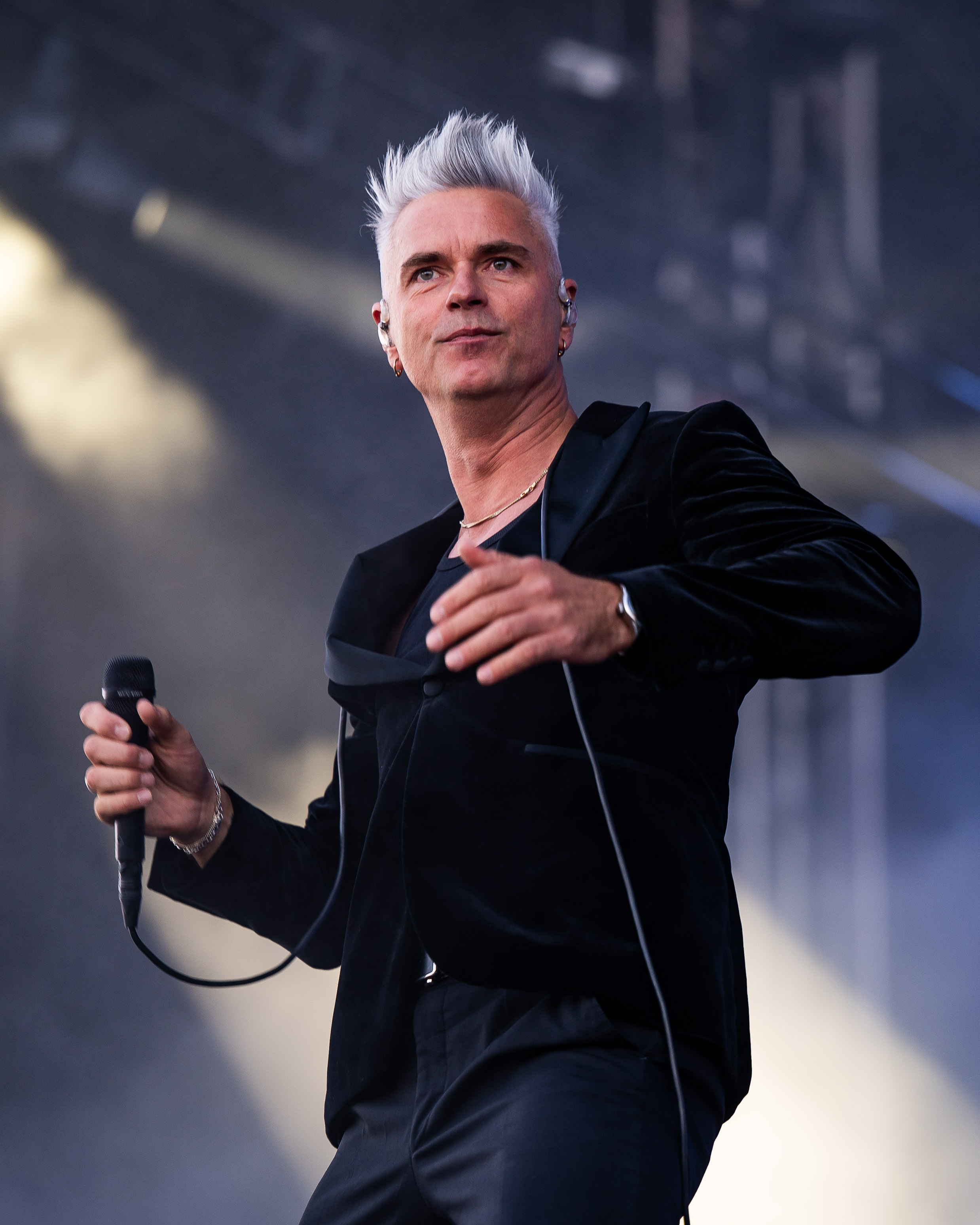
Janove Ottesen in 2025

Following weeks of speculation and teasers, the video Dine gamle dager er nå premiered on the official Kaizers Orchestra YouTube channel on Monday, November 7, at 19:07, the exact time teased previously. Two days later, the band officially confirmed that they had reunited and would be commencing a 24-date Norwegian tour in the fall of 2023, with tickets being made available soon after. After selling out within two hours, sixteen further concerts were added to the schedule later the same day.

In the press release confirming their reunion, the band stated that the comeback had been in the works planned for years, after drummer Rune Solheim had posed the question in 2019, at one of the members' annual Christmas dinners, and that the concert venues had been booked two years in advance.

In June 2023 Kaizers Orchestra began promoting the release of their new single on social media. Their first single in ten years, "Dine gamle dager er nå" was released on 16 June 2023. The song received favorable reviews from the Norwegian media.

== Style and lyrical themes ==
Kaizers Orchestra have been grouped with various genres, including alternative rock, gypsy punk, balkan brass, folk and arena rock. They are regarded as one of Europe's best live acts, with their 2002 Performance at Roskilde Festival earning them "Concert of the Year" by Danish media.

For the most part, lyrics and music is written by Janove Ottesen, although Geir Zahl has also contributed some compositions. The lyrics vary from album to album, and many of the songs' storylines are intertwined, with recurring characters being explored during the course of several songs. This led to the musical Sonny in November 2011, which is based on their first three albums. The lyrics of Ompa til du dør consist of stories of a handful of characters involving war, the resistance, and the mafia. Their second album, Evig Pint, consists of fewer characters and more focused, darker themes: life, death, betrayal, drugs, and once again, the mafia. Their third album, Maestro, focuses on things happening in a mental institution and the corruption involved.

For their fourth album, Maskineri, they attempted to break their tradition and made none of the songs connected; they also stopped using characters. The songs were still stories, but they had no connection with each other or their other albums. After the release of this album they decided to release their compilation album Våre demoner, which consisted of many older songs that were cleaned up, so the lyrical content of that was similar to their first three albums.

After Våre demoner, Kaizers Orchestra released the Violeta Violeta trilogy. The lyrics of which are based around five characters: a crazy mother, Beatrice; her daughter, Violeta; her father, Kenneth; Kenneth's brother; and the girlfriend of Kenneth's brother (an old friend of Beatrice and the maid of honor at Kenneth's/Beatrice's wedding), Cecilia. Violeta was taken from her mother, by her father, and the only way they can see each other is in their dreams. Janove has explained the lyrics are magic realism and they are similar to a Tim Burton film.

== Band members ==
Current members

- Janove Ottesen ("Jackal Kaizer") – lead vocals, guitars, percussions (2000–2013, 2022–present)
- Geir Zahl ("Hellraizer Kaizer") – guitars, vocals, backing vocals, oil barrel (2000–2013, 2022–present)
- Terje Winterstø Røthing ("Killmaster Kaizer") – guitars, backing vocals, oil barrel (2000–2013, 2022–present)
- Helge Risa ("Omen Kaizer") – organ, piano, accordion, backing vocals (2000–2013, 2022–present)
- Rune Solheim ("Mink Kaizer") – drums, percussion (2000–2013, 2022–present)
- Øyvind Storesund ("Thunder Kaizer") – double bass, bass guitar (2003–2013, 2022–present)

Former members

- Jon Sjøen ("Lion King Kaizer") – double bass, bass guitar (2000–2003)

== Discography ==
Studio albums

- Ompa til du dør (2001)
- Evig pint (2003)
- Maestro (2005)
- Maskineri (2008)
- Våre demoner (2009)
- Violeta Violeta Vol. I (2011)
- Violeta Violeta Vol. II (2011)
- Violeta Violeta Vol. III (2012)

== Awards ==
2001

- Spellemannprisen – Best Rock

2002

- Edvardprisen – Best Rock

2003

- Spellemannprisen – Best Music Video (Evig pint)

2009

- NRK P3 – Song of the Decade (Ompa til du dør)

2012

- Spellemannprisen – Spellemann of the Year
- Spellemannprisen – Best Music Video (Begravelsespolka)

2013

- P3 Gull – Best Live Band
