= Terje Winterstø Røthing =

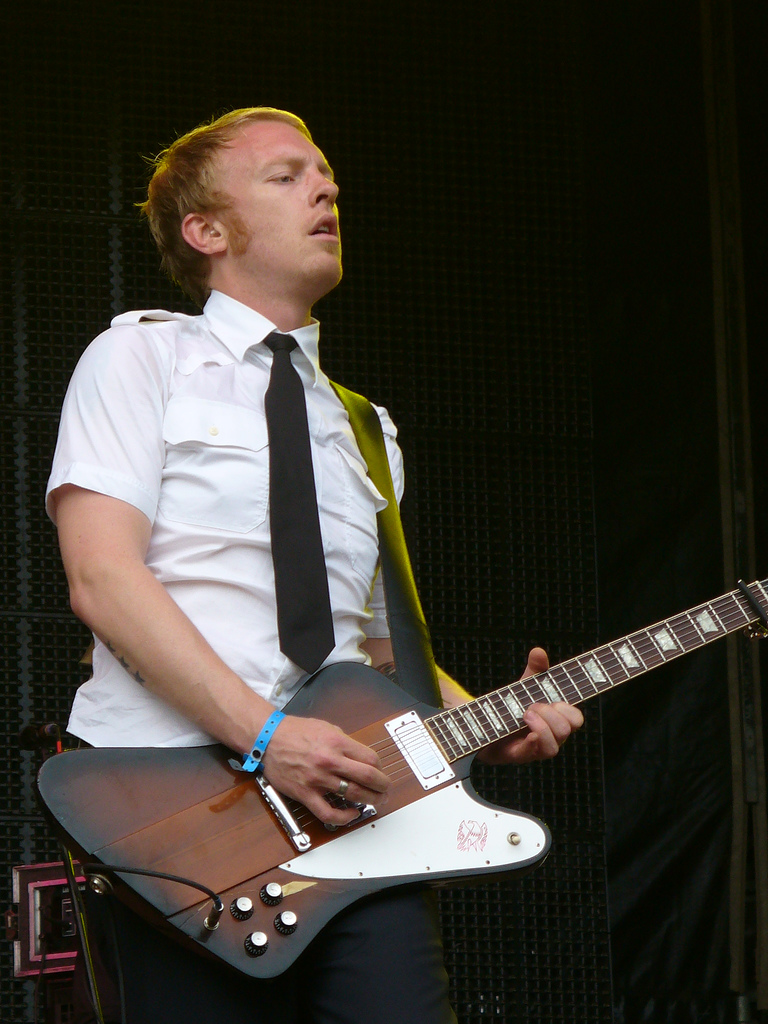
- Terje Winterstø Røthing performing at Sziget Festival with his band Kaizers Orchestra. 9 August 2007.

Background information
- Also known as: Terje "Killmaster" Kaizer, Ted Winters
- Born: 5 August 1977 (age 49)
- Origin: Klepp Municipality, Norway
- Genres: Rock/Punk/Hard rock
- Instruments: Guitar, Vocals, Oil barrel, Mandolin, Tambourine, Percussion

Terje Winterstø Røthing (born Terje Vinterstø in 1977) is a Norwegian musician, playing guitar in the rock bands Kaizers Orchestra and Skambankt.

Røthing joined the band Kaizers Orchestra soon after the band started in 2000. He had participated with various bandmembers' earlier projects, and was a longtime friend of members Janove Ottesen and Geir Zahl. He had participated on every recording of the bands Blod, Snått & Juling and nom. Like Zahl, he had appeared at the Klepp Rockclub, and played funk/rock guitar in the band Zombie Porrkchop and later guitar in the bands Watershed, Ebenezer, The Goo Men, and Johnny and the Sexual Problems.

As of 2011, he played the lead guitar in the Norwegian rock band Kaizers Orchestra under the name Terje "Killmaster" Kaizer.

Røthing is also the frontman of the Norwegian punk band Skambankt that plays a mixture of punk, rock'n'roll and hard rock. In that band, he goes by the name Ted Winters and plays second guitar and sings.

In 2009, Røthing opened a photo-exhibit at a gallery in Oslo, with photos from Kaizers Orchestra's tour(s), in cooperation with Paal Audestad.

In the aftermath of the 2012 Norwegian Spellemann Awards, Røthing earned criticism after showering a fellow musician's head with beer as a response to an alleged racist comment during the show. Røthing later posted a public apology to the musician in question on Kaizers Orchestra's official Facebook page, admitting that he had overreacted.

December 2024, Røthing launched a Facebook page for a new solo project, titled Winterstø, suggesting new music coming in 2025.

== Private life ==
Terje is married to Ragnhild Winterstø. They had a child in November 2010, during Skambankt's tour and they had to cancel the p3 sessions concert. Ragnhild sings a duet with Janove Ottesen on Kaizers Orchestra's 2008 album Maskineri. The song is named "Den andre er meg".
