= Geir Zahl =

Norwegian musician (born 1975)

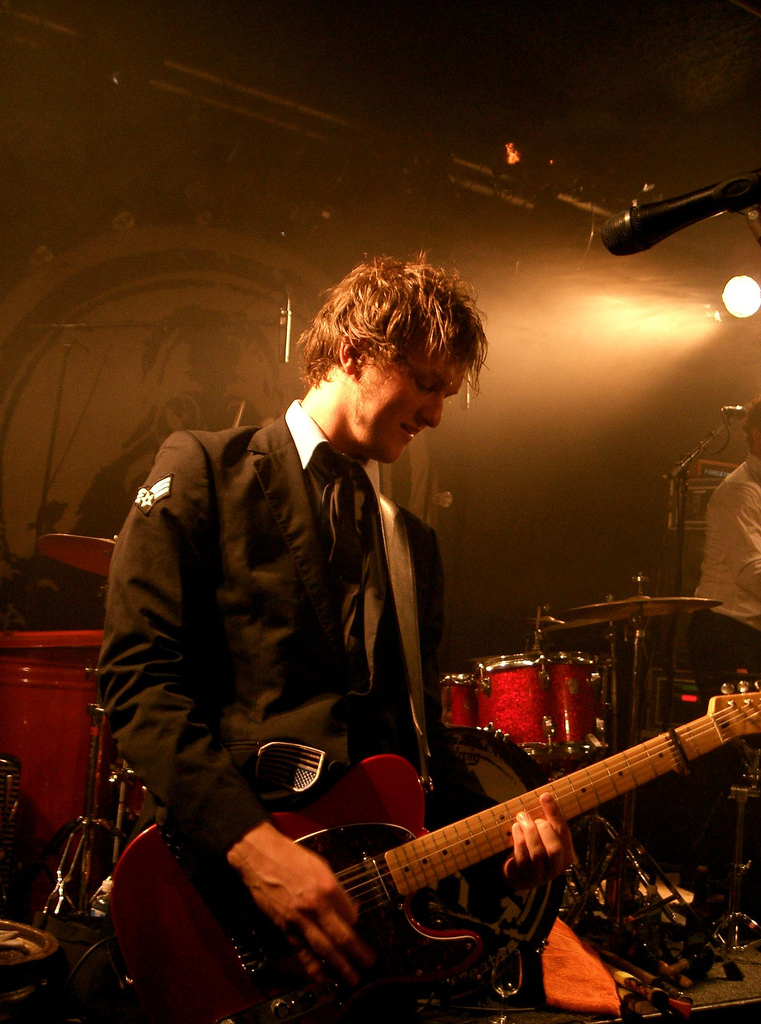
- Geir Zahl performing live in Bern with his band Kaizers Orchestra on 24 September 2005

Background information
- Also known as: Geir "Hellraizer" Kaizer
- Born: 19 May 1975 (age 51)
- Origin: Bryne, Norway
- Genres: Rock, Country rock, Country pop
- Instruments: Guitar, Vocals, Oil barrel
- Member of: Kaizers Orchestra, Zahl, Uncle Deadly

Geir Zahl (born 19 May 1975) is a Norwegian musician. He is known for playing guitar in the Norwegian rock group Kaizers Orchestra. The band was founded by Geir Zahl and Janove Ottesen who had both played together in some other bands, namely Blod, snått & juling and gnom. Geir Zahl is the composer and main vocalist on several songs, both on the recordings and live at concerts.

Geir was born in Bryne, Norway. He befriended Janove Ottesen at an early age, and together, they played in a multitude of bands such as Destruction and Blod, snått & juling. Zahl and Ottesen would write songs by themselves and record them to show to the other one, then work on those songs together. After releasing two cassettes as Blod, Snått & Juling, the two friends hit a creative wall, and their third tape was left, unfinished. Janove joined the army.

Upon his return, Ottesen and Zahl formed a new band, known as gnom. They only released one album, Mys, which did not sell well at all. However, when their new band, Kaizers Orchestra, was created, Geir and Janove started composing songs again.

In 2007, he released his first solo album under the name Zahl. The album is called Nice for a Change. The band that supported him live and on the album consists of Christer Knutsen, Pål Hausken and Bård Halsne.

In 2008, along with John Erik Kaada, Zahl wrote some of the songs for the soundtrack of the Norwegian movie Mannen som elsket Yngve.

In 2009, Zahl filmed and directed a short film about the recording of "Die Polizei", the first single from the Kaizers Orchestra album Våre demoner.

In 2010, Zahl announced the formation of another solo project known as Uncle Deadly. Their album, Monkey Do was released on 2 February 2010.

== Filmography ==
- Kaizers Orchestra – Die Polizei (2009)
- Kaizers Orchestra – Våre Demoner Week (2009)
- Violeta Violeta – The Making of Vol. I (2011)
- Veien til Spektrum (2011)

== Discography ==
=== Zahl ===
- Nice for a Change (2007)

=== Uncle Deadly ===
- Monkey Do (2010)

=== Geir Zahl ===
==== Albums ====
- Ny Start (2020)

==== EPs ====
- Jord EP (2020)
- Ild EP (2020)
- Luft EP (2020)
- Vann EP (2022)

==== Singles ====
- Pusten (2022)

Musical Theatre

- Sult1 (2018)
- Violeta Violeta (Musical theatre adaptation of Kaizers' trilogy, with Janove Ottesen, Written and awaiting production)
