= List of number-one singles of the 2020s (Norway) =

This is a list of number-one singles during the 2020s according to VG-lista, a chart that ranks the best-performing singles of Norway each week.

== 2020 ==
Week	Issue date	Title	Artist(s)	Ref.
1	3 January	"Blinding Lights"	The Weeknd	
2	10 January	"Blinding Lights"	The Weeknd	
3	17 January	"Blinding Lights"	The Weeknd	
4	24 January	"Haugenstua"	Herman Flesvig	
5	31 January	"Blinding Lights"	The Weeknd	
6	7 February	"Blinding Lights"	The Weeknd	
7	14 February	"Blinding Lights"	The Weeknd	
8	21 February	"Blinding Lights"	The Weeknd	
9	28 February	"Blinding Lights"	The Weeknd	
10	6 March	"Blinding Lights"	The Weeknd	
11	13 March	"Blinding Lights"	The Weeknd	
12	20 March	"Kaller på deg"	Tix	
13	27 March	"Blinding Lights"	The Weeknd	
14	3 April	"Karantene"	Tix	
15	10 April	"Karantene"	Tix	
16	17 April	"Karantene"	Tix	
17	24 April	"Svag"	Victor Leksell	
18	1 May	"Svag"	Victor Leksell	
19	8 May	"Svag"	Victor Leksell	
20	15 May	"Svag"	Victor Leksell	
21	22 May	"Svag"	Victor Leksell	
22	29 May	"Svag"	Victor Leksell	
23	5 June	"Svag"	Victor Leksell	
24	12 June	"Svag"	Victor Leksell	
25	19 June	"Svag"	Victor Leksell	
26	26 June	"Svag"	Victor Leksell	
27	3 July	"Savage Love (Laxed – Siren Beat)"	Jawsh 685 and Jason Derulo	
28	10 July	"Savage Love (Laxed – Siren Beat)"	Jawsh 685 and Jason Derulo	
29	17 July	"Savage Love (Laxed – Siren Beat)"	Jawsh 685 and Jason Derulo	
30	24 July	"Svag"	Victor Leksell	
31	31 July	"Svag"	Victor Leksell	
32	7 August	"Svag"	Victor Leksell	
33	14 August	"Igjen og igjen"	El Papi featuring Tix	
34	21 August	"Igjen og igjen"	El Papi featuring Tix	
35	28 August	"Mood"	24kGoldn featuring Iann Dior	
36	4 September	"Mood"	24kGoldn featuring Iann Dior	
37	11 September	"Mood"	24kGoldn featuring Iann Dior	
38	18 September	"Mood"	24kGoldn featuring Iann Dior	
39	25 September	"Mood"	24kGoldn featuring Iann Dior	
40	2 October	"Mood"	24kGoldn featuring Iann Dior	
41	9 October	"Mood"	24kGoldn featuring Iann Dior	
42	16 October	"Mood"	24kGoldn featuring Iann Dior	
43	23 October	"Mood"	24kGoldn featuring Iann Dior	
44	30 October	"Lonely"	Justin Bieber and Benny Blanco	
45	6 November	"Lonely"	Justin Bieber and Benny Blanco	
46	13 November	"Lonely"	Justin Bieber and Benny Blanco	
47	20 November	"Mood"	24kGoldn featuring Iann Dior	
48	27 November	"Lonely"	Justin Bieber and Benny Blanco	
49	4 December	"All I Want for Christmas Is You"	Mariah Carey	
50	11 December	"All I Want for Christmas Is You"	Mariah Carey	
51	18 December	"Without You"	The Kid Laroi	
52	25 December	"All I Want for Christmas Is You"	Mariah Carey	

== 2021 ==
Week	Issue date	Title	Artist(s)	Ref.
53	1 January	"Without You"	The Kid Laroi	
1	8 January	"Without You"	The Kid Laroi	
2	15 January	"Drivers License"	Olivia Rodrigo	
3	22 January	"Drivers License"	Olivia Rodrigo	
4	29 January	"Drivers License"	Olivia Rodrigo	
5	5 February	"Drivers License"	Olivia Rodrigo	
6	12 February	"Drivers License"	Olivia Rodrigo	
7	19 February	"Jeg glemmer deg aldri"	Emma Steinbakken	
8	26 February	"Ut av mørket"	Tix	
9	5 March	"Jeg glemmer deg aldri"	Emma Steinbacken	
10	12 March	"Wellerman"	Nathan Evans, 220 Kid, Billen Ted	
11	19 March	"Wellerman"	Nathan Evans, 220 Kid, Billen Ted	
12	26 March	"Peaches"	Justin Bieber featuring Daniel Caesar and Giveon	
13	2 April	"Peaches"	Justin Bieber featuring Daniel Caesar and Giveon	
14	9 April	"Montero (Call Me by Your Name)"	Lil Nas X	
15	16 April	"Montero (Call Me by Your Name)"	Lil Nas X	
16	23 April	"Montero (Call Me by Your Name)"	Lil Nas X	
17	30 April	"Den fineste Chevy'n"	Halva Priset featuring Maria Mena	
18	7 May	"Den fineste Chevy'n"	Halva Priset featuring Maria Mena	
19	14 May	"Den fineste Chevy'n"	Halva Priset featuring Maria Mena	
20	21 May	"Engel, ikke dra"	Tix	
21	28 May	"Good 4 U"	Olivia Rodrigo	
22	4 June	"Good 4 U"	Olivia Rodrigo	
23	11 June	"Good 4 U"	Olivia Rodrigo	
24	18 June	"Good 4 U"	Olivia Rodrigo	
25	25 June	"Good 4 U"	Olivia Rodrigo	
26	2 July	"Good 4 U"	Olivia Rodrigo	
27	9 July	"Bad Habits"	Ed Sheeran	
28	16 July	"Stay"	The Kid Laroi and Justin Bieber	
29	23 July	"Stay"	The Kid Laroi and Justin Bieber	
30	30 July	"Stay"	The Kid Laroi and Justin Bieber	
31	6 August	"Stay"	The Kid Laroi and Justin Bieber	
32	13 August	"Stay"	The Kid Laroi and Justin Bieber	
33	20 August	"Stay"	The Kid Laroi and Justin Bieber	
34	27 August	"Stay"	The Kid Laroi and Justin Bieber	
35	3 September	"Stay"	The Kid Laroi and Justin Bieber	
36	10 September	"Stay"	The Kid Laroi and Justin Bieber	
37	17 September	"Stay"	The Kid Laroi and Justin Bieber	
38	24 September	"Stay"	The Kid Laroi and Justin Bieber	
39	1 October	"Love Nwantiti (Ah Ah Ah)"	CKay	
40	8 October	"Love Nwantiti (Ah Ah Ah)"	CKay	
41	15 October	"Love Nwantiti (Ah Ah Ah)"	CKay	
42	22 October	"Easy on Me"	Adele	
43	29 October	"Easy on Me"	Adele	
44	5 November	"Easy on Me"	Adele	
45	12 November	"Ghost Town"	Benson Boone	
46	19 November	"Easy on Me"	Adele	
47	26 November	"Easy on Me"	Adele	
48	3 December	"Ludvig Daae"	Helene Olafsen	
49	10 December	"Snowman"	Sia	
50	17 December	"Snowman"	Sia	
51	24 December	"Når julefreden senker seg"	Truls Svendsen and Charlotte Smith	
52	31 December	"Når snøen smelter"	Astrid S	

== 2022 ==
Week	Issue date	Title	Artist(s)	Ref.
1	7 January	"ABCDEFU"	Gayle	
2	14 January	"Fingers Crossed"	Lauren Spencer-Smith	
3	21 January	"Fingers Crossed"	Lauren Spencer-Smith	
4	28 January	"Fingers Crossed"	Lauren Spencer-Smith	
5	4 February	"PAF.no"	Karpe	
6	11 February	"PAF.no"	Karpe	
7	18 February	"PAF.no"	Karpe	
8	25 February	"OK jeg lover"	Ramón	
9	4 March	"OK jeg lover"	Ramón	
10	11 March	"OK jeg lover"	Ramón	
11	18 March	"Dans på bordet"	Ballinciaga and David Mokel	
12	25 March	"Dans på bordet"	Ballinciaga and David Mokel	
13	1 April	"Dans på bordet"	Ballinciaga and David Mokel	
14	8 April	"Dans på bordet"	Ballinciaga and David Mokel	
15	15 April	"Dans på bordet"	Ballinciaga and David Mokel	
16	22 April	"Dans på bordet"	Ballinciaga and David Mokel	
17	29 April	"Dans på bordet"	Ballinciaga and David Mokel	
18	6 May	"Stay Keeg"	Beathoven and Henrik von Grogg	
19	13 May	"Stay Keeg"	Beathoven and Henrik von Grogg	
20	20 May	"Dans på bordet"	Ballinciaga and David Mokel	
21	27 May	"Dans på bordet"	Ballinciaga and David Mokel	
22	3 June	"Dans på bordet"	Ballinciaga and David Mokel	
23	10 June	"Dans på bordet"	Ballinciaga and David Mokel	
24	17 June	"Sør-Afrika"	Capow x 2G and Beathoven	
25	24 June	"Sør-Afrika"	Capow x 2G and Beathoven	
26	1 July	"Sør-Afrika"	Capow x 2G and Beathoven	
27	8 July	"Sør-Afrika"	Capow x 2G and Beathoven	
28	15 July	"Sør-Afrika"	Capow x 2G and Beathoven	
29	22 July	"Sør-Afrika"	Capow x 2G and Beathoven	
30	29 July	"Sør-Afrika"	Capow x 2G and Beathoven	
31	5 August	"Sør-Afrika"	Capow x 2G and Beathoven	
32	12 August	"Sør-Afrika"	Capow x 2G and Beathoven	
33	19 August	"Sør-Afrika"	Capow x 2G and Beathoven	
34	26 August	"Fakk min X"	Kamelen and Ballinciaga	
35	2 September	"I'm Good (Blue)"	David Guetta and Bebe Rexha	
36	9 September	"I'm Good (Blue)"	David Guetta and Bebe Rexha	
37	16 September	"I'm Good (Blue)"	David Guetta and Bebe Rexha	
38	23 September	"I'm Good (Blue)"	David Guetta and Bebe Rexha	
39	30 September	"I'm Good (Blue)"	David Guetta and Bebe Rexha	
40	7 October	"I'm Good (Blue)"	David Guetta and Bebe Rexha	
41	14 October	"I'm Good (Blue)"	David Guetta and Bebe Rexha	
42	21 October	"I'm Good (Blue)"	David Guetta and Bebe Rexha	
43	28 October	"Frida Kahlo"	Marstein	
44	4 November	"Frida Kahlo"	Marstein	
45	11 November	"Danser videre i livet"	Hkeem and Makosir	
46	18 November	"Frida Kahlo"	Marstein	
47	25 November	"Oppmerksomhet"	Morgan Sulele and William Gamborg	
48	2 December	"All I Want for Christmas Is You"	Mariah Carey	
49	9 December	"Snowman"	Sia	
50	16 December	"Snowman"	Sia	
51	23 December	"Snowman"	Sia	
52	30 December	"Snowman"	Sia	

== 2023 ==
Week	Issue date	Title	Artist(s)	Ref.
1	6 January	"Floden"	Emma Steinbakken	
2	13 January	"Floden"	Emma Steinbakken	
3	20 January	"Floden"	Emma Steinbakken	
4	27 January	"Flowers"	Miley Cyrus	
5	3 February	"Flowers"	Miley Cyrus	
6	10 February	"Queen of Kings"	Alessandra	
7	17 February	"Flowers"	Miley Cyrus	
8	24 February	"Delilah"	Emma Steinbakken	
9	3 March	"Delilah"	Emma Steinbakken	
10	10 March	"Delilah"	Emma Steinbakken	
11	17 March	"Klikk"	Undergrunn	
12	24 March	"Klikk"	Undergrunn	
13	31 March	"Klikk"	Undergrunn	
14	7 April	"Flowers"	Miley Cyrus	
15	14 April	"1"	Broiler and Hjorterud Allé	
16	21 April	"Michelin Stjerner"	Undergrunn	
17	28 April	"Michelin Stjerner"	Undergrunn	
18	5 May	"Michelin Stjerner"	Undergrunn	
19	12 May	"Haien kommer (Sharkdog 2023)"	Kudos and Golfklubb	
20	19 May	"Haien kommer (Sharkdog 2023)"	Kudos and Golfklubb	
21	26 May	"Haien kommer (Sharkdog 2023)"	Kudos and Golfklubb	
22	2 June	"Haien kommer (Sharkdog 2023)"	Kudos and Golfklubb	
23	9 June	"Haien kommer (Sharkdog 2023)"	Kudos and Golfklubb	
24	16 June	"Haien kommer (Sharkdog 2023)"	Kudos and Golfklubb	
25	23 June	"Haien kommer (Sharkdog 2023)"	Kudos and Golfklubb	
26	30 June	"Haien kommer (Sharkdog 2023)"	Kudos and Golfklubb	
27	7 July	"Haien kommer (Sharkdog 2023)"	Kudos and Golfklubb	
28	14 July	"Haien kommer (Sharkdog 2023)"	Kudos and Golfklubb	
29	21 July	"Haien kommer (Sharkdog 2023)"	Kudos and Golfklubb	
30	28 July	"Badebussen"	DJ MøMø featuring Kjartan Lauritzen	
31	4 August	"Badebussen"	DJ MøMø featuring Kjartan Lauritzen	
32	11 August	"Badebussen"	DJ MøMø featuring Kjartan Lauritzen	
33	18 August	"Badebussen"	DJ MøMø featuring Kjartan Lauritzen	
34	25 August	"Badebussen"	DJ MøMø featuring Kjartan Lauritzen	
35	1 September	"Badebussen"	DJ MøMø featuring Kjartan Lauritzen	
36	8 September	"Badebussen"	DJ MøMø featuring Kjartan Lauritzen	
37	15 September	"Badebussen"	DJ MøMø featuring Kjartan Lauritzen	
38	22 September	"Greedy"	Tate McRae	
39	29 September	"Greedy"	Tate McRae	
40	6 October	"Greedy"	Tate McRae	
41	13 October	"Greedy"	Tate McRae	
42	20 October	"Greedy"	Tate McRae	
43	27 October	"Si No Estás"	Íñigo Quintero	
44	3 November	"Si No Estás"	Íñigo Quintero	
45	10 November	"Si No Estás"	Íñigo Quintero	
46	17 November	"Kristoffer Robin"	Randi Oline	
47	24 November	"Badebussen"	DJ MøMø featuring Kjartan Lauritzen	
48	1 December	"Snowman"	Sia	
49	8 December	"Snowman"	Sia	
50	15 December	"Snowman"	Sia	
51	22 December	"Snowman"	Sia	
52	29 December	"Snowman"	Sia	

== 2024 ==
Week	Issue date	Title	Artist(s)	Ref.
1	5 January	"Badebussen"	DJ MøMø featuring Kjartan Lauritzen	
2	12 January	"Wow"	Ramón	
3	19 January	"Når du slår ut håret blir jeg slått ut"	Broiler and Beathoven	
4	26 January	"Jeg vil ha (Parlamentet)"	Fjellrev and Roc Meiniac	
5	2 February	"Whatever"	Kygo and Ava Max	
6	9 February	"Beautiful Things"	Benson Boone	
7	16 February	"Beautiful Things"	Benson Boone	
8	23 February	"Beautiful Things"	Benson Boone	
9	1 March	"Soldat" (remix)	Golfklubb, VC Barre, Pablo Paz and Takenoelz	
10	8 March	"Soldat" (remix)	Golfklubb, VC Barre, Pablo Paz and Takenoelz	
11	15 March	"Soldat" (remix)	Golfklubb, VC Barre, Pablo Paz and Takenoelz	
12	22 March	"Soldat" (remix)	Golfklubb, VC Barre, Pablo Paz and Takenoelz	
13	29 March	"Beautiful Things"	Benson Boone	
14	5 April	"Bærum Bitches (Mannschaft)"	Søte og Rare Gutter and Mannschaft	
15	12 April	"Bærum Bitches (Mannschaft)"	Søte og Rare Gutter and Mannschaft	
16	19 April	"Bærum Bitches (Mannschaft)"	Søte og Rare Gutter and Mannschaft	
17	26 April	"Too Sweet"	Hozier	
18	3 May	"Tenke sjæl"	Undergrunn	
19	10 May	"A Bar Song (Tipsy)"	Shaboozey	
20	17 May	"I Had Some Help"	Post Malone featuring Morgan Wallen	
21	24 May	"A Bar Song (Tipsy)"	Shaboozey	
22	31 May	"A Bar Song (Tipsy)"	Shaboozey	
23	7 June	"Houdini"	Eminem	
24	14 June	"Houdini"	Eminem	
25	21 June	"Please Please Please"	Sabrina Carpenter	
26	28 June	"24/7"	Rakkere	
27	5 July	"24/7"	Rakkere	
28	12 July	"24/7"	Rakkere	
29	19 July	"24/7"	Rakkere	
30	26 July	"24/7"	Rakkere	
31	2 August	"Sigg"	Ballinciaga	
32	9 August	"Sigg"	Ballinciaga	
33	16 August	"Sigg"	Ballinciaga	
34	23 August	"Så længe jeg er sexy"	Annika	
35	30 August	"Så længe jeg er sexy"	Annika	
36	6 September	"Die with a Smile"	Lady Gaga and Bruno Mars	
37	13 September	"Let's Go"	Stig Brenner and Arif Murakami	
38	20 September	"Die with a Smile"	Lady Gaga and Bruno Mars	
39	27 September	"Die with a Smile"	Lady Gaga and Bruno Mars	
40	4 October	"Die with a Smile"	Lady Gaga and Bruno Mars	
41	11 October	"Die with a Smile"	Lady Gaga and Bruno Mars	
42	18 October	"Die with a Smile"	Lady Gaga and Bruno Mars	
43	25 October	"Sees igjen"	Golfklubb, Dizzy and Philippe	
44	1 November	"Sammen"	Marstein and Annika	
45	8 November	"Sammen"	Marstein and Annika	
46	15 November	"Sammen"	Marstein and Annika	
47	22 November	"Siste dans"	Delara	
48	29 November	"Siste dans"	Delara	
49	6 December	"Snowman"	Sia	
50	13 December	"Snowman"	Sia	
51	20 December	"Snowman"	Sia	
52	27 December	"Snowman"	Sia	

== 2025 ==
Week	Issue date	Title	Artist(s)	Ref.
1	3 January	"That's So True"	Gracie Abrams	
2	10 January	"Det regner i Oslo"	Astrid S	
3	17 January	"Fanga av ein stormvind"	Kjartan Lauritzen	
4	24 January	"Fanga av ein stormvind"	Kjartan Lauritzen	
5	31 January	"Fanga av ein stormvind"	Kjartan Lauritzen	
6	7 February	"APT."	Rosé and Bruno Mars	
7	14 February	"Få det på"	Astrid S and Stig Brenner	
8	21 February	"Ordinary"	Alex Warren	
9	28 February	"Ordinary"	Alex Warren	
10	7 March	"Ordinary"	Alex Warren	
11	14 March	"Ordinary"	Alex Warren	
12	21 March	"Ordinary"	Alex Warren	
13	28 March	"Ordinary"	Alex Warren	
14	4 April	"Ordinary"	Alex Warren	
15	11 April	"Ordinary"	Alex Warren	
16	18 April	"Ordinary"	Alex Warren	
17	25 April	"Ordinary"	Alex Warren	
18	2 May	"Ordinary"	Alex Warren	
19	9 May	"Ordinary"	Alex Warren	
20	16 May	"Ordinary"	Alex Warren	
21	23 May	"Bara bada bastu"	KAJ	
22	30 May	"Svagare än jag"	Ida-Lova	
23	6 June	"Falle og slå seg"	Ari Bajgora	
24	13 June	"Falle og slå seg"	Ari Bajgora	
25	20 June	"Falle og slå seg"	Ari Bajgora	
26	27 June	"Falle og slå seg"	Ari Bajgora	
27	4 July	"Falle og slå seg"	Ari Bajgora	
28	11 July	"Falle og slå seg"	Ari Bajgora	
29	18 July	"Falle og slå seg"	Ari Bajgora	
30	25 July	"Falle og slå seg"	Ari Bajgora	
31	1 August	"Falle og slå seg"	Ari Bajgora	
32	8 August	"Falle og slå seg"	Ari Bajgora	
33	15 August	"Golden"	Huntrix	
34	22 August	"Golden"	Huntrix	
35	29 August	"Golden"	Huntrix	
36	5 September	"Golden"	Huntrix	
37	12 September	"Golden"	Huntrix	
38	19 September	"Golden"	Huntrix	
39	26 September	"Golden"	Huntrix	
40	3 October	"Golden"	Huntrix	
41	10 October	"The Fate of Ophelia"	Taylor Swift	
42	17 October	"The Fate of Ophelia"	Taylor Swift	
43	24 October	"The Fate of Ophelia"	Taylor Swift	
44	31 October	"The Fate of Ophelia"	Taylor Swift	
45	7 November	"The Fate of Ophelia"	Taylor Swift	
46	14 November	"The Fate of Ophelia"	Taylor Swift	
47	21 November	"The Fate of Ophelia"	Taylor Swift	
48	28 November	"The Fate of Ophelia"	Taylor Swift	
49	5 December	"Snowman"	Sia	
50	12 December	"Snowman"	Sia	
51	19 December	"Snowman"	Sia	
52	26 December	"Snowman"	Sia	

== 2026 ==
Week	Issue date	Title	Artist(s)	Ref.
1	2 January	"The Fate of Ophelia"	Taylor Swift	
2	9 January	"The Fate of Ophelia"	Taylor Swift	
3	16 January	"Baby, du er rå!"	Ingebjørg Bratland and Hagle	
4	23 January	"Baby, du er rå!"	Ingebjørg Bratland and Hagle	
5	30 January	"Baby, du er rå!"	Ingebjørg Bratland and Hagle	
6	6 February	"Lush Life"	Zara Larsson	
7	13 February	"Hånd i hånd"	Tobias Sten	
8	20 February	"Hånd i hånd"	Tobias Sten	
9	27 February	"Sjelen"	Delara	
10	6 March	"Hånd i hånd"	Tobias Sten	
11	13 March	"Iloveitiloveitiloveit"	Bella Kay	
12	20 March	"Iloveitiloveitiloveit"	Bella Kay	
13	27 March	"Iloveitiloveitiloveit"	Bella Kay	
14	3 April	"Iloveitiloveitiloveit"	Bella Kay	
15	10 April	"Iloveitiloveitiloveit"	Bella Kay	
16	17 April	"Iloveitiloveitiloveit"	Bella Kay	
17	24 April	"Iloveitiloveitiloveit"	Bella Kay	
18	1 May	"Iloveitiloveitiloveit"	Bella Kay	
19	8 May	"Karpe4Life"	Karpe	
20	15 May	"Håpløs"	Roc Boyz and Vinni	
21	22 May	"Håpløs"	Roc Boyz and Vinni	
22	29 May	"Hængarang"	Knut and Snekker Andersen	
23	5 June	"SOS"	Makosir and Ari Bajgora	
24	12 June	"SOS"	Makosir and Ari Bajgora	
25	19 June	"Håpløs"	Roc Boyz and Vinni	
26	26 June	"Vikingblod"	Katastrofe	
27	3 July	"Vikingblod"	Katastrofe	
28	10 July	"Vikingblod"	Katastrofe	
29	17 July	"Kygo Jo" (Kygo remix)	Kygo featuring Lyng	
30	24 July	"Kygo Jo" (Kygo remix)	Kygo featuring Lyng	
31	31 July	"Dai Dai"	Shakira and Burna Boy	
32	7 August	"Dai Dai"	Shakira and Burna Boy	
33	14 August	"Dai Dai"	Shakira and Burna Boy	
34	21 August	"Dai Dai"	Shakira and Burna Boy	
35	28 August	"I takt med deg"	Zimmermann and Bjørn Eidsvåg	
36	4 September	"I takt med deg"	Zimmermann and Bjørn Eidsvåg	
37	11 September	"I takt med deg"	Zimmermann and Bjørn Eidsvåg	
38	18 September	"I takt med deg"	Zimmermann and Bjørn Eidsvåg	
39	25 September	"I takt med deg"	Zimmermann and Bjørn Eidsvåg	
40	2 October	"Håper at du ser meg nå"	Uld	
41	9 October	"Håper at du ser meg nå"	Uld	
42	16 October	"Håper at du ser meg nå"	Uld	
43	23 October	"Housewife"	Tate McRae	
44	30 October	"Housewife"	Tate McRae	
45	6 November	"Housewife"	Tate McRae	
46	13 November	"Housewife"	Tate McRae	
47	20 November	"Housewife"	Tate McRae	

== See also ==
- List of number-one songs in Norway (for pre-2020 number ones)
- List of number-one albums in Norway
