= Spellemann of the Year Award =

Norwegian music industry award

Spellemann of the Year
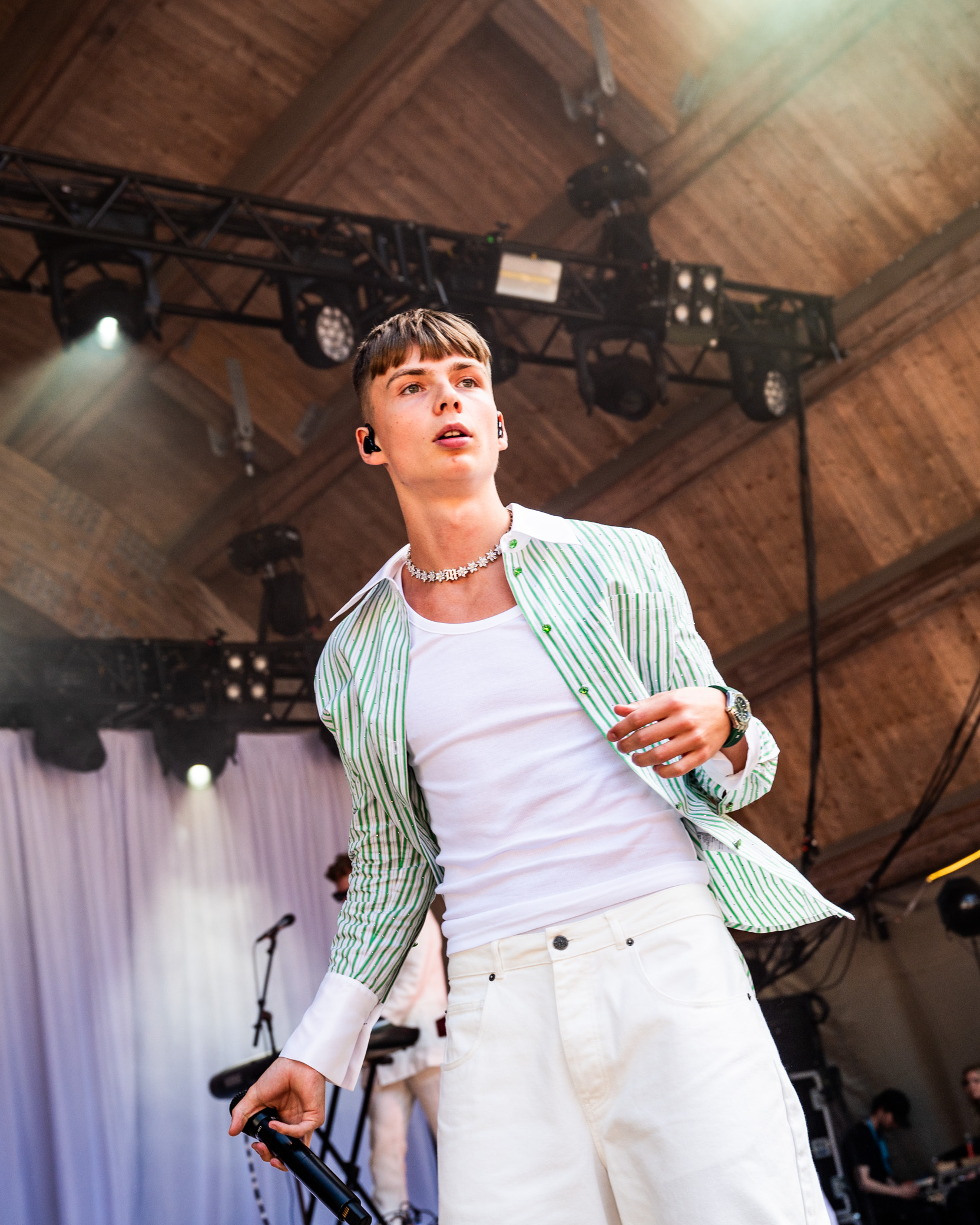
- Norwegian rapper Marstein is the most recent recipient
- Awarded for: Artist who stood out during the previous year
- Country: Norway
- Presented by: IFPI Norge and FONO
- First award: 1986
- Currently held by: Marstein (2025)
- Website: spellemann.no

The Spellemann of the Year (Norwegian: Årets Spellemann) is a traveling trophy awarded each year during the Spellemannprisen. The award goes to a Norwegian artist or group that has distinguished itself in particular in the past year. The winner is chosen on an open basis by a special jury. The award was first awarded during the Spellemannprisen 1985 in 1986, and then went to A-ha.

== Background ==
Unlike most other Spellemann awards, where a professional jury selects a winner from the artists entered, a special jury selects the winner of the Spellemann of the Year on an arbitrary basis. The award also takes into account the artist's performance, commercial success and record releases. The winner receives a bronze statuette shaped like a gramophone player, which they will keep for one year. The award is usually presented by the previous year's winner. The statuette was made by sculptor Erlingur Jónsson.

A precursor to the Spellemann Award of the Year was awarded under the name Artist of the Year to The Monroes in 1984 and Åge Aleksandersen in 1985. The award was the first of the additional classes to be introduced in addition to the existing genre-specific classes. Later, Newcomer of the Year, Hit of the Year and Music Video of the Year were also introduced as additional classes. The award is awarded across the genre-specific classes and is considered the most prestigious of the Spellemann Awards. Up until the 1989 awards ceremony, nominations for the award were announced in advance in the same way as in other classes.

The introduction of the award and its predecessor, Artist of the Year, also made it possible to win two awards in the same year, something The Monroes did the first time it was awarded, and several have done since. The singer Øystein Sunde and the rap duo Karpe are the only ones to have been named Spellemann of the Year twice. Øystein Sunde has also won the award once with Gitarkameratene. Morten Abel and Morten Harket have both been named Spellemann of the Year both as solo artists and with bands, The September When and A-ha, respectively.

== Recipients ==
Below is a list of all the winners since the start in 1986. A list of the winners and nominees for the award can be found on Spellemannprisen's official website.

- 1986: A-ha
- 1987: Sissel Kyrkjebø
- 1988: Jørn Hoel
- 1989: Det Norske Kammerorkester
- 1990: Øystein Sunde
- 1991: Gitarkameratene
- 1992: Dance with a Stranger
- 1993: DumDum Boys
- 1994: The September When
- 1995: Øystein Sunde
- 1996: Morten Harket
- 1997: D.D.E.
- 1998: Bjørn Eidsvåg
- 1999: Leif Ove Andsnes
- 2000: Ole Ivars
- 2001: Herborg Kråkevik
- 2002: Morten Abel
- 2003: Röyksopp
- 2004: Silje Nergaard
- 2005: Odd Nordstoga
- 2006: Madrugada
- 2007: Vamp
- 2008: Hellbillies
- 2009: Espen Lind
- 2010: Alexander Rybak
- 2011: Karpe
- 2012: Jarle Bernhoft
- 2013: Kaizers Orchestra
- 2014: Ole Paus
- 2015: Nico & Vinz
- 2016: Kygo
- 2017: Marcus & Martinus
- 2018: Astrid S
- 2019: Alan Walker
- 2020: Sigrid
- 2021: Tix
- 2022: Girl in Red
- 2023: Karpe
- 2024: Undergrunn
- 2025: Marstein
