= Spellemannprisen =

Award for achievements in Norwegian music

- Current: Spellemannprisen 2024
- Awarded for: Outstanding achievements in Norwegian music
- Country: Norway
- Presented by: IFPI Norge and FONO
- First award: 1973; 53 years ago
- Website: spellemann.no

Television/radio coverage
- Network: NRK1 (1973–2002); TV2 (2003–2011); NRK1 (2012–2023); Nettavisen (2024–present)

Spellemannprisen is a Norwegian music award ceremony presented by IFPI Norge and FONO. It was first awarded in 1973 for the recording year 1972, and has been awarded every year since. It is the most significant award that a group or artist can receive in Norwegian music. The award ceremony is organized by the Spellemann Committee, which is appointed by IFPI Norge and FONO.

The annual ceremony features performances by prominent artists. The awards are presented in a widely viewed broadcast ceremony. The awards are the Norwegian equivalent to the Grammy Awards for music, and it is one of the major awards in Norway along with the Gullruten for television, Amandaprisen for motion pictures, and Heddaprisen for stage performances.

== Juries and scoring ==
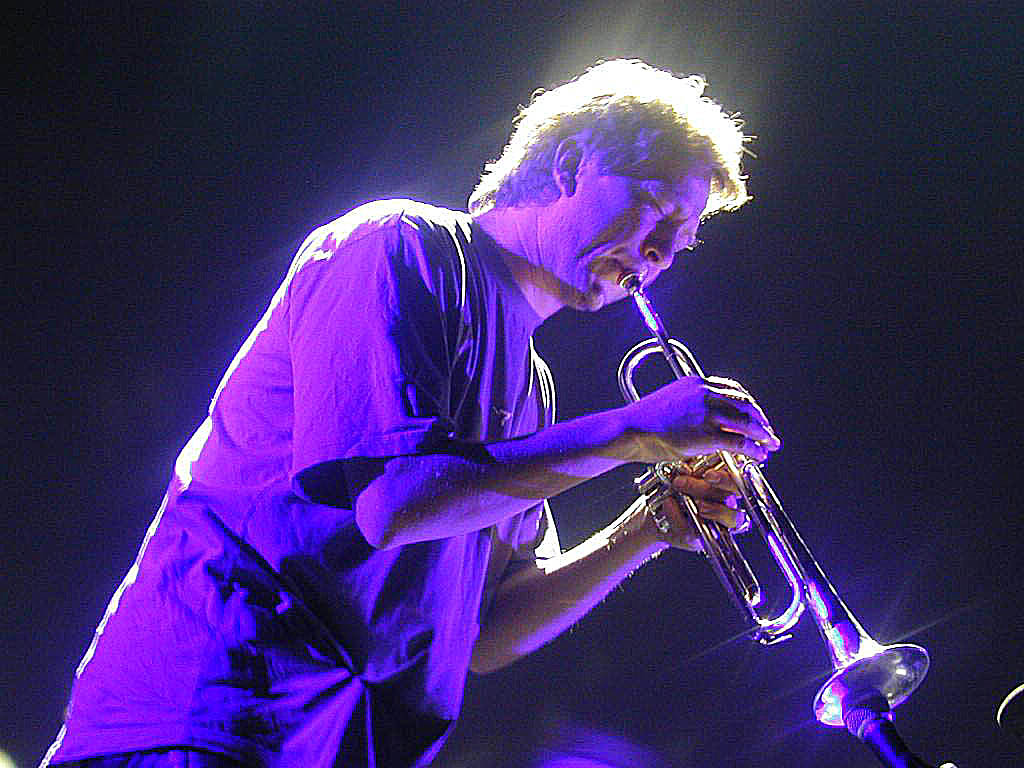
Nils Petter Molvær won in 2000 and 2005.

The number of awards given varies somewhat from year to year. According to the regulations for the 2022 awards, awards are given in a total of 28 categories. Of these, there are 17 genre-specific categories, three awards for the author (Composer, Lyricist and Songwriter), seven additional categories (Spellemann of the Year, Newcomer of the Year, Song of the Year, Music Video of the Year, Producer of the Year, International Success of the Year, and Release of the Year) and the Honorary Prize.

For each of the genre-specific classes as well as the author classes and additional classes, with the exception of Spellemann of the Year, the Honorary Prize and the Release of the Year, a professional jury is appointed. The professional juries decide by means of two rounds of scoring which of the registered artists and albums will be nominated in the various classes. Between three and five artists are nominated in each class. The professional jury then votes for a winner who receives a bronze statuette and diploma. For the Children's Music class, a children's jury is also used to select the winner. In the song of the year class, the winner is selected by the professional jury in combination with an audience vote. An audience vote has also been used in the past to select the winner of the Music Video class. For the Release of the Year class, a grand jury composed of all members of the professional jury is used. For the classes Spellemann of the Year and the Honorary Prize, a special jury nominates artists and selects the winner on an open basis. No nominations for Spellemann of the Year and the honorary prize are announced in advance.

== Spellemann of the Year ==
Established in 1986, the annual Spellemann of the Year (Norwegian: Årets Spellemann) is the most important award in the ceremony. It honors a Norwegian artist or group that has distinguished itself in the past year, taking into account performance, commercial success and record releases. The award is usually presented by the previous year's winner.

== Breakthrough award ==
Since 2007, the winner of the Breakthrough of the Year award (Norwegian: Årets Gjennombrudd), previously called Newcomer of the Year (Norwegian: Årets Nykommer), takes home a prize of 200,000 kroner. The scholarship is awarded by Gramo, a Norwegian music industry funding agency.

Past winners includes Kvelertak, Aurora, Sondre Lerche, Boy Pablo, Lene Marlin, Sigrid, Astrid S, Emilie Nicolas, Donkeyboy and Undergrunn.

== Leading winners ==
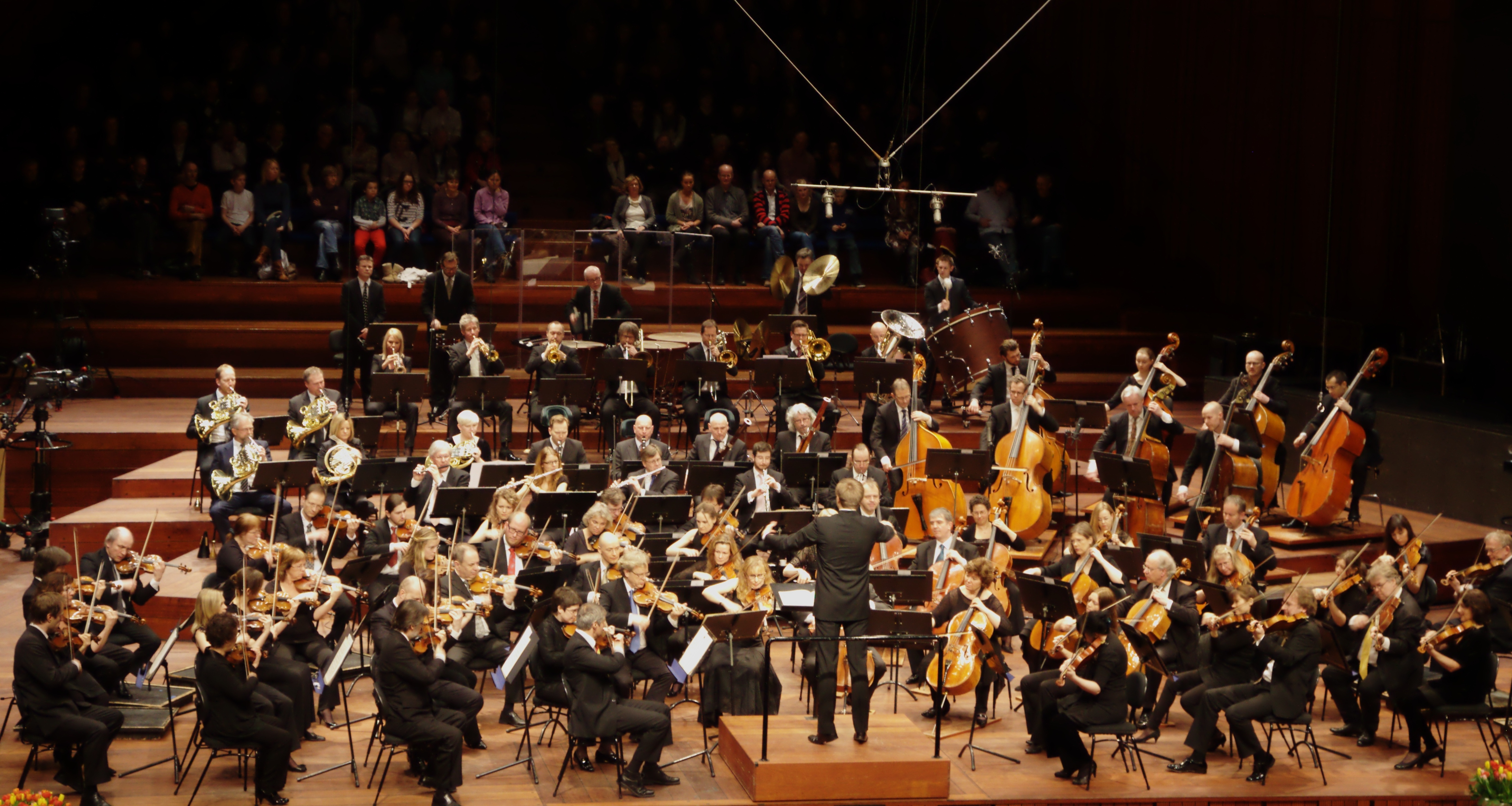
Oslo Philharmonic is the band/group with the highest number of awards.

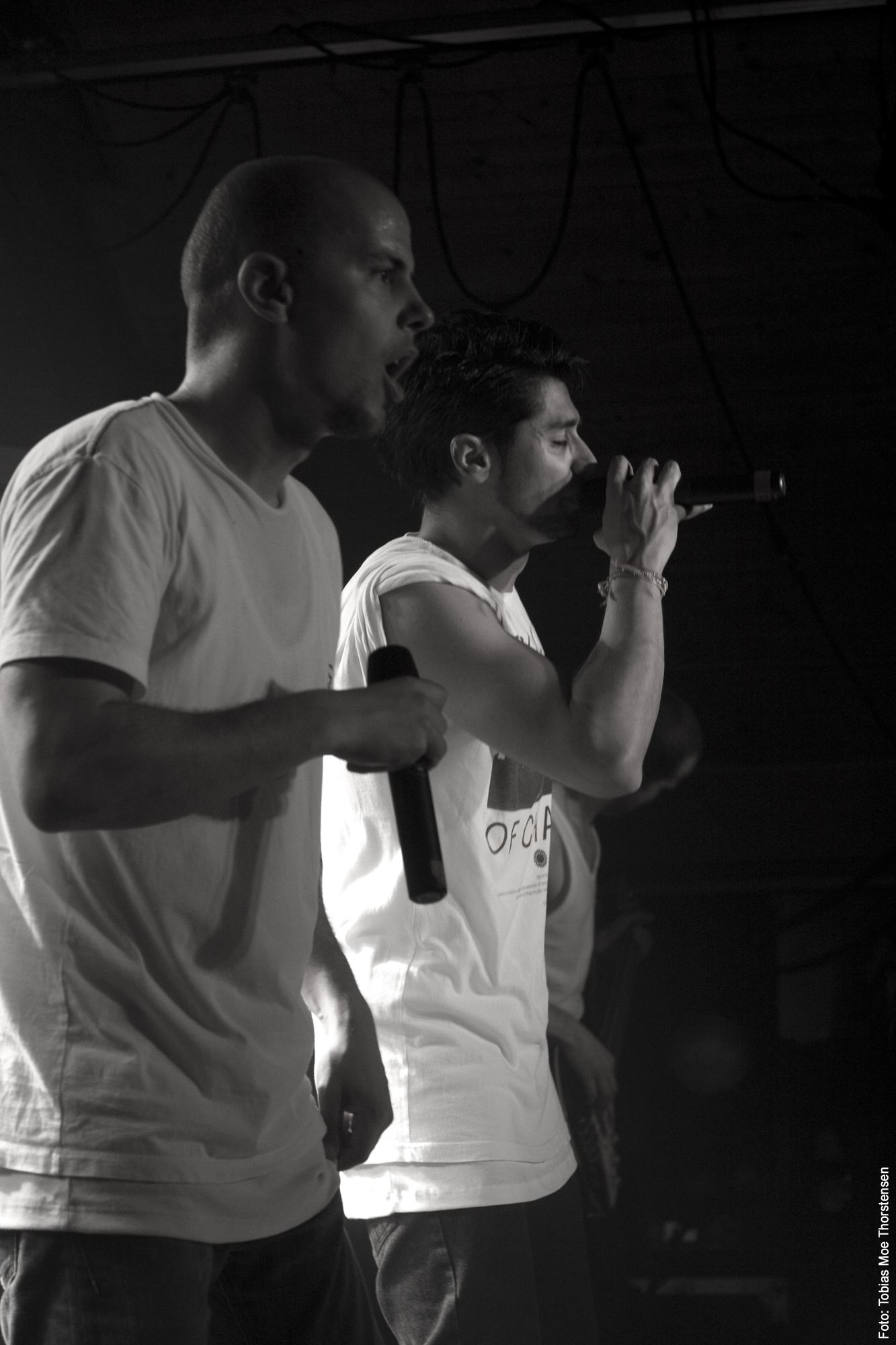
Karpe is the duo with the highest number of awards.

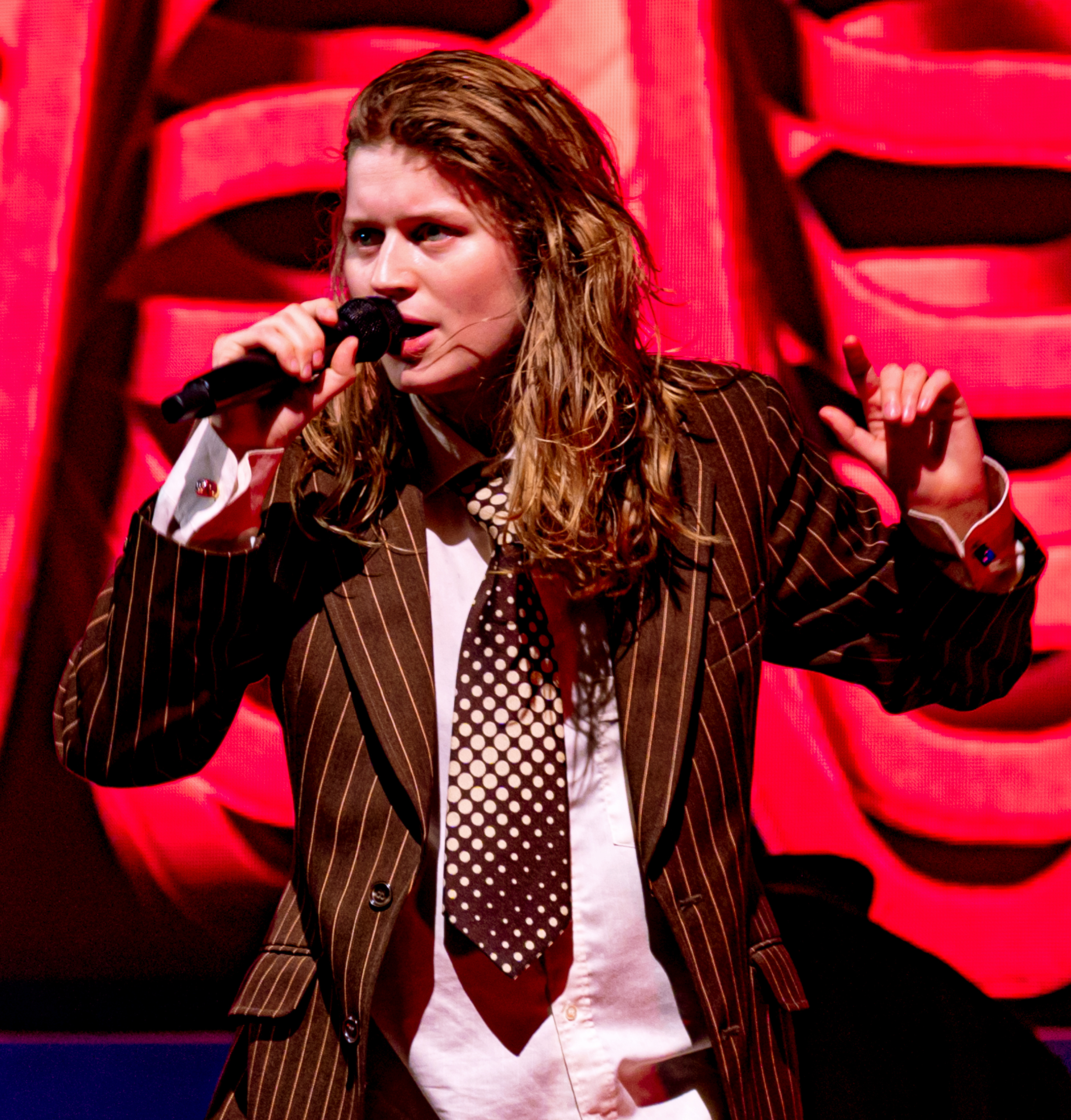
Girl in Red is the female artist with the highest number of awards.

Artist/group	Number of awards	Ref.
Oslo Philharmonic	13	
Karpe	13	
Leif Ove Andsnes	11	
A-ha	9	
Ole Ivars	9	
Cezinando	8	
Odd Børretzen	7	
Det Norske Kammerorkester	7	
Röyksopp	6	
Madcon	6	
Lars Vaular	6	
Girl in Red	6	
Lene Marlin	5	
Truls Mørk	5	
Geirr Lystrup	5	
Madrugada	5	
Vamp	5	
DumDum Boys	5	
Espen Lind	5	
Sidsel Endresen	5	
Odd Nordstoga	5	
Susanne Sundfør	5	
Arve Tellefsen	5	
Enslaved	5	
Frida Ånnevik	5	

== Broadcast channels ==
In 2012, the live award show returned to NRK for the first time since 2002, and remained on the same channel until 2023. From 2003 to 2011, the show was broadcast on TV 2. Since 2024, the ceremony has been broadcast by online newspaper Nettavisen.

== List of ceremonies ==
Edition	Date	Network(s)	Spellemann of the Year winner	Honorary Award winner	Release of the Year winner	Host(s)	Venue	Ref.
1st	3 March 1973	NRK1; NRK P1	No Spellemann of the Year award given	Egil Monn-Iversen	Birgitte Grimstad: Shown by Geirr Tveitt	Rolf Kirkvaag	Chateau Neuf	
2nd	2 March 1974	NRK1; NRK P1	No Spellemann of the Year award given	Sigbjørn Bernhoft Osa	Lillebjørn Nilsen: Portrett	Rolf Kirkvaag	Chateau Neuf	
3rd	15 March 1975	NRK1; NRK P1	No Spellemann of the Year award given	Nora Brockstedt	Alf Cranner: Trykt i år	Jon Anders Helseth	Chateau Neuf	
4th	28 February 1976	NRK1; NRK P1	No Spellemann of the Year award given	Otto Nielsen	Stein Ove Berg: Visa di	Rolv Wesenlund	Chateau Neuf	
5th	26 February 1977	NRK1; NRK P1	No Spellemann of the Year award given	Robert Levin	Ole Paus: I anstendighetens navn	Rolv Wesenlund	Chateau Neuf	
6th	25 February 1978	NRK1; NRK P1	No Spellemann of the Year award given	Toralf Tollefsen	Alf Cranner: Vindkast	Rolv Wesenlund	Oslo Konserthus	
7th	24 February 1979	NRK1; NRK P1	No Spellemann of the Year award given	Erik Bye	Vårsøg: Sola e komma	Arve Tellefsen	Chateau Neuf	
8th	9 February 1980	NRK1; NRK P1	No Spellemann of the Year award given	Reidar Thommessen	Jan Eggum: En sang fra vest	Arve Tellefsen	Chateau Neuf	
9th	7 February 1981	NRK1; NRK P1	No Spellemann of the Year award given	Kari Diesen	Ballade!: Ballade! Ekstranummer	Robert Levin	Chateau Neuf	
10th	6 February 1982	NRK1; NRK P1	No Spellemann of the Year award given	Henning Sommerro	Halvdan Sivertsen: Liv laga	Sven Nyhus	Chateau Neuf	
11th	15 January 1983	NRK1; NRK P1	No Spellemann of the Year award given	Åge Aleksandersen	Lillebjørn Nilsen: Original Nilsen	Åse Kleveland	Chateau Neuf	
12th	7 January 1984	NRK1; NRK P2	No Spellemann of the Year award given	Jahn Teigen	Lars Klevstrand, Hege Tunaal and Ålesund Kammerensemble: Kirans viser	Åse Kleveland	Chateau Neuf	
13th	5 January 1985	NRK1; NRK P2	No Spellemann of the Year award given	Totto Johannessen	Tove Karoline Knutsen: Veintetid	Marianne Krogness	Oslo Konserthus	
14th	16 January 1986	NRK1; NRK P2	A-ha	Bobbysocks, Rolf Løvland and Forente Artister	Halvdan Sivertsen: Amerika	Brødrene Dal	Nova Spektrum	
15th	24 January 1987	NRK1; NRK P2	Sissel Kyrkjebø	A-ha	Henning Sommerro: Neonlys på Ivar Aasen	Arve Tellefsen	Oslo Konserthus	
16th	17 January 1988	NRK1; NRK P2	Jørn Hoel	Dissimilis	Kari Bremnes: Mitt ville hjerte	Rita Westvik	Chateau Neuf	
17th	25 February 1989	NRK1; NRK P2	Det Norske Kammerorkester	Harald Sæverud	Geirr Lystrup: Egg og champagne	Torhild Sivertsen and Tomboy	Oslo Konserthus	
18th	20 January 1990	NRK1; NRK P2	Øystein Sunde	No Honorary Award given	Jørn Simen Øverli: Levende bandasjer	Anne Krigsvoll	Olavshallen	
19th	2 February 1991	NRK1; NRK P2	Gitarkameratene	No Honorary Award given	Gitarkameratene: Typisk norsk	Marie Foss and Torstein Grythe	Chateau Neuf	
20th	8 February 1992	NRK1; NRK P2	Dance with a Stranger	No Honorary Award given	Kari Bremnes: Spor	Knut Borge	Chateau Neuf	
21st	20 February 1993	NRK1; NRK P2	DumDum Boys	Vidar Sandbeck	Vidar Sandbeck: Legende	Knut Borge	Maihaugsalen	
22nd	12 March 1994	NRK1	The September When	No Honorary Award given	Vamp: Godmorgen, søster	Knut Borge	Maihaugsalen	
23rd	4 March 1995	NRK1; NRK P1	Øystein Sunde	No Honorary Award given	Anne Grete Preus: Millimeter	Knut Borge	Håkons Hall	
24th	17 February 1996	NRK1; NRK P1	Morten Harket	Arne Bendiksen	Morten Harket: Wild Seed	Knut Borge	Chateau Neuf	
25th	8 March 1997	NRK1; NRK P1	D.D.E.	Odd Børretzen	Unni Wilhelmsen: To Whom It May Concern	Knut Borge	Oslo Spektrum	
26th	3 April 1998	NRK1; NRK P1	Bjørn Eidsvåg	Lene Nystrøm	No Release of the Year award given	Claus Wiese and Herborg Kråkevik	Chateau Neuf	
27th	19 February 1999	NRK1; NRK P1	Leif Ove Andsnes	Ole Paus	No Release of the Year award given	Claus Wiese and Bjørn Eidsvåg	Oslo Spektrum	
28th	25 February 2000	NRK1; NRK P1	Ole Ivars	Sven Nyhus	No Release of the Year award given	Bård Tufte Johansen and Annbjørg Lien	Oslo Spektrum	
29th	2 March 2001	NRK1	Herborg Kråkevik	A-ha	No Release of the Year award given	Bård Tufte Johansen and Jon Almaas	Oslo Spektrum	
30th	1 March 2002	NRK1	Morten Abel	No Honorary Award given	No Release of the Year award given	Bård Tufte Johansen	Oslo Spektrum	
31st	22 February 2003	TV2	Röyksopp	No Honorary Award given	No Release of the Year award given	Bård Tufte Johansen and Jon Almaas	Oseberg Kulturhus	
32nd	28 February 2004	TV2	Silje Nergaard	No Honorary Award given	No Release of the Year award given	Harald Rønneberg and Thomas Numme	Chateau Neuf	
33rd	26 February 2005	TV2	Odd Nordstoga	No Honorary Award given	No Release of the Year award given	Harald Rønneberg and Thomas Numme	Oslo Spektrum	
34th	28 January 2006	TV2	Madrugada	Terje Rypdal	No Release of the Year award given	Harald Rønneberg and Thomas Numme	Chateau Neuf	
35th	27 January 2007	TV2	Vamp	Åge Aleksandersen, Bjørn Eidsvåg and Sissel Kyrkjebø	No Release of the Year award given	Harald Rønneberg and Thomas Numme	Chateau Neuf	
36th	2 February 2008	TV2	Hellbillies	DumDum Boys	No Release of the Year award given	Harald Rønneberg and Thomas Numme	Oslo Spektrum	
37th	24 January 2009	TV2	Espen Lind	No Honorary Award given	No Release of the Year award given	Harald Rønneberg and Thomas Numme	Oslo Spektrum	
38th	2 February 2010	TV2	Alexander Rybak	Jahn Teigen	No Release of the Year award given	Solveig Kloppen and Ivar "Ravi" Johansen	Oslo Spektrum	
39th	5 March 2011	TV2	Karpe	A-ha	No Release of the Year award given	Solveig Kloppen and Ivar "Ravi" Johansen	Oslo Spektrum	
40th	14 January 2012	NRK1; NRK P3	Jarle Bernhoft	Jan Eggum	No Release of the Year award given	Anne Lindmo	Folketeateret	
41st	23 March 2013	NRK1	Kaizers Orchestra	Karin Krog	No Release of the Year award given	Anne Lindmo	Stavanger Konserthus	
42nd	13 January 2014	NRK1	Ole Paus	Anne Grete Preus	No Release of the Year award given	Anne Lindmo	Stavanger Konserthus	
43rd	17 January 2015	NRK1	Nico & Vinz	Morten Abel	No Release of the Year award given	Jenny Skavlan and Mona B. Riise	Stavanger Konserthus	
44th	17 January 2016	NRK1	Kygo	Tommy Tee	Susanne Sundfør: Ten Love Songs	Jarle Bernhoft and Ingebjørg Bratland	Oslo Spektrum	
45th	28 January 2017	NRK1	Marcus & Martinus	Arve Tellefsen	Karpe: Heisann Montebello	Mona B. Riise	Sentrum Scene	
46th	28 February 2018	NRK1; NRK2	Astrid S	Mari Boine	Cezinando: Noen ganger og andre	Thomas Felberg and Jenny Skavlan	Oslo Konserthus	
47th	30 March 2019	NRK1	Alan Walker	D.D.E.	Emilie Nicolas: Tranquille Emile	Tarjei Strøm and Julie Bergan	Chateau Neuf	
48th	30 April–2 May 2020	NRK1; NRK2	Sigrid	Oslo Philharmonic	Karpe: Sas Plus/Sas Pussy	Tarjei Strøm and Christine Dancke	The awards were held online due to the COVID-19 pandemic	
49th	16 April 2021	NRK1	Tix	Mayhem	No Release of the Year award given	Tarjei Strøm, Silje Nordnes and Sandeep Singh	National Museum of Norway	
50th	22 April 2022	NRK1	Girl in Red	Hellbillies	Girl in Red: If I Could Make It Go Quiet	Tarjei Strøm, Mona B. Riise and Sandeep Singh	Sentralen	
51st	15 April 2023	NRK1	Karpe	Lillebjørn Nilsen	Karpe: Omar Sheriff	Selma Ibrahim and Yosef Wolde-Mariam	H3 Arena	
52nd	4 April 2024	Nettavisen; Amedia	Undergrunn	Ole Ivars	Delara: Shahrazad	Tuva Syvertsen and a member from Ballinciaga	Clarion Hotel The Hub	
53rd	24 April 2025	Nettavisen; Amedia	Marstein	Maj Britt Andersen	Gabrielle: Og Eg Lyger Så Det Renner Som en Foss Gjennom Rommet	Thomas Numme and Harald Rønneberg	Clarion Hotel The Hub	

== Categories and winners ==
=== Honorary Award (Grand Prize) ===
- 1973: Egil Monn-Iversen
- 1974: Sigbjørn Bernhoft Osa
- 1975: Nora Brockstedt
- 1976: Otto Nielsen
- 1977: Robert Levin
- 1978: Toralf Tollefsen
- 1979: Erik Bye
- 1980: Reidar Thommessen
- 1981: Kari Diesen
- 1982: Henning Sommerro
- 1983: Åge Aleksandersen
- 1984: Jahn Teigen
- 1985: Totto Johannessen
- 1986: Bobbysocks, Rolf Løvland and Forente Artister
- 1987: A-ha
- 1988: Dissimilis
- 1989: Harald Sæverud

No Honorary Award given (1990–1992)

- 1993: Vidar Sandbeck

No Honorary Award given (1994–1995)

- 1996: Arne Bendiksen
- 1997: Odd Børretzen
- 1998: Lene Nystrøm
- 1999: Ole Paus
- 2000: Sven Nyhus
- 2001: A-ha

No Honorary Award given (2002–2005)

- 2006: Terje Rypdal
- 2007: Åge Aleksandersen, Bjørn Eidsvåg and Sissel Kyrkjebø
- 2008: DumDum Boys

No Honorary Award given (2009)

- 2010: Jahn Teigen
- 2011: A-ha
- 2012: Jan Eggum
- 2013: Karin Krog
- 2014: Anne Grete Preus
- 2015: Morten Abel
- 2016: Tommy Tee
- 2017: Arve Tellefsen
- 2018: Mari Boine
- 2019: D.D.E.
- 2020: Oslo Philharmonic
- 2021: Mayhem
- 2022: Hellbillies
- 2023: Lillebjørn Nilsen
- 2024: Ole Ivars
- 2025: Maj Britt Andersen

=== Release of the Year (Grand Prize) ===
- 1973: Birgitte Grimstad – Shown by Geirr Tveitt
- 1974: Lillebjørn Nilsen – Portrett
- 1975: Alf Cranner – Trykt i år
- 1976: Stein Ove Berg – Visa di
- 1977: Ole Paus – I anstendighetens navn
- 1978: Alf Cranner – Vindkast
- 1979: Vårsøg – Sola e komma
- 1980: Jan Eggum – En sang fra vest
- 1981: Ballade! – Ballade! Ekstranummer
- 1982: Halvdan Sivertsen – Liv laga
- 1983: Lillebjørn Nilsen – Original Nilsen
- 1984: Lars Klevstrand, Hege Tunaal and Ålesund Kammerensemble – Kirans viser
- 1985: Tove Karoline Knutsen – Veintetid
- 1986: Halvdan Sivertsen – Amerika
- 1987: Henning Sommerro – Neonlys på Ivar Aasen
- 1988: Kari Bremnes – Mitt ville hjerte
- 1989: Geirr Lystrup – Egg og champagne
- 1990: Jørn Simen Øverli – Levende bandasjer
- 1991: Gitarkameratene – Typisk norsk
- 1992: Kari Bremnes – Spor
- 1993: Vidar Sandbeck – Legende
- 1994: Vamp – Godmorgen, søster
- 1995: Anne Grete Preus – Millimeter
- 1996: Morten Harket – Wild Seed
- 1997: Unni Wilhelmsen – To Whom It May Concern

No Release of the Year award given (1998–2015)

- 2016: Susanne Sundfør – Ten Love Songs
- 2017: Karpe – Heisann Montebello
- 2018: Cezinando – Noen ganger og andre
- 2019: Emilie Nicolas – Tranquille Emile
- 2020: Karpe – Sas Plus/Sas Pussy

No Release of the Year award given (2021)

- 2022: Girl in Red – If I Could Make It Go Quiet
- 2023: Karpe – Omar Sheriff
- 2024: Delara – Shahrazad
- 2025: Gabrielle – Og Eg Lyger Så Det Renner Som en Foss Gjennom Rommet

=== Songwriter of the Year ===
- 2019: Ina Wroldsen
- 2020: Larsiveli
- 2021: Cezinando
- 2022: Girl in Red
- 2023: Karpe
- 2024: Skaar
- 2025: Girl in Red and Matías Téllez

=== Producer of the Year ===
- 2010: Yngve Sætre
- 2011: Stargate
- 2016: Susanne Sundfør
- 2017: Cashmere Cat – "Trust Nobody", "Wild Love", "Frank's Track" and "All I Know"
- 2018: Ole Torjus Hofvind – Cezinando: Noen ganger og andre
- 2019: Aksel Carlson
- 2020: Martin Sjølie
- 2021: Matias Téllez – songs produced in 2020
- 2022: Cashmere Cat – songs produced in 2022
- 2023: Aksel Axxe Carlson and Thomas Meyer – Kongshavn
- 2024: Fay Wildhagen – Anne Grete Preus: Møtested - en hyllest til Anne Grete Preus
- 2025: Matías Téllez – Aurora: What Happened to the Heart?, Astrid S: Joyride and Girl in Red: I'm Doing It Again Baby!

=== Breakthrough of the Year ===
- 1990: Matchstick Sun
- 1991: CC Cowboys

No Breakthrough of the Year award given (1992–1993)

- 1994: Trine Rein
- 1995: Weld
- 1996: Green Cortinas
- 1997: Helén Eriksen
- 1998: Locomotives
- 1999: Bertine Zetlitz
- 2000: Lene Marlin
- 2001: Briskeby
- 2002: Sondre Lerche
- 2003: Gåte
- 2004: Julian Berntsen
- 2005: Annie
- 2006: Marthe Valle
- 2007: 120 Days
- 2008: Tine Thing Helseth
- 2009: Ida Maria
- 2010: Donkeyboy
- 2011: Kvelertak
- 2012: Jonas Alaska
- 2013: Lido
- 2014: Monica Heldal
- 2015: Emilie Nicolas
- 2016: Aurora
- 2017: Astrid S
- 2018: Sigrid
- 2019: Boy Pablo
- 2020: Isah
- 2021: Musti
- 2022: Hagle
- 2023: Undergrunn
- 2024: Emma Steinbakken
- 2025: Ari Bajgora

=== International Success of the Year ===
- 2009: Madcon
- 2016: Kygo
- 2017: Alan Walker
- 2018: Ina Wroldsen
- 2019: Stargate
- 2020: Lise Davidsen
- 2021: Girl in Red
- 2022: Aurora
- 2023: Peder Elias
- 2024: Erik Smaaland
- 2025: Vilde Frang

=== TONO's Composer Award ===
- 2016: Ørjan Matre – Peter Herresthal & Stavanger Symfoniorkester: Ørjan Matre: Presage & violin concerto
- 2017: Gjermund Larsen – Gjermund Larsen Trio: Salmeklang

No TONO's Composer Award given (2018)

- 2019: Ørjan Matre – Oslo Filharmonien: Konsert for orkester
- 2020: Helge Iberg – Helge Iberg: Songs from the Planet of Life
- 2021: Daniel Herskedal – Call For Winter
- 2022: Tora Augestad, Diego Lucchesi, Bergen Philharmonic Orchestra, Edward Gardner and Henrik Hellstenius – Henrik Hellstenius: Past & Presence
- 2023: Inger Hannisdal
- 2024: Anne Hytta – Brigde
- 2025: Kristine Tjøgersen

=== TONO's Lyricist Award ===
- 2025: Marstein

=== Song of the Year ===
- 2025: Kygo – "Whatever" (with Ava Max)

=== Music Video of the Year ===
- 1987: A-ha – "Hunting High and Low"
- 2000: Babel Fish – "Light of Day"
- 2001: A-ha – "Velvet"
- 2002: Röyksopp – "Epple"
- 2003: Röyksopp – "Remind Me"
- 2004: Kaizers Orchestra – "Evig Pint"
- 2005: Margaret Berger – "Lifetime Guarantee"
- 2006: Robert Post – "Got None"
- 2007: Marit Larsen – "Don't Save Me"
- 2008: Dimmu Borgir – "The Serpentine Offering"
- 2009: Madcon – "Liar"
- 2010: Donkeyboy – "Ambitions"
- 2011: Yoga Fire – "Superkul med kniv"
- 2012: Envy – "One Song"
- 2013: Kaizers Orchestra – "Begravelsespolka"
- 2016: Karpe – "Hvite menn som pusher 50"
- 2017: Aurora – "I Went Too Far"
- 2018: Daniel Kvammen – "Som om himmelen revna" (featuring Lars Vaular)
- 2019: Hkeem – "Ghettoparasitt"
- 2020: Anna of the North – "Leaning On Myself"
- 2021: B-boy Myhre – "Gammel Person" (featuring Cezinando)
- 2022: Sei Selina – "Only When You're Asleep"
- 2023: Ramón – "Så Klart Det Gjør Vondt"
- 2024: Lars Vaular – "Impro på Økern (Scene 3: Highlights)"
- 2025: Honningbarna – "Avanti"

=== Alternative Pop ===
==== Indie ====
- 2014: Young Dreams – Between Places
- 2015: Thea Hjelmeland – Solar Plexus
- 2016: The Megaphonic Thrift – Sun stare sound
- 2017: The Switch – The Switch Album
- 2018: Silja Sol – Ni liv
- 2019: Thea Hjelmeland – Kulla

==== Indie/Alternative ====
- 2020: Konradsen – Saints and Sebastian Stories
- 2021: Okay Kaya – Watch This Liquid Pour Itself

==== Alternative Pop/Rock ====
- 2022: Ola Kvernberg – Steamdome II: The Hypogean
- 2023: Sondre Lerche – Avatars of Love
- 2024: Oda Felicia – First Act (The Huntington Chorea Project)

==== Alternative Pop ====
- 2025: Girl in Red – I'm Doing It Again Baby!

=== Blues ===
- 2024: Kid and Lisa Andersen - Spirits and Souls

=== Classical ===
- 2020: Eldbjørg Hemsing, Simon Trpceski - Grieg: Violin Sonatas
- 2024: Eldbjørg Hemsing - Hillborg: Violin Concerto No. 2/Liquid Marble

=== Party Music ===
==== 2021 ====
- Nominee: Jone - Jone 2021

2022

- Festmusikk: Beathoven – Beathoven 2022 (collected works)

=== Pop ===
==== 2016 ====
- Pop Soloist: Susanne Sundfør – Ten Love Songs

==== 2017 ====
- Pop Group: Highasakite – Camp Echo
- Pop Soloist: Aurora – All My Demons Greeting Me as a Friend

==== 2018 ====
- Pop Group: Seeb – songs released in 2017
- Pop Soloist: Cashmere Cat – 9

==== 2019 ====
- Pop Artist: Emilie Nicolas – Tranquille Emile
- Pop Group: Band of Gold – Where's the Magic

==== 2020 ====
- Pop Artist: Sigrid – Sucker Punch
- Pop Group: Seeb – songs released in 2019

==== 2021 ====
- Pop: Annie – Dark Hearts

==== 2022 ====
- Pop: Gabrielle – Klipp Meg I Ti og Lim Meg Sammen

==== 2023 ====
- Pop: Karpe – Omar Sheriff

==== 2024 ====
- Pop: Cezinando – Sprengkulde

==== 2025 ====
- Pop: Golfklubb – songs released in 2024
