= Kamelen =

Norwegian rapper (born 1993)

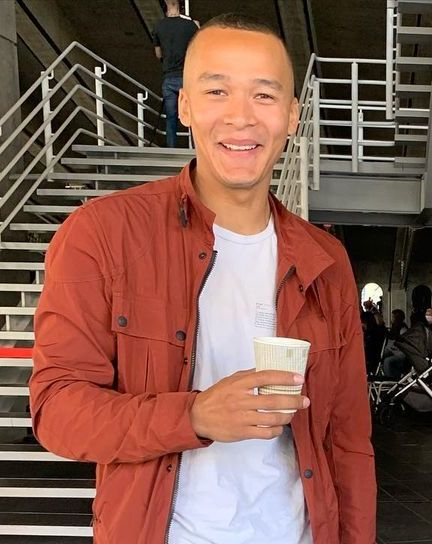
- Kamelen in August 2021
- Born: Marcus Kabello Møll Mosele; 1993 (age 32–33); Bergen
- Citizenship: Norway
- Occupations: rapper; musician
- Years active: 2014–
- Father: Banjo Mosele
- Awards: Spellemannprisen in hiphop (2021)

Marcus Kabelo Møll Mosele (born 1993), also known under the stage name Slim Kamel or Kamelen, is a Norwegian rapper from Bergen.

The rapper became famous when he escaped from police custody in 2015 at the same time as he released the single "Si Ingenting" (English: Say Nothing). He signed a contract with the rap collective and record label NMG/G-Huset, and in 2017 he released the album Ambivalent. He was nominated for the Spellemannprisen 2018 in the year's breakthrough class with Gramostipend. Ahead of P3 Gull 2021, he was nominated for the categories artist of the year and song of the year for "Creme de la crème". He won the Spellemannprisen 2021 in the class hip-hop for overall production from 2021.

== Biography ==
He grew up in Bergen. Mosele's youth was turbulent without a father present, and he was sent early to a special school for youth with behavioral difficulties. Mosele himself describes his upbringing as nice, but with a lot of "nonsense and fanfare".

In 2014, Mosele was sentenced to two years in prison for two episodes of violence, where, among other things, he hit a random passerby in the head with cobblestone. Mosele escaped on his way to custody, but was arrested by police during a performance at a pub in Bergen two months later.

In 2018, the police stopped a concert where Mosele performed. Several people, including Mosele, were arrested. The arrest took place after he allegedly shouted "transl. fuck the police" from the stage. Among other things, cocaine was found on the Mosele during the incident. After initially refusing a summons of NOK 12,000, he was sentenced in Kristiansand district court on 23 September 2020 to pay a fine of NOK 8,000 and NOK 2,000 in court costs.

== Discography ==
=== Albums ===
- Ambivalent (2017)
- Kingpin Slim (2019)
- #Frikjent (2021)

=== EP ===
- Lyca (2018)

=== Singles ===
- "Si ingenting" (2015)
- "Kjeltring" (2016)
- "Beng beng beng" (2017)
- "D e digg" (2017)
- "Lil Homie" (2018)
- "Hon e fin" (2018)
- "Lyca" (2018)
- "Vil ba vekk" (2019)
- "Ba spis" (2019)
- "Tilbake i City" (2020)
- "Ferrari" (2020)
- "Creme de la creme" (2021)
- "BAP" (with Broiler and Emma Steinbakken) (2022)
- "Fakk min X" (with Ballinciaga) (2022)

== Film and TV ==
In 2022, the documentary Si ingenting (English: Say nothing) about the artist became the most watched documentary in Norwegian cinemas.

In the same year, he played roles in the fiction series Verden er min and Rykter.
