= Tore Halvorsen (singer) =

Norwegian dansband musician (born 1949)

- Born: Tore Halvorsen; October 13, 1949 (age 75); Rendalen, Norway
- Occupations: Musician; singer; guitarist
- Years active: 1970s–present
- Musical career
- Genres: Dansband
- Instruments: Vocals; guitar
- Formerly of: Ole Ivars; Katho

Tore Halvorsen born October 13, 1949, in Rendalen, Norway is a Norwegian musician. He is best known as the former lead vocalist of Ole Ivars and Katho. He is considered Norway's most famous Dansband musician and as having contributed to its rise in popularity.

He was a member of Katho during the 1970s and 1980s. In 1988, he became a member of Ole Ivars, where he would serve as their lead vocalist until 2018. He released his first solo album in 2020.

== Discography ==
Singles

- Lykkeliten (2012)
- Julekveld (2013), with Helge Støholen
- Dronninga av campingplassen (2015), with Borderland

Albums

- Godt å se deg igjen (2020)

=== Ole Ivars ===
- Jubileums-swing (1989)
- JulJul (1989)
- Bære musikk (1990)
- På en-to-tre (1991)
- Lørdagskveld (1992)
- Spellemannsblod (1993)
- Kavalkade 40 låter gjennom 30 år (1994)
- Ole Ivars aller beste (1995)
- Juleplata tel Ole Ivars (1995)
- Dans på Skjermertopp (1996)
- På cruise og tvers (1998)
- Ole Ivars 20 beste (1999)
- Ole Ivars i 2000 (1999)
- Medisin mot det meste (2000)
- Gull (2000)
- En får væra som en er (2001)
- 40 Beste (2002)
- Hverdag & fest (2003)
- Ole Ivars' Jul (2003)
- Gull 2 (2004)
- Heldiggriser (2004)
- Vi tar det tel manda'n (2005)
- Ole Ivars så klart! (2006)
- Fri Willy (2006)
- Jag trodde änglarna fanns (2007)
- Vi lever i håpet (2007)
- Hålligånglåtarna (2008)
- Platina (2008)
- Femten ferske (2009)
- Stjerneklart (2010)
- 34 (2011)
- Rett fra hjertet (2011)
- Julefest med Ole Ivars (2011)
- Guttetur & gledeshus (2012)
- Ole Ivars 50 år (2013)
- Takk for alle fine år (2014)
- På konsert med Ole Ivars – Live fra Selfestivalen (2014)
- Alle Ole Ivars-originalene fra musikalen «En får væra som en er» (2015)
- Fosser'n (2016)

=== Katho ===
- Her kommer Katho (1974)
- Katho 2 – venter på deg (1975)
- Dagen er din (1977)
- Nærbilde (1978)
- En dag av gangen (1980)
- Natten kommer (1981)
- Godt å se deg igjen (1983)
- Dagen er vår (2005)

=== 3 gode venner ===
- Live at Gran Canaria (2013)

=== Various events ===
- 12 Ess : 12 Ess (1975)
- Gluntan : Gluntan's Musikk-Café (1992)
- Kikki Danielsson : I mitt hjärta (1999)
- Bob Marley -hyllest: Inn fra kulda: Bob Marley på norsk (2001)
- Julio Lindex Orkester : Jag är din pappa – Live at Driv (2001)
- Big Box : Norske danseband Vol. 2 (2005)
- Kikki Danielsson : I dag & i morgon (2006)
- Tylden & co : På dansefot 5 (2007)
- Melodi Grand Prix 2008 (2008)
- Landeplage (2008)
- Kikki Danielsson : Kikkis bästa (2008)
- Musikk i Hedmark : Musikk i Hedmark (2009)
- Kikki Danielsson (2009)
- Grammofon : Alle våre barnefavoritter (2012)
- Grammofon : Godnattsanger for de minste (2013)
- Tylden & co : Jul i bygda (2014)
- Runar & Steffen Duo : Kjeks, kaffe og rock'n'roll (2015)
