= Kjartan Lauritzen =

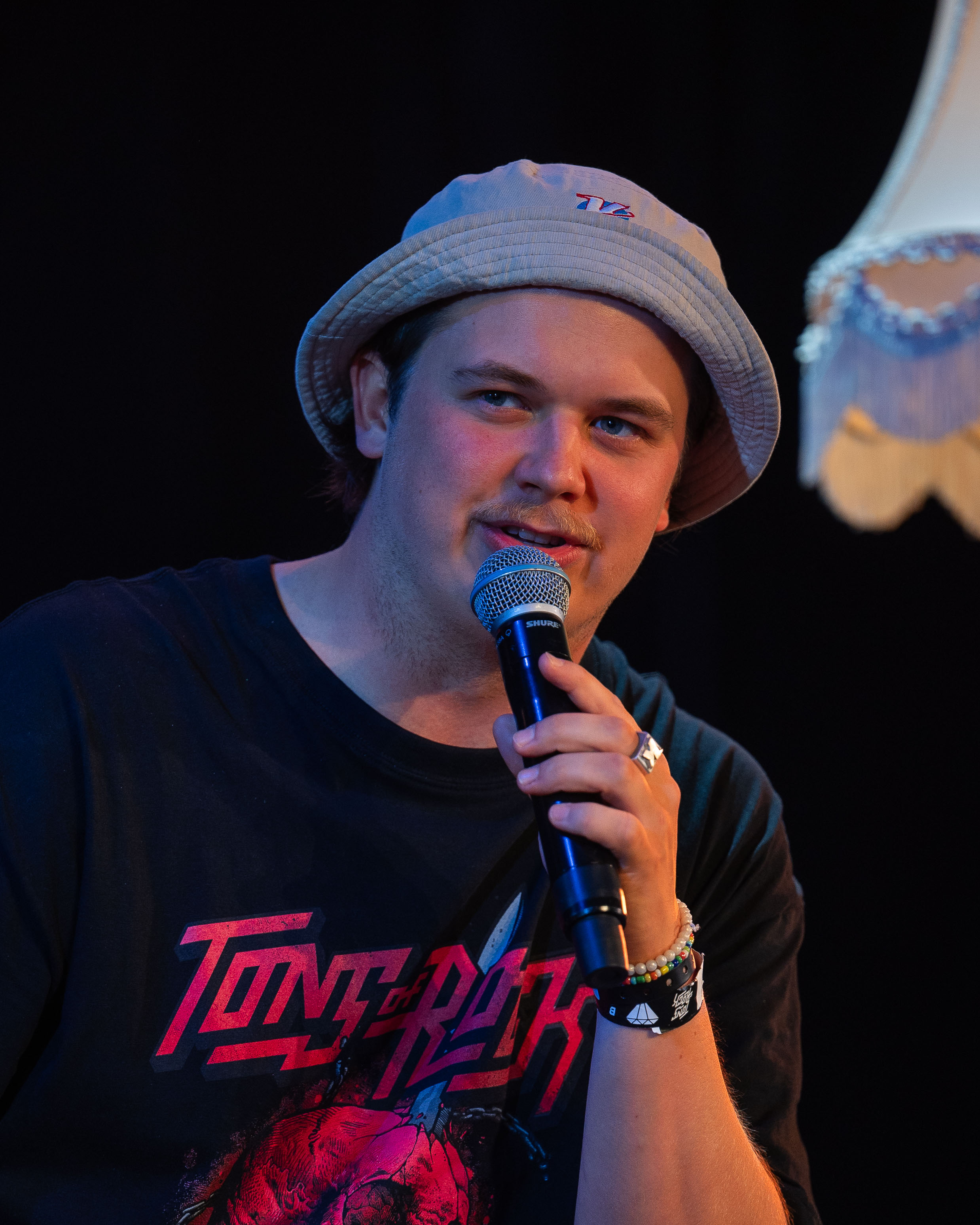
- At the Tons of Rock festival, Oslo, 2025; Photo: Birgit Fostervold

Background information
- Born: Per Áki Sigurdsson Kvikne; 12 January 1995 (age 31); Balestrand, Sogn og Fjordane, Norway

Per Áki Sigurdsson Kvikne (born 12 January 1995), known professionally as Kjartan Lauritzen, is a Norwegian musician.

Lauritzen owns the Balestrand Hotel in Balestrand with his girlfriend Randi Sognnæs Aamot. They met at Høyanger High School.

== Early life ==
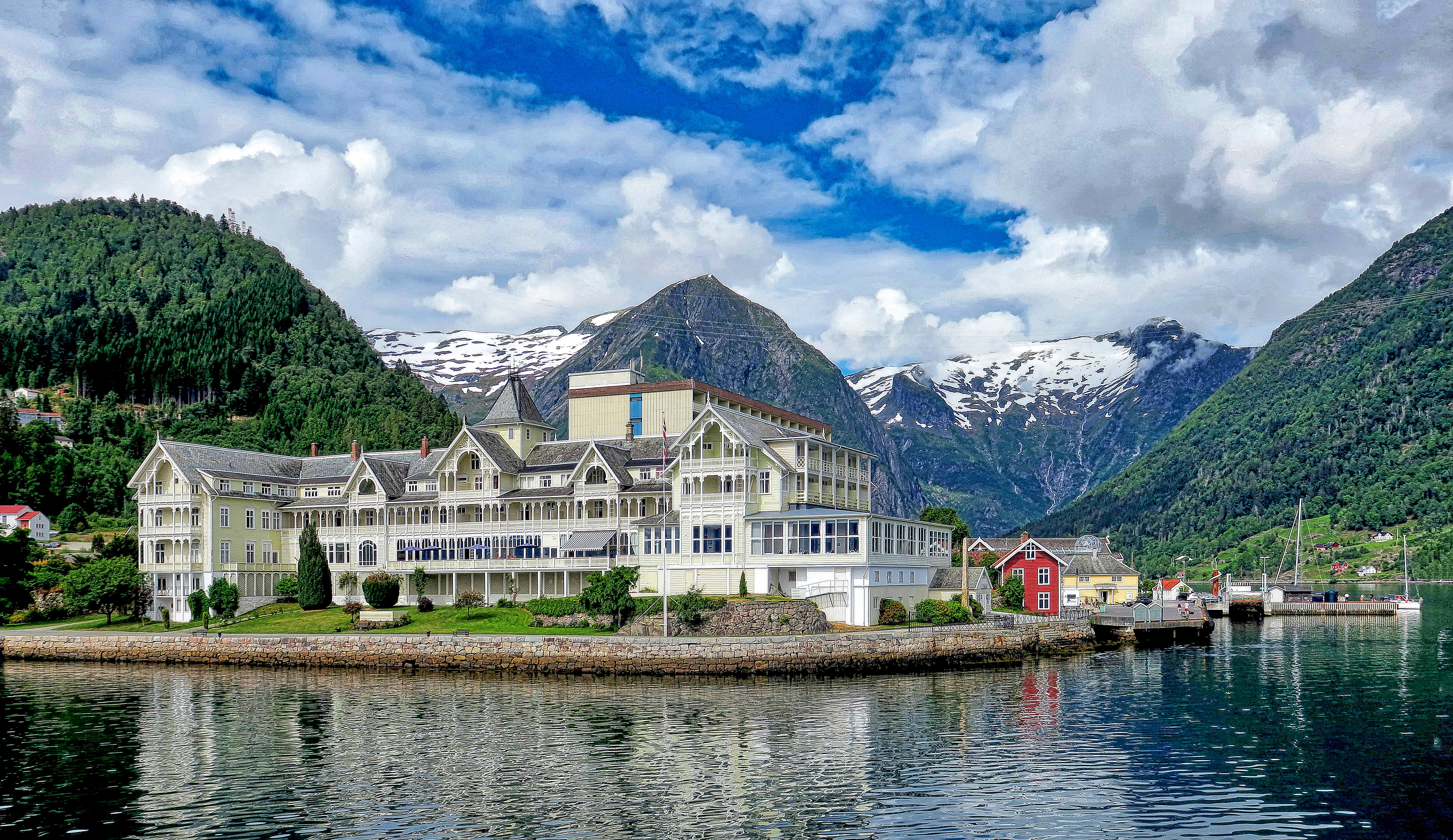
Kviknes Hotel in 2020

Per Áki Sigurdsson Kvikne was born on 12 January 1995 in Balestrand Municipality in Sogn og Fjordane, Norway to Maria Ragnarsdottir and Sigurd Kvikne. His family have owned the Kviknes Hotel since 1877.

Lauritzen attended Høyanger High School from 2010 to 2011 before moving to Voss High School in 2011 until 2013.

== Discography ==
- Fenomenet
- Game Boy
- Kjartanisme
