= Ballinciaga =

Norwegian musical group

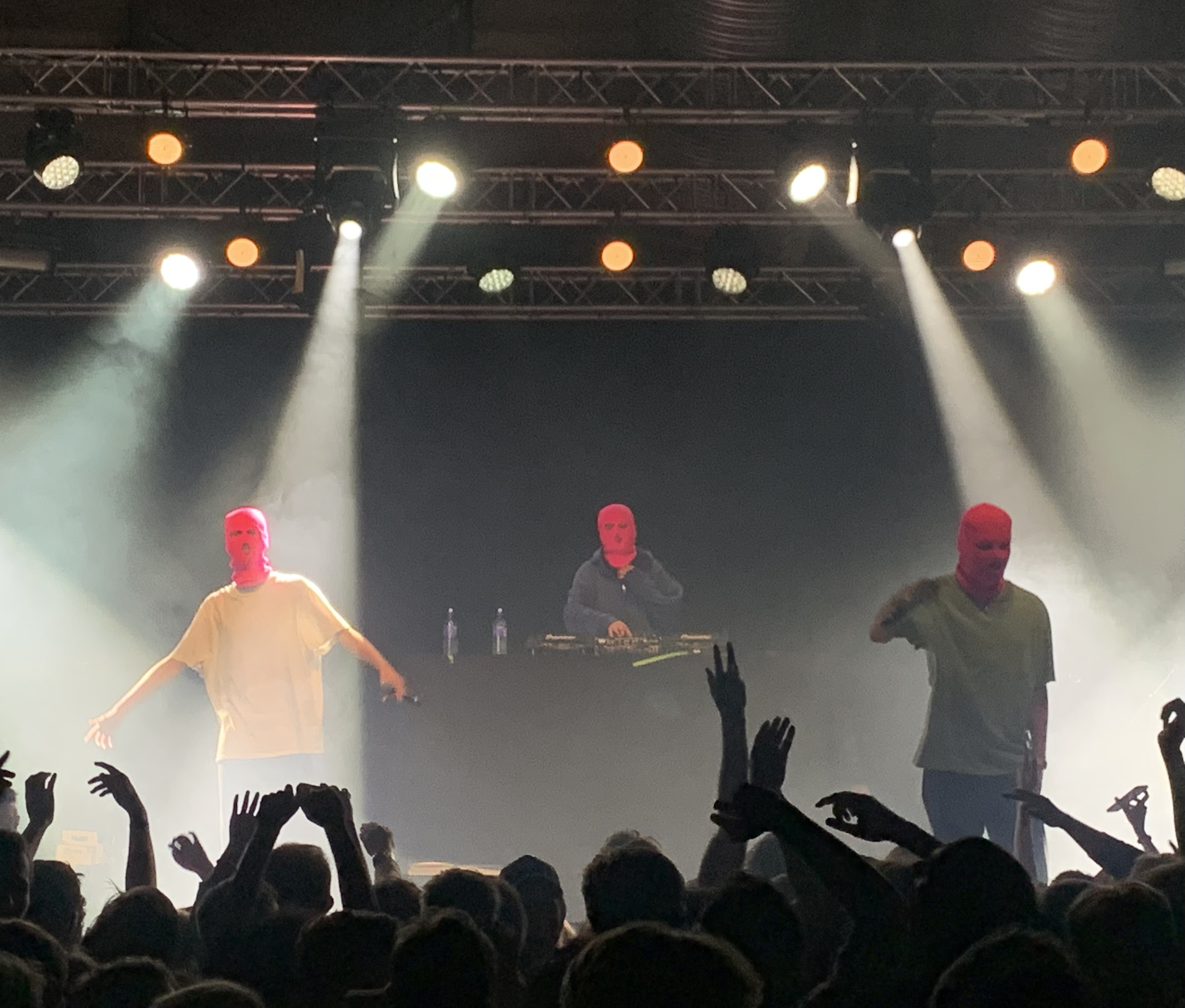
- Ballinciaga concert at Fjellhallen, 2022

Background information
- Origin: Oslo, Norway
- Genres: Pop; electropop; dance-pop; russ music
- Years active: 2018–present
- Members: Mikkel Brunvatne Henriksen; Thomas Alexander Strandskogen; Victor Karlsen Klæbo
- Website: ballin.no

Ballinciaga is a Norwegian music group consisting of Mikkel Brunvatne Henriksen, Thomas Alexander Strandskogen, and Victor Karlsen Klæbo, known for wearing pink balaclavas. Their songs and performances include influences of electronic music and dance pop. The group has amassed multiple entries on the Norwegian charts, including three songs which peaked at number one, namely "Dans på bordet" with David Mokel, "Fakk min X" with rapper Kamelen, and "Sigg".

== Career ==
Ballinciaga consists of three men who cover their faces with pink balaclavas with eye slits. Initially, the band members kept their identities a secret. Later, it was revealed that the members are Mikkel Brunvatne Henriksen, Thomas Alexander Strandskogen, and Victor Karlsen Klæbo.

Ballinciaga started out early with releasing russ music (russelåter) in 2018. They stated that russ music was initially intended as a side project to make money, but they also planned to make "proper music." However, due to their success, they eventually focused entirely on russ music. Over time, the trio stopped naming their commissioned songs after the client, as was typical for the genre, instead only adding the client’s name in parentheses next to the song titles.

In 2021, Ballinciaga was able to land in the Norwegian music charts for the first time, with the song "Hot Boy Summer". They had their major commercial breakthrough with the single "Loud Luxury 2022" together with Norwegian rapper Kevin Lauren, which peaked at number two. The group later achieved their first number one single on the Norwegian singles chart in 2022 with the song "Dans på bordet" featuring David Mokel. In May 2023, the trio released their debut album Postkort Alicante, which consists of nine tracks. The album debuted at number one on the Norwegian album charts.

The group also participated in NRK's Debatten in 2022, discussing graduation celebrations in relation to the COVID-19 pandemic and russ music.

In 2023, the group launched the alcoholic drink Kald Hard Seltzer, but was criticised for having "exploitative and cynical marketing", which violated the ban on alcohol advertising that exists in Norway. In February 2025, the Norwegian Directorate of Health found that the group had committed a number of serious violations under the Alcohol Act. The group was therefore fined 2.4 million NOK.

== Discography ==
=== Studio albums ===
List of studio albums, with selected chart positions and details
Title	Details	Peak chart positions
Title	Details	NOR
Postkort Alicante	Released: 26 May 2023; Label: Universal, Virgin; Formats: Digital download, streaming	1
Eden	Released: 9 May 2025; Label: Universal; Formats: Digital download, streaming	9

=== Singles ===
==== Charted singles ====
List of charting singles, with selected peak chart positions and certifications
Title	Year	Peak chart positions		Certifications	Album or EP
Title	Year	NOR	SWE	Certifications	Album or EP
"Hot Boy Summer"	2021	18	—		Non-album singles
"Loud Luxury 2022" (with Kevin Lauren)	2021	2	—		Non-album singles
"Dans på bordet" (with David Mokel)	2022	1	—		Non-album singles
"Tante" (with Kevin Lauren)	2022	3	—	IFPI NOR: 2× Platinum	Non-album singles
"Beklager (Guttaklubben)" (with Kris Winther)	2022	2	—		Non-album singles
"Kjære alkohol (Hall of Fame)" (featuring Roc Boyz)	2022	2	—	IFPI NOR: Platinum	Non-album singles
"Block Party" (with Adaam)	2022	10	—	IFPI NOR: Platinum	Non-album singles
"Fakk min X" (with Kamelen)	2022	1	—		Non-album singles
"En Shot"	2023	4	—		Non-album singles
"Dumme Kids" (with 1.Cuz)	2023	8	—		Non-album singles
"Minne for livet" (with Golfklubb)	2023	9	—		Non-album singles
"Igjen og igjen"	2023	8	—		Non-album singles
"Dance" (with Arif Murakami)	2024	11	—		Non-album singles
"Baby" (with Arif Murakami)	2024	13	—		Non-album singles
"Sigg"	2024	1	42		Non-album singles
"Ayt"	2024	2	—		Non-album singles
"Prty" (with Nossan)	2025	10	—		Non-album singles
"Fairytale" (with Alexander Rybak)	2025	49	—		Non-album singles
"—" denotes a recording that did not chart or was not released in that territory.

==== As featured artist ====
Title	Year	Album or EP
"Bråkmaker - Hjemmesnekk" (Kusekompaniet and Konebank featuring Ballinciaga)	2019	Non-album single

=== Other charted songs ===
Title	Year	Peak chart positions	Album or EP
Title	Year	NOR	Album or EP
"Kjære 2045"	2023	11	Postkort Alicante
"Leve"	2023	2	Postkort Alicante
"Døra"	2023	12	Postkort Alicante
"Om vi bare..."	2023	9	Postkort Alicante
"Vi mot verden"	2023	17	Postkort Alicante
"God dag"	2023	22	Postkort Alicante
"Cognac"	2025	31	Eden

== Awards and nominations ==
Year	Award	Category	Work	Result	Ref.
2022	Spellemannprisen	Breakthrough of the Year	Ballinciaga	Nominated	
2022	Spellemannprisen	Song of the Year	"Dans på bordet" (with David Mokel)	Nominated	
2022	P3 Gull	Song of the Year	"Dans på bordet" (with David Mokel)	Nominated	
2022	P3 Gull	Artist of the Year	Ballinciaga	Nominated	
2024	Spellemannprisen	Music Video of the Year	"Ayt: The Movie"	Nominated	
