= Jørn Hoel =

Norwegian composer, guitarist and singer (born 1957)

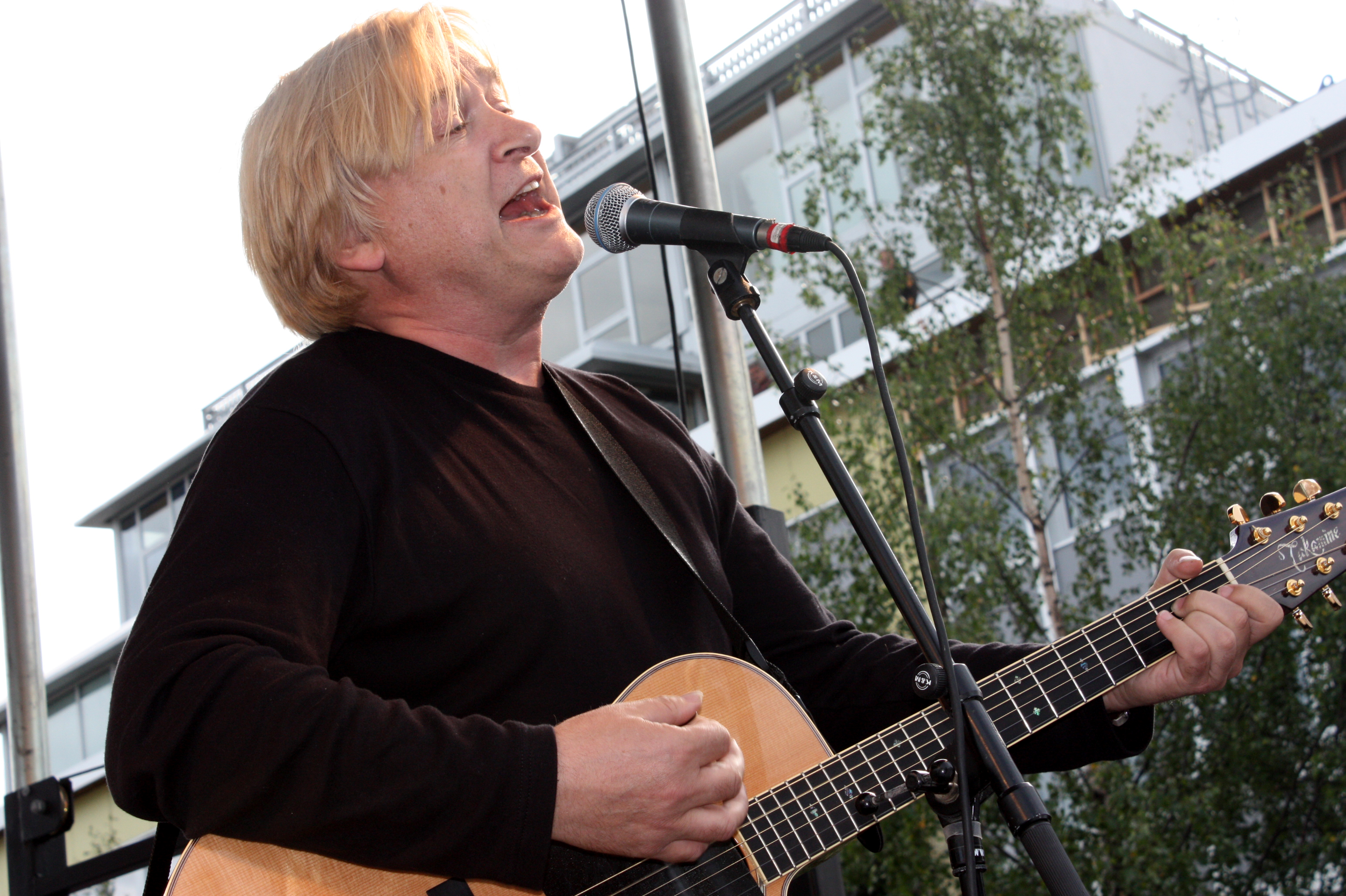
Jørn Hoel

Jørn Hoel (born 27 July 1957) is a Norwegian composer, guitarist and singer.

Hoel was born in Tromsø. His album debut was Ubarbert from 1982, and the album Varme ut av is from 1987 earned him Spellemannprisen. Among his best known songs are "Ei hand å holde i" and "Har en drøm". Later albums are Leapin' Lizards from 1994 and Soulsville from 1996, which chartered number one on VG-lista.
