= Bjørn Eidsvåg =

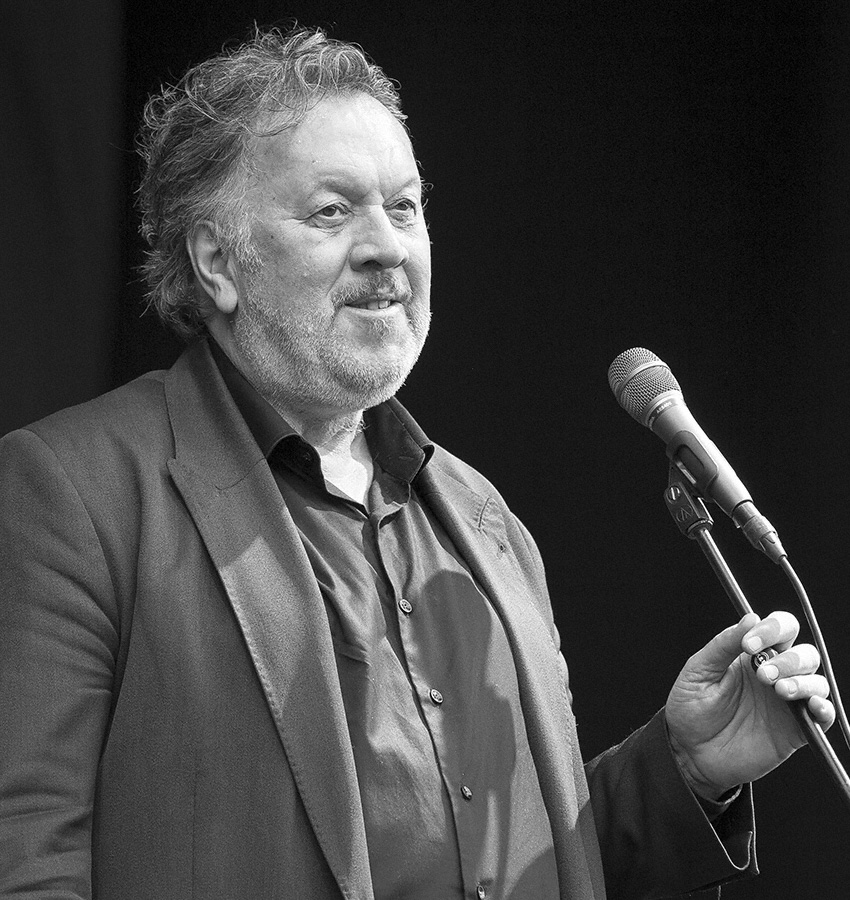
- Eidsvåg at Stavernfestivalen in 2016

Background information
- Born: 17 March 1954 (age 72); Sauda Municipality, Norway
- Genres: Pop, rock
- Occupations: Singer, songwriter
- Instrument: Guitar
- Years active: 1975–present
- Labels: Kirkelig Kulturverksted, FOR-X, Norsk, Petroleum

Bjørn Eidsvåg (born 17 March 1954) is a Norwegian pop singer, songwriter, and ordained Lutheran minister. He was born in Sauda Municipality, and is a graduate of the MF Norwegian School of Theology. He has released more than 25 albums since his 1976 debut and received the Norwegian music award the Spellemannsprisen at least three times.

== Discography ==
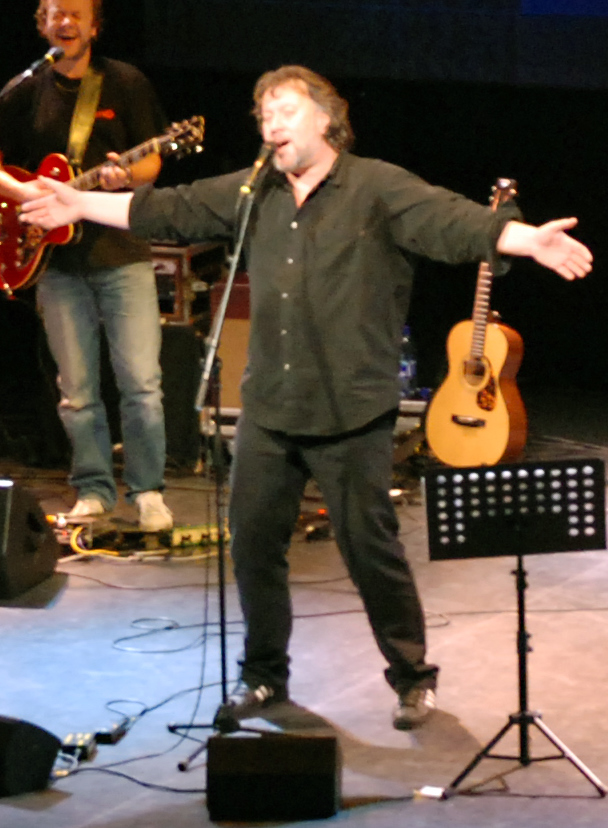
Bjørn Eidsvåg

=== Albums ===
Year	Album	Peak positions	Sales	Certifications
Year	Album	NOR	Sales	Certifications
1976	Inn for Landing			
1978	Bakerste Benk			
1980	Endelig Voksen			
1981	Live in Ny York (Live)			
1983	Passe Gal			
1984	På Leit			
1985	Bjørn's beste			
1985	Dansere i Natten	13		
1988	Vertigo	10		
1990	Tatt Av Vinden	3		
1990	Alt Du Vil Ha	11		
1992	Til alle Tider	9		
1993	Allemannsland	4		
1995	Landet Lenger Bak	2		NOR: 2× Platinum
1997	På Svai	1		NOR: Platinum
1999	Tapt Uskyld	2		NOR: Gold
2000	Hittil og Littil (Live)	4		NOR: 2× Platinum
2000	Tålt	1	NOR: 200,000	NOR: 5× Platinum
2003	En Vakker Dag	1		NOR: Platinum
2006	Nåde	1		
2008	Pust	1		
2008	De beste (compilation)	2		
2010	Rundt neste sving	1		
2013	Far faller	1		
2014	Klassisk Bjørn Eidsvåg	2		
2016	Etterlyst: Jesus			

Albums (Denmark)

Year	Album	Peak positions
Year	Album	DEN
2004	Skyfri Himmel	28

=== Singles ===
(Selective. Charting in VG-lista Norwegian Singles Chart)

Year	Title	Peak positions	Album
Year	Title	NOR	Album
2006	"Floden"	1	Nåde
2008	"Eg ser"	13	
2008	"E du den du e"	18	
2010	"Nede for telling"	20	Rundt neste sving
2023	"Skal ikke gråte"	20	Hver gang vi møtes
2023	"Drukne" (with Emma Steinbakken)	38	Hver gang vi møtes
2026	"I takt med deg" (with Zimmermann)	1	
