= Marstein (rapper) =

Norwegian rapper (born 2002)

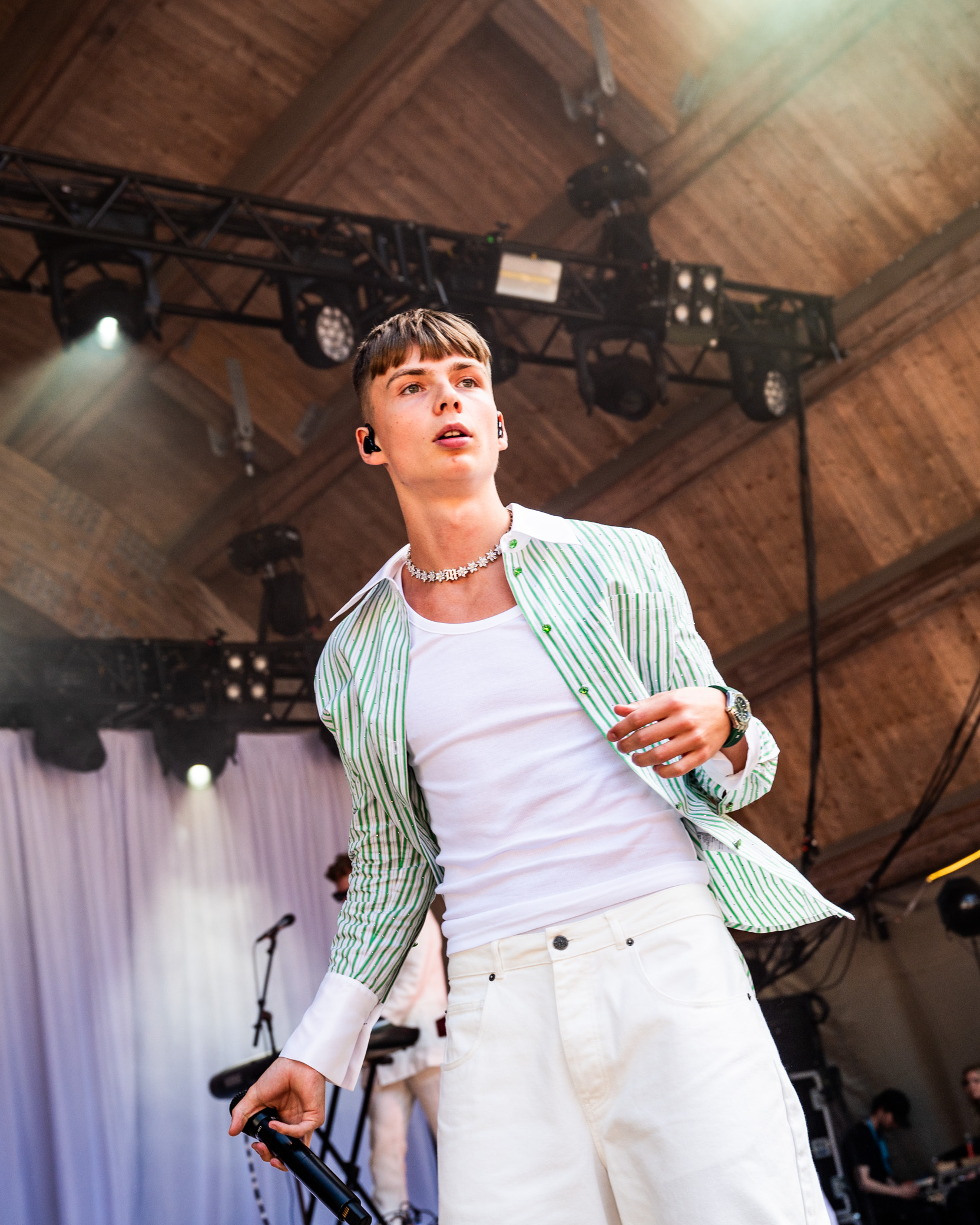
- Marstein in 2024

Background information
- Born: Jo Almaas Marstein; 25 October 2002 (age 23); Oslo, Norway
- Origin: Oslo, Norway
- Genre: Hip-hop
- Occupations: Rapper; songwriter

Jo Almaas Marstein (born 25 October 2002), known mononymously as Marstein, is a Norwegian rapper from Kampen in Oslo. He began his music career in his teens as a member of the rap group Undergrunn.

== Career ==
In September 2022, he debuted as a solo artist with the EP Medici Marstein and the single "Frida Kahlo", which reached number one on the Norwegian singles chart. Later that year, he released the EP Xania. Marstein ble nominert til årets artist og årets låt for «Sommerhus» under P3 Gull 2023.

In 2024, he released the album Frihet i lenker , which includes contributions from violinist Tuva Halse and drummer Omar Hakim. The album was described in media reviews as characterized by musical maturity and lyrical depth. At the Spellemannprisen 2024, he was named winner of the Spellemann of the Year Award, in addition to winning the hip hop and TONO's lyricist awards. He was also nominated for songwriter of the year with Kastel, as well as song of the year with Annika Wedderkopp for "Sammen". He was nominated for P3 Gull 2025 in the categories artist of the year and song of the year for "Sammen" with Wedderkopp.

== Personal life ==
Jo Almaas Marstein is the son of author Bjørn Esben Almaas (born 1975) and novelist and translator Trude Marstein (born 1973).

== Discography ==
=== Solo albums ===
- 2022: Medici Marstein
- 2022: Xania – EP
- 2024: Frihet i Lenker
- 2026: Yap.

=== With Undergrunn ===
- 2020: Firenze's finest
- 2021: Buketter & ballspill
- 2022: Undergrunn
- 2023: Egoland
- 2024: Norge Elsker Rap
- 2025: Memoarer
