= Undergrunn =

Music band in Norway

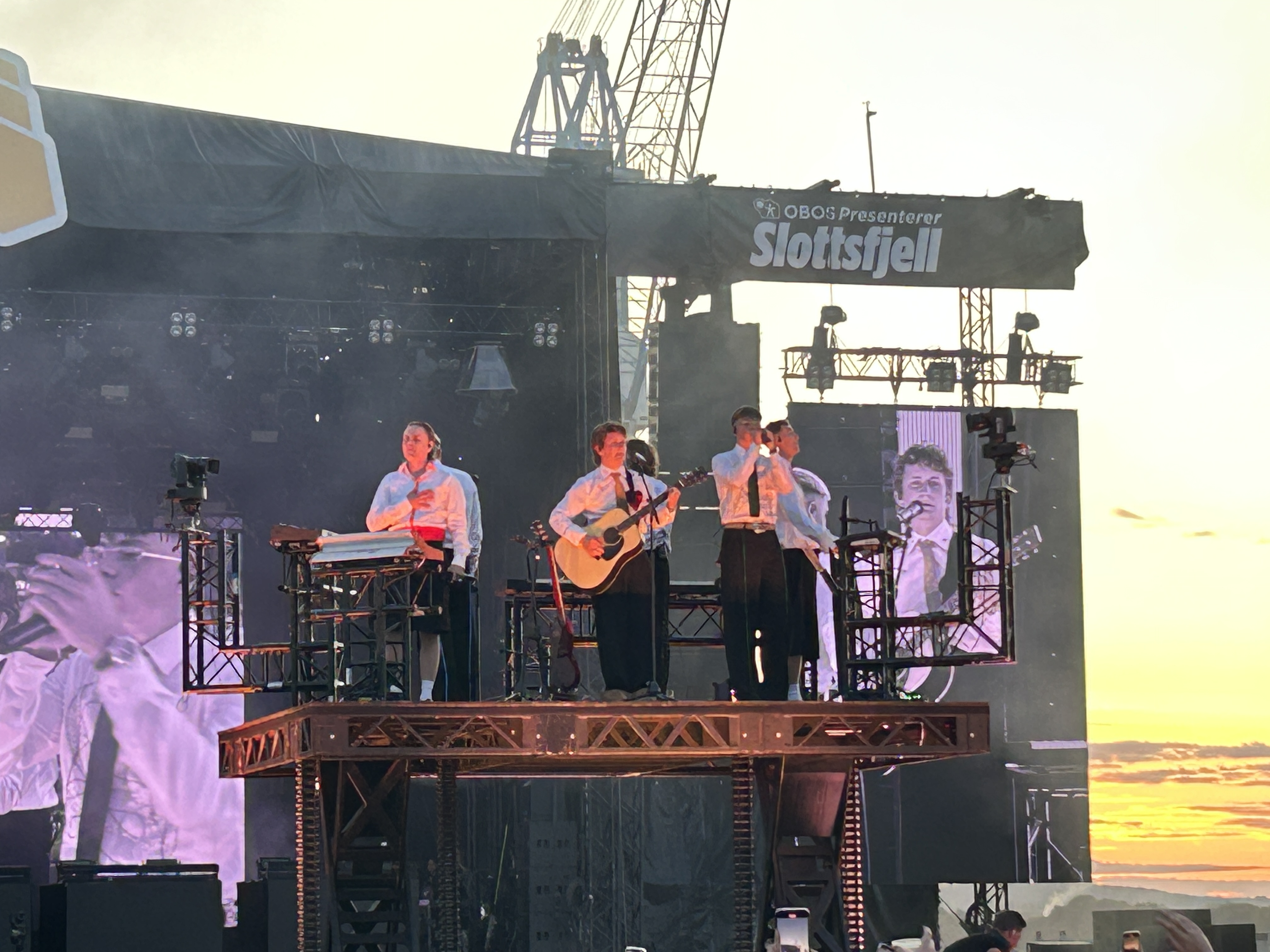
- Undergrunn at Slottsfjellfestivalen in 2025

Background information
- Origin: Oslo, Norway
- Genres: Hip hop
- Years active: 2018 – present
- Label: Universal Music Group
- Members: Patrick Bakkeng (Fretex); Gabriel Doria (Plaza); Marcos Haugestad (Rikpappa); Sverre Skogheim Gudmestad (Pus); Jo Almaas Marstein (Marstein); Jon Ranes (Loverboy)

Undergrunn is a Norwegian boy band that was formed in Oslo in 2018. The band consists of six members: Patrick Bakkeng (Fretex), Gabriel Doria (Plaza), Sverre Skogheim Gudmestad (Pus), Jo Almaas Marstein (Marstein), Jon Ranes (Loverboy) and Marcos Haugestad (Rikpappa).

== History ==
Growing up in Tøyen and Gamlebyen in Oslo, Undergrunn came together to create music during secondary school. At 15, they debuted with the song "Isbil," leading to an appearance on By:Larm. The group released their EP UG Sommer in 2018.

Their first album, Firenze's Finest, was released in autumn 2020. They received two nominations for P3 Gold 2022, including Artist of the Year and Song of the Year for "Italia." Undergrunn won the year's breakthrough class for the album Undergrunn at the Spellemannprisen 2022, along with four additional nominations in categories such as hip-hop, songwriter of the year, the release of the year for the album Undergrunn, and song of the year for "Italia."

Undergrunn has emerged as one of Norway's most prominent rap groups, known for their unique sound and impactful lyrics. Since their formation, they have blended traditional rap with various musical styles, allowing them to resonate with a broad audience. Recently, they were honored with the Edvard-Prisen for their contribution to the music scene, highlighting their innovative approach and the significance of their work. Their ability to address contemporary social issues while maintaining a relatable and authentic voice has gained them a loyal fan base, further solidifying their position in the industry.

The group’s rise to fame is marked by their performances at numerous music festivals across Norway, including Neon Festival and Slottsfjell. These appearances have showcased their energetic stage presence and connection with fans, further solidifying their reputation in the Norwegian music scene.

== Discography ==
=== Studio albums ===
- Memoarer (2025)
- Egoland (2023)
- Undergrunn (2022)
- Buketter & ballspill (2021)
- Firenze's Finest (2020)
- (mixtape) (2019)

=== EPs ===
- UG Sommer (2018)

=== Singles ===
- "Bedre enn deg" (2018)
- "Isbil" (2018)
- "Logogutt" (2019), only on SoundCloud
- "Presidenter $$$" (2019)
- "Trapmobile" (2020)
- "Savner min klikk" (2020)
- "Risiko" (2021)
- "Han Solo" (2021)
- "Peroni & Perignon" (2022)
- "Klikk" (2023)
- "Norge Elsker Rap" (2024)
