= Ramón (Norwegian singer) =

Norwegian musical artist (born 1998)

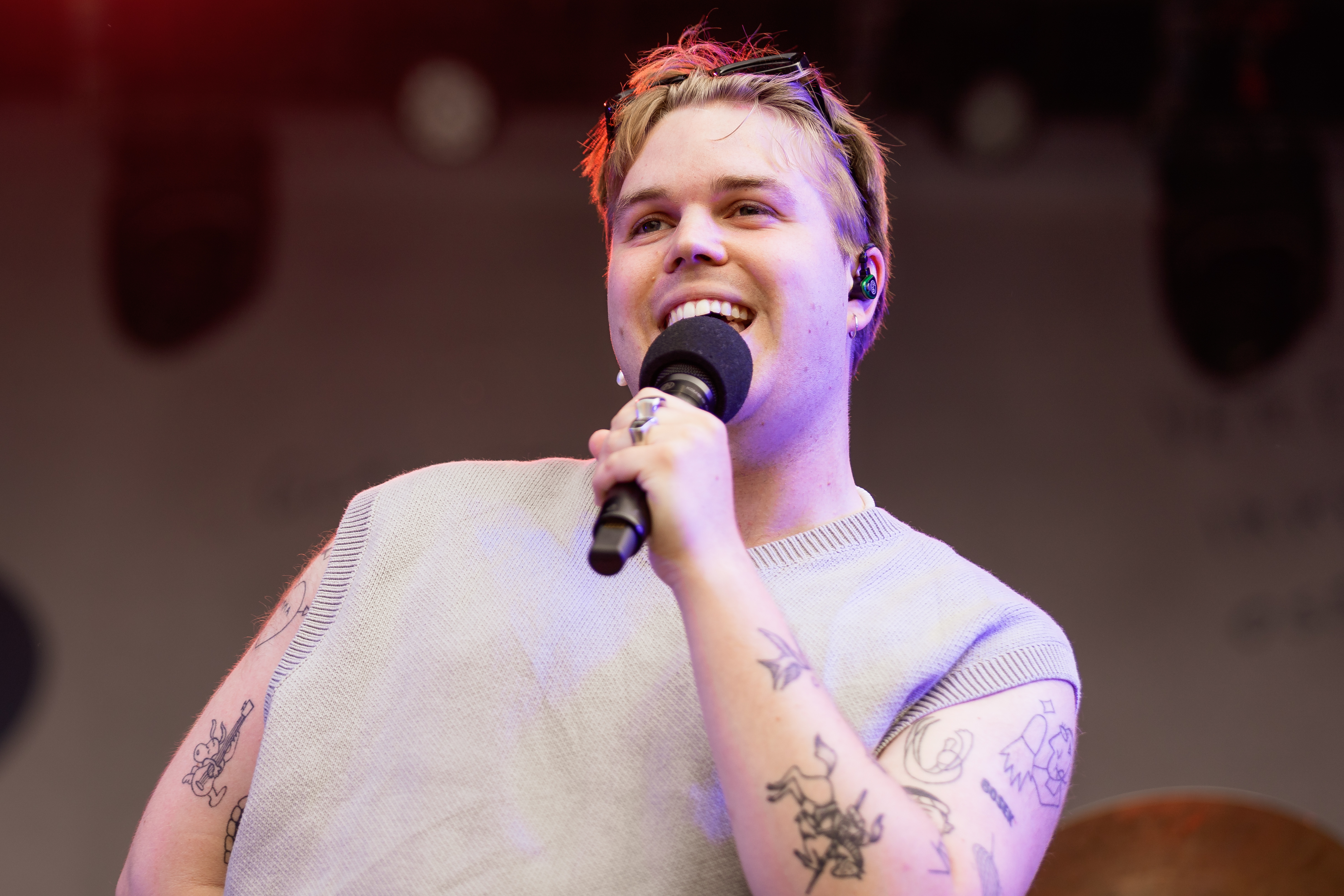
- Ramón performing in 2022; Photo: Tore Sætre

Background information
- Born: Ramón Torres Andresen; November 17, 1998 (age 27)
- Origin: Ski, Akershus, Norway
- Occupations: Musician, singer-songwriter
- Instrument: Singing
- Website: https://ramonofficial.com/

Ramón Torres Andresen (born 1998) is a Norwegian singer-songwriter. He is known for the song "ok jeg lover" (ok I promise) and the follow-up song "17. mai".

== Education and career ==
Andresen is from Ski, Norway. He went to Ski Upper Secondary School, and studied songwriting and production at Kristiania University College.

In 2016 he participated in the talent program The Stream, where he came in fifth place. He signed with Warner Music later the same year. The next year, he sang the 2017 BlimE! song, "Venn" ("Friend"), together with TRXD.

In 2020 he released the EP Hvis jeg våkner opp igjen (If I Wake Up Again), and in 2021 the EP Smile pent, stå i ro (Smile Pretty, Stand Still) was released.

Andresen went viral on the video-sharing app TikTok in the summer of 2021, with a video of him talking about his "swimming problem". As of October 31st 2022 the video has 2,7 million views.

On 10 June 2022 he and Victor Leksell released the single "Leilo brenner" ("The apartment is burning") together. The song was recorded at one of the Spotify studios in Stockholm. A week later Andresen performed at VG-Lista Rådhusplassen, together with Viktor Leksell.

February 2022 he experienced huge success with the single "Ok jeg lover" ("Ok I promise"), which broke the record for most Spotify plays within a day in Norway, with 605 000 plays. He released his debut album Så klart det gjør vondt (Of course it hurts) on 30 September 2022, with Universal Music. The album placed number one on the Norwegian official record chart, VG-lista. It was well received by the public, but received a mixed critical reception.

== Personal life ==
Andresen lives in Grünerløkka, Oslo. He identifies as gay, and married his current husband Herman Henriksen in the summer of 2026. They met on the dating app Tinder, and Henriksen works in the entertainment industry as well.
