= Emma Steinbakken =

Norwegian singer (born 10 March 2003)

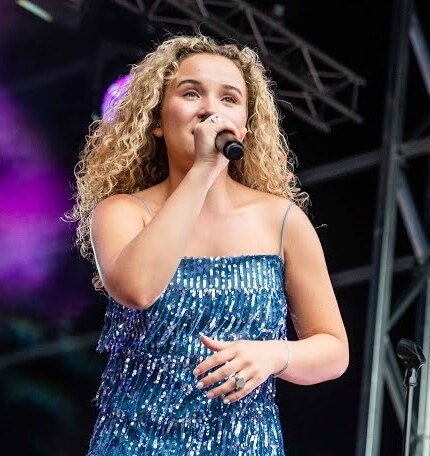
- Steinbakken in 2023
- Born: Emma Steinbakken; 10 March 2003 (age 23); Jessheim, Norway
- Occupations: Singer; songwriter
- Years active: 2017–present
- Musical career
- Genre: Pop
- Label: Little Big Music

Emma Steinbakken (born 10 March 2003) is a Norwegian singer from Jessheim. She has released the songs "Not Gonna Cry" (2019) and "Without You". She performed on Swedish and Norwegian television as a guest on Fredrik Skavlan's talk show Skavlan in 2019.

== Discography ==
=== Albums ===
List of albums, with selected chart positions
Title	Details	Peak chart positions
Title	Details	NOR
Home	Released: 23 June 2023; Label: Columbia; Formats: Digital download, streaming, vinyl	2
Emmas jul	Released: 22 November 2024; Label: ADA Nordic; Formats: Digital download, streaming	3
Døtre som meg	Released: 9 October 2026; Label: Warner Music Norway; Formats: Digital download, streaming	6

=== Singles ===
List of singles, with selected chart positions
Title	Year	Peak chart positions		Album / EP
Title	Year	NOR	IDN	Album / EP
"Without You"	2019	—	—	Non-album singles
"Young"	2019	—	—	Non-album singles
"Not Gonna Cry"	2019	—	—	Emma Steinbakken
"Never Forgiving"	2019	—	—	Emma Steinbakken
"Let's Blow Our Feelings Up with Dynamite"	2020	—	—	Non-album singles
"Dance"	2020	—	—	Non-album singles
"September"	2020	—	—	Non-album singles
"Wow" (with Matoma)	2020	—	—	Non-album singles
"Stay with Me" (From the Original Netflix Series Home for Christmas Season 2)	2020	—	—	Non-album singles
"Jeg glemmer deg aldri (fra Rådebank)"	2021	1	—	Non-album singles
"Self"	2021	—	—	Non-album singles
"Sorry"	2021	36	—	Non-album singles
"Not You" (with Alan Walker)	2021	—	4	World of Walker
"Hopelessly Hopeless"	2022	23	—	Non-album singles
"This One's on Me"	2022	29	—	Non-album singles
"Floden"	2022	1	—	Hver gang vi møtes
"BlimE"	2023	15	—	Hver gang vi møtes
"For vår jord"	2023	9	—	Hver gang vi møtes
"Show Me"	2023	25	—	Hver gang vi møtes
"Delilah"	2023	1	—	Hver gang vi møtes
"Mysteriet deg"	2023	5	—	Hver gang vi møtes
"Drukne" (with Bjørn Eidsvåg)	2023	38	—	Hver gang vi møtes
"Parents"	2023	15	—	Home
"Home"	2023	15	—	Home
"Evig og alltid" (with Vinni)	2023	33	—	Non-album single
"Used to Love You"	2023	17	—	Home
"Cold"	2023	39	—	Home
"Hold My Breath"	2023	12	—	Non-album singles
"Peace"	2023	40	—	Non-album singles
"Hjemme for meg"	2023	29	—	Non-album singles
"Himmel på jord"	2024	18	—	Emmas jul
"Alle vil til himmelen" (with Synne Vo)	2025	3	—	Non-album singles
"Lommeringe" (with Synne Vo)	2026	6	—	Non-album singles
"For alltid type ting"	2026	25	—	Døtre som meg
"Noen pappaer er flinkere enn andre"	2026	77	—	Døtre som meg
"Verdens beste mann"	2026	50	—	Døtre som meg
"ILU"	2026	19	—	Døtre som meg
"Kvelden før kvelden"	2026	54	—	Non-album single

=== Other charted songs ===
List of other charted songs, with selected chart positions
Title	Year	Peak chart positions	Album
Title	Year	NOR	Album
"Deilig er jorden"	2024	85	Emmas jul
"Stjernesludd"	2024	24	Emmas jul
"En stjerne skinner i natt"	2024	53	Emmas jul
