= List of number-one albums in Norway =

This list shows all the albums that have been number one on the official chart list in Norway, VG-lista. The albums chart started as a top 20 chart in week 1, 1967 and was later expanded to a top 40 chart.

== 2005 ==
Week	Artist	Album title
1	Jay-Z and Linkin Park	Collision Course
2	Green Day	American Idiot
3	Green Day	American Idiot
4	Green Day	American Idiot
5	John Legend	Get Lifted
6	Tord Gustavsen Trio	The Ground
7	Ane Brun	A Temporary Dive
8	Ane Brun	A Temporary Dive
9	The Mars Volta	Frances the Mute
10	Madrugada	The Deep End
11	Madrugada	The Deep End
12	Kent	Du & jag döden
13	Queens of the Stone Age	Lullabies to Paralyze
14	Kent	Du & jag döden
15	Øystein Sunde	Sånn er'e bare
16	Bigbang	Poetic Terrorism
17	Åge Aleksandersen	To skritt frem
18	Various Artists	Idol 2005
19	Various Artists	Idol 2005
20	Various Artists	Idol 2005
21	Various Artists	Idol 2005
22	Audioslave	Out of Exile
23	Various Artists	Melodi Grand Prix Junior 2005
24	Coldplay	X&Y
25	deLillos	Festen er ikke over... det er kake igjen!
26	Ravi & DJ Løv	Den nye arbeidsdagen
27	Röyksopp	The Understanding
28	Ravi & DJ Løv	Den nye arbeidsdagen
29	Ravi & DJ Løv	Den nye arbeidsdagen
30	Ravi & DJ Løv	Den nye arbeidsdagen
31	Ravi & DJ Løv	Den nye arbeidsdagen
32	Ravi & DJ Løv	Den nye arbeidsdagen
33	Ravi & DJ Løv	Den nye arbeidsdagen
34	Kaizers Orchestra	Maestro
35	James Blunt	Back to Bedlam
36	James Blunt	Back to Bedlam
37	James Blunt	Back to Bedlam
38	James Blunt	Back to Bedlam
39	James Blunt	Back to Bedlam
40	Katie Melua	Piece by Piece
41	Alejandro Fuentes	Diamonds or Pearls
42	Alejandro Fuentes	Diamonds or Pearls
43	Depeche Mode	Playing the Angel
44	Vamp	Siste stikk
45	Vamp	Siste stikk
46	a-ha	Analogue
47	Madonna	Confessions on a Dance Floor
48	Madonna	Confessions on a Dance Floor
49	Madonna	Confessions on a Dance Floor
50	Madonna	Confessions on a Dance Floor
51	Madrugada	Live at Tralfamadore
52	Madrugada	Live at Tralfamadore

== 2006 ==
Week	Artist	Album title
1	Madrugada	Live at Tralfamadore
2	Madrugada	Live at Tralfamadore
3	Madrugada	Live at Tralfamadore
4	Madrugada	Live at Tralfamadore
5	Madrugada	Live at Tralfamadore
6	Madrugada	Live at Tralfamadore
7	Madrugada	Live at Tralfamadore
8	Madrugada	Live at Tralfamadore
9	Madrugada	Live at Tralfamadore
10	Olsenbandet Jr.	Olsenbanden Jr. på cirkus
11	David Gilmour	On an Island
12	Dum Dum Boys	Gravitasjon
13	Dum Dum Boys	Gravitasjon
14	Dum Dum Boys	Gravitasjon
15	Dum Dum Boys	Gravitasjon
16	Dum Dum Boys	Gravitasjon
17	Dum Dum Boys	Gravitasjon
18	Bruce Springsteen	We Shall Overcome: The Seeger Sessions
19	Tool	10,000 Days
20	Red Hot Chili Peppers	Stadium Arcadium
21	Mark Knopfler and Emmylou Harris	All the Roadrunning
22	Bruce Springsteen	We Shall Overcome: The Seeger Sessions
23	Mark Knopfler and Emmylou Harris	All the Roadrunning
24	Bruce Springsteen	We Shall Overcome: The Seeger Sessions
25	Kurt Nilsen, Espen Lind, Askil Holm and Alejandro Fuentes	Hallelujah – Live
26	Kurt Nilsen, Espen Lind, Askil Holm and Alejandro Fuentes	Hallelujah – Live
27	Kurt Nilsen, Espen Lind, Askil Holm and Alejandro Fuentes	Hallelujah – Live
28	Kurt Nilsen, Espen Lind, Askil Holm and Alejandro Fuentes	Hallelujah – Live
29	Kurt Nilsen, Espen Lind, Askil Holm and Alejandro Fuentes	Hallelujah – Live
30	Kurt Nilsen, Espen Lind, Askil Holm and Alejandro Fuentes	Hallelujah – Live
31	Bruce Springsteen	We Shall Overcome: The Seeger Sessions
32	Bruce Springsteen	We Shall Overcome: The Seeger Sessions
33	Bruce Springsteen	We Shall Overcome: The Seeger Sessions
34	Kurt Nilsen, Espen Lind, Askil Holm and Alejandro Fuentes	Hallelujah – Live
35	Kurt Nilsen, Espen Lind, Askil Holm and Alejandro Fuentes	Hallelujah – Live
36	Bob Dylan	Modern Times
37	Kurt Nilsen, Espen Lind, Askil Holm and Alejandro Fuentes	Hallelujah – Live
38	Kurt Nilsen, Espen Lind, Askil Holm and Alejandro Fuentes	Hallelujah – Live
39	Thomas Dybdahl	Science
40	Kurt Nilsen, Espen Lind, Askil Holm and Alejandro Fuentes	Hallelujah – Live
41	Kurt Nilsen, Espen Lind, Askil Holm and Alejandro Fuentes	Hallelujah – Live
42	Kurt Nilsen, Espen Lind, Askil Holm and Alejandro Fuentes	Hallelujah – Live
43	Bjørn Eidsvåg	Nåde
44	Vamp	I full symfoni
45	Vamp	I full symfoni
46	Vamp	I full symfoni
47	Jan Werner	Stronger
48	Bjørn Eidsvåg	Nåde
49	Bjørn Eidsvåg	Nåde
50	Bjørn Eidsvåg	Nåde
51	Bjørn Eidsvåg	Nåde
52	Bjørn Eidsvåg	Nåde

== 2007 ==
Week	Artist	Album title
1	Sivert Høyem & The Volunteers	Exiles
2	Westlife	The Love Album
3	Westlife	The Love Album
4	Westlife	The Love Album
5	Westlife	The Love Album
6	Norah Jones	Not Too Late
7	Amy Winehouse	Back to Black
8	Amy Winehouse	Back to Black
9	Amy Winehouse	Back to Black
10	Amy Winehouse	Back to Black
11	Amy Winehouse	Back to Black
12	D.D.E.	No går det så det suse
13	Bigbang	Too Much Yang
14	Magnet	The Simple Life
15	Mika	Life in Cartoon Motion
16	Mika	Life in Cartoon Motion
17	Mika	Life in Cartoon Motion
18	Mika	Life in Cartoon Motion
19	Dimmu Borgir	In Sorte Diaboli
20	Björk	Volta
21	Linkin Park	Minutes to Midnight
22	Linkin Park	Minutes to Midnight
23	Linkin Park	Minutes to Midnight
24	Various Artists	Melodi Grand Prix Junior 2007
25	Traveling Wilburys	The Traveling Wilburys Collection
26	Traveling Wilburys	The Traveling Wilburys Collection
27	Traveling Wilburys	The Traveling Wilburys Collection
28	Traveling Wilburys	The Traveling Wilburys Collection
29	Postgirobygget	Tidløs
30	Johnny Logan and Friends	The Irish Connection
31	Johnny Logan and Friends	The Irish Connection
32	Johnny Logan and Friends	The Irish Connection
33	Johnny Logan and Friends	The Irish Connection
34	Johnny Logan and Friends	The Irish Connection
35	Paul Potts	One Chance
36	Raga Rockers	Übermensch
37	Raga Rockers	Übermensch
38	Raga Rockers	Übermensch
39	Henning Kvitnes	Stemmer i gresset
40	Henning Kvitnes	Stemmer i gresset
41	Bruce Springsteen	Magic
42	Bruce Springsteen	Magic
43	Hellbillies	Spissrotgang
44	Hellbillies	Spissrotgang
45	Eagles	Long Road Out of Eden
46	Eagles	Long Road Out of Eden
47	Eagles	Long Road Out of Eden
48	Led Zeppelin	Mothership
49	Secret Garden	Inside I'm Singing
50	Secret Garden	Inside I'm Singing
51	Secret Garden	Inside I'm Singing
52	Secret Garden	Inside I'm Singing

== 2008 ==
Week	Artist	Album title
1	Robert Plant and Alison Krauss	Raising Sand
2	Robert Plant and Alison Krauss	Raising Sand
3	Garth Brooks	The Ultimate Hits
4	Garth Brooks	The Ultimate Hits
5	Madrugada	Madrugada
6	Madrugada	Madrugada
7	Madrugada	Madrugada
8	Madrugada	Madrugada
9	Kaizers Orchestra	Maskineri
10	Michael Jackson	Thriller 25
11	Sorgen og Gleden	Matte Marit
12	Ane Brun	Changing of the Seasons
13	Sorgen og Gleden	Matte Marit
14	Sorgen og Gleden	Matte Marit
15	R.E.M.	Accelerate
16	Vassendgutane	XO
17	Vassendgutane	XO
18	Kurt Nilsen	Rise to the Occasion
19	Kurt Nilsen	Rise to the Occasion
20	Kurt Nilsen	Rise to the Occasion
21	Kurt Nilsen	Rise to the Occasion
22	Kurt Nilsen	Rise to the Occasion
23	Morten Harket	Letter from Egypt
24	Morten Harket	Letter from Egypt
25	Lasse Stefanz	Rallarsväng
25	Coldplay	Viva la Vida or Death and All His Friends
26	Coldplay	Viva la Vida or Death and All His Friends
27	Espen Lind	Army of One
28	Espen Lind	Army of One
29	Kurt Nilsen	Rise to the Occasion
30	Various Artists	Mamma Mia! The Movie Soundtrack
31	Various Artists	Mamma Mia! The Movie Soundtrack
32	Various Artists	Mamma Mia! The Movie Soundtrack
33	Various Artists	Mamma Mia! The Movie Soundtrack
34	Various Artists	Mamma Mia! The Movie Soundtrack
35	Various Artists	Mamma Mia! The Movie Soundtrack
36	Various Artists	Mamma Mia! The Movie Soundtrack
37	Various Artists	Mamma Mia! The Movie Soundtrack
38	Metallica	Death Magnetic
39	Metallica	Death Magnetic
40	Metallica	Death Magnetic
41	Metallica	Death Magnetic
42	Various Artists	Mamma Mia! The Movie Soundtrack
43	Marit Larsen	The Chase
44	AC/DC	Black Ice
45	AC/DC	Black Ice
46	Vamp	St. Mandag
47	Vamp	St. Mandag
48	Bjørn Eidsvåg	Pust
49	The Killers	Day & Age
50	The Priests	The Priests
51	The Priests	The Priests
52	The Priests	The Priests

== 2009 ==
Week	Artist	Album title
1	The Priests	The Priests
2	The Killers	Day & Age
3	Il Divo	The Promise
4	Various Artists	Dansband Kampen 2008
5	Kari Bremnes	Ly
6	Bruce Springsteen	Working on a Dream
7	Bruce Springsteen	Working on a Dream
8	Bruce Springsteen	Working on a Dream
9	Bruce Springsteen	Working on a Dream
10	Bruce Springsteen	Working on a Dream
11	U2	No Line on the Horizon
12	Bigbang	Edendale
13	Bigbang	Edendale
14	Röyksopp	Junior
15	Bigbang	Edendale
16	Neil Young	Fork in the Road
17	Eriksen	De aller beste
18	Eriksen	De aller beste
19	Kaizers Orchestra	Våre demoner
20	Eriksen	De aller beste
21	Green Day	21st Century Breakdown
22	Eminem	Relapse
23	Alexander Rybak	Fairytales
24	Alexander Rybak	Fairytales
25	Kurt Nilsen, Espen Lind, Askil Holm & Alejandro Fuentes	Hallelujah Live – Volume 2
26	Kurt Nilsen, Espen Lind, Askil Holm & Alejandro Fuentes	Hallelujah Live – Volume 2
27	Kurt Nilsen, Espen Lind, Askil Holm & Alejandro Fuentes	Hallelujah Live – Volume 2
28	Kurt Nilsen, Espen Lind, Askil Holm & Alejandro Fuentes	Hallelujah Live – Volume 2
29	Kurt Nilsen, Espen Lind, Askil Holm & Alejandro Fuentes	Hallelujah Live – Volume 2
30	Michael Jackson & Jackson 5	50 The Motown Years
31	Michael Jackson & Jackson 5	50 The Motown Years
32	Michael Jackson & Jackson 5	50 The Motown Years
33	Alan Jackson	Norwegian Favorites
34	Alan Jackson	Norwegian Favorites
35	Alan Jackson	Norwegian Favorites
36	Alan Jackson	Norwegian Favorites
37	John Fogerty	The Blue Ridge Rangers Rides Again
38	Various Artists	Melodi Grand Prix Junior 2009
39	Muse	The Resistance
40	Mark Knopfler	Get Lucky
41	Sivert Høyem	Moon Landing
42	Sivert Høyem	Moon Landing
43	Sivert Høyem	Moon Landing
44	Donkeyboy	Caught in a Life
45	Donkeyboy	Caught in a Life
46	Donkeyboy	Caught in a Life
47	Dum Dum Boys	Tidsmaskin
48	Sissel og Odd	Strålande jul
49	Sissel og Odd	Strålande jul
50	Sissel og Odd	Strålande jul
51	Sissel og Odd	Strålande jul
52	Sissel og Odd	Strålande jul
53	Sissel og Odd	Strålande jul

== 2010 ==
Week	Artist	Album title
1	Donkeyboy	Caught in a Life
2	Stage Dolls	Always
3	Frøya	My American Dream
4	Motorpsycho	Heavy Metal Fruit
5	Rihanna	Rated R
6	The Baseballs	Strike!
7	The Baseballs	Strike!
8	The Baseballs	Strike!
9	The Baseballs	Strike!
10	The Baseballs	Strike!
11	The Baseballs	Strike!
12	Susanne Sundfør	The Brothel
13	Susanne Sundfør	The Brothel
14	Susanne Sundfør	The Brothel
15	Susanne Sundfør	The Brothel
16	Gitarkameratene	Kanon! Gitarkameratenes aller beste
17	Thomas Dybdahl	Waiting for That One Clear Moment
18	AC/DC	Iron Man 2 Soundtrack
19	AC/DC	Iron Man 2 Soundtrack
20	Karpe Diem	Aldri solgt en løgn
21	The Rolling Stones	Exile on Main Street
22	Various Artists	Eurovision Song Contest – Oslo 2010
23	Various Artists	Eurovision Song Contest – Oslo 2010
24	Hellbillies	Leite etter lykka
25	Hellbillies	Leite etter lykka
26	Hellbillies	Leite etter lykka
27	Hellbillies	Leite etter lykka
28	Hellbillies	Leite etter lykka
29	Hellbillies	Leite etter lykka
30	Hellbillies	Leite etter lykka
31	Hellbillies	Leite etter lykka
32	Arcade Fire	The Suburbs
33	Hellbillies	Leite etter lykka
34	Iron Maiden	The Final Frontier
35	Iron Maiden	The Final Frontier
36	Iron Maiden	The Final Frontier
37	Various Artists	Melodi Grand Prix Junior 2010
38	Röyksopp	Senior
39	Various Artists	Melodi Grand Prix Junior 2010
39	Odd Nordstoga	November
40	Odd Nordstoga	November
41	Odd Nordstoga	November
42	Henning Kvitnes	For sånne som oss
43	Henning Kvitnes	For sånne som oss
44	Vamp	I Full Symfoni 2
45	Vamp	I Full Symfoni 2
46	Bjørn Eidsvåg	Rundt neste sving
47	Bruce Springsteen	The Promise
48	Kurt Nilsen	Have Yourself a Merry Little Christmas
49	Kurt Nilsen	Have Yourself a Merry Little Christmas
50	Kurt Nilsen	Have Yourself a Merry Little Christmas
51	Kurt Nilsen	Have Yourself a Merry Little Christmas
52	Kurt Nilsen	Have Yourself a Merry Little Christmas

== 2011 ==
Week	Date	Artist	Album title
1	4 January 2011	Rihanna	Loud
2	11 January 2011	The Bellamy Brothers	The Anthology Volume 1
3	18 January 2011	The Bellamy Brothers	The Anthology Volume 1
4	25 January 2011	Sie Gubba	Alt du vil ha
5	4 February 2011	Sie Gubba	Alt du vil ha
6	11 February 2014	Kaizers Orchestra	Violeta, Violeta Vol. 1
7	18 February 2014	John Olav Nilsen & Gjengen	Det nærmeste du kommer
8	25 February 2011	Kaizers Orchestra	Violeta, Violeta Vol. 1
9	4 March 2011	Kaizers Orchestra	Violeta, Violeta Vol. 1
10	11 March 2011	Bigbang	Epic Scrap Metal
11	18 March 2011	Bigbang	Epic Scrap Metal
12	25 March 2011	Bigbang	Epic Scrap Metal
13	1 April 2011	Bigbang	Epic Scrap Metal
14	8 April 2011	Åge Aleksandersen and Sambandet	Furet værbitt
15	15 April 2011	Foo Fighters	Wasting Light
16	22 April 2011	Foo Fighters	Wasting Light
17	29 April 2011	Foo Fighters	Wasting Light
18	6 May 2011	Adele	21
19	13 May 2011	Fleet Foxes	Helplessness Blues
20	20 May 2011	Adele	21
21	27 May 2011	Adele	21
22	3 June 2011	Lady Gaga	Born This Way
23	10 June 2011	Lady Gaga	Born This Way
24	17 June 2011	Adele	21
25	24 June 2011	Adele	21
26	1 July 2011	Bon Iver	Bon Iver
27	8 July 2011	Jarle Bernhoft	Solidarity Breaks
28	15 July 2011	Jarle Bernhoft	Solidarity Breaks
29	22 July 2011	Jarle Bernhoft	Solidarity Breaks
30	29 July 2011	Jarle Bernhoft	Solidarity Breaks
31	5 August 2011	Jarle Bernhoft	Solidarity Breaks
32	12 August 2011	Jarle Bernhoft	Solidarity Breaks
33	19 August 2011	Jay-Z and Kanye West	Watch the Throne
34	26 August 2011	Adele	21
35	2 September 2011	Jarle Bernhoft	Solidarity Breaks
36	9 September 2011	Adele	21
37	16 September 2011	Ane Brun	It All Starts with One
38	23 September 2011	Ane Brun	It All Starts with One
39	30 September 2011	Sivert Høyem	Long Slow Distance
40	7 October 2011	Sivert Høyem	Long Slow Distance
41	14 October 2011	Ane Brun	It All Starts with One
42	21 October 2011	Odd Nordstoga	Bestevenn
43	28 October 2011	Tom Waits	Bad as Me
44	4 November 2011	Coldplay	Mylo Xyloto
45	11 November 2011	Coldplay	Mylo Xyloto
46	18 November 2011	Kaizers Orchestra	Violeta Violeta Vol. II
47	25 November 2011	Kaizers Orchestra	Violeta Violeta Vol. II
48	2 December 2011	Rihanna	Talk That Talk
49	9 December 2011	Michael Bublé	Christmas
50	16 December 2011	Rihanna	Talk That Talk
51	23 December 2011	Jarle Bernhoft	Walk with Me
52	30 December 2011	Jarle Bernhoft	Walk with Me

== 2012 ==
Week	Publ. date	Artist(s)	Album title
1	6 January 2012	Adele	21
2	13 January 2012	Adele	21
3	20 January 2012	Adele	21
4	27 January 2012	Adele	21
5	3 February 2012	Leonard Cohen	Old Ideas
6	10 February 2012	Leonard Cohen	Old Ideas
7	17 February 2012	Leonard Cohen	Old Ideas
8	24 February 2012	Adele	21
9	2 March 2012	Adele	21
10	9 March 2012	Bruce Springsteen	Wrecking Ball
11	16 March 2012	Bruce Springsteen	Wrecking Ball
12	23 March 2012	Diverse artister	Hver gang vi møtes
13	30 March 2012	Diverse artister	Hver gang vi møtes
14	6 April 2012	Susanne Sundfør	The Silicone Veil
15	13 April 2012	Susanne Sundfør	The Silicone Veil
16	20 April 2012	Diverse artister	Hver gang vi møtes
17	27 April 2012	Morten Harket	Out of My Hands
18	4 May 2012	Kent	Jag är inte rädd för mörkret
19	11 May 2012	Kent	Jag är inte rädd för mörkret
20	18 May 2012	Laleh	Sjung
21	25 May 2012	Dum Dum Boys	Ti liv
22	1 June 2012	Dum Dum Boys	Ti liv
23	8 June 2012	Melody Gardot	Absence
24	15 June 2012	Melody Gardot	Absence
25	22 June 2012	Turbonegro	Sexual Harassment
26	29 June 2012	Justin Bieber	Believe
27	6 July 2012	Justin Bieber	Believe
28	13 July 2012	Justin Bieber	Believe
29	20 July 2012	Frank Ocean	channel ORANGE
30	27 July 2012	Lana Del Rey	Born to Die
31	3 August 2012	Lana Del Rey	Born to Die
32	10 August 2012	Lana Del Rey	Born to Die
33	17 August 2012	Lana Del Rey	Born to Die
34	24 August 2012	Lana Del Rey	Born to Die
35	31 August 2012	Oslo Ess	Verden på nakken, venner i ryggen
36	7 September 2012	Mark Knopfler	Privateering
37	14 September 2012	Bob Dylan	Tempest
38	21 September 2012	Bob Dylan	Tempest
39	28 September 2012	Karpe Diem	Kors på halsen, ti kniver i hjertet, mor og far i døden
40	5 October 2012	Karpe Diem	Kors på halsen, ti kniver i hjertet, mor og far i døden
41	12 October 2012	Muse	The 2nd Law
42	19 October 2012	Vinni	Oppvåkningen
43	26 October 2012	Vamp	Liten fuggel
44	2 November 2012	Vamp	Liten fuggel
45	9 November 2012	Kaizers Orchestra	Violeta Violeta Vol III
46	16 November 2012	One Direction	Take Me Home
47	23 November 2012	One Direction	Take Me Home
48	30 November 2012	Rihanna	Unapologetic
49	7 December 2012	Vamp	Liten fuggel
50	14 December 2012	Vamp	Liten fuggel
51	21 December 2012	Vamp	Liten fuggel
52	28 December 2012	Vamp	Liten fuggel

== 2013 ==
Week	Publ. date	Artist(s)	Album title
1	4 January 2013	Vamp	Liten fuggel
2	11 January 2013	Mumford & Sons	Babel
3	18 January 2013	Kurt Nilsen	Inni en god periode
4	25 January 2013	Kurt Nilsen	Inni en god periode
5	1 February 2013	Kurt Nilsen	Inni en god periode
6	8 February 2013	Justin Bieber	Believe Acoustic
7	15 February 2013	Various Artists	Hver gang vi møtes – Sesong 2
8	22 February 2013	Various Artists	Hver gang vi møtes – Sesong 2
9	1 March 2013	Various Artists	Hver gang vi møtes – Sesong 2
10	8 March 2013	Various Artists	Hver gang vi møtes – Sesong 2
11	15 March 2013	Bigbang	The Oslo Bowl
12	22 March 2013	David Bowie	The Next Day
13	29 March 2013	David Bowie	The Next Day
14	5 April 2013	Kvelertak	Meir
15	12 April 2013	Volbeat	Outlaw Gentlemen and Shady Ladies
16	19 April 2013	Staut	Stugureint
17	26 April 2013	Vassendgutane	Hesteslepp
18	3 May 2013	Vassendgutane	Hesteslepp
19	10 May 2013	Deep Purple	Now What?!
20	17 May 2013	Bruce Springsteen	Collection: 1973-2012
21	24 May 2013	Various Artists	Eurovision Song Contest - Malmö 2013
22	31 May 2013	Daft Punk	Random Access Memories
23	7 June 2013	Daft Punk	Random Access Memories
24	14 June 2013	Ole Paus	Avslutningen
25	21 June 2013	Black Sabbath	13
26	28 June 2013	Ole Paus	Avslutningen
27	5 July 2013	Ole Paus	Avslutningen
28	12 July 2013	Ausekarane	Farande fant
29	19 July 2013	Ausekarane	Farande fant
30	26 July 2013	Pet Shop Boys	Electric
31	2 August 2013	Selena Gomez	Stars Dance
32	9 August 2013	Ausekarane	Farande fant
33	16 August 2013	Rune Rudberg	Tro
34	23 August 2013	Madcon	Icon
35	30 August 2013	Vamp	To me alt
36	6 September 2013	Various artists	MGP jr 2013
37	13 September 2013	Various artists	MGP jr 2013
38	20 September 2013	Satyricon	Satyricon
39	27 September 2013	Thomas Dybdahl	What's Left Is Forever
40	4 October 2013	Maria Mena	Weapon in Mind
41	11 October 2013	Melissa Horn	Om du vill vara med mig
42	18 October 2013	Miley Cyrus	Bangerz
43	25 October 2013	Paul McCartney	New
44	1 November 2013	Bjørn Eidsvåg	Far faller
45	8 November 2013	Avicii	True
45	15 November 2013	Eminem	The Marshall Mathers LP 2
47	22 November 2013	Stein Torleif Bjella	Heim for å døy
48	29 November 2013	Avicii	True
49	6 December 2013	One Direction	Midnight Memories
50	13 December 2013	Kurt Nilsen	Have Yourself a Merry Little Christmas
51	20 December 2013	Kurt Nilsen	Have Yourself a Merry Little Christmas
52	27 December 2013	Kurt Nilsen	Have Yourself a Merry Little Christmas

== 2014 ==
Week	Publ. date	Artist(s)	Album title
1	3 January 2014	Kurt Nilsen	Have Yourself a Merry Little Christmas
2	10 January 2014	Avicii	True
3	17 January 2014	Avicii	True
4	24 January 2014	Bruce Springsteen	High Hopes
5	31 January 2014	Bruce Springsteen	High Hopes
6	7 February 2014	Skambankt	Sirene
7	14 February 2014	Highasakite	Silent Treatment
8	21 February 2014	Highasakite	Silent Treatment
9	28 February 2014	Oslo Ess	Alle hjerter deler seg
10	7 March 2014	Jason Derulo	Tattoos
11	14 March 2014	Pharrell Williams	G I R L
12	21 March 2014	Sivert Høyem	Endless Love
13	28 March 2014	Various Artists	Bauta - En hyllest til Bjørn Eidsvåg
14	4 April 2014	Various Artists	Bauta - En hyllest til Bjørn Eidsvåg
15	11 April 2014	Jason Derulo	Tattoos
16	18 April 2014	Morten Harket	Brother
17	25 April 2014	Morten Harket	Brother
18	2 May 2014	Jarle Bernhoft	Islander
19	9 May 2014	Kent	Tigerdrottningen
20	16 May 2014	Kent	Tigerdrottningen
21	23 May 2014	Coldplay	Ghost Stories
22	30 May 2014	Coldplay	Ghost Stories
23	6 June 2014	Jason Derulo	Tattoos
24	13 June 2014	Åge Aleksandersen	Sukker og Salt
25	20 June 2014	First Aid Kit	Stay Gold
26	27 June 2014	Lana Del Rey	Ultraviolence
27	4 July 2014	Ed Sheeran	X
28	11 July 2014	5 Seconds of Summer	5 Seconds of Summer
29	18 July 2014	Ed Sheeran	X
30	25 July 2014	Ed Sheeran	X
31	2 August 2014	Ed Sheeran	X
32	9 August 2014	Ed Sheeran	X
33	16 August 2014	Ed Sheeran	X
34	23 August 2014	Ed Sheeran	X
35	30 August 2014	Ed Sheeran	X
36	6 September 2014	Ariana Grande	My Everything
37	13 September 2014	Various Artists	MGPjr 2014
38	20 September 2014	Various Artists	MGPjr 2014
39	27 September 2014	Various Artists	MGPjr 2014
40	4 October 2014	Leonard Cohen	Popular Problems
41	11 October 2014	Emilie Nicolas	Like I'm a Warrior
42	18 October 2014	Nico & Vinz	Black Star Elephant
43	25 October 2014	deLillos	Rett og slett livet
44	1 November 2014	Marit Larsen	When the Morning Comes
45	8 November 2014	Taylor Swift	1989
46	15 November 2014	Pink Floyd	The Endless River
47	22 November 2014	Pink Floyd	The Endless River
48	29 November 2014	One Direction	Four
49	6 December 2014	Pink Floyd	The Endless River
50	13 December 2014	AC/DC	Rock or Bust
51	20 December 2014	Kurt Nilsen	Have Yourself a Merry Little Christmas
52	27 December 2014	Kurt Nilsen	Have Yourself a Merry Little Christmas

== 2015 ==
Week	Publ. date	Artist(s)	Album title
1	3 January 2015	Kurt Nilsen	Have Yourself a Merry Little Christmas
2	10 January 2015	Ed Sheeran	X
3	17 January 2015	Ed Sheeran	X
4	24 January 2015	Ed Sheeran	X
5	31 January 2015	Ed Sheeran	X
6	7 February 2015	Ed Sheeran	X
7	14 February 2015	Bob Dylan	Shadows in the Night
8	21 February 2015	Thåström	Den morronen
9	28 February 2015	Susanne Sundfør	Ten Love Songs
10	7 March 2015	Susanne Sundfør	Ten Love Songs
11	14 March 2015	Morten Abel	I fullt alvor
12	21 March 2015	Susanne Sundfør	Ten Love Songs
13	28 March 2015	Mark Knopfler	Tracker
14	4 March 2015	Mark Knopfler	Tracker
15	11 March 2015	Mark Knopfler	Tracker
16	18 April 2015	Ed Sheeran	X
17	25 April 2015	Seigmen	Enola
18	2 May 2015	Shawn Mendes	Handwritten
19	9 May 2015	Shawn Mendes	Handwritten
20	16 May 2015	Mumford & Sons	Wilder Mind
21	23 May 2015	Mari & Hakon Samuelsen	James Horner: Pas de deux
22	30 May 2015	Vassendgutane	Skru opp!!
23	6 June 2015	Flo Rida	My House
24	13 June 2015	Flo Rida	My House
25	20 June 2015	Muse	Drones
26	27 June 2015	Jason Derulo	Everything Is 4
27	4 July 2015	Jason Derulo	Everything Is 4
28	11 July 2015	Jason Derulo	Everything Is 4
29	18 July 2015	Jason Derulo	Everything Is 4
30	25 July 2015	Jason Derulo	Everything Is 4
31	1 August 2015	Jason Derulo	Everything Is 4
32	8 August 2015	Jason Derulo	Everything Is 4
33	15 August 2015	Jason Derulo	Everything Is 4
34	22 August 2015	Jason Derulo	Everything Is 4
35	29 August 2015	Jason Derulo	Everything Is 4
36	5 September 2015	The Weeknd	Beauty Behind the Madness
37	12 September 2015	Iron Maiden	The Book of Souls
38	19 September 2015	The Weeknd	Beauty Behind the Madness
39	26 September 2015	David Gilmour	Rattle That Lock
40	3 October 2015	David Gilmour	Rattle That Lock
41	10 October 2015	Avicii	Stories
42	17 October 2015	Odd Nordstoga	Dette landet
43	24 October 2015	Vamp	Populas
44	31 October 2015	5 Seconds of Summer	Sounds Good Feels Good
45	7 November 2015	The Weeknd	Beauty Behind the Madness
46	14 November 2015	Marcus & Martinus	Hei
47	21 November 2015	Justin Bieber	Purpose
48	28 November 2015	Adele	25
49	5 December 2015	Adele	25
50	12 December 2015	Coldplay	A Head Full of Dreams
51	19 December 2015	Adele	25
52	26 December 2015	Adele	25

== 2016 ==
Week	Publ. date	Artist(s)	Album title
53 (of 2015)	2 January 2016	Adele	25
1	9 January 2016	Adele	25
2	16 January 2016	Justin Bieber	Purpose
3	23 January 2016	David Bowie	Blackstar
4	30 January 2016	David Bowie	Blackstar
5	6 February 2016	Sivert Høyem	Lioness
6	13 February 2016	Rihanna	Anti
7	20 February 2016	Rihanna	Anti
8	27 February 2016	Rihanna	Anti
9	5 March 2016	Rihanna	Anti
10	12 March 2016	Sia	This Is Acting
11	19 March 2016	Aurora	All My Demons Greeting Me as a Friend
12	26 March 2016	Aurora	All My Demons Greeting Me as a Friend
13	2 April 2016	Zayn	Mind of Mine
14	9 April 2016	Kanye West	The Life of Pablo
15	16 April 2016	Kanye West	The Life of Pablo
16	22 April 2016	Kanye West	The Life of Pablo
17	29 April 2016	Beyoncé	Lemonade
18	6 May 2016	Adele	25
19	13 May 2016	Radiohead	A Moon Shaped Pool
20	20 May 2016	Kygo	Cloud Nine
21	27 May 2016	Highasakite	Camp Echo
22	3 June 2016	Drake	Views
23	10 June 2016	Drake	Views
24	17 June 2016	Drake	Views
25	24 June 2016	Drake	Views
26	1 July 2016	Drake	Views
27	8 July 2016	Drake	Views
28	15 July 2016	Drake	Views
29	22 July 2016	Drake	Views
30	29 July 2016	Drake	Views
31	5 August 2016	Drake	Views
32	12 August 2016	Drake	Views
33	19 August 2016	Drake	Views
34	26 August 2016	Frank Ocean	Blonde
35	2 September 2016	Frank Ocean	Blonde
36	9 September 2016	Drake	Views
37	16 September 2016	Nick Cave and the Bad Seeds	Skeleton Tree
38	23 September 2016	Ariana Grande	Dangerous Woman
39	30 September 2016	Shawn Mendes	Illuminate
40	7 October 2016	Shawn Mendes	Illuminate
41	14 October 2016	Shawn Mendes	Illuminate
42	21 October 2016	Hellbillies	Søvnlaus
43	28 October 2016	Leonard Cohen	You Want It Darker
44	4 November 2016	Sia	This Is Acting
45	11 November 2016	Marcus & Martinus	Together
46	18 November 2016	Leonard Cohen	You Want It Darker
47	25 November 2016	Metallica	Hardwired... to Self-Destruct
48	2 December 2016	The Weeknd	Starboy
49	9 December 2016	The Rolling Stones	Blue & Lonesome
50	16 December 2016	The Weeknd	Starboy
51	23 December 2016	Kurt Nilsen	Have Yourself a Merry Little Christmas
52	30 December 2016	Kurt Nilsen	Have Yourself a Merry Little Christmas

== 2017 ==
Week	Publ. date	Artist(s)	Album title
1	6 January 2017	The Weeknd	Starboy
2	13 January 2017	The Weeknd	Starboy
3	20 January 2017	Sia	This Is Acting
4	27 January 2017	The Weeknd	Starboy
5	3 February 2017	The Weeknd	Starboy
6	10 February 2017	The Weeknd	Starboy
7	17 February 2017	The Weeknd	Starboy
8	24 February 2017	Various artists	Fifty Shades Darker: Original Motion Picture Soundtrack
9	3 March 2017	Various artists	Fifty Shades Darker: Original Motion Picture Soundtrack
10	10 March 2017	Ed Sheeran	÷
11	17 March 2017	Ed Sheeran	÷
12	24 March 2017	Ed Sheeran	÷
13	31 March 2017	Ed Sheeran	÷
14	7 April 2017	Ed Sheeran	÷
15	14 April 2017	Ed Sheeran	÷
16	21 April 2017	Ed Sheeran	÷
17	28 April 2017	Ed Sheeran	÷
18	5 May 2017	Ed Sheeran	÷
19	12 May 2017	Ed Sheeran	÷
20	19 May 2017	Ed Sheeran	÷
21	26 May 2017	Ed Sheeran	÷
22	2 June 2017	Ed Sheeran	÷
23	9 June 2017	Roger Waters	Is This the Life We Really Want?
24	16 June 2017	Ed Sheeran	÷
25	23 June 2017	Ed Sheeran	÷
26	30 June 2017	Imagine Dragons	Evolve
27	7 July 2017	Imagine Dragons	Evolve
28	14 July 2017	Imagine Dragons	Evolve
29	21 July 2017	Imagine Dragons	Evolve
30	28 July 2017	Lana Del Rey	Lust for Life
31	4 August 2017	DJ Khaled	Grateful
32	11 August 2017	DJ Khaled	Grateful
33	18 August 2017	DJ Khaled	Grateful
34	25 August 2017	Ed Sheeran	÷
35	1 September 2017	XXXTentacion	17
36	8 September 2017	XXXTentacion	17
37	15 September 2017	Susanne Sundfør	Music for People in Trouble
38	22 September 2017	Foo Fighters	Concrete and Gold
39	29 September 2017	XXXTentacion	17
40	6 October 2017	Ed Sheeran	÷
41	13 October 2017	Cezinando	Noen ganger og andre
42	20 October 2017	Cezinando	Noen ganger og andre
43	27 October 2017	Cezinando	Noen ganger og andre
44	3 November 2017	Cezinando	Noen ganger og andre
45	10 November 2017	Sam Smith	The Thrill of It All
46	17 November 2017	Taylor Swift	Reputation
47	24 November 2017	Cezinando	Noen ganger og andre
48	1 December 2017	Marcus & Martinus	Moments
49	8 December 2017	Kurt Nilsen	Have Yourself a Merry Little Christmas
50	15 December 2017	Kurt Nilsen	Have Yourself a Merry Little Christmas
51	22 December 2017	Eminem	Revival
52	29 December 2017	Kurt Nilsen	Have Yourself a Merry Little Christmas

== 2018 ==
Week	Publ. date	Artist(s)	Album title
1	5 January 2018	Eminem	Revival
2	12 January 2018	Ed Sheeran	÷
3	19 January 2018	Camila Cabello	Camila
4	26 January 2018	Camila Cabello	Camila
5	2 February 2018	Camila Cabello	Camila
6	9 February 2018	Camila Cabello	Camila
7	16 February 2018	Kendrick Lamar and various artists	Black Panther: The Album
8	23 February 2018	Various artists	Fifty Shades Freed (Original Motion Picture Soundtrack)
9	2 March 2018	Camila Cabello	Camila
10	9 March 2018	Camila Cabello	Camila
11	16 March 2018	Various artists	Fifty Shades Freed (Original Motion Picture Soundtrack)
12	23 March 2018	XXXTentacion	?
13	30 March 2018	XXXTentacion	?
14	6 April 2018	The Weeknd	My Dear Melancholy,
15	13 April 2018	The Weeknd	My Dear Melancholy,
16	20 April 2018	The Weeknd	My Dear Melancholy,
17	27 April 2018	Avicii	True
18	4 May 2018	Post Malone	Beerbongs & Bentleys
19	11 May 2018	Post Malone	Beerbongs & Bentleys
20	18 May 2018	Post Malone	Beerbongs & Bentleys
21	25 May 2018	Post Malone	Beerbongs & Bentleys
22	1 June 2018	Post Malone	Beerbongs & Bentleys
23	8 June 2018	Ghost	Prequelle
24	15 June 2018	Post Malone	Beerbongs & Bentleys
25	22 June 2018	Post Malone	Beerbongs & Bentleys
26	29 June 2018	XXXTentacion	?
27	6 July 2018	Drake	Scorpion
28	13 July 2018	Drake	Scorpion
29	20 July 2018	Drake	Scorpion
30	27 July 2018	Drake	Scorpion
31	3 August 2018	Drake	Scorpion
32	10 August 2018	Travis Scott	Astroworld
33	17 August 2018	Travis Scott	Astroworld
34	24 August 2018	Ariana Grande	Sweetener
35	31 August 2018	Ariana Grande	Sweetener
36	7 September 2018	Eminem	Kamikaze
37	14 September 2018	Eminem	Kamikaze
38	21 September 2018	Eminem	Kamikaze
39	28 September 2018	Eminem	Kamikaze
40	5 October 2018	Eminem	Kamikaze
41	12 October 2018	Eminem	Kamikaze
42	19 October 2018	Eminem	Kamikaze
43	26 October 2018	DumDum Boys	Armer og bein
44	2 November 2018	Lady Gaga and Bradley Cooper	A Star Is Born
45	9 November 2018	Lady Gaga and Bradley Cooper	A Star Is Born
46	16 November 2018	Lady Gaga and Bradley Cooper	A Star Is Born
47	23 November 2018	Mark Knopfler	Down the Road Wherever
48	30 November 2018	Lady Gaga and Bradley Cooper	A Star Is Born
49	7 December 2018	Unge Ferrari	Midt imellom magisk og manisk
50	14 December 2018	XXXTentacion	Skins
51	21 December 2018	Kurt Nilsen	Have Yourself a Merry Little Christmas
52	28 December 2018	Kurt Nilsen	Have Yourself a Merry Little Christmas

== 2019 ==
Week	Publ. date	Artist(s)	Album title
1	4 January 2019	Alan Walker	Different World
2	11 January 2019	Alan Walker	Different World
3	18 January 2019	Alan Walker	Different World
4	25 January 2019	Alan Walker	Different World
5	1 February 2019	Alan Walker	Different World
6	8 February 2019	Alan Walker	Different World
7	15 February 2019	Ariana Grande	Thank U, Next
8	22 February 2019	Ariana Grande	Thank U, Next
9	1 March 2019	Ariana Grande	Thank U, Next
10	8 March 2019	Ariana Grande	Thank U, Next
11	15 March 2019	Sigrid	Sucker Punch
12	22 March 2018	Lady Gaga and Bradley Cooper	A Star Is Born
13	29 March 2019	Lady Gaga and Bradley Cooper	A Star Is Born
14	5 April 2019	Billie Eilish	When We All Fall Asleep, Where Do We Go?
15	12 April 2019	Billie Eilish	When We All Fall Asleep, Where Do We Go?
16	19 April 2019	Billie Eilish	When We All Fall Asleep, Where Do We Go?
17	26 April 2019	Billie Eilish	When We All Fall Asleep, Where Do We Go?
18	3 May 2019	Billie Eilish	When We All Fall Asleep, Where Do We Go?
19	10 May 2019	Billie Eilish	When We All Fall Asleep, Where Do We Go?
20	17 May 2019	Billie Eilish	When We All Fall Asleep, Where Do We Go?
21	24 May 2019	Rammstein	Rammstein
22	31 May 2019	Billie Eilish	When We All Fall Asleep, Where Do We Go?
23	7 June 2019	Billie Eilish	When We All Fall Asleep, Where Do We Go?
24	14 June 2019	Avicii	Tim
25	21 June 2019	Bruce Springsteen	Western Stars
26	28 June 2019	Billie Eilish	When We All Fall Asleep, Where Do We Go?
27	5 July 2019	Billie Eilish	When We All Fall Asleep, Where Do We Go?
28	12 July 2019	Billie Eilish	When We All Fall Asleep, Where Do We Go?
29	19 July 2019	Ed Sheeran	No.6 Collaborations Project
30	26 July 2019	Ed Sheeran	No.6 Collaborations Project
31	2 August 2019	Ed Sheeran	No.6 Collaborations Project
32	9 August 2019	Ed Sheeran	No.6 Collaborations Project
33	16 August 2019	Ed Sheeran	No.6 Collaborations Project
34	23 August 2019	Ed Sheeran	No.6 Collaborations Project
35	30 August 2019	Taylor Swift	Lover
36	6 September 2019	Tool	Fear Inoculum
37	13 September 2019	Post Malone	Hollywood's Bleeding
38	20 September 2019	Post Malone	Hollywood's Bleeding
39	27 September 2019	Post Malone	Hollywood's Bleeding
40	4 October 2019	Post Malone	Hollywood's Bleeding
41	11 October 2019	Post Malone	Hollywood's Bleeding
42	18 October 2019	Post Malone	Hollywood's Bleeding
43	25 October 2019	Post Malone	Hollywood's Bleeding
44	1 November 2019	Kanye West	Jesus Is King
45	8 November 2019	Post Malone	Hollywood's Bleeding
46	15 November 2019	Post Malone	Hollywood's Bleeding
47	22 November 2019	Post Malone	Hollywood's Bleeding
48	29 November 2019	Coldplay	Everyday Life
49	6 December 2019	Kurt Nilsen	Have Yourself a Merry Little Christmas
50	13 December 2019	Kurt Nilsen	Have Yourself a Merry Little Christmas
51	20 December 2019	Kurt Nilsen	Have Yourself a Merry Little Christmas
52	27 December 2019	Kurt Nilsen	Have Yourself a Merry Little Christmas

== 2020 ==
Week	Publ. date	Artist(s)	Album title
1	3 January 2020	JackBoys and Travis Scott	JackBoys
2	10 January 2020	Billie Eilish	When We All Fall Asleep, Where Do We Go?
3	17 January 2020	Selena Gomez	Rare
4	24 January 2020	Eminem	Music to Be Murdered By
5	31 January 2020	Eminem	Music to Be Murdered By
6	7 February 2020	Ole Paus	Så nær, så nær
7	14 February 2020	Lewis Capaldi	Divinely Uninspired to a Hellish Extent
8	21 February 2020	Kvelertak	Splid
9	28 February 2020	Cezinando	Et godt stup i et grunt vann
10	6 March 2020	Cezinando	Et godt stup i et grunt vann
11	13 March 2020	Cezinando	Et godt stup i et grunt vann
12	20 March 2020	Cezinando	Et godt stup i et grunt vann
13	27 March 2020	The Weeknd	After Hours
14	3 April 2020	The Weeknd	After Hours
15	10 April 2020	The Weeknd	After Hours
16	17 April 2020	The Weeknd	After Hours
17	24 April 2020	The Weeknd	After Hours
18	1 May 2020	The Weeknd	After Hours
19	8 May 2020	The Weeknd	After Hours
20	15 May 2020	The Weeknd	After Hours
21	22 May 2020	The Weeknd	After Hours
22	29 May 2020	The Weeknd	After Hours
23	5 June 2020	Kygo	Golden Hour
24	12 June 2020	Emilie Nicolas	Let Her Breathe
25	19 June 2020	The Weeknd	After Hours
26	26 June 2020	Bob Dylan	Rough and Rowdy Ways
27	3 July 2020	Kygo	Golden Hour
28	10 July 2020	Pop Smoke	Shoot for the Stars, Aim for the Moon
29	17 July 2020	Juice Wrld	Legends Never Die
30	24 July 2020	Juice Wrld	Legends Never Die
31	31 July 2020	Taylor Swift	Folklore
32	7 August 2020	Pop Smoke	Shoot for the Stars, Aim for the Moon
33	14 August 2020	Juice Wrld	Legends Never Die
34	21 August 2020	Pop Smoke	Shoot for the Stars, Aim for the Moon
35	28 August 2020	Pop Smoke	Shoot for the Stars, Aim for the Moon
36	4 September 2020	Pop Smoke	Shoot for the Stars, Aim for the Moon
37	11 September 2020	Pop Smoke	Shoot for the Stars, Aim for the Moon
38	18 September 2020	Pop Smoke	Shoot for the Stars, Aim for the Moon
39	25 September 2020	Pop Smoke	Shoot for the Stars, Aim for the Moon
40	2 October 2020	Pop Smoke	Shoot for the Stars, Aim for the Moon
41	9 October 2020	Pop Smoke	Shoot for the Stars, Aim for the Moon
42	16 October 2020	Pop Smoke	Shoot for the Stars, Aim for the Moon
43	23 October 2020	Pop Smoke	Shoot for the Stars, Aim for the Moon
44	30 October 2020	Bruce Springsteen	Letter to You
45	6 November 2020	Ariana Grande	Positions
46	13 November 2020	Pop Smoke	Shoot for the Stars, Aim for the Moon
47	20 November 2020	AC/DC	Power Up
48	27 November 2020	BTS	Be
49	4 December 2020	Kurt Nilsen and KORK	Have Yourself a Merry Little Christmas
50	11 December 2020	Kurt Nilsen and KORK	Have Yourself a Merry Little Christmas
51	18 December 2020	Kurt Nilsen and KORK	Have Yourself a Merry Little Christmas
52	25 December 2020	Kurt Nilsen and KORK	Have Yourself a Merry Little Christmas
53	1 January 2021	The Kid Laroi	F*ck Love

== 2021 ==
Week	Publ. date	Artist(s)	Album title
1	8 January 2021	The Kid Laroi	F*ck Love
2	15 January 2021	The Kid Laroi	F*ck Love
3	22 January 2021	The Kid Laroi	F*ck Love
4	29 January 2021	The Kid Laroi	F*ck Love
5	5 February 2021	The Kid Laroi	F*ck Love
6	12 February 2021	The Weeknd	After Hours
7	19 February 2021	The Weeknd	After Hours
8	26 February 2021	The Weeknd	After Hours
9	5 March 2021	The Weeknd	After Hours
10	12 March 2021	The Weeknd	After Hours
11	19 March 2021	Stig Brenner and Unge Ferrari	Hvite duer, sort magi
12	26 March 2021	Justin Bieber	Justice
13	2 April 2021	Justin Bieber	Justice
14	9 April 2021	Justin Bieber	Justice
15	16 April 2021	Justin Bieber	Justice
16	23 April 2021	Justin Bieber	Justice
17	30 April 2021	Justin Bieber	Justice
18	7 May 2021	Justin Bieber	Justice
19	14 May 2021	Justin Bieber	Justice
20	21 May 2021	J. Cole	The Off-Season
21	28 May 2021	Olivia Rodrigo	Sour
22	4 June 2021	Olivia Rodrigo	Sour
23	11 June 2021	Olivia Rodrigo	Sour
24	18 June 2021	Olivia Rodrigo	Sour
25	25 June 2021	Olivia Rodrigo	Sour
26	2 July 2021	Olivia Rodrigo	Sour
27	9 July 2021	Olivia Rodrigo	Sour
28	16 July 2021	Olivia Rodrigo	Sour
29	23 July 2021	Olivia Rodrigo	Sour
30	30 July 2021	The Kid Laroi	F*ck Love 3: Over You
31	6 August 2021	Billie Eilish	Happier Than Ever
32	13 August 2021	Billie Eilish	Happier Than Ever
33	20 August 2021	Billie Eilish	Happier Than Ever
34	27 August 2021	Olivia Rodrigo	Sour
35	3 September 2021	Kanye West	Donda
36	10 September 2021	Drake	Certified Lover Boy
37	17 September 2021	Kanye West	Donda
38	24 September 2021	Lil Nas X	Montero
39	1 October 2021	Lil Nas X	Montero
40	8 October 2021	Lil Nas X	Montero
41	15 October 2021	Lil Nas X	Montero
42	22 October 2021	Lil Nas X	Montero
43	29 October 2021	Lil Nas X	Montero
44	5 November 2021	Ed Sheeran	=
45	12 November 2021	ABBA	Voyage
46	19 November 2021	Taylor Swift	Red (Taylor's Version)
47	26 November 2021	Adele	30
48	3 December 2021	Adele	30
49	10 December 2021	Michael Bublé	Christmas
50	17 December 2021	Kurt Nilsen and KORK	Have Yourself a Merry Little Christmas
51	24 December 2021	Michael Bublé	Christmas
52	31 December 2021	Kurt Nilsen and KORK	Have Yourself a Merry Little Christmas

== 2022 ==
Week	Publ. date	Artist(s)	Album title
1	7 January 2022	Adele	30
2	14 January 2022	The Weeknd	Dawn FM
3	21 January 2022	The Weeknd	Dawn FM
4	28 January 2022	Aurora	The Gods We Can Touch
5	4 February 2022	Karpe	Omar Sheriff
6	11 February 2022	Karpe	Omar Sheriff
7	18 February 2022	Karpe	Omar Sheriff
8	25 February 2022	Karpe	Omar Sheriff
9	4 March 2022	Karpe	Omar Sheriff
10	11 March 2022	Karpe	Omar Sheriff
11	18 March 2022	Karpe	Omar Sheriff
12	25 March 2022	Karpe	Omar Sheriff
13	1 April 2022	Karpe	Omar Sheriff
14	8 April 2022	Karpe	Omar Sheriff
15	15 April 2022	Karpe	Omar Sheriff
16	22 April 2022	Karpe	Omar Sheriff
17	29 April 2022	Karpe	Omar Sheriff
18	6 May 2022	Rammstein	Zeit
19	13 May 2022	Sigrid	How to Let Go
20	20 May 2022	Kendrick Lamar	Mr. Morale & the Big Steppers
21	27 May 2022	Harry Styles	Harry's House
22	3 June 2022	Harry Styles	Harry's House
23	10 June 2022	Post Malone	Twelve Carat Toothache
24	17 June 2022	Harry Styles	Harry's House
25	24 June 2022	Undergrunn	Undergrunn
26	1 July 2022	Undergrunn	Undergrunn
27	8 July 2022	Harry Styles	Harry's House
28	15 July 2022	Undergrunn	Undergrunn
29	22 July 2022	Undergrunn	Undergrunn
30	29 July 2022	Undergrunn	Undergrunn
31	5 August 2022	Undergrunn	Undergrunn
32	12 August 2022	Undergrunn	Undergrunn
33	19 August 2022	Karpe	Omar Sheriff
34	26 August 2022	Karpe	Omar Sheriff
35	2 September 2022	Karpe	Omar Sheriff
36	9 September 2022	Karpe	Omar Sheriff
37	16 September 2022	Undergrunn	Undergrunn
38	23 September 2022	Undergrunn	Undergrunn
39	30 September 2022	Marstein	Medici Marstein
40	7 October 2022	Ramón	Så klart det gjør vondt
41	14 October 2022	Ramón	Så klart det gjør vondt
42	21 October 2022	Marstein	Medici Marstein
43	28 October 2022	Taylor Swift	Midnights
44	4 November 2022	Taylor Swift	Midnights
45	11 November 2022	Drake and 21 Savage	Her Loss
46	18 November 2022	Bruce Springsteen	Only the Strong Survive
47	25 November 2022	Taylor Swift	Midnights
48	2 December 2022	Kaizers Orchestra	Greatest Hits
49	9 December 2022	Michael Bublé	Christmas
50	16 December 2022	Michael Bublé	Christmas
51	23 December 2022	Michael Bublé	Christmas
52	30 December 2022	Michael Bublé	Christmas

== 2023 ==
Week	Publ. date	Artist(s)	Album title
1	6 January 2023	SZA	SOS
2	13 January 2023	SZA	SOS
3	20 January 2023	Arif Murakami	Å drukne en fisk
4	27 January 2023	Arif Murakami	Å drukne en fisk
5	3 February 2023	Arif Murakami	Å drukne en fisk
6	10 February 2023	Arif Murakami	Å drukne en fisk
7	17 February 2023	Metro Boomin	Heroes & Villains
8	24 February 2023	Metro Boomin	Heroes & Villains
9	3 March 2023	Metro Boomin	Heroes & Villains
10	10 March 2023	Metro Boomin	Heroes & Villains
11	17 March 2023	Miley Cyrus	Endless Summer Vacation
12	24 March 2023	Miley Cyrus	Endless Summer Vacation
13	31 March 2023	Miley Cyrus	Endless Summer Vacation
14	7 April 2023	Miley Cyrus	Endless Summer Vacation
15	14 April 2023	Miley Cyrus	Endless Summer Vacation
16	21 April 2023	Undergrunn	Egoland
17	28 April 2023	Undergrunn	Egoland
18	5 May 2023	Undergrunn	Egoland
19	12 May 2023	Undergrunn	Egoland
20	19 May 2023	Undergrunn	Egoland
21	26 May 2023	Undergrunn	Egoland
22	2 June 2023	Ballinciaga	Postkort Alicante
23	9 June 2023	Ballinciaga	Postkort Alicante
24	16 June 2023	Undergrunn	Egoland
25	23 June 2023	Undergrunn	Egoland
26	30 June 2023	Undergrunn	Egoland
27	7 July 2023	Undergrunn	Egoland
28	14 July 2023	Undergrunn	Egoland
29	21 July 2023	Undergrunn	Egoland
30	28 July 2023	Undergrunn	Egoland
31	4 August 2023	Travis Scott	Utopia
32	11 August 2023	Travis Scott	Utopia
33	18 August 2023	Travis Scott	Utopia
34	25 August 2023	Travis Scott	Utopia
35	1 September 2023	Undergrunn	Egoland
36	8 September 2023	Undergrunn	Egoland
37	15 September 2023	Olivia Rodrigo	Guts
38	22 September 2023	Olivia Rodrigo	Guts
39	29 September 2023	Olivia Rodrigo	Guts
40	6 October 2023	Undergrunn	Egoland
41	13 October 2023	Drake	For All the Dogs
42	20 October 2023	Drake	For All the Dogs
43	27 October 2023	The Rolling Stones	Hackney Diamonds
44	3 November 2023	Taylor Swift	1989 (Taylor's Version)
45	10 November 2023	Taylor Swift	1989 (Taylor's Version)
46	17 November 2023	Undergrunn	Egoland
47	24 November 2023	Undergrunn	Egoland
48	1 December 2023	Undergrunn	Egoland
49	8 December 2023	Michael Bublé	Christmas
50	15 December 2023	Michael Bublé	Christmas
51	22 December 2023	Michael Bublé	Christmas
52	29 December 2023	Kurt Nilsen and KORK	Have Yourself a Merry Little Christmas

== 2024 ==
Week	Publ. date	Artist(s)	Album title
1	5 January 2024	Undergrunn	Egoland
2	12 January 2024	Undergrunn	Egoland
3	19 January 2024	21 Savage	American Dream
4	26 January 2024	Taylor Swift	1989 (Taylor's Version)
5	2 February 2024	DJ MøMø	DJ MøMø Presenterer: Bukkene Bruse på badeland
6	9 February 2024	DJ MøMø	DJ MøMø Presenterer: Bukkene Bruse på badeland
7	16 February 2024	Kanye West and Ty Dolla Sign	Vultures 1
8	23 February 2024	Kanye West and Ty Dolla Sign	Vultures 1
9	1 March 2024	Kanye West and Ty Dolla Sign	Vultures 1
10	8 March 2024	Kanye West and Ty Dolla Sign	Vultures 1
11	15 March 2024	Ariana Grande	Eternal Sunshine
12	22 March 2024	Ariana Grande	Eternal Sunshine
13	29 March 2024	Future and Metro Boomin	We Don't Trust You
14	5 April 2024	Beyoncé	Cowboy Carter
15	12 April 2024	Benson Boone	Fireworks & Rollerblades
16	19 April 2024	Benson Boone	Fireworks & Rollerblades
17	26 April 2024	Taylor Swift	The Tortured Poets Department: The Anthology
18	3 May 2024	Taylor Swift	The Tortured Poets Department: The Anthology
19	10 May 2024	Taylor Swift	The Tortured Poets Department: The Anthology
20	17 May 2024	Taylor Swift	The Tortured Poets Department: The Anthology
21	24 May 2024	Billie Eilish	Hit Me Hard and Soft
22	31 May 2024	Billie Eilish	Hit Me Hard and Soft
23	7 June 2024	Billie Eilish	Hit Me Hard and Soft
24	14 June 2024	Billie Eilish	Hit Me Hard and Soft
25	21 June 2024	Billie Eilish	Hit Me Hard and Soft
26	28 June 2024	Kygo	Kygo
27	5 July 2024	Billie Eilish	Hit Me Hard and Soft
28	12 July 2024	Billie Eilish	Hit Me Hard and Soft
29	19 July 2024	Eminem	The Death of Slim Shady (Coup de Grâce)
30	26 July 2024	Eminem	The Death of Slim Shady (Coup de Grâce)
31	2 August 2024	Billie Eilish	Hit Me Hard and Soft
32	9 August 2024	Billie Eilish	Hit Me Hard and Soft
33	16 August 2024	Billie Eilish	Hit Me Hard and Soft
34	23 August 2024	Post Malone	F-1 Trillion
35	30 August 2024	Sabrina Carpenter	Short n' Sweet
36	6 September 2024	Sabrina Carpenter	Short n' Sweet
37	13 September 2024	Sabrina Carpenter	Short n' Sweet
38	20 September 2024	Sabrina Carpenter	Short n' Sweet
39	27 September 2024	Sabrina Carpenter	Short n' Sweet
40	4 October 2024	Sabrina Carpenter	Short n' Sweet
41	11 October 2024	Coldplay	Moon Music
42	18 October 2024	Sabrina Carpenter	Short n' Sweet
43	25 October 2024	Sabrina Carpenter	Short n' Sweet
44	1 November 2024	Marstein	Frihet i lenker
45	8 November 2024	Marstein	Frihet i lenker
46	15 November 2024	Marstein	Frihet i lenker
47	22 November 2024	Marstein	Frihet i lenker
48	29 November 2024	Kendrick Lamar	GNX
49	6 December 2024	Michael Bublé	Christmas
50	13 December 2024	Michael Bublé	Christmas
51	20 December 2024	Michael Bublé	Christmas
52	27 December 2024	Michael Bublé	Christmas

== 2025 ==
Week	Publ. date	Artist(s)	Album title
1	3 January 2025	Sabrina Carpenter	Short n' Sweet
2	10 January 2025	Sabrina Carpenter	Short n' Sweet
3	17 January 2025	Marstein	Frihet i lenker
4	24 January 2025	Marstein	Frihet i lenker
5	31 January 2025	Central Cee	Can't Rush Greatness
6	7 February 2025	The Weeknd	Hurry Up Tomorrow
7	14 February 2025	The Weeknd	Hurry Up Tomorrow
8	21 February 2025	Sabrina Carpenter	Short n' Sweet
9	28 February 2025	Tate McRae	So Close to What
10	7 March 2025	Tate McRae	So Close to What
11	14 March 2025	Lady Gaga	Mayhem
12	21 March 2025	Playboi Carti	Music
13	28 March 2025	Sabrina Carpenter	Short n' Sweet
14	4 April 2025	Sabrina Carpenter	Short n' Sweet
15	11 April 2025	Sabrina Carpenter	Short n' Sweet
16	18 April 2025	Sabrina Carpenter	Short n' Sweet
17	25 April 2025	Alex Warren	You'll Be Alright, Kid (Chapter 1)
18	2 May 2025	Billie Eilish	Hit Me Hard and Soft
19	9 May 2025	Undergrunn	Memoarer
20	16 May 2025	Tobias Sten	Tobias Sten
21	23 May 2025	Morgan Wallen	I'm the Problem
22	30 May 2025	Tobias Sten	Tobias Sten
23	6 June 2025	Ari Bajgora	Valget å gå, og vi gikk
24	13 June 2025	Ari Bajgora	Valget å gå, og vi gikk
25	20 June 2025	Ari Bajgora	Valget å gå, og vi gikk
26	27 June 2025	Ari Bajgora	Valget å gå, og vi gikk
27	4 July 2025	Ari Bajgora	Valget å gå, og vi gikk
28	11 July 2025	Ari Bajgora	Valget å gå, og vi gikk
29	18 July 2025	Justin Bieber	Swag
30	25 July 2025	Alex Warren	You'll Be Alright, Kid
31	1 August 2025	Tobias Sten	Tobias Sten
32	8 August 2025	Various artists	KPop Demon Hunters (Soundtrack from the Netflix Film)
33	15 August 2025	Various artists	KPop Demon Hunters (Soundtrack from the Netflix Film)
34	22 August 2025	Tobias Sten	Tobias Sten
35	29 August 2025	Tobias Sten	Tobias Sten
36	5 September 2025	Tobias Sten	Tobias Sten
37	12 September 2025	Tobias Sten	Tobias Sten
38	19 September 2025	Tobias Sten	Tobias Sten
39	26 September 2025	Tobias Sten	Tobias Sten
40	3 October 2025	Tobias Sten	Tobias Sten
41	10 October 2025	Taylor Swift	The Life of a Showgirl
42	17 October 2025	Taylor Swift	The Life of a Showgirl
43	24 October 2025	Taylor Swift	The Life of a Showgirl
44	31 October 2025	Taylor Swift	The Life of a Showgirl
45	7 November 2025	Ari Bajgora	Valget å gå, og vi gikk
46	14 November 2025	Ari Bajgora	Valget å gå, og vi gikk
47	21 November 2025	Ari Bajgora	Valget å gå, og vi gikk
48	28 November 2025	Ari Bajgora	Valget å gå, og vi gikk
49	5 December 2025	Kurt Nilsen and KORK	Have Yourself a Merry Little Christmas
50	12 December 2025	Kurt Nilsen and KORK	Have Yourself a Merry Little Christmas
51	19 December 2025	Kurt Nilsen and KORK	Have Yourself a Merry Little Christmas
52	26 December 2025	Kurt Nilsen and KORK	Have Yourself a Merry Little Christmas

== 2026 ==
Week	Publ. date	Artist(s)	Album title
1	2 January 2026	Tobias Sten	Tobias Sten
2	9 January 2026	Tobias Sten	Tobias Sten
3	16 January 2026	Tobias Sten	Tobias Sten
4	23 January 2026	Tobias Sten	Tobias Sten
5	30 January 2026	Tobias Sten	Tobias Sten
6	6 February 2026	Tobias Sten	Tobias Sten
7	13 February 2026	Tobias Sten	Tobias Sten
8	20 February 2026	Tobias Sten	Tobias Sten
9	27 February 2026	Tobias Sten	Tobias Sten
10	6 March 2026	Tobias Sten	Tobias Sten
11	13 March 2026	Harry Styles	Kiss All the Time. Disco, Occasionally.
12	20 March 2026	Harry Styles	Kiss All the Time. Disco, Occasionally.
13	27 March 2026	BTS	Arirang
14	3 April 2026	Tobias Sten	Tobias Sten
15	10 April 2026	Tobias Sten	Tobias Sten
16	17 April 2026	Tobias Sten	Tobias Sten
17	24 April 2026	Tobias Sten	Tobias Sten
18	1 May 2026	Streetboys	Fri
19	8 May 2026	Streetboys	Fri
20	15 May 2026	Delara	Sjelen
21	22 May 2026	Tobias Sten	Heimakjær
22	29 May 2026	Tobias Sten	Heimakjær
23	5 June 2026	Tobias Sten	Heimakjær
24	12 June 2026	Tobias Sten	Heimakjær
25	19 June 2026	Tobias Sten	Heimakjær
26	26 June 2026	Tobias Sten	Heimakjær
27	3 July 2026	Tobias Sten	Heimakjær
28	10 July 2026	Tobias Sten	Heimakjær
29	17 July 2026	The Rolling Stones	Foreign Tongues
30	24 July 2026	Tobias Sten	Heimakjær
31	31 July 2026	Tobias Sten	Heimakjær
32	7 August 2026	Ariana Grande	Petal
33	14 August 2026	Tobias Sten	Heimakjær
34	21 August 2026	Tobias Sten	Heimakjær
35	28 August 2026	Tobias Sten	Heimakjær
36	4 September 2026	Tobias Sten	Heimakjær
37	11 September 2026	Roc Boyz	Roc on Top
38	18 September 2026	Tobias Sten	Heimakjær
39	25 September 2026	Tobias Sten	Heimakjær
40	2 October 2026	Taylor Swift	The Life of a Showgirl
41	9 October 2026	Tobias Sten	Heimakjær
42	16 October 2026	Sienna Spiro	Visitor
43	23 October 2026	Sienna Spiro	Visitor
44	30 October 2026	Marstein	Yap
45	6 November 2026	Marstein	Yap
46	13 November 2026	Marstein	Yap
47	20 November 2026	Marstein	Yap

== See also ==
- List of number-one songs in Norway
