= Hellbillies discography =

- Studio albums: 12
- Live albums: 4
- Compilation albums: 1
- Video albums: 3

This is the discography of the Norwegian rock/country group Hellbillies.

The band started out in early 1990s and has sold over 600,000 records in Norway. To date, they have released 11 studio albums, three live albums and one compilation album.

== Albums ==
=== Studio albums ===
Sylvspente Boots

- Released: August 27, 1992
- Label: Spinner Records
- Sales: 50,000+
- Certification: Platinum (NOR)

Pela Stein

- Released: September 6, 1993
- Label: Spinner Records
- Chart position: 13 (NOR)
- Sales: 62,000+
- Certification: 2× Platinum (NOR)

Lakafant

- Released: April 3, 1995
- Label: BMG Norway
- Chart position: 2 (NOR)
- Sales: 77,000
- Certification: 2× Platinum (NOR)

Drag

- Released: November, 1996
- Label: BMG Norway
- Chart position: 2 (NOR)
- Sales: 50,000+
- Certification: Platinum (NOR)

Sol Over Livet

- Released: April 19, 1999
- Label: BMG Norway
- Chart position: 7 (NOR)
- Sales: 35,000+
- Certification: Platinum (NOR)

Urban Twang

- Released: January 26, 2001
- Label: Warner Music Norway
- Chart position: 2 (NOR)

Niende

- Released: March 29, 2004
- Label: Warner Music Norway
- Chart position: 2 (NOR)
- Sales: 40,000+
- Certification: Platinum (NOR)

Spissrotgang

- Released: October 15, 2007
- Label: EMI Norway
- Chart position: 1 (NOR)
- Sales: 35,000+
- Certification: Platinum (NOR)

Leite Etter Lykka

- Released: June 7, 2010
- Label: EMI Norway
- Chart position: 1

Tretten

- Released: December 7, 2012
- Label: EMI Norway
- Chart position: 2

Søvnlaus

- Released: October 14, 2016
- Label: Hellbillies/Universal Music
- Chart position: 1 (NOR)

Blå dag

- Released: September 10, 2021
- Label: Hellbillies/Universal Music
- Chart position: 10 (NOR)

=== Compilations ===
Røta: Hellbillies Beste

- Released: June 26, 2006
- Label: Warner Music Norway
- Chart position: 3 (NOR)

=== Live albums ===
LIVe LAGA

- Released: October 13, 1997
- Label: BMG Norway
- Chart position: 3 (NOR)
- Sales: 65,000
- Certification: 2× Platinum

CoolTur

- Released: September 9, 2002
- Label: Warner Music Norway
- Chart position: 2 (NOR)

Levande Live

- Released: 2014
- Chart position: 4 (NOR)

30 år på vegen- live 20-21

- Released: TBA summer 2024
- Label: Hellbillies Records

=== Video albums ===
Live Fra Rockefeller

- Released: June 26, 2006
- Format: DVD
- Label: Warner Music Norway

Live Fra Sentrum Scene, 27.-28. November 2010

- Released: November 5, 2012
- Format: DVD (from the limited edition of "Tretten")

Live Fra Rockefeller, 29. November 2013

- Released: June 6, 2014
- Format: DVD
- Label: Hellbillies Records / ESS Engros AS
