= Teddy Nelson =

Musical artist (1939–1992)

- Born: Terje Nielsen; 23 August 1939; Bergen, Norway
- Died: 8 June 1992 (aged 52) Ålborg, Denmark
- Genres: Country
- Occupations: Singer-songwriter, musician
- Instruments: Vocals, guitar
- Years active: 1955–1992

Teddy Nelson (born Terje Nielsen, 23 August 1939 - 8 June 1992) was a Norwegian country music artist, best known for his hit singles "Diggy Liggy Lo", "Bonde ifrå Hamlagrø" and "Skilsmisseferd i Hardanger", and his collaborations with American country music singer Skeeter Davis.

== Biography ==
=== Early years ===
Nelson was born Terje Nielsen in Bergen on 23 August 1939. His parents were from Fana outside Bergen, and he descended from Danish immigrants on his father's side. Nelson grew up in Totlandsvegen, a few minutes east of Nesttun in Fana, as a typical middle-class boy in post-war Norway. He started playing the guitar at early age, and formed his first band when he was 16 years old, in 1955, playing local clubs and gatherings. In 1964, aged 25, Nelson was signed to Columbia EMI, and recorded his first single, "Oh, Susie Be Mine" with his band the Apaches. Ten more singles followed until 1974, whilst Nelson continued playing local venues and gigs in most of Western Norway. He quickly made his mark in the Norwegian country music scene as the first artist to bring humour into the otherwise dark and dim lyrics and songs, and for his nasal vocal performance, and became a popular attraction for country music venues and festivals.

In 1975, he was selected by Johannes Kleppevik (who at the time was known as a songwriter rather than a performer of his own) as one of three local singers (alongside Davy Dean and Clive Scott) to perform on his album A Little Bit of Heaven, where the three singers performed songs written by Kleppevik, with four songs each on the 12-track record.

=== First albums ===
In 1974, Nelson entered the studio in Bergen to record what was originally planned to be a new set of singles. Backing him up was Flying Norwegians, the newly formed country rock group who would later become famous in their own right. During the two weeks of recording, four songs were put on tape, with the intention of making two seven-inch singles. Guitarist Cato Sanden, however, suggested that Nelson save the songs for an album instead of making more singles, which Nelson agreed to do. Nelson soon after secured a record deal with Triola to release his first long play album. The remainder of the album was recorded over the next two years, with Løvstakken String Band backing Nelson for three songs, and Flying Norwegians returning in early 1976 to help record eight more songs.

The debut album, Diggy Liggy, was released in the fall of 1976 and became an instant hit, reaching #1 on the Norwegian Albums Chart and achieving a silver record, as well as being the best-selling country record of the year. The album contained two of his best-selling and best-known songs, "Diggy Liggy Lo" and "Bonde ifrå Hamlagrø", which both received much airplay. The success prompted Nelson to go on a supporting tour, and he was soon contacted by Triola who wanted a follow-up record. In November 1977, Nelson returned to the studio with Flying Norwegians, and recorded his second album, Jippi tai ooh... in just five days, as most of the songs had already been played live and as such little rehearsal was needed. It was then rush-released in time for the Christmas market, with the record hitting shelves on 10 December 1977. Following the album's release, Nelson opted out of another tour, instead returning to the studio with Flying Norwegians soon after whilst his previous albums were still best sellers. Wanting to broaden his audience, Nelson decided to recorded songs only in English, and in a style more similar to his supporting band, Flying Norwegians', previous albums. The result was Point of Departure, Nelsons first English language record and the only one where Flying Norwegians received first credit alongside Nelson, released on the international label Sonet in favor of Triola in order to reach audiences outside of Norway.

In 1979, Nelson returned to Triola and recorded his eponymous fourth album, his best-selling album and final efforts with Flying Norwegians. The album's lead single, "Oksefestival" reached Top 10 on the Norwegian singles charts, while the album later reached Top 3 and got Nelson his second silver record.

=== Nashville recordings ===
In 1980, after increased attention outside Norway, Nelson travelled to the United States after being invited by Skeeter Davis to perform in Nashville. Here he recorded two albums in one set of sessions, Weaver of Dreams and Nashville in My Heart, which were released the same year. He was soon after invited to perform at the Grand Ole Opry, as the first and only Scandinavian artist to receive this honour. Here he was also named «International Star of the Year» in both 1981 and 1982, and was also given many local country music awards both in Nashville, TN and Denver, CL.

=== Return to Norway ===
Nelson soon returned to Norway, and recorded three more albums the next years; I Lusekofte og Sixpence in 1981, Lookin' For The Good Times in 1983, and Honky Tonk Man in 1985. The latter gave Nelsons his biggest hit single, "Skilsmisseferd i Hardanger", his first Norwegian language song in four years, which reached #1 in 1985 and received massive airplay on Norwegian radio. Following this, he was named "Entertainer of the Year" by Norwegian radio station P2 for three consecutive years in 1985, -86 and -87. In 1986, he then recorded and released his tenth album, the appropriately named "10 Teddy", which failed to trump the success of his previous record and went largely unnoticed.

=== Final albums ===
In 1989, after three years of touring and a long break from recording, Nelson returned to Nashville once again to make his eleventh album. American Dreamer was released soon after, and Nelson was named "Male Singer of the Year" at the Country Music Roundup in London, the highest recognition of country music in Europe, for the album. Commenting on the award, many producers credited Nelson as a leading figure who made way for «the modern Nashville sound».

Following the album's release, Nelson resumed his previous collaboration with Skeeter Davis, and she accompanied him for his tours in the US and Norway. Nelson kept both feet on the ground, however, and preferred to play the local venues and town halls in favor of the larger stadiums and concert venues. In 1990 he returned to the studio once again, recording in sessions both in Norway and the US. The result was Millions of Miles, with the titular song, a duet with Davis, being a top selling single both in Norway and the US that year. The following year, Nelson and Davis recorded together once again, this time making a full album of duets entitled "You Were Made For Me", which was released in early 1991.

=== Illness and death ===
In 1991, Nelson was diagnosed with cancer after feeling ill for a period of time. Despite the exhausting treatments for the illness, Nelson continued touring when he was well enough to perform. On 8 June 1992 Nelson was scheduled to perform in Ålborg, Denmark. When his band members came to get him in the dressing room before the show, they found that he had died peacefully while resting, aged 52. He was buried in Sandefjord, where he lived, on 16 August 1992.

== Legacy ==
Since his death, Nelson has been given tributes by both his son, Rudi Nielsen, who performs with his own band playing his fathers songs. He also performed with his father from 1979 to 1992. Norwegian group Vassendgutane has also done covers of Nelsons songs both on records and live, with two of the members in the band being former band members in Nelsons own touring band.

During their 1995-96 and 2005 reunion tours, Flying Norwegians would often play some of Nelsons early songs, with Cato Sanden assuming vocal duties.

== Personal life ==
Nelson lived most of his life in the outskirts of Bergen, where he grew up, but moved to Sandefjord a few years before his death. Nelson had two children, including a son, Rudi Nelson, who recorded and toured with his father from 1979 to 1992, and afterwards began a solo career performing his father's songs.

== Discography ==
=== Albums ===
- Diggy Liggy (1976)
- Jippi tai ooh … (1977)
- Point of Departure (1978), with the Flying Norwegians
- Teddy Nelson (1979)
- Weaver of Dreams (1980)
- Nashville in My Heart (1980)
- I lusekoft og sixpence (1981)
- Looking for the Good Times (1983)
- Honky Tonk Man (1985)
- 10 Teddy (1986)
- American Dreamer (1989)
- Millions of Miles (1990)
- You Were Made for Me (1991), featuring Skeeter Davis

=== Singles ===
- "Norway Jon" (1964)
- "Gringos gitar/I et Jailhouse i vesten" (1966)
- "Beautiful Brown Eyes/Till We Meet Again" (1966)
- "Låvedans/Veien til suksess" (1978)
- "Oksefestival/I'm Just Getting By" (1979)
