= Lars Håvard Haugen =

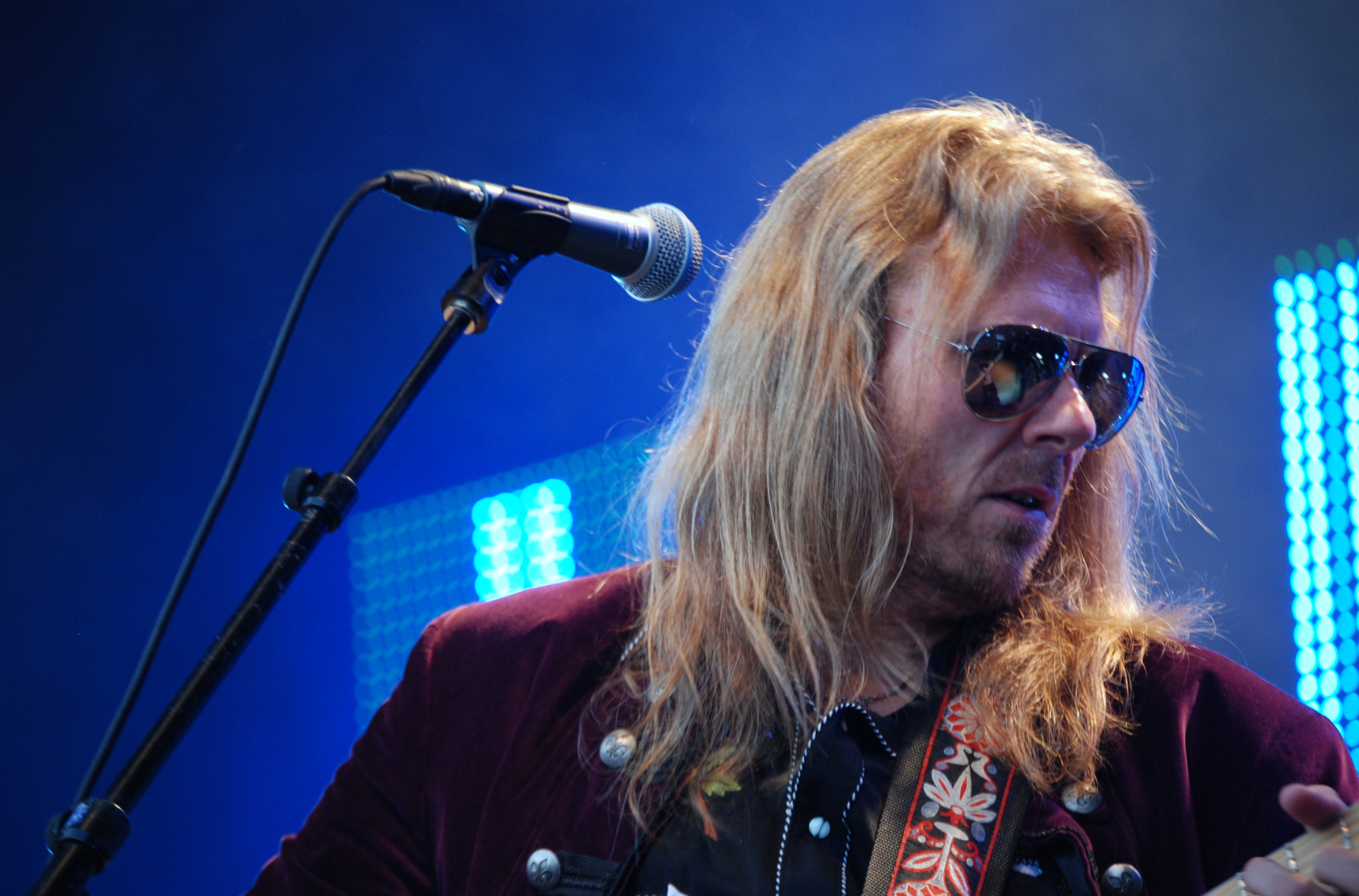
- Haugen with Hellbillies live in Langesund 2011.

Background information
- Born: 29 November 1969 (age 55)
- Origin: Ål i Hallingdal, Norway
- Genres: Country; Progressive rock Blues; Country pop Instrumental music
- Occupation(s): Guitarist; Songwriter
- Instrument(s): Vocals; Electric guitar Mandolin; Lap steel guitar
- Years active: 1981–present
- Labels: Universal Music Group
- Website: larshaavardhaugen.no

Lars Håvard Haugen (born 29 November 1969) is a Norwegian guitarist, songwriter and multi-instrumentalist.

== Career ==
Through his virtuous playing, Haugen has gained a status as one of the greatest contemporary guitarists in Norway, and is best known as the lead guitarist in Hellbillies, where he plays alongside his brother and lead singer Aslag Haugen. He has also made a name for himself with the releases of his debut solo album, Six Strings and the Truth, which was well received by critics and guitarists around the world.

Besides playing, he has produced and co-produced music for many notable Norwegian acts including BigBang, Jonas Fjeld, Ole Paus and more.

Haugen has listed such names as Steve Morse and Dixie Dregs, Albert Lee, Brent Mason, Jerry Donahue, Eric Clapton and Stevie Ray Vaughan as his influences.

== Discography ==
=== Solo albums ===
- 2011: Six Strings And The Truth (Capitol Records)

=== Collaborations ===
With Hellbillies

- 1992: Sylvspente Boots (Spinner Records)
- 1993: Pela Stein (Spinner Records)
- 1995: Lakafant (RCA)
- 1996: Drag (RCA)
- 1996: Live Laga (RCA), live album
- 1999: Sol Over Livet (RCA)
- 2001: Urban Twang (WEA)
- 2004: CoolTur (WEA), live album
- 2004: Niende (WEA)
- 2007: Spissrotgang (EMI)
- 2010: Leite etter Lykka (EMI)
- 2012: Tretten (EMI)
- 2014: Levande Live (NorCD), live album
- 2016: Søvnlaus (Hellbillies Records / Universal Music Norway)
- 2020: I eksil på Sundrehall (Hellbillies Records / Universal Music A/S) - EP
- 2021: Blå dag (Hellbillies Records / Universal Music A/S)

With The Respatexans

- 1999: Almost Famous (RCA)
- 2005: Shine On (MW Records Norway)

With HGH (Hagfors/Gebhardt/Haugen)

- 1999: Pignoise (Stickman Records)

With Bigbang

- 2007: (Too) (Much) (Yang) (Grand Sport Records)

With Martin Hagfors

- 2009: Men And Flies (Me Records)
