= Tobias Sten =

Norwegian singer and songwriter (born 2003)

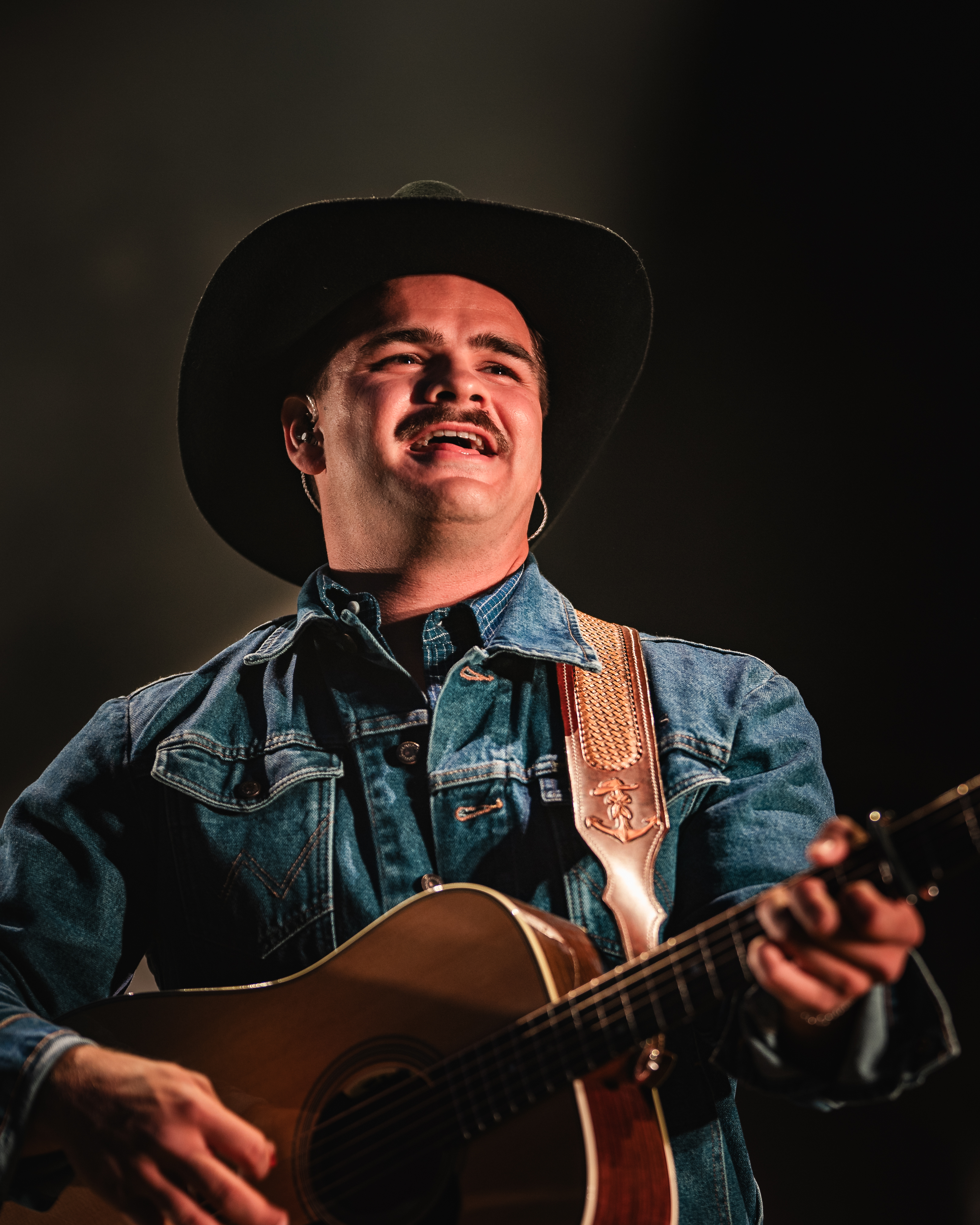
- Tobias Sten on stage in 2026

Background information
- Born: Tobias Johannessen Stenersen; 26 August 2003 (age 23); Stord, Norway
- Genres: Country; pop
- Occupations: Singer; songwriter
- Instrument: Vocals
- Labels: Universal Music Norway; EMI

Tobias Johannessen Stenersen (born 26 August 2003), known professionally as Tobias Sten, is a Norwegian country singer and songwriter. His self-titled debut album was released in May 2025, which reached No. 1 in the Norwegian albums charts and spawned multiple hits, including "Hånd i hånd", which reached No. 1 in the Norwegian singles charts.

== Early life ==
Sten, who has two older sisters, grew up in the municipality of Stord in western Norway. He was exposed to country music at an early age through his father and eventually began learning to play guitar. When he was ten years old, his father left the family. Sten then began writing country songs and formed a country band at the age of twelve. Initially, he also wrote songs in English and in the written language Bokmål, but he later focused on his native dialect.

== Career ==
After starting to perform concerts in his home country, Sten spent a year at the Lillehammer Institute of Music Production and Industries (LIMPI) in Lillehammer. It was during this time that he first came into contact with Universal Music Norway. In 2024, he finally won a country music competition held by a record label, which led to a record deal. He subsequently moved to Oslo and began releasing his first singles.

In October 2024, Sten released his debut EP, Tjue år. In March 2023, he released the song Hvem kan seile foruten vind with Lille Caesar, which reached number three on the Norwegian singles chart. That same month, Sten also entered the top 10 with the song Eli, which later climbed to number five. He released his self-titled debut album, in May 2025, which debuted at number one on the Norwegian album chart. The song Ka visste eg, included on the album, became another top 5 hit for Stenersen. In August 2025, he released Tobias Sten (utvida), an expanded version of the album with three additional tracks. In November 2025, he won the Norwegian P3 Gull music award for "Song of the Year" for his song "Fy faen du e deili." He also won the Newcomer category. Spotify ranked Sten as the second most-streamed artist in Norway in 2025, behind Taylor Swift. He also had two songs, "Fy faen du e deili" and "Eli," in the top 10 most-streamed songs in Norway.

In February 2026, Sten reached number one on the Norwegian singles chart for the first time with the song "Hånd i hånd."

== Musical style and reception ==
Stenersen sings in his Stord dialect. His debut album was described in a review by Norsk rikskringkasting (NRK) as a mixture of "good old-fashioned Nashville country" and "modern and sing-along pop choruses." According to the review, the songs on the album were good, but also very predictable and similar. The album was given three out of six points.

== Discography ==
=== Studio albums ===
List of studio albums, with selected details
Title	Details	Peak chart positions	Certifications
Title	Details	NOR	Certifications
Tobias Sten	Released: 9 May 2025; Label: Universal Music Norway; Formats: Digital download, streaming	1	NOR: Platinum
Heimakjær	Released: 15 May 2026; Label: Universal Music Norway; Formats: Digital download, streaming	1	

=== Extended plays ===
List of extended plays, with selected details
Title	Details	Certifications
Tjue år	Released: 25 October 2024; Label: Universal Music Norway; Formats: Digital download, streaming	NOR: Gold

=== Singles ===
Title	Year	Peak chart positions	Certifications	Album or EP
Title	Year	NOR	Certifications	Album or EP
"Lev, ikkje overlev"	2024	—		Tjue år
"Heim te ståvo"	2024	52	NOR: Gold	Tjue år
"Tjue år"	2024	99		Tjue år
"Eli"	2025	5	NOR: Platinum	Tobias Sten
"Festens klovn"	2025	53	NOR: Gold	Tobias Sten
"Hånd i hånd"	2026	1		Tobias Sten
"Tilgi meg"	2026	6		Non-album singles
"Stokk dum"	2026	19		Non-album singles
"Halvt forhold"	2026	2		Non-album singles
