= Have Yourself a Merry Little Christmas (album) =

Studio album by Kurt Nilsen
- Released: November 15, 2010
- Genre: Christmas music
- Label: Sony BMG

Kurt Nilsen chronology
Hallelujah Live – Volume 2 (2009)	Have Yourself a Merry Little Christmas (2010)

Have Yourself a Merry Little Christmas is a #1 selling bilingual English/Norwegian album by Norwegian singer Kurt Nilsen in participation of Kringkastingsorkestret (KORK), the Norwegian Radio Orchestra conducted by Nick Davies.

The Christmas album was released on 15 November 2010 and hit #1 in 9 different years (2010, 2013, 2014, 2016, 2017, 2018, 2019, 2020 and 2021).

The album contains 13 songs (9 in English and 4 in Norwegian). 11 of the songs are solo and 2 as duets with Christel Alsos and Helene Bøksle.

== Track listing ==
1. "The Christmas Song"
2. "Let It Snow, Let It Snow, Let It Snow"
3. "Baby, It's Cold Outside" (with Christel Alsos)
4. "Himmel på jord"
5. "When You Wish Upon a Star"
6. "Have Yourself a Merry Little Christmas"
7. "Winter Wonderland"
8. "Gje meg handa di venn" (with Helene Bøksle)
9. "Walking in the Air"
10. "Nå tennes tusen julelys" ("Nu tändas tusen juleljus")
11. "Stjernesludd"
12. "White Christmas"
13. "Auld lang syne"

== Charts ==
Chart (2010–2021)	Peak position
Norwegian Albums (VG-lista)	1

== Certifications ==
Region	Certification	Certified units/sales
Norway (IFPI Norway)	9× Platinum	270,000^{‡}
^{‡} Sales+streaming figures based on certification alone.
