= Like I'm a Warrior =

Studio album by Emilie Nicolas
- Released: 19 August 2014
- Genre: Electropop
- Length: 42:03
- Label: Columbia Records / Sony Music Norway

Like I'm a Warrior is the 2014 debut album of the Norwegian singer-songwriter Emilie Nicolas released on Sony Music.

== Background ==
Like I'm a Warrior won Best Pop Singer and Best Newcomer at the 2014 Spellemannprisen. Nicolas headlined the Øya Festival in Oslo 2015, and also appeared at the 2015 Moldejazz international festival.

== Reception ==
Professional ratings
Review scores
Source	Rating
Aftenposten	6/6 stars
Dagbladet	6/6 stars
Verdens Gang	5/6 stars
Romerikes Blad	6/6 stars
Gaffa.com	6/6 stars

Like I'm a Warrior reached number 1 on VG-lista, the official Norwegian Albums Chart. The reviewer Robert Hoftun Gjestad of the Norwegian newspaper Aftenposten awarded the album grade 6, the reviewer Torgrim Øyre of the Norwegian newspaper Dagbladet awarded the album dice 6, the Verdens Gang review awarded the album dice 5, the reviewer Torstein Davidsen of the Norwegian newspaper Romerikes Blad awarded the album dice 6, and the reviewer Brand Barstein of the Scandinavian website Gaffa.com awarded the album 6 stars.

== Track list ==
No.	Title	Length
1.	"Nobody Knows"	4:34
2.	"Let You Out"	3:38
3.	"Grown Up"	3:33
4.	"Melancholia"	5:01
5.	"Fail"	3:26
6.	"Charge"	5:19
7.	"Us"	3:07
8.	"Pstereo"	3:58
9.	"Games"	5:03
10.	"Put Me Down"	4:18

== Charts ==
Chart (2014)	Peak position
Norwegian Albums (VG-lista)	1

=== Certifications ===
Region	Certification	Certified units/sales
Norway (IFPI Norway)	Gold	10,000^{‡}
^{‡} Sales+streaming figures based on certification alone.
