= Flying Norwegians =

Norwegian country rock group

- Origin: Bergen, Norway
- Genres: Rock, country rock
- Years active: 1974–1981; 1994–1997; 2005 (reunion)
- Label: Sonet
- Members: Cato Sanden; Rune Walle; Gunnar Bergstrøm; Jarle Zimmermann; Johannes Torkelsen
- Past members: Egil Skjelnes; Jan Ove Hommel; Ronald Jensen; Bjørn Tore Aasheim; Atle Mjørhaug

Flying Norwegians (occasionally Flyvende Nordmenn) were a Norwegian country rock group formed in 1974, who became highly successful and popular during the 1970s.

== History ==
=== Formation ===
In the late 1960s, guitarist Rune Walle (b. 1951) and drummer Gunnar Bergstrøm (b. 1952) became acquainted. They were both highly sought after musicians in the Bergen music scene, due to their young age and high musical skill level. In 1973, both of them were recruited for the second line-up of popular rock group Saft, with whom they recorded their award-winning album "Stev, sull, rock & roll", which also included violinist and folk musician Sigbjørn Bernhoft Osa. Wanting to create a more country-driven sound, heavily inspired by bands such as the Eagles and the Flying Burrito Brothers, Walle and Bergstrøm left the band to form their own, titled "Flying Norwegians", in January 1974.

To complete the line-up they recruited several other known musicians in the area: Cato Sanden (b. 1954) on guitars, keyboard player Jarle Zimmerman (b. Jarle Fjellanger, 1950) and bass guitarist Johannes Torkelsen (b. 1952). Sanden and Zimmermann shared vocal duties, with Sanden providing the lead vocals on most occasions.

=== New Day and Wounded Bird ===
The band was given a record deal, and entered the studio to record their first album, "New Day". Met with high praise, it sold fairly by Norwegian standards, selling 50,000 copies through 1974 to 1975, and the band was dubbed "The Norwegian Eagles" by several news outlets.

Following a tour to support the album, the band returned to the studio in late 1975 to record their second and best known album, "Wounded Bird", released in 1976, reached No. 12 on the Norwegian album charts.

=== Flyvende Nordmenn ===
Whilst writing and recording their own material in 1975, the band was asked by their fellow musician and friend, Teddy Nelson, to be his supporting band for his debut album, Diggy Liggy. For this the band recruited another friend, steel guitarist Egil Skjelnes, to give the band the needed sound. In order to keep their own studio career as a separate venture, they translated their name to Norwegian; recording under the name "Flyvende Nordmenn". This alternative line-up remained with Nelson for his first four albums (except Walle and Torkelsen, who only appeared on the first album). Three of these were in Norwegian, while the fourth was a venture into English country-rock songs, released under the name "Teddy Nelson and the Flying Norwegians". The album, entitled Point of Departure, is today considered part of both artists main catalogue.

=== Changes and final albums ===
In the spring of 1976 the band resumed touring while not in the studio, a tour which included a brief stint as opening act for the Ozark Mountain Daredevils during their 1976 spring tour of Scandinavia.

A few weeks later, in June 1976, Rune Walle was contacted with the offer to replace Randle Chowning as guitarist in Ozark Mountain Daredevils, following the latter's abrupt departure. Walle had impressed the other members of the band during Flying Norwegians shows as opening act, and they requested that he join them for the US leg of their 1976 tour. He accepted the offer, and played his first show with the group at Arrowhead Stadium in Kansas City on July 23, 1976, on a bill that also included The Beach Boys, The Doobie Brothers, Jeff Beck and Firefall. This did, however, mean that touring and recording was put on halt for Flying Norwegians. On January 10, 1977, four of the five original members reunited for a farewell concert in their hometown of Bergen; a concert which was recorded and released soon after. Bass guitarist Torkelsen had departed when Walle left for the US, and was replaced with Jan Ove Hommel for the show.

Following a one-year break, Sanden reformed the band in 1978, with Egil Skjelnes (steel guitar), Ronald Jensen (bass) and Jan Ove Hommel (guitars) joining Sanden, Zimmerman and Bergstrøm to form a full line-up. This version was however short-lived, recording the album This Time Around to mixed reviews in 1979, and a brief tour.

In 1981, in an attempt to break into mainstream music once again, the band began recording their fourth studio album, Du står i veien (Nor. You're in my way), with new-wave inspired rock songs in Norwegian. This upset Sanden, who was a country- and rock musician at heart, and he left the band just as work began. Skjelnes, Hommel and Jensen all left with him, and studio musicians Bjørn Tore Aasheim (guitars) and Atle Mjørhaug (bass) were recruited to finish the album, with Zimmerman taking over lead vocals. The album was a disaster, met with poor sales and reviews, and the group soon disbanded.

=== Solo careers and later years ===
Sanden, Zimmermann and Walle all had successful solo careers following their time with Flying Norwegians.

Walle, having returned to Norway in 1980, recorded several albums that sold fairly, as did Zimmerman. It was Sanden, however, who had the most success, with his two first albums both winning Album of the Year awards (in 1984 and 86), and the second album, Living Today, also being the most sold record in Norway in 1986.

Torkelsen and Skjelnes returned to work with Teddy Nelson in 1981, and remained in his touring band until Nelsons death in 1992. The other members also appeared sporadically with the group.

In 1994, twenty years after their first album, the original five members reunited, performing a handful of concerts in Norway. At the same time the two albums recorded by the original line-up was re-released on CD, selling to gold. In 1996 they entered the studio for the first time together since 1975 and recorded the band's fifth album, Still Riding. Following a brief set of concerts, they disbanded once again in 1997. Following this the band had occasional reunions and concerts, the last of which took place on April 28, 2005, in Bergen. Five days later, on May 3, Sanden died unexpectedly of a heart attack, aged 51.

Today, most of the members remain active, performing studio work, whilst stating that the death of Sanden "retired the band for good".

== Discography ==
=== Albums ===
- New Day (1974)
- Wounded Bird (1976)
- Live (1977) - recorded on January 10, 1977, in Bergen.
- Point of Departure (1978) - as Teddy Nelson and the Flying Norwegian
- This Time Around (1979)
- Du står i veien (1981)
- Still Riding (1996)

=== As Flyvende Nordmenn ===
==== with Teddy Nelson ====
- Diggy Liggy (1976)
- Jippi tai ooh... (1977)
- Teddy Nelson (1979)

=== Compilations ===
- Originals: New Day/Wounded Bird (1994)
- Here's to You 1974–1996 (2025)
