= Vassendgutane =

Norwegian band

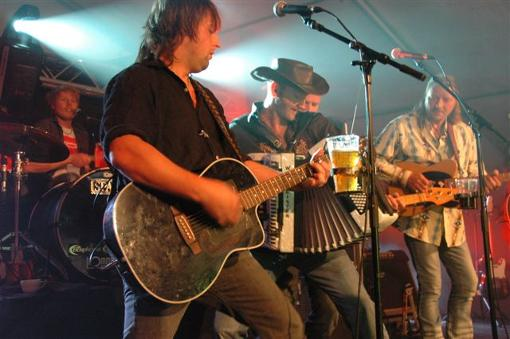
- Vassendgutane live in 2008.

Background information
- Origin: Ørsta, Norway
- Genres: Country
- Years active: 1996–present
- Members: Sindre Aam; Arthur Johan Bjørdal; Rune S. Brautaset; Ernst O. Brune; Kim Erik Lillestøl; Frank Willy Utgård; Alf Rune Melby
- Website: vassendgutane.no

Vassendgutane is a Norwegian country and danseband that have defined their own genre, 'party-country', a combination of the two.

The band was formed in Ørsta in 1996, and have since released seven albums and two DVDs.

== Members ==
- Sindre Aam – vocals, bass and lyrics
- Arthur Johan Bjørdal – vocals, guitar and lyrics
- Rune S. Brautaset – guitar, vocals and lyrics
- Ernst O. Brune – accordion
- Alf Rune Melby – steel
- Frank Willy Utgård – electric guitar
- Kim Erik Lillestøl – drums

== History ==
=== Beginning ===
Vassendgutane was established in 1996 by founding band members Sindre Aam (vocals, bass), Arthur Johan Bjørdal (vocals, acouistic guitar), Rune Brautaset (vocals, acouistic guitar), Ernst Brude (accordion), Henning Arsæther (Drums), and Jan Ove Hovdenakk (electric guitar). Vassendgutane's most important inspiration both in the beginning, but also throughout their career has been the norwegian countryartist Teddy Nelson. When Vassengutane released their first album Pylse og Konjakk in 2000 they had only written two of the songs in the album. There was one by artist Ivar Medaas, but the rest written originally by Teddy Nelson.

=== Early 2000's ===
On their second album Gi Clutch (2002) were all the album's song's self written, and Vassendgutane rose from a phenomenon to regional heroes. Most of their albums were sold in gas stations and in concert. In 2005 they released their third album Ungkar med dobbelseng. Soon the title track became known all over the country, helped by a music video directed by another man from Ørsta, Egil Olsen. The album sold well, and was on the norwegian music chart VG-lista for three weeks.

=== Breakthrough ===
Despite negative ratings from music critics and little to none radio time on national radio, Vassendgutane rose to new heights. With Vassendgutane's 4th album XO released in 2008 they finally got their big national breakthrough, and the album topped the VG-lista chart for two weeks.

In 2011, they released the album Riskrem og entrekått which also did well. Album nr.6, Festi e'kje slutt (2012) is a collection of Vassengutane's greatest hits, as well as four new songs. Since then Vassendgutane have released the albums Hesteslepp (2013), Skru Opp!! (2015) and Du & Ej & Metoo (2018). Vassendgutane have sold to either Gold or platinum certification in Norway for all their albums, and all together Vassendgutane have sold over 300 000 albums. Vassendgutane release all their songs and albums on their own label Vassend Records.

== Discography ==
=== Albums ===
Year	Album	Peak positions	Certification
Year	Album	NOR	Certification
2000	Pylse og konjakk	—	
2002	Gi clutch	—	
2005	Ungkar med dobbelseng	27	
2008	XO	1	
2010	Julefest i vest	31	
2011	Riskrem og entrekått	6	
2012	Festi e'kje slutt	9	
2013	Hesteslepp	1	
2015	Skru opp!!	1	
2018	Du & ej & MeToo	4	

=== Singles and Ep's ===
- 2001: "Køyr mej ned te vik"
- 2009: "Diggy liggy lo"
- 2012: "Stein, torv og grus"
- 2013: "Ho va so fine/Bygdis"
- 2017: "Hjertestartar og statoilkopp"
- 2017: "Køyr mej heimatt"
- 2018: "MeToo"
- 2019: "Skalldyrfest"
- 2019: "Sånn so det va før"
- 2020: "Hurragutt"
- 2021: "Longt Inne I En Fjord"
- 2022: "Skrekkraude Rapala"
- 2023: "Kongen av Norge"
- 2024: "10.000 Skritt"

=== DVD ===
- 2006: Vassendgutane LIVE! Rockefeller
- 2009: Vassendgutane LIVE! Treungen
