= Triola =

Children's musical instrument

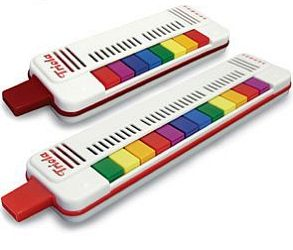
The Triolas

The triola ( listen) is a children's musical instrument, a hand-tuned single-tone wind harmonica. Triolas are manufactured by C. A. Seydel Söhne in Klingenthal, Germany.

The triola is designed to teach children from the age of two and above how to read and play music. It works by blowing into the instrument and pressing the coloured keys. The coloured keys correspond with the coloured notes on the music.

It is available in two sizes: a model with 12 notes from G to D, 26.4 cm (10.4 in) in length and a model with eight notes (an octave) from middle C to C, 20.4 cm (8.0 in) in length.

== See also ==
- Melodica
