= Emilie Nicolas =

Norwegian singer-songwriter (born 1987)

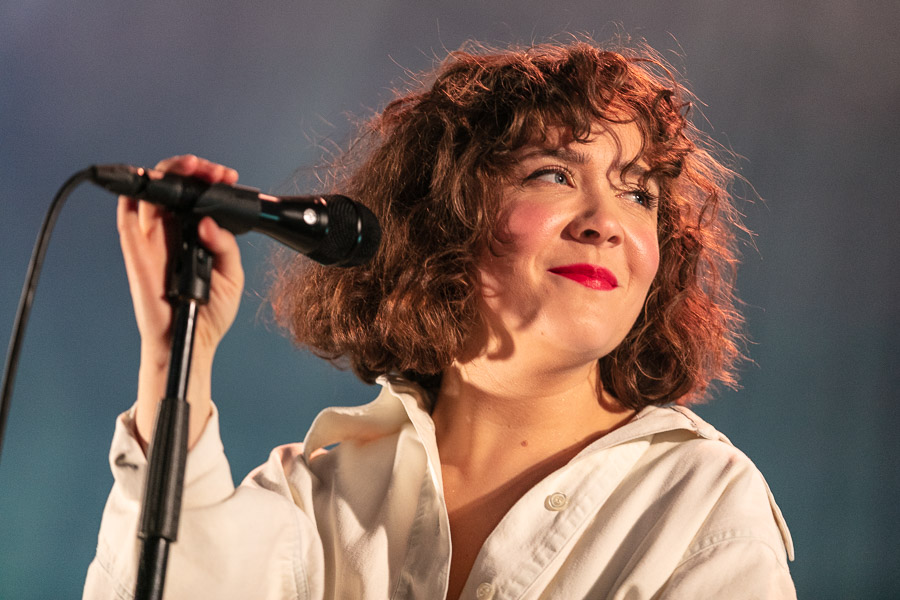
- Sentrum Scene, Oslo, Norway in 2018

Background information
- Born: 26 November 1987 (age 38)
- Occupation: Singer-songwriter
- Years active: 2013–present
- Partner: Herbert Nordrum
- Website: emilienicolas.com

Emilie Nicolas Kongshavn (born 26 November 1987), known under the stage name Emilie Nicolas, is a Norwegian singer-songwriter from Bærum. She is best known for her jazz-inspired vocals and electronic sound. During her career, she has released 3 studio albums and has won 4 Norwegian Grammys (Spellemannprisen) - two for Best Pop Artist in 2014 and 2018, one for Best Debut Album (Like I’m a Warrior) in 2014, and one for Album of the Year (Tranquille Emile) in 2018. She also collaborated with Icelandic producer Björk on her 2022 album Fossora, providing vocals on the song "Allow". Nicolas is also known for her role on the Norwegian sitcom Hvite gutter (2018–2022), playing Melissa, the girlfriend of Herman Roger Backe.

== Discography ==
=== Albums ===
- Like I'm a Warrior (2014)
- Tranquille Emile (2018)
- Let Her Breathe (2020)

=== Singles ===
- "Grown Up" (2013)
- "Pstereo" (2013)
- "Sky" (2017)
- "Higher Love" (2018)
- "Wild One" (2018)
- "Feel Fine" (2018)
- "Who’s Gonna Love You" (2020)
- "If I Call" (2020)

=== Collaborations ===
- "Allow" with Björk, on Fossora (2022)
