= Hellbillies =

Norwegian rock band

Background information
- Origin: Ål, Hallingdal, Norway
- Genres: Rock country rock
- Years active: 1990-present
- Labels: EMI
- Members: Aslag Haugen; Lars Håvard Haugen; Bjørn Gunnar Sando; Lars Christian Narum; Egil Stemkens
- Past members: Arne Henry Sandum; Arne Moslåtten
- Website: hellbillies.com

Hellbillies is a Norwegian rock band, formed in 1990 in Ål, a town located in Hallingdal.

== Profile and history ==
Hellbellies are among Norway's most popular recording artists. As of 2012, they have released 13 albums—including a compilation and two live albums—as well as three live concert DVDs. Their lyrics are written and sung in the dialect of the Hallingdal area of Norway, and there is evidence of influence from traditional (folk) Norwegian music, giving a distinctive "Norwegian" flavor to their country music.

Their early albums often included songs originally recorded by country music artists from the US with Hellbillies writing new lyrics in the Ål dialect of Norwegian, with the settings of the lyrics differing sharply from the source songs. Examples include Ei krasafaren steinbu (Past the Point of Rescue by Hal Ketchum) and Pela stein (Against the Grain by Garth Brooks).

Later efforts have included much more original material that reflect contemporary Norwegian people and Norwegian life and issues. They have also gradually changed their musical style from country to rock.

They have collaborated with musicians from the US. For example, Rob Hajacos from Nashville, who plays the fiddle on most Garth Brooks albums, Rob plays on three of Hellbillies’ albums.

In 2013 Hellbillies appeared at the Kongsberg Jazz Festival performing together with Jazz guests the Violin virtuoso Ola Kvernberg and the super trumpeter Mathias Eick. In 2013 they also contributed to the book Think Like a Rockstar (Tenk som en rockestjerne, written by Ståle Økland.

== Band members ==
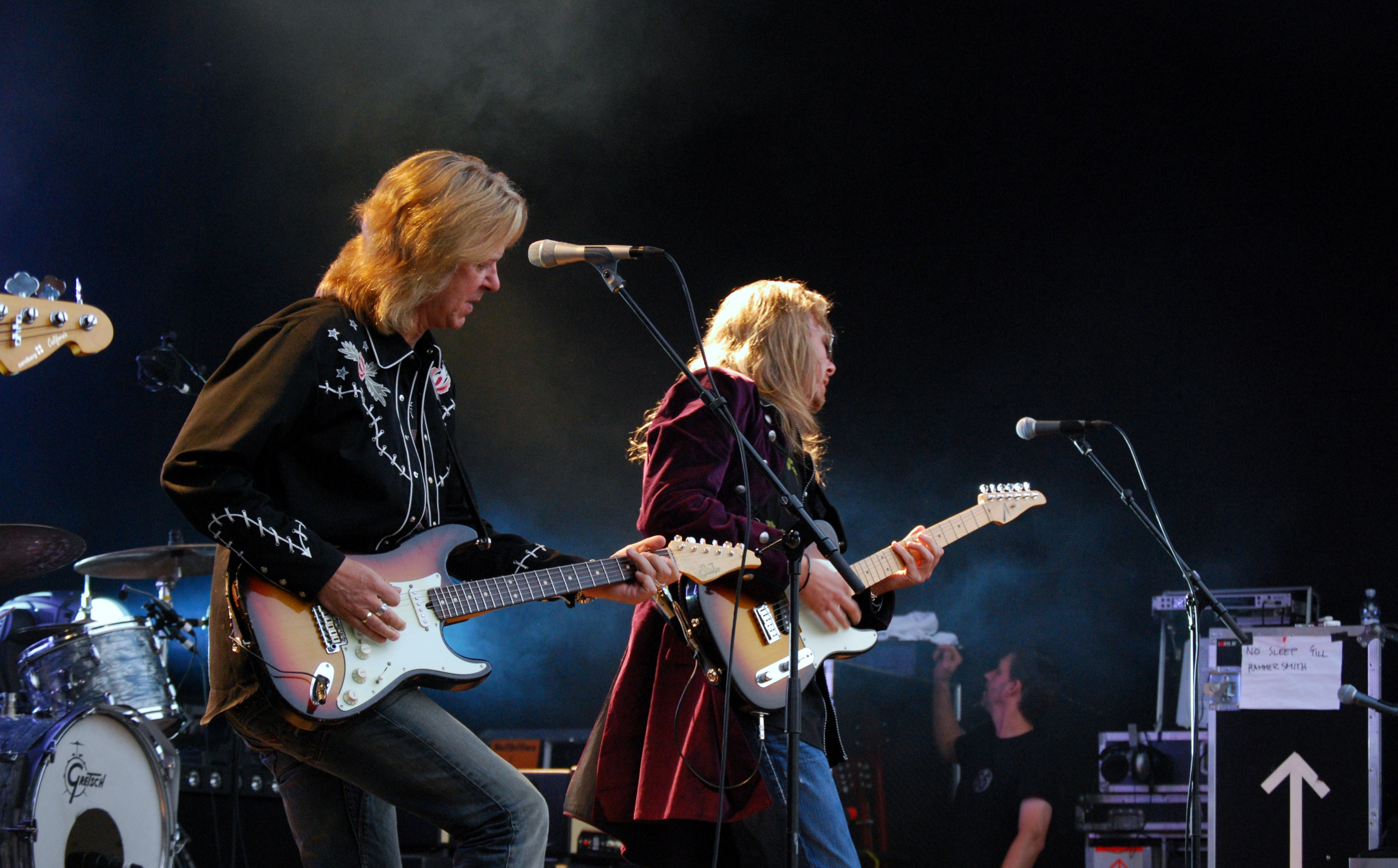
Hellbillies during a concert in Langesund, July 2011.

Current members

- Aslag Haugen – lead vocals, electric and acoustic guitars (1990–present)
- Lars Håvard Haugen – electric guitars, harmony and lead vocals (1990–present)
- Bjørn Gunnar Sando – drums (1990–present)

Live and studio members

- Egil Stemkens – bass, harmony vocals (2016–present)
- Lars Christian Narum – piano and organ (2003–present)

Former members

- Arne Moslåtten – accordion, flute, acoustic guitar, percussion (1990-2013), lyrics (1990-today)
- Arne Henry Sandum – bass (1990-2016)
- Lasse Hafreager – piano and organ (1993-2000)
- Trond Nagell Dahl – piano and organ (2001-2003)

== Honors ==
- 1993: Spellemannprisen in the class Country-rock awarded for the album Pela Stein
- 2007: Spellemannprisen awarded Spellemann of the Year for the album Spissrotgang
- 2022: Spellemannprisen awarded the honorary award for their long running career.

== Discography ==
=== Studio albums ===
- Sylvspente Boots (1992)
- Pela Stein (1993)
- Lakafant (1995)
- Drag (1996)
- Sol Over Livet (1999)
- Urban Twang (2001)
- Niende (2004)
- Spissrotgang (2007)
- Leite etter Lykka (2010)
- Tretten (2012)
- Søvnlaus (2016)
- Blå dag (2021)

=== Live albums ===
- Live Laga (1997)
- CoolTur (2002)
- Levande Live (2014)
- 30 år på vegen (Live 2020-2021) (2024)

=== Singles and EPs ===
- "Hallo Telenor" (2007)
- "Den finast eg veit (2013)" (2013)
- "Dirkefri Live" (2014)
- "I eksil på sundrehall" (2020)
- "Blå dag" (2020)

Awards
Preceded by Vamp	Recipient of the Spellemannprisen as This year's Spellemann; 2007	Succeeded by Espen Lind
