= Sylvspente Boots =

Studio album by Hellbillies
- Released: 1992
- Genre: Country rock
- Label: EMI Norway
- Producer: Lars Håvard Haugen

Hellbillies chronology
Sylvspente Boots (1992)	Pela Stein (1993)

Sylvspente Boots is the first album by the Norwegian country group Hellbillies. The album was released in 1992 through Spinner Records.

== Track listing ==
No.	Title	Writer(s)	Length
1.	"Nyskild Far (Hello Trouble)"	Eddie McDuff, Orville Couch	1:54
2.	"Ho Birgjit Lien (Sweet Rosie Jones)"	Buck Owens	3:21
3.	"Biologisk Bonde (Fishing Into Mississippi)"	B. Morris	2:08
4.	"Eitt Skot Te (One More Shot)"	Paul Kennerly	4:15
5.	"Heime Høvde 'Kji Eg (Honky Tonk Man)"	H. Hansey, J. Horton, T. Franks	2:52
6.	"Eg Rykte Upp Mine Røter (The Plainsman)"		3:20
7.	"Aksjon På Ål (The Race Is On)"	Don Rollins	2:29
8.	"Goffa Min Va Handelskar (Grandpa Was A Carpenter)"	John Prine	2:13
9.	"Heite Hilde (Please, Please Baby)"	Dwight Yoakam	4:38
10.	"Rakafisk (Guitars, Cadillacs)"	Dwight Yoakam	3:06
11.	"Ikkje Grav Meg Ned (Please Don't Bury Me)"	John Prine	2:49
12.	"Arket Mitt Æ Kvitt (I Quit)"	Max D. Barnes, Vince Gill	2:29
