= Spissrotgang =

Studio album by Hellbillies
- Released: 15 October 2007
- Genre: Country rock
- Label: EMI Norway
- Producer: Lars Håvard Haugen

Hellbillies chronology
Niende (2004)	Spissrotgang (2007)

Spissrotgang (English: Run The Gauntlet) is the eighth album by the Norwegian country group Hellbillies. The album was released on October 15, 2007 through EMI Records Norway. As of November 2009, it has sold over 35,000 copies in Norway.

== Track listing ==
No.	Title	Length
1.	"Mot Straumen (Against the Tide)"
2.	"Spissrotgang"
3.	"Gamle Spor (Old Tracks)"
4.	"Ingen der (No one there)"
5.	"Livsfarlig leik (Dangerous Game)"
6.	"6000 Hål (6000 Holes)"
7.	"Fint å væra to (Good to Be Two)"
8.	"Mørkemann (The Dark Man)"
9.	"Drukne ei gudinne (Drowning a Goddess)"
10.	"Svelg ein kamel (Swallow a Camel)"
11.	"Ukjent by (Unknown City)"
12.	"Hallo Telenor (Hello Telenor)"

== Credits ==
- Aslag Haugen - Vocals, Acoustic Guitar
- Lars Håvard Haugen - Guitar, Mandolin, Steel Guitar [Pedal], Backing Vocals
- Arne Sandum - Bass
- Arne Moslåtten - Flute, Accordion
- Bjørn Gunnar Sando - Drums
- Kyrre Sætran - Bass
- Lars Christian Narum - Organ, Piano, Electric Piano [Wurlitzer], Keyboards [Harmonium], Mellotron
- Trond Nagell Dahl - Backing Vocals (Livsfarleg Leik)
- Tove Margrethe Erikstad - Cello (Gamle Spor)
- Trond Augland - Percussion
- Cammilla Kjøll - Viola (Gamle Spor)
- Lina Årnes - Violin (Gamle Spor)
- Lise Sørensen - (Gamle Spor)
- Hilde Heltberg - Vocals (Gamle Spor, Ukjend By, Drukne Ei Gudinne)
