= VG-lista =

Norwegian music website

VG-lista is the primary Norwegian record chart, charting albums and singles from Norwegian and international artists. It is presented weekly in the newspaper VG. The data is collected by Nielsen Soundscan International and based on the sales in approximately 100 shops in Norway. The singles chart started as a top 10 chart in week 42 of 1958 and was expanded to a top 20 chart in week 5 of 1995, the same time as the albums chart, which started as a top 20 chart in week 1 of 1967, was expanded to a top 40 chart. It expanded even further into a top 100 chart in week 14 of 2025.

== Charts published ==
The charts published weekly are:

- Top 100 Singles (until week 43 in 2014, a Top 20 Singles chart; until week 14 in 2025, a Top 40 Singles chart)
- Top 100 Albums
- Top 10 Samlealbums (compilation albums)
- DVD Audio
- Top 10 Singles Norsk (only Norwegian language singles)
- Top 30 Albums Norsk (only Norwegian language albums)

== See also ==
- List of number-one songs in Norway
- List of number-one albums in Norway
