= Pelt (disambiguation) =

A pelt is the fur and skin of an animal.

Pelt or Pelts may also refer to:

== Arts and entertainment ==
- Pelt (band), American drone music band
  - Pelt (album), 2005
- "Pelts" (Masters of Horror), an episode of the TV series
- The Pelt, poetry book/CD by Doseone

== People ==
- Adriaan Pelt (1892–1981), a Dutch journalist and international diplomat
- Jean-Marie Pelt (1933–2015), French botanist
- Roman Pelts (1937–2022), Ukrainian-Canadian chess master

== Other uses ==
- Pelt (municipality), Belgium
- Gotland Pelt, a breed of domestic sheep

== See also ==
- Pelte (disambiguation)
- Van Pelt, a surname
- Pet
