= Villain =

Evil character or person

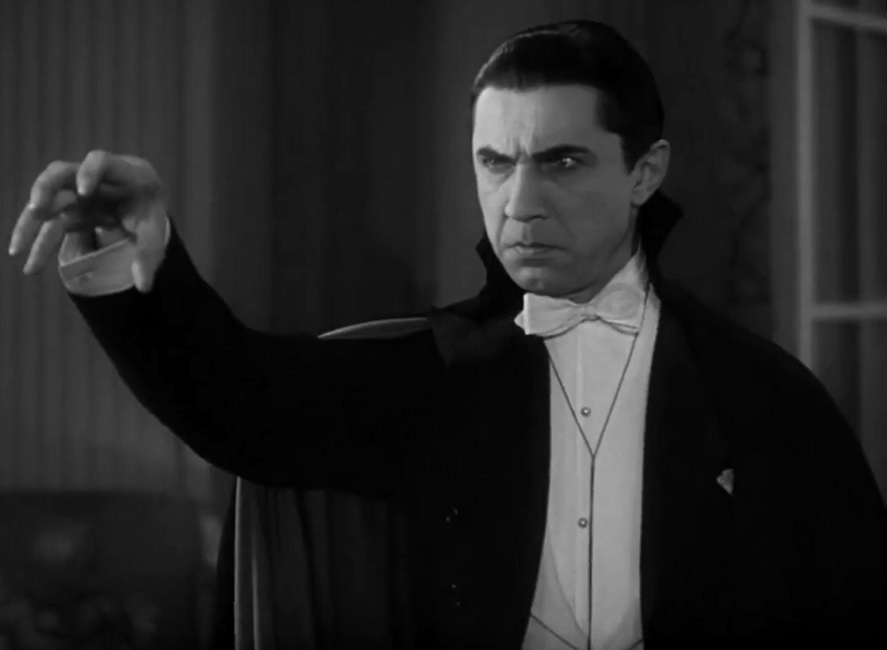
Count Dracula is an example of a villain in classic literature and film.

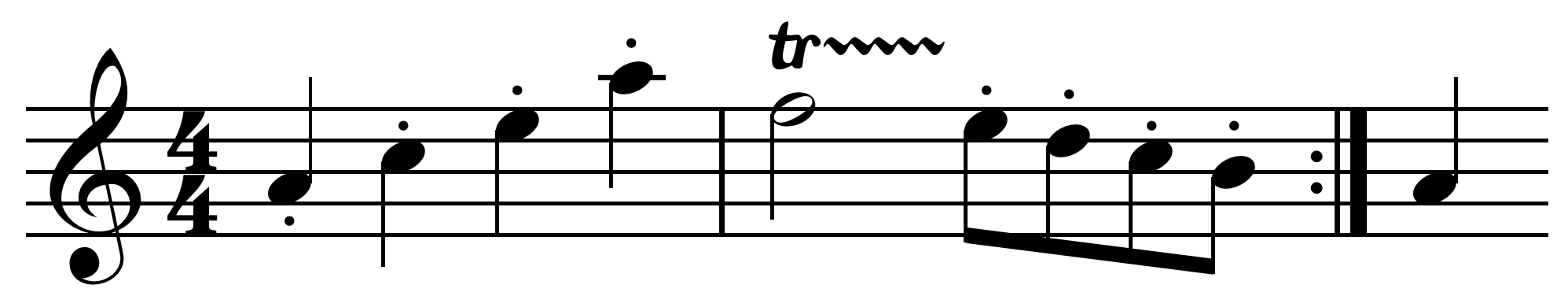
Theme from Mysterioso Pizzicato, a cliché silent movie cue for villainy

A villain (feminine: villainess) is a real person or fictional character who is defined as a cruel and malicious person involved in or devoted to wickedness or crime; or a character in a play, novel, or the like, who constitutes an important evil agency in the plot". The antonym of a villain is a hero.

The villain's structural purpose is to serve as the opposite to the hero character, and their motives or evil actions drive a plot along. In contrast to the hero, who is defined by feats of ingenuity and bravery and the pursuit of justice and the greater good, a villain is often defined by their acts of selfishness, evilness, arrogance, cruelty, and cunning, displaying immoral behavior that can oppose or pervert justice.

== Etymology ==
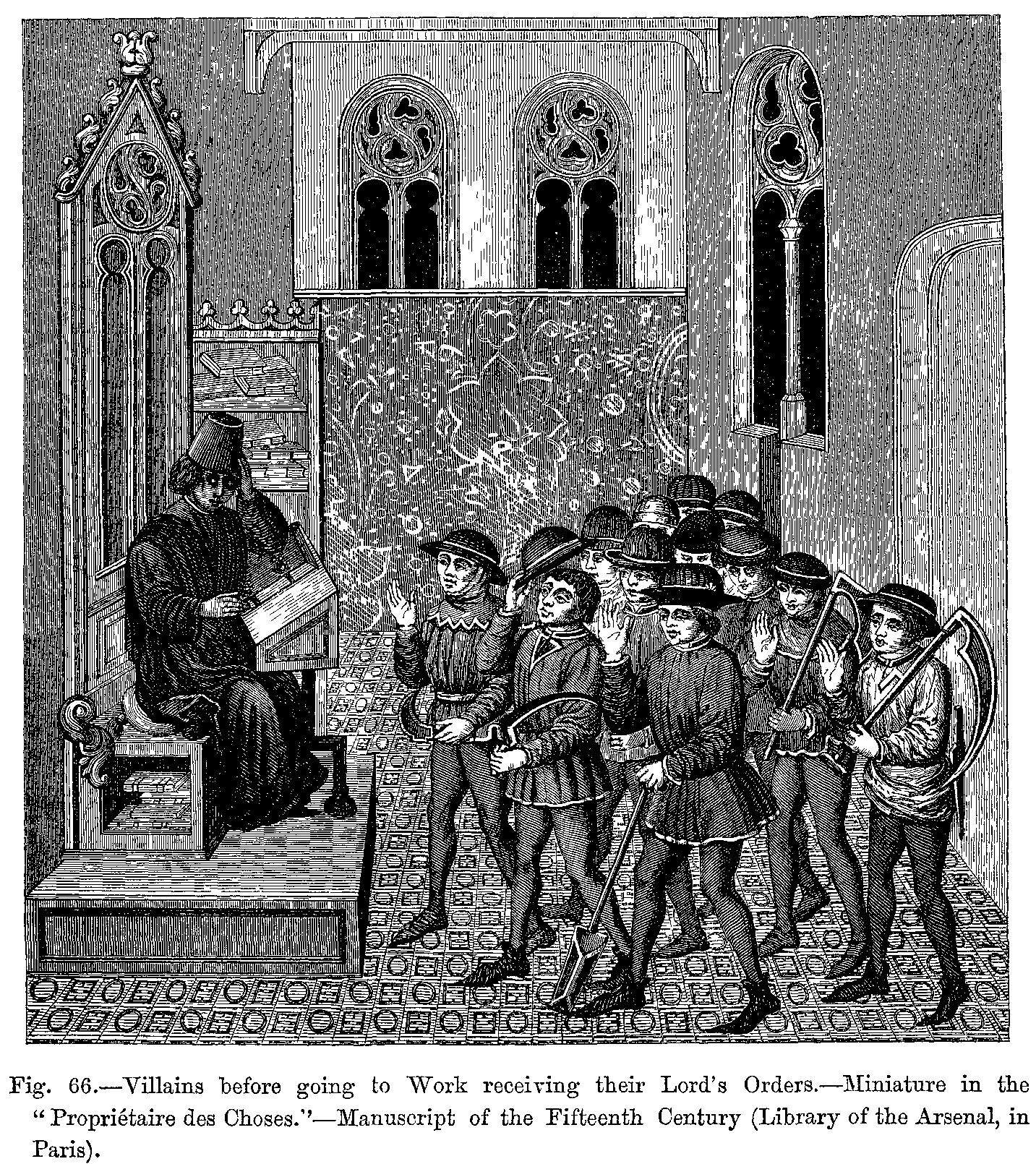
French villains in the 15th century before going to work, receiving their lord's orders

The term villain first came into English from the Anglo-French and Old French vilain, which in turn derives from the Late Latin word villanus. This refers to those bound to the soil of the villa, who worked on the equivalent of a modern estate in Late Antiquity, in Italy or Gaul.

Vilain later shifted to villein, which referred to a person of less than knightly status, implying a lack of chivalry and courtesy. All actions that were unchivalrous or evil (such as treachery or rape) eventually became part of the identity of a villain in the modern sense of the word. Additionally, villein came into use as a term of abuse and eventually took on its modern meaning.

The landed aristocracy of mediaeval Europe used politically and linguistically the Middle English descendant of villanus meaning "villager" (styled as vilain or vilein) with the meaning "a person of uncouth mind and manners". As the common equating of manners with morals gained in strength and currency, the connotations worsened, so that the modern word villain is no unpolished villager but is instead (among other things) a deliberate scoundrel or criminal.

At the same time, the medieval expression "vilein" or "vilain" is closely influenced by the word "vile", referring to something wicked or worthless. As from the late 13th century, vile meant "morally repugnant; morally flawed, corrupt, wicked; of no value; of inferior quality; disgusting, foul, ugly; degrading, humiliating; of low estate, without worldly honor or esteem", from Anglo-French ville, Old French vil, from Latin vilis "cheap, worthless, of low value".

== Classical literature ==
In classical literature, the villain character is not always the same as those that appear in modern and postmodern incarnations, as the lines of morality are often blurred to imply a sense of ambiguity or affected by historical context and cultural ideas. Often the delineation of heroes and villains in such literature is left unclear. Nevertheless, there are some exceptions to this, such as Grendel from Beowulf, who is unambiguously evil.

William Shakespeare modelled his archetypical villains as three-dimensional characters and acknowledged the complex nature that villains display in modern literature. For instance, he made Shylock a sympathetic character. However, Shakespeare's incarnations of historical figures were influenced by the propaganda pieces coming from Tudor sources, and his works often showed this bias and discredited their reputation. For example, Shakespeare famously portrayed Richard III as a hideous monster who destroyed his family out of spite. Shakespeare also ensured that Iago in Othello and Antonio in The Tempest were completely void of redeeming traits.

== Folk and fairy tales ==
=== Russian fairy tales ===
In an analysis of Russian fairy tales, Vladimir Propp concluded that the majority of stories had only eight "dramatis personae", one being the villain. This analysis has been widely applied to non-Russian tales. The actions within a villain's sphere were:

- a story-initiating villainy, where the villain caused harm to the hero or his family
- a conflict between the hero and the villain, either a fight or other competition
- pursuing the hero after he has succeeded in winning the fight or obtaining something from the villain

When a character displays these traits, it is not necessarily tropes specific to the fairy tale genre, but it does imply that the one who performs certain acts to be the villain. The villain, therefore, can appear twice in a story to fulfill certain roles: once in the opening of the story, and a second time as the person sought out by the hero.

When a character has only performed actions or displayed traits that coincide with Vladimir Propp's analysis, that character can be identified as a pure villain. Folklore and fairy tale villains can also play a myriad of roles that can influence or propel a story forward. In fairy tales, villains can perform an influential role; for example, a witch who fought the hero and ran away, and who lets the hero follow her, is also performing the task of "guidance" and thus acting as a helper.

Propp also proposed another two archetypes of the villain's role within the narrative, in which they can portray themselves as villainous in a more general sense. The first is the false hero: This character is always villainous, presenting a false claim to be the hero that must be rebutted for the happy ending. Examples of characters who display this trait, and interfere with the success of a tale's hero, are the Ugly Sisters in Cinderella who chopped off parts of their feet to fit in the shoe.

Another role for the villain would be the dispatcher, who sends the hero on their quest. At the beginning of the story, their request may appear benevolent or innocent, but the dispatcher's real intentions might be to send the hero on a journey in the hopes of being rid of them.

The roles and influence that villains can have over a narrative can also be transferred to other characters – to continue their role in the narrative through another character. The legacy of the villain is often transferred through that of bloodlines (family) or a devoted follower. For example, if a dragon played the role of a villain but was killed by the hero, another character (such as the dragon's sister) might take on the legacy of the previous villain and pursue the hero out of revenge.

== Animated villains ==
Animation is home to several different villains. Winsor McCay in How a Mosquito Operates had a cartoon mosquito torment a human being and in 1925, Walt Disney created Pete as an antagonist for the Alice Comedies with Pete later becoming an antagonist of Mickey Mouse and his friends and the first Disney villain. Fleischer Studios later had Bluto as the antagonist of the Popeye cartoons. Hanna-Barbera created Tom as an antagonist of Jerry. Likewise, the Looney Tunes had villains like Elmer Fudd, Yosemite Sam, Marvin the Martian, Wile E. Coyote, and Blacque Jacque Shellacque.

In 1937, Disney made the movie Snow White and the Seven Dwarfs and it had the Evil Queen as its antagonist. Since then, Disney made a number of other animated movies with villains based on fairy tale villains. Disney Villains became a major part of that franchise.

Saturday-morning cartoons also had villains like Dick Dastardly, Muttley and Snidely Whiplash. Since then, cartoon villains have had a reputation for being one-dimensional.

In modern animation, animated villains that are more significant and fleshed out have become increasingly common as cartoons have begun to be favored by adults. Shows such as Adventure Time, Gravity Falls, and Rick and Morty range from child to adult cartoons but are all watched by a largely older audience.

Sattar Sharmin and Sanyat Tania have argued that animated villains frequently fall into two categories: women who exhibit undesirable traits, or men displaying feminine traits. Specifically, they claim that female villains are often portrayed as ugly or venal, while male villains tend not to be. Zachary Doiron has additionally argued that animated villains are frequently based on homophobic stereotypes.

== Villainous foil ==
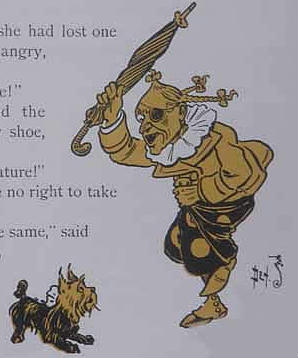
The Wicked Witch of the West from The Wonderful Wizard of Oz is an example of a literary villain.

Villains in fiction commonly function in the dual role of adversary and foil to a story's heroes. In their role as an adversary, the villain serves as an obstacle the hero must struggle to overcome. In their role as a foil, they exemplify characteristics that are diametrically opposed to those of the hero, creating a contrast distinguishing heroic traits from villainous ones.

Other have pointed out that many acts of villains have a hint of wish-fulfillment, which makes some readers or viewers identify with them as characters more strongly than with the heroes. Because of this, a convincing villain must be given a characterization that provides a motive for doing wrong, as well as being a worthy adversary to the hero. As put by film critic Roger Ebert: "Each film is only as good as its villain. Since the heroes and the gimmicks tend to repeat from film to film, only a great villain can transform a good try into a triumph."

== Portraying and employing villains in fiction ==
The actor Tod Slaughter typically portrayed villainous characters on both stage and screen in a melodramatic manner, with mustache-twirling, eye-rolling, leering, cackling, and hand-rubbing.

== Villains in film ==
In 1895, Thomas Edison and Alfred Clark made The Execution of Mary Stuart depicting Mary, Queen of Scots being decapitated. It describes neither Mary nor her executioner as villains (though at the time, it was deemed so realistic that audience members believed an actual woman had been beheaded in the making of that film.) In 1896, Georges Méliès made a horror film titled The House of the Devil which had The Devil as an antagonist. Edison's The Great Train Robbery, released in 1903 had the bandits who rob the train as its villains. In 1909, there was a feature length adaptation of Les Misérables with Javert as a villain and in 1910, Otis Turner had a Wicked Witch as the villain of a short film adaptation of The Wonderful Wizard of Oz. In 1914, Lois Weber made a film of The Merchant of Venice with Phillips Smalley as a villainous Shylock.

The 1915 film The Birth of a Nation has "Northern carpetbaggers" inciting black violence as its villains. The 1916 film 20,000 Leagues Under the Sea has a man named Charles Denver as its villain. In the same year, Snow White had Queen Brongomar as a villain. The 1923 film The Ten Commandments has the main character's brother be a villain due to his commitment to breaking all of the Ten Commandments. In 1937, Walt Disney's Snow White and the Seven Dwarfs had the Evil Queen as a villain. In 1939, The Wizard of Oz had Wicked Witch of the West as its villain. In the 1940s, serial films about superheroes introduced supervillains as characters like Dr. Dana in Batman. The 1949 film Samson and Delilah has Hedy Lamarr as the villainous Delilah and George Sanders as the villainous Prince of Gaza.

In 1953, Byron Haskin made a film of The War of the Worlds. Like the book, it has Martians as villains.

Cecil B. DeMille's 1956 remake of The Ten Commandments had two main villains. Ramesses II, played by Yul Brynner and Dathan played by Edward G. Robinson. (It also had Nefertari be a Lady Macbeth figure egging Ramesses on.)

In 1960, the film Spartacus had Marcus Licinius Crassus as its villain. In the same year, the film Psycho had Norman Bates as a villainous protagonist. The 1962 film To Kill a Mockingbird, like the book, had Bob Ewell as its villain. Other 1960s films like The Guns of Navarone and The Great Escape had Nazis as their villains.

Beginning with Dr. No in 1962, every James Bond film has had a villain.

There were also villains in 1960s children's film. For instance, 101 Dalmatians and the 1966 Batman both had villains. The former having Cruella de Vil and the latter being the first time comic book supervillains were adapted to film.

In the 1970s and early 1980s, the Star Wars films introduced Darth Vader and Emperor Palpatine.

1980s films had villains like Khan in Star Trek, John Kreese in The Karate Kid and its sequels, Skynet in the Terminator films, Biff Tannen in the Back to the Future films, The Joker in Batman and Dark Helmet in Spaceballs.

1990s films had villains like General Mandible in Antz, Dennis Nedry in Jurassic Park, Edgar in Men in Black, Van Pelt in Jumanji, Rameses in The Prince of Egypt, Carrigan in Casper and Shan-Yu in Mulan. The Star Wars prequels also introduced several villains in addition to those the franchise already had.

Early 2000s films like the Spider-Man trilogy, The Dark Knight Trilogy, the Harry Potter films, The Lord of the Rings films and Avatar all had villains like, Green Goblin, Two-Face, Lord Voldemort, Saruman and Miles Quaritch.

In the 2010s, the Marvel Cinematic Universe and the DC Extended Universe have had several notable supervillains such as Thanos and General Zod.

== Female villain ==
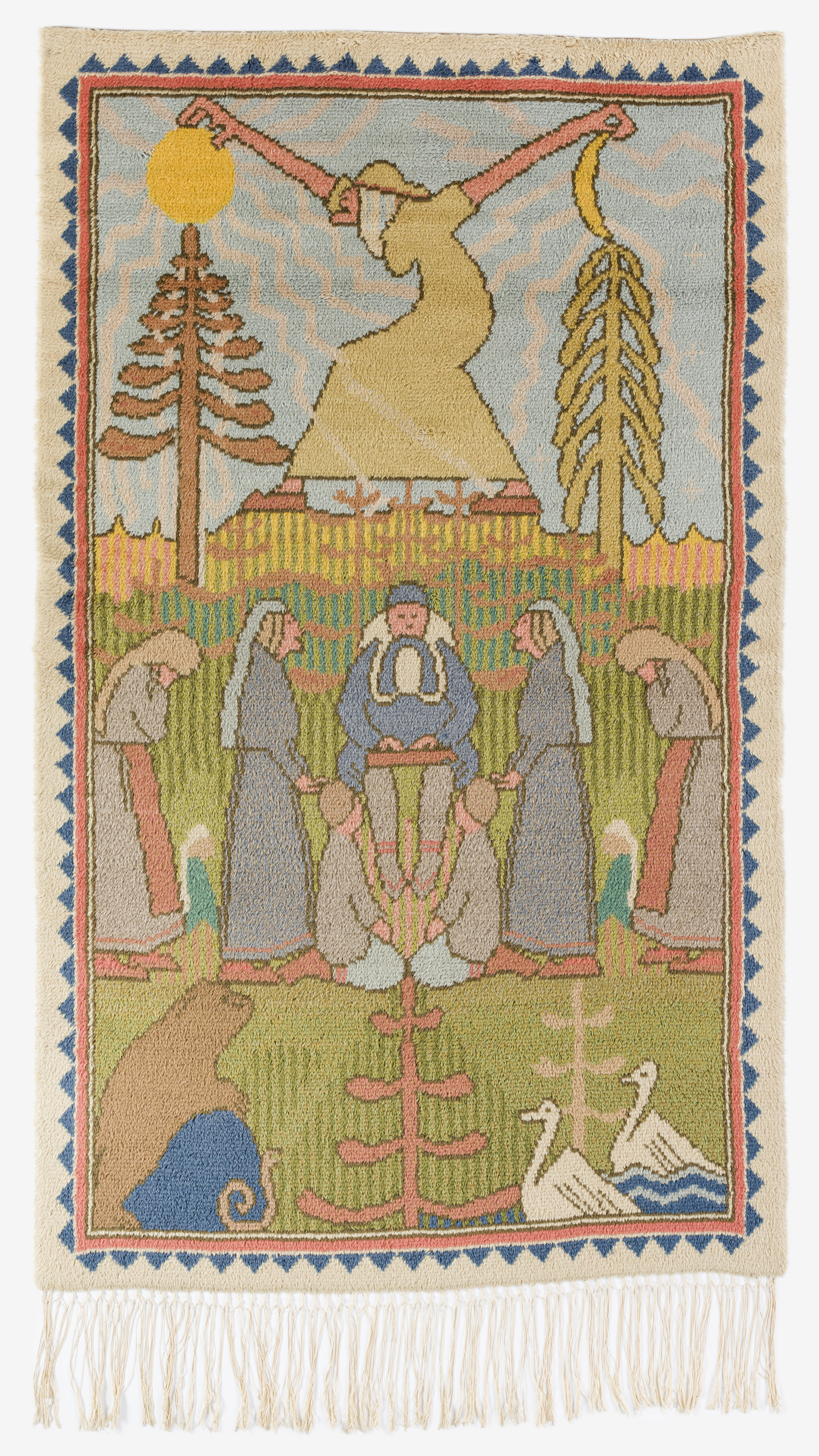
Louhi, the wicked queen and mistress of Pohjola, is a villain of the Finnish epic poetry compilation Kalevala. Rya of Louhi stealing the sun and the moon, Joseph Alanen, c. 1909.

The term villain is the universal term for characters who pose as catalysts for certain ideals that readers or observers find immoral, but the term "villainess" is often used to highlight specific traits that come with their female identity—separating them, in some aspects, from their male counterparts. The use of the female villain (or villainess) is often to highlight the traits that come specifically with the character and the abilities they possess that are exclusive to them. For example, one of the female villain's greatest weapons is her alluring beauty, sexuality or emotional intelligence. The perversion of inherently female traits in storytelling also alludes to the demonic display of the succubus and their affinity for utilizing their beauty as a weapon—a trait utilized by many female villains throughout modern fiction and mythology. However, this is not always the case. As seen often in animated films, female villains are portrayed with "ugly" appearances to contrast the beauty of the protagonist, in turn associating unattractiveness with evil. This paints female villains in a negative light compared to their heroine counterparts and showcases the duality of the female villain character.

=== Villainess genre ===
The villainess genre, largely based in Japanese manga, anime and light novels, is usually an isekai story featuring LitRPG video game logic in which a normal woman is reincarnated as a villainess in a world based on those of otome games (female-oriented romance visual novels). This villainess character would typically be a roadblock to the protagonist's romantic ambitions and perish at the end of the story, even though few real-life otome games contain equivalent characters, and such a stock character is more commonplace in shōjo manga. Being forced to take the role of the villainess, the protagonist must avoid their untimely death at the end of the in-universe "story". These stories are used to defy typical gender roles, with such villainess characters being depicted as drastically less feminine than their otome protagonist foils.

== Use of the term "villain" to describe historical figures and real-life people ==
The ethical dimension of history poses the problem of judging those who acted in the past, and at times, tempts scholars and historians to construct a world of black and white in which the terms "hero" and "villain" are used arbitrary and with the pass of time become interchangeable. These binaries of course are reflected to varying degrees in endless movies, novels, and other fictional and non-fictional narratives.

As processes of globalization connect the world, cultures with different historical trajectories and political traditions will need to find ways to work together not only economically, but also politically. In this evolving framework of globalization, tradition, according to political theorists like Edmund Burke, historical figures perceived and evaluated as either positive or negative become the embodiment of national political cultures that may collude or collide against one another.

The usage of villain to describe a historical figure dates back to the propaganda of the House of Tudor, pieces of which ended up influencing William Shakespeare's portrayal of Richard III as a spiteful and hunchback tyrant.

== Sympathetic villain ==
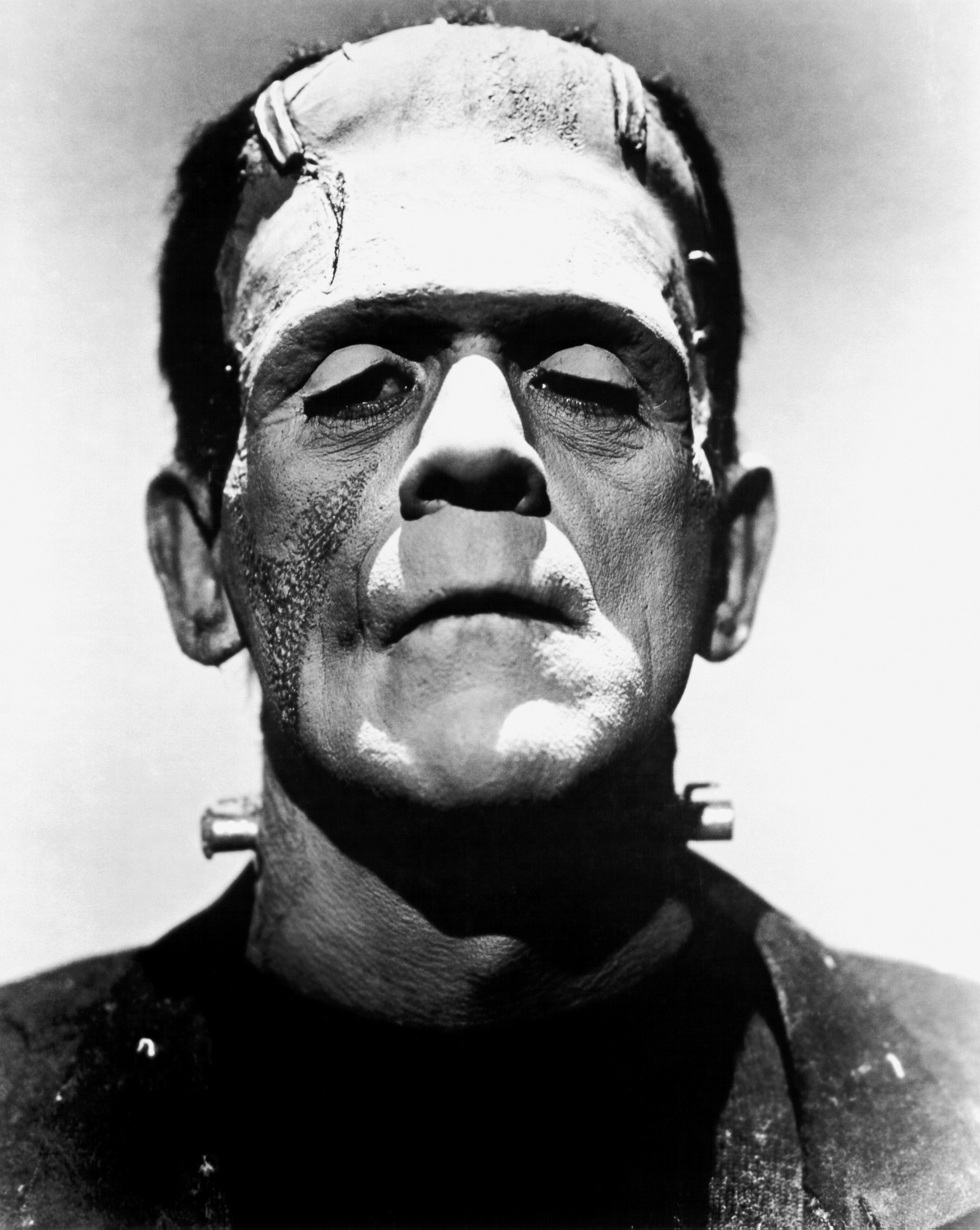
Frankenstein's monster, an example of a sympathetic villain

The sympathetic villain, anti-villain or tragic villain is one with the typical traits of a villainous character but differs in their motivations. Their intention to cause chaos or commit evil actions is driven by an ambiguous motivation or is not driven by an intent to cause evil. Their intentions may coincide with the ideals of a greater good, or even a desire to make the world a better place, but their actions are inherently evil in nature. An anti-villain is the opposite of an antihero. While the antihero often fights on the side of good, but with questionable or selfish motives, the anti-villain plays a villain's game, but for a noble cause in a way that the audience or other characters can sympathize with. They may be more noble or heroic than an antihero, but the means to achieve their ends are often considered exploitative, immoral, unjust, or simply evil. Characters who fall into this category are often created with the intention of humanizing them, making them more relatable to the reader/viewer by posing the "how" and "why" behind their motivations rather than simply creating a one-dimensional character. Because of their motives, many of these types of villains are commonly nicknamed "anti-villains".

American writer Brad Warner has argued that "only cartoon villains cackle with glee while rubbing their hands together and dream of ruling the world in the name of all that is wicked and bad". American writer Ben Bova recommends to writers that their works not contain villains. He states, in his Tips for writers:

In the real world there are no villains. No one actually sets out to do evil . . . Fiction mirrors life. Or, more accurately, fiction serves as a lens to focus on what they know in life and bring its realities into sharper, clearer understanding for us. There are no villains cackling and rubbing their hands in glee as they contemplate their evil deeds. There are only people with problems, struggling to solve them.

Following up on Bova's point, American writer David Lubar adds that the villain "may be driven by greed, neuroses, or the conviction that his cause is just, but he's driven by something, not unlike the things that drive a hero."

== See also ==
- Adversary
- Antagonist
- Antihero
- Archnemesis
- Archenemy
- Criminal
- Enemy
- Evil laughter
- Heel (professional wrestling)
- List of soap opera villains
- Lovable rogue
- Nemesis (mythology)
- Raoul Villain
- Rival (disambiguation)
- Supervillain
