= Pearls from the River =

Studio album by Pelt
- Released: October 14, 2003
- Recorded: March, 2003 in Ironto, Virginia
- Genre: Drone, experimental rock
- Length: 43:56
- Label: VHF
- Producer: Bill Kellum, Pelt

Pelt chronology
Ayahuasca (2001)	Pearls from the River (2003)	Pelt (2005)

Professional ratings
Review scores
Source	Rating
Allmusic	3/5 stars

Pearls from the River is the seventh album by Pelt, released on October 14, 2003, through VHF Records.

== Track listing ==
All tracks are written by Pelt.

No.	Title	Length
1.	"Up the North Fork"	8:30
2.	"Pearls from the River"	20:20
3.	"Road to Catawaba"	15:06

== Personnel ==
Pelt

- Patrick Best – bass guitar, cello
- Mike Gangloff – banjo, esraj, tanpura
- Jack Rose – guitar, baritone banjo

Production and additional personnel

- Mikel Dimmick – recording
- Bill Kellum – production
- Justin Lucas – illustrations
- Pelt – production
