= Max Meadows =

Studio album by Pelt
- Released: March 24, 1997
- Recorded: October 31, 1995–September 25, 1996
- Genre: Drone, experimental rock
- Length: 74:03
- Label: VHF

Pelt chronology
Burning/Filament/Rockets (1995)	Max Meadows (1997)	Técheöd (1998)

Professional ratings
Review scores
Source	Rating
Allmusic	4/5 stars

Max Meadows is the third album by Pelt, released on March 24, 1997 through VHF Records.

== Track listing ==
All tracks are written by Pelt.

No.	Title	Length
1.	"Outside, Listening"	10:40
2.	"Sun Is Standing"	3:30
3.	"Sunken"	12:34
4.	"Abcdelancey (Gimmie That Dickel)"	9:18
5.	"Samsara"	18:41
6.	"Hippy War Machine"	16:26
7.	"Dismal Falls"	2:54

== Personnel ==
Pelt

- Patrick Best – instruments
- Mike Gangloff – vocals, instruments
- Jack Rose – instruments

Production and additional personnel

- James Connell – djembe on "Hippy War Machine"
- Chris Davis – drums on "Hippy War Machine"
- Vicki Ellison – photography
- Fudd – recording on "Sunken" and "Abcdelancey (Gimme That Dickel)"
- Sarah Johnson – photography
- Beth Jones – djembe on "Hippy War Machine"
- Mark Miley – drums on "Hippy War Machine"
- Mike Pacello – djembe on "Hippy War Machine"
- Amy Shea – auto harp on "Hippy War Machine", bowed cymbal on "Dismal Falls", photography
