= Black Twig =

Black twig is a type of an apple

Black twig may refer to:

- Black Twig, Finnish musical band
- Black Twig Pickers, an Appalachian old-time band
