= Rival (disambiguation) =

A rivalry is the opposition between two competing parties (rivals). Someone's main rival is an archrival.

Rivalry, rival, The Rivals, or arch rival may also refer to:

== Film ==
- Rivals (1923 film), a German silent film by Harry Piel
- Rivals (1925 American film), an American silent film starring Oliver Hardy
- Rivals (1925 Polish film), a Polish silent film directed by Henryk Szaro
- The Rivals (1926 film), a Swedish silent comedy film directed by Gustaf Edgren
- The Rival (film), a 1956 Italian-French melodrama
- The Rivals (1964 film), a British second feature film
- Rivals (1972 film), an American film
- Rivals (1985 film), a Soviet Union film
- Rivals (2008 French film), a French film
- Rivals (2008 Spanish film), a Spanish comedy-sport film
- Rivalry (film), a 1953 Italian film
- The Stalking of Laurie Show or Rivals, a 2000 TV film
- The Rivals, a 1938 TV film starring Eric Portman

== Gaming ==
- Arch Rivals, a 1989 basketball arcade video game
- Marvel Rivals, a 2024 video game
- Sonic Rivals, a 2006 video game
- Need for Speed Rivals, a 2013 racing video game
- Rivalry, a 2015 sword fighting video game
- Rivals of Aether, a 2017 fighting video game
  - Rivals of Aether II, the 2024 direct sequel
- Command & Conquer: Rivals, a 2018 mobile phone game
- Rivals (Roblox), a 2024 shooter game

== Literature and theatre ==
- The Rivals (1664 play), a play by William Davenant
- The Rivals, a 1775 play by Richard Brinsley Sheridan
- Rivals!, a 1935 musical based on the play
- Rivals (novel), a 1988 novel by Jilly Cooper
- The Rival, a 1997 novel by Kristine Kathryn Rusch
- Rival (comics), a Reverse-Flash comic book villain

== Music ==
- The Rivals (band), an English punk band
- The Rivals, a one-off group formed for the song "2nd Best to None" by Benny Andersson and Björn Ulvaeus

=== Albums ===
- Rivals (Coal Chamber album), 2015
- Rivals (Kensington album), 2014
- The Rivalry (album), a 1998 album by Running Wild
- Rivals, a 2013 classical album by David Hansen
- A Rival, a 1997 album by Alannah Myles

=== Songs ===
- "Rival" (song), a 2011 song by Romeo Santos
- "Rivals" (song), a 2016 song by Usher
- "Rival", a 2000 song by Pearl Jam from Binaural
- "Rival", a Pokémon Pocket Monsters theme song

== Places ==
- The Rivals, the English name of Welsh mountain Yr Eifl
- Rivals, Kentucky, U.S.

== Ships ==
- Rival (sternwheeler), a steamboat
- USS Rival, the name of two U.S. Navy ships

== Television and radio ==
- "The Rival", an episode of The Amazing World of Gumball
- "The Rival" (Rev.), a 2010 television episode
- The Rivals (TV play) (1961)
- The Challenge: Rivals, season 21 of the MTV reality game show
- Popstars: The Rivals, a British talent show
- "Rivals" (Star Trek: Deep Space Nine), an episode of Star Trek: Deep Space Nine
- "Rivals", an episode of Frasier
- "The Rivals", an episode of The O.C.
- The Rivals, a 2011 BBC radio drama series with lead character Inspector Lestrade
- Rivals (TV series), a 2024 British TV adaptation of the 1988 Jilly Cooper novel Rivals
- "Rivalry", an episode of Code Lyoko: Evolution
- "Rivalries", an episode of Undergrads

== Other uses ==
- Rivalry (economics), a characteristic of consumption of goods
- Rivals.com, a sports recruiting website
- Aeros Rival, a Ukrainian competition paraglider
- Rival (consumer products company), an American company founded in 1932
- Rival (software company), an American software company founded in 2003
- The Rivals (painting), a 1931 painting by Diego Rivera

== See also ==
- Binocular rivalry
- College rivalry
- List of sports rivalries
- Monocular rivalry
- The Rivalry (disambiguation)
- Sibling rivalry
- Category:Business rivalries
- Category:Fiction about rivalry
- Category:Musical rivalries
- Category:Regional rivalries
- Category:Sports rivalries
