= Nikolaj Frobenius =

Norwegian novelist and screen writer (born 1965)

Nikolaj Frobenius (born 29 September 1965) is a Norwegian novelist and screen writer.

Frobenius was born in Oslo, but grew up at Rykkinn. He studied film writing and research at LCP, London. He has written several books and screenplays, including the screenplay for the classic Nordic film thriller Insomnia, which was adapted into a major Hollywood production in 2002. His international breakthrough as a novelist came with the novel Latours katalog (1996). His books have been translated into twenty-five languages, including English, French, Spanish, Italian, German, Russian and Danish. His novels have received critical acclaim both in Norway and internationally, and he has won several literary prizes for his writing. Nikolaj Frobenius is a former editor of the periodical Vinduet and worked as a commissioning editor for Norsk filmfond from 2005 to 2008. Frobenius has written several successful screenplays, including Dragonfly (2001). In 2011 he adapted his own novel, the semi-autobiographical Teori og praksis into the film Sønner av Norge (Sons of Norway). In 2018 he published the novel Notes from the Congo. The psychological thriller Swann Song was published by Gyldendal in 2021 and the novel Extermination 2023. He continues to write novels and scripts for film and television. He lives and writes in Oslo.

== Bibliography ==
- Virvl (1986, poems)
- Den unge Villiam Oxenstiernes lysende kjærlighet (1989)
- Helvetesfabel (1991)
- Latours katalog ("Latours valet")
- Insomnia (1997, screenplay)
- Den sjenerte pornografen
- Dragonfly (screenplay, with Marius Holst - 2001)
- Andre steder (2001)
- Det aller minste (2003)
- Teori og praksis (2004)
- En folkefiende (screen play re-adaption, 2005)
- Herlige nederlag: artikler og intervjuer om litteratur og film (2007)
- Jeg skal vise dere frykten (2008)
- "Sønner av Norge" (Sons of Norway. Screenplay. - 2011)
- Så høyt var du elsket (2011)
- "Pioner" (Screenplay - co-writer - 2012) (Pioneer)
- "Mørke grener" (2014) ("Dark branches")
- "Alle mine demoner" (2016)
- "Kongonotatene" (2018)
- "Svanesang" (2021)
- "Forsvinningen" (The Lørenskog Disappearance) (2022)
- "Utryddelsen" (2023)
