= Empty Bell Ringing in the Sky =

Studio album by Pelt
- Released: August 18, 1999
- Recorded: April 19, 1998–January 1, 1999
- Genre: Drone, experimental rock
- Length: 77:25
- Label: VHF
- Producer: Bill Kellum, Pelt

Pelt chronology
For Michael Hannas (1998)	Empty Bell Ringing in the Sky (1999)	Ayahuasca (2001)

Professional ratings
Review scores
Source	Rating
Allmusic	4.5/5 stars

Empty Bell Ringing in the Sky is the fifth studio album by the rock band Pelt. It was released in 1999 through VHF Records.

== Accolades ==
Publication	Country	Accolade	Year	Rank
Ned Raggett	United States	The Top 136 Albums of the Nineties	1999	134

== Track listing ==
All tracks are written by Pelt.

No.	Title	Length
1.	"Ghosts Are Never Forgiven"	10:13
2.	"Empty Bell Ringing in the Sky No. 2" (Part 1)

Side two
No.	Title	Length
1.	"Empty Bell Ringing in the Sky No. 2" (Part 2)

Side three
No.	Title	Length
1.	"Empty Bell Ringing in the Sky No. 5"	17:25

Side four
No.	Title	Length
1.	"Zyzzybaloubah" (Ghost Galaxies)	18:15

== Personnel ==
Pelt

- Patrick Best – instruments
- Mike Gangloff – vocals, instruments
- Jack Rose – instruments

Production and additional personnel

- Maya Hayuk – photography
- Bill Kellum – production
- Pelt – production
