= Brown Cyclopaedia =

Studio album by Pelt
- Released: 1995
- Recorded: Glass Hand, Richmond, Virginia
- Genre: Experimental rock
- Length: 75:21
- Label: Radioactive Rat

Pelt chronology
Brown Cyclopaedia (1995)	Burning/Filament/Rockets (1995)

Professional ratings
Review scores
Source	Rating
AllMusic	4/5 stars

Brown Cyclopaedia is the debut album of Pelt, released in 1995 through Radioactive Rat Records.

== Track listing ==
All tracks are written by Pelt.

Side one
No.	Title	Length
1.	"Anchored"	7:40
2.	"Green Flower"	9:58
3.	"Couldn't See It"	1:37

Side two
No.	Title	Length
1.	"Subversion of a Cat's Eye"	4:36
2.	"Secret Grudge Matches"	4:49
3.	"Penelope from a Plane"	2:30
4.	"Phantom Tick" (edit)	7:04

Side three
No.	Title	Length
1.	"Absolution"	10:39
2.	"Almighty"	6:00
3.	"4th in Paradise"	4:21

Side four
No.	Title	Length
1.	"Total Denigration"	3:18
2.	"Who Is the Third Who Walks Always Beside You?"	9:11
3.	"Speedy West Massaker"	1:51
4.	"Hugest"	1:54

== Personnel ==
Pelt

- Patrick Best – instruments
- Mike Gangloff – vocals, instruments
- Jack Rose – instruments

Production and additional personnel

- James Connell – instruments on "Who Is The Third Who Walks Always Beside You?", "Speedy West Massaker" and "Hugest"
- Mark Cornick – instruments
- Ron Curry – instruments on "4th in Paradise" and "Total Denigration"
- Paul Morabito – instruments on "Who Is The Third Who Walks Always Beside You?", "Speedy West Massaker" and "Hugest"
