= For Michael Hannas =

Compilation album by Pelt
- Released: 1998
- Recorded: January 25, 1997–February 22, 1998
- Genre: Drone, experimental rock
- Length: 62:28
- Label: VHF

Pelt chronology
Técheöd (1998)	For Michael Hannas (1998)	Empty Bell Ringing in the Sky (1999)

Professional ratings
Review scores
Source	Rating
Allmusic	3/5 stars

For Michael Hannas is a compilation album by Pelt, released in 1998 through VHF Records. It contains various unreleased recordings by the band.

== Track listing ==
All tracks are written by Pelt.

No.	Title	Recorded	Length
1.	"Twins Sisters"	2/17/98 at Coolidge's Home, Ivanhoe	2:29
2.	"Techeod"	1/9/98 at Patrick and Sarah's, 1/31/98 at Mike and Amy's	10:10
3.	"Mosquito"	1/31/98 at Mike and Amy's	0:35
4.	"Kif"	2/1/98 at Mike and Amy's	7:58
5.	"Other Particles"	1/31/98 at Mike and Amy's	6:03
6.	"Transposed Roads"	1/31/98 at Mike and Amy's	9:13
7.	"Pith"	1/31/98 at Mike and Amy's	1:36
8.	"Bring Me the Head"	1/9/98 at Patrick and Sarah's	2:29
9.	"Null"	2/22/98 at New House, Madison Heights	2:11
10.	"Goodwin's Ferry Sunrise"	1/25/97 at Mike and Amy's, 4/11/97 at Tokyo Rose, Charlottesville	19:44

== Personnel ==
Pelt

- Patrick Best – instruments
- Mike Gangloff – vocals, instruments
- Jack Rose – instruments

Production and additional personnel

- Beth Jones – drums on "Goodwin's Ferry Sunrise"
- Amy Shea – fiddle on "Techeod", "Bring Me the Head" and "Goodwin's Ferry Sunrise"
- Mick Simmons – tabla on "Goodwin's Ferry Sunrise"
- Coolidge Winesett – fiddle on "Twin Sisters"
