= Ayahuasca (Pelt album) =

Studio album by Pelt
- Released: June 12, 2001
- Recorded: March 20, 1999–February 4, 2001
- Genre: Drone, experimental rock
- Length: 133:42
- Label: VHF

Pelt chronology
| Empty Bell Ringing in the Sky (1999) | Ayahuasca (2001) | Pearls from the River (2003) |

Professional ratings
Review scores
| Source | Rating |
|---|---|
| AllMusic | 4/5 stars |

Ayahuasca is the sixth album by drone rock band Pelt. It was released on June 12, 2001, through VHF Records.

== Track listing ==
All tracks are written by Pelt.

| No. | Title | Length |
|---|---|---|
| 1. | "True Vine" | 16:42 |
| 2. | "Deer Head Apparition" | 26:57 |
| 3. | "The Cuckoo" | 6:06 |
| 4. | "Deep Sunny South" | 4:33 |
| 5. | "Raga Called John" (Part 1) | 12:10 |

Disc two
| No. | Title | Length |
|---|---|---|
| 1. | "The Dream of Leaping Sharks" | 21:06 |
| 2. | "Bear Head Apparition" | 10:48 |
| 3. | "Will You Pray for Me?" | 3:29 |
| 4. | "Raga Called John" (Part 2) | 25:39 |
| 5. | "Raga Called John" (Part 3) | 6:12 |

== Personnel ==
Pelt

- Patrick Best – vocals, guitar, tanpura, Tibetan Bowl, chord organ, concertina
- Mike Gangloff – vocals, banjo, esraj, hurdy-gurdy, zither, dolceola, tanpura
- Jack Rose – guitar, chord organ

Production and additional personnel

- Jason Bill – cymbal on "Raga Called John (Part 1)"
- Ian Nagoski – guitar on "Deep Sunny South", tanpura on "Raga Called John (Part 1)", vocals and fiddle on "Will You Pray for Me?"
