= Here We Go Then, You and I =

Here We Go Then, You And I

Studio album by Morten Abel
- Released: 11 October 1999
- Genre: Pop
- Label: Virgin
- Producer: Steve Lovell and Morten Abel

Morten Abel chronology
Snowboy (1997)	Here We Go Then, You And I (1999)	I'll Come Back And Love You Forever (2001)

Here We Go Then, You And I is a 1999 album by Norwegian pop artist Morten Abel. It was Abel's second CD as a solo artist. The album went straight to number one on the Norwegian album chart, and sold to double platinum. Among the singles released from the album were the songs "Be My Lover" and "Hard To Stay Awake".

== Production ==
Here We Go Then, You And I followed Abel's 1997 début album Snowboy, which he released after splitting up with his former band The September When. This first solo album was a relative disappointment after the success Abel had enjoyed with The September When. The album was recorded in England, in Lincolnshire, Brighton and London during the winter of 1998. Abel co-produced the album with Steve Lovell while the mixing was done by Lovell and Pete Jones. Later, two tracks were added in Stavanger, Norway. The title of the album is from T.S. Eliot's The Love Song of J. Alfred Prufrock, and appears as a line in the song "Be My Lover".

== Reception ==
The album was generally well received by reviewers; it received six out of six points from Anders Grønneberg in the newspaper Dagbladet. Grønneberg described the CD as one of his best musical experiences so far that year. He called the album Abel's best so far, including the work he had done previously with the band The September When. Grønneberg mentioned musical references such as 1970s disco, David Bowie and Van Morrison, while Abel managed to maintain his musical individuality. Espen A. Hansen, writing for Verdens Gang, was less impressed. Hansen found that Abel had made an album of generally decent quality, but was too afraid to take chances and try new things.

Here We Go Then, You And I went straight to number one on the official Norwegian album chart, where it stayed for four weeks. All together it remained in the Top 40 for 56 weeks – until 2001 – longer than any other of Abel's albums. It sold 147.000 records in Norway, earning double platinum status. Abel won the Norwegian Hit Award for best male artist in 2000. The album did not receive the Norwegian music award Spellemannprisen for best pop album that year, a decision that surprised many. It has been said that it was this album that confirmed Abel's position as Norway's "king of pop".

== Track listing ==
1. Hard to Stay Awake – 04:02
2. Tulipz – 03:59
3. Don't Forget to Dance – 03:40
4. Be My Lover – 04:58
5. The Man with No Shadow – 05:14
6. Doberman – 04:22
7. Let the Good Times Roll – 04:43
8. The Whistler – 04:51
9. Dad's Girl – 02:46
10. I Always Thought the World Was Made for Me – 05:32
11. Tulipz (remix) – 06:45

== Personnel ==
Abel played the guitar and bass on all tracks except "Don't Forget To Dance" and "Be My Lover". There were also various other musicians involved in the recording.

- Morten Abel – Vocals, various instruments
- Børge Fjordheim – Percussion
- Allan Skurtveit – Keyboard
- Inge Helland – Guitar
- Kjetil Netteland – Bass

== Singles ==
1. Tulipz – (August 1999)
2. Doberman – (November 1999)
3. Be My Lover – (January 2000)
4. Hard to Stay Awake – (June 2000)
