= Técheöd =

Studio album by Pelt
- Released: April 1, 1998
- Recorded: November 14, 1997–November 15, 1997 in Ivanhoe, Virginia; June 29, 1997 at Washington, D.C.
- Genre: Drone, experimental rock
- Length: 57:52
- Label: VHF

Pelt chronology
Max Meadows (1997)	Técheöd (1998)	For Michael Hannas (1998)

Professional ratings
Review scores
Source	Rating
AllMusic	4/5 stars
Pitchfork Media	(1.1/10)

Técheöd is the fourth studio album by drone rock band Pelt. It was released on April 1, 1998, through VHF Records.

== Track listing ==
All tracks are written by Pelt.

No.	Title	Length
1.	"New Delhi Blues"	13:59
2.	"Big Walker Mountain"	26:53
3.	"Mu Mesons"	17:00

== Personnel ==
Pelt

- Patrick Best – instruments, photography
- Mike Gangloff – vocals, instruments, photography
- Jack Rose – instruments

Production and additional personnel

- Mark Cornick – percussion on "New Delhi Blues"
- Bill Kellum – recording on "Big Walker Mountain Tunnel"
- Amy Shea – fiddle on "New Delhi Blues", photography
- Mick Simmons – tabla on "New Delhi Blues"
