= Burning/Filament/Rockets =

Studio album by Pelt
- Released: 1995
- Genre: Drone, experimental rock
- Length: 53:57
- Label: Econogold

Pelt chronology
Brown Cyclopaedia (1995)	Burning/Filament/Rockets (1995)	Max Meadows (1997)

Burning/Filament/Rockets is the second album by Pelt, released in 1995 through Econogold Records.

== Track listing ==
All tracks are written by Pelt.

No.	Title	Length
1.	"Ashram"	4:57
2.	"What Remains of Filament"	0:24
3.	"Shackleton: Incinerator Wheel"	7:48
4.	"Shackleton: Ice Floes"	6:00
5.	"Pineal Eye"	7:06
6.	"Charmed Circle"	6:06
7.	"Antipodes"	4:51
8.	"Ein Platz an der Sonne"	4:23
9.	"Totenmesse Von Steigleitung Sonne"	13:33
10.	"Gospel Midget"	6:54

== Personnel ==
Pelt

- Patrick Best – instruments
- Mike Gangloff – vocals, instruments
- Jack Rose – instruments
