= Morten Abel =

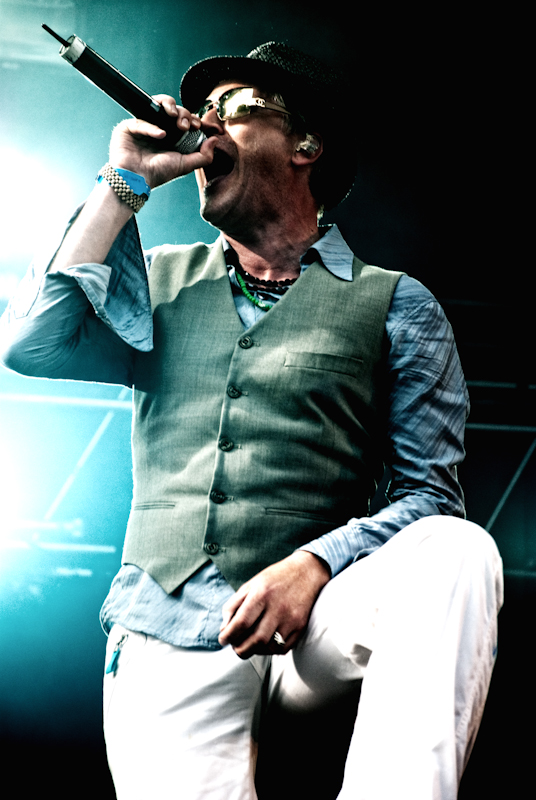
- Morten Abel at the Slottsfjell festival, July 2009

Background information
- Born: Morten Abel Knutsen; 15 October 1962 (age 63)
- Origin: Bodø, Norway
- Genres: Pop, Rock, Country rock, Country pop
- Instruments: Vocals, Guitar, Bass, Drums, Percussion, Hammond, Keyboard, Piano, Accordion, Harmonica
- Formerly of: Mods; The September When; Peltz
- Website: https://mortenabel.com/

Morten Abel Knutsen (born 15 October 1962), better known by his stage name Morten Abel is a Norwegian pop artist, and one of Norway's best-selling domestic artists.

== Career ==
Morten Abel was born and grew up near Bodø, but moved to Stavanger when he was 15 years old. There he became the lead singer of a band called Catrix, which soon changed their name to "Mods". They released two albums in Norwegian language in 1981 and 1982, and had a big hit with a song called "Tore Tang". A third album in English language was released in 1984.

After Mods split up, Abel released a solo single in 1985. Two years later he formed the band "The September When", which became very popular in Norway. The September When released four studio albums between 1989 and 1994. Two of their hits were "Bullet Me" and "Cries Like A Baby".

When The September When split in 1996, Abel formed a new band called "Peltz". They released one album. After Peltz, Abel started focusing on a solo career, and his first solo album Snowboy was released in 1997. Since then he has released a further four solo albums, which have all been very successful in Norway. Some of his biggest solo hits include "Tulipz", "Be My Lover", "Trendsetter" and "Birmingham Ho".

So far, Morten Abel has sold around 550,000 solo albums. The total album sales of all his projects is more than 1 million. Abel has also acted in two Norwegian movies, "Hodet over vannet" (1993) and "Alt For Egil" (2004).

In 2006, Morten Abel performed at the prestigious Nobel Peace Prize Concert in Oslo.

== Discography ==
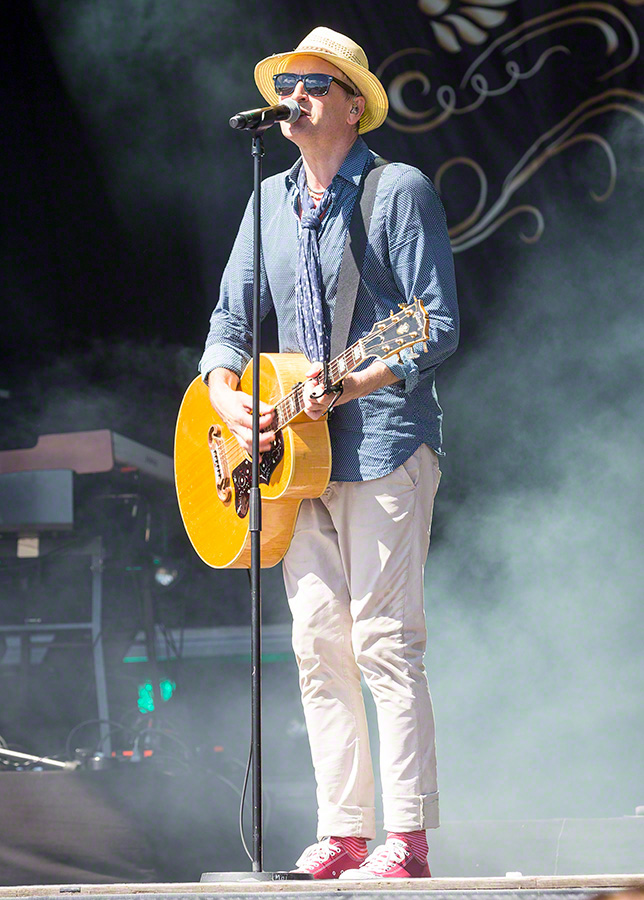
Abel at stage in 2016

=== Mods ===
- Revansj! (1981)
- Amerika (1982)
- Time Machine (1984)
- Originaler (1992) - CD re-issue set of two first albums
- Gje Meg Litt Merr: De Beste (2006) - Best of, CD+DVD

=== The September When ===
- The September When (1989)
- Mother I've Been Kissed (1991)
- One Eye Open (1993)
- HuggerMugger (1994)
- Prestige de la Norvége 89-96 (1996) - Best of
- The Best of TSW (2002) - Best of
- Judas Kiss (2008)

=== Peltz ===
- Coma (1996)

=== Solo album ===
- Snowboy (1997)
- Here We Go Then, You And I (1999)
- I'll Come Back And Love You Forever (2001)
- Being Everything, Knowing Nothing (2003)
- Morten Abel (2004) - Best of, 2CD
- Give Texas Back To Mexico (2005) - Collection, Sweden only.
- Some Of Us Will Make It (2006)
- I Fullt Alvor (2015)
- Evig Din (2018)
- Endelig Seier (2022)

=== Solo DVDs ===
- Being Everything, Knowing Nothing (2003)
- Live DVD (2004)

=== Solo singles ===
- "Be My Lover" (1999)
- "Doberman" (1999)
- "Hard to Stay Awake" (2000)
- "Tulipz" (2000)
- "I'll Come Back and Love You Forever" (2001)
- "You Are Beautiful" (2001)
- "Birmingham Ho" (2002)
- "Trendsetter" (2003)
- "Our Love Is Deep" (2003)
- "Big Brother" (2006)
- "Stars" (2006)
- "Annabelle" (2015)
- "Frøken Vilikke" (2015)

== Sexual assault allegation ==
In March 2007 during a radio broadcast on NRK P3, Abel and director Marius Holst was accused by artist and painter Marianne Aulie of attempting to drug and rape her during a party in the mid 1990s. Aulie and the interviewer Mina Hadjian were later criticized for the broadcast, while Abel and Holst denied the allegation through their lawyers.
