= Mirush =

Norwegian film

- Directed by: Marius Holst
- Written by: Harald Rosenløw Eeg; Lars Gudmestad
- Produced by: Gudny Hummelvoll
- Starring: Enrico Lo Verso; Nazif Muarremi
- Cinematography: John Andreas Andersen
- Edited by: Guido Notari
- Release date: 1 March 2007 (Norway)
- Running time: 100 minutes
- Country: Norway
- Language: Albanian / Norwegian
- Box office: $593,263

Mirush (Blodsbånd) is a 2007 Norwegian movie directed by Marius Holst. It tells the story of an Albanian boy, Mirush, who travels to Norway in search of his father. Italian actor Enrico Lo Verso plays the role of Bekim, Mirush's father.

The film was shown in a number of film festivals, winning the top award at the 56th International Film Festival Mannheim-Heidelberg in Germany. It also won the 24th FesTroia International Film Festival award.

== Plot ==
Mirush leaves Kosovo hoping to find his father in Norway, who abandoned the family when Mirush was very young. Now the father runs a restaurant in Oslo, but he is also in deep debt to the Albanian Mafia. Mirush starts to work in his father's restaurant without letting him know that he is his son.

== Cast ==
- Enrico Lo Verso as Bekim
- Nazif Muarremi as Mirush
- Glenn Andre Kaada as Frode
- Ramadan Huseini as Ismet
- Anna Bache-Wiig as Hannah
- Bajrush Mjaku as Vulkan
- Mirjana Karanović as Hava
- Michalis Koutsogiannakis as Kokken
- Fisnik Zekiri as Armend
