= Pelt (band) =

Drone music group

- Origin: Richmond, Virginia
- Genres: Drone music
- Years active: 1993–present
- Label: VHF
- Members: Mike Gangloff; Patrick Best; Mikel Dimmick; Nathan Bowles
- Past members: Jack Rose

Pelt is a drone music group formed in Richmond, Virginia in 1993.

== History ==
The band was originally formed in 1993 by violinist Mike Gangloff. The rest of the early lineup left on the verge of series of live dates, and in 1995 Gangloff recruited Patrick Best and guitarist Jack Rose, both of the band Ugly Head, to replace them. Inspirations came from artists in traditional American music and Indian raga along with others such as John Fahey and The Dead C.

After releasing Burning/Filament/Rockets in 1995 they released Brown Cyclopedia a year later on their own Radioactive Rat label. It was reissued by VHF Records, the label that the band stayed with until 2009. Max Meadows followed in 1997, the first of ten albums recorded for VHF, and featured homemade and modified instruments.

Current members Mikel Dimmick and Nathan Bowles joined the group in 2004 and 2006 respectively.

Rose left the group in 2006 to concentrate on his solo work. He died in December 2009.

The band has recorded in unusual locations to achieve particular sounds, including in caves and grain silos. Their 2012 album Effigy was recorded in former opera house.

== Musical style ==
The band make drone music using a variety of instruments. They began using electric guitars with a psychedelic rock element and influences such as La Monte Young and Sonic Youth, but have moved more towards drone and expanded to use instruments such as tabla, flute, esraj, tanpura, Tibetan bols, and lap steel guitar.

Best said of the band's relationship with traditional music: "Folk music has always used drone as a technique for adding depth to the music. Drone is just so fundamental to all music that is good."

Bowles described their music as "improvisational but not necessarily experimental", with the compositional process based around their choice of instruments for a particular piece, sometimes deciding in advance on "a specific scale, rhythm, or method of attack".

== Side projects ==
Gangloff also formed the Old-time band Black Twig Pickers, with which Rose also recorded, Best played in GHQ, and Rose recorded extensively as a solo artist both while a member of the band and after leaving. Best and Dimmick also performed as The Spiral Joy Band, which has also featured Karl Precoda of Dream Syndicate.

In 2003, the Rose-Gangloff-Best lineup of Pelt, Thurston Moore of Sonic Youth, and drummer Chris Corsano, under the name of The Din, were the backing band for Dredd Foole on his album The Whys of Fire. All of Dredd Foole's backing bands are known as The Din.

== Discography ==
- Brown Cyclopaedia (1995), Radioactive Rat
- Burning/Filament/Rockets (1995), Econogold
- Max Meadows (1997), VHF
- Empty Bell Ringing in the Sky (1999), VHF
- For Michael Hannas (2000), VHF
- Técheöd (2000), VHF
- Ayahuasca (2001), VHF
- Pearls from the River (2003), VHF
- Pelt (2005), VHF
- Skullfuck (2006), VHF
- Dauphin Elegies (2008), VHF
- A Stone For Angus MacLise (2009), VHF
- Effigy (2012), MIE Music
- The Eighth Day, The Eleventh Month, The Two-Thousand & Twelfth Year (2012)
