= 1996: Pust på meg! =

- Directed by: Eva Dahr; Oddvar Einarson; Mona J. Hoel; Marius Holst; Eva Isaksen
- Written by: Arne Berggren; Terje Holtet Larsen; Klaus Rifbjerg; Gunnar Staalesen; Marit Tusvik
- Starring: Krister Henriksson; Frits Helmuth; Stina Ekblad; Erik Hivju; Bjørn Sundquist
- Release date: 31 January 1997
- Running time: 106 minutes
- Country: Norway
- Language: Norwegian

1996: Pust på meg!, also known as simply Pust på meg, is a 1997 Norwegian drama film directed by Eva Dahr, Oddvar Einarson, Mona J. Hoel, Marius Holst and Eva Isaksen, and starring Krister Henriksson, Frits Helmuth, Stina Ekblad, Erik Hivju and Bjørn Sundquist. Four different scenes are being played out in an apartment in Oslo one day in April 1996.
