= Galleri Sand =

Galleri Sand is a Norwegian and New York City based art gallery, representing notable contemporary artists like Vebjørn Sand and Marianne Aulie. Founded in 1984 by the Norwegian Sand family. The artists of the gallery also consider themselves an artist collective.

The gallery has sold pieces to noted art collectors including Raymond J. Learsy.

== History ==
In the years prior to opening a permanent space, the artists who formed Galleri Sand worked with other galleries to exhibit their work. Their first exhibits were placed in sea huts that line the Norwegian coast on the islands of Hvaler. That pop-up, their first, featured depictions of the various villages that run closely to where the Sand family lived at that time. The gallery initially was an artist-run space on the east side of Oslo in the Grunerlokka area. After finding success they moved the gallery to the Frogner area. In 2007, Galleri Sand opened a space in the West Village neighborhood of New York City.

Galleri Sand closed its doors to the public in 2017 (they are now appointment-only) in an effort to shift their focus to more international work. From there the gallery began a series of pop-up tours and exhibited in over 60 cities, resulting in over 300,000 visitors.

== Notable Work ==
Galleri Sand has helped finance several notable public and private projects, many by the artist Vebjorn Sand:

- Leonardo Bridge Project, Château du clos lucé, 2016
- The Ice Bridge, Leonardo Bridge Project, COP15, Copenhagen, 2009
- The Ice Bridge, Leonardo Bridge Project, Greenland, 2009
- The Ice Bridge, Leonardo Bridge Project, The United Nations, NYC 2007-2008
- The Ice Bridge, Leonardo Bridge Project, Antarctica, 2006
- Scenes from the Second World War (Exhibited in New York)
- The Troll Castle in Oslo
