= Tennessee & Other Stories... =

Studio album by Hans Chew
- Released: 2010
- Genre: Americana
- Label: Three Lobed Recordings

Professional ratings
Review scores
Source	Rating
Uncut	4/5 stars

Tennessee & Other Stories... is the debut album from Hans Chew. It was initially released in vinyl format only as a 500 copy limited edition gatefold LP by Three Lobed Recordings in 2010. Uncut placed the album at number 21 on their list of the "Top 50 Albums of 2010", and the number 3 spot on their "20 Best Americana Albums of the Year". The album also garnered Hans Chew a nomination for the 2011 Uncut Music Award.

== Track listing ==
All music is composed by Hans Chew.

No.	Title	Length
1.	"Old Monteagle & Muscadine (Tennessee Part 1)"	2:58
2.	"Carry Me Bury Me (Tennessee Part 2)"	1:39
3.	"I Would There Was A Train (Tennessee Part 3)"	6:33
4.	"New Cypress Grove Boogie"	4:05
5.	"Long Time Man" (Written by Tim Rose, Arranged by Nick Cave)	6:07
6.	"Forever Again"	3:54
7.	"Queen Of The Damned Blues"	3:54
8.	"Magnet Moon"	4:40
9.	"Words & Music"	4:01
10.	"Only Son"	4:55
