= Hans Chew =

American pianist

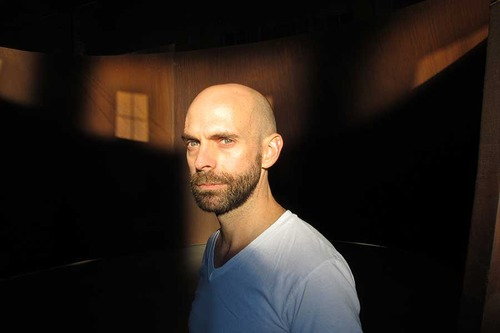
- Hans Chew in Brooklyn, New York

Background information
- Born: Hans-Harding Alexis Chew; November 4, 1975 (age 50)
- Genres: Rock & Roll, Americana, Piano Blues
- Occupation: Musician
- Instruments: Piano, Guitar, Drums
- Years active: 2007–present
- Labels: Three Lobed, Divide by Zero, At The Helm
- Members: Hans Chew; Dave Cavallo; Ryan Jewel
- Past members: Jesse Wallace; Ricky Ortiz
- Website: Official Website

Hans Chew (November 4, 1975) is an American pianist originally from Chattanooga, Tennessee, now based in New York City. He first gained recognition for his ragtime piano accompaniment to the late acoustic guitarist Jack Rose on his solo albums, The Black Dirt Sessions and Luck in the Valley. Chew is also an original member of the psychedelic/country outfit D. Charles Speer & the Helix.

In 2010, Hans Chew released his debut solo album Tennessee & Other Stories... in limited edition vinyl format. The album was heralded by British rock magazine Uncut as one of Best Albums of 2010. Uncut also nominated Hans Chew for their highest honor, the Uncut Music Award, whose previous winners include Fleet Foxes, Paul Weller and P.J. Harvey.

== Discography ==
=== Albums ===
- Open Sea (2017, At the Helm)
- Unknown Sire (2016, Divide By Zero)
- Life & Love (2014, At The Helm)
- Tennessee & Other Stories... (2010, Three Lobed Recordings)

=== Singles ===
- "Mercy" (2012, Self-Released)
- "New Cypress Grove Boogie b/w Forever Again" (2010, Three Lobed Recordings)

=== Compilations ===
- Freedom of the Press, Strange Ecology (2018)
- Honest Strings: A Tribute to Jack Rose, The Heart is Deceitful (2010)

=== Other ===
- One Eleven Heavy, Everything's Better (2018)
- Endless Boogie, Vibe Killer (2017)
- Steve Gunn, Eyes On The Lines (2016)
- Hiss Golden Messenger, Poor Moon (2011)
- D. Charles Speer & the Helix, Leaving the Commonwealth (2011)
- Chris Forsyth, Paranoid Cat (2011)
- Jack Rose with D. Charles Speer & the Helix, Ragged & Right (2010)
- Jack Rose, Luck in the Valley (2010)
- D. Charles Speer & the Helix, Distillation (2009)
- D. Charles Speer & the Helix, In Madagascar/Bar-Abbas Blues (2008)
- The Lost Crusaders, Have You Heard About The World? (2008)
- D. Charles Speer & the Helix, After Hours (2008)
- D. Charles Speer & the Helix, Past or Beyond/Canaanite Builder (2007)
