= Cross My Heart and Hope to Die (film) =

- Directed by: Marius Holst
- Written by: Lars Saabye Christensen; Marius Holst
- Produced by: Petter J. Borgli
- Starring: Martin Dahl Garfalk
- Cinematography: Philip Øgaard
- Release date: 1994
- Running time: 96 minutes
- Country: Norway
- Language: Norwegian

Cross my Heart and Hope to Die (Norwegian: Ti kniver i hjertet, lit. 'Ten Knives in the Heart') is a 1994 Norwegian film directed by Marius Holst. It is loosely based on Lars Saabye Christensen's novel Gutten som ville være en av gutta.

The film was selected as the Norwegian entry for the Best Foreign Language Film at the 67th Academy Awards, but was not accepted as a nominee.

== Plot ==
In early 1960s Oslo, Otto wants to be one of the guys, but struggles to live up to the tough ideals prevailing in his circle of friends. While everyone else goes on vacation, Otto has to stay home, as the moving company where his father works is busiest during the summer. One day, he meets the mysterious Frank, and what promised to be a long, boring summer quickly turns into the exact opposite.

== Cast ==
- Martin Dahl Garfalk as Otto
- Trond Halbo as Johnny
- Jan Devo Kornstad as Frank
- Kjersti Holmen as Mother
- Reidar Sørensen as Father
- Bjørn Sundquist as Bulken
- Bjørn Floberg as Wiik
- Gisken Armand as Sager
- Ingar Helge Gimle as Gregers
- Per Oscarsson as Piano tuner
- Karl Bomann-Larsen as Referee
- Adolf Bjerke as School principal
- Bernhard Ramstad as Villa owner
- Trond Brænne as Mover
- Knut Haugmark as Mover
- Bjørn Jenseg as Mover
- Pia Tellefsen as Ane's mother
- Lasse Lindtner as Ane's father
- Gard B. Eidsvold as the Voice
- Nina Helene Andersen as Ane

== Awards ==
The film was nominated to the Golden Bear at the 45th Berlin International Film Festival.

== See also ==
- List of submissions to the 67th Academy Awards for Best Foreign Language Film
- List of Norwegian submissions for the Academy Award for Best Foreign Language Film
