= Mina Hadjian =

Norwegian-Iranian radio host

Mina Helen Hadjian (Persian: مینا حاجیان; born 1975) is a Norwegian-Iranian talk-show host and radio personality. Although widely successful, her shows were known for raising controversial topics, and her work-ethics have been widely debated.

== Early life and education ==
Born in Teheran, Hadjian fled Iran with her family in 1979 after the islamic revolution, and was raised first in London and later in Norway when her family settled on Kråkerøy in Fredrikstad. She has studied Market Economics at the BI Norwegian Business School in Oslo and Marketing Communications, French and Italian at the University of Greenwich in London.

== Radio career ==
Hadjian began her career as a producer and director at MTV Europe in London. She has also worked with the French news network Channel 24, as well as Norwegian radio station NRJ. Hadjian made her television debut on Monday, 16 April 2007 with the show Unseen: Mina (Norwegian: Usett: Mina). The program received the lowest possible rating of 1 by newspaper VG, and the online edition VG.nett wrote on 17 April 2007 that Mina would "tattoo the 1-rating on her backside," in an attempt to copy Ari Behn's alleged tattoo of 6-rating (the best) on his shoulder. She hosted the controversial radio show Mina on NRK P3 until 2007 when she was forced out following a string of controversies. During the autumn of 2008, Hadjian launched her new website-based venture, in which she would act as both a radio-host and blogger. It consisted of weekly broadcasts where she interviewed celebrities. Hadjian was also a host on the television talk show Studio 5, which aired on the channel FEM from 2008 to 2010.

=== Controversies ===
In November 2006, a commercial was made for her show on NRK in which she stated, "Hi, this is Veronica Orderud, and I listen to Mina every day. If you do not do the same, I will kill you." Orderud was convicted of a notorious triple-murder in 2000, and the ad was considered to be vulgar and tasteless.

In March 2007, she interviewed artist and painter Marianne Aulie for a broadcast at NRK P3 during which Aulie accused artist Morten Abel and director Marius Holst of attempting to drug and rape her during a party in the mid 1990s. The interview left Hadjian emotional and moved to tears during the broadcast. Aulie and Hadjian were later criticized for the broadcast, while Abel and Holst denied the allegation through their lawyers. NRK journalist Jahn Otto Johansen and other celebrities responded negatively, with Johansen stating "She's destroying NRK." NRK P3 producer Tone Donald defended Hadjian and stated that "She runs with real-time radio, where she explains how she feels, like today. I wish that Mina can continue to express her feelings."

On 17 October 2007, it was announced that she had been removed by NRK P3. The background for her removal was an incident that took place during the airing of her talk-show Mina where the staff experienced technical difficulties. Hadjian responded by profanely scolding her staff and producers live on-air. The network subsequently cancelled all of her remaining shows, and filled the air-time with a "Night-temp". Shortly after, the network publicly announced that her contract had been terminated.
