= Mods (band) =

Norwegian rock band

Mods was a Norwegian rock band formed in Stavanger in 1980. The band recorded their first album Revansj! in 1981. The original members were vocalist Morten Abel, guitarist Runar Bjålid, guitarist Kurt Øyvind Olsen, bassist Torkild Viig, keyboardist Helge Hummervoll and drummer Leif Arne Bergvin Nilsen. After the first album, Bjålid and Olsen left the band and were replaced by Tor Øyvind Syvertsen. The second album Amerika was released in 1982. They recorded their last album, Time Machine, in 1984. They played some reunion concerts in 1990 in the Stavanger area. Morten Abel has on several occasions dismissed the band and their songs. Nevertheless, they are considered legends, especially in their home county Rogaland. Drummer Leif Nilsen later formed Leif & Kompisane, they sometimes play Mods songs live.

On 30 June 2012 Mods played at a very successful and well attended concert at the Viking Stavanger Football Stadium, to rapturous applause.

Abel, Hummervoll and Syvertsen later formed the band The September When in 1987, and Abel eventually went on to become a very successful solo artist in Norway.

In 1992, a CD re-issue set of two first Mods albums was released with the title Originaler. A "Best of" CD/DVD was released in 2006.

== Members ==
- Morten Abel - vocals, guitar, accordion (1980–84)
- Torkild Viig - bass (1980–84)
- Helge Hummervoll - keyboards (1980–83)
- Leif Arne Bergvin Nilsen - drums (1980–83)
- Kurt Øyvind Olsen - guitar (1980–82)
- Runar Bjaalid - guitar (1980–82)
- Tor Øyvind Syvertsen - guitar (1981–84)
- Geir Samsonsen - (1984)
- Craig Whitson - (1984)

== Discography ==
=== Albums ===
- 1981: Revansj!
- 1982: Amerika
- 1984: Time Machine

=== Live ===
- 2012: Live Viking Stadion 9. juni (Reached #3 in Norwegian Albums Chart)

=== Compilations ===
- 1992: Originaler - CD re-issue set of two first albums
- 2006: Gje Meg Litt Merr: De Beste - Best of, CD+DVD
