= Dragonfly (2001 film) =

2001 Norwegian drama film by Marius Holst

- Directed by: Marius Holst
- Screenplay by: Nikolaj Frobenius
- Based on: Natt Til Mørk Morgen by Ingvar Ambjørnsen
- Starring: Kim Bodnia; Mikael Persbrandt; Maria Bonnevie
- Music by: Magne Furuholmen; Kjetil Bjerkestrand
- Release date: September 2001
- Running time: 111 min.
- Country: Norway
- Language: Norwegian

Dragonfly (Norwegian: Øyenstikker) is a 2001 Norwegian drama film directed by Marius Holst, starring Kim Bodnia, Mikael Persbrandt and Maria Bonnevie. It is based on the short story "Natt Til Mørk Morgen" by Ingvar Ambjørnsen.

== Synopsis ==
A couple moves out on the country to try to leave their past behind, but the past catches up with them.
