= Marianne Aulie =

Norwegian artist (born 1971)

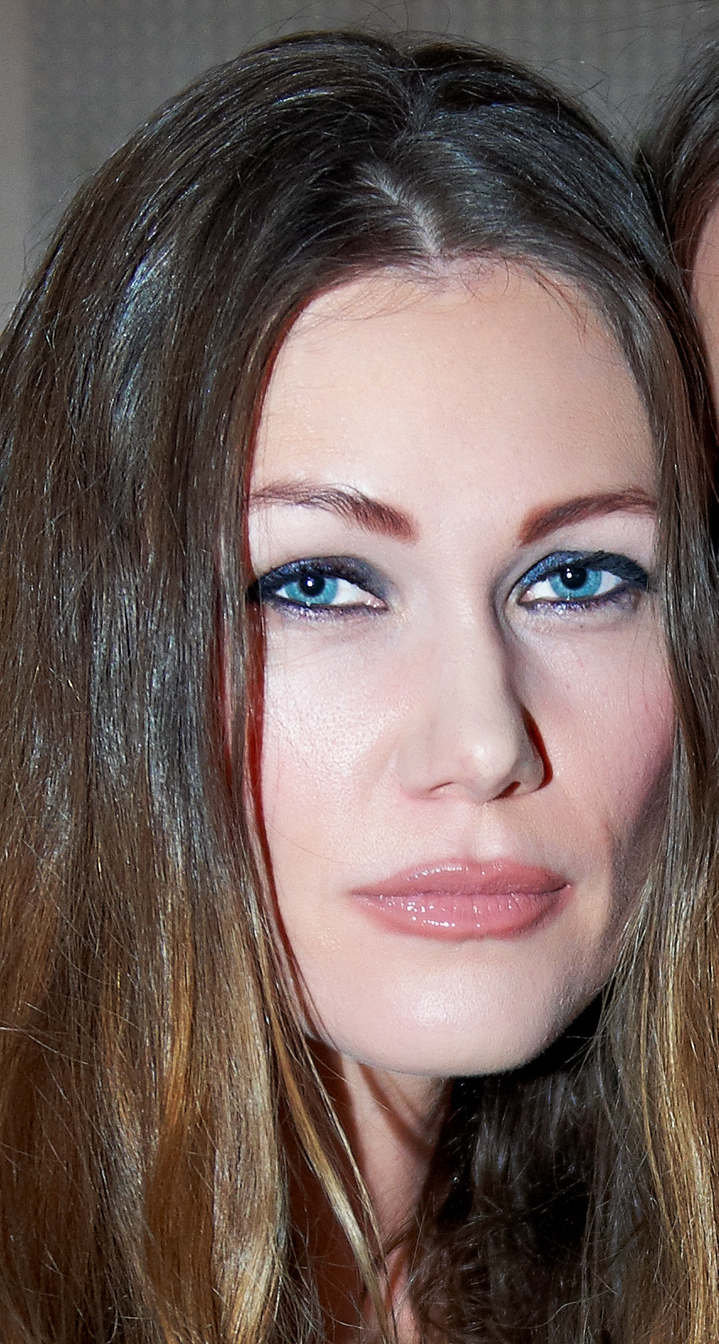
- Marianne Aulie
- Born: Marianne Bengtson Aulie; 23 October 1971
- Occupations: Painter; performance artist; designer
- Years active: 2001–present
- Spouse: Aune Sand

Marianne Aulie (born 23 October 1971, in Lørenskog) is a Norwegian painter and former model. She is a Norwegian contemporary artist, primarily known for painting and performance art. Aulie's large, colorful and expressive paintings explore the neo expressionist, action paint and neo pop art movements. Aulie is also known for her controversial performance art and guerilla marketing tactics to draw attention to her work, often employing nudity and dramatic gestures to do so.

Aulie is often noted for her success as a woman in the male-dominated art scene in Norway. In 2018, she placed 11th in net income in a list of the country's most profiled visual artists, the highest ranking for a woman.

== Early life and career ==
Aulie grew up in Lørenskog, in Greater Oslo, Norway. In the 1990s, she met the twin of Norwegian artist Vebjørn Sand, Aune Sand. After they met they travelled to Cairo, Egypt together where Sand made his debut feature film Dis. After helping Sand make the film and with his encouragement, Aulie returned to Norway to pursue her ambitions in art.

In Norway Aulie, pregnant with her first child, juggled three odd jobs while she applied for the Bergen Academy of Art & Design. After nearly being admitted twice in a row, Aulie decided to try and sell her paintings rather than continue to pursue a professional education. Of this time she said:

"When I was so close to the goal and not yet admitted to the Academy, I decided that I must show my child that I am strong enough to support us. I gave myself two or three years to pursue art. I had an easel in the corner of Galleri Sand at Grünerløkka. Vebjørn and Aune's big brother, Håvard, sold pictures from the gallery to companies around Norway. One day he brought my pictures too. When a business bought all 10 of my pictures, I realized: I could live off my art."

== Galleri Sand in New York ==
In 2008, Vebjørn Sand, together with his twin Aune Sand and Marianne Aulie, opened Galleri Sand in New York City to work there full-time and ultimately showcase their work. On opening night in October 2009 they sold paintings for over 3,700,000 kroner.

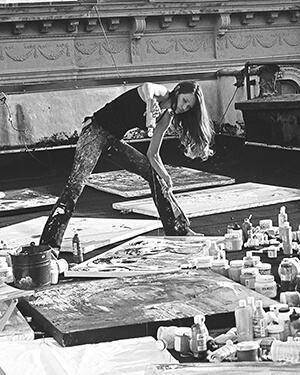
Aulie working at her outdoor studio in New York City.

In 2010, Galleri Sand was hired to open Allkopi concept stores for 1 million NOK. Allkopi, Norway's largest graphic chain and a traditionally business to business company, was looking to break into the consumer market at the time. Given Galleri Sand's creative reputation, they were contracted to help build brand awareness for Allkopi with the Norwegian public. As part of the partnership Allkopi also bought the rights to print graphics based on Aulie paintings, and images based on Aune Sand's films onto various materials from aluminum to glass and traditional print.

To promote the partnership, Allkopi CEO Christian Paulsen "bought" a pair of Aulie's underwear as part of the deal. In a publicized gesture, Aulie pasted her panties onto a picture and swung a paintbrush over them to symbolically establish art for the partnership. Of the move Aulie said, "The act of handing over my underwear is a symbolic acton. It's performance art combined with painting. It's about expressing the person I am. A symbol for being a strong and free woman."

== "Triumph of the Optimist" and "Narrespill" ==
Aulie's trademark series of paintings are "Triumph of the Optimist" and "Narrespill". The paintings feature clown-like figures as the focus. Of the figures Aulie said, "These are good creatures. Beings that want good. They are naive, but very kind. So the 'Triumph of the Optimist' is all about building each other up,"

Aulie summarized the ultimate purpose of her trademark work with: "We have to see each other and those who are unseen. And together perform the victory dance of the optimists. We have to separate from the cynicism, egoism, and materialism that we see in our society. We believe in the triumph of kindness, that to be good and tender is a victory."

== Clothing Line ==
In 2010, Aulie met New York fashion designer Cody Ross, of Priestess NYC, a fashion collection featured in Vogue, Harper's Bazaar and i:D, and they collaborated to design a clothing line based on Aulie's art. Ross, who owns a townhouse steps from Galleri Sand, first met Aulie when he stopped by to see her exhibition.

Priestess NYC, a favorite of supermodel Tyra Banks, artist Bjørk and actress Juliette Lewis, was one of the hottest fashion brands in 2010. Ross was constantly pushing the envelope and his collaboration with Aulie was no different. He said of Aulie: "She's great. She is the definition of "yumminess". She is avant-garde and abstract. She is an extreme talent and still an emerging star. I dig her."

In September 2010, the pair debuted the collection alongside Aulie's original paintings in a show titled "Clowns, Chaos & Order" at Galleri Sand in NYC. Ross described the show for Paper magazine: "Phantasmagoric, subversive, super-cool fashion meets abstract art, a directional fashion/art project that leverages surrealism, absurdism, shock-and-awe, technology and rigorous construction."

== Performance Art and Controversy ==
Channeling the "Summer of Love" spirit of the 1960s, Aulie has always embraced nudity and physical symbolism in her artwork. A career performance artist, she's promoted her work by swimming naked out to sea with her paintings, splashing her work with champagne as part of the process, and burning her paintings.

In 2007, Aulie caused a national stir when she took out a massive ad in the Norwegian publication Aftenposen's cultural section that consisted entirely of a photograph of her bare buttocks. The ad, four full columns in length and carefully crafted to get the attention of the artistic authority, also had the words, "Dear Minister of Culture, we will meet under a full moon." After the editors of the paper realized what had happened, they rushed to stop it. Aftenposen editor Ola Bernhus defended the paper saying, "We simply think that her buttocks over four columns of the cultural section's first page were more than we should allow, even though we have allowed the same body part in smaller a format earlier. Now the limit [has been] reached." Aulie believed the ad being cut short was simply yet another example of an artist being censored.

In March 2007 during a radio broadcast on NRK P3, Aulie accused artist Morten Abel and director Marius Holst of attempting to drug and rape her during a party in the mid 1990s. Aulie and the interviewer Mina Hadjian were later criticized for the broadcast, while Abel and Holst denied the allegation through their lawyers.

== Personal life ==
Aulie lives in the West Village neighborhood of New York City with her husband Aune Sand and their three daughters, Alba, Malove and Ava. Aulie often uses their home as her art studio and showcases her work at Galleri Sand in West Village, NYC.
