= Pelt (album) =

Studio album by Pelt
- Released: July 19, 2005
- Recorded: December 2004
- Genre: Drone, experimental rock
- Length: 61:47
- Label: VHF

Pelt chronology
Pearls from the River (2003)	Pelt (2005)	Skullfuck/Bestio Tergum Degero (2006)

Professional ratings
Review scores
Source	Rating
Allmusic	4.5/5 stars

Pelt is the eighth studio album by the drone rock band Pelt. It was released on July 19, 2005 through VHF Records.

== Track listing ==
All tracks are written by Pelt.

No.	Title	Length
1.	"[untitled]"	14:39
2.	"[untitled]"	29:56
3.	"[untitled]"	13:27
4.	"[untitled]"	3:45

== Personnel ==
Pelt

- Patrick Best – instruments
- Mikel Dimmick – instruments
- Mike Gangloff – vocals, instruments
- Jack Rose – instruments
