= Pelte (disambiguation) =

A pelte is a light shield used by ancient Greek peltasts.

Pelte may also refer to :

- Peltae, an ancient city and Catholic titular see
- Pelte, a sweet made in Aksaray, Turkey
- Lucy Pelte (died 1900), first wife of British lawyer W. H. Lionel Cox

== See also ==
- Pelt (disambiguation)
