= Peltz =

Peltz is a German and Ashkenazi Jewish surname. Notable people with the surname include:

- Dietrich Peltz (1914–2001), German Luftwaffe bomber pilot and general of the Wehrmacht
- John Peltz (1861–1906), American professional baseball player
- Mary Ellis Peltz (1890-1981) American opera critic, and founding editor of Opera News
- Nelson Peltz (born 1942), American businessman
- Nicola Peltz (born 1995), American actress
- Perri Peltz (born 1961), American television journalist
- Peter Peltz (1915–2001), American artist
- Will Peltz (born 1986), American actor

== See also ==
- Pelts
