= The Rivalry =

The Rivalry may refer to the following:

== Sports ==
- Johns Hopkins–Maryland lacrosse rivalry, between the Johns Hopkins Blue Jays and the Maryland Terrapins lacrosse teams
- Calvin–Hope men's basketball rivalry, between the Calvin College Knights and the Hope College Flying Dutch basketball teams
- The Rivalry (Lafayette–Lehigh), American college football between Lafayette College and Lehigh University
- Oxford–Cambridge rivalry, competition between the University of Oxford and the University of Cambridge
- Red Sox–Yankees rivalry, between the Boston Red Sox and New York Yankees
- Michigan–Ohio State football rivalry, between the University of Michigan and Ohio State University
- Carolina–Duke rivalry, between the University of North Carolina and Duke University
- Cowboys–Washington rivalry, between the Dallas Cowboys and Washington Commanders

== Other uses ==
- The Rivalry (album), by German band Running Wild
- The Rivalry (TV series), a 2022 Thai television drama

== See also ==
- Rivalry
- Category:Sports rivalries
