= The September When =

Norwegian musical group

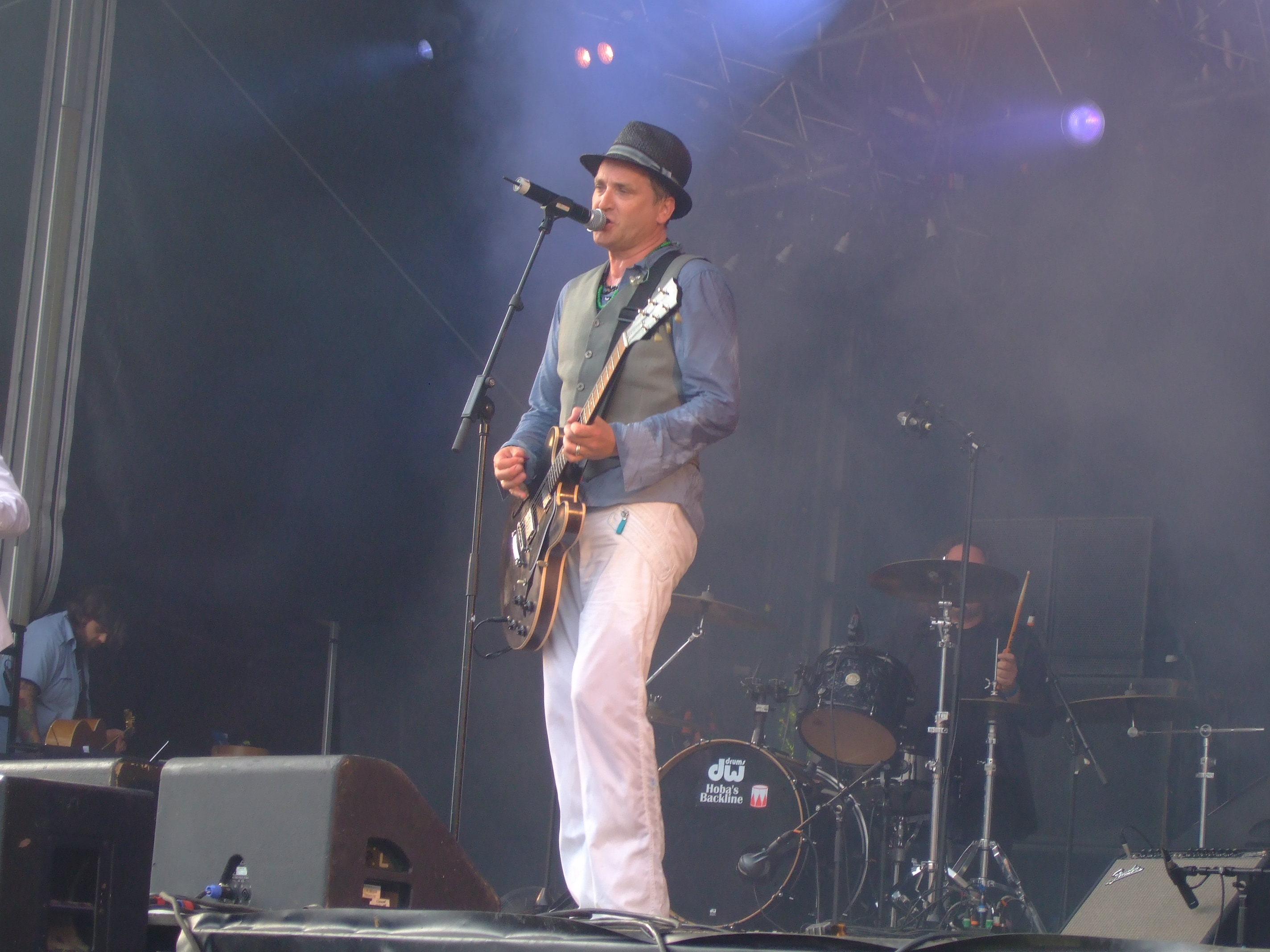

Background information
- Origin: Stavanger, Norway
- Genres: Pop, rock
- Years active: 1987–1996, 2008–present
- Members: Morten Abel; Morten Mølster; Gulleiv Wee; Stene Osmundsen; Helge Hummervoll
- Past members: Tor Øyvind Syvertsen; Torkild Viig
- Website: www.theseptemberwhen.no

The September When is a Norwegian rock band.

== History ==
The band was formed in Stavanger in 1987, by vocalist Morten Abel, guitarist Tor Øyvind Syvertsen and keyboardist Helge Hummervoll, all former members of the band Mods. They signed a recording contract with Warner Music in Norway, and released their self-titled debut album in 1989. The band line-up was broadened by the addition of bassist Gulleiv Wee and drummer Stene Osmundsen before the following tour. Syvertsen left the band the following year, and Morten Mølster took his place.

The new line-up released their break-through album Mother I've Been Kissed in 1991. In 1993, they released the album One Eye Open, which contains the band's highest-charting Norwegian hit, "Can I Trust You"; it peaked at number two on the VG-lista chart the same year. After releasing one more album, HuggerMugger in 1994, the September When split up in 1996. The same year they released the compilation Absolute The September When – Prestige de la Norvège 1989–96. Another compilation, The Best Of TSW, got released in 2002 and contains remastered songs.

According to the Morten Abel website, The September When reunited for a show on August 28, 2008, in Stavanger, Norway. The band returned with a fifth studio album "Judas Kiss" on December 5, 2008. Guitarist Morten Mølster died on January 14, 2013.

== Band members ==
=== Last line-up ===
- Morten Abel – vocals, acoustic guitar, electric guitar, harmonica (1987–1996)
- Morten Mølster – electric guitar (1990–1996)
- Torkild Viig – bass (1994–1996)
- Stene Osmundsen – drums and percussion (1990–1996)
- Helge Hummervoll – keyboards (1987–1996)

=== Former members ===
- Tor Øyvind Syvertsen – electric guitar (1987–1990)
- Gulleiv Wee – bass (1990–1994)

== Discography ==
=== Albums ===
- The September When (1989)
- Mother I've Been Kissed (1991)
- One Eye Open (1993)
- HuggerMugger (1994)
- Judas Kiss (2008)

=== EPs ===
- Mortal (1989)
- Bullet Me (1991)
- Mama Won't Tell You No Lie (1991)
- Roundabout... Now (1991)
- Cries Like A Baby (1994)
- Sometimes Serious (1994)
- I Can Take It (1994)
- Daydreaming (1996)

=== Compilations ===
- Absolute The September When – Prestige de la Norvège 1989–96 (1996)
- The Best Of TSW (2002)
