= Rivalry (video game) =

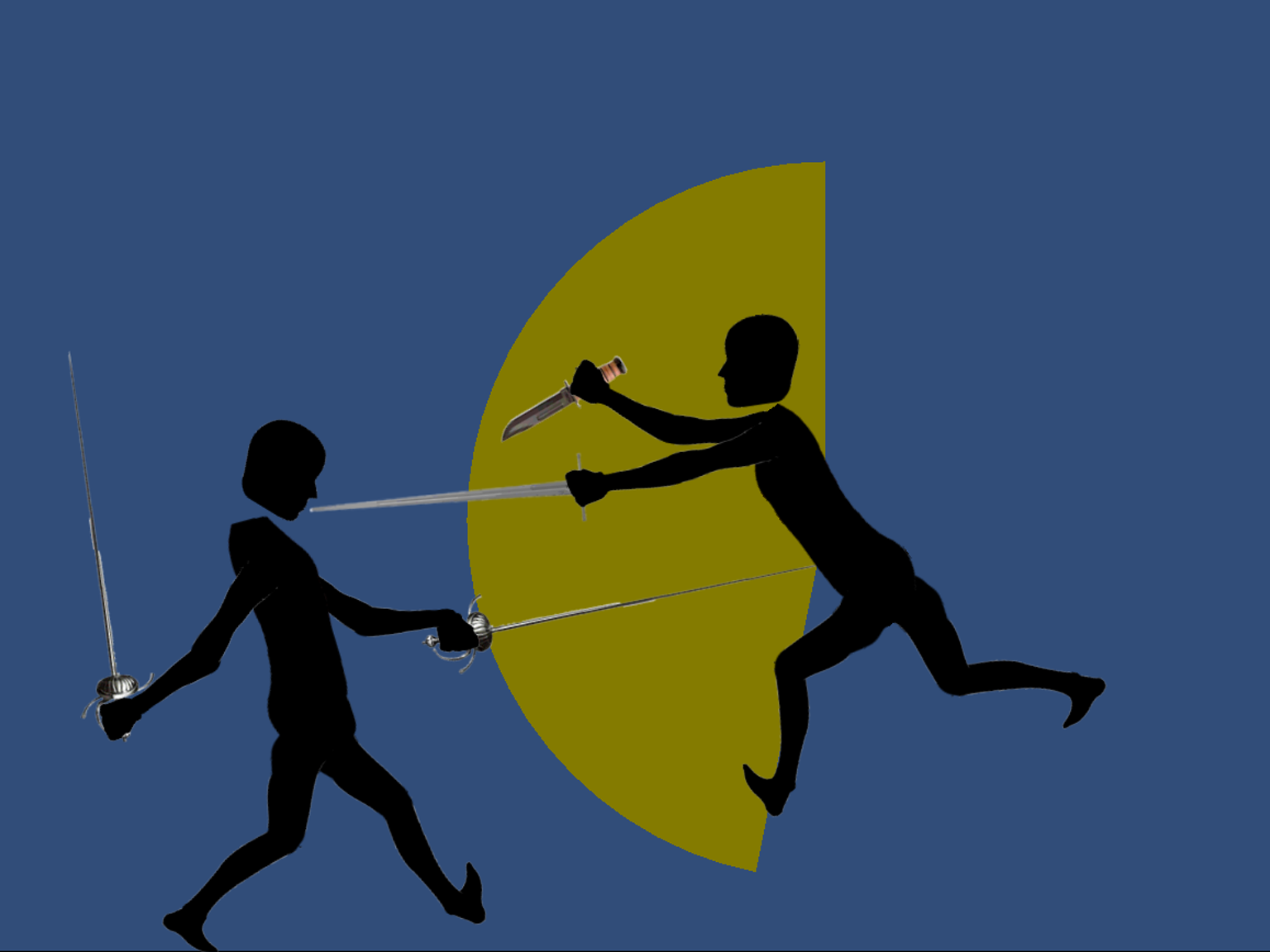
- A screenshot of the game's main fight screen
- Developer: Kew McParlane
- Publisher: My64K
- Engine: Unity
- Platforms: Windows, MacOS, Linux
- Release: WW: 1 November 2015 (itch.io); WW: 22 January 2016 (Steam Early Access)
- Genres: Fighting, Simulation
- Mode: Multiplayer

Rivalry is an upcoming ragdoll-based sword-fighting hotseat multiplayer game created by Kew McParlane. The game was released into Steam Early Access in January 2016 after being previewed as a WebGL game at PAX Australia 2015.

== Background ==
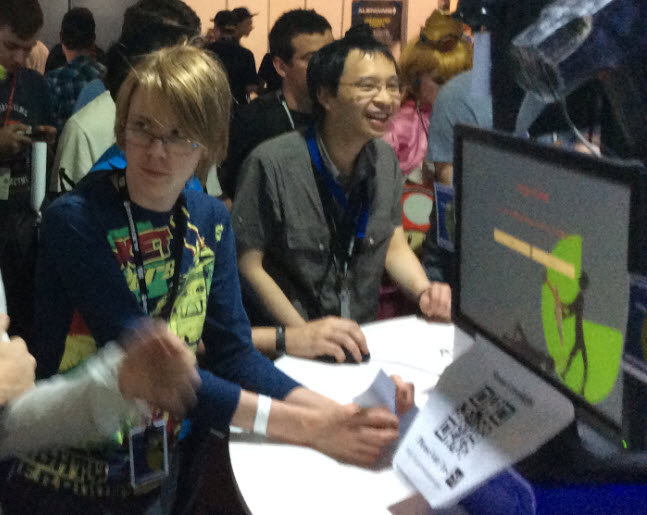
Creator of Rivalry, Kew McParlane, in November 2015 at PAX Australia

Rivalry was created by Kew McParlane and launched on 1 November 2015 at PAX Australia. Rivalry was a surprise hit of the show.

Kew came up with the idea of the game when he was a 12 year old, leading him to build a prototype using Little Big Planet. He took the idea to his father, who encouraged Kew by teaching him how to program. He then ran a successful Kickstarter to raise $2000 to get himself an Indie Developer stand at PAX 2015 in Melbourne, Australia.

== Gameplay and reception ==
In Rivalry, two players take turns at moving their ragdoll character’s limbs and weapons until one is victorious. While the beginning stages of each game captures the strategic essence of swordplay, as damage and limbs are taken, the endgame turns rather Pythonesque.

Rivalry's Steam Greenlight campaign launched a few days before PAX Australia 2015, and received mostly negative comments due to the primitive graphics of the game. During and after PAX, Rivalry began to receive almost exclusively positive comments from people who had attended PAX and experienced the game first-hand.

The game was green-lit by Steam on 16 December 2015.

Rivalry was released under Steam Early Access on 22 January 2016. It gained some popularity amongst gamers when Kim Richards from The Yogscast published two playthrough videos on the 16th and 19th of March 2016.

On 14 June 2016, Kew was interviewed by ABC TV's Good Game about Rivalry and his development experience.

== Development ==
The game is currently in alpha development and many more features, including online multiplayer, are planned before the game's full release.
