= Marius Holst =

Norwegian filmmaker (born 1965)

- Born: 15 January 1965 (age 61); Oslo, Norway
- Occupation: Film director
- Years active: 1990–

Marius Holst (born 15 January 1965) is a Norwegian filmmaker, a producer and a screenwriter.

== Education ==
Holst studied at the London International Film School. In 1990, his diploma film was nominated for the Amanda Award for Best Short Film, and for the Student Academy Awards and won the BBC Drama Award Grand Prix Potier.

== Career ==
In 1994 his first feature film Cross My Heart and Hope to Die was a box-office success in Norway, and became an international festival hit, winning the Prix de Montreal at the Montreal World Film Festival and the Blue Angel Award at the 45th Berlin International Film Festival.

Marius Holst is a co-founder and owner of the production company 4 ½, along with fellow director Pål Sletaune and producers Turid Øversveen and Håkon Øverås. Established in 1998, the company produces both feature films and commercials.

== Sexual assault allegation ==
In March 2007 during a radio broadcast on NRK P3, Holst and artist Morten Abel was accused by artist and painter Marianne Aulie of attempting to drug and rape her during a party in the mid 1990s. Aulie and the interviewer Mina Hadjian were later criticized for the broadcast, while Holst and Abel denied the allegation through their lawyers.

== Filmography ==
- 1990: Visiting Hours (Besøkstid)
- 1994: Cross my Heart and Hope to Die (Ti kniver i hjertet)
- 1996: Scent of Man (Lukten av mann)
- 1996: 1996: Pust på meg!
- 2001: Dragonfly (Øyenstikker)
- 2005: Bastard (Kjøter)
- 2006: Mirush (Blodsbånd)
- 2010: King of Devil's Island (Kongen av Bastøy)
- 2018: Mordene i Kongo
