= Van Pelt =

Van Pelt is a Dutch toponymic surname meaning "from Pelt". Pelt is a region in Belgian Limburg including the modern municipality of Overpelt, It could also refer to the neighboring Peel, Netherlands. People with this surname include:

- Alex Van Pelt (born 1970), American football quarterback and coach
- Alison Van Pelt (born 1963), American painter
- Brad Van Pelt (1951–2009), American football linebacker
- Bradlee Van Pelt (born 1980), American football quarterback and safety, son of Brad
- Bo Van Pelt (born 1975), American golfer
- Calvin Leroy Van Pelt (1924–2011), Native American businessman
- Daniel Van Pelt (born 1964), American politician convicted of bribery
- Darin Van Pelt (born 1979), American aerospace engineer
- Erika Van Pelt (born 1985), American singer
- Frank P. Van Pelt (1861–1942), Sandy Hook pilot
- Graham Van Pelt, Canadian musician and songwriter
- James Van Pelt (born 1954), American science fiction author
- Jim Van Pelt (1935–2022), American football quarterback
- John Van Pelt "JVP" (1958–2023), American news correspondent & educator
- John Vredenburgh Van Pelt (1874–1962), American architect
- Patricia Van Pelt (born 1957), American (Illinois) politician
- Robert Van Pelt (1897–1988), American (Nebraska) judge
- Robert Jan van Pelt (born 1955), Dutch historian and Holocaust scholar.
- Scott Van Pelt (born 1966), American sportscaster
- Sydney James Van Pelt (1908–1976), Australian medical doctor and hypnotist
- William Van Pelt (1905–1996), American politician, representative from Wisconsin
- Wouter van Pelt (born 1968), Dutch field hockey player

Fictional characters

- Three siblings from the Peanuts comic strip: Linus, Lucy, and Rerun Van Pelt
- Van Pelt, a fictional character and antagonist from the 1995 American fantasy adventure film, Jumanji and the Jumanji Television series
- Grace Van Pelt, in TV series The Mentalist
- Maddie Van Pelt, from the Nickelodeon series Every Witch Way
- Russell Van Pelt, the primary antagonist character in the 2017 American fantasy comedy film, Jumanji: Welcome to the Jungle

== Other uses ==
- The Van Pelt, an indie rock band
- Van Pelt Library, the University of Pennsylvania's main library, named after Charles Patterson Van Pelt, the major donor at the time of construction.
- Van Pelt Manor in Brooklyn, New York, named after the Dutch settler Teunis Laenen van Pelt
- Mount Van Pelt, mountain in Antarctica
