= Black Twig Pickers =

The Black Twig Pickers
- Origin: Blacksburg, Virginia, Shawsville, Virginia, Lewisburg, West Virginia, United States
- Genres: Old-time music
- Labels: Thrill Jockey, VHF Records, Beautiful Happiness, House Of Mercy Recordings
- Members: Mike Gangloff; Nathan Bowles; Isak Howell; Sally Anne Morgan

The Black Twig Pickers is an Appalachian old-time band consisting of Mike Gangloff on fiddle/banjo/jawharp/vocals; Nathan Bowles on banjo/percussion/vocals; Isak Howell on guitar/mouthharp/vocals; and Sally Anne Morgan on fiddle, flat-foot dancing, square dance calling, and vocals. They come from Shawsville and Blacksburg in Montgomery County, Virginia and Lewisburg in Greenbrier County, West Virginia.

The Black Twig Pickers have recorded on labels including Thrill Jockey, VHF Records, Beautiful Happiness, Klang and Great Pop Supplement.

== Selected discography ==
- Friend's Peace (LP, MP3 VHF Records, 2021)
- Seasonal Hire (with Steve Gunn), Thrill Jockey, 2015
- Rough Carpenters, Thrill Jockey, 2013
- Whompyjawed, Thrill Jockey, 2012
- Yellow Cat, (7", Thrill Jockey, 2012) Thrill Jockey, 2012
- Ironto Special, (CD, LP and MP3, Thrill Jockey, 2010)
- Where You Gonna Be (When The Good Lord Calls You Home)? (7", The Great Pop Supplement, 2010)
- Glory in the Meeting House (with Charlie Parr) (LP, CD, House Of Mercy Recordings, 2010)
- Hobo Handshake (CD, MP3, VHF Records, 2008)
- Midnight Has Come And Gone (CD, MP3, VHF Records, 2005)
- Soon One Morning (CD, MP3, VHF Records, 2003)
- Big Banjo Blues (MP3, Klang 2002)
- North Fork Flyer (CD, MP3, VHF Records, 2001)

== Press and reviews ==
The band's 2013 album Rough Carpenters received a favorable review of 7.4 out 10 by Pitchfork Media, with critic Grayson Currin calling it "vibrant and enveloping."
