= Jack Rose (guitarist) =

American guitarist

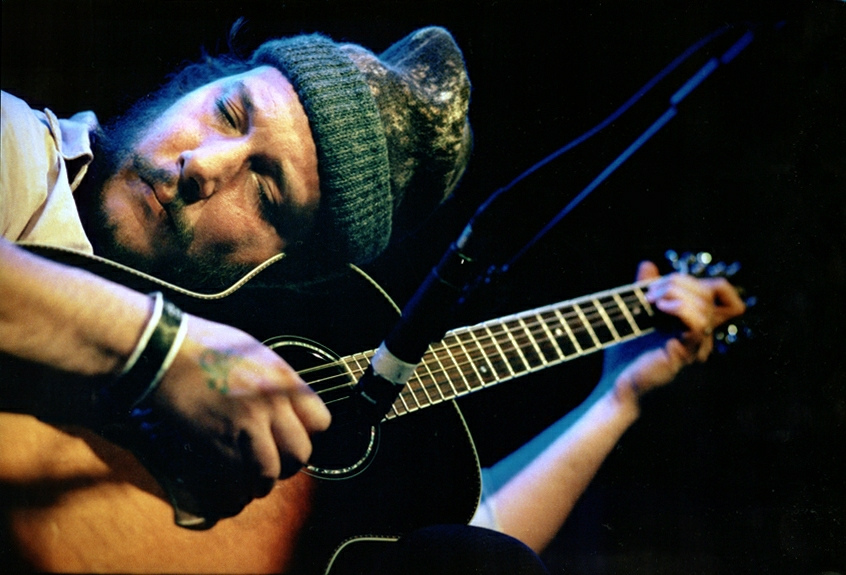
- Rose at The Luminaire in London, 2007

Background information
- Also known as: Dr. Ragtime
- Born: February 16, 1971; Fredericksburg, Virginia
- Died: December 5, 2009 (aged 38) Philadelphia, Pennsylvania
- Genres: American primitive guitar, ragtime, blues, folk, country blues, drone, noise, raga, experimental
- Occupation: Musician
- Instruments: Guitar, Twelve-string guitar, Lap steel guitar, Vocals
- Years active: 1993–2009
- Labels: Eclipse, VHF, Tequila Sunrise, Sacred Harp Library, Beautiful Happiness, Three Lobed Recordings, Klang Industries, Time-Lag, Locust, Bastet, Thrill Jockey, Life is Hard
- Formerly of: Pelt

Jack Rose (February 16, 1971 – December 5, 2009) was an American guitarist originally from Virginia and later based in Philadelphia. Rose is best known for his solo acoustic guitar work. He was also a member of the noise/drone band Pelt.

== Career ==
=== Pelt and beyond ===
In 1993, Jack Rose joined the noise/drone band Pelt with Michael Gangloff and Patrick Best. Then influenced by punk and rock and roll initially, the trio, sometimes joined by friends including Mikel Dimmick and Jason Bill (also of Charalambides), released their first album in 1995. Rose continued from that point as both a solo act as well as a member of Pelt, who continued to put out more than a dozen albums and a handful of minor releases primarily on the VHF Records and Eclipse labels as well as the band's own Klang imprint. The group toured steadily in the U.S. and referenced the work ethic of the Grateful Dead in the title of their album Rob's Choice. Notable tourmates included Harry Pussy, Charalambides and Sonic Youth. In Pelt, Rose played a variety of instruments, primarily electric guitar. During the late 1990s, Pelt began to play more folk-derived material, with Rose switching to acoustic guitar. Byron Coley wrote a feature on the group for the magazine The Wire, calling them "the Hillbilly Theatre of Eternal Music." In late 1999, after Rose had been fired from his job at a coffee shop and was able to collect unemployment benefits, he concentrated on acoustic guitar and his technique developed rapidly. He first released two CD-Rs, Hung Far Low, Portland, Oregon and Doctor Ragtime, which featured a mix of country blues and ragtime. These releases were composed of original and traditional songs, including covers of songs by fingerpicking guitarists John Fahey and Sam McGee. His first proper full-length, Red Horse, White Mule, (named after brands of moonshine mentioned on a best-selling sermon of the late 20s, "The Black Diamond Express Train to Hell" by Reverend A. W. Nix) was released on vinyl by Eclipse Records in 2002.

=== Solo work ===
Jack Rose was a relatively successful recording artist in his short solo career, with albums, EPs, and compilation tracks on no fewer than ten record labels. He gained a new level of public exposure upon his inclusion on Devendra Banhart's sold-out Golden Apples of the Sun compilation in 2004.

Rose's first three consecutive releases on Eclipse Records—Red Horse, White Mule (2002), Opium Musick (2003), and Raag Manifestos (2004)—were met with praise by critics and contemporaries alike. "Finally," said Ben Chasny of Six Organs of Admittance, referring to Opium Musick in an interview with Pitchfork, "somebody has something to say on the acoustic guitar that hasn't been said before."

Raag Manifestos was named one of 2004's "50 Records of the Year" by the UK avant garde music magazine The Wire in January 2005, following a feature on him in issue #241. Rose's rise in popularity in the UK during that time coincided with his Peel Session on May 20, 2004.

In 2005 he released Kensington Blues on Tequila Sunrise records. Featuring ragtime, ragas, country blues and lap steel, the record earned high marks from Pitchfork and Dusted Magazine. "Kensington Blues is a really hard record to live up to," Rose told Foxy Digitalis in a 2007 interview. He went on to express doubts about some of his other material released around that period of time. "With everyone putting out so much stuff, I mean you've gotta have new product all the time, it's kind of a drag," he continued. "I hate to sound like a total capitalist here... but when you're on tour you need to have something to sustain you."

His recorded collaborators outside of Pelt were infrequent but include Jason Bill of Charalambides, Donald Miller of Borbetomagus, Glenn Jones of Cul de Sac, Ian Nagoski and Keenan Lawler. In 2008, he reunited with Pelt members and other musicians including Micah Blue Smaldone on his album Dr. Ragtime and His Pals.

He released two live LPs on Three Lobed Recordings, I Do Play Rock And Roll (2008) and The Black Dirt Sessions (2009), receiving positive reviews from Brainwashed and Pitchfork. The Wooden Guitar compilation on Locust Music was issued on vinyl for the first time in 2009 and almost immediately went out of print.

With the exception of his first two CD-R releases, all of his music has been available on vinyl, often in limited editions. His Dr. Ragtime 78, for example, was produced in an edition of only 6 copies, with one selling for $500 as part of a benefit auction on eBay. Some of his more popular releases such as Kensington Blues have been re-pressed on vinyl in open editions.

Jack Rose and The Black Twig Pickers, his ninth LP, was released in May 2009. An appearance on the 7-inch compilation Meet the Philly Elite and a tour-only 7-inch on the Great Pop Supplement followed.

== Style ==
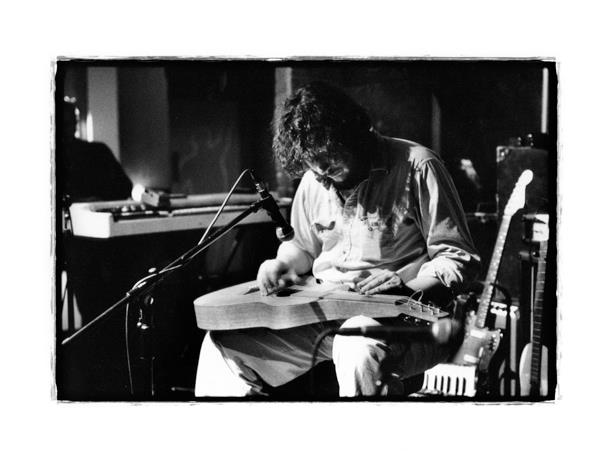
In 2006, Rose playing lap steel guitar at the Buffalo Bar in London

Rose's compositions were mostly for 6-string guitar, 12-string guitar, and Weissenborn-style lap steel guitar. He often employed open tunings when playing.

He was compared to guitarists on the Takoma label from the 1960s, including American primitive guitarist John Fahey, Robbie Basho and former Vanguard recording artist and eventual touring partner Peter Walker.

Rose cited Charley Patton, Blind Blake, John Fahey, Robbie Basho, Zia Mohiuddin Dagar and, in later years, Link Wray as influences.

== Death and legacy ==
Rose died of an apparent heart attack in Philadelphia, at the age of 38. He was buried at West Laurel Hill Cemetery in Bala Cynwyd, Pennsylvania.

Luck In The Valley, Rose's final LP, was released posthumously on February 23, 2010, by Thrill Jockey Records. The record was the third installment of what Jack self-deprecatingly referred to as his "Ditch Trilogy." The album received an 8.2 on Pitchfork and featured Glenn Jones, Harmonica Dan, and pianist Hans Chew on most of the session.

In late April 2010, Three Lobed Recordings curated and released the digital compilation Honest Strings: A Tribute To The Life And Work Of Jack Rose, with all proceeds going to Rose's estate.

Rose's final recording, an electrified 4 song collaboration with D. Charles Speer & The Helix called Ragged and Right was released on June 15, 2010, as part of Thrill Jockey's singles club. The EP was recorded at Black Dirt Studios with Jason Meagher.

== Discography ==
=== Dr. Ragtime ===
- Doctor Ragtime CD-R (2002) (Tequila Sunrise), ed. 50
- Dr. Ragtime – "Buckdancer's Choice" b/w "Dark Was the Night, Cold Was the Ground" 7-inch EP (2005) (Sacred Harp Library), ed. 500
- Dr. Ragtime "Alap" b/w "Flirtin' with The Undertaker" 78 rpm EP (2005) (Life is Hard), ed. 6
- Dr. Ragtime and His Pals LP (2008) (Tequila Sunrise), an edition of 100 for the Terrastock Festival, containing 4 extra songs from the final LP release, and an alternate cover silk-screened by Brooke Sietinsons of Espers
- Dr. Ragtime and His Pals CD/LP (2008) (Beautiful Happiness/Tequila Sunrise), LP ed. of 1000

=== Jack Rose ===
- Portland, OR CD-R (2001) (self-released/Klang Industries)
- Red Horse, White Mule LP (2002) (Eclipse Records), ed. 500
- Opium Musick LP (2003) (Eclipse Records), ed. 1000
- Raag Manifestos LP (2004) (Eclipse Records), ed. 1000
- Kensington Blues CD/LP (2005) (VHF Records/Tequila Sunrise), ed. 500. Open edition on VHF.
- Untitled I & II 7-inch EP (2006) (Tequila Sunrise), ed. 500
- Jack Rose CD/LP (2006) (aRCHIVE/Tequila Sunrise), ed. 1000
- Split with Silvester Anfang 7-inch EP (2007) (Funeral Folk)
- I Do Play Rock and Roll CD/LP (2008) (Three Lobed Recordings), LP ed. 938
- Jack Rose and The Black Twigs 7-inch EP (2008) (The Great Pop Supplement), ed. 500
- The Black Dirt Sessions LP (2009) (Three Lobed Recordings), LP ed. 2021
- Jack Rose and The Black Twig Pickers LP (2009) (Klang Industries), ed. 1000
- Jack Rose and The Black Twigs 7-inch EP (2009) (The Great Pop Supplement) ed. 400
- Luck In the Valley CD/LP (2010) (Thrill Jockey) LP ed. 1500
- Ragged and Right With D. Charles Speer & The Helix 12-inch EP (2010) ed. 500
- 12.11.2009 CD-R (2010) (Unsound Recordings) ed. 230

=== Compilations ===
- Klang VII CD-R (1999) (Klang Industries)
- Wooden Guitar CD/LP (2003; 2008) (Locust Music)
- Golden Apples of the Sun CD (2004) (Bastet)
- Imaginational Anthem CD (2005) (Near Mint Records)
- By the Fruits you Shall Know the Roots 3×LP (2005) (Eclipse/Time-Lag)
- Less Self is More Self: Tarantula Hill Benefit 2CD (2006) (Ecstatic Peace!)
- Meet the Philly Elite (with Meg Baird, Kurt Vile, and US Girls) 7-inch (Kraak)
